= 2020 Sparkassen ATP Challenger – Doubles =

Doubles
- 2020 Sparkassen ATP Challenger

Final
- Champions: (Germany) Andre Begemann (France) Albano Olivetti
- Runners-up: (Croatia) Ivan Sabanov (Croatia) Matej Sabanov
- Score: 6–3, 6–2

Events
Singles	Doubles
← 2019 ·	Sparkassen ATP Challenger	· 2021 →

Nikola Ćaćić and Antonio Šančić were the defending champions but chose not to defend their title.

Andre Begemann and Albano Olivetti won the title after defeating Ivan and Matej Sabanov 6–3, 6–2 in the final.

== Seeds ==
1. (Germany) Andre Begemann / (France) Albano Olivetti (champions)
2. (United Kingdom) Lloyd Glasspool / (United States) Alex Lawson (quarterfinals)
3. (Poland) Karol Drzewiecki / (Poland) Szymon Walków (quarterfinals)
4. (United States) James Cerretani / (Switzerland) Luca Margaroli (quarterfinals)

== Draw ==
=== Key ===
- Q = Qualifier
- WC = Wild card
- LL = Lucky loser
- Alt = Alternate
- SE = Special exempt
- PR = Protected ranking
- ITF = ITF entry
- JE = Junior exempt
- w/o = Walkover
- r = Retired
- d = Defaulted
- SR = Special ranking

First round
1	(Germany) A Begemann (France) A Olivetti	6	6
WC	(Germany) Elmar Ejupovic (Italy) Horst Rieder	3	4
Alt	(Belgium) M Geerts (Germany) J Lenz	4	7^{7}	[10]
(Russia) P Kotov (Russia) A Vatutin	6	6^{2}	[3]
3	(Poland) K Drzewiecki (Poland) S Walków	7^{7}	4	[10]
(Germany) D Masur (Austria) S Ofner	6^{4}	6	[8]
WC	(Italy) F Maestrelli (Italy) L Nardi	1	4
(Italy) F Forti (Italy) F Gaio	6	6
(Turkey) A Çelikbilek (France) H Grenier	2	6^{1}
(Croatia) I Sabanov (Croatia) M Sabanov	6	7^{7}
WC	(Italy) Patric Prinoth (Italy) Erwin Tröbinger	6^{4}	5
4	(United States) J Cerretani (Switzerland) L Margaroli	7^{7}	7
(Czech Republic) Z Kolář (Czech Republic) M Vrbenský	3	6^{4}
(United States) M Cressy (France) A Rinderknech	6	7^{7}
(Finland) H Heliövaara (Finland) P Niklas-Salminen	7	6^{6}	[8]
2	(United Kingdom) L Glasspool (United States) A Lawson	5	7^{8}	[10]

Quarterfinals
1	(Germany) A Begemann (France) A Olivetti	6	6
Alt	(Belgium) M Geerts (Germany) J Lenz	3	3
3	(Poland) K Drzewiecki (Poland) S Walków	7^{7}	4	[6]
(Italy) F Forti (Italy) F Gaio	6^{5}	6	[10]
(Croatia) I Sabanov (Croatia) M Sabanov	4	6	[10]
4	(United States) J Cerretani (Switzerland) L Margaroli	6	3	[6]
(United States) M Cressy (France) A Rinderknech	6	7^{7}
2	(United Kingdom) L Glasspool (United States) A Lawson	4	6^{1}

Semifinals
1	(Germany) A Begemann (France) A Olivetti	7^{7}	6
(Italy) F Forti (Italy) F Gaio	6^{3}	1
(Croatia) I Sabanov (Croatia) M Sabanov	3	7^{7}	[10]
(United States) M Cressy (France) A Rinderknech	6	6^{3}	[5]

Final
1	(Germany) A Begemann (France) A Olivetti	6	6
(Croatia) I Sabanov (Croatia) M Sabanov	3	2
