= 2021 Sparkassen ATP Challenger =

- Date: 8–14 November
- Edition: 12th
- Surface: Hard (Indoor)
- Location: Ortisei, Italy

Champions

Singles
- (Germany) Oscar Otte

Doubles
- (Croatia) Antonio Šančić / (Austria) Tristan-Samuel Weissborn
← 2020 ·	Sparkassen ATP Challenger	· 2022 →

The 2021 Sparkassen ATP Challenger was a professional tennis tournament played on indoor hard courts in Ortisei, Italy between 8 and 14 November 2021. It was the twelfth edition of the tournament and was part of the 2021 ATP Challenger Tour.

== Singles main-draw entrants ==
=== Seeds ===
Country	Player	Rank^{1}	Seed
GER	Oscar Otte	126	1
USA	Maxime Cressy	133	2
FRA	Quentin Halys	146	3
ECU	Emilio Gómez	149	4
ITA	Federico Gaio	151	5
ESP	Fernando Verdasco	165	6
SUI	Marc-Andrea Hüsler	186	7
ITA	Alessandro Giannessi	192	8

- ^{1} Rankings are as of 1 November 2021.

=== Other entrants ===
The following players received wildcards into the singles main draw:

- (Italy) Matteo Arnaldi
- (Italy) Luca Nardi
- (Italy) Alexander Weis

The following players received entry from the qualifying draw:

- (Moldova) Alexander Cozbinov
- (Bosnia and Herzegovina) Nerman Fatić
- (Austria) Lucas Miedler
- (Germany) Tobias Simon

== Champions ==
=== Singles ===
- (Germany) Oscar Otte def. (United States) Maxime Cressy 7–6^{(7–5)}, 6–4.

=== Doubles ===
- (Croatia) Antonio Šančić / (Austria) Tristan-Samuel Weissborn def. (Austria) Alexander Erler / (Austria) Lucas Miedler 7–6^{(10–8)}, 4–6, [10–8].
