= 2015 Sparkassen ATP Challenger – Singles =

Singles
- 2015 Sparkassen ATP Challenger

Final
- Champion: (Lithuania) Ričardas Berankis
- Runner-up: (United States) Rajeev Ram
- Score: 7–6^{(7–3)}, 6–4

Events
| Singles | Doubles |
| ← 2014 · | Sparkassen ATP Challenger | · 2016 → |

Ričardas Berankis won the title, defeating Rajeev Ram in the final 7–6^{(7–3)}, 6–4 .

== Seeds ==
1. (Lithuania) Ričardas Berankis (champion)
2. (Russia) Evgeny Donskoy (semifinals)
3. (United States) Rajeev Ram (final)
4. (Germany) Dustin Brown (first round)
5. (Germany) Michael Berrer (second round)
6. (Italy) Luca Vanni (quarterfinals)
7. (Bosnia and Herzegovina) Mirza Bašić (quarterfinals)
8. (Italy) Andrea Arnaboldi (second round)

== Draw ==
=== Key ===
- Q = Qualifier
- WC = Wild card
- LL = Lucky loser
- Alt = Alternate
- SE = Special exempt
- PR = Protected ranking
- ITF = ITF entry
- JE = Junior exempt
- w/o = Walkover
- r = Retired
- d = Defaulted
- SR = Special ranking

=== Finals ===
Semifinals
1 | (Lithuania) Ričardas Berankis | 6 | 6
(Serbia) Laslo Đere | 3 | 2
3 | (United States) Rajeev Ram | 6 | 6
2 | (Russia) Evgeny Donskoy | 4 | 3

Final
1 | (Lithuania) Ričardas Berankis | 7^{7} | 6
3 | (United States) Rajeev Ram | 6^{3} | 4

=== Top half ===
First round
1 | (Lithuania) R Berankis | 7^{7} | 6^{4} | 6
(Germany) M Marterer | 6^{4} | 7^{7} | 3
(India) R Ramanathan | 7^{8} | 7
Q | (Croatia) V Galović | 6^{6} | 5
(Italy) S Caruso | 6 | 6
(Ukraine) D Molchanov | 4 | 2
(France) Y Jankovits | 4 | 6 | 5
7 | (Bosnia and Herzegovina) M Bašić | 6 | 2 | 7
4 | (Germany) D Brown | 3 | 7^{7} | 3
(Bosnia and Herzegovina) A Šetkić | 6 | 6^{3} | 6
(Lithuania) L Grigelis | 4 | 7^{7} | 6^{0}
(Italy) A Giannessi | 6 | 6^{3} | 7^{7}
(Serbia) L Đere | 6 | 6
WC | (Italy) M Berrettini | 4 | 3
Q | (Germany) K Krawietz | 6^{4} | 6^{7}
5 | (Germany) M Berrer | 7^{7} | 7^{9}

Second round
1 | (Lithuania) R Berankis | 7 | 6
(India) R Ramanathan | 5 | 2
(Italy) S Caruso | 1 | 2
7 | (Bosnia and Herzegovina) M Bašić | 6 | 6
(Bosnia and Herzegovina) A Šetkić | 6 | 6
(Italy) A Giannessi | 3 | 1
(Serbia) L Đere | 7 | 2 | 6
5 | (Germany) M Berrer | 5 | 6 | 0

Quarterfinals
1 | (Lithuania) R Berankis | 6 | 6
7 | (Bosnia and Herzegovina) M Bašić | 3 | 4
(Bosnia and Herzegovina) A Šetkić | 6^{8} | 7^{7} | 6^{2}
(Serbia) L Đere | 7^{10} | 6^{4} | 7^{7}

Semifinals
1 | (Lithuania) R Berankis | 6 | 6
(Serbia) L Đere | 3 | 2

=== Bottom half ===
First round
6 | (Italy) L Vanni | 7^{7} | 6
(Czech Republic) J Hernych | 6^{3} | 3
(Italy) R Marcora | 7^{7} | 4 | 5
(Italy) Erik Crepaldi | 6^{4} | 6 | 7
WC | (Italy) L Sonego | 6 | 6
WC | (Italy) Edoardo Eremin | 4 | 1
Q | (Croatia) N Mektić | 4 | 4
3 | (United States) R Ram | 6 | 6
8 | (Italy) A Arnaboldi | 6 | 6
(Italy) L Giustino | 1 | 2
(Hungary) M Fucsovics | 6 | 4 | 7^{8}
(Belgium) N Desein | 3 | 6 | 6^{6}
WC | (Russia) D Tursunov | 5 | 7 | 2
Q | (Austria) M Neuchrist | 7 | 5 | 6
(Italy) F Gaio | 2 | 6 | 3
2 | (Russia) E Donskoy | 6 | 3 | 6

Second round
6 | (Italy) L Vanni | 7^{7} | 6
(Italy) E Crepaldi | 6^{4} | 3
WC | (Italy) L Sonego | 7^{7} | 6^{8} | 4
3 | (United States) R Ram | 6^{2} | 7^{10} | 6
8 | (Italy) A Arnaboldi | 4 | 4
(Hungary) M Fucsovics | 6 | 6
Q | (Austria) M Neuchrist | 4 | 6^{5}
2 | (Russia) E Donskoy | 6 | 7^{7}

Quarterfinals
6 | (Italy) L Vanni | 5 | 3
3 | (United States) R Ram | 7 | 6
(Hungary) M Fucsovics | 4 | 6 | 1^{r}
2 | (Russia) E Donskoy | 6 | 3 | 5

Semifinals
3 | (United States) R Ram | 6 | 6
2 | (Russia) E Donskoy | 4 | 3
