= 2021 Sparkassen ATP Challenger – Singles =

Singles
- 2021 Sparkassen ATP Challenger

Final
- Champion: (Germany) Oscar Otte
- Runner-up: (United States) Maxime Cressy
- Score: 7–6^{(7–5)}, 6–4

Events
Singles	Doubles
← 2020 ·	Sparkassen ATP Challenger	· 2022 →

Ilya Ivashka was the defending champion but chose not to defend his title.

Oscar Otte won the title after defeating Maxime Cressy 7–6^{(7–5)}, 6–4 in the final.

== Seeds ==
1. (Germany) Oscar Otte (champion)
2. (United States) Maxime Cressy (final)
3. (France) Quentin Halys (second round)
4. (Ecuador) Emilio Gómez (first round)
5. (Italy) Federico Gaio (quarterfinals)
6. (Spain) Fernando Verdasco (first round)
7. (Switzerland) Marc-Andrea Hüsler (second round)
8. (Italy) Alessandro Giannessi (first round)

== Draw ==
=== Key ===
- Q = Qualifier
- WC = Wild card
- LL = Lucky loser
- Alt = Alternate
- SE = Special exempt
- PR = Protected ranking
- ITF = ITF entry
- JE = Junior exempt
- w/o = Walkover
- r = Retired
- d = Defaulted
- SR = Special ranking

=== Finals ===
Semifinals
1	(Germany) Oscar Otte	7^{7}	6
(United Kingdom) Jack Draper	6^{3}	4
(Bosnia and Herzegovina) Mirza Bašić	5	2
2	(United States) Maxime Cressy	7	6

Final
1	(Germany) Oscar Otte	7^{7}	6
2	(United States) Maxime Cressy	6^{5}	4

=== Top half ===
First round
1	(Germany) O Otte	7^{7}	7^{7}
(Italy) R Marcora	6^{1}	6^{4}
(Germany) M Bachinger	6	6^{9}	7^{8}
Q	(Germany) Tobias Simon	3	7^{11}	6^{6}
(United Kingdom) R Peniston	6	6
Q	(Moldova) A Cozbinov	3	2
(Italy) GM Moroni	4	6^{1}
7	(Switzerland) M-A Hüsler	6	7^{7}
4	(Ecuador) E Gómez	4	2
(United Kingdom) J Draper	6	6
WC	(Italy) M Arnaldi	6^{9}	0
Q	(Austria) L Miedler	7^{11}	6
(Switzerland) D Stricker	6	3	7
(Italy) M Viola	4	6	5
(Germany) N Kuhn	3	6^{5}
5	(Italy) F Gaio	6	7^{7}

Second round
1	(Germany) O Otte	6	6
(Germany) M Bachinger	3	1
(United Kingdom) R Peniston	7^{7}	6
7	(Switzerland) M-A Hüsler	6^{1}	4
(United Kingdom) J Draper	6	7^{7}
Q	(Austria) L Miedler	4	6^{1}
(Switzerland) D Stricker	6^{5}	6^{2}
5	(Italy) F Gaio	7^{7}	7^{7}

Quarterfinals
1	(Germany) O Otte	6	6
(United Kingdom) R Peniston	2	4
(United Kingdom) J Draper	6^{6}	7^{7}	6
5	(Italy) F Gaio	7^{8}	6^{5}	2

Semifinals
1	(Germany) O Otte	7^{7}	6
(United Kingdom) J Draper	6^{3}	4

=== Bottom half ===
First round
6	(Spain) F Verdasco	6^{6}	6	3
(Ukraine) V Sachko	7^{8}	4	6
(Croatia) B Gojo	6	7^{7}
(Germany) D Masur	4	6^{4}
(Bosnia and Herzegovina) M Bašić	6	6
(Russia) E Karlovskiy	4	3
WC	(Italy) L Nardi	4	3
3	(France) Q Halys	6	6
8	(Italy) A Giannessi	7^{8}	3	5
Q	(Bosnia and Herzegovina) N Fatić	6^{6}	6	7
(Romania) M Copil	6	7^{7}
WC	(Italy) Alexander Weis	4	6^{5}
(Chinese Taipei) C-h Tseng	6	3	4
(Ecuador) R Quiroz	4	6	6
(Netherlands) T van Rijthoven	6^{6}	5
2	(United States) M Cressy	7^{8}	7

Second round
(Ukraine) V Sachko	6	6
(Croatia) B Gojo	2	4
(Bosnia and Herzegovina) M Bašić	7^{14}	6
3	(France) Q Halys	6^{12}	3
Q	(Bosnia and Herzegovina) N Fatić	6^{1}	2
(Romania) M Copil	7^{7}	6
(Ecuador) R Quiroz	6^{3}	4
2	(United States) M Cressy	7^{7}	6

Quarterfinals
(Ukraine) V Sachko	6^{3}	6	2
(Bosnia and Herzegovina) M Bašić	7^{7}	3	6
(Romania) M Copil	6^{8}	4
2	(United States) M Cressy	7^{10}	6

Semifinals
(Bosnia and Herzegovina) M Bašić	5	2
2	(United States) M Cressy	7	6
