= 2016 Sparkassen ATP Challenger – Doubles =

Doubles
- 2016 Sparkassen ATP Challenger

Final
- Champions: (Germany) Kevin Krawietz (France) Albano Olivetti
- Runners-up: (Canada) Frank Dancevic (Serbia) Marko Tepavac
- Score: 6–4, 6–4

Events
Singles	Doubles
← 2015 ·	Sparkassen ATP Challenger	· 2017 →

Maximilian Neuchrist and Tristan-Samuel Weissborn were the defending champions but chose not to defend their title.

Kevin Krawietz and Albano Olivetti won the title after defeating Frank Dancevic and Marko Tepavac 6–4, 6–4 in the final.

== Seeds ==
1. (Czech Republic) Roman Jebavý / (Croatia) Antonio Šančić (semifinals)
2. (Netherlands) Sander Arends / (Poland) Mateusz Kowalczyk (first round)
3. (Italy) Riccardo Ghedin / (Croatia) Dino Marcan (semifinals)
4. (Germany) Kevin Krawietz / (France) Albano Olivetti (champions)

== Draw ==
=== Key ===
- Q = Qualifier
- WC = Wild card
- LL = Lucky loser
- Alt = Alternate
- SE = Special exempt
- PR = Protected ranking
- ITF = ITF entry
- JE = Junior exempt
- w/o = Walkover
- r = Retired
- d = Defaulted
- SR = Special ranking

First round
1	(Czech Republic) R Jebavý (Croatia) A Šančić	7^{10}	6^{5}	[10]
(Croatia) M Draganja (Croatia) T Draganja	6^{8}	7^{7}	[8]
WC	(Italy) G Mager (Italy) A Vavassori	3	3
(Italy) S Caruso (Italy) A Giannessi	6	6
4	(Germany) K Krawietz (France) A Olivetti	6	6
(Italy) F Gaio (Italy) S Napolitano	3	4
(Czech Republic) Z Kolář (Croatia) N Serdarušić	4	4
WC	(Italy) M Berrettini (Italy) L Sonego	6	6
(Spain) A Menéndez-Maceiras (Italy) L Vanni	7^{12}	3	[14]
(Italy) A Motti (India) R Ramanathan	6^{10}	6	[16]
(Turkey) T Altuna (Russia) A Bublik	6	4	[9]
3	(Italy) R Ghedin (Croatia) D Marcan	2	6	[11]
(Netherlands) D Pel (Serbia) Ilija Vučić	6	7
WC	(Italy) Patrick Prader (Italy) Patric Prinoth	1	5
(Canada) F Dancevic (Serbia) M Tepavac	7^{7}	7
2	(Netherlands) S Arends (Poland) M Kowalczyk	6^{3}	5

Quarterfinals
1	(Czech Republic) R Jebavý (Croatia) A Šančić	6	6
(Italy) S Caruso (Italy) A Giannessi	3	1
4	(Germany) K Krawietz (France) A Olivetti	7^{7}	6
WC	(Italy) M Berrettini (Italy) L Sonego	6^{2}	2
(Italy) A Motti (India) R Ramanathan	4	6^{7}
3	(Italy) R Ghedin (Croatia) D Marcan	6	7^{9}
(Netherlands) D Pel (Serbia) I Vučić	3	7	[5]
(Canada) F Dancevic (Serbia) M Tepavac	6	5	[10]

Semifinals
1	(Czech Republic) R Jebavý (Croatia) A Šančić	6	6^{7}	[10]
4	(Germany) K Krawietz (France) A Olivetti	4	7^{9}	[12]
3	(Italy) R Ghedin (Croatia) D Marcan	4	2
(Canada) F Dancevic (Serbia) M Tepavac	6	6

Final
4	(Germany) K Krawietz (France) A Olivetti	6	6
(Canada) F Dancevic (Serbia) M Tepavac	4	4
