= 2020 Sparkassen ATP Challenger – Singles =

Singles
- 2020 Sparkassen ATP Challenger

Final
- Champion: (Belarus) Ilya Ivashka
- Runner-up: (France) Antoine Hoang
- Score: 6–4, 3–6, 7–6^{(7–3)}

Events
Singles	Doubles
← 2019 ·	Sparkassen ATP Challenger	· 2021 →

Jannik Sinner was the defending champion but chose not to defend his title.

Ilya Ivashka won the title after defeating Antoine Hoang 6–4, 3–6, 7–6^{(7–3)} in the final.

== Seeds ==
1. (Japan) Yasutaka Uchiyama (first round)
2. (Belarus) Ilya Ivashka (champion)
3. (Russia) Aslan Karatsev (semifinals)
4. (Italy) Lorenzo Musetti (first round)
5. (France) Antoine Hoang (final)
6. (Italy) Federico Gaio (quarterfinals)
7. (Austria) Jurij Rodionov (first round)
8. (Slovakia) Martin Kližan (second round)

== Draw ==
=== Key ===
- Q = Qualifier
- WC = Wild card
- LL = Lucky loser
- Alt = Alternate
- SE = Special exempt
- PR = Protected ranking
- ITF = ITF entry
- JE = Junior exempt
- w/o = Walkover
- r = Retired
- d = Defaulted
- SR = Special ranking

=== Finals ===
Semifinals
(France) Alexandre Müller	6	2	2
5	(France) Antoine Hoang	3	6	6
3	(Russia) Aslan Karatsev	4	4
2	(Belarus) Ilya Ivashka	6	6

Final
5	(France) Antoine Hoang	4	6	6^{3}
2	(Belarus) Ilya Ivashka	6	3	7^{7}

=== Top half ===
First round
1	(Japan) Y Uchiyama	3	4
(France) A Müller	6	6
(United Kingdom) J Clarke	6	6^{9}	6
WC	(Italy) Patric Prinoth	3	7^{11}	3
(Austria) S Ofner	6^{4}	1
(Ukraine) I Marchenko	7^{7}	6
(France) H Grenier	5	6	6
7	(Austria) J Rodionov	7	4	3
4	(Italy) L Musetti	3	6^{5}
(Italy) R Marcora	6	7^{7}
SE	(Slovakia) L Klein	3	5
(Germany) J Lenz	6	7
Q	(Russia) P Kotov	7^{7}	4	6
(United States) M Cressy	6^{5}	6	4
(France) A Rinderknech	4	6	6^{5}
5	(France) A Hoang	6	3	7^{7}

Second round
(France) A Müller	7^{7}	6^{4}	6
(United Kingdom) J Clarke	6^{2}	7^{7}	3
(Ukraine) I Marchenko	w/o
(France) H Grenier
(Italy) R Marcora	3	6^{4}
(Germany) J Lenz	6	7^{7}
Q	(Russia) P Kotov	2	4
5	(France) A Hoang	6	6

Quarterfinals
(France) A Müller	6^{5}	7^{8}	7
(Ukraine) I Marchenko	7^{7}	6^{6}	5
(Germany) J Lenz	7^{8}	4	3
5	(France) A Hoang	6^{6}	6	6

Semifinals
(France) A Müller	6	2	2
5	(France) A Hoang	3	6	6

=== Bottom half ===
First round
6	(Italy) F Gaio	6	6
Q	(Italy) A Pellegrino	3	4
Q	(Turkey) A Çelikbilek	6	6
(Czech Republic) Z Kolář	4	2
LL	(Russia) A Vatutin	1	3
LL	(Russia) E Karlovskiy	6	6
(Germany) M Marterer	6^{4}	2
3	(Russia) A Karatsev	7^{7}	6
8	(Slovakia) M Kližan	6	6
WC	(Italy) G Zeppieri	1	3
WC	(Italy) L Nardi	6^{4}	6^{8}
(Czech Republic) T Macháč	7^{7}	7^{10}
(Germany) D Masur	3	7^{12}	3
Q	(Germany) J Härteis	6	6^{10}	6
(Italy) M Viola	1	1
2	(Belarus) I Ivashka	6	6

Second round
6	(Italy) F Gaio	6	7
Q	(Turkey) A Çelikbilek	4	5
LL	(Russia) E Karlovskiy	5	4
3	(Russia) A Karatsev	7	6
8	(Slovakia) M Kližan	4	2
(Czech Republic) T Macháč	6	6
Q	(Germany) J Härteis	6^{6}	3
2	(Belarus) I Ivashka	7^{8}	6

Quarterfinals
6	(Italy) F Gaio	6^{3}	3
3	(Russia) A Karatsev	7^{7}	6
(Czech Republic) T Macháč	6^{4}	6^{5}
2	(Belarus) I Ivashka	7^{7}	7^{7}

Semifinals
3	(Russia) A Karatsev	4	4
2	(Belarus) I Ivashka	6	6
