= 2014 Sparkassen ATP Challenger – Doubles =

Doubles
- 2014 Sparkassen ATP Challenger

Final
- Champions: (Belarus) Sergey Betov (Belarus) Aliaksandr Bury
- Runners-up: (Republic of Ireland) James Cluskey (United States) Austin Krajicek
- Score: 6–4, 5–7, [10–6]

Events
Singles	Doubles
← 2013 ·	Sparkassen ATP Challenger	· 2015 →

Christopher Kas and Tim Pütz were the defending champions, but chose not to participate together. Kas teamed up with Dustin Brown, but lost in the semi-finals to James Cluskey and Austin Krajicek. Pütz played alongside Dominik Meffert, but lost in the first round to Sergei Bubka and Sergiy Stakhovsky.

== Seeds ==
1. (Belarus) Sergey Betov / (Belarus) Aliaksandr Bury (champions)
2. (Germany) Dustin Brown / (Germany) Christopher Kas (semifinals)
3. (Republic of Ireland) James Cluskey / (United States) Austin Krajicek (final)
4. (Germany) Dominik Meffert / (Germany) Tim Pütz (first round)

== Draw ==
=== Key ===
- Q = Qualifier
- WC = Wild card
- LL = Lucky loser
- Alt = Alternate
- SE = Special exempt
- PR = Protected ranking
- ITF = ITF entry
- JE = Junior exempt
- w/o = Walkover
- r = Retired
- d = Defaulted
- SR = Special ranking

First round
1	(Belarus) S Betov (Belarus) A Bury	6	7
(Georgia (country)) N Basilashvili (Bosnia and Herzegovina) A Šetkić	2	5
WC	(Italy) Simon Berger (Italy) Jacob Nicolussi	4	2
(Italy) A Arnaboldi (Italy) M Viola	6	6
4	(Germany) D Meffert (Germany) T Pütz	6^{5}	6^{10}
(Ukraine) S Bubka (Ukraine) S Stakhovsky	7^{7}	7^{12}
WC	(Italy) David Kostner (Italy) Patric Prinoth	2	2
(Croatia) N Mektić (Croatia) D Marcan	6	6
(Italy) Francesco Borgo (Spain) E López-Pérez	7^{7}	6
(Bosnia and Herzegovina) M Bašić (Italy) Lorenzo Frigerio	6^{4}	3
WC	(Italy) F Gaio (Italy) Patrick Prader	6	1	[6]
3	(Republic of Ireland) J Cluskey (United States) A Krajicek	4	6	[10]
(Netherlands) W Koolhof (Serbia) G Tošić	6	6
(Italy) C Grassi (Italy) A Motti	2	2
(Germany) A Beck (Germany) P Petzschner	4	7^{7}	[8]
2	(Germany) D Brown (Germany) C Kas	6	6^{3}	[10]

Quarterfinals
1	(Belarus) S Betov (Belarus) A Bury	6	6
(Italy) A Arnaboldi (Italy) M Viola	4	2
(Ukraine) S Bubka (Ukraine) S Stakhovsky	4	6	[10]
(Croatia) N Mektić (Croatia) D Marcan	6	3	[8]
(Italy) F Borgo (Spain) E López-Pérez	6^{2}	4
3	(Republic of Ireland) J Cluskey (United States) A Krajicek	7^{7}	6
(Netherlands) W Koolhof (Serbia) G Tošić	2	3
2	(Germany) D Brown (Germany) C Kas	6	6

Semifinals
1	(Belarus) S Betov (Belarus) A Bury	6	3	[10]
(Ukraine) S Bubka (Ukraine) S Stakhovsky	4	6	[7]
3	(Republic of Ireland) J Cluskey (United States) A Krajicek	6	6
2	(Germany) D Brown (Germany) C Kas	2	4

Final
1	(Belarus) S Betov (Belarus) A Bury	6	5	[10]
3	(Republic of Ireland) J Cluskey (United States) A Krajicek	4	7	[6]
