= 2014 Sparkassen ATP Challenger – Singles =

Singles
- 2014 Sparkassen ATP Challenger

Final
- Champion: (Italy) Andreas Seppi
- Runner-up: (Germany) Matthias Bachinger
- Score: 6–4, 6–3

Events
Singles	Doubles
- Sparkassen ATP Challenger

Andreas Seppi was the defending champion. Seppi defended his title, defeating Matthias Bachinger in the final, 6–4, 6–3.

== Seeds ==
1. (Italy) Andreas Seppi (champion)
2. (Ukraine) Sergiy Stakhovsky (second round)
3. (Italy) Simone Bolelli (second round)
4. (Germany) Dustin Brown (semifinals)
5. (Germany) Andreas Beck (first round)
6. (Russia) Evgeny Donskoy (first round)
7. (Germany) Matthias Bachinger (final)
8. (United States) Austin Krajicek (quarterfinals)

== Draw ==
Key

- Q = Qualifier
- WC = Wild card
- LL = Lucky loser
- Alt = Alternate
- ITF = ITF entry
- PR = Protected ranking
- SR = Special ranking
- SE = Special exempt
- JE = Junior exempt
- JR = Junior Accelerator Programme entrant
- CO = College Accelerator Programme entrant
- NG = Next Gen Accelerator Program entrant
- w/o = Walkover
- r = Retired
- d = Defaulted

=== Finals ===
Semifinals
1/WC	(Italy) Andreas Seppi	6	7
Q	(Czech Republic) Jan Hernych	4	5
4	(Germany) Dustin Brown	2	2
7	(Germany) Matthias Bachinger	6	6

Final
1/WC	(Italy) Andreas Seppi	6	6
7	(Germany) Matthias Bachinger	4	3

=== Top half ===
First round
1/WC	(Italy) A Seppi	6	7
WC	(Italy) M Donati	3	5
(Republic of Ireland) L Sorensen	7^{7}	6
(Bosnia and Herzegovina) A Šetkić	6^{4}	4
PR	(Germany) P Petzschner	4	2
Q	(Germany) N Langer	6	6
(Spain) E López-Pérez	7^{7}	6
5	(Germany) A Beck	6^{4}	4
3	(Italy) S Bolelli	6	6
(Italy) M Viola	3	2
(Russia) A Karatsev	6	6
(Austria) M Fischer	3	2
WC	(Italy) F Gaio	3	6^{7}
(Germany) T Pütz	6	7^{9}
Q	(Czech Republic) J Hernych	7^{7}	6
6	(Russia) E Donskoy	6^{3}	2

Second round
1/WC	(Italy) A Seppi	6	6
(Republic of Ireland) L Sorensen	3	1
Q	(Germany) N Langer	6	7^{8}
(Spain) E López-Pérez	4	6^{6}
3	(Italy) S Bolelli	4	3
(Russia) A Karatsev	6	6
(Germany) T Pütz	6^{2}	6^{4}
Q	(Czech Republic) J Hernych	7^{7}	7^{7}

Quarterfinals
1/WC	(Italy) A Seppi	6	6
Q	(Germany) N Langer	1	3
(Russia) A Karatsev	6^{5}	6^{5}
Q	(Czech Republic) J Hernych	7^{7}	7^{7}

Semifinals
1/WC	(Italy) A Seppi	6	7
Q	(Czech Republic) J Hernych	4	5

=== Bottom half ===
First round
8	(United States) A Krajicek	6	6
(Italy) R Marcora	2	4
(Germany) D Brands	3	3
(Georgia (country)) N Basilashvili	6	6
PR	(Ukraine) S Bubka	3	3
Q	(Croatia) A Šančić	6	6
WC	(Italy) M Berrettini	3	4
4	(Germany) D Brown	6	6
7	(Germany) M Bachinger	6	6
(Belgium) K Coppejans	1	3
Q	(Italy) Alessandro Petrone	2	0
(Czech Republic) J Mertl	6	6
(Italy) A Arnaboldi	6	3	4
SE	(Bosnia and Herzegovina) M Bašić	3	6	6
(Croatia) N Mektić	4	5
2	(Ukraine) S Stakhovsky	6	7

Second round
8	(United States) A Krajicek	7^{7}	3	6
(Georgia (country)) N Basilashvili	6^{5}	6	3
Q	(Croatia) A Šančić	3	6^{4}
4	(Germany) D Brown	6	7^{7}
7	(Germany) M Bachinger	6	7^{7}
(Czech Republic) J Mertl	3	6^{4}
SE	(Bosnia and Herzegovina) M Bašić	3	7^{7}	6
2	(Ukraine) S Stakhovsky	6	6^{4}	4

Quarterfinals
8	(United States) A Krajicek	6^{3}	3
4	(Germany) D Brown	7^{7}	6
7	(Germany) M Bachinger	7	6
SE	(Bosnia and Herzegovina) M Bašić	5	1

Semifinals
4	(Germany) D Brown	2	2
7	(Germany) M Bachinger	6	6
