= 2018 Sparkassen ATP Challenger – Singles =

Singles
- 2018 Sparkassen ATP Challenger

Final
- Champion: (France) Ugo Humbert
- Runner-up: (France) Pierre-Hugues Herbert
- Score: 6–4, 6–2

Events
Singles	Doubles
← 2017 ·	Sparkassen ATP Challenger	· 2019 →

Lorenzo Sonego was the defending champion but lost in the first round to Constant Lestienne.

Ugo Humbert won the title after defeating Pierre-Hugues Herbert 6–4, 6–2 in the final.

== Seeds ==
1. (France) Pierre-Hugues Herbert (final)
2. (Slovakia) Lukáš Lacko (first round)
3. (Spain) Jaume Munar (first round)
4. (Italy) Lorenzo Sonego (first round)
5. (Lithuania) Ričardas Berankis (quarterfinals)
6. (France) Ugo Humbert (champion)
7. (Germany) Yannick Maden (withdrew)
8. (Germany) Matthias Bachinger (first round)

== Draw ==
=== Key ===
- Q = Qualifier
- WC = Wild card
- LL = Lucky loser
- Alt = Alternate
- SE = Special exempt
- PR = Protected ranking
- ITF = ITF entry
- JE = Junior exempt
- w/o = Walkover
- r = Retired
- d = Defaulted
- SR = Special ranking

=== Finals ===
Semifinals
1	(France) Pierre-Hugues Herbert	7^{7}	6
(Austria) Dennis Novak	6^{5}	4
6	(France) Ugo Humbert	6	6^{6}	6
(France) Grégoire Barrère	4	7^{8}	3

Final
1	(France) Pierre-Hugues Herbert	4	2
6	(France) Ugo Humbert	6	6

=== Top half ===
First round
1	(France) P-H Herbert	7	6
(Bosnia and Herzegovina) T Brkić	5	4
WC	(Italy) L Caruana	4	7^{10}	6
(France) S Robert	6	6^{8}	2
(Germany) D Masur	6	4	6^{4}
(Germany) O Otte	0	6	7^{7}
Q	(Germany) Tobias Simon	6^{5}	4
5	(Lithuania) R Berankis	7^{7}	6
3	(Spain) J Munar	3	6^{3}
Q	(Russia) Kirill Kivattsev	6	7^{7}
(Ukraine) S Stakhovsky	6^{4}	3
(Italy) S Bolelli	7^{7}	6
(Italy) S Caruso	2	4
(Germany) D Brown	6	6
(Austria) D Novak	1	6	7^{7}
8	(Germany) M Bachinger	6	3	6^{1}

Second round
1	(France) P-H Herbert	7^{8}	6
WC	(Italy) L Caruana	6^{6}	4
(Germany) O Otte	2	7	2
5	(Lithuania) R Berankis	6	5	6
Q	(Russia) K Kivattsev	3	2
(Italy) S Bolelli	6	6
(Germany) D Brown	2	7	4
(Austria) D Novak	6	5	6

Quarterfinals
1	(France) P-H Herbert	6	6
5	(Lithuania) R Berankis	3	2
(Italy) S Bolelli	6^{5}	6^{5}
(Austria) D Novak	7^{7}	7^{7}

Semifinals
1	(France) P-H Herbert	7^{7}	6
(Austria) D Novak	6^{5}	4

=== Bottom half ===
First round
6	(France) U Humbert	6	6
Q	(Germany) B Hassan	4	3
LL	(Italy) Fabrizio Ornago	6^{5}	4
(France) Q Halys	7^{7}	6
WC	(Italy) J Sinner	7^{7}	6
WC	(Italy) Luca Giacomini	6^{4}	1
(France) C Lestienne	6	4	6
4	(Italy) L Sonego	1	6	4
Q	(Germany) K Krawietz	7^{7}	4	7^{7}
(France) A Hoang	6^{4}	6	6^{5}
(Germany) M Moraing	6	6
WC	(Italy) R Brancaccio	2	2
(France) G Barrère	7	6^{6}	6
(Italy) S Napolitano	5	7^{8}	2
(Croatia) A Pavić	7^{9}	7^{18}
2	(Slovakia) L Lacko	6^{7}	6^{16}

Second round
6	(France) U Humbert	6^{4}	6	6
(France) Q Halys	7^{7}	3	4
WC	(Italy) J Sinner	7^{8}	5	5
(France) C Lestienne	6^{6}	7	7
Q	(Germany) K Krawietz	3	5
(Germany) M Moraing	6	7
(France) G Barrère	7^{7}	7^{7}
(Croatia) A Pavić	6^{1}	6^{3}

Quarterfinals
6	(France) U Humbert	7^{15}	6
(France) C Lestienne	6^{13}	3
(Germany) M Moraing	6	1	2
(France) G Barrère	4	6	6

Semifinals
6	(France) U Humbert	6	6^{6}	6
(France) G Barrère	4	7^{8}	3
