= 2014 Sparkassen ATP Challenger =

- Date: 3–9 November
- Edition: 5th
- Surface: Hard, Indoors
- Location: Ortisei, Italy

Champions

Singles
- (Italy) Andreas Seppi

Doubles
- (Belarus) Sergey Betov / (Belarus) Aliaksandr Bury
← 2013 ·	Sparkassen ATP Challenger	· 2015 →

The 2014 Sparkassen ATP Challenger was a professional tennis tournament played on indoor hard courts in Ortisei, Italy between 3 and 9 November 2014. It was the fifth edition of the tournament which was part of the 2014 ATP Challenger Tour.

== Singles main-draw entrants ==
=== Seeds ===
Country	Player	Rank^{1}	Seed
ITA	Andreas Seppi	51	1
UKR	Sergiy Stakhovsky	60	2
ITA	Simone Bolelli	72	3
GER	Dustin Brown	86	4
GER	Andreas Beck	113	5
RUS	Evgeny Donskoy	126	6
GER	Matthias Bachinger	157	7
USA	Austin Krajicek	166	8

- ^{1} Rankings are as of October 27, 2014.

=== Other entrants ===
The following players received wildcards into the singles main draw:

- (Italy) Matteo Berrettini
- (Italy) Matteo Donati
- (Italy) Federico Gaio
- (Italy) Andreas Seppi

The following players received special exempt into the singles main draw:

- (Bosnia and Herzegovina) Mirza Bašić

The following players received entry from the qualifying draw:

- (Czech Republic) Jan Hernych
- (Germany) Nils Langer
- (Italy) Alessandro Petrone
- (Croatia) Antonio Šančić

The following player received entry by a protected ranking:

- (Ukraine) Sergei Bubka
- (Germany) Philipp Petzschner

== Champions ==
=== Singles ===
- (Italy) Andreas Seppi def. (Germany) Matthias Bachinger 6–4, 6–3

=== Doubles ===
- (Belarus) Sergey Betov / (Belarus) Aliaksandr Bury def. (Republic of Ireland) James Cluskey / (United States) Austin Krajicek 6–4, 5–7, [10–6]
