= 2017 Sparkassen ATP Challenger =

- Date: 9–15 October
- Edition: 8th
- Surface: Hard, Indoors
- Location: Ortisei, Italy

Champions

Singles
- (Italy) Lorenzo Sonego

Doubles
- (Netherlands) Sander Arends / (Croatia) Antonio Šančić
← 2016 ·	Sparkassen ATP Challenger	· 2018 →

The 2017 Sparkassen ATP Challenger was a professional tennis tournament played on indoor hard courts in Ortisei, Italy between 9 and 15 October 2017. It was the eighth edition of the tournament which was part of the 2017 ATP Challenger Tour.

== Singles main-draw entrants ==
=== Seeds ===
Country	Player	Rank^{1}	Seed
~~ROU~~	~~Marius Copil~~	~~77~~	~~1~~
SVK	Norbert Gombos	80	2
ITA	Andreas Seppi	86	3
FRA	Pierre-Hugues Herbert	88	4
HUN	Márton Fucsovics	105	5
GER	Dustin Brown	121	6
GER	Oscar Otte	133	7
AUT	Sebastian Ofner	141	8

- ^{1} Rankings are as of 2 October 2017.

=== Other entrants ===
The following players received wildcards into the singles main draw:

- (Italy) Matteo Donati
- (Italy) Federico Gaio
- (Italy) Patrick Prader
- (Italy) Lorenzo Sonego

The following player received entry into the singles main draw using a protected ranking:

- (Netherlands) Igor Sijsling

The following players received entry from the qualifying draw:

- (Germany) Kevin Krawietz
- (Germany) Tim Pütz
- (Germany) Marc Sieber
- (Italy) Matteo Viola

The following players received entry as lucky losers:

- (Italy) Andrea Arnaboldi
- (Israel) Edan Leshem

== Champions ==
=== Singles ===
- (Italy) Lorenzo Sonego def. (Germany) Tim Pütz 6–4. 6–4.

=== Doubles ===
- (Netherlands) Sander Arends / (Croatia) Antonio Šančić def. (Germany) Jeremy Jahn / (Israel) Edan Leshem 6–2, 5–7, [13–11].
