= 2019 Sparkassen ATP Challenger – Singles =

Singles
- 2019 Sparkassen ATP Challenger

Final
- Champion: (Italy) Jannik Sinner
- Runner-up: (Austria) Sebastian Ofner
- Score: 6–2, 6–4

Events
Singles	Doubles
← 2018 ·	Sparkassen ATP Challenger	· 2020 →

Ugo Humbert was the defending champion but chose not to defend his title.

Jannik Sinner won the title after defeating Sebastian Ofner 6–2, 6–4 in the final.

== Seeds ==
All seeds receive a bye into the second round.

1. (Italy) Stefano Travaglia (second round)
2. (Italy) Jannik Sinner (champion)
3. (Italy) Salvatore Caruso (third round)
4. (Italy) Gianluca Mager (second round)
5. (Germany) Peter Gojowczyk (quarterfinals)
6. (France) Antoine Hoang (semifinals)
7. (Austria) Dennis Novak (third round)
8. (Italy) Federico Gaio (quarterfinals)
9. (Germany) Oscar Otte (second round)
10. (Austria) Sebastian Ofner (final)
11. (Serbia) Danilo Petrović (third round)
12. (United States) Maxime Cressy (third round)
13. (Italy) Roberto Marcora (third round)
14. (Spain) Bernabé Zapata Miralles (third round)
15. (France) Elliot Benchetrit (quarterfinals)
16. (Italy) Filippo Baldi (second round)

== Draw ==
=== Key ===
- Q = Qualifier
- WC = Wild card
- LL = Lucky loser
- Alt = Alternate
- SE = Special exempt
- PR = Protected ranking
- ITF = ITF entry
- JE = Junior exempt
- w/o = Walkover
- r = Retired
- d = Defaulted
- SR = Special ranking

=== Finals ===
Quarterfinals
(Italy) Luca Vanni	6	6
5	(Germany) Peter Gojowczyk	0	3
WC	(Italy) Lorenzo Musetti	6^{5}	2
10	(Austria) Sebastian Ofner	7^{7}	6
6	(France) Antoine Hoang	6	6
15	(France) Elliot Benchetrit	2	0
8	(Italy) Federico Gaio	4	4
2	(Italy) Jannik Sinner	6	6

Semifinals
(Italy) Luca Vanni	6^{4}	6^{3}
10	(Austria) Sebastian Ofner	7^{7}	7^{7}
6	(France) Antoine Hoang	3	6^{4}
2	(Italy) Jannik Sinner	6	7^{7}

Final
10	(Austria) Sebastian Ofner	2	4
2	(Italy) Jannik Sinner	6	6

=== Top half ===
==== Section 1 ====
First round
(Italy) M Viola	4	5
(Italy) A Pellegrino	6	7
(Italy) L Vanni	7^{7}	6
(Switzerland) S Ehrat	6^{4}	3
(France) Baptiste Crepatte	6	6
(Italy) R Brancaccio	3	4
(Russia) A Karatsev	3	6	3
PR	(Austria) M Neuchrist	6	3	6

Second round
1	(Italy) S Travaglia	6^{2}	6^{4}
(Italy) A Pellegrino	7^{7}	7^{7}
(Italy) L Vanni	6	6^{3}	6
16/WC	(Italy) F Baldi	4	7^{7}	3
12	(United States) M Cressy	6	7^{7}
(France) B Crepatte	1	6^{4}
PR	(Austria) M Neuchrist	4	3
5	(Germany) P Gojowczyk	6	6

Third round
(Italy) A Pellegrino	0	2
(Italy) L Vanni	6	6
12	(United States) M Cressy	6^{4}	2
5	(Germany) P Gojowczyk	7^{7}	6

Quarterfinals
(Italy) L Vanni	6	6
5	(Germany) P Gojowczyk	0	3

==== Section 2 ====
First round
WC	(Italy) L Musetti	6	6
(Germany) B Hassan	4	2
(France) M Hamou	6^{4}	7^{11}	6^{4}
Q	(Bosnia and Herzegovina) A Šetkić	7^{7}	6^{9}	7^{7}
Q	(Italy) F Forti	6	6
(Czech Republic) V Šafránek	3	4
WC	(Italy) Patric Prinoth	2	2
(Italy) S Napolitano	6	6

Second round
4	(Italy) G Mager	4	5
WC	(Italy) L Musetti	6	7
Q	(Bosnia and Herzegovina) A Šetkić	6^{6}	7	5
14	(Spain) B Zapata Miralles	7^{8}	5	7
10	(Austria) S Ofner	6	6
Q	(Italy) F Forti	2	3
(Italy) S Napolitano	3	6^{5}
7	(Austria) D Novak	6	7^{7}

Third round
WC	(Italy) L Musetti	6	6
14	(Spain) B Zapata Miralles	4	0
10	(Austria) S Ofner	3	6	7^{8}
7	(Austria) D Novak	6	3	6^{6}

Quarterfinals
WC	(Italy) L Musetti	6^{5}	2
10	(Austria) S Ofner	7^{7}	6

=== Bottom half ===
==== Section 3 ====
First round
(Bosnia and Herzegovina) M Bašić	4	6^{6}
WC	(Italy) E Dalla Valle	6	7^{8}
(Dominican Republic) J Hernández-Fernández	6	6^{2}	4
(United Kingdom) J Choinski	4	7^{7}	6
(Italy) A Arnaboldi	4	2
Alt	(Italy) J Ocleppo	6	6
(Germany) J Lenz	6^{3}	6	3
(Germany) D Masur	7^{7}	4	6

Second round
6	(France) A Hoang	6^{4}	6	6
WC	(Italy) E Dalla Valle	7^{7}	3	3
(United Kingdom) J Choinski	7^{11}	6
9	(Germany) O Otte	6^{9}	3
15	(France) E Benchetrit	6	6
Alt	(Italy) J Ocleppo	3	0
(Germany) D Masur	6	3	4
3	(Italy) S Caruso	4	6	6

Third round
6	(France) A Hoang	7	6
(United Kingdom) J Choinski	5	4
15	(France) E Benchetrit	6	6
3	(Italy) S Caruso	3	2

Quarterfinals
6	(France) A Hoang	6	6
15	(France) E Benchetrit	2	0

==== Section 4 ====
First round
(Croatia) V Galović	4	7^{7}	6
(Russia) T Gabashvili	6	6^{5}	4
(Brazil) G Clezar	4	7^{7}	1
(Belarus) U Ignatik	6	6^{4}	6
WC	(Italy) Erwin Tröbinger	1	4
(Italy) G Zeppieri	6	6
(Austria) L Miedler	7^{7}	1	6
(Italy) GM Moroni	6^{2}	6	2

Second round
8	(Italy) F Gaio	7^{7}	5	6
(Croatia) V Galović	6^{4}	7	3
(Belarus) U Ignatik	7^{7}	6^{7}	1
11	(Serbia) D Petrović	6^{3}	7^{9}	6
13	(Italy) R Marcora	4	6	7
(Italy) G Zeppieri	6	3	5
(Austria) L Miedler	6^{5}	5
2	(Italy) J Sinner	7^{7}	7

Third round
8	(Italy) F Gaio	6	6
11	(Serbia) D Petrović	4	4
13	(Italy) R Marcora	3	4
2	(Italy) J Sinner	6	6

Quarterfinals
8	(Italy) F Gaio	4	4
2	(Italy) J Sinner	6	6
