= 2018 Sparkassen ATP Challenger =

Tennis tournament

- Date: 8–14 October
- Edition: 9th
- Surface: Hard, Indoors
- Location: Ortisei, Italy

Champions

Singles
- (France) Ugo Humbert

Doubles
- (Belgium) Sander Gillé / (Belgium) Joran Vliegen
← 2017 ·	Sparkassen ATP Challenger	· 2019 →

The 2018 Sparkassen ATP Challenger was a professional tennis tournament played on indoor hard courts in Ortisei, Italy between 8 and 14 October 2018. It was the ninth edition of the tournament which was part of the 2018 ATP Challenger Tour.

== Singles main-draw entrants ==
=== Seeds ===
Country	Player	Rank^{1}	Seed
FRA	Pierre-Hugues Herbert	53	1
SVK	Lukáš Lacko	80	2
ESP	Jaume Munar	82	3
ITA	Lorenzo Sonego	89	4
LTU	Ričardas Berankis	107	5
FRA	Ugo Humbert	109	6
~~GER~~	~~Yannick Maden~~	~~114~~	~~7~~
GER	Matthias Bachinger	134	8

- ^{1} Rankings are as of 1 October 2018.

=== Other entrants ===
The following players received wildcards into the singles main draw:

- (Italy) Raúl Brancaccio
- (Italy) Liam Caruana
- (Italy) Luca Giacomini
- (Italy) Jannik Sinner

The following players received entry from the qualifying draw:

- (Germany) Benjamin Hassan
- (Russia) Kirill Kivattsev
- (Germany) Kevin Krawietz
- (Germany) Tobias Simon

The following player received entry as a lucky loser:

- (Italy) Fabrizio Ornago

== Champions ==
=== Singles ===
- (France) Ugo Humbert def. (France) Pierre-Hugues Herbert 6–4, 6–2.

=== Doubles ===
- (Belgium) Sander Gillé / (Belgium) Joran Vliegen def. (India) Purav Raja / (Croatia) Antonio Šančić 3–6, 6–3, [10–3].
