= 2017 Sparkassen ATP Challenger – Singles =

Singles
- 2017 Sparkassen ATP Challenger

Final
- Champion: (Italy) Lorenzo Sonego
- Runner-up: (Germany) Tim Pütz
- Score: 6–4, 6–4

Events
Singles	Doubles
← 2016 ·	Sparkassen ATP Challenger	· 2018 →

Stefano Napolitano was the defending champion but lost in the second round to Matteo Donati.

Lorenzo Sonego won the title after defeating Tim Pütz 6–4, 6–4 in the final.

== Seeds ==
1. (Romania) Marius Copil (withdrew)
2. (Slovakia) Norbert Gombos (first round)
3. (Italy) Andreas Seppi (quarterfinals)
4. (France) Pierre-Hugues Herbert (semifinals)
5. (Hungary) Márton Fucsovics (first round)
6. (Germany) Dustin Brown (second round)
7. (Germany) Oscar Otte (quarterfinals)
8. (Austria) Sebastian Ofner (second round)

== Draw ==
=== Key ===
- Q = Qualifier
- WC = Wild card
- LL = Lucky loser
- Alt = Alternate
- SE = Special exempt
- PR = Protected ranking
- ITF = ITF entry
- JE = Junior exempt
- w/o = Walkover
- r = Retired
- d = Defaulted
- SR = Special ranking

=== Finals ===
Semifinals
Q	(Germany) Tim Pütz	6^{2}	6	7^{7}
4	(France) Pierre-Hugues Herbert	7^{7}	1	6^{5}
WC	(Italy) Matteo Donati	6^{6}	6^{1}
WC	(Italy) Lorenzo Sonego	7^{8}	7^{7}

Final
Q	(Germany) Tim Pütz	4	4
WC	(Italy) Lorenzo Sonego	6	6

=== Top half ===
First round
LL	(Italy) A Arnaboldi	7^{7}	6
WC	(Italy) Patrick Prader	6^{5}	2
(Croatia) V Galović	6	3	6
(Germany) Jeremy Jahn	3	6	3
Q	(Germany) T Pütz	6	6
Q	(Germany) K Krawietz	1	1
(France) M Bourgue	6	1	3
8	(Austria) S Ofner	1	6	6
4	(France) P-H Herbert	6	6
(Lithuania) L Grigelis	3	4
(France) K de Schepper	7^{7}	6
(Lithuania) R Berankis	6^{3}	4
PR	(Netherlands) I Sijsling	1	4
Q	(Germany) Marc Sieber	6	6
LL	(Israel) E Leshem	3	5
6	(Germany) D Brown	6	7

Second round
LL	(Italy) A Arnaboldi	4	3
(Croatia) V Galović	6	6
Q	(Germany) T Pütz	6	6^{3}	6
8	(Austria) S Ofner	3	7^{7}	2
4	(France) P-H Herbert	7^{7}	6
(France) K de Schepper	6^{5}	4
Q	(Germany) M Sieber	2	7^{7}	7^{7}
6	(Germany) D Brown	6	6^{3}	6^{5}

Quarterfinals
(Croatia) V Galović	4	7^{7}	2
Q	(Germany) T Pütz	6	6^{1}	6
4	(France) P-H Herbert	7^{7}	3	6
Q	(Germany) M Sieber	6^{3}	6	3

Semifinals
Q	(Germany) T Pütz	6^{2}	6	7^{7}
4	(France) P-H Herbert	7^{7}	1	6^{5}

=== Bottom half ===
First round
5	(Hungary) M Fucsovics	6	4	4
(Italy) S Napolitano	4	6	6
(Spain) N Kuhn	7^{7}	6^{3}	4
WC	(Italy) M Donati	6^{4}	7^{7}	6
(Italy) S Caruso	6	7^{7}
(Spain) P Martínez	3	6^{1}
(Poland) J Janowicz	2	2
3	(Italy) A Seppi	6	6
7	(Germany) O Otte	6	4	7^{7}
WC	(Italy) F Gaio	4	6	6^{2}
(Spain) B Zapata Miralles	6	6
(France) S Robert	3	0
Q	(Italy) M Viola	7^{7}	5	7
(France) T Lamasine	6^{4}	7	5
WC	(Italy) L Sonego	2	7	6
2	(Slovakia) N Gombos	6	5	4

Second round
(Italy) S Napolitano	6	4	5
WC	(Italy) M Donati	4	6	7
(Italy) S Caruso	7^{8}	4	4
3	(Italy) A Seppi	6^{6}	6	6
7	(Germany) O Otte	6^{2}	6	6
(Spain) B Zapata Miralles	7^{7}	1	4
Q	(Italy) M Viola	4	1
WC	(Italy) L Sonego	6	6

Quarterfinals
WC	(Italy) M Donati	7^{7}	7^{7}
3	(Italy) A Seppi	6^{5}	6^{5}
7	(Germany) O Otte	1	4
WC	(Italy) L Sonego	6	6

Semifinals
WC	(Italy) M Donati	6^{6}	6^{1}
WC	(Italy) L Sonego	7^{8}	7^{7}
