= 2016 Sparkassen ATP Challenger – Singles =

Singles
- 2016 Sparkassen ATP Challenger

Final
- Champion: (Italy) Stefano Napolitano
- Runner-up: (Italy) Alessandro Giannessi
- Score: 6–4, 6–1

Events
Singles	Doubles
← 2015 ·	Sparkassen ATP Challenger	· 2017 →

Ričardas Berankis was the defending champion but chose not to defend his title.

Stefano Napolitano won the title after defeating Alessandro Giannessi 6–4, 6–1 in the final.

== Seeds ==
1. (Germany) Benjamin Becker (second round)
2. (Russia) Evgeny Donskoy (second round)
3. (Italy) Alessandro Giannessi (final)
4. (Bosnia and Herzegovina) Mirza Bašić (quarterfinals)
5. (Serbia) Laslo Đere (first round)
6. (Serbia) Marko Tepavac (first round)
7. (Italy) Federico Gaio (quarterfinals)
8. (Serbia) Peđa Krstin (second round)

== Draw ==
=== Key ===
- Q = Qualifier
- WC = Wild card
- LL = Lucky loser
- Alt = Alternate
- SE = Special exempt
- PR = Protected ranking
- ITF = ITF entry
- JE = Junior exempt
- w/o = Walkover
- r = Retired
- d = Defaulted
- SR = Special ranking

=== Finals ===
Semifinals
(Italy) Lorenzo Sonego	6	5	4
3	(Italy) Alessandro Giannessi	3	7	6
(Italy) Stefano Napolitano	7	6
SE	(Germany) Kevin Krawietz	5	4

Final
3	(Italy) Alessandro Giannessi	4	1
(Italy) Stefano Napolitano	6	6

=== Top half ===
First round
1	(Germany) B Becker	6	6
Q	(Belgium) Julien Dubail	4	1
(Italy) L Vanni	3	6^{1}
(Italy) L Sonego	6	7^{7}
(Czech Republic) Z Kolář	2	2
(Serbia) N Milojević	6	6
WC	(Italy) Patrick Prader	3	4
7	(Italy) F Gaio	6	6
3	(Italy) A Giannessi	7	4	7^{9}
(Russia) A Bublik	5	6	6^{7}
(Spain) A Menéndez-Maceiras	6	6
WC	(Italy) M Berrettini	2	4
WC	(Italy) S Caruso	6	6
WC	(Italy) G Mager	4	4
(Germany) Jeremy Jahn	6	6
6	(Serbia) M Tepavac	3	4

Second round
1	(Germany) B Becker	1	6^{3}
(Italy) L Sonego	6	7^{7}
(Serbia) N Milojević	3	4
7	(Italy) F Gaio	6	6
3	(Italy) A Giannessi	7^{8}	6^{2}	6
(Spain) A Menéndez-Maceiras	6^{6}	7^{7}	1
WC	(Italy) S Caruso	6	4	7^{7}
(Germany) J Jahn	2	6	6^{3}

Quarterfinals
(Italy) L Sonego	7^{8}	6^{7}	6
7	(Italy) F Gaio	6^{6}	7^{9}	4
3	(Italy) A Giannessi	6	7^{7}
WC	(Italy) S Caruso	1	6^{3}

Semifinals
(Italy) L Sonego	6	5	4
3	(Italy) A Giannessi	3	7	6

=== Bottom half ===
First round
5	(Serbia) L Đere	3	3
PR	(France) A Olivetti	6	6
(Italy) A Arnaboldi	3	3
(Italy) S Napolitano	6	6
Q	(France) Y Jankovits	6	7^{7}
(Germany) Marc Sieber	2	6^{4}
Q	(Poland) M Przysiężny	6^{5}	6	4
4	(Bosnia and Herzegovina) M Bašić	7^{7}	4	6
8	(Serbia) P Krstin	7^{7}	6
LL	(Croatia) N Serdarušić	6^{2}	1
(Canada) F Dancevic	6	4	4
(Slovenia) B Kavčič	1	6	6
SE	(Germany) K Krawietz	6	6
(India) R Ramanathan	3	3
Q	(Poland) A Kapaś	7^{7}	5	6^{2}
2	(Russia) E Donskoy	6^{3}	7	7^{7}

Second round
PR	(France) A Olivetti	6^{4}	3
(Italy) S Napolitano	7^{7}	6
Q	(France) Y Jankovits	6	1	3
4	(Bosnia and Herzegovina) M Bašić	2	6	6
8	(Serbia) P Krstin	7	2	1
(Slovenia) B Kavčič	5	6	6
SE	(Germany) K Krawietz	3	6	7^{7}
2	(Russia) E Donskoy	6	4	6^{2}

Quarterfinals
(Italy) S Napolitano	6	6
4	(Bosnia and Herzegovina) M Bašić	4	4
(Slovenia) B Kavčič	0	4
SE	(Germany) K Krawietz	6	6

Semifinals
(Italy) S Napolitano	7	6
SE	(Germany) K Krawietz	5	4
