= 2015 Sparkassen ATP Challenger – Doubles =

Doubles
- 2015 Sparkassen ATP Challenger

Final
- Champion: (Austria) Maximilian Neuchrist (Austria) Tristan-Samuel Weissborn
- Runner-up: (Croatia) Nikola Mektić (Croatia) Antonio Šančić
- Score: 7–6^{(9–7)}, 6–3

Events
Singles	Doubles
← 2014 ·	Sparkassen ATP Challenger	· 2016 →

Maximilian Neuchrist and Tristan-Samuel Weissborn won the title, defeating Nikola Mektić and Antonio Šančić in the final 7–6^{(9–7)}, 6–3 .

== Seeds ==
1. (Australia) Carsten Ball / (Germany) Dustin Brown (quarterfinals)
2. (Poland) Tomasz Bednarek / (Ukraine) Denys Molchanov (semifinals)
3. (Croatia) Nikola Mektić / (Croatia) Antonio Šančić (final)
4. (Lithuania) Laurynas Grigelis / (Italy) Alessandro Motti (first round)

== Draw ==
=== Key ===
- Q = Qualifier
- WC = Wild card
- LL = Lucky loser
- Alt = Alternate
- SE = Special exempt
- PR = Protected ranking
- ITF = ITF entry
- JE = Junior exempt
- w/o = Walkover
- r = Retired
- d = Defaulted
- SR = Special ranking

=== Draw ===
First round
1	(Australia) C Ball (Germany) D Brown	6	6
Alt	(Italy) Francesco Borgo (Italy) S Caruso	3	4
(Germany) K Krawietz (Germany) M Marterer	6	4	[7]
(Austria) M Neuchrist (Austria) T-S Weissborn	3	6	[10]
4	(Lithuania) L Grigelis (Italy) A Motti	0r
(Italy) Erik Crepaldi (France) Y Jankovits	3
(Croatia) I Sabanov (Croatia) M Sabanov	6	6
(Italy) M Bortolotti (Serbia) Ilija Vučić	3	4
WC	(Russia) D Tursunov (Italy) A Virgili	7	6
(Romania) P Grigoriu (Romania) C Pavăl	5	2
(Italy) F Gaio (Italy) A Giannessi	1	6	[7]
3	(Croatia) N Mektić (Croatia) A Šančić	6	4	[10]
(Bosnia and Herzegovina) M Bašić (Romania) P-A Luncanu	2	2
(India) R Ramanathan (Italy) Matteo Volante	6	6
WC	(Italy) Edoardo Eremin (Italy) L Giustino	4	2
2	(Poland) T Bednarek (Ukraine) D Molchanov	6	6

Quarterfinals
1	(Australia) C Ball (Germany) D Brown	3	6	[9]
(Austria) M Neuchrist (Austria) T-S Weissborn	6	1	[11]
(Italy) E Crepaldi (France) Y Jankovits	3	1
(Croatia) I Sabanov (Croatia) M Sabanov	6	6
(Russia) D Tursunov (Italy) A Virgili	7^{8}	4	[2]
3	(Croatia) N Mektić (Croatia) A Šančić	6^{6}	6	[10]
(India) R Ramanathan (Italy) M Volante	3	4
2	(Poland) T Bednarek (Ukraine) D Molchanov	6	6

Semifinals
(Austria) M Neuchrist (Austria) T-S Weissborn	6	2	[10]
(Croatia) I Sabanov (Croatia) M Sabanov	4	6	[3]
3	(Croatia) N Mektić (Croatia) A Šančić	6	6
2	(Poland) T Bednarek (Ukraine) D Molchanov	1	3

Final
(Austria) M Neuchrist (Austria) T-S Weissborn	7^{9}	6
3	(Croatia) N Mektić (Croatia) A Šančić	6^{7}	3
