= 2019 Sparkassen ATP Challenger =

- Date: 11–17 November
- Edition: 10th
- Surface: Hard, Indoors
- Location: Ortisei, Italy

Champions

Singles
- (Italy) Jannik Sinner

Doubles
- (Serbia) Nikola Ćaćić / (Croatia) Antonio Šančić
← 2018 ·	Sparkassen ATP Challenger	· 2020 →

The 2019 Sparkassen ATP Challenger was a professional tennis tournament played on indoor hard courts in Ortisei, Italy between 11 and 17 November 2019. It was the tenth edition of the tournament which was part of the 2019 ATP Challenger Tour.

== Singles main-draw entrants ==
=== Seeds ===
Country	Player	Rank^{1}	Seed
ITA	Stefano Travaglia	86	1
ITA	Jannik Sinner	95	2
ITA	Salvatore Caruso	97	3
ITA	Gianluca Mager	119	4
GER	Peter Gojowczyk	122	5
FRA	Antoine Hoang	125	6
AUT	Dennis Novak	126	7
ITA	Federico Gaio	154	8
GER	Oscar Otte	163	9
AUT	Sebastian Ofner	166	10
SRB	Danilo Petrović	172	11
USA	Maxime Cressy	183	12
ITA	Roberto Marcora	190	13
ESP	Bernabé Zapata Miralles	206	14
FRA	Elliot Benchetrit	208	15
ITA	Filippo Baldi	214	16

- ^{1} Rankings are as of 4 November 2019.

=== Other entrants ===
The following players received wildcards into the singles main draw:

- (Italy) Filippo Baldi
- (Italy) Enrico Dalla Valle
- (Italy) Lorenzo Musetti
- (Italy) Patric Prinoth
- (Italy) Erwin Tröbinger

The following player received entry into the singles main draw using a protected ranking:

- (Austria) Maximilian Neuchrist

The following player received entry into the singles main draw as an alternate:

- (Italy) Julian Ocleppo

The following players received entry from the qualifying draw:

- (Italy) Francesco Forti
- (Bosnia and Herzegovina) Aldin Šetkić

== Champions ==
=== Singles ===
- (Italy) Jannik Sinner def. (Austria) Sebastian Ofner 6–2, 6–4.

=== Doubles ===
- (Serbia) Nikola Ćaćić / (Croatia) Antonio Šančić def. (Netherlands) Sander Arends / (Netherlands) David Pel 6–7^{(5–7)}, 7–6^{(7–3)}, [10–7].
