= 2017 Sparkassen ATP Challenger – Doubles =

Doubles
- 2017 Sparkassen ATP Challenger

Final
- Champions: (Netherlands) Sander Arends (Croatia) Antonio Šančić
- Runners-up: (Germany) Jeremy Jahn (Israel) Edan Leshem
- Score: 6–2, 5–7, [13–11]

Events
Singles	Doubles
← 2016 ·	Sparkassen ATP Challenger	· 2018 →

Kevin Krawietz and Albano Olivetti were the defending champions but lost in the first round to Tomasz Bednarek and David Pel.

Sander Arends and Antonio Šančić won the title after defeating Jeremy Jahn and Edan Leshem 6–2, 5–7, [13–11] in the final.

== Seeds ==
1. (Netherlands) Sander Arends / (Croatia) Antonio Šančić (champions)
2. (Sweden) Johan Brunström / (Slovakia) Igor Zelenay (first round)
3. (Germany) Kevin Krawietz / (France) Albano Olivetti (first round)
4. (Germany) Alexander Satschko / (Austria) Tristan-Samuel Weissborn (semifinals)

== Draw ==
=== Key ===
- Q = Qualifier
- WC = Wild card
- LL = Lucky loser
- Alt = Alternate
- SE = Special exempt
- PR = Protected ranking
- ITF = ITF entry
- JE = Junior exempt
- w/o = Walkover
- r = Retired
- d = Defaulted
- SR = Special ranking

First round
1	(Netherlands) S Arends (Croatia) A Šančić	7^{7}	7^{8}
(Spain) P Martínez (Spain) D Vega Hernández	6^{2}	6^{6}
WC	(Slovakia) N Gombos (Slovakia) L Klein	7	6
(France) T Lamasine (France) H Nys	5	3
4	(Germany) A Satschko (Austria) T-S Weissborn	6	7
WC	(Italy) Jonas Ciechi (Italy) Erwin Tröbinger	2	5
(Lithuania) L Grigelis (Australia) R Junaid	6^{4}	3
(Italy) S Caruso (Italy) F Gaio	7^{7}	6
(United Kingdom) S Clayton (United Kingdom) J O'Mara	7^{7}	7^{7}
(Germany) D Brown (Germany) T Pütz	6^{1}	6^{5}
(Poland) T Bednarek (Netherlands) D Pel	3	7^{7}	[10]
3	(Germany) K Krawietz (France) A Olivetti	6	6^{2}	[5]
(Germany) Jeremy Jahn (Israel) E Leshem	6	7^{7}
WC	(Italy) Michael Kerschbaumer (Italy) Patric Prinoth	3	6^{4}
PR	(France) S Robert (Netherlands) I Sijsling	3	6	[10]
2	(Sweden) J Brunström (Slovakia) I Zelenay	6	3	[6]

Quarterfinals
1	(Netherlands) S Arends (Croatia) A Šančić	w/o
WC	(Slovakia) N Gombos (Slovakia) L Klein
4	(Germany) A Satschko (Austria) T-S Weissborn	6^{4}	6	[10]
(Italy) S Caruso (Italy) F Gaio	7^{7}	4	[8]
(United Kingdom) S Clayton (United Kingdom) J O'Mara	7	7^{7}
(Poland) T Bednarek (Netherlands) D Pel	5	6^{5}
(Germany) J Jahn (Israel) E Leshem	2	6	[10]
PR	(France) S Robert (Netherlands) I Sijsling	6	3	[7]

Semifinals
1	(Netherlands) S Arends (Croatia) A Šančić	5	6	[10]
4	(Germany) A Satschko (Austria) T-S Weissborn	7	4	[3]
(United Kingdom) S Clayton (United Kingdom) J O'Mara	6^{4}	7	[11]
(Germany) J Jahn (Israel) E Leshem	7^{7}	5	[13]

Final
1	(Netherlands) S Arends (Croatia) A Šančić	6	5	[13]
(Germany) J Jahn (Israel) E Leshem	2	7	[11]
