= 2018 Sparkassen ATP Challenger – Doubles =

Doubles
- 2018 Sparkassen ATP Challenger

Final
- Champions: (Belgium) Sander Gillé (Belgium) Joran Vliegen
- Runners-up: (India) Purav Raja (Croatia) Antonio Šančić
- Score: 3–6, 6–3, [10–3]

Events
Singles	Doubles
← 2017 ·	Sparkassen ATP Challenger	· 2019 →

Sander Arends and Antonio Šančić were the defending champions but only Šančić chose to defend his title, partnering Purav Raja. Šančić lost in the finals to Sander Gillé and Joran Vliegen.

Gillé and Vliegen won the title after defeating Raja and Šančić 3–6, 6–3, [10–3] in the final.

== Seeds ==
1. (United Kingdom) Luke Bambridge / (United Kingdom) Jonny O'Mara (semifinals)
2. (Germany) Kevin Krawietz / (Germany) Andreas Mies (semifinals)
3. (India) Purav Raja / (Croatia) Antonio Šančić (final)
4. (Belgium) Sander Gillé / (Belgium) Joran Vliegen (champions)

== Draw ==
=== Key ===
- Q = Qualifier
- WC = Wild card
- LL = Lucky loser
- Alt = Alternate
- ITF = ITF entry
- PR = Protected ranking
- SR = Special ranking
- SE = Special exempt
- JE = Junior exempt
- JR = Junior Accelerator Programme entrant
- CO = College Accelerator Programme entrant
- NG = Next Gen Accelerator Program entrant
- w/o = Walkover
- r = Retired
- d = Defaulted

First round
1	(United Kingdom) L Bambridge (United Kingdom) J O'Mara	6	6^{6}	[10]
(France) F Martin (Italy) J Ocleppo	3	7^{8}	[8]
(Italy) S Bolelli (Croatia) V Galović	6	6^{5}	[7]
WC	(Italy) S Napolitano (Italy) J Sinner	3	7^{7}	[10]
4	(Belgium) S Gillé (Belgium) J Vliegen	7^{7}	7
WC	(Italy) Patric Prinoth (Italy) Alexander Weis	6^{5}	5
WC	(Italy) R Brancaccio (Italy) Luca Giacomini	5	6^{2}
(Croatia) I Sabanov (Croatia) M Sabanov	7	7^{7}
(Slovakia) L Lacko (Ukraine) S Stakhovsky	6	7
(Germany) M Moraing (Germany) O Otte	2	5
(Italy) D Bracciali (Italy) A Vavassori	6^{2}	3
3	(India) P Raja (Croatia) A Šančić	7^{7}	6
(Bosnia and Herzegovina) T Brkić (Croatia) A Pavić	6	4	[6]
(Germany) D Brown (Austria) D Novak	4	6	[10]
(France) B Bonzi (France) Q Halys	6^{5}	6	[6]
2	(Germany) K Krawietz (Germany) A Mies	7^{7}	3	[10]

Quarterfinals
1	(United Kingdom) L Bambridge (United Kingdom) J O'Mara	w/o
WC	(Italy) S Napolitano (Italy) J Sinner
4	(Belgium) S Gillé (Belgium) J Vliegen	6	6
(Croatia) I Sabanov (Croatia) M Sabanov	4	4
(Slovakia) L Lacko (Ukraine) S Stakhovsky
3	(India) P Raja (Croatia) A Šančić	w/o
(Germany) D Brown (Austria) D Novak	3	7^{7}	[4]
2	(Germany) K Krawietz (Germany) A Mies	6	6^{2}	[10]

Semifinals
1	(United Kingdom) L Bambridge (United Kingdom) J O'Mara	7^{7}	6^{3}	[6]
4	(Belgium) S Gillé (Belgium) J Vliegen	6^{4}	7^{7}	[10]
3	(India) P Raja (Croatia) A Šančić	7	7^{7}
2	(Germany) K Krawietz (Germany) A Mies	5	6^{2}

Final
4	(Belgium) S Gillé (Belgium) J Vliegen	3	6	[10]
3	(India) P Raja (Croatia) A Šančić	6	3	[3]
