= 2015 Sparkassen ATP Challenger =

- Date: 9–15 November
- Edition: 6th
- Surface: Hard, Indoors
- Location: Ortisei, Italy

Champions

Singles
- (Lithuania) Ričardas Berankis

Doubles
- (Austria) Maximilian Neuchrist / (Austria) Tristan-Samuel Weissborn
| ← 2014 · | Sparkassen ATP Challenger | · 2016 → |

The 2015 Sparkassen ATP Challenger was a professional tennis tournament played on indoor hard courts in Ortisei, Italy between 9 and 15 November 2015. It was the sixth edition of the tournament which was part of the 2015 ATP Challenger Tour.

== Singles main-draw entrants ==
=== Seeds ===
| Country | Player | Rank^{1} | Seed |
|---|---|---|---|
| LTU | Ričardas Berankis | 76 | 1 |
| RUS | Evgeny Donskoy | 94 | 2 |
| USA | Rajeev Ram | 101 | 3 |
| GER | Dustin Brown | 111 | 4 |
| GER | Michael Berrer | 112 | 5 |
| ITA | Luca Vanni | 121 | 6 |
| BIH | Mirza Bašić | 145 | 7 |
| ITA | Andrea Arnaboldi | 161 | 8 |

- ^{1} Rankings are as of November 2, 2015.

=== Other entrants ===
The following players received wildcards into the singles main draw:

- (Italy) Matteo Berrettini
- (Italy) Edoardo Eremin
- (Italy) Lorenzo Sonego
- (Russia) Dmitry Tursunov

The following players received entry from the qualifying draw:

- (Croatia) Viktor Galović
- (Germany) Kevin Krawietz
- (Croatia) Nikola Mektić
- (Austria) Maximilian Neuchrist

== Champions ==
=== Singles ===
- (Lithuania) Ričardas Berankis def. (United States) Rajeev Ram 7–6^{(7–3)}, 6–4

=== Doubles ===
- (Austria) Maximilian Neuchrist / (Austria) Tristan-Samuel Weissborn def. (Croatia) Nikola Mektic / (Croatia) Antonio Sancic 7–6^{(9–7)}, 6–3
