= 2020 Sparkassen ATP Challenger =

- Date: 16–22 November
- Edition: 11th
- Surface: Hard, Indoors
- Location: Ortisei, Italy

Champions

Singles
- (Belarus) Ilya Ivashka

Doubles
- (Germany) Andre Begemann / (France) Albano Olivetti
← 2019 ·	Sparkassen ATP Challenger	· 2021 →

The 2020 Sparkassen ATP Challenger was a professional tennis tournament played on indoor hard courts in Ortisei, Italy between 16 and 22 November 2020. It was the eleventh edition of the tournament and was part of the 2020 ATP Challenger Tour.

== Singles main-draw entrants ==
=== Seeds ===
Country	Player	Rank^{1}	Seed
JPN	Yasutaka Uchiyama	102	1
BLR	Ilya Ivashka	112	2
RUS	Aslan Karatsev	114	3
ITA	Lorenzo Musetti	126	4
FRA	Antoine Hoang	131	5
ITA	Federico Gaio	138	6
AUT	Jurij Rodionov	141	7
SVK	Martin Kližan	150	8

- ^{1} Rankings are as of 9 November 2020.

=== Other entrants ===
The following players received wildcards into the singles main draw:

- (Italy) Luca Nardi
- (Italy) Patric Prinoth
- (Italy) Giulio Zeppieri

The following player received entry into the singles main draw as a special exempt:

- (Slovakia) Lukáš Klein

The following players received entry from the qualifying draw:

- (Turkey) Altuğ Çelikbilek
- (Germany) Johannes Härteis
- (Russia) Pavel Kotov
- (Italy) Andrea Pellegrino

The following players received entry as lucky losers:

- (Russia) Evgeny Karlovskiy
- (Russia) Alexey Vatutin

== Champions ==
=== Singles ===
- (Belarus) Ilya Ivashka def. (France) Antoine Hoang 6–4, 3–6, 7–6^{(7–3)}.

=== Doubles ===
- (Germany) Andre Begemann / (France) Albano Olivetti def. (Croatia) Ivan Sabanov / (Croatia) Matej Sabanov 6–3, 6–2.
