= 2021 Sparkassen ATP Challenger – Doubles =

Doubles
- 2021 Sparkassen ATP Challenger

Final
- Champions: (Croatia) Antonio Šančić (Austria) Tristan-Samuel Weissborn
- Runners-up: (Austria) Alexander Erler (Austria) Lucas Miedler
- Score: 7–6^{(10–8)}, 4–6, [10–8]

Events
Singles	Doubles
- Sparkassen ATP Challenger

Andre Begemann and Albano Olivetti were the defending champions but chose not to defend their title.

Antonio Šančić and Tristan-Samuel Weissborn won the title after defeating Alexander Erler and Lucas Miedler 7–6^{(10–8)}, 4–6, [10–8] in the final.

== Seeds ==
1. (Croatia) Ivan Sabanov / (Croatia) Matej Sabanov (semifinals)
2. (Croatia) Antonio Šančić / (Austria) Tristan-Samuel Weissborn (champions)
3. (Austria) Alexander Erler / (Austria) Lucas Miedler (final)
4. (Ecuador) Diego Hidalgo / (Ecuador) Roberto Quiroz (first round)

== Draw ==
Key

- Q = Qualifier
- WC = Wild card
- LL = Lucky loser
- Alt = Alternate
- ITF = ITF entry
- PR = Protected ranking
- SR = Special ranking
- SE = Special exempt
- JE = Junior exempt
- JR = Junior Accelerator Programme entrant
- CO = College Accelerator Programme entrant
- NG = Next Gen Accelerator Program entrant
- w/o = Walkover
- r = Retired
- d = Defaulted

First round
1	(Croatia) I Sabanov (Croatia) M Sabanov	6	4	[10]
(Romania) M Copil (Ecuador) E Gómez	2	6	[6]
(Bosnia and Herzegovina) N Fatić (Bosnia and Herzegovina) A Šetkić	5	3
(Russia) Kirill Kivattsev (Italy) Augusto Virgili	7	6
3	(Austria) A Erler (Austria) L Miedler	6	6
WC	(Italy) Patric Prinoth (Italy) Alexander Weis	3	2
(Italy) F Forti (Italy) F Gaio	6	6
(Zimbabwe) B Lock (Zimbabwe) CJ Lock	3	1
(Ukraine) V Sachko (Netherlands) T van Rijthoven	7^{7}	7^{7}
(Moldova) A Cozbinov (United States) M Cressy	6^{4}	6^{2}
(United Kingdom) J Draper (Croatia) B Gojo	6	7^{7}
4	(Ecuador) D Hidalgo (Ecuador) R Quiroz	4	6^{4}
WC	(Italy) M Arnaldi (Italy) Samuel Vincent Ruggeri	6	6^{2}	[10]
WC	(Italy) Gabriel Moroder (Italy) Erwin Tröbinger	1	7^{7}	[8]
(Austria) D Pichler (Czech Republic) D Poljak	6^{4}	7^{11}	[4]
2	(Croatia) A Šančić (Austria) T-S Weissborn	7^{7}	6^{9}	[10]

Quarterfinals
1	(Croatia) I Sabanov (Croatia) M Sabanov	6	6
(Russia) K Kivattsev (Italy) A Virgili	2	2
3	(Austria) A Erler (Austria) L Miedler	6	7^{7}
(Italy) F Forti (Italy) F Gaio	2	6^{5}
(Ukraine) V Sachko (Netherlands) T van Rijthoven	7^{7}	3	[4]
(United Kingdom) J Draper (Croatia) B Gojo	6^{5}	6	[10]
WC	(Italy) M Arnaldi (Italy) S Vincent Ruggeri	4	4
2	(Croatia) A Šančić (Austria) T-S Weissborn	6	6

Semifinals
1	(Croatia) I Sabanov (Croatia) M Sabanov	5	3
3	(Austria) A Erler (Austria) L Miedler	7	6
(United Kingdom) J Draper (Croatia) B Gojo	6	3	[8]
2	(Croatia) A Šančić (Austria) T-S Weissborn	3	6	[10]

Final
3	(Austria) A Erler (Austria) L Miedler	6^{8}	6	[8]
2	(Croatia) A Šančić (Austria) T-S Weissborn	7^{10}	4	[10]
