= 2022 Sparkassen ATP Challenger – Singles =

Singles
- 2022 Sparkassen ATP Challenger

Final
- Champion: (Croatia) Borna Gojo
- Runner-up: (Slovakia) Lukáš Klein
- Score: 7–6^{(7–4)}, 6–3

Events
Singles	Doubles
- Sparkassen ATP Challenger

Oscar Otte was the defending champion but chose not to defend his title.

Borna Gojo won the title after defeating Lukáš Klein 7–6^{(7–4)}, 6–3 in the final.

== Seeds ==
1. (Czech Republic) Tomáš Macháč (quarterfinals)
2. (Chile) Nicolás Jarry (first round)
3. (Italy) Luca Nardi (quarterfinals)
4. (Germany) Yannick Hanfmann (second round)
5. (Italy) Giulio Zeppieri (quarterfinals)
6. (Italy) Flavio Cobolli (semifinals)
7. (Slovakia) Lukáš Klein (final)
8. (Hungary) Fábián Marozsán (first round)

== Draw ==
Key

- Q = Qualifier
- WC = Wild card
- LL = Lucky loser
- Alt = Alternate
- ITF = ITF entry
- PR = Protected ranking
- SR = Special ranking
- SE = Special exempt
- JE = Junior exempt
- JR = Junior Accelerator Programme entrant
- CO = College Accelerator Programme entrant
- NG = Next Gen Accelerator Program entrant
- w/o = Walkover
- r = Retired
- d = Defaulted

=== Finals ===
Semifinals
(Italy) Andrea Vavassori	6^{5}	4
7	(Slovakia) Lukáš Klein	7^{7}	6
(Croatia) Borna Gojo	6	6
6	(Italy) Flavio Cobolli	1	1

Final
7	(Slovakia) Lukáš Klein	6^{4}	3
(Croatia) Borna Gojo	7^{7}	6

=== Top half ===
First round
1	(Czech Republic) T Macháč	6	6
Q	(Czech Republic) A Paulson	4	1
(France) A Escoffier	7^{7}	6
Alt	(Italy) M Bellucci	6^{3}	4
Q	(Austria) S Kopp	6^{7}	6	7
Q	(France) T Atmane	7^{9}	3	5
(Italy) A Vavassori	3	6	6
8	(Hungary) F Marozsán	6	1	3
3/WC	(Italy) L Nardi	7^{7}	6
Q	A Kachmazov	6^{4}	4
(Germany) P Gojowczyk	2	1
Q	E Karlovskiy	6	6
(Italy) A Arnaboldi	2	3
(Bosnia and Herzegovina) N Fatić	6	6
Alt	(Bosnia and Herzegovina) M Bašić	3	4
7	(Slovakia) L Klein	6	6

Second round
1	(Czech Republic) T Macháč	6	6
(France) A Escoffier	3	1
Q	(Austria) S Kopp	3	4
(Italy) A Vavassori	6	6
3/WC	(Italy) L Nardi	6	6
Q	E Karlovskiy	0	4
(Bosnia and Herzegovina) N Fatić	3	2^{r}
7	(Slovakia) L Klein	6	2

Quarterfinals
1	(Czech Republic) T Macháč	6	3	4
(Italy) A Vavassori	1	6	6
3/WC	(Italy) L Nardi	1	6	1
7	(Slovakia) L Klein	6	3	6

Semifinals
(Italy) A Vavassori	6^{5}	4
7	(Slovakia) L Klein	7^{7}	6

=== Bottom half ===
First round
5	(Italy) G Zeppieri	6	6
Q	(Czech Republic) P Nouza	3	4
WC	(Italy) S Travaglia	2	6	6
(Italy) F Maestrelli	6	3	4
(Italy) M Gigante	2	4
(Croatia) B Gojo	6	6
(Italy) A Seppi	7	3	4
4	(Germany) Y Hanfmann	5	6	6
6	(Italy) F Cobolli	7^{7}	6
Alt	(Italy) L Giustino	6^{4}	4
WC	(Italy) F Arnaboldi	4	6	1
(Switzerland) A Ritschard	6	2	6
(Argentina) M Trungelliti	4	6	6
LL	(Romania) M Copil	6	4	3
(Czech Republic) L Rosol	4	6	7^{7}
2	(Chile) N Jarry	6	4	6^{4}

Second round
5	(Italy) G Zeppieri	6	6
WC	(Italy) S Travaglia	3	2
(Croatia) B Gojo	7^{7}	6
4	(Germany) Y Hanfmann	6^{3}	2
6	(Italy) F Cobolli	7	6
(Switzerland) A Ritschard	5	1
(Argentina) M Trungelliti	6^{6}	6^{4}
(Czech Republic) L Rosol	7^{8}	7^{7}

Quarterfinals
5	(Italy) G Zeppieri	5	2
(Croatia) B Gojo	7	6
6	(Italy) F Cobolli	7^{7}	4	6
(Czech Republic) L Rosol	6^{5}	6	2

Semifinals
(Croatia) B Gojo	6	6
6	(Italy) F Cobolli	1	1
