= 2016 Sparkassen ATP Challenger =

- Date: 7–13 November
- Edition: 7th
- Surface: Hard, Indoors
- Location: Ortisei, Italy

Champions

Singles
- (Italy) Stefano Napolitano

Doubles
- (Germany) Kevin Krawietz / (France) Albano Olivetti
← 2015 ·	Sparkassen ATP Challenger	· 2017 →

The 2016 Sparkassen ATP Challenger was a professional tennis tournament played on indoor hard courts in Ortisei, Italy between 7 and 13 November 2016. It was the seventh edition of the tournament which was part of the 2016 ATP Challenger Tour.

== Singles main-draw entrants ==
=== Seeds ===
Country	Player	Rank^{1}	Seed
GER	Benjamin Becker	111	1
RUS	Evgeny Donskoy	118	2
ITA	Alessandro Giannessi	139	3
BIH	Mirza Bašić	158	4
SRB	Laslo Đere	171	5
SRB	Marko Tepavac	175	6
ITA	Federico Gaio	184	7
SRB	Peđa Krstin	188	8

- ^{1} Rankings are as of October 31, 2016.

=== Other entrants ===
The following players received wildcards into the singles main draw:

- (Italy) Patrick Prader
- (Italy) Matteo Berrettini
- (Italy) Salvatore Caruso
- (Italy) Gianluca Mager

The following player received entry into the singles main draw using a protected ranking:

- (France) Albano Olivetti

The following player received entry into the singles main draw as a special exempt:

- (Germany) Kevin Krawietz

The following players received entry from the qualifying draw:

- (Belgium) Julien Dubail
- (France) Yannick Jankovits
- (Poland) Andriej Kapaś
- (Poland) Michał Przysiężny

The following player received entry as a lucky loser:

- (Croatia) Nino Serdarušić

== Champions ==
=== Singles ===
- (Italy) Stefano Napolitano def. (Italy) Alessandro Giannessi 6–4, 6–1.

=== Doubles ===
- (Germany) Kevin Krawietz / (France) Albano Olivetti def. (Canada) Frank Dancevic / (Serbia) Marko Tepavac, 6–4, 6–4.
