= Alexander Erler =

Austrian tennis player (born 1997)

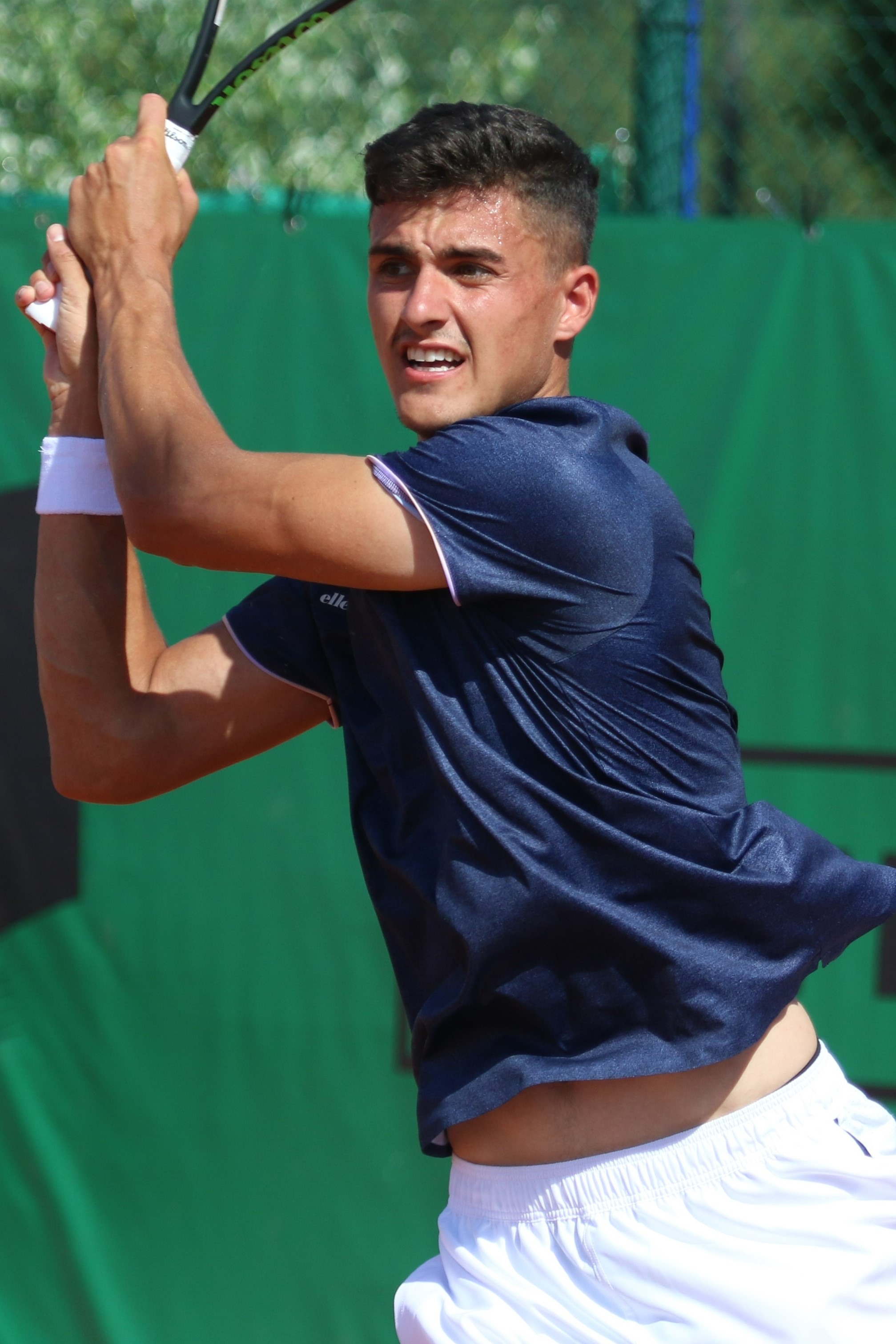
- Erler at the 2022 Internationaux de Tennis de Blois
- Country (sports): Austria
- Born: 27 October 1997 (age 28) Innsbruck, Austria
- Height: 1.93 m (6 ft 4 in)
- Turned pro: 2015
- Plays: Right-handed (two-handed backhand)
- Coach: Daniel Huber, Thomas Weindorfer
- Prize money: US $1,336,034

Singles
- Career record: 1–1
- Career titles: 0
- Highest ranking: No. 322 (4 October 2021)

Doubles
- Career record: 111–94
- Career titles: 9
- Highest ranking: No. 29 (13 April 2026)
- Current ranking: No. 29 (13 April 2026)

Grand Slam doubles results
- Australian Open: 2R (2023, 2026)
- French Open: 3R (2026)
- Wimbledon: 3R (2025)
- US Open: 2R (2024, 2025, 2026)
- Last updated on: 13 April 2026.

Alexander Erler (Austrian German: [alɛkˈsandɐ ˈɛrlɐ]; born 27 October 1997) is an Austrian professional tennis player who specializes in doubles. He has a career-high ATP doubles ranking of world No. 29 achieved on 13 April 2026 and a singles ranking of No. 322 on 4 October 2021.

Erler has won nine ATP Tour doubles titles, seven of them with compatriot Lucas Miedler.

Erler also earned ten doubles trophies on the ATP Challenger Tour, as well as multiple titles on the ITF Men's Tour.

== Professional career ==
=== 2015: ATP doubles debut ===
Erler made his ATP main draw debut at the 2015 Generali Open Kitzbühel in the doubles draw, partnering Philipp Kohlschreiber.

=== 2021: ATP singles debut and first match win, maiden doubles ATP title ===
At the 2021 Generali Open Kitzbühel, Erler won his first ATP match as a wildcard defeating future world no. 1 Carlos Alcaraz who was then ranked No. 55. At the same tournament, he won the doubles title partnering Lucas Miedler.

=== 2022: First ATP 500 doubles title, top 50 debut ===
The Austrian team of Erler/Miedler clinched their second and biggest title on home soil at the ATP 500 2022 Erste Bank Open without dropping a set. As a result, he made his top 50 debut in the doubles rankings on 31 October 2022.

=== 2023: Major and Masters debuts & first win, Second ATP 500 title, top 35 ===
At the 2023 Australian Open the pair Erler/Miedler made their Grand Slam debut where they defeated tenth seeds Rohan Bopanna and Matthew Ebden. At the ATP 500 Mexican Open Miedler won his third title with compatriot Erler defeating en route top seeds Wesley Koolhof and Neal Skupski. Erler made his Masters debut with Miedler at the 2023 Miami Open.

At the 2023 Grand Prix Hassan II the pair Erler/Miedler reached the final defeating fifth seeds Maxime Cressy and Albano Olivetti. They lost in the final to Andrea Vavassori and Marcelo Demoliner. They won their fourth title at the 2023 BMW Open in Munich, Germany. At the 2023 Generali Open Kitzbühel, they won their fifth doubles title.

=== 2024–2026: Four doubles titles ===
Partnering Andreas Mies, Erler won the doubles title at the 2024 Generali Open in Kitzbühel, defeating Constantin Frantzen and Hendrik Jebens in the final.

In October 2024, he won back-to-back doubles titles partnering Lucas Miedler, claiming the European Open in Antwerp followed by the Vienna Open.

Playing alongside Robert Galloway, Erler won the 2025 Stockholm Open, defeating Vasil Kirkov and Bart Stevens in the final. They were also runners-up at the 2026 Auckland Open and 2026 Mexican Open.

== Doubles performance timeline ==
Key
| W | F | SF | QF | #R | RR | Q# | DNQ | A | NH |

(W) winner; (F) finalist; (SF) semifinalist; (QF) quarterfinalist; (#R) rounds 4, 3, 2, 1; (RR) round-robin stage; (Q#) qualification round; (DNQ) did not qualify; (A) absent; (NH) not held; (SR) strike rate (events won / competed); (W–L) win–loss record.
To avoid confusion and double counting, these charts are updated at the conclusion of a tournament or when the player's participation has ended.

Current through the 2026 Mexican Open.

| Tournament | 2015 | 2016 | 2017 | 2018 | 2019 | 2020 | 2021 | 2022 | 2023 | 2024 | 2025 | SR | W–L |
|---|---|---|---|---|---|---|---|---|---|---|---|---|---|
Grand Slam tournaments
| Australian Open | A | A | A | A | A | A | A | A | 2R | 1R | 1R | 0 / 3 | 1–3 |
| French Open | A | A | A | A | A | A | A | A | 1R | 2R | 2R | 0 / 3 | 2–3 |
| Wimbledon | A | A | A | A | A | NH | A | A | 2R | 1R | 3R | 0 / 3 | 3–3 |
| US Open | A | A | A | A | A | A | A | A | 1R | 2R | | 0 / 2 | 1–2 |
| Win–loss | 0–0 | 0–0 | 0–0 | 0–0 | 0–0 | 0–0 | 0–0 | 0–0 | 2–4 | 2–4 | 3–3 | 0 / 11 | 7–11 |
National representation
| Davis Cup | A | A | A | A | A | A | A | G1 | G1 | G1 | Q1 | 0 / 0 | 6–1 |
ATP Masters 1000
| Indian Wells Open | A | A | A | A | A | NH | A | A | A | A | 1R | 0 / 1 | 0–1 |
| Miami Open | A | A | A | A | A | NH | A | A | 1R | 1R | 1R | 0 / 3 | 0–3 |
| Madrid Open | A | A | A | A | A | NH | A | A | 1R | A | 2R | 0 / 2 | 1–2 |
| Italian Open | A | A | A | A | A | A | A | A | 1R | A | A | 0 / 1 | 0–1 |
| Cincinnati Open | | | | | | | | | | | A | 0 / 0 | 0–0 |
| Shanghai Masters | A | A | A | A | A | not held | | | 2R | A | | 0 / 1 | 1–1 |
| Paris Masters | A | A | A | A | A | A | A | A | 2R | A | | 0 / 1 | 1–1 |
| Win–loss | 0–0 | 0–0 | 0–0 | 0–0 | 0–0 | 0–0 | 0–0 | 0–0 | 2–5 | 0–1 | 1–3 | 0 / 9 | 3–9 |
Career statistics
| Tournaments | 1 | 0 | 0 | 0 | 0 | 0 | 2 | 7 | 30 | 25 | 17 | 82 | |
| Titles | 0 | 0 | 0 | 0 | 0 | 0 | 1 | 1 | 3 | 3 | 0 | 8 | |
| Finals | 0 | 0 | 0 | 0 | 0 | 0 | 1 | 1 | 4 | 5 | 0 | 11 | |
| Overall win–loss | 0–1 | 0–0 | 0–0 | 0–0 | 0–0 | 0–0 | 4–1 | 8–7 | 33–27 | 29–22 | 12–16 | 86–74 | |
| Year-end ranking | 1217 | 1581 | 621 | – | 749 | 405 | 126 | 51 | 37 | 42 | | 54% | |

== ATP Tour finals ==
=== Doubles: 14 (9 titles, 5 runner ups) ===
| Legend Grand Slam (–) ATP 1000 (–) ATP 500 (3–2) ATP 250 (6–3) | Finals by surface Hard (5–2) Clay (4–3) Grass (–) | Finals by setting Outdoor (5–5) Indoor (4–0) |

| Result | W–L | Date | Tournament | Tier | Surface | Partner | Opponents | Score |
|---|---|---|---|---|---|---|---|---|
| Win | 1–0 | Jul 2021 | Austrian Open Kitzbühel, Austria | ATP 250 | Clay | (Austria) Lucas Miedler | (Czech Republic) Roman Jebavý (Netherlands) Matwé Middelkoop | 7–5, 7–6^{(7–5)} |
| Win | 2–0 | Oct 2022 | Vienna Open, Austria | ATP 500 | Hard (i) | (Austria) Lucas Miedler | (Mexico) Santiago González (Argentina) Andrés Molteni | 6–3, 7–6^{(7–1)} |
| Win | 3–0 | Mar 2023 | Mexican Open, Mexico | ATP 500 | Hard | (Austria) Lucas Miedler | (United States) Nathaniel Lammons (United States) Jackson Withrow | 7–6^{(11–9)}, 7–6^{(7–3)} |
| Loss | 3–1 | Apr 2023 | Grand Prix Hassan II, Morocco | ATP 250 | Clay | (Austria) Lucas Miedler | (Brazil) Marcelo Demoliner (Italy) Andrea Vavassori | 4–6, 6–3, [10–12] |
| Win | 4–1 | Apr 2023 | Bavarian Championships, Germany | ATP 250 | Clay | (Austria) Lucas Miedler | (Germany) Kevin Krawietz (Germany) Tim Pütz | 6–3, 6–4 |
| Win | 5–1 | Aug 2023 | Austrian Open Kitzbühel, Austria (2) | ATP 250 | Clay | (Austria) Lucas Miedler | (Ecuador) Gonzalo Escobar (Kazakhstan) Aleksandr Nedovyesov | 6–4, 6–4 |
| Loss | 5–2 | Feb 2024 | Rio Open, Brazil | ATP 500 | Clay | (Austria) Lucas Miedler | (Colombia) Nicolás Barrientos (Brazil) Rafael Matos | 4–6, 3–6 |
| Loss | 5–3 | Apr 2024 | Grand Prix Hassan II, Morocco | ATP 250 | Clay | (Austria) Lucas Miedler | (Finland) Harri Heliövaara (United Kingdom) Henry Patten | 6–3, 4–6, [4–10] |
| Win | 6–3 | Jul 2024 | Austrian Open Kitzbühel, Austria (3) | ATP 250 | Clay | (Germany) Andreas Mies | (Germany) Constantin Frantzen (Germany) Hendrik Jebens | 6–3, 3–6, [10–6] |
| Win | 7–3 | Oct 2024 | European Open, Belgium | ATP 250 | Hard (i) | (Austria) Lucas Miedler | (United States) Robert Galloway (Kazakhstan) Aleksandr Nedovyesov | 6–4, 1–6, [10–8] |
| Win | 8–3 | Oct 2024 | Vienna Open, Austria (2) | ATP 500 | Hard (i) | (Austria) Lucas Miedler | (United Kingdom) Neal Skupski (New Zealand) Michael Venus | 4–6, 6–3, [10–1] |
| Win | 9–3 | Oct 2025 | Stockholm Open, Sweden | ATP 250 | Hard (i) | (United States) Robert Galloway | (United States) Vasil Kirkov (Netherlands) Bart Stevens | 6–3, 6–2 |
| Loss | 9–4 | Jan 2026 | Auckland Open, New Zealand | ATP 250 | Hard | (United States) Robert Galloway | (France) Théo Arribagé (France) Albano Olivetti | 6–7^{(2–7)}, 4–6 |
| Loss | 9–5 | Feb 2026 | Mexican Open, Mexico | ATP 500 | Hard | (United States) Robert Galloway | (Brazil) Marcelo Melo (Germany) Alexander Zverev | 3–6, 4–6 |

== ATP Challenger Tour finals ==
=== Doubles: 15 (10 titles, 5 runner-ups) ===
| Legend ATP Challenger Tour (10–5) | Finals by surface Hard (6–4) Clay (4–1) |

| Result | W–L | Date | Tournament | Tier | Surface | Partner | Opponents | Score |
|---|---|---|---|---|---|---|---|---|
| Loss | 0–1 | Oct 2021 | Sibiu Open, Romania | Challenger | Clay | (Austria) Lucas Miedler | (United States) James Cerretani (Switzerland) Luca Margaroli | 3–6, 1–6 |
| Loss | 0–2 | Nov 2021 | Sparkassen Challenger, Italy | Challenger | Hard (i) | (Austria) Lucas Miedler | (Croatia) Antonio Šančić (Austria) Sam Weissborn | 6–7^{(8–10)}, 6–4, [8–10] |
| Win | 1–2 | Nov 2021 | Tali Open, Finland | Challenger | Hard (i) | (Austria) Lucas Miedler | (Finland) Harri Heliövaara (Netherlands) Jean-Julien Rojer | 6–3, 7–6^{(7–2)} |
| Win | 2–2 | Dec 2021 | Torneo Città di Forlì III, Italy | Challenger | Hard (i) | (Austria) Lucas Miedler | (Italy) Marco Bortolotti (Spain) Sergio Martos Gornés | 6-4, 6–2 |
| Win | 3–2 | Feb 2022 | Bengaluru Open II, India | Challenger | Hard | (India) Arjun Kadhe | (India) Saketh Myneni (India) Ramkumar Ramanathan | 6–3, 6–7^{(4–7)}, [10–7] |
| Win | 4–2 | Apr 2022 | Ostra Group Open, Czech Republic | Challenger | Clay | (Austria) Lucas Miedler | (United States) Hunter Reese (Netherlands) Sem Verbeek | 7–6^{(7–5)}, 7–5 |
| Loss | 4–3 | May 2022 | Tunis Open, Tunisia | Challenger | Clay | (Austria) Lucas Miedler | (Colombia) Nicolás Barrientos (Mexico) Miguel Ángel Reyes-Varela | 7–6^{(7–3)}, 3–6, [9–11] |
| Loss | 4–4 | Jul 2022 | Salzburg Open, Austria | Challenger | Clay | (Austria) Lucas Miedler | (United States) Nathaniel Lammons (United States) Jackson Withrow | 5–7, 7–5, [9–11] |
| Win | 5–4 | Jul 2022 | Tampere Open, Finland | Challenger | Clay | (Austria) Lucas Miedler | (Poland) Karol Drzewiecki (Finland) Patrik Niklas-Salminen | 7–6^{(7–3)}, 6–1 |
| Win | 6–4 | Aug 2022 | Città di Como Challenger, Italy | Challenger | Clay | (Austria) Lucas Miedler | (Jamaica) Dustin Brown (Germany) Julian Lenz | 6–1, 7–6^{(7–3)} |
| Win | 7–4 | Sep 2022 | NÖ Open, Austria | Challenger | Clay | (Austria) Lucas Miedler | (Czech Republic) Zdeněk Kolář (Ukraine) Denys Molchanov | 6–3, 6–4 |
| Loss | 7–5 | Sep 2022 | Sibiu Open, Romania | Challenger | Clay | (Austria) Lucas Miedler | (Serbia) Ivan Sabanov (Serbia) Matej Sabanov | 6–3, 5–7, [4–10] |
| Win | 8–5 | May 2023 | Sardegna Open, Italy | Challenger | Clay | (Austria) Lucas Miedler | (Argentina) Máximo González (Argentina) Andrés Molteni | 7–6^{(8–6)}, 6–3 |
| Win | 9–5 | Oct 2023 | Shenzhen Longhua Open, China | Challenger | Hard | (Austria) Lucas Miedler | (Poland) Piotr Matuszewski (Australia) Matthew Romios | 6–3, 6–4 |
| Win | 10–5 | Mar 2025 | Napoli Tennis Cup, Italy | Challenger | Clay | (Germany) Constantin Frantzen | (France) Geoffrey Blancaneaux (France) Albano Olivetti | 6–4, 6–4 |

== ITF Tour finals ==
=== Singles: 15 (7 titles, 8 runner-ups) ===
| Legend ITF Futures/WTT (7–8) | Finals by surface Hard (1–5) Clay (6–3) |

| Result | W–L | Date | Tournament | Tier | Surface | Opponent | Score |
|---|---|---|---|---|---|---|---|
| Win | 1–0 | Sep 2018 | Egypt F18, Cairo | Futures | Clay | (Italy) Simone Roncalli | 6–2, 7–5 |
| Win | 2–0 | Sep 2018 | Egypt F19, Cairo | Futures | Clay | (Brazil) Jordan Correia | 6–3, 6–1 |
| Win | 3–0 | Sep 2018 | Egypt F20, Cairo | Futures | Clay | (Italy) Dante Gennaro | 6–4, 6–1 |
| Loss | 3–1 | Oct 2018 | Egypt F24, Cairo | Futures | Hard | (Egypt) Karim-Mohamed Maamoun | 6–4, 1–6, 4–6 |
| Loss | 3–2 | Jul 2019 | M15 Telfs, Austria | WTT | Clay | (Switzerland) Sandro Ehrat | 4–6, 7–6^{(8–6)}, 3–6 |
| Win | 4–2 | Jul 2019 | M15 Wels, Austria | WTT | Clay | (Croatia) Duje Kekez | 6–4, 6–4 |
| Loss | 4–3 | Sep 2019 | M25 Trieste, Italy | WTT | Clay | (Peru) Juan Pablo Varillas | 7–6^{(8–6)}, 1–6, 4–6 |
| Win | 5–3 | Nov 2019 | M15 Heraklion, Greece | WTT | Hard | (Poland) Jan Zieliński | 7–5, 6–1 |
| Loss | 5–4 | Mar 2020 | M25 Trento, Italy | WTT | Hard | (Belgium) Ruben Bemelmans | 6–4, 2–6, 4–6 |
| Loss | 5–5 | Dec 2020 | M15 Monastir, Tunisia | WTT | Hard | (Italy) Omar Giacalone | 3–6, 5–7 |
| Loss | 5–6 | Jan 2021 | M15 Monastir, Tunisia | WTT | Hard | (Japan) Kaichi Uchida | 4–6, 2–6 |
| Loss | 5–7 | Feb 2021 | M15 Monastir, Tunisia | WTT | Hard | (Belgium) Gauthier Onclin | 1–6, 4–6 |
| Win | 6–7 | Apr 2021 | M25 Meerbusch, Germany | WTT | Clay | (France) Arthur Cazaux | 6–2, 4–6, 7–5 |
| Win | 7–7 | May 2021 | M15 Antalya, Turkey | WTT | Clay | (Bulgaria) Adrian Andreev | 6–4, 6–1 |
| Loss | 7–8 | May 2021 | M15 Antalya, Turkey | WTT | Clay | (Dominican Republic) Nick Hardt | 0–6, 6–7^{(7–9)} |

=== Doubles: 26 (18 titles, 8 runner-ups) ===
| Legend ITF Futures/WTT (18–8) | Finals by surface Hard (14–4) Clay (3–3) Carpet (1–1) |

| Result | W–L | Date | Tournament | Tier | Surface | Partner | Opponents | Score |
|---|---|---|---|---|---|---|---|---|
| Win | 1–0 | Nov 2015 | Germany F18, Ismaning | Futures | Carpet (i) | (Germany) Constantin Frantzen | (Germany) Kevin Krawietz (Germany) Tim Sandkaulen | 2–6, 7–6^{(7–5)}, [10–8] |
| Win | 2–0 | Feb 2017 | Turkey F4, Antalya | Futures | Hard | (Austria) Sebastian Ofner | (Ukraine) Volodymyr Uzhylovskyi (Russia) Anton Zaitcev | 6–2, 3–6, [10–7] |
| Win | 3–0 | Aug 2017 | Austria F6, Innsbruck | Futures | Clay | (Austria) Matthias Haim | (Austria) Bernd Kossler (Germany) Lukas Ollert | 6–4, 7–6^{(7–3)} |
| Loss | 3–1 | Sep 2017 | Turkey F35, Antalya | Futures | Clay | (Czech Republic) Vít Kopřiva | (Germany) Johann Willem (Netherlands) Michiel De Krom | 7–6^{(7–0)}, 2–6, [9–11] |
| Loss | 3–2 | Mar 2018 | Egypt F9, Sharm El Sheikh | Futures | Hard | (Czech Republic) Jaroslav Pospíšil | (Guatemala) Wilfredo González (Zimbabwe) Benjamin Lock | 3–6, 4–6 |
| Loss | 3–3 | Jul 2018 | Austria F1, Telfs | Futures | Clay | (Russia) Kirill Kivattsev | (Spain) Mario Vilella Martínez (Italy) Marco Bortolotti | 1–6, 6–3, [4–11] |
| Win | 4–3 | Aug 2018 | Austria F6, Innsbruck | Futures | Clay | (Austria) Jakob Aichhorn | (Argentina) Alejo Vilaro (Argentina) Mariano Kestelboim | 6–1, 1–6, [11–9] |
| Win | 5–3 | Sep 2018 | Egypt F18, Cairo | Futures | Hard | (Russia) Markos Kalovelonis | (India) Aryan Goveas (India) Anirudh Chandrasekar | 6–4, 7–6^{(3–7)} |
| Loss | 5–4 | Dec 2018 | Tunisia F44, Monastir | Futures | Hard | (Germany) Christian Hirschmueller | (Tunisia) Aziz Dougaz (Portugal) Fred Gil | 1–6, 3–6 |
| Win | 6–4 | Mar 2019 | M25 Trento, Italy | WTT | Hard | (Russia) Markos Kalovelonis | (United States) Felix Corwin (United States) Danny Thomas | 6–3, 6–4 |
| Win | 7–4 | Nov 2019 | M15 Heraklion, Greece | WTT | Hard | (Austria) Neil Oberleitner | (United Kingdom) Luke Johnson (Poland) Jan Zieliński | 6–4, 6–0 |
| Win | 8–4 | Feb 2020 | M15 Heraklion, Greece | WTT | Hard | (Austria) David Pichler | (Germany) Valentin Guenther (Germany) Kai Wehnelt | 3–6, 6–4, [10–4] |
| Loss | 8–5 | Mar 2020 | M25 Trento, Italy | WTT | Hard | (Spain) David Jordà Sanchis | (Belgium) Ruben Bemelmans (Germany) Daniel Masur | 6–7^{(7–9)}, 2–6 |
| Win | 9–5 | Mar 2020 | M15 Heraklion, Greece | WTT | Hard | (Russia) Bogdan Bobrov | (France) Antoine Cornut-Chauvinc (Germany) Constantin Schmitz | 2–6, 7–6^{(7–4)}, [12–10] |
| Win | 10–5 | Sep 2020 | M15 Caslano, Switzerland | WTT | Clay | (Austria) David Pichler | (France) Antoine Cornut-Chauvinc (France) Harold Mayot | 7–5, 6–4 |
| Win | 11–5 | Sep 2020 | M15 Monastir, Tunisia | WTT | Hard | (Austria) David Pichler | (Argentina) Fermín Tenti (Argentina) Ignacio Monzón | 6–4, 6–1 |
| Loss | 11–6 | Dec 2020 | M15 Monastir, Tunisia | WTT | Hard | (Austria) David Pichler | (France) Théo Arribagé (France) Titouan Droguet | 6–4, 6–7^{(5–7)}, [6–10] |
| Win | 12–6 | Dec 2020 | M15 Monastir, Tunisia | WTT | Hard | (Austria) David Pichler | (Tunisia) Skander Mansouri (Germany) Mats Rosenkranz | 6–2, 7–6^{(14–12)} |
| Win | 13–6 | Dec 2020 | M15 Monastir, Tunisia | WTT | Hard | (Austria) David Pichler | (Tunisia) Skander Mansouri (France) Dan Added | 7–6^{(9–7)}, 6–3 |
| Win | 14–6 | Dec 2020 | M15 Monastir, Tunisia | WTT | Hard | (Austria) David Pichler | (United States) Alexander Kotzen (France) Constant De La Bassetiere | 6–2, 6–2 |
| Win | 15–6 | Jan 2021 | M15 Monastir, Tunisia | WTT | Hard | (Austria) David Pichler | (France) Benjamin Pietri (France) Théo Arribagé | 6–4, 7–6^{(7–5)} |
| Win | 16–6 | Feb 2021 | M15 Monastir, Tunisia | WTT | Hard | (Tunisia) Skander Mansouri | (Japan) Naoki Nakagawa (Japan) Ryota Tanuma | 6–0, 7–5 |
| Win | 17–6 | Feb 2021 | M15 Monastir, Tunisia | WTT | Hard | (Tunisia) Skander Mansouri | (France) Lilian Marmousez (France) Giovanni Mpetshi Perricard | 6–2, 5–7, [11–9] |
| Loss | 17–7 | Mar 2021 | M25 Trimbach, Switzerland | WTT | Carpet (i) | (Germany) Elmar Ejupovic | (Switzerland) Jakub Paul (Switzerland) Yannik Steinegger | 3–6, 5–7 |
| Win | 18–7 | Apr 2021 | M25 Biel, Switzerland | WTT | Hard | (Austria) Maximilian Neuchrist | (France) Lilian Marmousez (France) Giovanni Mpetshi Perricard | 6–3, 4–6, [10–2] |
| Loss | 18–8 | May 2021 | M15 Antalya, Turkey | WTT | Clay | (Switzerland) Sandro Ehrat | (Brazil) Orlando Luz (Brazil) Gabriel Roveri Sidney | 2–6, 6–7^{(2–7)} |
