= 2022 Sparkassen ATP Challenger =

- Date: 24–30 October
- Edition: 13th
- Surface: Hard (indoor)
- Location: Ortisei, Italy

Champions

Singles
- (Croatia) Borna Gojo

Doubles
- (Uzbekistan) Denis Istomin / Evgeny Karlovskiy
- Sparkassen ATP Challenger

The 2022 Sparkassen ATP Challenger was a professional tennis tournament played on indoor hard courts in Ortisei, Italy between 24 and 30 October 2022. It was the 13th edition of the tournament and was part of the 2022 ATP Challenger Tour.

== Singles main-draw entrants ==
=== Seeds ===
Country	Player	Rank^{1}	Seed
CZE	Tomáš Macháč	112	1
CHI	Nicolás Jarry	118	2
GER	Yannick Hanfmann	155	3
ITA	Giulio Zeppieri	166	4
ITA	Flavio Cobolli	167	5
SVK	Lukáš Klein	170	6
HUN	Fábián Marozsán	174	7
GER	Daniel Masur	179	8

- ^{1} Rankings are as of 17 October 2022.

=== Other entrants ===
The following players received wildcards into the singles main draw:

- (Italy) Federico Arnaboldi
- (Italy) Luca Nardi
- (Italy) Stefano Travaglia

The following players received entry into the singles main draw as alternates:

- (Bosnia and Herzegovina) Mirza Bašić
- (Italy) Mattia Bellucci
- (Italy) Lorenzo Giustino

The following players received entry from the qualifying draw:

- (France) Térence Atmane
- Alibek Kachmazov
- Evgeny Karlovskiy
- (Austria) Sandro Kopp
- (Czech Republic) Petr Nouza
- (Czech Republic) Andrew Paulson

The following player received entry as a lucky loser:

- (Romania) Marius Copil

== Champions ==
=== Singles ===
- (Croatia) Borna Gojo def. (Slovakia) Lukáš Klein 7–6^{(7–4)}, 6–3.

=== Doubles ===
- (Uzbekistan) Denis Istomin / Evgeny Karlovskiy def. (Italy) Marco Bortolotti / (Spain) Sergio Martos Gornés 6–3, 7–5.
