= Antonio Šančić =

Croatian tennis player (born 1988)

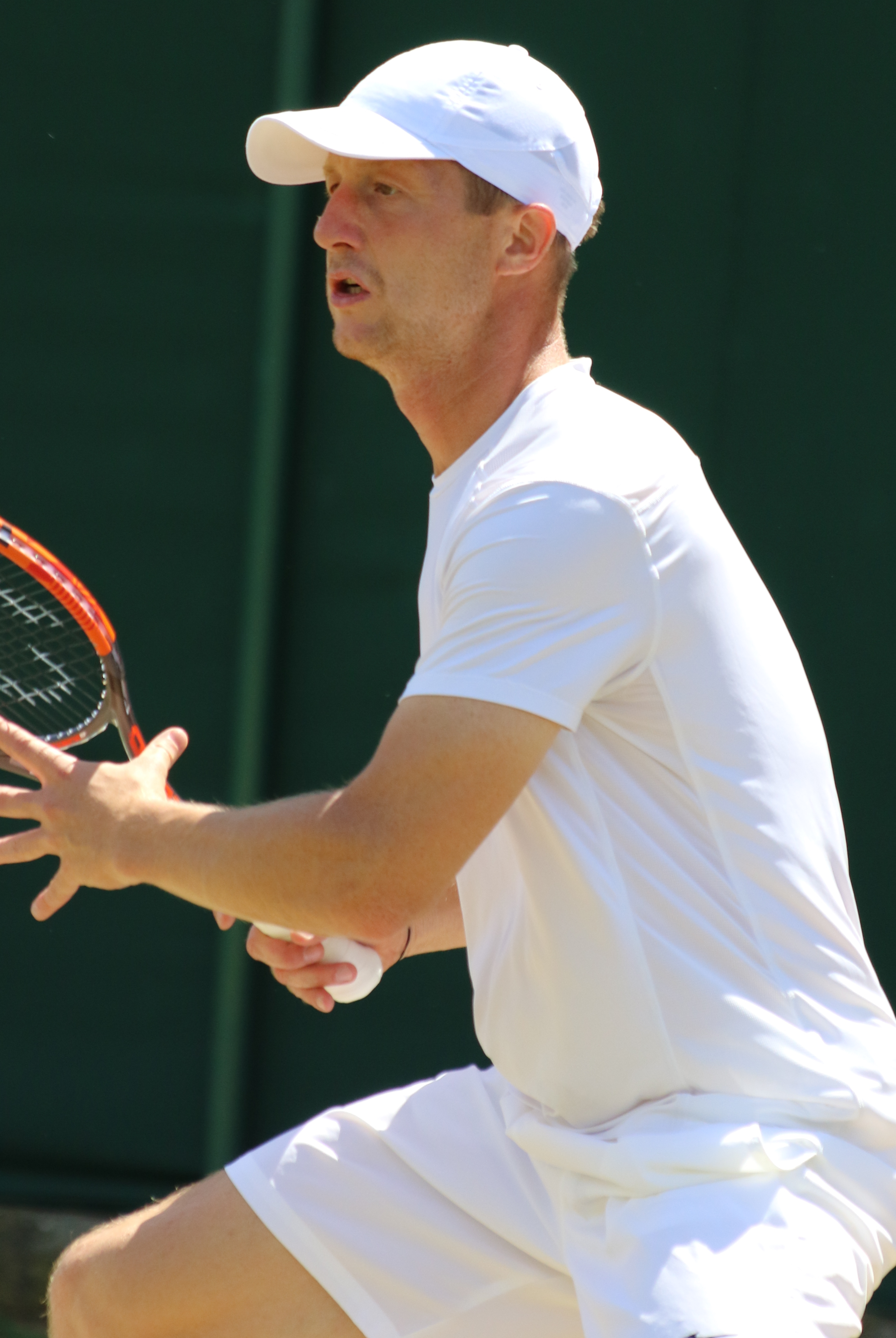
- Šančić at the 2017 Wimbledon Championships
- Country (sports): Croatia
- Born: 23 November 1988 (age 37) Brežice, Slovenia
- Height: 1.83 m (6 ft 0 in)
- Retired: 2022 (last match played)
- Plays: Right handed (double handed backhand)
- Prize money: US$277,711

Singles
- Career record: 0–0 (ATP Tour level, Grand Slam level, and Davis Cup)
- Career titles: 0
- Highest ranking: No. 362 (17 August 2009)

Doubles
- Career record: 23–35 (ATP Tour level, Grand Slam level, and Davis Cup)
- Career titles: 0
- Highest ranking: No. 60 (23 April 2018)

Grand Slam doubles results
- French Open: 1R (2018)
- Wimbledon: 3R (2017)
- US Open: 1R (2018)
- Last updated on: 9 April 2023.

Antonio Šančić (born 23 November 1988) is a Slovenia-born former professional Croatian tennis player and coach. He played mostly on the ATP Challenger Tour.

== ATP career finals ==
=== Doubles: 3 (3 runner-ups) ===
Legend Grand Slam tournaments (0–0) ATP World Tour Finals (0–0) ATP World Tour Masters 1000 (0–0) ATP World Tour 500 Series (0–0) ATP World Tour 250 Series (0–3)	Titles by surface Hard (0–1) Clay (0–2) Grass (0–0)	Titles by setting Outdoor (0–2) Indoor (0–1)

Result	W–L	Date	Tournament	Tier	Surface	Partner	Opponents	Score
Loss	0–1	Jul 2016	Croatia Open, Croatia	250 Series	Clay	(Croatia) Nikola Mektić	(Slovakia) Martin Kližan (Spain) David Marrero	4–6, 2–6
Loss	0–2	Oct 2017	Kremlin Cup, Russia	250 Series	Hard (i)	(Bosnia and Herzegovina) Damir Džumhur	(Belarus) Max Mirnyi (Austria) Philipp Oswald	3–6, 5–7
Loss	0–3	Apr 2018	US Clay Court Championships, United States	250 Series	Clay	(Germany) Andre Begemann	(Belarus) Max Mirnyi (Austria) Philipp Oswald	7–6^{(7–2)}, 4–6, [9–11]

== Challenger and Futures Finals ==
=== Singles: 4 (2–2) ===
Legend (singles) ATP Challenger Tour (0–0) ITF Futures Tour (2–2)	Titles by surface Hard (0–1) Clay (2–1) Grass (0–0) Carpet (0–0)

Result	W–L	Date	Tournament	Tier	Surface	Opponent	Score
Win	1–0	Sep 2008	Croatia F8, Zagreb	Futures	Clay	(Croatia) Ivan Cerović	6–2, 6–3
Win	2–0	Oct 2008	Spain F40, Sant Cugat	Futures	Clay	(Spain) Íñigo Cervantes Huegun	7–6^{(7–5)}, 6–3
Loss	2–1	Mar 2009	Croatia F2, Zagreb	Futures	Hard (i)	(Slovakia) Lukáš Lacko	2–6, 6–4, 5–7
Loss	2–2	Aug 2014	Serbia F8, Novi Sad	Futures	Clay	(Australia) Gavin van Peperzeel	0–6, 6–7^{(2–7)}

=== Doubles: 65 (30 titles, 35 runner-ups) ===
Legend (doubles) ATP Challenger Tour (18–25) ITF (12–10)	Titles by surface Hard (8–17) Clay (20–18) Grass (0–0) Carpet (2–0)

Result	W–L	Date	Tournament	Tier	Surface	Partner	Opponents	Score
Loss	0–1	Jun 2007	Slovenia F1, Krško	Futures	Clay	(Croatia) Kristijan Mesaroš	(Slovenia) Luka Ocvirk (Slovenia) Aleš Švigelj	5–7, 2–6
Win	1–1	Feb 2008	Austria F2, Bergheim	Futures	Carpet (i)	(Croatia) Vilim Višak	(Germany) Peter Gojowczyk (Germany) Marc Sieber	6–7^{(5–7)}, 6–1, [10–8]
Win	2–1	Aug 2008	Serbia F3, Novi Sad	Futures	Clay	(Croatia) Vilim Višak	(Hungary) Olivier Borsos (Hungary) Bence Gyula Tóth	6–2, 6–3
Win	3–1	Aug 2008	Serbia F4, Sombor	Futures	Clay	(Croatia) Vilim Višak	(Serbia) Aleksander Slović (Montenegro) Goran Tošić	6–4, 7–5
Win	4–1	Aug 2008	Croatia F7, Čakovec	Futures	Clay	(Croatia) Vilim Višak	(Italy) Filippo Leonardi (Italy) Giulio Torroni	6–0, 6–4
Win	5–1	Sep 2008	Croatia F8, Zagreb	Futures	Clay	(Croatia) Roman Kelečić	(Croatia) Luka Kukulić (Croatia) Tomislav Tucibat	6–3, 6–2
Loss	5–2	Oct 2009	Croatia F9, Dubrovnik	Futures	Clay	(United Kingdom) Morgan Phillips	(Slovenia) Martin Rmuš (Slovenia) Blaž Rola	3–6, 6–7^{(7–9)}
Win	6–2	Aug 2011	Serbia F6, Subotica	Futures	Clay	(Croatia) Dino Marcan	(Hungary) Ádám Kellner (Hungary) Dénes Lukács	6–4, 4–6, [10–7]
Win	7–2	Sep 2013	Croatia F9, Osijek	Futures	Clay	(Croatia) Duje Delić	(Croatia) Tomislav Draganja (Croatia) Antun Vidak	7–6^{(7–5)}, 7–5
Win	8–2	Nov 2013	Croatia F13, Umag	Futures	Clay	(Slovenia) Janez Semrajc	(Croatia) Toni Androić (Croatia) Tomislav Draganja	3–6, 6–3, [10–5]
Win	9–2	Nov 2013	Croatia F14, Umag	Futures	Clay	(Croatia) Dino Marcan	(Croatia) Ivan Sabanov (Croatia) Matej Sabanov	6–0, 5–7, [10–2]
Loss	9–3	Dec 2013	Croatia F14, Bol	Futures	Clay	(Bosnia and Herzegovina) Tomislav Brkić	(Serbia) Nikola Ćirić (Serbia) Goran Tošić	w/o
Loss	9–4	Feb 2014	Croatia F1, Zagreb	Futures	Hard (i)	(Croatia) Dino Marcan	(Bosnia and Herzegovina) Tomislav Brkić (Slovenia) Janez Semrajc	6–7^{(3–7)}, 6–7^{(7–9)}
Loss	9–5	Mar 2014	Croatia F5, Umag	Futures	Clay	(Croatia) Dino Marcan	(Belarus) Egor Gerasimov (Belarus) Dzmitry Zhyrmont	4–6, 6–4, [6–10]
Win	10–5	Apr 2014	Croatia F5, Rovinj	Futures	Clay	(Croatia) Dino Marcan	(Croatia) Tomislav Draganja (Croatia) Joško Topić	7–6^{(7–5)}, 7–5
Loss	10–6	Aug 2014	Serbia F8, Novi Sad	Futures	Clay	(Croatia) Dino Marcan	(Montenegro) Ljubomir Čelebić (Italy) Davide Melchiorre	4–6, 6–4, [5–10]
Loss	10–7	Aug 2014	Croatia F14, Čakovec	Futures	Clay	(Croatia) Tomislav Draganja	(Czech Republic) Jan Kunčík (Czech Republic) Dominik Süč	6–3, 3–6, [8–10]
Loss	10–8	Aug 2014	Croatia F15, Osijek	Futures	Clay	(Croatia) Tomislav Draganja	(Czech Republic) Libor Salaba (Czech Republic) Jan Šátral	6–7^{(4–7)}, 4–6
Win	11–8	Sep 2014	Banja Luka, Bosnia/Herzegovina	Challenger	Clay	(Croatia) Dino Marcan	(Czech Republic) Jaroslav Pospíšil (Slovakia) Adrian Sikora	7–5, 6–4
Win	12–8	Sep 2014	Kenitra, Morocco	Challenger	Clay	(Croatia) Dino Marcan	(Spain) Gerard Granollers Pujol (Spain) Jordi Samper Montaña	6–1, 7–6^{(7–3)}
Loss	12–9	Mar 2015	Croatia F3, Umag	Futures	Clay	(Croatia) Tomislav Draganja	(Italy) Marco Bortolotti (Spain) Juan Lizariturry	3–6, 6–7^{(6–8)}
Win	13–9	Mar 2015	Croatia F6, Rovinj	Futures	Clay	(Croatia) Dino Marcan	(Italy) Federico Gaio (Italy) Matteo Trevisan	6–3, 7–5
Loss	13–10	May 2015	Turin, Italy	Challenger	Clay	(Croatia) Dino Marcan	(Netherlands) Wesley Koolhof (Netherlands) Matwé Middelkoop	6–3, 3–6, [5–10]
Win	14–10	Jun 2015	Milan, Italy	Challenger	Clay	(Croatia) Nikola Mektić	(Chile) Cristian Garín (Chile) Juan Carlos Sáez	6–3, 6–4
Win	15–10	Jul 2015	San Benedetto, Italy	Challenger	Clay	(Croatia) Dino Marcan	(Mexico) Miguel Ángel Reyes-Varela (Mexico) César Ramírez	6–3, 6–7^{(10–12)}, [12–10]
Loss	15–11	Aug 2015	Cordenons, Italy	Challenger	Clay	(Croatia) Dino Marcan	(Slovakia) Andrej Martin (Slovakia) Igor Zelenay	4–6, 7–5, [8–10]
Win	16–11	Oct 2015	Rennes, France	Challenger	Hard (i)	(Italy) Andrea Arnaboldi	(Netherlands) Wesley Koolhof (Netherlands) Matwé Middelkoop	6–4, 2–6, [14–12]
Loss	16–12	Nov 2015	Ortisei, Italy	Challenger	Hard (i)	(Croatia) Nikola Mektić	(Austria) Maximilian Neuchrist (Austria) Tristan-Samuel Weissborn	6–7^{(7–9)}, 3–6
Loss	16–13	Feb 2016	Bergamo, Italy	Challenger	Hard (i)	(Croatia) Nikola Mektić	(United Kingdom) Ken Skupski (United Kingdom) Neal Skupski	3–6, 5–7
Loss	16–14	Feb 2016	Wrocław, Poland	Challenger	Hard (i)	(Croatia) Nikola Mektić	(France) Pierre-Hugues Herbert (France) Albano Olivetti	3–6, 6–7^{(4–7)}
Loss	16–15	Mar 2016	Quimper, France	Challenger	Hard (i)	(Croatia) Nikola Mektić	(France) Tristan Lamasine (France) Albano Olivetti	2–6, 6–4, [7–10]
Loss	16–16	May 2016	Heilbronn, Germany	Challenger	Clay	(Croatia) Nikola Mektić	(Netherlands) Sander Arends (Austria) Tristan-Samuel Weissborn	3–6, 4–6
Loss	16–17	Jul 2016	Braunschweig, Germany	Challenger	Clay	(Poland) Mateusz Kowalczyk	(United States) James Cerretani (Austria) Philipp Oswald	6–4, 6–7^{(5–7)}, [2–10]
Win	17–17	Aug 2016	Manerbio, Italy	Challenger	Clay	(Croatia) Nikola Mektić	(Argentina) Juan Ignacio Galarza (Argentina) Leonardo Mayer	7–5, 6–1
Win	18–17	Oct 2016	Mohammedia, Morocco	Challenger	Clay	(Croatia) Dino Marcan	(Czech Republic) Roman Jebavý (Slovakia) Andrej Martin	7–6^{(7–3)}, 6–4
Loss	18–18	Oct 2016	Casablanca, Morocco	Challenger	Clay	(Croatia) Dino Marcan	(Czech Republic) Roman Jebavý (Slovakia) Andrej Martin	4–6, 2–6
Win	19–18	May 2017	Heilbronn, Germany	Challenger	Clay	(Czech Republic) Roman Jebavý	(Canada) Adil Shamasdin (Slovakia) Igor Zelenay	6–4, 6–1
Loss	19–19	Aug 2017	Meerbusch, Germany	Challenger	Clay	(Germany) Dustin Brown	(Germany) Kevin Krawietz (Germany) Andreas Mies	1–6, 6–7^{(5–7)}
Win	20–19	Sep 2017	Como, Italy	Challenger	Clay	(Netherlands) Sander Arends	(Belarus) Aliaksandr Bury (Germany) Kevin Krawietz	7–6^{(7–1)}, 6–2
Win	21–19	Oct 2017	Ortisei, Italy	Challenger	Hard (i)	(Netherlands) Sander Arends	(Germany) Jeremy Jahn (Israel) Edan Leshem	6–2, 5–7, [13–11]
Win	22–19	Oct 2017	Brest, France	Challenger	Hard (i)	(Netherlands) Sander Arends	(United Kingdom) Scott Clayton (India) Divij Sharan	6–4, 7–5
Loss	22–20	Nov 2017	Bratislava, Slovakia	Challenger	Hard (i)	(Netherlands) Sander Arends	(United Kingdom) Ken Skupski (United Kingdom) Neal Skupski	7–5, 3–6, [8–10]
Loss	22–21	Jan 2018	Koblenz, Germany	Challenger	Hard (i)	(Netherlands) Sander Arends	(Monaco) Romain Arneodo (Austria) Tristan-Samuel Weissborn	7–6^{(7–4)}, 5–7, [6–10]
Loss	22–22	Jan 2018	Rennes, France	Challenger	Hard (i)	(Netherlands) Sander Arends	(Belgium) Sander Gillé (Belgium) Joran Vliegen	3–6, 7–6^{(7–1)}, [7–10]
Loss	22–23	Feb 2018	Cherbourg, France	Challenger	Hard (i)	(United Kingdom) Ken Skupski	(Monaco) Romain Arneodo (Austria) Tristan-Samuel Weissborn	3–6, 6–1, [4–10]
Loss	22–24	Oct 2018	Ortisei, Italy	Challenger	Hard (i)	(India) Purav Raja	(Belgium) Sander Gillé (Belgium) Joran Vliegen	6–3, 3–6, [3–10]
Win	23–24	Oct 2018	Ismaning, Germany	Challenger	Carpet (i)	(India) Purav Raja	(Australia) Rameez Junaid (Netherlands) David Pel	5–7, 6–4, [10–5]
Loss	23–25	Nov 2018	Bangalore, India	Challenger	Hard	(India) Purav Raja	(Australia) Max Purcell (Australia) Luke Saville	6–7^{(3–7)}, 3–6
Loss	23–26	Jan 2019	Rennes, France	Challenger	Hard (i)	(Netherlands) David Pel	(Netherlands) Sander Arends (Austria) Tristan-Samuel Weissborn	4–6, 4–6
Loss	23–27	Feb 2019	Quimper, France	Challenger	Hard (i)	(Netherlands) David Pel	(France) Fabrice Martin (France) Hugo Nys	4–6, 2–6
Loss	23–28	Mar 2019	Saint Brieuc, France	Challenger	Hard (i)	(France) Jonathan Eysseric	(Israel) Jonathan Erlich (France) Fabrice Martin	6–7^{(2–7)}, 6–7^{(2–7)}
Loss	23–29	July 2019	Braunschweig, Germany	Challenger	Clay	(United States) Nathaniel Lammons	(Argentina) Guillermo Durán (Italy) Simone Bolelli	3–6, 2–6
Loss	23–30	Aug 2019	Liberec, Czech Republic	Challenger	Clay	(Serbia) Nikola Ćaćić	(Czech Republic) Michael Vrbenský (Czech Republic) Jonáš Forejtek	4–6, 3–6
Loss	23–31	Aug 2019	Cordenons, Italy	Challenger	Clay	(Serbia) Nikola Ćaćić	(Bosnia and Herzegovina) Tomislav Brkić (Croatia) Ante Pavić	2–6, 3–6
Win	24–31	Nov 2019	Ortisei, Italy	Challenger	Hard (i)	(Serbia) Nikola Ćaćić	(Netherlands) Sander Arends (Netherlands) David Pel	6–7^{(5–7)}, 7–6^{(7–3)}, [10–7]
Win	25–31	Jan 2020	Rennes, France	Challenger	Hard (i)	(Austria) Tristan-Samuel Weissborn	(Russia) Teymuraz Gabashvili (Slovakia) Lukáš Lacko	7–5, 6–7^{(5–7)}, [10–7]
Loss	25-32	Jan 2020	Newport Beach, United States	Challenger	Hard	(Austria) Tristan-Samuel Weissborn	(Ecuador) Gonzalo Escobar (Uruguay) Ariel Behar	2-6, 4–6
Win	26–32	Sep 2021	Saint-Tropez, France	Challenger	Hard	(New Zealand) Artem Sitak	(France) Manuel Guinard (Monaco) Romain Arneodo	7–6^{(7–5)}, 6–4
Win	27–32	Sep 2021	Banja Luka, Bosnia and Herzegovina	Challenger	Clay	(Croatia) Nino Serdarušić	(Croatia) Ivan Sabanov (Croatia) Matej Sabanov	6-3, 6–3
Loss	27–33	Sep 2021	Istanbul, Turkey	Challenger	Hard	(New Zealand) Artem Sitak	(Moldova) Radu Albot (Moldova) Alexander Cozbinov	6–4, 5–7, [9–11]
Win	28–33	Nov 2021	Ortisei, Italy	Challenger	Hard (i)	(Austria) Tristan-Samuel Weissborn	(Austria) Alexander Erler (Austria) Lucas Miedler	7–6^{(10–8)}, 4–6, [10–8]
Win	29–33	Dec 2021	Forli, Italy	Challenger	Hard (i)	(Austria) Tristan-Samuel Weissborn	(Czech Republic) Lukáš Rosol (Ukraine) Vitaliy Sachko	7–6^{(7–4)}, 4–6, [10–7]
Loss	29–34	Feb 2022	Forlì, Italy	Challenger	Hard (i)	(Slovakia) Igor Zelenay	(Romania) Victor Vlad Cornea (Germany) Fabian Fallert	4–6, 6–3, [2–10]
Win	30–34	Jul 2022	M15 Metzingen, Germany	ITF	Clay	(Croatia) Admir Kalender	(Slovakia) Lukáš Pokorný (United States) Alfredo Perez	7–6^{(7–5)}, 6–3
Loss	30–35	Sep 2022	M25 Maribor, Slovenia	ITF	Clay	(Croatia) Mili Poljičak	(Croatia) Domagoj Bilješko; Kirill Kivattsev	3-6, 7–6^{(7–0)}, [9–11]
