= Sparkassen ATP Challenger =

Internazionali Tennis Val Gardena

Tournament information
- Event name: Internazionali Tennis Val Gardena Alto Adige/Südtirol (ATP/WTA in 2023), Sparkasse Challenger Val Gardena Südtirol (ATP 2010-2022)
- Location: Ortisei, Italy
- Venue: Tennis Center Ortisei, ASV Tennis Club Urtijëi
- Surface: Hard (Indoor)
- Website: tennis-valgardena.com
ATP Tour
- Category: ATP Challenger Tour
- Draw: 32S / 32Q / 16D
- Prize money: €36,000 (2023), 64,000+H
WTA Tour
- Category: ITF Women's Circuit
- Draw: 32S / 32Q / 16D
- Prize money: $40,000 (2025)

The Internazionali Tennis Val Gardena (known as the Sparkasse Val Gardena Südtirol), is a tennis tournament held in Ortisei, Italy since 1999. It is currently part of the ITF Women's Circuit and is played on indoor hardcourts. The event was previously a $100,000+H ITF Women's Circuit category from 2008 to 2009. The event was also part of the ATP Challenger Tour from 2010 until 2023.

== Past finals ==
=== Men's singles ===
Year	Champion	Runner-up	Score
2023	(Slovakia) Lukáš Klein	(Poland) Maks Kaśnikowski	6–7^{(4–7)}, 7–6^{(7–4)}, 7–6^{(8–6)}
2022	(Croatia) Borna Gojo	(Slovakia) Lukáš Klein	7–6^{(7–4)}, 6–3
2021	(Germany) Oscar Otte	(United States) Maxime Cressy	7–6^{(7–5)}, 6–4
2020	(Belarus) Ilya Ivashka	(France) Antoine Hoang	6–4, 3–6, 7–6^{(7–3)}
2019	(Italy) Jannik Sinner	(Austria) Sebastian Ofner	6–2, 6–4
2018	(France) Ugo Humbert	(France) Pierre-Hugues Herbert	6–4, 6–2
2017	(Italy) Lorenzo Sonego	(Germany) Tim Pütz	6–4, 6–4
2016	(Italy) Stefano Napolitano	(Italy) Alessandro Giannessi	6–4, 6–1
2015	(Lithuania) Ričardas Berankis	(United States) Rajeev Ram	7–6^{(7–3)}, 6–4
2014	(Italy) Andreas Seppi	(Germany) Matthias Bachinger	6–4, 6–3
2013	(Italy) Andreas Seppi	(Germany) Simon Greul	7–6^{(7–4)}, 6–2
2012	(Germany) Benjamin Becker	(Italy) Andreas Seppi	6–1, 6–4
2011	(United States) Rajeev Ram	(Czech Republic) Jan Hernych	7–5, 3–6, 7–6^{(8–6)}
2010	(Poland) Michał Przysiężny	(Slovakia) Lukáš Lacko	6–3, 7–5

=== Men's doubles ===
Year	Champions	Runners-up	Score
2023	(Czech Republic) Andrew Paulson (Czech Republic) Patrik Rikl	(Austria) Maximilian Neuchrist (Switzerland) Jakub Paul	4–6, 7–6^{(9–7)}, [11–9]
2022	(Uzbekistan) Denis Istomin; Evgeny Karlovskiy	(Italy) Marco Bortolotti (Spain) Sergio Martos Gornés	6–3, 7–5
2021	(Croatia) Antonio Šančić (Austria) Tristan-Samuel Weissborn	(Austria) Alexander Erler (Austria) Lucas Miedler	7–6^{(10–8)}, 4–6, [10–8]
2020	(Germany) Andre Begemann (France) Albano Olivetti	(Croatia) Ivan Sabanov (Croatia) Matej Sabanov	6–3, 6–2
2019	(Serbia) Nikola Čačić (Croatia) Antonio Šančić	(Netherlands) Sander Arends (Netherlands) David Pel	6–7^{(5–7)}, 7–6^{(7–3)}, [10–7]
2018	(Belgium) Sander Gillé (Belgium) Joran Vliegen	(India) Purav Raja (Croatia) Antonio Šančić	3–6, 6–3, [10–3]
2017	(Netherlands) Sander Arends (Croatia) Antonio Šančić	(Germany) Jeremy Jahn (Israel) Edan Leshem	6–2, 5–7, [13–11]
2016	(Germany) Kevin Krawietz (France) Albano Olivetti	(Canada) Frank Dancevic (Serbia) Marko Tepavac	6–4, 6–4
2015	(Austria) Maximilian Neuchrist (Austria) Tristan-Samuel Weissborn	(Croatia) Nikola Mektić (Croatia) Antonio Šančić	7–6^{(9–7)}, 6–3
2014	(Belarus) Sergey Betov (Belarus) Aliaksandr Bury	(Republic of Ireland) James Cluskey (United States) Austin Krajicek	6–4, 7–5, [10–6]
2013	(Germany) Christopher Kas (Germany) Tim Puetz	(Germany) Benjamin Becker (Italy) Daniele Bracciali	6–2, 7–5
2011	(Germany) Dustin Brown (Croatia) Lovro Zovko	(Germany) Philipp Petzschner (Germany) Alexander Waske	6–4, 7–6^{(7–4)}
2010	(Russia) Mikhail Elgin (Russia) Alexander Kudryavtsev	(Poland) Tomasz Bednarek (Poland) Michał Przysiężny	3–6, 6–3, [10–3]

=== Women's singles ===
Year	Champion	Runner-up	Score
2025	(Spain) Eva Guerrero Álvarez	(Canada) Kayla Cross	6–4, 6–4
2024	(Poland) Weronika Falkowska	(Italy) Silvia Ambrosio	6–4, 7–5
2023	(Germany) Mona Barthel	(Latvia) Diāna Marcinkēviča	6–2, 6–7^{(6–8)}, 6–4
2022	(Croatia) Ana Konjuh	(Slovakia) Viktória Kužmová	3–6, 7–5, 7–6^{(7–2)}
2021	(Switzerland) Susan Bandecchi	(India) Karman Thandi	6–4, 6–4
2020	(Italy) Federica Di Sarra	(Liechtenstein) Kathinka von Deichmann	6–3, 6–3
2019	(Italy) Claudia Giovine	(Germany) Anja Wildgruber	4–6, 6–1, 6–1
2018	(Switzerland) Simona Waltert	(Chinese Taipei) Joanna Garland	6–4, 6–2
2017	(Italy) Federica Di Sarra	(Russia) Alina Silich	6–1, 6–3
2016	(Romania) Laura-Ioana Andrei	(Italy) Deborah Chiesa	6–2, 6–7^{(5–7)}, 6–4
2015	(Italy) Georgia Brescia	(Liechtenstein) Kathinka von Deichmann	6–4, 4–6, 6–3
2014–10	Not held		
2009	(Czech Republic) Barbora Strýcová	(Czech Republic) Klára Zakopalová	7–6^{(7–1)}, 6–3
2008	(Italy) Mara Santangelo	(Germany) Kristina Barrois	6–3, ret.
2007	(Denmark) Caroline Wozniacki	(Italy) Alberta Brianti	4–6, 7–5, 6–3
2006	(Czech Republic) Eva Birnerová	(Poland) Marta Domachowska	4–6, 7–5, 6–2
2005	(Netherlands) Michaëlla Krajicek	(Germany) Sandra Klösel	6–3, 6–3
2004	(Czech Republic) Iveta Benešová	(Hungary) Virág Németh	6–3, 6–1
2003	(Italy) Mara Santangelo	(Sweden) Sofia Arvidsson	2–6, 6–2, 6–2
2002	(Italy) Flavia Pennetta	(Germany) Angelika Bachmann	7–6^{(7–2)}, 3–6, 6–3
2001	(Slovenia) Maja Matevžič	(Russia) Ekaterina Kozhokhina	6–7^{(3–7)}, 6–3, 6–3
2000	(Belarus) Nadejda Ostrovskaya	(Belarus) Tatiana Poutchek	4–6, 6–1, 7–6^{(8–6)}

=== Women's doubles ===
Year	Champions	Runners-up	Score
2025	(Canada) Kayla Cross (United States) Anna Rogers	(Italy) Samira De Stefano (Italy) Gaia Maduzzi	7–6^{(7–4)}, 7–6^{(9–7)}
2024	(Poland) Weronika Falkowska (Sweden) Lisa Zaar	Ekaterina Ovcharenko (United Kingdom) Emily Webley-Smith	6–4, 1–6, [12–10]
2023	(Italy) Anastasia Abbagnato (Latvia) Kamilla Bartone	(Netherlands) Indy de Vroome (Serbia) Katarina Kozarov	6–4, 6–2
2022	Ekaterina Ovcharenko (Greece) Sapfo Sakellaridi	(Mexico) María Fernanda Navarro (United States) Taylor Ng	6–2, 6–4
2021	(Hong Kong) Eudice Chong (Japan) Moyuka Uchijima	(Switzerland) Susan Bandecchi (Switzerland) Ylena In-Albon	6–2, 1–6, [10–5]
2020	(Netherlands) Suzan Lamens (Belgium) Kimberley Zimmermann	(Italy) Federica Di Sarra (Finland) Anastasia Kulikova	3–6, 6–4, [11–9]
2019	(Czech Republic) Klára Hájková (Czech Republic) Aneta Laboutková	(Italy) Claudia Giovine (Russia) Maria Marfutina	6–3, 3–6, [10–7]
2018	(Slovenia) Veronika Erjavec (Slovenia) Kristina Novak	(Italy) Verena Hofer (Switzerland) Simona Waltert	6–4, 7–5
2017	(Belgium) Hélène Scholsen (Russia) Alina Silich	(Russia) Alena Fomina (Russia) Ekaterina Kazionova	6–3, 7–5
2016	(Romania) Laura Ioana Andrei (Germany) Sarah-Rebecca Sekulic	(Kyrgyzstan) Ksenia Palkina Ulukan (Italy) Anna Remondina	6–2, 6–3
2015	(Italy) Deborah Chiesa (Kosovo) Adrijana Lekaj	(Switzerland) Chiara Grimm (Switzerland) Nina Stadler	6–1, 6–3
2014–10	Not held		
2009	(Switzerland) Timea Bacsinszky (Italy) Tathiana Garbin	(Kazakhstan) Galina Voskoboeva (Czech Republic) Barbora Strýcová	6–2, 6–2
2008	(Ukraine) Mariya Koryttseva (Kazakhstan) Yaroslava Shvedova	(Estonia) Maret Ani (Kazakhstan) Galina Voskoboeva	6–2, 6–1
2007	(Czech Republic) Olga Blahotová (Ukraine) Mariya Koryttseva	(Belarus) Darya Kustova (Belarus) Tatiana Poutchek	6–3, 4–6, 6–3
2006	(Czech Republic) Lucie Hradecká (Czech Republic) Vladimíra Uhlířová	(Belarus) Tatiana Poutchek (Belarus) Anastasiya Yakimova	6–4, 6–2
2005	(Slovenia) Tina Pisnik (Czech Republic) Barbora Strýcová	(Bosnia and Herzegovina) Mervana Jugić-Salkić (Croatia) Darija Jurak	6–2, 3–6, 7–6^{(7–1)}
2004	(Czech Republic) Olga Blahotová (Czech Republic) Gabriela Navrátilová	(Bulgaria) Lubomira Bacheva (Germany) Angelika Rösch	6–1, 6–3
2003	(Germany) Vanessa Henke (Luxembourg) Claudine Schaul	(Czech Republic) Olga Blahotová (Czech Republic) Gabriela Navrátilová	6–1, 6–2
2002	(Ukraine) Yuliya Beygelzimer (Russia) Anastasia Rodionova	(Germany) Angelika Bachmann (Austria) Patricia Wartusch	6–4, 6–2
2001	(Germany) Angelika Bachmann (Denmark) Eva Dyrberg	(Russia) Ekaterina Kozhokhina (Republic of Ireland) Kelly Liggan	3–6, 6–4, 6–2
2000	(Italy) Giulia Casoni (Italy) Antonella Serra Zanetti	(Germany) Angelika Bachmann (Denmark) Eva Dyrberg	7–6^{(7–5)}, 6–2
