= 2013 PBZ Zagreb Indoors – Singles =

Singles
- 2013 PBZ Zagreb Indoors

Final
- Champion: (Croatia) Marin Čilić
- Runner-up: (Austria) Jürgen Melzer
- Score: 6–3, 6–1

Events
Singles	Doubles
← 2012 ·	PBZ Zagreb Indoors	· 2014 →

Mikhail Youzhny was the defending champion but lost in the semifinals to top-seeded Marin Čilić.
Čilić went on to win the title by defeating Jürgen Melzer 6–3, 6–1 in the final.

== Seeds ==
1. (Croatia) Marin Čilić (champion)
2. (Italy) Andreas Seppi (withdrew due to fever)
3. (Russia) Mikhail Youzhny (semifinals)
4. (Austria) Jürgen Melzer (final)
5. (Slovakia) Martin Kližan (second round)
6. (Cyprus) Marcos Baghdatis (second round)
7. (Bulgaria) Grigor Dimitrov (first round)
8. (Slovakia) Lukáš Lacko (first round, retired due to lower back injury)

== Draw ==
=== Key ===
- Q = Qualifier
- WC = Wild card
- LL = Lucky loser
- Alt = Alternate
- SE = Special exempt
- PR = Protected ranking
- ITF = ITF entry
- JE = Junior exempt
- w/o = Walkover
- r = Retired
- d = Defaulted
- SR = Special ranking

=== Finals ===
Semifinals
1	(Croatia) Marin Čilić	4	6	6
3	(Russia) Mikhail Youzhny	6	4	3
4	(Austria) Jürgen Melzer	7^{7}	6
(Netherlands) Robin Haase	6^{2}	3

Final
1	(Croatia) Marin Čilić	6	6
4	(Austria) Jürgen Melzer	3	1

=== Top half ===
First round
(Slovenia) G Žemlja	6^{5}	7^{7}	6
Q	(Serbia) I Bozoljac	7^{7}	6^{4}	2
(Slovenia) B Kavčič	6^{5}	6	6
(Slovenia) A Bedene	7^{7}	3	3
(Germany) T Kamke	7^{8}	2	4
6	(Cyprus) M Baghdatis	6^{6}	6	6
WC	(Croatia) N Mektić	4	2
(Netherlands) I Sijsling	6	6
(Croatia) I Dodig	6	7^{7}
(Germany) B Becker	2	6^{3}
(Croatia) I Karlović	7^{7}	7^{7}
7	(Bulgaria) G Dimitrov	6^{3}	6^{3}

Second round
1	(Croatia) M Čilić	6	6
(Slovenia) G Žemlja	2	3
(Slovenia) B Kavčič	3	7^{7}	6
6	(Cyprus) M Baghdatis	6	6^{2}	4
3	(Russia) M Youzhny	6	6
(Netherlands) I Sijsling	3	2
(Croatia) I Dodig	7^{7}	6^{2}	6
(Croatia) I Karlović	6^{1}	7^{7}	3

Quarterfinals
1	(Croatia) M Čilić	6	7^{7}
(Slovenia) B Kavčič	3	6^{5}
3	(Russia) M Youzhny	6	6
(Croatia) I Dodig	3	2

Semifinals
1	(Croatia) M Čilić	4	6	6
3	(Russia) M Youzhny	6	4	3

=== Bottom half ===
First round
8	(Slovakia) L Lacko	1^{r}
(Italy) F Cipolla	1
(Czech Republic) L Rosol	6	6
Q	(Croatia) F Veger	2	4
PR	(India) S Devvarman	0	7^{8}	4
Q	(Germany) M Berrer	6	6^{6}	1^{r}
5	(Slovakia) M Kližan	4	7^{8}	6
LL	(Italy) M Viola	6	6^{6}	1
WC	(Croatia) A Veić	6	3	3
(Netherlands) R Haase	2	6	6
WC	(Croatia) M Pavić	5	2
Q	(Germany) P Petzschner	7	6

Second round
(Italy) F Cipolla	4	6	3
(Czech Republic) L Rosol	6	2	6
PR	(India) S Devvarman	6	6^{5}	2
4	(Austria) J Melzer	1	7^{7}	6
5	(Slovakia) M Kližan	2	6	4
(Netherlands) R Haase	6	4	6
Q	(Germany) P Petzschner	6	6
LL	(Croatia) D Marcan	3	4

Quarterfinals
(Czech Republic) L Rosol	4	4
4	(Austria) J Melzer	6	6
(Netherlands) R Haase	6	3	6
Q	(Germany) P Petzschner	4	6	0

Semifinals
4	(Austria) J Melzer	7^{7}	6
(Netherlands) R Haase	6^{2}	3

== Qualifying ==
=== Seeds ===
1. (Germany) Michael Berrer (qualified)
2. (Germany) Philipp Petzschner (qualified)
3. (Italy) Matteo Viola (qualifying competition, lucky loser)
4. (Germany) Simon Greul (first round)
5. (United Kingdom) Jamie Baker (first round)
6. (Turkey) Marsel İlhan (first round)
7. (Slovakia) Pavol Červenák (second round)
8. (Netherlands) Boy Westerhof (second round)

=== Qualifiers ===
1. (Germany) Michael Berrer
2. (Germany) Philipp Petzschner
3. (Serbia) Ilija Bozoljac
4. (Croatia) Filip Veger

=== Lucky losers ===
1. (Croatia) Dino Marcan
2. (Italy) Matteo Viola

=== Draw ===
==== First qualifier ====
First round
1	(Germany) Michael Berrer	6	6
(Croatia) Duje Kekez	1	2
WC	(Croatia) Borna Ćorić	6	6
(Poland) Grzegorz Panfil	3	1
(Croatia) Dino Marcan	6	6
(Russia) Alexander Kudryavtsev	4	3
(Italy) Riccardo Bellotti	3	6	6
6	(Turkey) Marsel İlhan	6	4	1

Second round
1	(Germany) Michael Berrer	6	6
WC	(Croatia) Borna Ćorić	2	2
(Croatia) Dino Marcan	7	6
(Italy) Riccardo Bellotti	5	2

Qualifying competition
1	(Germany) Michael Berrer	7	6
(Croatia) Dino Marcan	5	3

==== Second qualifier ====
First round
2	(Germany) Philipp Petzschner	6	6
(Croatia) Joško Topić	3	3
(France) Alexandre Sidorenko	7^{7}	7^{7}
(Czech Republic) Jaroslav Pospíšil	6^{5}	6^{4}
(Germany) Peter Torebko	4	6	4
(Croatia) Franko Škugor	6	4	6
(Czech Republic) Jan Minář	3	3
8	(Netherlands) Boy Westerhof	6	6

Second round
2	(Germany) Philipp Petzschner	6	6
(France) Alexandre Sidorenko	2	4
(Croatia) Franko Škugor	6	7^{7}
8	(Netherlands) Boy Westerhof	4	6^{4}

Qualifying competition
2	(Germany) Philipp Petzschner	6	6
(Croatia) Franko Škugor	3	3

==== Third qualifier ====
First round
3	(Italy) Matteo Viola	6	6
(Croatia) Marin Draganja	2	4
WC	(Croatia) Franko Miočić	4	6	1
(Croatia) Toni Androić	6	4	6
(Serbia) Ilija Bozoljac	6	6
(Croatia) Mate Delić	4	4
(Bosnia and Herzegovina) Mirza Bašić	5	4
7	(Slovakia) Pavol Červenák	7	6

Second round
3	(Italy) Matteo Viola	6	7
(Croatia) Toni Androić	0	5
(Serbia) Ilija Bozoljac	7^{8}	7
7	(Slovakia) Pavol Červenák	6^{6}	5

Qualifying competition
3	(Italy) Matteo Viola	6	3	2
(Serbia) Ilija Bozoljac	3	6	6

==== Fourth qualifier ====
First round
4	(Germany) Simon Greul	7^{7}	4	1
WC	(Croatia) Filip Veger	6^{4}	6	6
(Croatia) Kristijan Mesaroš	6	4	3
(Slovakia) Kamil Čapkovič	4	6	6
WC	(Croatia) Mladen Mitak	1	2
(Croatia) Ante Pavić	6	6
(Poland) Marcin Gawron	7^{11}	6
5	(United Kingdom) Jamie Baker	6^{9}	1

Second round
WC	(Croatia) Filip Veger	6	6
(Slovakia) Kamil Čapkovič	4	2
(Croatia) Ante Pavić	6	6
(Poland) Marcin Gawron	4	3

Qualifying competition
WC	(Croatia) Filip Veger	6	3	6
(Croatia) Ante Pavić	1	6	4
