= 2014 PBZ Zagreb Indoors – Doubles =

Doubles
- 2014 PBZ Zagreb Indoors

Final
- Champions: (Netherlands) Jean-Julien Rojer (Romania) Horia Tecău
- Runners-up: (Germany) Philipp Marx (Slovakia) Michal Mertiňák
- Score: 3–6, 6–4, [10–2]

Events
Singles	Doubles
← 2013 ·	PBZ Zagreb Indoors	· 2015 →

Julian Knowle and Filip Polášek were the defending champions, but Polášek decided not to participate. Knowle played alongside Johan Brunström, but they lost in the quarterfinals to Marcelo Demoliner and Purav Raja.

Jean-Julien Rojer and Horia Tecău won the title, defeating Philipp Marx and Michal Mertiňák in the final, 3–6, 6–4, [10–2].

== Seeds ==
1. (Croatia) Ivan Dodig / (Brazil) Marcelo Melo (first round)
2. (Netherlands) Jean-Julien Rojer / (Romania) Horia Tecău (champions)
3. (Sweden) Johan Brunström / (Austria) Julian Knowle (quarterfinals)
4. (Croatia) Marin Draganja / (Croatia) Mate Pavić (semifinals)

== Draw ==
=== Key ===
- Q = Qualifier
- WC = Wild card
- LL = Lucky loser
- Alt = Alternate
- SE = Special exempt
- PR = Protected ranking
- ITF = ITF entry
- JE = Junior exempt
- w/o = Walkover
- r = Retired
- d = Defaulted
- SR = Special ranking

=== Draw ===
First round
1	(Croatia) I Dodig (Brazil) M Melo	3	4
(Germany) P Marx (Slovakia) M Mertiňák	6	6
(Croatia) I Karlović (Croatia) F Škugor	7^{7}	4	[7]
WC	(Croatia) T Androić (Croatia) M Čilić	6^{3}	6	[10]
4	(Croatia) M Draganja (Croatia) M Pavić	6	6
(Netherlands) J Huta Galung (Germany) F Moser	4	4
(Israel) J Erlich (Czech Republic) L Rosol	6	6
(Poland) T Bednarek (Poland) M Kowalczyk	1	4
(Czech Republic) F Čermák (Russia) M Elgin	3	4
(Brazil) M Demoliner (India) P Raja	6	6
WC	(Croatia) D Marcan (Croatia) N Mektić	2	6^{3}
3	(Sweden) J Brunström (Austria) J Knowle	6	7^{7}
(Germany) M Berrer (Germany) T Haas	6^{4}	3
(Ukraine) S Stakhovsky (Russia) M Youzhny	7^{7}	6
(Germany) B Becker (Germany) D Brands	2	3
2	(Netherlands) J-J Rojer (Romania) H Tecău	6	6

Quarterfinals
(Germany) P Marx (Slovakia) M Mertiňák	7	6
WC	(Croatia) T Androić (Croatia) M Čilić	5	3
4	(Croatia) M Draganja (Croatia) M Pavić	6	6
(Israel) J Erlich (Czech Republic) L Rosol	2	4
(Brazil) M Demoliner (India) P Raja	6	7
3	(Sweden) J Brunström (Austria) J Knowle	3	5
(Ukraine) S Stakhovsky (Russia) M Youzhny
2	(Netherlands) J-J Rojer (Romania) H Tecău	w/o

Semifinals
(Germany) P Marx (Slovakia) M Mertiňák	6	6
4	(Croatia) M Draganja (Croatia) M Pavić	3	4
(Brazil) M Demoliner (India) P Raja	6^{4}	6	[6]
2	(Netherlands) J-J Rojer (Romania) H Tecău	7^{7}	3	[10]

Final
(Germany) P Marx (Slovakia) M Mertiňák	6	4	[2]
2	(Netherlands) J-J Rojer (Romania) H Tecău	3	6	[10]
