= 2012 PBZ Zagreb Indoors – Singles =

Singles
- 2012 PBZ Zagreb Indoors

Final
- Champion: (Russia) Mikhail Youzhny
- Runner-up: (Slovakia) Lukáš Lacko
- Score: 6–2, 6–3

Events
Singles	Doubles
← 2011 ·	PBZ Zagreb Indoors	· 2013 →

Ivan Dodig was the defending champion, but lost in the quarterfinals to Marcos Baghdatis.

Third-seeded Mikhail Youzhny beat unseeded Lukáš Lacko in straight sets to take the 2012 title.

== Seeds ==
1. (Croatia) Ivan Ljubičić (second round)
2. (Russia) Alex Bogomolov Jr. (second round)
3. (Russia) Mikhail Youzhny (champion)
4. (Croatia) Ivan Dodig (quarterfinals)
5. (Italy) Andreas Seppi (second round)
6. (Cyprus) Marcos Baghdatis (semifinals)
7. (Netherlands) Robin Haase (quarterfinals)
8. (Croatia) Ivo Karlović (quarterfinals)

== Draw ==
=== Key ===
- Q = Qualifier
- WC = Wild card
- LL = Lucky loser
- Alt = Alternate
- SE = Special exempt
- PR = Protected ranking
- ITF = ITF entry
- JE = Junior exempt
- w/o = Walkover
- r = Retired
- d = Defaulted
- SR = Special ranking

=== Finals ===
Semifinals
(Germany) Michael Berrer	3	4
3	(Russia) Mikhail Youzhny	6	6
6	(Cyprus) Marcos Baghdatis	5	6^{3}
(Slovakia) Lukáš Lacko	7	7^{7}

Final
3	(Russia) Mikhail Youzhny	6	6
(Slovakia) Lukáš Lacko	2	3

=== Top half ===
First round
1	(Croatia) I Ljubičić	7^{7}	3	6
(Slovakia) K Beck	6^{5}	6	3
(Germany) M Berrer	7^{7}	6
Q	(Switzerland) M Chiudinelli	6^{3}	1
Q	(Austria) J Melzer	6	6
(Germany) P Petzschner	1	3
(Germany) D Brands	4	6^{1}
5	(Italy) A Seppi	6	7^{7}
3	(Russia) M Youzhny	6	7^{7}
(Ukraine) S Stakhovsky	4	6^{4}
WC	(Croatia) A Veić	6^{5}	6^{6}
(Slovenia) G Žemlja	7^{7}	7^{8}
(Israel) D Sela	3	6	6
(Germany) A Beck	6	3	2
(Slovenia) B Kavčič	6^{2}	3
8	(Croatia) I Karlović	7^{7}	6

Second round
1	(Croatia) I Ljubičić	4	4
(Germany) M Berrer	6	6
Q	(Austria) J Melzer	6	6
5	(Italy) A Seppi	2	3
3	(Russia) M Youzhny	6	6
(Slovenia) G Žemlja	1	3
(Israel) D Sela	3	2
8	(Croatia) I Karlović	6	6

Quarterfinals
(Germany) M Berrer	5	6	6
Q	(Austria) J Melzer	7	4	4
3	(Russia) M Youzhny	7^{12}	3	7^{8}
8	(Croatia) I Karlović	6^{10}	6	6^{6}

Semifinals
(Germany) M Berrer	3	4
3	(Russia) M Youzhny	6	6

=== Bottom half ===
First round
6	(Cyprus) M Baghdatis	4	6	6
(Czech Republic) L Rosol	6	3	3
(Poland) Ł Kubot	6	6
Q	(Italy) M Viola	2	1
Q	(United Kingdom) D Evans	4	6	1
(Spain) G García López	6	1	6
(Turkey) M İlhan	6^{5}	5
4	(Croatia) I Dodig	7^{7}	7
7	(Netherlands) R Haase	6	6
WC	(Croatia) K Mesaroš	2	3
(Germany) M Bachinger	6	6
(South Africa) I van der Merwe	3	3
(Italy) P Starace	6^{2}	7^{7}	3
(Slovakia) L Lacko	7^{7}	6^{4}	6
WC	(Croatia) D Marcan	3	1
2	(Russia) A Bogomolov Jr.	6	6

Second round
6	(Cyprus) M Baghdatis	6	6
(Poland) Ł Kubot	4	2
(Spain) G García López	6	4	4
4	(Croatia) I Dodig	4	6	6
7	(Netherlands) R Haase	7^{7}	3	6
(Germany) M Bachinger	6^{4}	6	3
(Slovakia) L Lacko	6	6^{1}	6
2	(Russia) A Bogomolov Jr.	0	7^{7}	1

Quarterfinals
6	(Cyprus) M Baghdatis	6	7
4	(Croatia) I Dodig	4	5
7	(Netherlands) R Haase	4	4
(Slovakia) L Lacko	6	6

Semifinals
6	(Cyprus) M Baghdatis	5	6^{3}
(Slovakia) L Lacko	7	7^{7}

== Qualifying ==
=== Seeds ===
1. (Austria) Jürgen Melzer (qualified)
2. (South Africa) Rik de Voest (qualifying competition)
3. (Canada) Frank Dancevic (first round)
4. (Italy) Matteo Viola (qualified)
5. (Germany) Simon Greul (first round)
6. (Slovenia) Aljaž Bedene (second round)
7. (Serbia) Dušan Lajović (qualifying competition)
8. (Switzerland) Marco Chiudinelli (qualified)

=== Qualifiers ===
1. (Austria) Jürgen Melzer
2. (Switzerland) Marco Chiudinelli
3. (United Kingdom) Daniel Evans
4. (Italy) Matteo Viola

== Qualifying draw ==
=== First qualifier ===
First round
1	(Austria) Jürgen Melzer	6	6
(Serbia) Nikola Ćaćić	2	1
WC	(Austria) Maximilian Neuchrist	6^{5}	0
(Slovenia) Janez Semrajc	7^{7}	6
(Croatia) Mislav Hižak	4	4
(Germany) Kevin Krawietz	6	6
(Austria) Martin Fischer	6	2	6
5	(Germany) Simon Greul	4	6	4

Second round
1	(Austria) Jürgen Melzer	6	6
(Slovenia) Janez Semrajc	1	3
(Germany) Kevin Krawietz	1	4
(Austria) Martin Fischer	6	6

Qualifying competition
1	(Austria) Jürgen Melzer	6	6
(Austria) Martin Fischer	3	4

=== Second qualifier ===
First round
2	(South Africa) Rik de Voest	6	7^{7}
(Germany) Peter Torebko	3	6^{5}
(Croatia) Ante Pavić	4	6	3
(Italy) Gianluca Naso	6	3	6
(Bosnia and Herzegovina) Mirza Bašić	6	6
(Hungary) Ádám Kellner	4	0
WC	(Croatia) Franko Miočić	4	2
8	(Switzerland) Marco Chiudinelli	6	6

Second round
2	(South Africa) Rik de Voest	6	6
(Italy) Gianluca Naso	4	3
(Bosnia and Herzegovina) Mirza Bašić	6^{3}	6	1
8	(Switzerland) Marco Chiudinelli	7^{7}	3	6

Qualifying competition
2	(South Africa) Rik de Voest	7	4	4
8	(Switzerland) Marco Chiudinelli	5	6	6

=== Third qualifier ===
First round
3	(Canada) Frank Dancevic	2	4
(United Kingdom) Daniel Evans	6	6
(Croatia) Franko Škugor	6	3	6
(Austria) Bjorn Propst	2	6	4
(Switzerland) Stéphane Bohli	6	6
(Croatia) Nikola Mektić	1	4
WC	(Croatia) Mate Pavić	3	6^{0}
6	(Slovenia) Aljaž Bedene	6	7^{7}

Second round
(United Kingdom) Daniel Evans	6	6
(Croatia) Franko Škugor	4	2
(Switzerland) Stéphane Bohli	6	6
6	(Slovenia) Aljaž Bedene	2	3

Qualifying competition
(United Kingdom) Daniel Evans	4	6	6
(Switzerland) Stéphane Bohli	6	4	0

=== Fourth qualifier ===
First round
4	(Italy) Matteo Viola	1	7	6
(Hungary) Attila Balázs	6	5	2
(Bosnia and Herzegovina) Tomislav Brkić	3	6	6^{4}
(Croatia) Toni Androić	6	4	7^{7}
WC	(Croatia) Joško Topić	2	1
(Germany) Benjamin Becker	6	6
(Italy) Riccardo Bellotti	2	6^{4}
7	(Serbia) Dušan Lajović	6	7^{7}

Second round
4	(Italy) Matteo Viola	6	3
(Croatia) Toni Androić	4	1^{r}
(Germany) Benjamin Becker	5	3
7	(Serbia) Dušan Lajović	7	6

Qualifying competition
4	(Italy) Matteo Viola	6	6
7	(Serbia) Dušan Lajović	4	2
