= 2012 PBZ Zagreb Indoors – Doubles =

Doubles
- 2012 PBZ Zagreb Indoors

Final
- Champions: (Cyprus) Marcos Baghdatis (Russia) Mikhail Youzhny
- Runners-up: (Croatia) Ivan Dodig (Croatia) Mate Pavić
- Score: 6–2, 6–2

Events
Singles	Doubles
← 2011 ·	PBZ Zagreb Indoors	· 2013 →

Dick Norman and Horia Tecău were the defending champions but Tecău chose not to compete and Norman teamed up with James Cerretani. They lost in the first round to Benjamin Becker and Alexander Waske.
Marcos Baghdatis and Mikhail Youzhny won the final against Ivan Dodig and Mate Pavić 6–2, 6–2.

== Seeds ==
1. (Austria) Jürgen Melzer / (Austria) Alexander Peya (quarterfinals)
2. (Israel) Jonathan Erlich / (Israel) Andy Ram (semifinals)
3. (United States) James Cerretani / (Belgium) Dick Norman (first round)
4. (Poland) Łukasz Kubot / (Ukraine) Sergiy Stakhovsky (first round)

== Draw ==
=== Key ===
- Q = Qualifier
- WC = Wild card
- LL = Lucky loser
- Alt = Alternate
- SE = Special exempt
- PR = Protected ranking
- ITF = ITF entry
- JE = Junior exempt
- w/o = Walkover
- r = Retired
- d = Defaulted
- SR = Special ranking

=== Draw ===
First round
1	(Austria) J Melzer (Austria) A Peya	6	6
(Netherlands) R Haase (Curaçao) J-J Rojer	3	4
(Germany) A Beck (Spain) G García-López	3	2
WC	(Croatia) I Dodig (Croatia) M Pavić	6	6
4	(Poland) Ł Kubot (Ukraine) S Stakhovsky	4	6	[5]
WC	(Croatia) M Draganja (Croatia) F Škugor	6	3	[10]
(Croatia) I Karlović (Germany) F Moser	2	6	[11]
(Russia) A Bogomolov (United States) T Parrott	6	1	[9]
(Austria) J Knowle (Germany) M Kohlmann	4	7	[5]
(Cyprus) M Baghdatis (Russia) M Youzhny	6	5	[10]
(Germany) B Becker (Germany) A Waske	7^{7}	6
3	(United States) J Cerretani (Belgium) D Norman	6^{2}	4
(Italy) D Bracciali (Czech Republic) L Rosol	6^{4}	7	[10]
(United Kingdom) J Delgado (United Kingdom) J Marray	7	5	[8]
(Slovakia) M Mertiňák (Italy) A Seppi	3	4
2	(Israel) J Erlich (Israel) A Ram	6	6

Quarterfinals
1	(Austria) J Melzer (Austria) A Peya	6	6^{7}	[7]
WC	(Croatia) I Dodig (Croatia) M Pavić	1	7^{9}	[10]
WC	(Croatia) M Draganja (Croatia) F Škugor	3	2
(Croatia) I Karlović (Germany) F Moser	6	6
(Cyprus) M Baghdatis (Russia) M Youzhny	7	7
(Germany) B Becker (Germany) A Waske	6^{3}	5
(Italy) D Bracciali (Czech Republic) L Rosol	5	6^{4}
2	(Israel) J Erlich (Israel) A Ram	7	7^{7}

Semifinals
WC	(Croatia) I Dodig (Croatia) M Pavić	6	6^{5}	[10]
(Croatia) I Karlović (Germany) F Moser	3	7^{7}	[4]
(Cyprus) M Baghdatis (Russia) M Youzhny	6	6
2	(Israel) J Erlich (Israel) A Ram	2	4

Final
WC	(Croatia) I Dodig (Croatia) M Pavić	2	2
(Cyprus) M Baghdatis (Russia) M Youzhny	6	6
