= 2014 PBZ Zagreb Indoors =

- Date: 3–9 February
- Edition: 12th
- Category: ATP World Tour 250 series
- Draw: 28S / 16D
- Prize money: €485,760
- Surface: Hard / indoor
- Location: Zagreb, Croatia
- Venue: Dom Sportova

Champions

Singles
- (Croatia) Marin Čilić

Doubles
- (Netherlands) Jean-Julien Rojer / (Romania) Horia Tecău
- PBZ Zagreb Indoors

The 2014 PBZ Zagreb Indoors was an ATP men's tennis tournament played on hard courts indoors. It was the 12th overall edition of the PBZ Zagreb Indoors, and part of the ATP World Tour 250 series of the 2014 ATP World Tour. It took place in Zagreb, Croatia from 3 February through 9 February 2014. Fifth-seeded Marin Čilić won the singles title.

== Finals ==
=== Singles ===
- (Croatia) Marin Čilić defeated (Germany) Tommy Haas, 6–3, 6–4

=== Doubles ===
- (Netherlands) Jean-Julien Rojer / (Romania) Horia Tecău defeated (Germany) Philipp Marx / (Slovakia) Michal Mertiňák, 3–6, 6–4, [10–2]

== Singles main-draw entrants ==
=== Seeds ===
Country	Player	Rank^{1}	Seed
GER	Tommy Haas	12	1
RUS	Mikhail Youzhny	14	2
GER	Philipp Kohlschreiber	27	3
CRO	Ivan Dodig	34	4
CRO	Marin Čilić	37	5
CZE	Lukáš Rosol	48	6
~~CZE~~	~~Radek Štěpánek~~	~~50~~	~~7~~
NED	Igor Sijsling	62	8

- Rankings are as of January 27, 2014.

=== Other entrants ===
The following players received wildcards into the singles main draw:

- (Croatia) Borna Ćorić
- (Croatia) Mate Delić
- (Croatia) Ante Pavić

The following players received entry from the qualifying draw:

- (Germany) Michael Berrer
- (Serbia) Peđa Krstin
- (Russia) Andrey Kuznetsov
- (Germany) Björn Phau

The following player received entry as a lucky loser:

- (United Kingdom) Daniel Evans

=== Withdrawals ===
Before the tournament

- (Bulgaria) Grigor Dimitrov
- (Spain) Feliciano López
- (Germany) Florian Mayer
- (Austria) Jürgen Melzer (shoulder injury)
- (Canada) Milos Raonic (leg injury)
- (Czech Republic) Radek Štěpánek (heel injury)
- (Serbia) Janko Tipsarević (achillar tendon injury)

== Doubles main-draw entrants ==
=== Seeds ===
Country	Player	Country	Player	Rank^{1}	Seed
CRO	Ivan Dodig	BRA	Marcelo Melo	11	1
NED	Jean-Julien Rojer	ROU	Horia Tecău	50	2
SWE	Johan Brunström	AUT	Julian Knowle	78	3
CRO	Marin Draganja	CRO	Mate Pavić	115	4

- Rankings are as of January 27, 2014.

=== Other entrants ===
The following pairs received wildcards into the doubles main draw:

- (Croatia) Toni Androić / (Croatia) Marin Čilić
- (Croatia) Dino Marcan / (Croatia) Nikola Mektić

=== Withdrawals ===
During the tournament

- (Russia) Mikhail Youzhny (illness)
