= 2006 PBZ Zagreb Indoors – Doubles =

Doubles
- 2006 PBZ Zagreb Indoors

Final
- Champions: (Czech Republic) Jaroslav Levinský (Slovakia) Michal Mertiňák
- Runners-up: (Italy) Davide Sanguinetti (Italy) Andreas Seppi
- Score: 7–6^{(9–7)}, 6–1

Details
- Draw: 16
- Seeds: 4

Events
Singles	Doubles
- PBZ Zagreb Indoors

The event was being held for the first time since 1997.

Jaroslav Levinský and Michal Mertiňák won the title, defeating Davide Sanguinetti and Andreas Seppi 7–6^{(9–7)}, 6–1 in the final.

== Seeds ==
1. (Czech Republic) Petr Pála / (Czech Republic) Pavel Vízner (quarterfinals)
2. (Czech Republic) Jaroslav Levinský / (Slovakia) Michal Mertiňák (champions)
3. (Spain) David Ferrer / (Spain) Feliciano López (first round)
4. (Czech Republic) Radek Štěpánek / (Russia) Mikhail Youzhny (first round)

== Draw ==
Key

- Q = Qualifier
- WC = Wild card
- LL = Lucky loser
- Alt = Alternate
- ITF = ITF entry
- PR = Protected ranking
- SR = Special ranking
- SE = Special exempt
- JE = Junior exempt
- JR = Junior Accelerator Programme entrant
- CO = College Accelerator Programme entrant
- NG = Next Gen Accelerator Program entrant
- w/o = Walkover
- r = Retired
- d = Defaulted

=== Draw ===
First round
1	(Czech Republic) P Pála (Czech Republic) P Vízner	7	6^{7}	[10]
(Czech Republic) R Vik (Czech Republic) T Zíb	5	7^{9}	[5]
(Croatia) I Karlović (Croatia) L Zovko	6	6
(Italy) L Azzaro (Italy) P Starace	4	3
4	(Czech Republic) R Štěpánek (Russia) M Youzhny	7^{7}	3	[6]
(Czech Republic) I Minář (Czech Republic) J Minář	6^{5}	6	[10]
WC	(Croatia) N Mektić (Croatia) A Šančić	2	5
(Italy) D Sanguinetti (Italy) A Seppi	6	7
(Serbia and Montenegro) N Djokovic (Russia) D Tursunov	6	7^{7}
Alt	(Italy) S Bolelli (Italy) M Dell'Acqua	3	6^{2}
(Italy) D Bracciali (Italy) G Galimberti	7^{7}	4	[10]
3	(Spain) D Ferrer (Spain) F López	6^{3}	6	[7]
WC	(Croatia) M Čilić (Croatia) I Ljubičić	6^{4}	7^{7}	[7]
(Switzerland) Y Allegro (Switzerland) S Wawrinka	7^{7}	6^{3}	[10]
(Czech Republic) T Cakl (Slovakia) I Zelenay	6^{6}	3
2	(Czech Republic) J Levinský (Slovakia) M Mertiňák	7^{8}	6

Quarterfinals
1	(Czech Republic) P Pála (Czech Republic) P Vízner	0	1
(Croatia) I Karlović (Croatia) L Zovko	6	6
(Czech Republic) I Minář (Czech Republic) J Minář	3	4
(Italy) D Sanguinetti (Italy) A Seppi	6	6
(Serbia and Montenegro) N Djokovic (Russia) D Tursunov	4	6^{6}
(Italy) D Bracciali (Italy) G Galimberti	6	7^{8}
(Switzerland) Y Allegro (Switzerland) S Wawrinka
2	(Czech Republic) J Levinský (Slovakia) M Mertiňák	w/o

Semifinals
(Croatia) I Karlović (Croatia) L Zovko	4	7^{7}	[7]
(Italy) D Sanguinetti (Italy) A Seppi	6	6^{2}	[10]
(Italy) D Bracciali (Italy) G Galimberti	3	7^{7}	[7]
2	(Czech Republic) J Levinský (Slovakia) M Mertiňák	6	6^{4}	[10]

Final
(Italy) D Sanguinetti (Italy) A Seppi	6^{7}	1
2	(Czech Republic) J Levinský (Slovakia) M Mertiňák	7^{9}	6
