= 2012 PBZ Zagreb Indoors =

- Date: 28 January – 5 February
- Edition: 10th
- Category: ATP World Tour 250 series
- Draw: 28S / 16D
- Prize money: €450,000
- Surface: Hard / indoor
- Location: Zagreb, Croatia
- Venue: Dom Sportova

Champions

Singles
- (Russia) Mikhail Youzhny

Doubles
- (Cyprus) Marcos Baghdatis / (Russia) Mikhail Youzhny
- PBZ Zagreb Indoors

The 2012 PBZ Zagreb Indoors was an ATP men's tennis tournament played on hard courts indoors. It was the 10th overall edition of the PBZ Zagreb Indoors, and was part of the ATP World Tour 250 series of the 2012 ATP World Tour. It took place in Zagreb, Croatia from January 28 through February 5, 2012. Mikhail Youzhny won the singles title.

== Finals ==
=== Singles ===
(Russia) Mikhail Youzhny defeated (Slovakia) Lukáš Lacko, 6–2, 6–3

- It was Youzhny's 1st title of the year and 8th of his career.

=== Doubles ===
(Cyprus) Marcos Baghdatis / (Russia) Mikhail Youzhny defeated (Croatia) Ivan Dodig / (Croatia) Mate Pavić, 6–2, 6–2

== Singles main-draw entrants ==
=== Seeds ===
Country	Player	Rank^{1}	Seed
CRO	Ivan Ljubičić	30	1
RUS	Alex Bogomolov Jr.	34	2
RUS	Mikhail Youzhny	35	3
CRO	Ivan Dodig	36	4
ITA	Andreas Seppi	40	5
CYP	Marcos Baghdatis	44	6
NED	Robin Haase	53	7
CRO	Ivo Karlović	57	8

- Rankings are as of January 16, 2012

=== Other entrants ===
The following players received wildcards into the singles main draw:

- (Croatia) Dino Marcan
- (Croatia) Kristijan Mesaroš
- (Croatia) Antonio Veić

The following players received entry from the qualifying draw:

- (Switzerland) Marco Chiudinelli
- (United Kingdom) Daniel Evans
- (Austria) Jürgen Melzer
- (Italy) Matteo Viola

== Doubles main-draw entrants ==
=== Seeds ===
Country	Player	Country	Player	Rank^{1}	Seed
AUT	Jürgen Melzer	AUT	Alexander Peya	30	1
ISR	Jonathan Erlich	ISR	Andy Ram	91	2
USA	James Cerretani	BEL	Dick Norman	92	3
POL	Łukasz Kubot	UKR	Sergiy Stakhovsky	100	4

- Rankings are as of January 16, 2012

=== Other entrants ===
The following pairs received wildcards into the doubles main draw:

- (Croatia) Ivan Dodig / (Croatia) Mate Pavić
- (Croatia) Marin Draganja / (Croatia) Franco Škugor
