= 2013 PBZ Zagreb Indoors – Doubles =

Doubles
- 2013 PBZ Zagreb Indoors

Final
- Champions: (Austria) Julian Knowle (Slovakia) Filip Polášek
- Runners-up: (Croatia) Ivan Dodig (Croatia) Mate Pavić
- Score: 6–3, 6–3

Events
Singles	Doubles
← 2012 ·	PBZ Zagreb Indoors	· 2014 →

Marcos Baghdatis and Mikhail Youzhny were the defending champions but retired in the second round because of Baghdatis's foot injury.
Julian Knowle and Filip Polášek won the title, defeating Ivan Dodig and Mate Pavić 6–3, 6–3 in the final.

== Seeds ==
1. (Sweden) Robert Lindstedt / (Romania) Horia Tecău (first round)
2. (Austria) Julian Knowle / (Slovakia) Filip Polášek (champions)
3. (Mexico) Santiago González / (United States) Scott Lipsky (first round)
4. (Austria) Jürgen Melzer / (Germany) Philipp Petzschner (quarterfinals)

== Draw ==
=== Key ===
- Q = Qualifier
- WC = Wild card
- LL = Lucky loser
- Alt = Alternate
- SE = Special exempt
- PR = Protected ranking
- ITF = ITF entry
- JE = Junior exempt
- w/o = Walkover
- r = Retired
- d = Defaulted
- SR = Special ranking

=== Draw ===
First round
1	(Sweden) R Lindstedt (Romania) H Tecău	2	1
(Cyprus) M Baghdatis (Russia) M Youzhny	6	6
(Germany) P Marx (Romania) F Mergea	6	6
(Croatia) M Čilić (Croatia) M Draganja	3	3
4	(Austria) J Melzer (Germany) P Petzschner	6^{3}	6	[10]
(Russia) M Elgin (Slovakia) I Zelenay	7^{7}	4	[4]
(Netherlands) R Haase (Netherlands) I Sijsling	2	3
(Croatia) I Dodig (Croatia) M Pavić	6	6
Alt	(Italy) F Cipolla (India) S Devvarman	6	6
WC	(Croatia) M Delić (Croatia) F Škugor	4	2
(Germany) B Becker (Czech Republic) L Rosol	6	3	[10]
3	(Mexico) S González (United States) S Lipsky	4	6	[6]
(Croatia) I Karlović (Germany) F Moser	6^{7}	6^{2}
Alt	(Slovenia) A Bedene (Czech Republic) J Pospíšil	7^{9}	7^{7}
WC	(Croatia) T Androić (Croatia) D Marcan	6	1	[4]
2	(Austria) J Knowle (Slovakia) F Polášek	3	6	[10]

Quarterfinals
(Cyprus) M Baghdatis (Russia) M Youzhny
(Germany) P Marx (Romania) F Mergea	w/o
4	(Austria) J Melzer (Germany) P Petzschner	6^{5}	5
(Croatia) I Dodig (Croatia) M Pavić	7^{7}	7
Alt	(Italy) F Cipolla (India) S Devvarman	6	6
(Germany) B Becker (Czech Republic) L Rosol	2	2
Alt	(Slovenia) A Bedene (Czech Republic) J Pospíšil	7	3	[10]
2	(Austria) J Knowle (Slovakia) F Polášek	5	6	[12]

Semifinals
(Germany) P Marx (Romania) F Mergea	6^{4}	7^{7}	[3]
(Croatia) I Dodig (Croatia) M Pavić	7^{7}	6^{4}	[10]
Alt	(Italy) F Cipolla (India) S Devvarman	2	2
2	(Austria) J Knowle (Slovakia) F Polášek	6	6

Final
(Croatia) I Dodig (Croatia) M Pavić	3	3
2	(Austria) J Knowle (Slovakia) F Polášek	6	6
