= 2006 PBZ Zagreb Indoors – Singles =

Tennis tournament

Singles
- 2006 PBZ Zagreb Indoors

Final
- Champion: (Croatia) Ivan Ljubičić
- Runner-up: (Austria) Stefan Koubek
- Score: 6–3, 6–4

Details
- Draw: 32
- Seeds: 8

Events
Singles	Doubles
- PBZ Zagreb Indoors

Ivan Ljubičić won the title, defeating Stefan Koubek 6–3, 6–4 in the final.

== Seeds ==
1. (Croatia) Ivan Ljubičić (champion)
2. (Spain) David Ferrer (first round)
3. (France) Richard Gasquet (second round)
4. (Czech Republic) Radek Štěpánek (second round)
5. (Croatia) Mario Ančić (second round)
6. (Finland) Jarkko Nieminen (second round)
7. (Russia) Igor Andreev (first round)
8. (Spain) Feliciano López (second round)

== Draw ==
Key

- Q = Qualifier
- WC = Wild card
- LL = Lucky loser
- Alt = Alternate
- ITF = ITF entry
- PR = Protected ranking
- SR = Special ranking
- SE = Special exempt
- JE = Junior exempt
- JR = Junior Accelerator Programme entrant
- CO = College Accelerator Programme entrant
- NG = Next Gen Accelerator Program entrant
- w/o = Walkover
- r = Retired
- d = Defaulted

=== Finals ===
Semifinals
1	(Croatia) Ivan Ljubičić	6^{6}	6	6
(Serbia and Montenegro) Novak Djokovic	7^{8}	3	4
(United Kingdom) Tim Henman	3	6	2
Q	(Austria) Stefan Koubek	6	3	6

Final
1	(Croatia) Ivan Ljubičić	6	6
Q	(Austria) Stefan Koubek	3	4

=== Top half ===
First round
1	(Croatia) I Ljubičić	4	6	6
WC	(United Kingdom) A Murray	6	2	3
(Czech Republic) J Hernych	2	4
(Denmark) K Carlsen	6	6
(Czech Republic) T Zíb	4	6	1
(Russia) M Youzhny	6	3	6
(Italy) P Starace	6	5	3
6	(Finland) J Nieminen	3	7	6
4	(Czech Republic) R Štěpánek	6	7^{7}
Q	(Czech Republic) T Cakl	3	6^{2}
(Serbia and Montenegro) N Djokovic	6	7
(Czech Republic) R Vik	1	5
(Italy) D Bracciali	4	6^{5}
Q	(Serbia and Montenegro) I Bozoljac	6	7^{7}
(Sweden) R Söderling	6^{4}	6	1
8	(Spain) F López	7^{7}	4	6

Second round
1	(Croatia) I Ljubičić	7^{7}	6
(Denmark) K Carlsen	6^{5}	4
(Russia) M Youzhny	2	7^{7}	7^{7}
6	(Finland) J Nieminen	6	6^{3}	6^{0}
4	(Czech Republic) R Štěpánek	3	4
(Serbia and Montenegro) N Djokovic	6	6
Q	(Serbia and Montenegro) I Bozoljac	7^{7}	6
8	(Spain) F López	6^{5}	2

Quarterfinals
1	(Croatia) I Ljubičić	6	6
(Russia) M Youzhny	3	2
(Serbia and Montenegro) N Djokovic	6	6
Q	(Serbia and Montenegro) I Bozoljac	2	3

Semifinals
1	(Croatia) I Ljubičić	6^{6}	6	6
(Serbia and Montenegro) N Djokovic	7^{8}	3	4

=== Bottom half ===
First round
7	(Russia) I Andreev	3	6	3
WC	(Croatia) M Čilić	6	1	6
(Italy) A Seppi	6	6
Q	(Israel) N Okun	2	4
(France) A Clément	3	3
(United Kingdom) T Henman	6	6
(Italy) D Sanguinetti	3	0
WC/3	(France) R Gasquet	6	6
5	(Croatia) M Ančić	6	4	6
(Russia) D Tursunov	3	6	4
(Germany) R Schüttler	6^{0}	3
(Croatia) I Karlović	7^{7}	6
Q	(Austria) S Koubek	7^{9}	3	6
(Czech Republic) I Minář	6^{7}	6	3
(Switzerland) S Wawrinka	4	6	6
2	(Spain) D Ferrer	6	1	3

Second round
WC	(Croatia) M Čilić	6	4	4
(Italy) A Seppi	4	6	6
(United Kingdom) T Henman	6	6
WC/3	(France) R Gasquet	4	4
5	(Croatia) M Ančić	6^{7}	6^{4}
(Croatia) I Karlović	7^{9}	7^{7}
Q	(Austria) S Koubek	6	6
(Switzerland) S Wawrinka	4	4

Quarterfinals
(Italy) A Seppi	3	4
(United Kingdom) T Henman	6	6
(Croatia) I Karlović	6^{4}	7^{8}	3
Q	(Austria) S Koubek	7^{7}	6^{6}	6

Semifinals
(United Kingdom) T Henman	3	6	2
Q	(Austria) S Koubek	6	3	6
