= 2011 PBZ Zagreb Indoors – Singles =

Singles
- 2011 PBZ Zagreb Indoors

Final
- Champion: (Croatia) Ivan Dodig
- Runner-up: (Germany) Michael Berrer
- Score: 6–3, 6–4

Events
Singles	Doubles
← 2010 ·	PBZ Zagreb Indoors	· 2012 →

Marin Čilić was the two-time defending champion; however, he was eliminated by Florian Mayer in the quarterfinals.
Ivan Dodig claimed the first ATP title of his career, by defeating Michael Berrer 6–3, 6–4 in the final match.

== Seeds ==
First four seeds received a bye into the second round.

1. (Croatia) Marin Čilić (quarterfinals)
2. (Croatia) Ivan Ljubičić (quarterfinals)
3. (Spain) Guillermo García-López (semifinals)
4. (France) Richard Gasquet (quarterfinals, retired)
5. (Germany) Florian Mayer (semifinals)
6. (Spain) Marcel Granollers (first round)
7. (Germany) Philipp Petzschner (second round)
8. (Germany) Michael Berrer (final)

== Draw ==
=== Key ===
- Q = Qualifier
- WC = Wild card
- LL = Lucky loser
- Alt = Alternate
- SE = Special exempt
- PR = Protected ranking
- ITF = ITF entry
- JE = Junior exempt
- w/o = Walkover
- r = Retired
- d = Defaulted
- SR = Special ranking

=== Finals ===
Semifinals
5	(Germany) Florian Mayer	1	4
8	(Germany) Michael Berrer	6	6
3	(Spain) Guillermo García-López	6	6^{5}	4
(Croatia) Ivan Dodig	4	7	6

Final
8	(Germany) Michael Berrer	3	4
(Croatia) Ivan Dodig	6	6

=== Top half ===
First round
(Czech Republic) J Pospíšil	3	2
(Russia) I Kunitsyn	6	6
(Czech Republic) R Štěpánek	6	6
Q	(Austria) S Koubek	3	2
WC	(Croatia) F Škugor	6	3	6^{6}
5	(Germany) F Mayer	3	6	7
(France) A Clément	6	6
(Kazakhstan) M Kukushkin	4	2
Q	(Slovenia) B Kavčič	6	7
(Germany) M Zverev	2	5
WC	(Croatia) N Mektić	5	1
8	(Germany) M Berrer	7	6

Second round
1	(Croatia) M Čilić	7	6
(Russia) I Kunitsyn	6^{3}	2
(Czech Republic) R Štěpánek	6^{2}	3
5	(Germany) F Mayer	7	6
4	(France) R Gasquet	w/o
(France) A Clément
Q	(Slovenia) B Kavčič	4	1
8	(Germany) M Berrer	6	6

Quarterfinals
1	(Croatia) M Čilić	3	4
5	(Germany) F Mayer	6	6
4	(France) R Gasquet	2	r
8	(Germany) M Berrer	5

Semifinals
5	(Germany) F Mayer	1	4
8	(Germany) M Berrer	6	6

=== Bottom half ===
First round
7	(Germany) P Petzschner	6	6
(Czech Republic) J Hájek	3	3
Q	(United States) A Bogomolov Jr.	2	7	7
WC	(Croatia) A Veić	6	6^{4}	6^{2}
(Slovakia) L Lacko	4	6	7
(Turkey) M İlhan	6	4	5
6	(Spain) M Granollers	3	2
(Croatia) I Dodig	6	6
(Ukraine) I Marchenko	7	6
Q	(Serbia) D Lajović	5	2
(Germany) D Brands	7	6^{2}	7
(Croatia) I Karlović	5	7	6^{1}

Second round
7	(Germany) P Petzschner	1	2
Q	(United States) A Bogomolov Jr.	6	6
(Slovakia) L Lacko	1	6	2
3	(Spain) G García-López	6	2	6
(Croatia) I Dodig	6	6
(Ukraine) I Marchenko	2	3
(Germany) D Brands	2	3
2	(Croatia) I Ljubičić	6	6

Quarterfinals
Q	(United States) A Bogomolov Jr.	2	6^{8}
3	(Spain) G García-López	6	7
(Croatia) I Dodig	6	6
2	(Croatia) I Ljubičić	4	4

Semifinals
3	(Spain) G García-López	6	6^{5}	4
(Croatia) I Dodig	4	7	6
