= 2013 PBZ Zagreb Indoors =

- Date: 4–10 February
- Edition: 11th
- Category: ATP World Tour 250 series
- Draw: 28S / 16D
- Prize money: €467,800
- Surface: Hard / Indoor
- Location: Zagreb, Croatia
- Venue: Dom Sportova

Champions

Singles
- (Croatia) Marin Čilić

Doubles
- (Austria) Julian Knowle / (Slovakia) Filip Polášek
- PBZ Zagreb Indoors

The 2013 PBZ Zagreb Indoors was an ATP men's tennis tournament played on indoor hardcourts. It was the 11th overall edition of the PBZ Zagreb Indoors, and part of the ATP World Tour 250 series of the 2013 ATP World Tour. It took place in Zagreb, Croatia from 4 February through 10 February 2013. First-seeded Marin Čilić won the singles title.

== Champions ==
=== Singles ===
- (Croatia) Marin Čilić defeated (Austria) Jürgen Melzer, 6–3, 6–1

=== Doubles ===
- (Austria) Julian Knowle / (Slovakia) Filip Polášek defeated (Croatia) Ivan Dodig / (Croatia) Mate Pavić, 6–3, 6–3

== Singles main-draw entrants ==
=== Seeds ===
Country	Player	Rank^{1}	Seed
CRO	Marin Čilić	13	1
~~ITA~~	~~Andreas Seppi~~	~~18~~	~~2~~
RUS	Mikhail Youzhny	27	3
AUT	Jürgen Melzer	30	4
SVK	Martin Kližan	33	5
CYP	Marcos Baghdatis	35	6
BUL	Grigor Dimitrov	40	7
SVK	Lukáš Lacko	49	8

- Rankings are as of January 28, 2013.

=== Other entrants ===
The following players received wildcards into the singles main draw:

- (Croatia) Nikola Mektić
- (Croatia) Mate Pavić
- (Croatia) Antonio Veić

The following players received entry from the qualifying draw:

- (Germany) Michael Berrer
- (Serbia) Ilija Bozoljac
- (Germany) Philipp Petzschner
- (Croatia) Filip Veger

The following players received entry as lucky losers:

- (Croatia) Dino Marcan
- (Italy) Matteo Viola

=== Withdrawals ===
Before the tournament

- (Russia) Evgeny Donskoy
- (Poland) Łukasz Kubot (ankle injury)
- (Luxembourg) Gilles Müller
- (Germany) Björn Phau
- (Italy) Andreas Seppi (fever)

=== Retirements ===
- (Germany) Michael Berrer (fatigue)
- (Slovakia) Lukáš Lacko (lower back injury)

== Doubles main-draw entrants ==
=== Seeds ===
Country	Player	Country	Player	Rank^{1}	Seed
SWE	Robert Lindstedt	ROU	Horia Tecău	17	1
AUT	Julian Knowle	SVK	Filip Polášek	68	2
MEX	Santiago González	USA	Scott Lipsky	68	3
AUT	Jürgen Melzer	GER	Philipp Petzschner	75	4

- Rankings are as of January 28, 2013.

=== Other entrants ===
The following pairs received wildcards into the doubles main draw:

- (Croatia) Toni Androić / (Croatia) Dino Marcan
- (Croatia) Mate Delić / (Croatia) Franko Škugor

=== Withdrawals ===
Before the tournament

- (Russia) Evgeny Donskoy
- (Slovakia) Lukáš Lacko (lower back injury)
- (Germany) Björn Phau
- (Italy) Andreas Seppi (fever)

During the tournament

- (Cyprus) Marcos Baghdatis (foot injury)
