= 2006 PBZ Zagreb Indoors =

- Date: 30 January – 6 February
- Edition: 4th
- Category: ATP International Series
- Draw: 32S / 16D
- Prize money: $380,000
- Surface: Carpet / indoor
- Location: Zagreb, Croatia
- Venue: Dom Sportova

Champions

Singles
- (Croatia) Ivan Ljubičić

Doubles
- (Czech Republic) Jaroslav Levinský / (Slovakia) Michal Mertiňák
- PBZ Zagreb Indoors

The 2006 PBZ Zagreb Indoors was a men's tennis tournament held on indoor carpet courts. It was the first edition of the PBZ Zagreb Indoors under its new name and 4th overall and was part of the ATP International Series of the 2006 ATP Tour. It took place at the Dom Sportova in Zagreb, Croatia from 30 January through 6 February 2006. First-seeded Ivan Ljubičić won the singles title.

== Finals ==
=== Singles ===
(Croatia) Ivan Ljubičić defeated (Austria) Stefan Koubek 6–3, 6–4

- It was Ljubičić's 2nd singles title of the year and the 5th of his career.

=== Doubles ===
(Czech Republic) Jaroslav Levinský / (Slovakia) Michal Mertiňák defeated (Italy) Davide Sanguinetti / (Italy) Andreas Seppi 7–6^{(9–7)}, 6–1
