= 2011 PBZ Zagreb Indoors – Doubles =

Doubles
- 2011 PBZ Zagreb Indoors

Final
- Champions: (Belgium) Dick Norman (Romania) Horia Tecău
- Runners-up: (Spain) Marcel Granollers (Spain) Marc López
- Score: 6–3, 6–4

Events
Singles	Doubles
← 2010 ·	PBZ Zagreb Indoors	· 2012 →

Jürgen Melzer and Philipp Petzschner were the defending champions, but Melzer decided not to participate this year.
Petzschner played with Michael Kohlmann, but they lost to Lukáš Dlouhý and Radek Štěpánek already in the first round.
Dick Norman and Horia Tecău won this tournament, by defeating Marcel Granollers and Marc López 6–3, 6–4 in the final match.

== Seeds ==
1. (Spain) Marcel Granollers / (Spain) Marc López (final)
2. (Belgium) Dick Norman / (Romania) Horia Tecău (champions)
3. (Sweden) Simon Aspelin / (Austria) Julian Knowle (semifinals)
4. (Germany) Philipp Petzschner / (Germany) Michael Kohlmann (first round)

== Draw ==
=== Key ===
- Q = Qualifier
- WC = Wild card
- LL = Lucky loser
- Alt = Alternate
- SE = Special exempt
- PR = Protected ranking
- ITF = ITF entry
- JE = Junior exempt
- w/o = Walkover
- r = Retired
- d = Defaulted
- SR = Special ranking

=== Draw ===
First round
1	(Spain) M Granollers (Spain) M López	3	6	[10]
WC	(Croatia) N Mektić (Croatia) I Zovko	6	3	[2]
(Spain) G García-López (Germany) M Zverev	3	4
(Israel) J Erlich (Israel) A Ram	6	6
4	(Germany) P Petzschner (Germany) M Kohlmann	6	6^{3}	[6]
(Czech Republic) L Dlouhý (Czech Republic) R Štěpánek	4	7	[10]
(Slovakia) F Polášek (Slovakia) I Zelenay	7	6
WC	(Croatia) M Čilić (Croatia) G Ivanišević	6^{4}	4
(Croatia) I Dodig (Croatia) L Zovko	6	7
(Germany) F Moser (Czech Republic) D Škoch	3	6^{5}
(Russia) I Kunitsyn (Croatia) I Ljubičić	2	0
3	(Sweden) S Aspelin (Austria) J Knowle	6	6
(France) A Clément (Germany) C Kas	6	3	[10]
(Germany) M Berrer (Germany) F Mayer	4	6	[6]
(Croatia) I Karlović (Serbia) D Vemić	7	6^{4}	[8]
2	(Belgium) D Norman (Romania) H Tecău	6^{4}	7	[10]

Quarterfinals
1	(Spain) M Granollers (Spain) M López	6	7
(Israel) J Erlich (Israel) A Ram	2	6^{3}
(Czech Republic) L Dlouhý (Czech Republic) R Štěpánek	6^{5}	3
(Slovakia) F Polášek (Slovakia) I Zelenay	7	6
(Croatia) I Dodig (Croatia) L Zovko	7	5	2
3	(Sweden) S Aspelin (Austria) J Knowle	5	7	[10]
(France) A Clément (Germany) C Kas
2	(Belgium) D Norman (Romania) H Tecău	w/o

Semifinals
1	(Spain) M Granollers (Spain) M López	3	6	[10]
(Slovakia) F Polášek (Slovakia) I Zelenay	6	3	[5]
3	(Sweden) S Aspelin (Austria) J Knowle	2	3
2	(Belgium) D Norman (Romania) H Tecău	6	6

Final
1	(Spain) M Granollers (Spain) M López	3	4
2	(Belgium) D Norman (Romania) H Tecău	6	6
