= 2014 PBZ Zagreb Indoors – Singles =

Singles
- 2014 PBZ Zagreb Indoors

Final
- Champion: (Croatia) Marin Čilić
- Runner-up: (Germany) Tommy Haas
- Score: 6–3, 6–4

Events
Singles	Doubles
- PBZ Zagreb Indoors

Marin Čilić was the defending champion and successfully defended his title, defeating Tommy Haas in the final, 6–3, 6–4.

== Seeds ==
1. (Germany) Tommy Haas (final)
2. (Russia) Mikhail Youzhny (second round)
3. (Germany) Philipp Kohlschreiber (quarterfinals)
4. (Croatia) Ivan Dodig (quarterfinals)
5. (Croatia) Marin Čilić (champion)
6. (Czech Republic) Lukáš Rosol (first round)
7. (Czech Republic) Radek Štěpánek (withdrew because of a right heel injury)
8. (Netherlands) Igor Sijsling (second round)

== Draw ==
Key

- Q = Qualifier
- WC = Wild card
- LL = Lucky loser
- Alt = Alternate
- ITF = ITF entry
- PR = Protected ranking
- SR = Special ranking
- SE = Special exempt
- JE = Junior exempt
- JR = Junior Accelerator Programme entrant
- CO = College Accelerator Programme entrant
- NG = Next Gen Accelerator Program entrant
- w/o = Walkover
- r = Retired
- d = Defaulted

=== Finals ===
Semifinals
1	(Germany) Tommy Haas	5	6	6
LL	(United Kingdom) Daniel Evans	7	4	3
5	(Croatia) Marin Čilić	6	6
Q	(Germany) Björn Phau	3	4

Final
1	(Germany) Tommy Haas	3	4
5	(Croatia) Marin Čilić	6	6

=== Top half ===
First round
(Netherlands) J Huta Galung	7^{7}	3	6^{6}
(Germany) B Becker	6^{4}	6	7^{8}
Q	(Russia) A Kuznetsov	6	7^{10}
(Ukraine) S Stakhovsky	4	6^{8}
(Slovenia) B Kavčič	7^{7}	3	4
8	(Netherlands) I Sijsling	6^{4}	6	6
(Kazakhstan) A Golubev	7^{8}	4	7^{7}
(Romania) V Hănescu	6^{6}	6	6^{5}
Q	(Germany) M Berrer	6	3	6
WC	(Croatia) B Ćorić	4	6	4
(Czech Republic) J Hájek	3	1
LL	(United Kingdom) D Evans	6	6

Second round
1	(Germany) T Haas	4	6	6
(Germany) B Becker	6	3	3
Q	(Russia) A Kuznetsov	1	6	7^{7}
8	(Netherlands) I Sijsling	6	3	6^{5}
3	(Germany) P Kohlschreiber	6	6
(Kazakhstan) A Golubev	4	2
Q	(Germany) M Berrer	6	1	6^{4}
LL	(United Kingdom) D Evans	1	6	7^{7}

Quarterfinals
1	(Germany) T Haas	7^{8}	6
Q	(Russia) A Kuznetsov	6^{6}	4
3	(Germany) P Kohlschreiber	4	6	4
LL	(United Kingdom) D Evans	6	2	6

Semifinals
1	(Germany) T Haas	5	6	6
LL	(United Kingdom) D Evans	7	4	3

=== Bottom half ===
First round
5	(Croatia) M Čilić	6	6
WC	(Croatia) M Delić	4	4
(Serbia) D Lajović	6	6
Q	(Serbia) P Krstin	2	3
(Germany) D Brands	7^{7}	5	6^{3}
(Croatia) I Karlović	6^{4}	7	7^{7}
6	(Czech Republic) L Rosol	3	6^{2}
(Israel) D Sela	6	7^{7}
(Slovakia) L Lacko	6	6
(Germany) J-L Struff	4	4
Q	(Germany) B Phau	6	6
WC	(Croatia) A Pavić	3	4

Second round
5	(Croatia) M Čilić	6	7
(Serbia) D Lajović	4	5
(Croatia) I Karlović	6^{5}	3
4	(Croatia) I Dodig	7^{7}	6
(Israel) D Sela	6	6
(Slovakia) L Lacko	3	2
Q	(Germany) B Phau	4	7	6
2	(Russia) M Youzhny	6	5	1

Quarterfinals
5	(Croatia) M Čilić	7	6
4	(Croatia) I Dodig	5	4
(Israel) D Sela	4	3
Q	(Germany) B Phau	6	6

Semifinals
5	(Croatia) M Čilić	6	6
Q	(Germany) B Phau	3	4

== Qualifying ==
=== Seeds ===
1. (Cyprus) Marcos Baghdatis (first round)
2. (Russia) Andrey Kuznetsov (qualified)
3. (United Kingdom) Daniel Evans (qualifying competition, Lucky loser)
4. (Germany) Michael Berrer (qualified)
5. (Italy) Marco Cecchinato (qualifying competition)
6. (Italy) Matteo Viola (second round)
7. (Italy) Flavio Cipolla (second round)
8. (Austria) Martin Fischer (qualifying competition)

=== Qualifiers ===
1. (Serbia) Peđa Krstin
2. (Russia) Andrey Kuznetsov
3. (Germany) Björn Phau
4. (Germany) Michael Berrer

=== Qualifying draw ===
==== First qualifier ====
First round
1	(Cyprus) Marcos Baghdatis	6	4	4
(Serbia) Peđa Krstin	2	6	6
(Belgium) Yannick Mertens	2	5
(Italy) Gianluigi Quinzi	6	7
(Poland) Piotr Gadomski	6^{6}	5
(Italy) Andrea Arnaboldi	7^{8}	7
(Uzbekistan) Farrukh Dustov	1	2
8	(Austria) Martin Fischer	6	6

Second round
(Serbia) Peđa Krstin	7	6
(Italy) Gianluigi Quinzi	5	2
(Italy) Andrea Arnaboldi	2	0
8	(Austria) Martin Fischer	6	6

Qualifying competition
(Serbia) Peđa Krstin	2	6	6
8	(Austria) Martin Fischer	6	3	2

==== Second qualifier ====
First round
2	(Russia) Andrey Kuznetsov	7	6
(Republic of Ireland) Louk Sorensen	5	4
(Italy) Riccardo Bellotti	5	4
(Austria) Dennis Novak	7	6
(Croatia) Mate Pavić	7^{7}	7^{7}
(Croatia) Toni Androić	6^{5}	6^{5}
WC	(Croatia) Dino Marcan	4	4
7	(Italy) Flavio Cipolla	6	6

Second round
2	(Russia) Andrey Kuznetsov	6	6
(Austria) Dennis Novak	3	2
(Croatia) Mate Pavić	2	7	6
7	(Italy) Flavio Cipolla	6	5	4

Qualifying competition
2	(Russia) Andrey Kuznetsov	6^{3}	6	7^{7}
(Croatia) Mate Pavić	7^{7}	3	6^{4}

==== Third qualifier ====
First round
3	(United Kingdom) Daniel Evans	6	7^{7}
(Slovakia) Adrian Sikora	3	6^{2}
(Slovakia) Karol Beck	6	4	6
(Czech Republic) Jan Hernych	2	6	1
(Slovakia) Ivo Klec	1	2
(Germany) Björn Phau	6	6
(Croatia) Nikola Mektić	3	7	5
6	(Italy) Matteo Viola	6	5	7

Second round
3	(United Kingdom) Daniel Evans	4	6	7
(Slovakia) Karol Beck	6	3	5
(Germany) Björn Phau	6	3	6
6	(Italy) Matteo Viola	4	6	3

Qualifying competition
3	(United Kingdom) Daniel Evans	3	4
(Germany) Björn Phau	6	6

==== Fourth qualifier ====
First round
4	(Germany) Michael Berrer	6	6
(Slovakia) Norbert Gombos	0	3
WC	(Croatia) Marin Draganja	1	1
(Czech Republic) Jaroslav Pospíšil	6	6
(Italy) Salvatore Caruso	6^{2}	3
WC	(Italy) Stefano Napolitano	7^{7}	6
WC	(Croatia) Mladen Mitak	3	2
5	(Italy) Marco Cecchinato	6	6

Second round
4	(Germany) Michael Berrer	6	6
(Czech Republic) Jaroslav Pospíšil	3	4
WC	(Italy) Stefano Napolitano	4	6^{5}
5	(Italy) Marco Cecchinato	6	7^{7}

Qualifying competition
4	(Germany) Michael Berrer	6	6
5	(Italy) Marco Cecchinato	2	2
