= 2011 PBZ Zagreb Indoors – Singles Qualifying =

This article displays the qualifying draw of the 2011 PBZ Zagreb Indoors.

== Players ==
=== Seeds ===
1. (Slovenia) Blaž Kavčič (qualified)
2. (Austria) Stefan Koubek (qualified)
3. (Kazakhstan) Evgeny Korolev (first round)
4. (United States) Alex Bogomolov Jr. (qualified)
5. (Hungary) Attila Balázs (qualifying competition)
6. (Belgium) Yannick Mertens (first round)
7. (France) Alexandre Sidorenko (qualifying competition)
8. (Sweden) Filip Prpic (first round)

=== Qualifiers ===
1. (Slovenia) Blaž Kavčič
2. (Austria) Stefan Koubek
3. (Serbia) Dušan Lajović
4. (United States) Alex Bogomolov Jr.

== Qualifying draw ==
=== First qualifier ===
First Round
1	(Slovenia) Blaž Kavčič	6	6
WC	(Bosnia and Herzegovina) Damir Džumhur	0	4
(Bosnia and Herzegovina) Tomislav Brkić	6	2	6
(Croatia) Ante Bilić	3	6	3
(Serbia) Boris Pašanski	6	6
WC	(Croatia) Tomislav Gregurović	0	1
(Croatia) Krešimir Ritz	1	2
7	(France) Alexandre Sidorenko	6	6

Second Round
1	(Slovenia) Blaž Kavčič	6	6
(Bosnia and Herzegovina) Tomislav Brkić	2	4
(Serbia) Boris Pašanski	5	6^{2}
7	(France) Alexandre Sidorenko	7	7

Qualifying Competition
1	(Slovenia) Blaž Kavčič	6	6
7	(France) Alexandre Sidorenko	3	3

=== Second qualifier ===
First Round
2	(Austria) Stefan Koubek	6	6
(Croatia) Ante Pavić	3	2
(Germany) Christopher Kas	6	6
(Croatia) Marko Lovrinović	3	2
(Montenegro) Goran Tošić	6	6
WC	(Croatia) Antun Pehar	3	0
(Croatia) Ivan Blažević	2	2
5	(Hungary) Attila Balázs	6	6

Second Round
2	(Austria) Stefan Koubek	6	6
(Germany) Christopher Kas	1	4
(Montenegro) Goran Tošić	6	3	3
5	(Hungary) Attila Balázs	3	6	6

Qualifying Competition
2	(Austria) Stefan Koubek	6	6
5	(Hungary) Attila Balázs	2	1

=== Third qualifier ===
First Round
3	(Kazakhstan) Evgeny Korolev	2	1
(Slovenia) Aljaž Bedene	6	6
(Croatia) Kristijan Mesaroš	7	3	6
(Croatia) Antonio Lupieri	6^{5}	6	1
(Croatia) Joško Topić	5	6	0
(Croatia) Marko Mijačević	7	1	6
(Serbia) Dušan Lajović	4	6	6
8	(Sweden) Filip Prpic	6	2	3

Second Round
(Slovenia) Aljaž Bedene	6	6
(Croatia) Kristijan Mesaroš	4	4
(Croatia) Marko Mijačević	2	2
(Serbia) Dušan Lajović	6	6

Qualifying Competition
(Slovenia) Aljaž Bedene	6^{4}	1
(Serbia) Dušan Lajović	7	6

=== Fourth qualifier ===
First Round
4	(United States) Alex Bogomolov, Jr.	4	6	6
WC	(Croatia) Dino Marcan	6	2	2
(Bosnia and Herzegovina) Mirza Bašić	6	6
(Hungary) György Balázs	2	4
(Croatia) Antonio Sančić	6^{7}	1
(Russia) Andrey Kumantsov	7	6
(Croatia) Roko Karanušić	7	6
6	(Belgium) Yannick Mertens	6^{5}	3

Second Round
4	(United States) Alex Bogomolov, Jr.	6	6
(Bosnia and Herzegovina) Mirza Bašić	3	4
(Russia) Andrey Kumantsov	6^{6}	3
(Croatia) Roko Karanušić	7	6

Qualifying Competition
4	(United States) Alex Bogomolov, Jr.	6	2	6
(Croatia) Roko Karanušić	1	6	4
