= 2011 PBZ Zagreb Indoors =

- Date: 30 January – 6 February
- Edition: 9th
- Category: ATP World Tour 250 series
- Draw: 28S / 16D
- Prize money: €450,000
- Surface: Hard / Indoor
- Location: Zagreb, Croatia
- Venue: Dom Sportova

Champions

Singles
- (Croatia) Ivan Dodig

Doubles
- (Belgium) Dick Norman / (Romania) Horia Tecău
- PBZ Zagreb Indoors

The 2011 PBZ Zagreb Indoors was an ATP men's tennis tournament played on hard courts indoors. It was the ninth overall edition of the PBZ Zagreb Indoors, and was part of the ATP World Tour 250 series of the 2011 ATP World Tour. It took place in Zagreb, Croatia from 30 January through 6 February 2011. Unseeded Ivan Dodig won the singles title.

== Finals ==
=== Singles ===
(Croatia) Ivan Dodig defeated (Germany) Michael Berrer, 6–3, 6–4

- It was Dodig's first career title.

=== Doubles ===
(Belgium) Dick Norman / (Romania) Horia Tecău defeated (Spain) Marcel Granollers / (Spain) Marc López, 6–3, 6–4

== ATP entrants ==
=== Seeds ===
Country	Player	Rank^{1}	Seed
CRO	Marin Čilić	14	1
CRO	Ivan Ljubičić	16	2
ESP	Guillermo García López	32	3
FRA	Richard Gasquet	33	4
GER	Florian Mayer	36	5
ESP	Marcel Granollers	42	6
GER	Philipp Petzschner	57	7
GER	Michael Berrer	61	8

- Rankings are as of January 17, 2011

=== Other entrants ===
The following players received wildcards into the singles main draw:

- (Croatia) Nikola Mektić
- (Croatia) Franko Škugor
- (Croatia) Antonio Veić

The following players received entry from the qualifying draw:

- (United States) Alex Bogomolov Jr.
- (Slovenia) Blaž Kavčič
- (Austria) Stefan Koubek
- (Serbia) Dušan Lajović
