= Michal Mertiňák =

Slovak tennis player (born 1979)

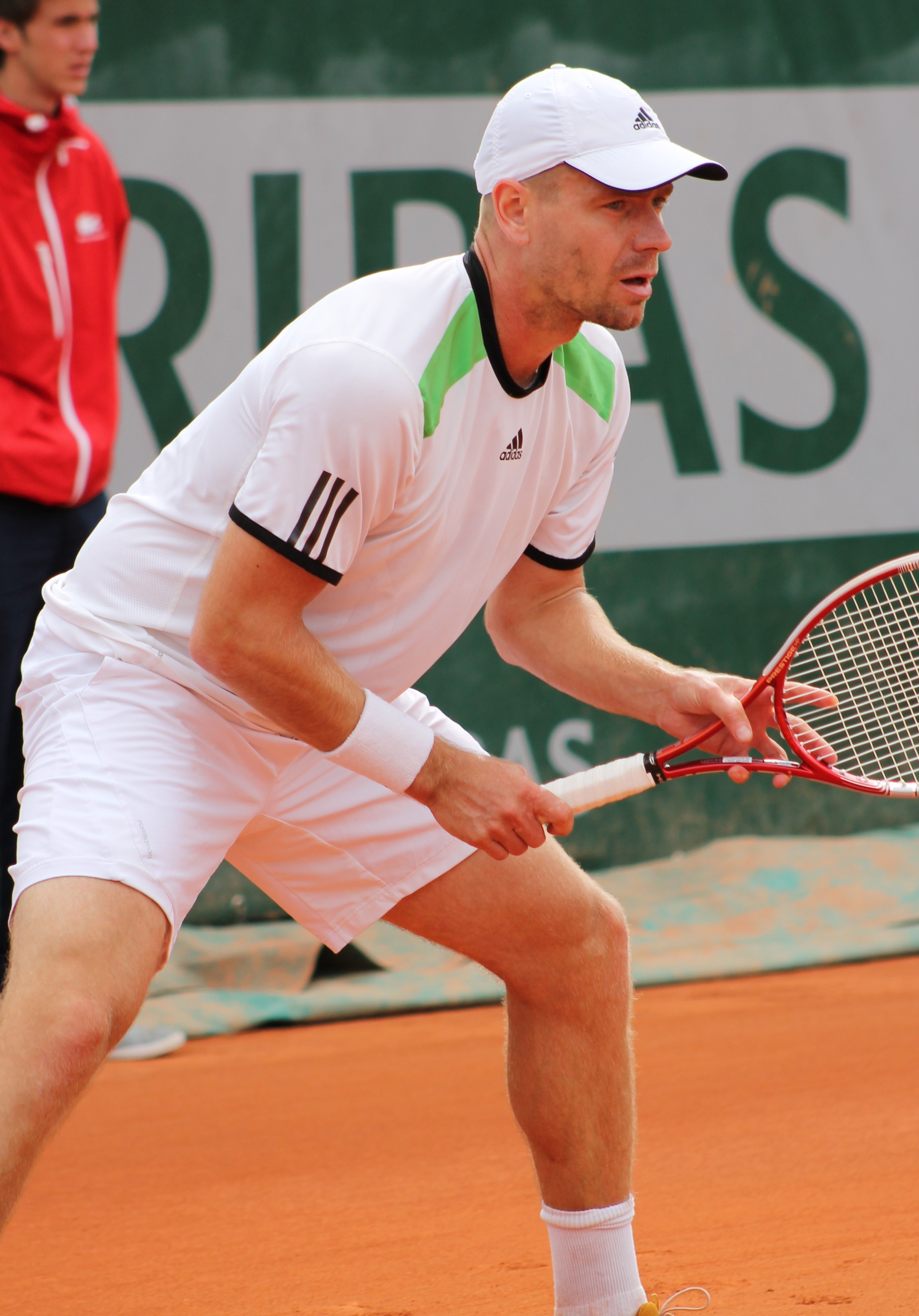
- Mertiňák in 2013
- Country (sports): Slovakia
- Residence: Bratislava, Slovakia
- Born: 11 October 1979 (age 45); Považská Bystrica, Czechoslovakia
- Height: 1.80 m (5 ft 11 in)
- Turned pro: 1999
- Plays: Right-handed (two-handed backhand)
- Prize money: US$1,511,590

Singles
- Career record: 10–16
- Career titles: 0
- Highest ranking: No. 129 (11 July 2005)

Grand Slam singles results
- Australian Open: Q3 (2007)
- French Open: Q2 (2007)
- Wimbledon: 1R (2003)
- US Open: Q3 (2003)

Doubles
- Career record: 208–172
- Career titles: 13
- Highest ranking: No. 12 (8 February 2010)

Grand Slam doubles results
- Australian Open: 2R (2006, 2007, 2009, 2011, 2012)
- French Open: 3R (2006, 2008, 2010)
- Wimbledon: QF (2005)
- US Open: 3R (2008, 2012)

Grand Slam mixed doubles results
- Australian Open: 1R (2010)
- French Open: QF (2011)
- Wimbledon: 2R (2009)
- US Open: 1R (2009, 2010)

Team competitions
- Davis Cup: F (2005)
- Last updated on: 4 February 2022.

Michal Mertiňák (born 11 October 1979) is a retired professional tennis player from Slovakia. He turned professional in 1999, and has won six doubles titles in his career on the ATP Tour. He reached his career high doubles ranking of World No. 12 in February 2010. He played in the 2005 Davis Cup for Slovakia, who finished runner-up to Croatia. Mertiňák played two ties in the final, including losing the deciding fifth rubber to Mario Ančić.

From 2009 until 2010 his doubles partner was Czech František Čermák. He won five tournaments with him in the 2009 season. Subsequently he partnered up with André Sá.

== Performance timelines ==
Key
| W | F | SF | QF | #R | RR | Q# | DNQ | A | NH |

(W) winner; (F) finalist; (SF) semifinalist; (QF) quarterfinalist; (#R) rounds 4, 3, 2, 1; (RR) round-robin stage; (Q#) qualification round; (DNQ) did not qualify; (A) absent; (NH) not held; (SR) strike rate (events won / competed); (W–L) win–loss record.

=== Singles ===
| Tournament | 2003 | 2004 | 2005 | 2006 | 2007 | 2008 | SR | W–L | Win% |
|---|---|---|---|---|---|---|---|---|---|
Grand Slam tournaments
| Australian Open | A | Q1 | Q1 | Q1 | Q3 | Q1 | 0 / 0 | 0–0 | – |
| French Open | A | Q1 | Q1 | Q1 | Q2 | A | 0 / 0 | 0–0 | – |
| Wimbledon | 1R | Q3 | Q2 | Q1 | Q1 | A | 0 / 1 | 0–1 | 0% |
| US Open | Q2 | A | Q3 | A | Q2 | A | 0 / 0 | 0–0 | – |
| Win–loss | 0–1 | 0–0 | 0–0 | 0–0 | 0–0 | 0–0 | 0 / 1 | 0–1 | 0% |
ATP World Tour Masters 1000
| Miami | A | A | A | Q2 | A | A | 0 / 0 | 0–0 | – |
| Win–loss | 0–0 | 0–0 | 0–0 | 0–0 | 0–0 | 0–0 | 0 / 0 | 0–0 | – |

=== Doubles ===
| Tournament | 2005 | 2006 | 2007 | 2008 | 2009 | 2010 | 2011 | 2012 | 2013 | 2014 | SR | W–L | Win% |
|---|---|---|---|---|---|---|---|---|---|---|---|---|---|
Grand Slam tournaments
| Australian Open | A | 2R | 2R | 1R | 2R | 1R | 2R | 2R | 1R | A | 0 / 8 | 5–8 | 38% |
| French Open | A | 3R | 2R | 3R | 2R | 3R | 1R | 1R | 2R | 1R | 0 / 9 | 9–9 | 50% |
| Wimbledon | QF | 2R | 1R | 1R | 2R | 2R | A | 1R | 2R | A | 0 / 8 | 7–8 | 47% |
| US Open | 2R | 1R | 2R | 3R | 2R | 1R | A | 3R | 1R | A | 0 / 8 | 7–8 | 47% |
| Win–loss | 4–2 | 4–4 | 3–4 | 4–4 | 4–4 | 3–4 | 1–2 | 3–4 | 2–4 | 0–1 | 0 / 33 | 28–33 | 46% |
Year-end Championships
| ATP Finals | Did not qualify | | | | SF | Did not qualify | | | | | 0 / 1 | 2–2 | 50% |
ATP World Tour Masters 1000
| Indian Wells Masters | A | A | A | A | 1R | QF | QF | A | A | A | 0 / 3 | 4–3 | 57% |
| Miami Open | A | 1R | A | A | QF | 2R | 2R | A | A | A | 0 / 4 | 4–4 | 50% |
| Monte Carlo Masters | A | A | A | A | A | 1R | 1R | A | A | A | 0 / 2 | 0–2 | 0% |
| Madrid Open | A | A | A | A | QF | 2R | 2R | A | A | A | 0 / 3 | 3–3 | 50% |
| Rome | A | A | A | A | A | 2R | 2R | A | A | A | 0 / 2 | 2–2 | 50% |
| Canadian Open | A | A | A | A | A | SF | A | A | A | A | 0 / 1 | 3–1 | 75% |
| Cincinnati Masters | A | A | A | A | 1R | QF | A | A | A | A | 0 / 2 | 2–2 | – |
| Shanghai Masters | Not Held | | | | QF | QF | A | A | A | A | 0 / 2 | 3–2 | 60% |
| Paris Masters | A | A | A | A | SF | SF | A | A | A | A | 0 / 2 | 4–2 | 67% |
| Win–loss | 0–0 | 0–1 | 0–0 | 0–0 | 8–6 | 12–9 | 5–5 | 0–0 | 0–0 | 0–0 | 0 / 21 | 25–21 | 54% |

=== Mixed doubles ===
| Tournament | 2006 | 2007 | 2008 | 2009 | 2010 | 2011 | 2012 | 2013 | SR | W–L | Win% |
|---|---|---|---|---|---|---|---|---|---|---|---|
Grand Slam tournaments
| Australian Open | A | A | A | A | 1R | A | A | A | 0 / 1 | 0–1 | 0% |
| French Open | A | A | A | A | 2R | QF | A | A | 0 / 2 | 3–2 | 60% |
| Wimbledon | 1R | A | A | 2R | 1R | A | A | 1R | 0 / 4 | 1–4 | 20% |
| US Open | A | A | A | 1R | 1R | A | A | A | 0 / 2 | 0–2 | 0% |
| Win–loss | 0–1 | 0–0 | 0–0 | 1–2 | 1–4 | 2–1 | 0–0 | 0–1 | 0 / 9 | 4–9 | 31% |

== ATP career finals ==
=== Doubles: 23 (13 titles, 10 runner-ups) ===
| Legend Grand Slam Tournaments (0–0) ATP World Tour Finals (0–0) ATP Masters Series (0–0) ATP Championship Series (3–0) ATP International Series (10–10) | Finals by surface Hard (4–4) Clay (8–6) Grass (0–0) Carpet (1–0) | Finals by setting Outdoors (9–6) Indoors (4–4) |

| Result | W–L | Date | Tournament | Tier | Surface | Partner | Opponents | Score |
|---|---|---|---|---|---|---|---|---|
| Win | 1–0 | Jan 2006 | Chennai, India | International Series | Hard | (Czech Republic) Petr Pála | (India) Prakash Amritraj (India) Rohan Bopanna | 6–2, 7–5 |
| Win | 2–0 | Jan 2006 | Zagreb, Croatia | International Series | Carpet | (Czech Republic) Jaroslav Levinský | (Italy) Davide Sanguinetti (Italy) Andreas Seppi | 7–6^{(9–7)}, 6–1 |
| Win | 3–0 | Jul 2007 | Umag, Croatia | International Series | Clay | (Czech Republic) Lukáš Dlouhý | (Czech Republic) Jaroslav Levinský (Czech Republic) David Škoch | 6–1, 6–1 |
| Win | 4–0 | Sep 2007 | Bucharest, Romania | International Series | Clay | (Austria) Oliver Marach | (Argentina) Martín García (Argentina) Sebastián Prieto | 7–6^{(7–2)}, 7–6^{(10–8)} |
| Win | 5–0 | Mar 2008 | Acapulco, Mexico | Championship Series | Clay | (Austria) Oliver Marach | (Argentina) Agustín Calleri (Peru) Luis Horna | 6–2, 6–7^{(3–7)}, [10–7] |
| Win | 6–0 | Jul 2008 | Umag, Croatia | International Series | Clay | (Czech Republic) Petr Pála | (Italy) Fabio Fognini (Argentina) Carlos Berlocq | 2–6, 6–3, [10–5] |
| Win | 7–0 | Feb 2009 | Acapulco, Mexico | 500 Series | Clay | (Czech Republic) František Čermák | (Poland) Łukasz Kubot (Austria) Oliver Marach | 4–6, 6–4, [10–7] |
| Win | 8–0 | Jul 2009 | Stuttgart, Germany | 250 Series | Clay | (Czech Republic) František Čermák | (Romania) Victor Hănescu (Romania) Horia Tecău | 7–5, 6–4 |
| Win | 9–0 | Aug 2009 | Umag, Croatia | 250 Series | Clay | (Czech Republic) František Čermák | (Sweden) Johan Brunström (Netherlands Antilles) Jean-Julien Rojer | 6–4, 6–4 |
| Win | 10–0 | Sep 2009 | Bucharest, Romania | 250 Series | Clay | (Czech Republic) František Čermák | (Sweden) Johan Brunström (Netherlands Antilles) Jean-Julien Rojer | 6–2, 6–4 |
| Loss | 10–1 | Oct 2009 | Moscow, Russia | 250 Series | Hard | (Czech Republic) František Čermák | (Uruguay) Pablo Cuevas (Spain) Marcel Granollers | 4–6, 7–5, [10–8] |
| Win | 11–1 | Nov 2009 | Valencia, Spain | 500 Series | Hard | (Czech Republic) František Čermák | (Spain) Marcel Granollers (Spain) Tommy Robredo | 6–4, 6–3 |
| Loss | 11–2 | Jan 2010 | Doha, Qatar | 250 Series | Hard | (Czech Republic) František Čermák | (Spain) Guillermo García López (Spain) Albert Montañés | 6–4, 7–5 |
| Loss | 11–3 | Aug 2010 | Umag, Croatia | 250 Series | Clay | (Czech Republic) František Čermák | (Czech Republic) Leoš Friedl (Slovakia) Filip Polášek | 6–3, 7–6^{(9–7)} |
| Win | 12–3 | Oct 2010 | Kuala Lumpur, Malaysia | 250 Series | Hard | (Czech Republic) František Čermák | (Poland) Mariusz Fyrstenberg (Poland) Marcin Matkowski | 7–6^{(7–3)}, 7–6^{(7–5)} |
| Loss | 12–4 | Feb 2012 | São Paulo, Brazil | 250 Series | Clay | (Brazil) André Sá | (United States) Eric Butorac (Brazil) Bruno Soares | 6–3, 4–6, [8–10] |
| Loss | 12–5 | Feb 2012 | Buenos Aires, Argentina | 250 Series | Clay | (Brazil) André Sá | (Spain) David Marrero (Spain) Fernando Verdasco | 4–6, 4–6 |
| Loss | 12–6 | Mar 2012 | Delray Beach, United States | 250 Series | Hard | (Brazil) André Sá | (United Kingdom) Colin Fleming (United Kingdom) Ross Hutchins | 6–2, 6–7^{(5–7)}, [13–15] |
| Loss | 12–7 | Jul 2012 | Stuttgart, Germany | 250 Series | Clay | (Brazil) André Sá | (France) Jérémy Chardy (Poland) Łukasz Kubot | 1–6, 3–6 |
| Win | 13–7 | Oct 2012 | Moscow, Russia | 250 Series | Hard | (Czech Republic) František Čermák | (Italy) Simone Bolelli (Italy) Daniele Bracciali | 7–5, 6–3 |
| Loss | 13–8 | Feb 2013 | São Paulo, Brazil | 250 Series | Clay | (Czech Republic) František Čermák | (Austria) Alexander Peya (Brazil) Bruno Soares | 7–6^{(7–5)}, 2–6, [7–10] |
| Loss | 13–9 | Feb 2014 | Zagreb, Croatia | 250 Series | Hard | (Germany) Philipp Marx | (Netherlands) Jean-Julien Rojer (Romania) Horia Tecău | 6–3, 4–6, [2–10] |
| Loss | 13–10 | Jul 2014 | Gstaad, Switzerland | 250 Series | Clay | (Australia) Rameez Junaid | (Germany) Andre Begemann (Netherlands) Robin Haase | 3–6, 4–6 |

== ATP Challenger and ITF Futures finals ==
=== Singles: 14 (6–8) ===
| Legend ATP Challenger (2–4) ITF Futures (4–4) | Finals by surface Hard (2–2) Clay (4–5) Grass (0–1) Carpet (0–0) |

| Result | W–L | Date | Tournament | Tier | Surface | Opponent | Score |
|---|---|---|---|---|---|---|---|
| Loss | 0–1 | Jul 2000 | Egypt F1, Cairo | Futures | Clay | (Egypt) Amr Ghoneim | 5–7, 2–6 |
| Loss | 0–2 | Aug 2000 | Egypt F2, Cairo | Futures | Clay | (Egypt) Hisham Hemeda | 6–7^{(4–7)}, 6–3, 3–6 |
| Loss | 0–3 | Oct 2000 | Uzbekistan F3, Guliston | Futures | Hard | (Belarus) Alexander Shvets | 7–6^{(12–10)}, 1–6, 4–6 |
| Win | 1–3 | Jun 2001 | Hungary F1, Sopron | Futures | Clay | (Austria) Andreas Fasching | 6–3, 6–2 |
| Win | 2–3 | Jun 2002 | Czech Republic F3, Karlovy Vary | Futures | Clay | (Czech Republic) Radim Zitko | walkover |
| Win | 3–3 | Feb 2003 | Portugal F3, Espinho | Futures | Clay | (Spain) Roberto Menendez Ferre | 6–1, 6–1 |
| Loss | 3–4 | Mar 2003 | Portugal F6, Carcavelos | Futures | Clay | (Spain) Nicolás Almagro | 1–6, 0–6 |
| Win | 4–4 | May 2003 | Hungary F2, Hódmezővásárhely | Futures | Clay | (Italy) Leonardo Azzaro | 7–6^{(8–6)}, 7–6^{(7–1)} |
| Loss | 4–5 | Aug 2003 | St. Petersburg, Russia | Challenger | Clay | (Germany) Florian Mayer | 6–4, 6–7^{(3–7)}, 1–6 |
| Loss | 4–6 | Aug 2003 | Saransk, Russia | Challenger | Clay | (Czech Republic) Martin Štěpánek | 1–6, 1–6 |
| Loss | 4–7 | Jul 2004 | Manchester, United Kingdom | Challenger | Grass | (United Kingdom) Alex Bogdanovic | 1–6, 3–6 |
| Win | 5–7 | Aug 2004 | Bukhara, Uzbekistan | Challenger | Hard | (Russia) Teymuraz Gabashvili | 3–6, 6–4, 6–3 |
| Loss | 5–8 | Mar 2005 | Sarajevo, Bosnia & Herzegovina | Challenger | Hard | (Belarus) Vladimir Voltchkov | 6–7^{(1–7)}, 3–6 |
| Win | 6–8 | Nov 2006 | Bratislava, Slovakia | Challenger | Hard | (Czech Republic) Lukáš Dlouhý | 7–6^{(7–4)}, 6–4 |

=== Doubles: 41 (19–22) ===
| Legend ATP Challenger (12–12) ITF Futures (7–10) | Finals by surface Hard (9–9) Clay (8–13) Grass (0–0) Carpet (2–0) |

| Result | W–L | Date | Tournament | Tier | Surface | Partner | Opponents | Score |
|---|---|---|---|---|---|---|---|---|
| Win | 1–0 | Jul 2000 | Egypt F1, Cairo | Futures | Clay | (Slovakia) Tomas Janci | (Egypt) Amr Ghoneim (Egypt) Karim Maamoun | 6–3, 7–5 |
| Loss | 1–1 | Aug 2000 | Egypt F2, Cairo | Futures | Clay | (Slovakia) Tomas Janci | (Egypt) Amr Ghoneim (Egypt) Karim Maamoun | 6–3, 2–6, 3–6 |
| Win | 2–1 | Nov 2000 | India F5, Chandigarh | Futures | Hard | (Slovakia) Tomas Janci | (Slovakia) Branislav Sekáč (Slovakia) Viktor Bruthans | 6–4, 6–1 |
| Loss | 2–2 | Feb 2001 | Croatia F1, Zagreb | Futures | Hard | (Slovakia) Tomas Janci | (Slovenia) Andrej Kračman (Slovenia) Borut Urh | 6–4, 4–6, 2–6 |
| Loss | 2–3 | May 2001 | Slovakia F1, Levice | Futures | Clay | (Slovakia) Tomas Janci | (Czech Republic) Petr Dezort (Czech Republic) Radomír Vašek | walkover |
| Loss | 2–4 | May 2001 | Slovakia F3, Trnava | Futures | Clay | (Slovakia) Tomas Janci | (Poland) Bartlomiej Dabrowski (Poland) Mariusz Fyrstenberg | 4–6, 4–6 |
| Loss | 2–5 | Jun 2001 | Hungary F1, Sopron | Futures | Clay | (Slovakia) Branislav Sekáč | (Hungary) Kornél Bardóczky (Hungary) Zoltán Nagy | 6–7^{(3–7)}, 3–6 |
| Loss | 2–6 | Apr 2002 | Greece F1, Syros | Futures | Hard | (Slovakia) Karol Beck | (France) Thierry Ascione (France) Florent Serra | 6–3, 4–6, 2–6 |
| Win | 3–6 | Apr 2002 | Greece F2, Kalamata | Futures | Hard | (Slovakia) Karol Beck | (Finland) Tapio Nurminen (Slovenia) Marko Tkalec | 6–1, 6–2 |
| Loss | 3–7 | May 2002 | Poland F1, Wrocław | Futures | Clay | (Slovakia) Tomas Janci | (Finland) Lauri Kiiski (Finland) Tero Vilen | 0–6, 3–6 |
| Loss | 3–8 | Jun 2002 | Slovakia F1A, Košice | Futures | Clay | (Slovakia) Frantisek Babej | (Slovakia) Juraj Hasko (Slovakia) Igor Zelenay | 6–3, 4–6, 3–6 |
| Win | 4–8 | Aug 2002 | Austria F4, Seefeld | Futures | Clay | (Slovakia) David Sebok | (Czech Republic) Jiri Folber (Czech Republic) David Miketa | 6–4, 6–3 |
| Loss | 4–9 | Oct 2002 | Jamaica F17, Negril | Futures | Hard | (Socialist Federal Republic of Yugoslavia) Darko Madjarovski | (France) Cedric Kauffmann (United Kingdom) Miles Maclagan | 3–6, 7–6^{(7–4)}, 6–7^{(2–7)} |
| Win | 5–9 | Jan 2003 | Germany F1C, Munich | Futures | Carpet | (Slovakia) Igor Zelenay | (Germany) Daniel Elsner (Germany) Philipp Petzschner | 4–6, 7–6^{(20–18)}, 7–6^{(7–5)} |
| Loss | 5–10 | Feb 2003 | Portugal F1, Espinho | Futures | Clay | (Austria) Marco Mirnegg | (Germany) Christopher Kas (Luxembourg) Mike Scheidweiler | 3–6, 2–6 |
| Win | 6–10 | Feb 2003 | Portugal F2, Espinho | Futures | Clay | (Austria) Marco Mirnegg | (Hungary) Kornél Bardóczky (Hungary) Gergely Kisgyörgy | 7–5, 4–6, 6–3 |
| Win | 7–10 | Feb 2003 | Portugal F3, Espinho | Futures | Clay | (Austria) Marco Mirnegg | (Hungary) Kornél Bardóczky (Hungary) Gergely Kisgyörgy | 6–4, 6–4 |
| Loss | 7–11 | Oct 2003 | Tumkur, India | Challenger | Hard | (Slovakia) Branislav Sekáč | (India) Prakash Amritraj (South Africa) Rik de Voest | 4–6, 3–6 |
| Win | 8–11 | Oct 2003 | Belgaum, India | Challenger | Hard | (Slovakia) Branislav Sekáč | (India) Mustafa Ghouse (India) Vishal Uppal | 7–6^{(7–3)}, 7–6^{(7–2)} |
| Win | 9–11 | Feb 2004 | Cherbourg, France | Challenger | Hard | (Germany) Alexander Waske | (Japan) Jun Kato (Spain) Emilio Benfele Álvarez | 6–4, 7–6^{(7–1)} |
| Win | 10–11 | Aug 2004 | Bukhara, Uzbekistan | Challenger | Hard | (Czech Republic) Pavel Šnobel | (Netherlands) Paul Logtens (Netherlands) Melle van Gemerden | 6–4, 6–2 |
| Win | 11–11 | Jan 2005 | Heilbronn, Germany | Challenger | Carpet | (France) Sébastien de Chaunac | (Belgium) Gilles Elseneer (Luxembourg) Gilles Müller | 6–2, 3–6, 6–3 |
| Loss | 11–12 | Feb 2005 | Besançon, France | Challenger | Hard | (Switzerland) Jean-Claude Scherrer | (United States) Jason Marshall (United States) Huntley Montgomery | 7–6^{(9–7)}, 2–6, 3–6 |
| Win | 12–12 | Mar 2005 | Sarajevo, Bosnia & Herzegovina | Challenger | Hard | (Ukraine) Sergiy Stakhovsky | (Czech Republic) Lukáš Dlouhý (Czech Republic) Jan Vacek | 6–7^{(8–10)}, 6–2, 6–2 |
| Loss | 12–13 | Mar 2005 | Saint-Brieuc, France | Challenger | Clay | (Czech Republic) Jan Vacek | (Romania) Victor Ioniță (Romania) Gabriel Moraru | 1–6, 4–6 |
| Loss | 12–14 | Nov 2005 | Bratislava, Slovakia | Challenger | Hard | (Slovakia) Dominik Hrbatý | (Switzerland) Jean-Claude Scherrer (South Africa) Chris Haggard | 3–6, 6–2, 6–7^{(4–7)} |
| Win | 13–14 | May 2006 | Dresden, Germany | Challenger | Clay | (Switzerland) Yves Allegro | (Germany) Christopher Kas (Germany) Philipp Petzschner | 6–3, 6–0 |
| Win | 14–14 | May 2006 | Zagreb, Croatia | Challenger | Clay | (Switzerland) Yves Allegro | (France) Julien Jeanpierre (France) Nicolas Renavand | 6–1, 6–2 |
| Loss | 14–15 | Feb 2007 | Wrocław, Poland | Challenger | Hard | (Switzerland) Jean-Claude Scherrer | (Czech Republic) Lukáš Rosol (Czech Republic) Jan Vacek | 5–7, 6–7^{(4–7)} |
| Win | 15–15 | Mar 2007 | Cherbourg, France | Challenger | Hard | (Czech Republic) Robin Vik | (Poland) Łukasz Kubot (Belgium) Dick Norman | 6–2, 6–4 |
| Loss | 15–16 | Apr 2007 | Casablanca, Morocco | Challenger | Clay | (Czech Republic) Robin Vik | (Poland) Łukasz Kubot (Austria) Oliver Marach | 3–6, 3–6 |
| Loss | 15–17 | Apr 2007 | Marrakech, Morocco | Challenger | Clay | (Czech Republic) Leoš Friedl | (Czech Republic) Tomáš Cibulec (Australia) Jordan Kerr | 2–6, 4–6 |
| Loss | 15–18 | Mar 2008 | Barletta, Italy | Challenger | Clay | (Austria) Oliver Marach | (Italy) Flavio Cipolla (Spain) Marcel Granollers | 3–6, 6–2, [9–11] |
| Loss | 15–19 | Sep 2008 | Trnava, Slovakia | Challenger | Clay | (Austria) Daniel Köllerer | (Slovakia) Igor Zelenay (Czech Republic) David Škoch | 3–6, 1–6 |
| Win | 16–19 | Oct 2008 | Mons, Belgium | Challenger | Hard | (Croatia) Lovro Zovko | (Switzerland) Yves Allegro (Romania) Horia Tecău | 7–5, 6–3 |
| Loss | 16–20 | Nov 2011 | Helsinki, Finland | Challenger | Hard | (United States) James Cerretani | (Germany) Martin Emmrich (Sweden) Andreas Siljeström | 4–6, 4–6 |
| Loss | 16–21 | Mar 2012 | Sarajevo, Bosnia & Herzegovina | Challenger | Hard | (Slovakia) Igor Zelenay | (Germany) Dustin Brown (United Kingdom) Jonathan Marray | 6–7^{(2–7)}, 6–2, [9–11] |
| Win | 17–21 | Aug 2012 | San Marino, San Marino | Challenger | Clay | (Czech Republic) Lukáš Dlouhý | (Italy) Stefano Ianni (Italy) Matteo Viola | 2–6, 7–6^{(7–3)}, [11–9] |
| Win | 18–21 | Aug 2012 | Cordenons, Italy | Challenger | Clay | (Czech Republic) Lukáš Dlouhý | (Germany) Philipp Marx (Romania) Florin Mergea | 5–7, 7–5, [10–7] |
| Win | 19–21 | Feb 2014 | Bergamo, Italy | Challenger | Hard | (Slovakia) Karol Beck | (Russia) Konstantin Kravchuk (Ukraine) Denys Molchanov | 4–6, 7–5, [10–6] |
| Loss | 19–22 | Jul 2014 | Braunschweig, Germany | Challenger | Clay | (Australia) Rameez Junaid | (Sweden) Andreas Siljeström (Slovakia) Igor Zelenay | 5–7, 4–6 |
