= Mate Pavić =

Croatian tennis player (born 1993)

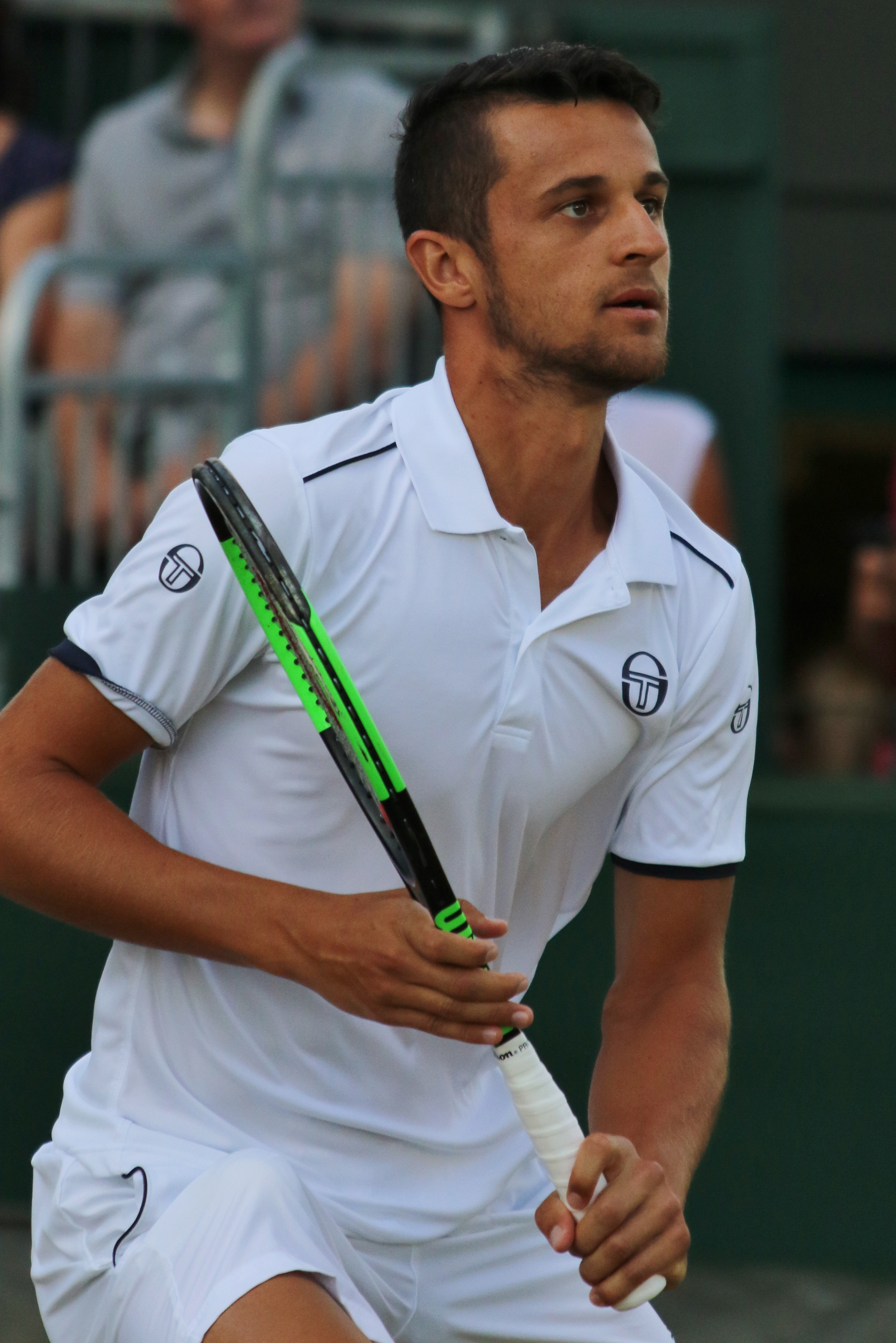
- Pavić at the 2017 Wimbledon Championships
- Country (sports): Croatia
- Residence: Freeport, The Bahamas
- Born: 4 July 1993 (age 33) Split, Croatia
- Height: 1.91 m (6 ft 3 in)
- Turned pro: 2011
- Plays: Left-handed (two-handed backhand)
- Coach: Nadja Pavić
- Prize money: $8,186,546

Singles
- Career record: 3–10
- Career titles: 0
- Highest ranking: No. 295 (6 May 2023)

Doubles
- Career record: 512–252
- Career titles: 43
- Highest ranking: No. 1 (21 May 2018)
- Current ranking: No. 7 (10 November 2025)

Grand Slam doubles results
- Australian Open: W (2018)
- French Open: W (2024)
- Wimbledon: W (2021)
- US Open: W (2020)

Other doubles tournaments
- Tour Finals: F (2022, 2024, 2026)
- Olympic Games: W (2021)

Mixed doubles
- Career titles: 3

Grand Slam mixed doubles results
- Australian Open: W (2018)
- French Open: F (2018, 2019)
- Wimbledon: W (2023)
- US Open: W (2016)

Team competitions
- Davis Cup: W (2018)
Medal record
Representing Croatia
Olympic Games
Gold medal – first place	2020 Tokyo	Men's doubles
- Last updated on: 1 December 2025.

Mate Pavić (pronounced [mǎːte pǎːvitɕ]; born 4 July 1993) is a Croatian professional tennis player. He is a former ATP world No. 1 in doubles. Pavić is one of only six men to complete the Career Golden Slam in doubles.

He is a seven-time Grand Slam champion, having won four titles in men's doubles: the 2018 Australian Open with Oliver Marach, the 2020 US Open with Bruno Soares, the 2021 Wimbledon Championships with Nikola Mektić, and the 2024 French Open with Marcelo Arévalo. Pavić also won mixed doubles titles at the 2016 US Open with Laura Siegemund, the 2018 Australian Open with Gabriela Dabrowski, and the 2023 Wimbledon Championships with Lyudmyla Kichenok. He finished runner-up at the 2017 Wimbledon Championships, the 2018 French Open, the 2020 French Open, and the 2022 Wimbledon Championships in men's doubles, and at the 2018 and 2019 French Opens in mixed doubles.

Pavić has won 43 doubles titles on the ATP Tour, including nine at Masters 1000 level. In May 2018, he became world No. 1 in doubles, making him the 52nd player in history to hold the top ranking. He was the youngest doubles No. 1 since Todd Woodbridge in 1996, and the first player from Croatia, male or female, to be world No. 1 in singles or doubles. Pavić was part of the winning Croatian team at the 2018 Davis Cup, and also won Olympic gold in men's doubles at the 2020 Summer Olympics alongside Mektić. In singles, he reached a career-high ranking of No. 295 in May 2013.

== Early and personal life ==
Pavić was born in Split, Croatia, to Jakov, a tennis coach, and Snježana, a kindergarten teacher. He has two sisters, Nadja and Matea. He started playing tennis at the age of 5, after watching his father coach his sister Nadja, who is currently his coach.

== Career ==
=== Juniors ===
As a junior, Pavić posted a singles win–loss record of 95–51 (90–39 in doubles) and reached a combined ranking of No. 5 in January 2011. In singles, in 2010 he reached the French Open QF and in 2011 again the QF, this time at the Wimbledon Championship. His biggest success as a junior came at the 2011 Wimbledon Championships – Boys' doubles where he won the title partnering George Morgan (UK).

=== Early career ===
After winning the Boys' Doubles title at Wimbledon Championship, Pavić received a wild card to the 2012 Zagreb Indoors doubles tournament. Partnering Ivan Dodig, he reached his first ATP doubles finals at the age of 18 years and 7 months. In singles, his first ATP-level tour match came at the 2011 ATP Croatia Open in Umag, where he lost to Filippo Volandri in the first round. His first victory at the ATP-tour level came at 2012 Rosmalen Grass Court Championships in s-Hertogenbosch where he upset world No. 40 Robin Haase in the first round. The same year he defeated world No 37. Juan Carlos Ferrero. The following year he reached his career high ranking in singles at world No. 295.

Pavić wanted to pursue his tennis career in both singles and doubles, but when doubles qualifying events were introduced in 2016, this new rule enabled him to get into bigger ATP doubles tournaments and decided to focus more on doubles. He is quoted saying he regrets not being able to see where his singles career would have taken him.

=== 2015–2017: First title, major mixed title ===
Pavić won his first ATP doubles title at ATP Nice Open in May 2015, partnering Michael Venus. From May 2015 to October 2016 Pavić and Venus made it to 11 ATP doubles finals, winning five of them. Unfortunately, they never made it past 3rd round at a Grand Slam tournament and decide to split at the end of 2016. However, at the 2016 US Open, Pavić would win the mixed doubles title with Laura Siegemund, his first grand slam title.

Not being able to secure a permanent partner after the 2017 Miami Open, Pavić temporarily teamed with Austria's doubles veteran Oliver Marach during the European clay court season. Their clay swing was not successful and they decided that they would at the end of the grass court season. However, Pavić and Marach then made it to three consecutive grass court finals, including the 2017 Wimbledon Championship where they lost 11–13 in the fifth set to the No.4-seeds doubles team of Łukasz Kubot and Marcelo Melo.

Despite losing all three grass court finals, Pavić and Marach would play US Open, where they would lose in the third round. In October, Pavić and Marach won their first tournament as a team at the Stockholm Open. In November they qualified for the 2017 ATP Finals as first alternates and played one match, beating the Bryan brothers in Round robin. Pavić finished the season at no. 17

=== 2018: Major doubles and mixed titles, No. 1 ===
Pavić and Marach had a great start to 2018. They went on to win 17 matches in a row, capturing titles at the Qatar Open, Auckland Open and then winning their first Grand Slam title at the 2018 Australian Open. In Melbourne, Mate also won his second mixed doubles Grand Slam title, this time with Gabriela Dabrowski. Pavić and Marach's winning streak came to an end at the Rotterdam Open in February, where they lost in the final. In April, Pavić and Marach reached their first ATP 1000 Masters Series finals in Monte Carlo (losing to Bryan brothers).

On 21 May 2018, Pavić became the No. 1 ranked player in the world in doubles, and spent 8 weeks at the top. He was the youngest No. 1 doubles player in the world since Todd Woodbridge in 1996. Pavić and Marach also made it to the 2018 French Open final, where they lost to Mahut and Herbert. After the French Open, Pavić and Marach went 10–8, losing in both 2018 Wimbledon Championship and 2018 US Open first rounds. They bounced back by reaching the China Open final in October (l. to Kubot and Melo). Pavić finished the 2018 season at No. 3.

=== 2019–2020: US Open title, year-end No. 1 ===
After the 2019 French Open, Marach and Pavić terminated their partnership and Mate teamed with Bruno Soares and won his first Masters title at 2019 Shanghai Rolex Masters in October. The same month they reached the final of Stockholm Open, and Pavić briefly returned to top 10 rankings, but finished the 2019 season ranked 18th in the world.

In September 2020 Pavić and Soares won the 2020 US Open tournament. It was the second men's doubles Grand Slam title of Pavić's career. They followed it with a run to the 2020 French Open and 2020 Rolex Paris Masters finals where they lost after having 5 match points. The pair finished No. 1 in the 2020 doubles race.

=== 2021: Wimbledon title, Croatian Olympic gold ===
Starting 2021 Pavić partnered successfully with his compatriot Nikola Mektić. They won four ATP titles including the doubles title at the 2021 Miami Open in April and reached the 2021 Australian Open doubles semifinals and 2021 Dubai Tennis Championships final in the first three months of the year. Following these results, Pavić returned to the No. 1 ranking in doubles on April 5. On April 18, Pavić clinched his fifth overall and second ATP Masters title of the year at the 2021 Monte-Carlo Masters, along with retaining the No. 1 ranking, as he was in contention with Robert Farah for it, who lost in the semifinals at the event. Seeded No. 2 the pair also reached the final at the 2021 Mutua Madrid Open Masters where they lost to the No. 3 seeded pair of Horacio Zeballos and Marcel Granollers and the final of the 2021 Italian Open where they won the title defeating No. 5 seeded pair Rajeev Ram and Joe Salisbury.

In their first Grand Slam doubles final, top seeds Pavic and Mektić had the biggest victory of their 2021 season as a team defeating Granollers and Zeballos to triumph in doubles at the 2021 Wimbledon Championships. They became the first Croatian players to win the Wimbledon men's doubles title. They are also the first players from their country to win at the All England Club since Goran Ivanišević's 2001 victory in singles and Ivan Dodig's 2019 mixed doubles win with Latisha Chan.

At the Olympics he won the gold medal with Mektić in an all-Croatian final defeating Ivan Dodig and Marin Čilić. It was the country's first gold medal in the sport and the third time in the Olympics men's doubles' history that the same country won both gold and silver, and the first one since 1908.

=== 2022: Italian champion, Wimbledon final ===
Pavić and Mektić won their second Italian Open Masters crown and defended their 2021 title.

In the following week, the Croatian pairing won the 2022 Geneva Open, which was Pavić's 28th doubles title and 30th overall (including the two mixed titles).

In June, Pavić won the Stuttgart Open with Hubert Hurkacz overcoming Tim Pütz and Michael Venus for his 350th win. In the following week at the ATP 500 2022 Queen's Club Championships, Pavić won his third title for the season in partnership with Mektic and twelfth overall for the pair. The pair also successfully defended their title at the 2022 Eastbourne International, which was Pavić's third consecutive title win.

At the 2022 Wimbledon Championships the Croatian pair reached the semifinals in straight sets and the final defeating six seeded Columbian pair of Robert Farah and Juan Sebastián Cabal in a five sets with a fifth set super tiebreak over 4 hours match.

The pair won another ATP 500 title at the 2022 Astana Open making it fifth as a team and sixth overall for the season for Pavic.

=== 2023: Wimbledon mixed title ===
He won his 35th overall and third straight title at the 2023 Eastbourne International with partner Mektic.

Pavic and Lyudmyla Kichenok won the mixed doubles title at the 2023 Wimbledon Championships defeating Joran Vliegen and Yifan Xu. In doubles, he recorded his 400th career win defeating Francisco Cabral and Rafael Matos in straight sets in the second round at the All England Club.

=== 2024: Career Golden Slam, back to World No. 1 ===
Partnering Marcelo Arévalo, Pavić defeated Simone Bolelli and Andrea Vavassori in the final, 7–5, 6–3 to win the title at the 2024 French Open. It was Pavić's fourth Major doubles title and Arévalo's second. Pavić completed a career Golden Slam with the win, having previously won the three other Grand Slams and an Olympic gold medal.

At the 2024 Cincinnati Open he won his sixth Masters title with Marcelo Arévalo, defeating Alex Michelsen and Mackenzie McDonald. On 28 August 2024, Pavić and Arévalo became the first doubles team to qualify for the 2024 ATP Finals. Pavić became a five-time qualifier with four different partners (Oliver Marach, Bruno Soares, Nikola Mektic and Arévalo). He was also an alternate in 2017 with Marach.

On 11 November 2024, he returned to world No. 1 player in doubles jointly with his partner Marcelo Arévalo. The duo also clinched the year-end ATP No. 1 doubles team ranking. They reached the final with a straight set defeat over Harri Heliovaara and Henry Patten. They lost to the German duo Kevin Krawietz and Tim Pütz in the final. Pavić was attempting to become the sixth man to complete the Career Super Slam in doubles.

=== 2025: Sunshine Double champion, 500 wins ===
Marcelo Arévalo and Mate Pavić won the Indian Wells Masters becoming the first World No. 1 pair to accomplish the feat since the Bryan Brothers in 2014, defeating Sebastian Korda and Jordan Thompson. They won the next Sunshine Double Masters in Miami and became only the sixth team in history to accomplish the feat.

At Wimbledon, Pavic recorded his 500th tour-level win after reaching the semifinals with Marcelo Arevalo.

=== 2026: Queen's Club title ===
In June at the Queen's Club Championships, Arévalo and Pavić won the title, defeating top seeds Harri Heliövaara and Henry Patten in the final. The two pairs met again in the final at Wimbledon but this time it was Patten and Heliovaara who came out on top in straight sets.

== Grand Slam tournament finals ==
=== Doubles: 9 (4 titles, 5 runner-ups) ===
Result	Year	Championship	Surface	Partner	Opponents	Score
Loss	2017	Wimbledon	Grass	(Austria) Oliver Marach	(Poland) Łukasz Kubot (Brazil) Marcelo Melo	7–5, 5–7, 6–7^{(2–7)}, 6–3, 11–13
Win	2018	Australian Open	Hard	(Austria) Oliver Marach	(Colombia) Juan Sebastián Cabal (Colombia) Robert Farah	6–4, 6–4
Loss	2018	French Open	Clay	(Austria) Oliver Marach	(France) Pierre-Hugues Herbert (France) Nicolas Mahut	2–6, 6–7^{(4–7)}
Win	2020	US Open	Hard	(Brazil) Bruno Soares	(Netherlands) Wesley Koolhof (Croatia) Nikola Mektić	7–5, 6–3
Loss	2020	French Open	Clay	(Brazil) Bruno Soares	(Germany) Kevin Krawietz (Germany) Andreas Mies	3–6, 5–7
Win	2021	Wimbledon	Grass	(Croatia) Nikola Mektić	(Spain) Marcel Granollers (Argentina) Horacio Zeballos	6–4, 7–6^{(7–5)}, 2–6, 7–5
Loss	2022	Wimbledon	Grass	(Croatia) Nikola Mektić	(Australia) Matthew Ebden (Australia) Max Purcell	6–7^{(5–7)}, 7–6^{(7–3)}, 6–4, 4–6, 6–7^{(2–10)}
Win	2024	French Open	Clay	(El Salvador) Marcelo Arévalo	(Italy) Simone Bolelli (Italy) Andrea Vavassori	7–5, 6–3
Loss	2026	Wimbledon	Grass	(El Salvador) Marcelo Arévalo	(Finland) Harri Heliövaara (United Kingdom) Henry Patten	6–7^{(4–7)}, 6–7^{(3–7)}

=== Mixed doubles: 5 (3 titles, 2 runner-ups) ===
Result	Year	Championship	Surface	Partner	Opponents	Score
Win	2016	US Open	Hard	(Germany) Laura Siegemund	(United States) CoCo Vandeweghe (United States) Rajeev Ram	6–4, 6–4
Win	2018	Australian Open	Hard	(Canada) Gabriela Dabrowski	(Hungary) Tímea Babos (India) Rohan Bopanna	2–6, 6–4, [11–9]
Loss	2018	French Open	Clay	(Canada) Gabriela Dabrowski	(Chinese Taipei) Latisha Chan (Croatia) Ivan Dodig	1–6, 7–6^{(7–5)}, [8–10]
Loss	2019	French Open	Clay	(Canada) Gabriela Dabrowski	(Chinese Taipei) Latisha Chan (Croatia) Ivan Dodig	1–6, 6–7^{(5–7)}
Win	2023	Wimbledon	Grass	(Ukraine) Lyudmyla Kichenok	(China) Xu Yifan (Belgium) Joran Vliegen	6–4, 6–7^{(9–11)}, 6–3

== Olympic finals ==
=== Doubles: 1 (1 Gold medal) ===
Result	Year	Tournament	Surface	Partner	Opponents	Score
Gold	2021	Summer Olympics	Hard	(Croatia) Nikola Mektić	(Croatia) Marin Čilić (Croatia) Ivan Dodig	6–4, 3–6, [10–6]

== Year-end championships ==
=== Doubles: 3 (3 runner-ups) ===
Result	Year	Championships	Surface	Partner	Opponents	Score
Loss	2022	ATP Finals, Turin	Hard (i)	(Croatia) Nikola Mektić	(United States) Rajeev Ram (United Kingdom) Joe Salisbury	6–7^{(4–7)}, 4–6
Loss	2024	ATP Finals, Turin	Hard (i)	(El Salvador) Marcelo Arévalo	(Germany) Kevin Krawietz (Germany) Tim Pütz	6–7^{(5–7)}, 6–7^{(6–8)}
Loss	2026	ATP Finals, Turin	Hard (i)	(El Salvador) Marcelo Arévalo	(France) Théo Arribagé (France) Albano Olivetti	6–3, 6–7^{(2–7)}, [6–10]

== Masters 1000 finals ==
=== Doubles: 17 (9 titles, 8 runner-ups) ===
Result	Year	Tournament	Surface	Partner	Opponents	Score
Loss	2018	Monte-Carlo Masters	Clay	(Austria) Oliver Marach	(United States) Bob Bryan (United States) Mike Bryan	6–7^{(5–7)}, 3–6
Win	2019	Shanghai Masters	Hard	(Brazil) Bruno Soares	(Poland) Łukasz Kubot (Brazil) Marcelo Melo	6–4, 6–2
Loss	2020	Paris Masters	Hard (i)	(Brazil) Bruno Soares	(Canada) Félix Auger-Aliassime (Poland) Hubert Hurkacz	7–6^{(7–3)}, 6–7^{(7–9)}, [2–10]
Win	2021	Miami Open	Hard	(Croatia) Nikola Mektić	(United Kingdom) Dan Evans (United Kingdom) Neal Skupski	6–4, 6–4
Win	2021	Monte-Carlo Masters	Clay	(Croatia) Nikola Mektić	(United Kingdom) Dan Evans (United Kingdom) Neal Skupski	6–3, 4–6, [10–7]
Loss	2021	Madrid Open	Clay	(Croatia) Nikola Mektić	(Spain) Marcel Granollers (Argentina) Horacio Zeballos	6–1, 3–6, [8–10]
Win	2021	Italian Open	Clay	(Croatia) Nikola Mektić	(United States) Rajeev Ram (United Kingdom) Joe Salisbury	6–4, 7–6^{(7–4)}
Loss	2021	Canadian Open	Hard	(Croatia) Nikola Mektić	(United States) Rajeev Ram (United Kingdom) Joe Salisbury	3–6, 6–4, [3–10]
Win	2022	Italian Open (2)	Clay	(Croatia) Nikola Mektić	(United States) John Isner (Argentina) Diego Schwartzman	6–2, 6–7^{(6–8)}, [12–10]
Loss	2024	Italian Open	Clay	(El Salvador) Marcelo Arévalo	(Spain) Marcel Granollers (Argentina) Horacio Zeballos	2–6, 2–6
Win	2024	Cincinnati Masters	Hard	(El Salvador) Marcelo Arévalo	(United States) Mackenzie McDonald (United States) Alex Michelsen	6–2, 6–4
Win	2025	Indian Wells Open	Hard	(El Salvador) Marcelo Arévalo	(United States) Sebastian Korda (Australia) Jordan Thompson	6–3, 6–4
Win	2025	Miami Open (2)	Hard	(El Salvador) Marcelo Arévalo	(United Kingdom) Julian Cash (United Kingdom) Lloyd Glasspool	7–6^{(7–3)}, 6–3
Loss	2025	Madrid Open	Clay	(El Salvador) Marcelo Arévalo	(Spain) Marcel Granollers (Argentina) Horacio Zeballos	4–6, 4–6
Win	2025	Italian Open (3)	Clay	(El Salvador) Marcelo Arévalo	(France) Sadio Doumbia (France) Fabien Reboul	6–4, 6–7^{(6–8)}, [13–11]
Loss	2026	Monte-Carlo Masters	Clay	(El Salvador) Marcelo Arévalo	(Germany) Kevin Krawietz (Germany) Tim Pütz	6–4, 2–6, [8–10]
Loss	2026	Canadian Open	Hard	(El Salvador) Marcelo Arévalo	(Brazil) Orlando Luz (Brazil) Rafael Matos	7−5, 4−6, [6−10]

== ATP career finals ==
=== Doubles: 81 (43 titles, 38 runner-ups) ===
Legend Grand Slam tournaments (4–5) ATP World Tour Finals (0–3) ATP World Tour Masters 1000 (9–8) Summer Olympics (1–0) ATP World Tour 500 Series (5–7) ATP World Tour 250 Series (24–15)	Finals by surface Hard (22–20) Clay (12–12) Grass (9–6)	Finals by setting Outdoor (37–26) Indoor (6–12)

Result	W–L	Date	Tournament	Tier	Surface	Partner	Opponents	Score
Loss	0–1	Feb 2012	Zagreb Indoors, Croatia	250 Series	Hard (i)	(Croatia) Ivan Dodig	(Cyprus) Marcos Baghdatis (Russia) Mikhail Youzhny	2–6, 2–6
Loss	0–2	Feb 2013	Zagreb Indoors, Croatia	250 Series	Hard (i)	(Croatia) Ivan Dodig	(Austria) Julian Knowle (Slovakia) Filip Polášek	3–6, 3–6
Loss	0–3	Jan 2014	Chennai Open, India	250 Series	Hard	(Croatia) Marin Draganja	(Sweden) Johan Brunström (Denmark) Frederik Nielsen	2–6, 6–4, [7–10]
Win	1–3	May 2015	Open de Nice Côte d'Azur, France	250 Series	Clay	(New Zealand) Michael Venus	(Netherlands) Jean-Julien Rojer (Romania) Horia Tecău	7–6^{(7–4)}, 2–6, [10–7]
Loss	1–4	Jul 2015	Hall of Fame Championships, United States	250 Series	Grass	(United States) Nicholas Monroe	(United Kingdom) Jonathan Marray (Pakistan) Aisam-ul-Haq Qureshi	6–4, 3–6, [8–10]
Loss	1–5	Jul 2015	Colombia Open, Colombia	250 Series	Hard	(New Zealand) Michael Venus	(France) Édouard Roger-Vasselin (Czech Republic) Radek Štěpánek	5–7, 3–6
Loss	1–6	Oct 2015	Stockholm Open, Sweden	250 Series	Hard (i)	(New Zealand) Michael Venus	(United States) Nicholas Monroe (United States) Jack Sock	5–7, 2–6
Win	2–6	Jan 2016	Auckland Open, New Zealand	250 Series	Hard	(New Zealand) Michael Venus	(United States) Eric Butorac (United States) Scott Lipsky	7–5, 6–4
Win	3–6	Feb 2016	Open Sud de France, France	250 Series	Hard (i)	(New Zealand) Michael Venus	(Germany) Alexander Zverev (Germany) Mischa Zverev	7–5, 7–6^{(7–4)}
Win	4–6	Feb 2016	Open 13, France	250 Series	Hard (i)	(New Zealand) Michael Venus	(Israel) Jonathan Erlich (United Kingdom) Colin Fleming	6–2, 6–3
Loss	4–7	May 2016	Open de Nice Côte d'Azur, France	250 Series	Clay	(New Zealand) Michael Venus	(Colombia) Juan Sebastián Cabal (Colombia) Robert Farah	6–4, 4–6, [8–10]
Win	5–7	Jun 2016	Rosmalen Championships, Netherlands	250 Series	Grass	(New Zealand) Michael Venus	(United Kingdom) Dominic Inglot (South Africa) Raven Klaasen	3–6, 6–3, [11–9]
Loss	5–8	Jul 2016	Swiss Open, Switzerland	250 Series	Clay	(New Zealand) Michael Venus	(Chile) Julio Peralta (Argentina) Horacio Zeballos	6–7^{(2–7)}, 2–6
Loss	5–9	Sep 2016	Moselle Open, France	250 Series	Hard (i)	(New Zealand) Michael Venus	(Chile) Julio Peralta (Argentina) Horacio Zeballos	3–6, 6–7^{(4–7)}
Loss	5–10	Oct 2016	Stockholm Open, Sweden	250 Series	Hard (i)	(New Zealand) Michael Venus	(Sweden) Elias Ymer (Sweden) Mikael Ymer	1–6, 1–6
Win	6–10	Apr 2017	Grand Prix Hassan II, Morocco	250 Series	Clay	(United Kingdom) Dominic Inglot	(Spain) Marcel Granollers (Spain) Marc López	6–4, 2–6, [11–9]
Loss	6–11	Jun 2017	Stuttgart Open, Germany	250 Series	Grass	(Austria) Oliver Marach	(United Kingdom) Jamie Murray (Brazil) Bruno Soares	7–6^{(7–4)}, 5–7, [5–10]
Loss	6–12	Jun 2017	Antalya Open, Turkey	250 Series	Grass	(Austria) Oliver Marach	(Sweden) Robert Lindstedt (Pakistan) Aisam-ul-Haq Qureshi	5–7, 1–4 ret.
Loss	6–13	Jul 2017	Wimbledon Championships, United Kingdom	Grand Slam	Grass	(Austria) Oliver Marach	(Poland) Łukasz Kubot (Brazil) Marcelo Melo	7–5, 5–7, 6–7^{(2–7)}, 6–3, 11–13
Win	7–13	Jul 2017	German Open, Germany	500 Series	Clay	(Croatia) Ivan Dodig	(Uruguay) Pablo Cuevas (Spain) Marc López	6–3, 6–4
Win	8–13	Oct 2017	Stockholm Open, Sweden	250 Series	Hard (i)	(Austria) Oliver Marach	(Pakistan) Aisam-ul-Haq Qureshi (Netherlands) Jean-Julien Rojer	3–6, 7–6^{(8–6)}, [10–4]
Win	9–13	Jan 2018	Qatar Open, Qatar	250 Series	Hard	(Austria) Oliver Marach	(United Kingdom) Jamie Murray (Brazil) Bruno Soares	6–2, 7–6^{(8–6)}
Win	10–13	Jan 2018	Auckland Open, New Zealand (2)	250 Series	Hard	(Austria) Oliver Marach	(Belarus) Max Mirnyi (Austria) Philipp Oswald	6–4, 5–7, [10–7]
Win	11–13	Jan 2018	Australian Open, Australia	Grand Slam	Hard	(Austria) Oliver Marach	(Colombia) Juan Sebastián Cabal (Colombia) Robert Farah	6–4, 6–4
Loss	11–14	Feb 2018	Rotterdam Open, Netherlands	500 Series	Hard (i)	(Austria) Oliver Marach	(France) Pierre-Hugues Herbert (France) Nicolas Mahut	6–2, 2–6, [7–10]
Loss	11–15	Apr 2018	Monte-Carlo Masters, Monaco	Masters 1000	Clay	(Austria) Oliver Marach	(United States) Bob Bryan (United States) Mike Bryan	6–7^{(5–7)}, 3–6
Win	12–15	May 2018	Geneva Open, Switzerland	250 Series	Clay	(Austria) Oliver Marach	(Croatia) Ivan Dodig (United States) Rajeev Ram	3–6, 7–6^{(7–3)}, [11–9]
Loss	12–16	Jun 2018	French Open, France	Grand Slam	Clay	(Austria) Oliver Marach	(France) Pierre-Hugues Herbert (France) Nicolas Mahut	2–6, 6–7^{(4–7)}
Loss	12–17	Jul 2018	German Open, Germany	500 Series	Clay	(Austria) Oliver Marach	(Chile) Julio Peralta (Argentina) Horacio Zeballos	1–6, 6–4, [6–10]
Win	13–17	Sep 2018	Chengdu Open, China	250 Series	Hard	(Croatia) Ivan Dodig	(United States) Austin Krajicek (India) Jeevan Nedunchezhiyan	6–2, 6–4
Loss	13–18	Oct 2018	China Open, China	500 Series	Hard	(Austria) Oliver Marach	(Poland) Łukasz Kubot (Brazil) Marcelo Melo	1–6, 4–6
Win	14–18	May 2019	Geneva Open, Switzerland (2)	250 Series	Clay	(Austria) Oliver Marach	(Australia) Matthew Ebden (Sweden) Robert Lindstedt	6–4, 6–4
Win	15–18	Oct 2019	Shanghai Masters, China	Masters 1000	Hard	(Brazil) Bruno Soares	(Poland) Łukasz Kubot (Brazil) Marcelo Melo	6–4, 6–2
Loss	15–19	Oct 2019	Stockholm Open, Sweden	250 Series	Hard (i)	(Brazil) Bruno Soares	(Finland) Henri Kontinen (France) Édouard Roger-Vasselin	4–6, 2–6
Win	16–19	Feb 2020	Open Sud de France, France (2)	250 Series	Hard (i)	(Serbia) Nikola Ćaćić	(Pakistan) Aisam-ul-Haq Qureshi (United Kingdom) Dominic Inglot	6–4, 6–7^{(4–7)}, [10–4]
Win	17–19	Sep 2020	US Open, United States	Grand Slam	Hard	(Brazil) Bruno Soares	(Netherlands) Wesley Koolhof (Croatia) Nikola Mektić	7–5, 6–3
Loss	17–20	Sep 2020	Hamburg Open, Germany	500 Series	Clay	(Croatia) Ivan Dodig	(Australia) John Peers (New Zealand) Michael Venus	3–6, 4–6
Loss	17–21	Oct 2020	French Open, France	Grand Slam	Clay	(Brazil) Bruno Soares	(Germany) Kevin Krawietz (Germany) Andreas Mies	3–6, 5–7
Loss	17–22	Nov 2020	Paris Masters, France	Masters 1000	Hard (i)	(Brazil) Bruno Soares	(Canada) Félix Auger-Aliassime (Poland) Hubert Hurkacz	7–6^{(7–3)}, 6–7^{(7–9)}, [2–10]
Win	18–22	Jan 2021	Antalya Open, Turkey	250 Series	Hard	(Croatia) Nikola Mektić	(Croatia) Ivan Dodig (Slovakia) Filip Polášek	6–2, 6–4
Win	19–22	Feb 2021	Murray River Open, Australia	250 Series	Hard	(Croatia) Nikola Mektić	(France) Jérémy Chardy (France) Fabrice Martin	7–6^{(7–2)}, 6–3
Win	20–22	Mar 2021	Rotterdam Open, Netherlands	500 Series	Hard (i)	(Croatia) Nikola Mektić	(Germany) Kevin Krawietz (Romania) Horia Tecău	7–6^{(9–7)}, 6–2
Loss	20–23	Mar 2021	Dubai Tennis Championships, United Arab Emirates	500 Series	Hard	(Croatia) Nikola Mektić	(Colombia) Juan Sebastián Cabal (Colombia) Robert Farah	6–7^{(0–7)}, 6–7^{(4–7)}
Win	21–23	Apr 2021	Miami Open, United States	Masters 1000	Hard	(Croatia) Nikola Mektić	(United Kingdom) Dan Evans (United Kingdom) Neal Skupski	6–4, 6–4
Win	22–23	Apr 2021	Monte-Carlo Masters, Monaco	Masters 1000	Clay	(Croatia) Nikola Mektić	(United Kingdom) Dan Evans (United Kingdom) Neal Skupski	6–3, 4–6, [10–7]
Loss	22–24	May 2021	Madrid Open, Spain	Masters 1000	Clay	(Croatia) Nikola Mektić	(Spain) Marcel Granollers (Argentina) Horacio Zeballos	6–1, 3–6, [8–10]
Win	23–24	May 2021	Italian Open, Italy	Masters 1000	Clay	(Croatia) Nikola Mektić	(United States) Rajeev Ram (United Kingdom) Joe Salisbury	6–4, 7–6^{(7–4)}
Win	24–24	Jun 2021	Eastbourne International, United Kingdom	250 Series	Grass	(Croatia) Nikola Mektić	(United States) Rajeev Ram (United Kingdom) Joe Salisbury	6–4, 6–3
Win	25–24	Jul 2021	Wimbledon Championships, United Kingdom	Grand Slam	Grass	(Croatia) Nikola Mektić	(Spain) Marcel Granollers (Argentina) Horacio Zeballos	6–4, 7–6^{(7–5)}, 2–6, 7–5
Win	26–24	Jul 2021	Olympic Games, Japan	Olympics	Hard	(Croatia) Nikola Mektić	(Croatia) Ivan Dodig (Croatia) Marin Čilić	6–4, 3–6, [10–6]
Loss	26–25	Aug 2021	Canadian Open, Canada	Masters 1000	Hard	(Croatia) Nikola Mektić	(United States) Rajeev Ram (United Kingdom) Joe Salisbury	3–6, 6–4, [3–10]
Loss	26–26	Feb 2022	Dubai Tennis Championships, United Arab Emirates	500 Series	Hard	(Croatia) Nikola Mektić	(Germany) Tim Pütz (New Zealand) Michael Venus	3–6, 7–6^{(7–5)}, [14–16]
Loss	26–27	Apr 2022	Serbia Open, Serbia	250 Series	Clay	(Croatia) Nikola Mektić	(Uruguay) Ariel Behar (Ecuador) Gonzalo Escobar	2–6, 6–3, [7–10]
Win	27–27	May 2022	Italian Open, Italy (2)	Masters 1000	Clay	(Croatia) Nikola Mektić	(United States) John Isner (Argentina) Diego Schwartzman	6–2, 6–7^{(6–8)}, [12–10]
Win	28–27	May 2022	Geneva Open, Switzerland	250 Series	Clay	(Croatia) Nikola Mektić	(Netherlands) Matwé Middelkoop (Spain) Pablo Andújar	2–6, 6–2, [10–3]
Win	29–27	Jun 2022	Stuttgart Open, Germany	250 Series	Grass	(Poland) Hubert Hurkacz	(Germany) Tim Pütz (New Zealand) Michael Venus	7–6^{(7–3)}, 7–6^{(7–5)}
Win	30–27	Jun 2022	Queen's Club Championships, United Kingdom	500 Series	Grass	(Croatia) Nikola Mektić	(United Kingdom) Lloyd Glasspool (Finland) Harri Heliövaara	3–6, 7–6^{(7–3)}, [10–6]
Win	31–27	Jun 2022	Eastbourne International, United Kingdom (2)	250 Series	Grass	(Croatia) Nikola Mektić	(Netherlands) Matwé Middelkoop (Australia) Luke Saville	6–4, 6–2
Loss	31–28	Jul 2022	Wimbledon Championships, United Kingdom	Grand Slam	Grass	(Croatia) Nikola Mektić	(Australia) Matthew Ebden (Australia) Max Purcell	6–7^{(5–7)}, 7–6^{(7–3)}, 6–4, 4–6, 6–7^{(2–10)}
Win	32–28	Oct 2022	Astana Open, Kazakhstan	500 Series	Hard (i)	(Croatia) Nikola Mektić	(France) Adrian Mannarino (France) Fabrice Martin	6–4, 6–2
Loss	32–29	Nov 2022	ATP Finals, Italy	Tour Finals	Hard (i)	(Croatia) Nikola Mektić	(United States) Rajeev Ram (United Kingdom) Joe Salisbury	6–7^{(4–7)}, 4–6
Win	33–29	Jan 2023	Auckland Open, New Zealand (3)	250 Series	Hard	(Croatia) Nikola Mektić	(United States) Nathaniel Lammons (United States) Jackson Withrow	6–4, 6–7^{(5–7)}, [10–6]
Win	34–29	Jun 2023	Stuttgart Open, Germany (2)	250 Series	Grass	(Croatia) Nikola Mektić	(Germany) Kevin Krawietz (Germany) Tim Pütz	7–6^{(7–2)}, 6–3
Win	35–29	Jun 2023	Eastbourne International, United Kingdom (3)	250 Series	Grass	(Croatia) Nikola Mektić	(Croatia) Ivan Dodig (United States) Austin Krajicek	6–4, 6–2
Loss	35–30	Sep 2023	Astana Open, Kazakhstan	250 Series	Hard (i)	(Australia) John Peers	(United States) Nathaniel Lammons (United States) Jackson Withrow	6–7^{(4–7)}, 6–7^{(7–9)}
Win	36–30	Jan 2024	Hong Kong Open, China	250 Series	Hard	(El Salvador) Marcelo Arévalo	(Belgium) Sander Gillé (Belgium) Joran Vliegen	7–6^{(7–3)}, 6–4
Loss	36–31	May 2024	Italian Open, Italy	Masters 1000	Clay	(El Salvador) Marcelo Arévalo	(Spain) Marcel Granollers (Argentina) Horacio Zeballos	2–6, 2–6
Win	37–31	May 2024	Geneva Open, Switzerland	250 Series	Clay	(El Salvador) Marcelo Arévalo	(Netherlands) Jean-Julien Rojer (United Kingdom) Lloyd Glasspool	7–6^{(7–2)}, 7–5
Win	38–31	Jun 2024	French Open, France	Grand Slam	Clay	(El Salvador) Marcelo Arévalo	(Italy) Simone Bolelli (Italy) Andrea Vavassori	7–5, 6–3
Win	39–31	Aug 2024	Cincinnati Masters, United States	Masters 1000	Hard	(El Salvador) Marcelo Arévalo	(United States) Mackenzie McDonald (United States) Alex Michelsen	6–2, 6–4
Loss	39–32	Nov 2024	ATP Finals, Italy	Tour Finals	Hard (i)	(El Salvador) Marcelo Arévalo	(Germany) Kevin Krawietz (Germany) Tim Pütz	6–7^{(5–7)}, 6–7^{(6–8)}
Win	40–32	Mar 2025	Indian Wells Open, United States	Masters 1000	Hard	(El Salvador) Marcelo Arévalo	(United States) Sebastian Korda (Australia) Jordan Thompson	6–3, 6–4
Win	41–32	Mar 2025	Miami Open, United States (2)	Masters 1000	Hard	(El Salvador) Marcelo Arévalo	(United Kingdom) Julian Cash (United Kingdom) Lloyd Glasspool	7–6^{(7–3)}, 6–3
Loss	41–33	May 2025	Madrid Open, Spain	Masters 1000	Clay	(El Salvador) Marcelo Arévalo	(Spain) Marcel Granollers (Argentina) Horacio Zeballos	4–6, 4–6
Win	42–33	May 2025	Italian Open, Italy (3)	Masters 1000	Clay	(El Salvador) Marcelo Arévalo	(France) Sadio Doumbia (France) Fabien Reboul	6–4, 6–7^{(6–8)}, [13–11]
Loss	42–34	Feb 2026	Dubai Tennis Championships, United Arab Emirates	500 Series	Hard	(El Salvador) Marcelo Arévalo	(Finland) Harri Heliövaara (United Kingdom) Henry Patten	5–7, 5–7
Loss	42–35	Apr 2026	Monte-Carlo Masters, Monaco	Masters 1000	Clay	(El Salvador) Marcelo Arévalo	(Germany) Kevin Krawietz (Germany) Tim Pütz	6–4, 2–6, [8–10]
Win	43–35	Jun 2026	Queen's Club Championships, United Kingdom (2)	500 Series	Grass	(El Salvador) Marcelo Arévalo	(Finland) Harri Heliövaara (United Kingdom) Henry Patten	6–2, 6–4
Loss	43–36	Jul 2026	Wimbledon Championships, United Kingdom	Grand Slam	Grass	(El Salvador) Marcelo Arévalo	(Finland) Harri Heliövaara (United Kingdom) Henry Patten	6–7^{(4–7)}, 6–7^{(3–7)}
Loss	43–37	Aug 2026	Canadian Open, Canada	Masters 1000	Hard	(El Salvador) Marcelo Arévalo	(Brazil) Orlando Luz (Brazil) Rafael Matos	7−5, 4−6, [6−10]
Loss	43–38	Nov 2026	ATP Finals, Italy	Tour Finals	Hard (i)	(El Salvador) Marcelo Arévalo	(France) Théo Arribagé (France) Albano Olivetti	6–3, 6–7^{(2–7)}, [6–10]

== Doubles performance timeline ==
Key
W	F	SF	QF	#R	RR	Q#	P#	DNQ	A	Z#	PO	G	S	B	NMS	NTI	P	NH

(W) winner; (F) finalist; (SF) semifinalist; (QF) quarterfinalist; (#R) rounds 4, 3, 2, 1; (RR) round-robin stage; (Q#) qualification round; (P#) preliminary round; (DNQ) did not qualify; (A) absent; (Z#) Davis/Fed Cup Zonal Group (with number indication) or (PO) play-off; (G) gold, (S) silver or (B) bronze Olympic/Paralympic medal; (NMS) not a Masters tournament; (NTI) not a Tier I tournament; (P) postponed; (NH) not held; (SR) strike rate (events won / competed); (W–L) win–loss record.
To avoid confusion and double counting, these charts are updated at the conclusion of a tournament or when the player's participation has ended.

Current through the 2025 ATP Finals.

Tournament	2011	2012	2013	2014	2015	2016	2017	2018	2019	2020	2021	2022	2023	2024	2025	SR	W–L
Grand Slam tournaments
Australian Open	A	A	A	2R	1R	1R	1R	W	2R	3R	SF	2R	2R	3R	QF	1 / 12	21–11
French Open	A	A	A	3R	1R	1R	2R	F	3R	F	A	3R	1R	W	3R	1 / 11	25–10
Wimbledon	A	A	A	3R	3R	3R	F	1R	2R	NH	W	F	3R	QF	SF	1 / 11	32–10
US Open	A	A	A	2R	2R	2R	3R	1R	2R	W	1R	QF	2R	SF	2R	1 / 12	20–11
Win–loss	0–0	0–0	0–0	6–4	3–4	3–4	8–4	11–3	5–4	12–2	10–2	11–4	4–4	15–3	10–4	4 / 46	98–42
Year-end championship
ATP Finals	Did not qualify						RR	RR	DNQ	RR	SF	F	DNQ	F	RR	0 / 7	14–10
ATP World Tour Masters 1000
Indian Wells Masters	A	A	A	A	A	A	A	SF	SF	NH	QF	1R	2R	2R	W	1 / 7	15–6
Miami Open	A	A	A	A	A	A	1R	QF	QF	NH	W	2R	1R	2R	W	2 / 8	16–6
Monte-Carlo Masters	A	A	A	A	A	A	A	F	2R	NH	W	QF	2R	SF	SF	1 / 7	13–6
Madrid Open	A	A	A	A	A	A	2R	A	QF	NH	F	2R	2R	2R	F	0 / 7	11–7
Italian Open	A	A	A	A	A	A	2R	QF	SF	QF	W	W	1R	F	W	3 / 9	26–6
Canadian Open	A	A	A	A	A	A	SF	SF	1R	NH	F	2R	QF	SF	QF	0 / 8	13–8
Cincinnati Masters	A	A	A	A	A	A	2R	2R	SF	1R	2R	2R	2R	W	QF	1 / 9	11–8
Shanghai Masters	A	A	A	A	A	SF	QF	SF	W	NH			A	1R	SF	1 / 6	14–5
Paris Masters	A	A	A	A	A	A	1R	SF	1R	F	2R	A	SF	2R	A	0 / 7	8–6
Win–loss	0–0	0–0	0–0	0–0	0–0	3–1	5–7	13–7	19–8	5–3	22–5	9–6	8–8	15–8	28–5	9 / 68	127–58
National representation
Davis Cup	A	A	PO	Z1	A	A	A	W	RR	F		SF	RR	PO	PO	1 / 5	11–10
Summer Olympics	NH	A	Not Held			A	Not Held				G	Not Held		1R	NH	1 / 2	5–1
Career statistics
Titles	0	0	0	0	1	4	3	5	2	2	9	6	3	4	3	42	
Finals	0	1	1	1	4	8	6	10	3	5	12	10	3	6	4	75	
Overall win–loss	0–0	5–2	5–4	18–18	19–16	39–22	47–27	56–21	41–26	30–15	65–14	55–21	34–26	48–22	50–19	512–252	
Year-end ranking	379	130	71	56	54	29	17	3	18	4	1	5	32	1	7	67.02%	

Awards
Preceded by (Poland) Łukasz Kubot & (Brazil) Marcelo Melo	ATP Doubles Team of the Year (with (Austria) Oliver Marach); 2018	Succeeded by (Colombia) Juan Sebastián Cabal & (Colombia) Robert Farah
