= Zagreb Indoors =

Coordinates: 45.808°N 15.951°E

Defunct tennis tournament
- Founded: 1996
- Abolished: 2015
- Editions: 13
- Location: Zagreb, Croatia
- Venue: Dom Sportova
- Category: ATP World Series / ATP International Series / ATP World Tour 250 series (1996–2015)
- Surface: Hard / indoors
- Draw: 32S/32Q/16D
- Prize money: $416,000
- Website: zagrebIndoors.com

The Zagreb Indoors (currently sponsored by PBZ) was a men's tennis event on the ATP Tour held in the Croatian capital of Zagreb, other than in 1998 when it was held in Split. From 1996 to 1998, the tournament was named the Croatian Indoors. From 2009 until 2015, it was a part of the ATP 250 Series and offered 250 ranking points. The tournament was played on a fast and hard indoor surface (RuKort) and featured both men's singles and men's doubles tournament.

The Zagreb Indoors was held for the first time in nine years in 2006. The tournament was an ATP International Series tournament from 2006 to 2008. Previously, it had been an ATP World Series event from 1996 to 1997.

Due to financial difficulties, the tournament was not held in 2016 and was replaced on the ATP calendar by the Sofia Open.

== Past finals ==
=== Singles ===
Year	Champion	Runner-up	Score
1996	(Croatia) Goran Ivanišević	(France) Cédric Pioline	3–6, 6–3, 6–2
1997	(Croatia) Goran Ivanišević (2)	(United Kingdom) Greg Rusedski	7–6, 4–6, 7–6
1998	(Croatia) Goran Ivanišević (3)	(United Kingdom) Greg Rusedski	7–6^{(7–3)}, 7–6^{(7–5)}
1999– 2005	not held		
2006	(Croatia) Ivan Ljubičić	(Austria) Stefan Koubek	6–3, 6–4
2007	(Cyprus) Marcos Baghdatis	(Croatia) Ivan Ljubičić	7–6^{(7–4)}, 4–6, 6–4
2008	(Ukraine) Sergiy Stakhovsky	(Croatia) Ivan Ljubičić	7–5, 6–4
2009	(Croatia) Marin Čilić	(Croatia) Mario Ančić	6–3, 6–4
2010	(Croatia) Marin Čilić (2)	(Germany) Michael Berrer	6–4, 6–7^{(7–5)}, 6–3
2011	(Croatia) Ivan Dodig	(Germany) Michael Berrer	6–3, 6–4
2012	(Russia) Mikhail Youzhny	(Slovakia) Lukáš Lacko	6–2, 6–3
2013	(Croatia) Marin Čilić (3)	(Austria) Jürgen Melzer	6–3, 6–1
2014	(Croatia) Marin Čilić (4)	(Germany) Tommy Haas	6–3, 6–4
2015	(Spain) Guillermo García-López	(Italy) Andreas Seppi	7–6^{(7–4)}, 6–3
2016	succeeded by ATP Sofia Open		

=== Doubles ===
Year	Champions	Runners-up	Score
1996	(Belgium) Libor Pimek (Netherlands) Menno Oosting	(Czech Republic) Martin Damm (Netherlands) Hendrik Jan Davids	6–3, 7–6
1997	(Croatia) Saša Hiršzon (Croatia) Goran Ivanišević	(United States) Mark Keil (South Africa) Brent Haygarth	6–4, 6–3
1998	(Czech Republic) Martin Damm (Czech Republic) Jiří Novák	(Sweden) Fredrik Bergh (Sweden) Patrik Fredriksson	7–6, 6–2
1999– 2005	not held		
2006	(Czech Republic) Jaroslav Levinský (Slovakia) Michal Mertiňák	(Italy) Davide Sanguinetti (Italy) Andreas Seppi	7–6^{(8–6)}, 6–1
2007	(Germany) Michael Kohlmann (Germany) Alexander Waske	(Czech Republic) František Čermák (Czech Republic) Jaroslav Levinský	7–6^{(7–5)}, 4–6, [10–5]
2008	(Australia) Paul Hanley (Australia) Jordan Kerr	(Germany) Christopher Kas (Netherlands) Rogier Wassen	6–3, 3–6, [10–8]
2009	(Czech Republic) Martin Damm (Sweden) Robert Lindstedt	(Germany) Christopher Kas (Netherlands) Rogier Wassen	6–4, 6–3
2010	(Austria) Jürgen Melzer (Germany) Philipp Petzschner	(France) Arnaud Clément (Belgium) Olivier Rochus	3–6, 6–3, [10–8]
2011	(Belgium) Dick Norman (Romania) Horia Tecău	(Spain) Marcel Granollers (Spain) Marc López	6–3, 6–4
2012	(Cyprus) Marcos Baghdatis (Russia) Mikhail Youzhny	(Croatia) Ivan Dodig (Croatia) Mate Pavić	6–2, 6–2
2013	(Austria) Julian Knowle (Slovakia) Filip Polášek	(Croatia) Ivan Dodig (Croatia) Mate Pavić	6–3, 6–3
2014	(Netherlands) Jean-Julien Rojer (Romania) Horia Tecău (2)	(Germany) Philipp Marx (Slovakia) Michal Mertiňák	3–6, 6–4, [10–2]
2015	(Croatia) Marin Draganja (Finland) Henri Kontinen	(France) Fabrice Martin (India) Purav Raja	6–4, 6–4
2016	succeeded by ATP Sofia Open		

== See also ==
- List of tennis tournaments
