= 2017 Apia International Sydney – Men's singles =

Men's singles
- 2017 Apia International Sydney

Final
- Champion: (Luxembourg) Gilles Müller
- Runner-up: (United Kingdom) Daniel Evans
- Score: 7–6^{(7–5)}, 6–2

Details
- Draw: 28 (4 Q / 3 WC )
- Seeds: 8

Events
Singles	men	women
Doubles	men	women
← 2016 ·	Sydney International	· 2018 →

Viktor Troicki was the two-time defending champion, but lost in the semifinals to Gilles Müller.

Müller went on to win his first ATP title, defeating Daniel Evans in the final, 7–6^{(7–5)}, 6–2.

== Seeds ==
The top four seeds receive a bye into the second round.

1. (Austria) Dominic Thiem (quarterfinals)
2. (Uruguay) Pablo Cuevas (quarterfinals)
3. (Serbia) Viktor Troicki (semifinals)
4. (Spain) Pablo Carreño Busta (quarterfinals)
5. (Germany) Philipp Kohlschreiber (quarterfinals, withdrew)
6. (Luxembourg) Gilles Müller (champion)
7. (Slovakia) Martin Kližan (first round, retired with foot injury)
8. (Spain) Marcel Granollers (second round)

== Draw ==
=== Finals ===
Semifinals
(United Kingdom) Daniel Evans	6	3	6
(Russia) Andrey Kuznetsov	2	6	3
3	(Serbia) Viktor Troicki	3	6^{6}
6	(Luxembourg) Gilles Müller	6	7^{8}

Final
(United Kingdom) Daniel Evans	6^{5}	2
6	(Luxembourg) Gilles Müller	7^{7}	6

=== Top half ===
First round
Q	(Portugal) G Elias	6^{3}	6	6
Q	(Australia) C O'Connell	7^{7}	4	1
(United Kingdom) D Evans	6	4	6
Q	(Brazil) T Monteiro	3	6	3
LL	(Colombia) S Giraldo	7^{7}	5	3
8	(Spain) M Granollers	6^{5}	7	6
(Germany) M Zverev	6	6
(Spain) N Almagro	4	2
WC	(Australia) A De Minaur	6	3	7^{7}
(France) B Paire	3	6	6^{1}
(Russia) A Kuznetsov	2	6	3
7	(Slovakia) M Kližan	6	1	0^{r}

Second round
1	(Austria) D Thiem	6^{5}	6	7
Q	(Portugal) G Elias	7^{7}	3	5
(United Kingdom) D Evans	1	6	6
8	(Spain) M Granollers	6	3	3
4	(Spain) P Carreño Busta	3	7^{7}	6
(Germany) M Zverev	6	6^{4}	3
WC	(Australia) A De Minaur	2	0^{r}
(Russia) A Kuznetsov	6	0

Quarterfinals
1	(Austria) D Thiem	6	4	1
(United Kingdom) D Evans	3	6	6
4	(Spain) P Carreño Busta	6	4	1
(Russia) A Kuznetsov	2	6	6

Semifinals
(United Kingdom) D Evans	6	3	6
(Russia) A Kuznetsov	2	6	3

=== Bottom half ===
First round
5	(Germany) P Kohlschreiber	6	6
(Italy) F Fognini	4	4
LL	(Georgia (country)) N Basilashvili	5	2
WC	(Australia) J Thompson	7	6
(Germany) F Mayer	6^{4}	6	6^{5}
(Italy) P Lorenzi	7^{7}	4	7^{7}
6	(Luxembourg) G Müller	3	6	7
(Ukraine) A Dolgopolov	6	3	5
Q	(Australia) M Barton	7^{7}	7^{7}
(United Kingdom) K Edmund	6^{3}	6^{5}
(Brazil) T Bellucci	2	6^{2}
(France) N Mahut	6	7^{7}

Second round
5	(Germany) P Kohlschreiber	7	6
WC	(Australia) J Thompson	5	4
(Italy) P Lorenzi	3	4
3	(Serbia) V Troicki	6	6
6	(Luxembourg) G Müller	6	3	6
Q	(Australia) M Barton	1	6	4
(France) N Mahut	4	6	2
2	(Uruguay) P Cuevas	6	2	6

Quarterfinals
5	(Germany) P Kohlschreiber
3	(Serbia) V Troicki	w/o
6	(Luxembourg) G Müller	7^{7}	6
2	(Uruguay) P Cuevas	6^{5}	4

Semifinals
3	(Serbia) V Troicki	3	6^{6}
6	(Luxembourg) G Müller	6	7^{8}

== Qualifying ==
=== Seeds ===
1. (France) Paul-Henri Mathieu (first round, retired)
2. (Ukraine) Illya Marchenko (first round)
3. (Portugal) Gastão Elias (qualified)
4. (Brazil) Thiago Monteiro (qualified)
5. (Kazakhstan) Mikhail Kukushkin (first round)
6. (Colombia) Santiago Giraldo (Qualifying Competition, lucky loser)
7. (Serbia) Dušan Lajović (first round)
8. (Georgia (country)) Nikoloz Basilashvili (qualifying competition, lucky loser)

=== Qualifiers ===
1. (Australia) Matthew Barton
2. (Australia) Christopher O'Connell
3. (Portugal) Gastão Elias
4. (Brazil) Thiago Monteiro

=== Lucky losers ===
1. (Colombia) Santiago Giraldo
2. (Georgia (country)) Nikoloz Basilashvili

=== Qualifying draw ===
==== First qualifier ====
First round
1	(France) Paul-Henri Mathieu	2^{r}
(France) Mathias Bourgue	0
(Australia) Matthew Barton	7^{7}	7
5	(Kazakhstan) Mikhail Kukushkin	6^{2}	5

Qualifying competition
(France) Mathias Bourgue	3	1
(Australia) Matthew Barton	6	6

==== Second qualifier ====
First round
2	(Ukraine) Illya Marchenko	3	3
WC	(Australia) Christopher O'Connell	6	6
(Spain) Enrique López Pérez	6	6
7	(Serbia) Dušan Lajović	3	4

Qualifying competition
WC	(Australia) Christopher O'Connell	6	7
(Spain) Enrique López Pérez	3	5

==== Third qualifier ====
First round
3	(Portugal) Gastão Elias	6	4	6
(Italy) Luca Vanni	4	6	2
(Brazil) Rogério Dutra Silva	4	3
8	(Georgia (country)) Nikoloz Basilashvili	6	6

Qualifying competition
3	(Portugal) Gastão Elias	7^{7}	6
8	(Georgia (country)) Nikoloz Basilashvili	6^{1}	4

==== Fourth qualifier ====
First round
4	(Brazil) Thiago Monteiro	5	7^{9}	6
(Italy) Thomas Fabbiano	7	6^{7}	3
WC	(Australia) Andrew Whittington	6^{2}	4
6	(Colombia) Santiago Giraldo	7^{7}	6

Qualifying competition
4	(Brazil) Thiago Monteiro	6	6
6	(Colombia) Santiago Giraldo	3	1

== See also ==
- 2017 Australian Open Series
