= 2017 Apia International Sydney – Women's singles =

Women's singles
- 2017 Apia International Sydney

Final
- Champion: (United Kingdom) Johanna Konta
- Runner-up: (Poland) Agnieszka Radwańska
- Score: 6–4, 6–2

Details
- Draw: 30 (4 Q / 2 WC )
- Seeds: 10

Events
Singles	men	women
Doubles	men	women
- Sydney International

The 2017 Apia International Sydney was a joint 2017 ATP World Tour and 2017 WTA Tour tennis tournament, played on outdoor hard courts in Sydney, New South Wales (NSW). It was the 124th edition of the tournament and took place at the NSW Tennis Centre in Sydney, Australia. It was held from 8 January through 14 January 2017 as part of the Australian Open Series in preparation for the first Grand Slam of the year.

Svetlana Kuznetsova was the defending champion, but lost in the second round to Anastasia Pavlyuchenkova.

Johanna Konta won the title, defeating Agnieszka Radwańska in the final, 6–4, 6–2.

== Seeds ==
The top two seeds received a bye into the second round.

1. (Germany) Angelique Kerber (second round)
2. (Poland) Agnieszka Radwańska (final)
3. (Slovakia) Dominika Cibulková (second round)
4. (Czech Republic) Karolína Plíšková (withdrew)
5. (Russia) Svetlana Kuznetsova (second round)
6. (United Kingdom) Johanna Konta (champion)
7. (Ukraine) Elina Svitolina (withdrew)
8. (Russia) Elena Vesnina (first round, retired)
9. (Italy) Roberta Vinci (second round)
10. (Denmark) Caroline Wozniacki (quarterfinals)

== Draw ==
=== Finals ===
Semifinals
6	(United Kingdom) Johanna Konta	6	6
WC	(Canada) Eugenie Bouchard	2	2
(Czech Republic) Barbora Strýcová	1	2
2	(Poland) Agnieszka Radwańska	6	6

Final
6	(United Kingdom) Johanna Konta	6	6
2	(Poland) Agnieszka Radwańska	4	2

=== Top half ===
First round
(Russia) D Kasatkina	3	6	6
(Hungary) T Babos	6	4	2
LL	(Croatia) D Vekić	3	6^{1}
(Australia) D Gavrilova	6	7^{7}
LL	(Australia) Ar Rodionova	3	4
6	(United Kingdom) J Konta	6	6
3	(Slovakia) D Cibulková	6	6
(Germany) L Siegemund	2	0
WC	(Canada) E Bouchard	7^{7}	6
(China) S Zhang	6^{1}	2
(Australia) S Stosur	3	1
(Russia) A Pavlyuchenkova	6	6
(Romania) I-C Begu	1	4
5	(Russia) S Kuznetsova	6	6

Second round
1	(Germany) A Kerber	6^{5}	2
(Russia) D Kasatkina	7^{7}	6
(Australia) D Gavrilova	1	3
6	(United Kingdom) J Konta	6	6
3	(Slovakia) D Cibulková	4	3
WC	(Canada) E Bouchard	6	6
(Russia) A Pavlyuchenkova	7	6
5	(Russia) S Kuznetsova	5	3

Quarterfinals
(Russia) D Kasatkina	3	5
6	(United Kingdom) J Konta	6	7
WC	(Canada) E Bouchard	6	6
(Russia) A Pavlyuchenkova	2	3

Semifinals
6	(United Kingdom) J Konta	6	6
WC	(Canada) E Bouchard	2	2

=== Bottom half ===
First round
10	(Denmark) C Wozniacki	6	2	6
(Puerto Rico) M Puig	3	6	4
WC	(Switzerland) B Bencic	4	3^{r}
(Kazakhstan) Y Putintseva	6	2
(Czech Republic) B Strýcová	6	7
(Russia) E Makarova	3	5
Q	(Greece) M Sakkari	4	0
9	(Italy) R Vinci	6	6
8	(Russia) E Vesnina	2	0^{r}
(United States) C Vandeweghe	6	4
LL	(United States) I Falconi	5	6	0
Q	(China) Y Duan	7	3	6
Q	(Ukraine) K Bondarenko	6	5	2
Q	(United States) C McHale	4	7	6

Second round
10	(Denmark) C Wozniacki	6	7
(Kazakhstan) Y Putintseva	0	5
(Czech Republic) B Strýcová	6	6
9	(Italy) R Vinci	2	3
(United States) C Vandeweghe	3	2
Q	(China) Y Duan	6	6
Q	(United States) C McHale	6^{1}	1
2	(Poland) A Radwańska	7^{7}	6

Quarterfinals
10	(Denmark) C Wozniacki	5	7^{8}	4
(Czech Republic) B Strýcová	7	6^{6}	6
Q	(China) Y Duan	3	2
2	(Poland) A Radwańska	6	6

Semifinals
(Czech Republic) B Strýcová	1	2
2	(Poland) A Radwańska	6	6

== Qualifying ==
=== Seeds ===
1. (Kazakhstan) Yaroslava Shvedova (first round)
2. (United States) Christina McHale (qualified)
3. (Bulgaria) Tsvetana Pironkova (second round, retired)
4. (United States) Louisa Chirico (first round)
5. (Ukraine) Kateryna Bondarenko (qualified)
6. (Montenegro) Danka Kovinić (second round)
7. (France) Océane Dodin (first round)
8. (United States) Vania King (second round)

=== Qualifiers ===
1. (Ukraine) Kateryna Bondarenko
2. (United States) Christina McHale
3. (Greece) Maria Sakkari
4. (China) Duan Yingying

=== Lucky losers ===
1. (United States) Irina Falconi
2. (Australia) Arina Rodionova
3. (Croatia) Donna Vekić

=== Draw ===
==== First qualifier ====
First round
1	(Kazakhstan) Yaroslava Shvedova	1	4
(United Kingdom) Naomi Broady	6	6
WC	(Australia) Ellen Perez	6	6
(Ukraine) Kateryna Kozlova	4	4
(China) Zheng Saisai	2	6^{4}
(Croatia) Mirjana Lučić-Baroni	6	7^{7}
(Bulgaria) Viktoriya Tomova	3	6	1
5	(Ukraine) Kateryna Bondarenko	6	3	6

Second round
(United Kingdom) Naomi Broady	6	6^{3}	6
WC	(Australia) Ellen Perez	4	7^{7}	3
(Croatia) Mirjana Lučić-Baroni	6	3	3
5	(Ukraine) Kateryna Bondarenko	3	6	6

Qualifying competition
(United Kingdom) Naomi Broady	1	1
5	(Ukraine) Kateryna Bondarenko	6	6

==== Second qualifier ====
First round
2	(United States) Christina McHale	6	6
(United States) Jennifer Brady	1	3
(Poland) Magda Linette	6	3	5
(Slovakia) Kristína Kučová	3	6	7
(Germany) Carina Witthöft	6	6
(Czech Republic) Denisa Allertová	2	1
(United States) Irina Falconi	7	6
7	(France) Océane Dodin	5	4

Second round
2	(United States) Christina McHale	6	6
(Slovakia) Kristína Kučová	2	1
(Germany) Carina Witthöft	4	2
(United States) Irina Falconi	6	6

Qualifying competition
2	(United States) Christina McHale	6	6
(United States) Irina Falconi	1	3

==== Third qualifier ====
First round
3	(Bulgaria) Tsvetana Pironkova	7^{7}	6
(Romania) Patricia Maria Țig	6^{4}	3
(Greece) Maria Sakkari	6	7^{7}
(Russia) Evgeniya Rodina	3	6^{4}
(Czech Republic) Barbora Štefková	5	2
(Croatia) Donna Vekić	7	6
WC	(Australia) Olivia Tjandramulia	2	1
8	(United States) Vania King	6	6

Second round
3	(Bulgaria) Tsvetana Pironkova	3	0^{r}
(Greece) Maria Sakkari	6	2
(Croatia) Donna Vekić	6	2	7
8	(United States) Vania King	2	6	5

Qualifying competition
(Greece) Maria Sakkari	6	6
(Croatia) Donna Vekić	3	4

==== Fourth qualifier ====
First round
4	(United States) Louisa Chirico	6	2	5
(Slovakia) Jana Čepelová	2	6	7
(United States) Varvara Lepchenko	1	4
(China) Duan Yingying	6	6
WC	(Australia) Abbie Myers	5	6	2
WC	(Australia) Arina Rodionova	7	3	6
(Germany) Mona Barthel	1	6	4
6	(Montenegro) Danka Kovinić	6	1	6

Second round
(Slovakia) Jana Čepelová
(China) Duan Yingying	w/o
WC	(Australia) Arina Rodionova	6	6
6	(Montenegro) Danka Kovinić	3	1

Qualifying competition
(China) Duan Yingying	4	7	7^{7}
WC	(Australia) Arina Rodionova	6	5	6^{2}

== See also ==
- 2017 Australian Open Series
