= 2017 Apia International Sydney – Men's doubles =

Men's doubles
- 2017 Apia International Sydney

Final
- Champions: (Netherlands) Wesley Koolhof (Netherlands) Matwé Middelkoop
- Runners-up: (United Kingdom) Jamie Murray (Brazil) Bruno Soares
- Score: 6–3, 7–5

Events
Singles	men	women
Doubles	men	women
← 2016 ·	Sydney International	· 2018 →

Jamie Murray and Bruno Soares were the defending champions, but lost in the final to Wesley Koolhof and Matwé Middelkoop, 3–6, 5–7.

== Seeds ==
1. (United Kingdom) Jamie Murray / (Brazil) Bruno Soares (final)
2. (Spain) Marcel Granollers / (Spain) Marc López (first round)
3. (Poland) Łukasz Kubot / (Brazil) Marcelo Melo (first round)
4. (Netherlands) Jean-Julien Rojer / (Romania) Horia Tecău (quarterfinals)

== Draw ==
=== Key ===
- Q = Qualifier
- WC = Wild card
- LL = Lucky loser
- Alt = Alternate
- SE = Special exempt
- PR = Protected ranking
- ITF = ITF entry
- JE = Junior exempt
- w/o = Walkover
- r = Retired
- d = Defaulted
- SR = Special ranking

=== Draw ===
First round
1	(United Kingdom) J Murray (Brazil) B Soares	w/o
(Spain) N Almagro (Italy) P Lorenzi
(India) R Bopanna (Uruguay) P Cuevas	6^{5}	7^{7}	[9]
(Germany) F Mayer (Germany) P Petzschner	7^{7}	6^{4}	[11]
3	(Poland) Ł Kubot (Brazil) M Melo	6^{3}	6	[5]
(Colombia) JS Cabal (Colombia) R Farah	7^{7}	4	[10]
(Serbia) V Troicki (Serbia) N Zimonjić	6	6
(Poland) M Fyrstenberg (Slovakia) M Kližan	3	4
(Austria) O Marach (France) F Martin	2^{r}
(Netherlands) W Koolhof (Netherlands) M Middelkoop	4
WC	(Australia) M Reid (Australia) J Thompson	6	4	[5]
4	(Netherlands) J-J Rojer (Romania) H Tecău	2	6	[10]
Alt	(Sweden) J Brunström (Sweden) A Siljeström	1	4
(Croatia) M Pavić (Austria) A Peya	6	6
(Spain) P Carreño Busta (Italy) F Fognini	6	7^{7}
2	(Spain) M Granollers (Spain) M López	3	6^{5}

Quarterfinals
1	(United Kingdom) J Murray (Brazil) B Soares	6	6
(Germany) F Mayer (Germany) P Petzschner	3	4
(Colombia) JS Cabal (Colombia) R Farah	6	6
(Serbia) V Troicki (Serbia) N Zimonjić	4	2
(Netherlands) W Koolhof (Netherlands) M Middelkoop	7^{7}	2	[11]
4	(Netherlands) J-J Rojer (Romania) H Tecău	6^{4}	6	[9]
(Croatia) M Pavić (Austria) A Peya	6	6
(Spain) P Carreño Busta (Italy) F Fognini	3	4

Semifinals
1	(United Kingdom) J Murray (Brazil) B Soares	6	7^{7}
(Colombia) JS Cabal (Colombia) R Farah	3	6^{4}
(Netherlands) W Koolhof (Netherlands) M Middelkoop	6	3	[10]
(Croatia) M Pavić (Austria) A Peya	3	6	[8]

Final
1	(United Kingdom) J Murray (Brazil) B Soares	3	5
(Netherlands) W Koolhof (Netherlands) M Middelkoop	6	7
