= Höferlin =

Höferlin is a surname. Notable people with the surname include:

- Julien Hoferlin (1966–2016), Belgian tennis coach
- Manuel Höferlin (born 1973), German politician
