= 2009 Davis Cup Europe/Africa Zone Group I =

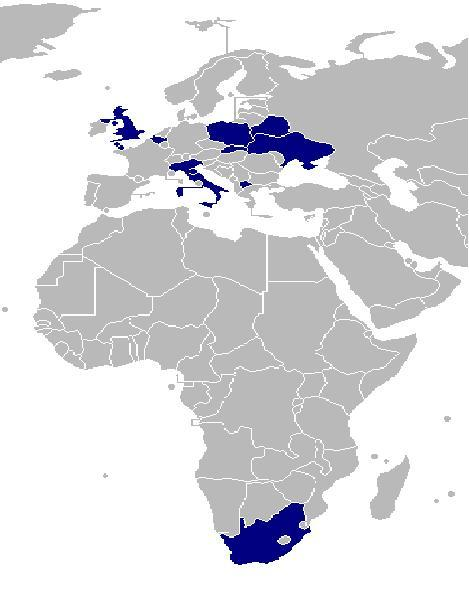
Countries participating in the 2009 Davis Cup Europe/Africa Zone Group I

The European and African Zone is one of the three zones of regional Davis Cup competition in 2009.

In the European and African Zone there are four different groups in which teams compete against each other to advance to the next group.

== Participating teams ==
- Belarus
- Belgium
- Great Britain
- Italy
- Macedonia
- Poland
- Slovakia
- South Africa
- Ukraine

== Draw ==
Second Round Play-offs
Bratislava, Slovakia (indoor hard)
Slovakia	5
Macedonia	0
Liverpool, Great Britain (indoor hard)
Great Britain	2
Poland	3

First Round Play-offs
Slovakia
bye
Minsk, Belarus (hard)
Belarus	4
Macedonia	1
bye
Great Britain
Poland
bye

First Round
Slovakia
bye
Italy
bye
Belarus
bye
Johannesburg, South Africa (hard)
South Africa	5
Macedonia	0
bye
Ukraine
bye
Great Britain
bye
Poland
bye
Belgium

Second Round
Cagliari, Italy (clay)
Slovakia	1
Italy	4
Johannesburg, South Africa (hard)
Belarus	0
South Africa	5
Renfrewshire, Great Britain (indoor hard)
Ukraine	4
Great Britain	1
Liège, Belgium (clay)
Poland	1
Belgium	4

- Macedonia and Great Britain relegated to Group II in 2010.
- Italy, South Africa,Ukraine, and Belgium advance to World Group Play-off.

== First Round Matches ==
=== South Africa vs. Macedonia ===
South Africa
5
Emperors Palace, Johannesburg, South Africa
6–8 March 2009
hard (outdoor)

Macedonia
0

			1	2	3	4	5
1	(South Africa) (North Macedonia)	Izak van der Merwe; Predrag Rusevski	2; 6	6; 2	6; 2	6; 4
2	(South Africa) (North Macedonia)	Rik de Voest; Lazar Magdinčev	6; 3	6; 2	6; 1
3	(South Africa) (North Macedonia)	Jeff Coetzee / Rik de Voest; Lazar Magdinčev / Predrag Rusevski	6; 1	7^{7} 6^{1}	6; 2
4	(South Africa) (North Macedonia)	Raven Klaasen; Ilija Martinoski	6; 2	6; 2
5	(South Africa) (North Macedonia)	Izak van der Merwe; Dimitar Grabuloski	6; 4	6; 0

== Second Round Matches ==
=== Slovakia vs. Italy ===
Slovakia
1
Tennis Club Cagliari, Cagliari, Italy
6–8 March 2009
clay (outdoor)

Italy
4

			1	2	3	4	5
1	(Slovakia) (Italy)	Dominik Hrbatý; Potito Starace	1; 6	2; 6	4; 6
2	(Slovakia) (Italy)	Lukáš Lacko; Fabio Fognini	6; 1	3; 6	2; 6	6; 1	1; 6
3	(Slovakia) (Italy)	Michal Mertiňák / Filip Polášek; Flavio Cipolla / Potito Starace	7; 5	4; 6	6; 0	2; 6	9; 7
4	(Slovakia) (Italy)	Dominik Hrbatý; Fabio Fognini	6^{1} 7^{7}	1; 6	3; 6
5	(Slovakia) (Italy)	Lukáš Lacko; Flavio Cipolla	2; 6	5; 7

=== Belarus vs. South Africa ===
Belarus
0
Arthur Ashe Tennis Centre, Johannesburg, South Africa
8–10 May 2009
hard (outdoor)

South Africa
5

			1	2	3	4	5
1	(Belarus) (South Africa)	Uladzimir Ignatik; Izak van der Merwe	4; 6	3; 4				retired
2	(Belarus) (South Africa)	Andrei Karatchenia; Rik de Voest	1; 6	4; 6	1; 6
3	(Belarus) (South Africa)	Siarhei Betau / Max Mirnyi; Jeff Coetzee / Rik de Voest	3; 6	4; 6	6^{5} 7^{7}
4	(Belarus) (South Africa)	Siarhei Betau; Raven Klaasen	1; 6	4; 6
5	(Belarus) (South Africa)	Andrei Karatchenia; Izak van der Merwe	1; 6	3; 6

=== Ukraine vs. Great Britain ===
Ukraine
4
Braehead Arena, Renfrewshire, Scotland, Great Britain
6–8 March 2009
hard (indoor)

Great Britain
1

			1	2	3	4	5
1	(Ukraine) (United Kingdom)	Illya Marchenko; Josh Goodall	7^{7} 6^{2}	7^{7} 6^{5}	7^{7} 6^{5}
2	(Ukraine) (United Kingdom)	Sergiy Stakhovsky; Chris Eaton	6; 3	3; 6	6; 3	6; 4
3	(Ukraine) (United Kingdom)	Sergei Bubka / Sergiy Stakhovsky; Colin Fleming / Ross Hutchins	6; 4	3; 6	6; 3	5; 7	6; 4
4	(Ukraine) (United Kingdom)	Ivan Sergeyev; Josh Goodall	7^{7} 6^{3}	6; 3
5	(Ukraine) (United Kingdom)	Illya Marchenko; Chris Eaton	3; 6	6; 4	6^{5} 7^{7}

=== Poland vs. Belgium ===
Poland
1
Country Hall du Sart-Tilman, Liège, Belgium
6–8 March 2009
clay (indoor)

Belgium
4

			1	2	3	4	5
1	(Poland) (Belgium)	Michał Przysiężny; Kristof Vliegen	6; 1	3; 6	4; 6	6; 1	3; 6
2	(Poland) (Belgium)	Jerzy Janowicz; Xavier Malisse	6; 7	3; 6	3; 6
3	(Poland) (Belgium)	Marcin Matkowski / Grzegorz Panfil; Steve Darcis / Olivier Rochus	3; 6	6^{1} 7^{7}	3; 6
4	(Poland) (Belgium)	Jerzy Janowicz; Kristof Vliegen	6; 2	6; 4
5	(Poland) (Belgium)	Grzegorz Panfil; Xavier Malisse	3; 6	2; 6

== First Round Play-offs Matches ==
=== Belarus vs. Macedonia ===
Belarus
4
Republic Olympic Training Center for Tennis, Minsk, Belarus
10–12 July 2009
hard (outdoor)

Macedonia
1

			1	2	3	4	5
1	(Belarus) (North Macedonia)	Andrei Vasilevski; Dimitar Grabuloski	7; 5	7^{7} 6^{2}	3; 6	6^{5} 7^{7}	3; 6
2	(Belarus) (North Macedonia)	Uladzimir Ignatik; Lazar Magdinčev	6; 2	7; 5	6; 3
3	(Belarus) (North Macedonia)	Alexander Bury / Max Mirnyi; Dimitar Grabuloski / Lazar Magdinčev	6; 1	7^{7} 6^{2}	6; 1
4	(Belarus) (North Macedonia)	Uladzimir Ignatik; Dimitar Grabuloski	6; 3	6; 1	6; 4
5	(Belarus) (North Macedonia)	Andrei Vasilevski; Lazar Magdinčev	6; 4	6; 2

== Second Round Play-offs Matches ==
=== Slovakia vs. Macedonia ===
Slovakia
5
Sibamac Arena, Bratislava, Slovakia
18–20 September 2009
Hard (Indoor)

Macedonia
0

			1	2	3	4	5
1	(Slovakia) (North Macedonia)	Dominik Hrbatý; Dimitar Grabuloski	6; 2	6; 4	6; 4
2	(Slovakia) (North Macedonia)	Lukáš Lacko; Lazar Magdinčev	6; 1	6; 1	6; 3
3	(Slovakia) (North Macedonia)	Martin Kližan / Filip Polášek; Dimitar Grabuloski / Lazar Magdinčev	6; 3	6; 3	6; 3
4	(Slovakia) (North Macedonia)	Lukáš Lacko; Shendrit Deari	6; 3	6; 0
5	(Slovakia) (North Macedonia)	Dominik Hrbatý; Tomislav Jotovski	6; 0	6; 0

=== Great Britain vs. Poland ===
Great Britain
2
Echo Arena, Liverpool, England, Great Britain
18–20 September 2009
Hard (Indoor)

Poland
3

			1	2	3	4	5
1	(United Kingdom) (Poland)	Andy Murray; Michał Przysiężny	6; 4	6; 2	6; 4
2	(United Kingdom) (Poland)	Daniel Evans; Jerzy Janowicz	3; 6	3; 6	6^{5} 7^{7}
3	(United Kingdom) (Poland)	Ross Hutchins / Andy Murray; Mariusz Fyrstenberg / Marcin Matkowski	5; 7	6; 3	3; 6	2; 6
4	(United Kingdom) (Poland)	Andy Murray; Jerzy Janowicz	6; 3	6; 4	6; 3
5	(United Kingdom) (Poland)	Daniel Evans; Michał Przysiężny	2; 6	1; 6	5; 7
