= 2018 Sydney International – Men's singles =

Men's singles
- 2018 Sydney International

Final
- Champion: (Russia) Daniil Medvedev
- Runner-up: (Australia) Alex de Minaur
- Score: 1–6, 6–4, 7–5

Details
- Draw: 28 (4 Q / 3 WC )
- Seeds: 8

Events
Singles	men	women
Doubles	men	women
← 2017 ·	Sydney International	· 2019 →

Gilles Müller was the defending champion, but lost in the quarterfinals to Benoît Paire.

Daniil Medvedev won his first ATP title, defeating Alex de Minaur in the final, 1–6, 6–4, 7–5.

== Seeds ==
The top four seeds receive a bye into the second round.

1. (Spain) Albert Ramos Viñolas (second round)
2. (Luxembourg) Gilles Müller (quarterfinals)
3. (Argentina) Diego Schwartzman (second round)
4. (Italy) Fabio Fognini (semifinals)
5. (France) Adrian Mannarino (quarterfinals)
6. (Germany) Philipp Kohlschreiber (first round)
7. (Bosnia and Herzegovina) Damir Džumhur (second round, retired)
8. (Germany) Mischa Zverev (first round)

== Draw ==
=== Finals ===
Semifinals
Q	(Russia) Daniil Medvedev	2	6	6
4	(Italy) Fabio Fognini	6	4	1
SE	(Australia) Alex de Minaur	4	6	6
(France) Benoît Paire	6	1	1

Final
Q	(Russia) Daniil Medvedev	1	6	7
SE	(Australia) Alex de Minaur	6	4	5

=== Top half ===
First round
(Italy) P Lorenzi	7^{7}	6
WC	(Australia) J Thompson	6^{5}	4
SE	(France) G Simon	1	4
(United States) J Donaldson	6	6
Q	(Russia) D Medvedev	6	6
6	(Germany) P Kohlschreiber	2	3
(Ukraine) A Dolgopolov	6	6^{6}	7
(Serbia) V Troicki	3	7^{8}	5
WC	(Australia) A Bolt	7	5	4
LL	(Lithuania) R Berankis	5	7	6
Q	(Russia) E Donskoy	7	5	4
5	(France) A Mannarino	5	7	6

Second round
1	(Spain) A Ramos Viñolas	3	5
(Italy) P Lorenzi	6	7
(United States) J Donaldson	3	6	5
Q	(Russia) D Medvedev	6	4	7
4	(Italy) F Fognini	3	6	6
(Ukraine) A Dolgopolov	6	3	4
LL	(Lithuania) R Berankis	2	1
5	(France) A Mannarino	6	6

Quarterfinals
(Italy) P Lorenzi	3	3
Q	(Russia) D Medvedev	6	6
4	(Italy) F Fognini	6^{4}	7^{7}	6
5	(France) A Mannarino	7^{7}	6^{4}	2

Semifinals
Q	(Russia) D Medvedev	2	6	6
4	(Italy) F Fognini	6	4	1

=== Bottom half ===
First round
7	(Bosnia and Herzegovina) D Džumhur	6	6
(Germany) J-L Struff	1	4
SE	(Australia) A de Minaur	6	6
(Spain) F Verdasco	4	2
Q	(Australia) A Vukic	6	6^{5}	3
(Spain) F López	4	7^{7}	6
8	(Germany) M Zverev	5	3
(Argentina) L Mayer	7	6
(Slovenia) A Bedene	6	6^{5}	3
(France) B Paire	1	7^{7}	6
Q	(Australia) A Popyrin	6^{4}	0
WC	(Australia) J Millman	7^{7}	6

Second round
7	(Bosnia and Herzegovina) D Džumhur	2	0^{r}
SE	(Australia) A de Minaur	6	3
(Spain) F López	6	7^{7}
3	(Argentina) D Schwartzman	3	6^{1}
(Argentina) L Mayer	2	6	1
(France) B Paire	6	3	6
WC	(Australia) J Millman	6^{5}	4
2	(Luxembourg) G Müller	7^{7}	6

Quarterfinals
SE	(Australia) A de Minaur	6	6
(Spain) F López	4	4
(France) B Paire	6	6
2	(Luxembourg) G Müller	4	4

Semifinals
SE	(Australia) A de Minaur	4	6	6
(France) B Paire	6	1	1

== Qualifying ==
=== Seeds ===
1. (Russia) Daniil Medvedev (qualified)
2. (Argentina) Federico Delbonis (first round)
3. (Russia) Evgeny Donskoy (qualified)
4. (Serbia) Dušan Lajović (first round)
5. (France) Nicolas Mahut (qualifying competition)
6. (Lithuania) Ričardas Berankis (qualifying competition, lucky loser)
7. (Czech Republic) Václav Šafránek (qualifying competition)
8. (Russia) Teymuraz Gabashvili (qualifying competition, retired)

=== Qualifiers ===
1. (Russia) Daniil Medvedev
2. (Australia) Alexei Popyrin
3. (Russia) Evgeny Donskoy
4. (Australia) Aleksandar Vukic

=== Lucky loser ===
1. (Lithuania) Ričardas Berankis

=== Qualifying draw ===
==== First qualifier ====
First round
1	(Russia) Daniil Medvedev	6	6
(Russia) Alexander Zhurbin	1	2
Alt	(France) Fabrice Martin	1	2
7	(Czech Republic) Václav Šafránek	6	6

Qualifying competition
1	(Russia) Daniil Medvedev	6	6
7	(Czech Republic) Václav Šafránek	2	4

==== Second qualifier ====
First round
2	(Argentina) Federico Delbonis	6	3	3
WC	(Australia) Alexei Popyrin	4	6	6
WC	(Australia) Christopher O'Connell	6	4	4
5	(France) Nicolas Mahut	2	6	6

Qualifying competition
WC	(Australia) Alexei Popyrin	4	7^{7}	6
5	(France) Nicolas Mahut	6	6^{4}	4

==== Third qualifier ====
First round
3	(Russia) Evgeny Donskoy	6	6
Alt	(United States) Nicholas Monroe	3	4
(Russia) Vladimir Polyakov
8	(Russia) Teymuraz Gabashvili	w/o

Qualifying competition
3	(Russia) Evgeny Donskoy	6
8	(Russia) Teymuraz Gabashvili	5^{r}

==== Fourth qualifier ====
First round
4	(Serbia) Dušan Lajović	5	6^{5}
(Australia) Aleksandar Vukic	7	7^{7}
(Australia) Matthew Barton	5	3
6	(Lithuania) Ričardas Berankis	7	6

Qualifying competition
(Australia) Aleksandar Vukic	7	6
6	(Lithuania) Ričardas Berankis	5	2
