= 2018 Sydney International – Women's doubles =

Women's doubles
- 2018 Sydney International

Final
- Champions: (Canada) Gabriela Dabrowski (China) Xu Yifan
- Runners-up: (Chinese Taipei) Latisha Chan (Czech Republic) Andrea Sestini Hlaváčková
- Score: 6–3, 6–1

Events
Singles	men	women
Doubles	men	women
← 2017 ·	Sydney International	· 2019 →

Tímea Babos and Anastasia Pavlyuchenkova were the defending champions, but chose not to participate this year.

Gabriela Dabrowski and Xu Yifan won the title, defeating Latisha Chan and Andrea Sestini Hlaváčková in the final, 6–3, 6–1.

== Seeds ==
1. (Chinese Taipei) Latisha Chan / (Czech Republic) Andrea Sestini Hlaváčková (final)
2. (Czech Republic) Lucie Šafářová / (Czech Republic) Barbora Strýcová (semifinals, withdrew)
3. (Canada) Gabriela Dabrowski / (China) Xu Yifan (champions)
4. (Netherlands) Kiki Bertens / (Sweden) Johanna Larsson (quarterfinals)

== Draw ==
=== Key ===
- Q = Qualifier
- WC = Wild card
- LL = Lucky loser
- Alt = Alternate
- SE = Special exempt
- PR = Protected ranking
- ITF = ITF entry
- JE = Junior exempt
- w/o = Walkover
- r = Retired
- d = Defaulted
- SR = Special ranking

=== Draw ===
First round
1	(Chinese Taipei) L Chan (Czech Republic) A Sestini Hlaváčková	6	4	[10]
PR	(Spain) A Parra Santonja (Czech Republic) R Voráčová	2	6	[3]
(Slovenia) A Klepač (Spain) MJ Martínez Sánchez	6	6
PR	(Germany) A-L Grönefeld (United States) V King	1	1
4	(Netherlands) K Bertens (Sweden) J Larsson	6	7
(Chinese Taipei) H-c Chan (Slovenia) K Srebotnik	4	5
Alt	(Spain) L Arruabarrena (United States) L Davis	6	7
(Ukraine) N Kichenok (Australia) An Rodionova	3	5
(Chinese Taipei) S-w Hsieh (China) S Peng	4	2
(Japan) S Aoyama (China) Z Yang	6	6
(Australia) M Adamczak (Australia) S Sanders	6^{5}	5
3	(Canada) G Dabrowski (China) Y Xu	7^{7}	7
(Ukraine) K Bondarenko (Australia) C Dellacqua	1	6	[10]
(Latvia) J Ostapenko (United States) S Stephens	6	4	[8]
(Poland) A Rosolska (United States) A Spears	6	0	[8]
2	(Czech Republic) L Šafářová (Czech Republic) B Strýcová	4	6	[10]

Quarterfinals
1	(Chinese Taipei) L Chan (Czech Republic) A Sestini Hlaváčková	7^{7}	1	[10]
(Slovenia) A Klepač (Spain) MJ Martínez Sánchez	6^{3}	6	[6]
4	(Netherlands) K Bertens (Sweden) J Larsson	6^{4}	6	[7]
Alt	(Spain) L Arruabarrena (United States) L Davis	7^{7}	2	[10]
(Japan) S Aoyama (China) Z Yang	4	5
3	(Canada) G Dabrowski (China) Y Xu	6	7
(Ukraine) K Bondarenko (Australia) C Dellacqua	4	6	[7]
2	(Czech Republic) L Šafářová (Czech Republic) B Strýcová	6	3	[10]

Semifinals
1	(Chinese Taipei) L Chan (Czech Republic) A Sestini Hlaváčková	6	6
Alt	(Spain) L Arruabarrena (United States) L Davis	2	4
3	(Canada) G Dabrowski (China) Y Xu	w/o
2	(Czech Republic) L Šafářová (Czech Republic) B Strýcová

Final
1	(Chinese Taipei) L Chan (Czech Republic) A Sestini Hlaváčková	3	1
3	(Canada) G Dabrowski (China) Y Xu	6	6
