= 2017 Apia International Sydney – Women's doubles =

Women's doubles
- 2017 Apia International Sydney

Final
- Champions: (Hungary) Tímea Babos (Russia) Anastasia Pavlyuchenkova
- Runners-up: (India) Sania Mirza (Czech Republic) Barbora Strýcová
- Score: 6–4, 6–4

Events
Singles	men	women
Doubles	men	women
← 2016 ·	Apia International Sydney	· 2018 →

Martina Hingis and Sania Mirza were the defending champions, but chose not to participate together this year. Hingis played alongside Coco Vandeweghe, but lost in the quarterfinals to Tímea Babos and Anastasia Pavlyuchenkova. Mirza teamed up with Barbora Strýcová, but lost in the final to Babos and Pavlyuchenkova, 4–6, 4–6.

== Seeds ==
1. (India) Sania Mirza / (Czech Republic) Barbora Strýcová (final)
2. (Switzerland) Martina Hingis / (United States) Coco Vandeweghe (quarterfinals)
3. (Chinese Taipei) Chan Hao-ching / (Chinese Taipei) Chan Yung-jan (first round)
4. (United States) Vania King / (Kazakhstan) Yaroslava Shvedova (semifinals)

== Draw ==
=== Key ===
- Q = Qualifier
- WC = Wild card
- LL = Lucky loser
- Alt = Alternate
- SE = Special exempt
- PR = Protected ranking
- ITF = ITF entry
- JE = Junior exempt
- w/o = Walkover
- r = Retired
- d = Defaulted
- SR = Special ranking

First round
1	(India) S Mirza (Czech Republic) B Strýcová	5	6	[10]
(Czech Republic) A Hlaváčková (China) S Peng	7	1	[5]
WC	(United States) M Brengle (Australia) Ar Rodionova	6	6^{5}	[10]
(Georgia (country)) O Kalashnikova (Czech Republic) B Krejčíková	1	7^{7}	[8]
4	(United States) V King (Kazakhstan) Y Shvedova	6	6
(Croatia) D Jurak (Australia) An Rodionova	2	3
(Slovenia) K Srebotnik (China) S Zheng	3	7^{7}	[7]
(Germany) A-L Grönefeld (Czech Republic) K Peschke	6	6^{3}	[10]
PR	(United States) L Huber (United States) M Sanchez	6	4	[7]
(Australia) D Gavrilova (Russia) D Kasatkina	1	6	[10]
(Slovenia) A Klepač (Spain) MJ Martínez Sánchez	6	6
3	(Chinese Taipei) H-c Chan (Chinese Taipei) Y-j Chan	2	2
(United States) R Atawo (China) Y Xu	3	2
(Hungary) T Babos (Russia) A Pavlyuchenkova	6	6
(Ukraine) K Bondarenko (Kazakhstan) Y Putintseva	2	3
2	(Switzerland) M Hingis (United States) C Vandeweghe	6	6

Quarterfinals
1	(India) S Mirza (Czech Republic) B Strýcová	6	6
WC	(United States) M Brengle (Australia) Ar Rodionova	3	4
4	(United States) V King (Kazakhstan) Y Shvedova	7	6
(Germany) A-L Grönefeld (Czech Republic) K Peschke	5	3
(Australia) D Gavrilova (Russia) D Kasatkina
(Slovenia) A Klepač (Spain) MJ Martínez Sánchez	w/o
(Hungary) T Babos (Russia) A Pavlyuchenkova	7^{9}	6
2	(Switzerland) M Hingis (United States) C Vandeweghe	6^{7}	4

Semifinals
1	(India) S Mirza (Czech Republic) B Strýcová	6	6
4	(United States) V King (Kazakhstan) Y Shvedova	1	2
(Slovenia) A Klepač (Spain) MJ Martínez Sánchez	3	4
(Hungary) T Babos (Russia) A Pavlyuchenkova	6	6

Final
1	(India) S Mirza (Czech Republic) B Strýcová	4	4
(Hungary) T Babos (Russia) A Pavlyuchenkova	6	6
