= 2017 Apia International Sydney =

- Date: 8–14 January 2017
- Edition: 125th
- Category: ATP World Tour 250 series / WTA Premier
- Draw: 32S / 16D
- Prize money: $495,630 (men) $776,000 (women)
- Surface: Hard
- Location: Sydney, Australia
- Venue: NSW Tennis Centre

Champions

Men's singles
- (Luxembourg) Gilles Müller

Women's singles
- (United Kingdom) Johanna Konta

Men's doubles
- (Netherlands) Wesley Koolhof / (Netherlands) Matwé Middelkoop

Women's doubles
- (Hungary) Tímea Babos / (Russia) Anastasia Pavlyuchenkova
- Sydney International

The 2017 Apia International Sydney was a joint 2017 ATP World Tour and 2017 WTA Tour tennis tournament, played on outdoor hard courts in Sydney, New South Wales (NSW). It was the 124th edition of the tournament and took place at the NSW Tennis Centre in Sydney, Australia. It was held from 8 January through 14 January 2017 as part of the Australian Open Series in preparation for the first Grand Slam of the year.

The women's main-draw ranking cut-off was 29, making it the highest cut-off of any WTA tournament in the world in the past year.

== Point distribution ==
Event	W	F	SF	QF	Round of 16	Round of 32	Q	Q3	Q2	Q1
Men's singles	250	150	90	45	20	0	12	6	0	0
Men's doubles	250	150	90	45	0	—N/a	—N/a	—N/a	—N/a	—N/a
Women's singles	470	305	185	100	55	1	25	18	13	1
Women's doubles	470	305	185	100	1	—N/a	—N/a	—N/a	—N/a	—N/a

== Prize money ==
Event	W	F	SF	QF	Round of 16	Round of 32^{1}	Q3	Q2	Q1
Men's singles	$72,000	$37,900	$20,545	$11,705	$6,900	$4,085	$1,840	$920	—N/a
Men's doubles*	$21,850	$11,500	$6,230	$3,570	$2,090	—N/a	—N/a	—N/a	—N/a
Women's singles	$132,740	$70,870	$37,825	$20,315	$10,900	$5,970	$3,110	$1,650	$915
Women's doubles*	$41,520	$22,180	$12,120	$6,165	$3,340	—N/a	—N/a	—N/a	—N/a

_{^{1}Qualifiers prize money is also the Round of 32 prize money.}
_{*per team}

== ATP singles main-draw entrants ==
=== Seeds ===
Country	Player	Rank^{1}	Seed
AUT	Dominic Thiem	8	1
URU	Pablo Cuevas	22	2
SRB	Viktor Troicki	29	3
ESP	Pablo Carreño Busta	30	4
GER	Philipp Kohlschreiber	32	5
LUX	Gilles Müller	34	6
SVK	Martin Kližan	35	7
ESP	Marcel Granollers	37	8

- ^{1} Rankings as of January 2, 2017

=== Other entrants ===
The following players received wildcards into the singles main draw:

- (Australia) Alex de Minaur
- (Australia) ~~Thanasi Kokkinakis~~
- (Australia) Jordan Thompson

The following players received entry from the qualifying draw:

- (Australia) Matthew Barton
- (Portugal) Gastão Elias
- (Brazil) Thiago Monteiro
- (Australia) Christopher O'Connell

The following players received entry by a lucky loser:

- (Georgia (country)) Nikoloz Basilashvili
- (Colombia) Santiago Giraldo

=== Withdrawals ===
Before the tournament

- (Argentina) Federico Delbonis → replaced by (Brazil) Thomaz Bellucci
- (Australia) Thanasi Kokkinakis (abdominal injury) → replaced by (Georgia (country)) Nikoloz Basilashvili
- (Spain) Fernando Verdasco (fatigue) → replaced by (Colombia) Santiago Giraldo

== ATP doubles main-draw entrants ==
=== Seeds ===
Country	Player	Country	Player	Rank^{1}	Seed
GBR	Jamie Murray	BRA	Bruno Soares	7	1
ESP	Marcel Granollers	ESP	Marc López	28	2
POL	Łukasz Kubot	BRA	Marcelo Melo	32	3
NED	Jean-Julien Rojer	ROM	Horia Tecău	46	4

- ^{1} Rankings as of January 2, 2017

=== Other entrants ===
The following pair received wildcard into the doubles main draw:

- (Australia) Matt Reid / (Australia) Jordan Thompson

== WTA singles main-draw entrants ==
=== Seeds ===
Country	Player	Rank^{1}	Seed
GER	Angelique Kerber	1	1
POL	Agnieszka Radwańska	3	2
SVK	Dominika Cibulková	5	3
RUS	Svetlana Kuznetsova	9	4
GBR	Johanna Konta	10	5
RUS	Elena Vesnina	16	6
ITA	Roberta Vinci	18	7
DEN	Caroline Wozniacki	19	8

- ^{1} Rankings as of January 2, 2017

=== Other entrants ===
The following players received wildcards into the singles main draw:

- (Switzerland) Belinda Bencic
- (Canada) Eugenie Bouchard

The following players received entry from the qualifying draw:

- (Ukraine) Kateryna Bondarenko
- (China) Duan Yingying
- (United States) Christina McHale
- (Greece) Maria Sakkari

The following players received entry by a lucky loser:

- (United States) Irina Falconi
- (Australia) Arina Rodionova
- (Croatia) Donna Vekić

=== Withdrawals ===
Before the tournament

- (France) Caroline Garcia → replaced by (Puerto Rico) Monica Puig
- (Czech Republic) Petra Kvitová (off-court injury) → replaced by (Russia) Ekaterina Makarova
- (Czech Republic) Karolína Plíšková (left thigh injury) → replaced by (United States) Irina Falconi
- (United States) Sloane Stephens (left foot injury) → replaced by (Australia) Arina Rodionova
- (Spain) Carla Suárez Navarro → replaced by (Germany) Laura Siegemund
- (Ukraine) Elina Svitolina (viral illness) → replaced by (Croatia) Donna Vekić

== WTA doubles main-draw entrants ==
=== Seeds ===
Country	Player	Country	Player	Rank^{1}	Seed
IND	Sania Mirza	CZE	Barbora Strýcová	18	1
SUI	Martina Hingis	USA	CoCo Vandeweghe	22	2
TPE	Chan Hao-ching	TPE	Chan Yung-jan	24	3
USA	Vania King	KAZ	Yaroslava Shvedova	37	4

- ^{1} Rankings as of January 2, 2017

=== Other entrants ===
The following players received wildcards into the doubles main draw:

- (United States) Madison Brengle / (Australia) Arina Rodionova

== Champions ==
=== Men's singles ===
- (Luxembourg) Gilles Müller def. (United Kingdom) Daniel Evans, 7–6^{(7–5)}, 6–2

=== Women's singles ===
- (United Kingdom) Johanna Konta def. (Poland) Agnieszka Radwańska, 6–4, 6–2

=== Men's doubles ===
- (Netherlands) Wesley Koolhof / (Netherlands) Matwé Middelkoop def. (United Kingdom) Jamie Murray / (Brazil) Bruno Soares, 6–3, 7–5

=== Women's doubles ===
- (Hungary) Tímea Babos / (Russia) Anastasia Pavlyuchenkova def. (India) Sania Mirza / (Czech Republic) Barbora Strýcová, 6–4, 6–4
