= 2017 Australian Open Series =

In tennis, the 2017 Australian Open Series, (sometimes known as the 'Australian Summer of Tennis' which includes a group of hard court tournaments that starts on January 1, 2017 and concludes with the men's singles final at the Australian Open on January 29, 2017.

== Tournament Schedule ==
Legend
Grand Slam Event
Hopman Cup
ATP World Tour 500 and WTA Premier
ATP World Tour 250 and WTA International

Week	Date	Men's Events	Women's Events
1	January 1 – January 8	2017 Hopman Cup; 2017 Champion: France (Richard Gasquet & Kristina Mladenovic)	
1	January 1 – January 8	2017 Brisbane International; 2017 Champion: (Bulgaria) Grigor Dimitrov	2017 Brisbane International; 2017 Champion: (United States) Karolína Plíšková
2	January 9 – January 15	2017 Apia International Sydney; 2017 Champion: (Luxembourg) Gilles Müller	2017 Apia International Sydney; 2017 Champion: (United Kingdom) Jo Konta
2	January 9 – January 15	2017 Apia International Sydney; 2017 Champion: (Luxembourg) Gilles Müller	2017 Hobart International; 2017 Champion: (Belgium) Elise Mertens
3–4	January 16 – January 29	Melbourne; Australian Open; 2017 Champion: (Switzerland) Roger Federer	Melbourne; Australian Open; 2017 Champion: (United States) Serena Williams

== Week 1 ==
=== Hopman Cup ===
==== Final ====
France vs. United States

France
2
Perth Arena, Perth
7 January 2017, 16:00
Hard (i)

United States
1

			1	2	3
1	(France) (United States)	Richard Gasquet; Jack Sock	6; 3	5; 7	7^{8} 6^{6}
2	(France) (United States)	Kristina Mladenovic; Coco Vandeweghe	4; 6	5; 7
3	(France) (United States)	Kristina Mladenovic / Richard Gasquet; Coco Vandeweghe / Jack Sock	4; 1	4^{5} 3^{0}

2017 Hopman Cup Champions
(France)
France
Second title

=== Finals ===
Semifinals
1	(Canada) Milos Raonic	6^{7}	2
7	(Bulgaria) Grigor Dimitrov	7^{9}	6
3	(Japan) Kei Nishikori	7^{7}	6
2	(Switzerland) Stan Wawrinka	6^{3}	3

Final
7	(Bulgaria) Grigor Dimitrov	6	2	6
3	(Japan) Kei Nishikori	2	6	3

=== WTA – Brisbane International ===
Victoria Azarenka was the defending champion, but did not participate due to pregnancy.

=== Finals ===
Semifinals
6	(Ukraine) Elina Svitolina	2	4
3	(Czech Republic) Karolína Plíšková	6	6
4	(Spain) Garbiñe Muguruza	1^{r}
(France) Alizé Cornet	4

Final
3	(Czech Republic) Karolína Plíšková	6	6
(France) Alizé Cornet	0	3

== Week 2 ==
=== ATP – Apia International (Sydney) ===
Viktor Troicki was the two-time defending champion, but lost in the semifinals to Gilles Müller.

Müller went on to win his first ATP title, defeating Daniel Evans in the final, 7–6^{(7–5)}, 6–2.

==== Finals ====
Semifinals
(United Kingdom) Daniel Evans	6	3	6
(Russia) Andrey Kuznetsov	2	6	3
3	(Serbia) Viktor Troicki	3	6^{6}
6	(Luxembourg) Gilles Müller	6	7^{8}

Final
(United Kingdom) Daniel Evans	6^{5}	2
6	(Luxembourg) Gilles Müller	7^{7}	6

=== WTA – Apia International (Sydney) ===
==== Main Draw Finals ====
Semifinals
6	(United Kingdom) Johanna Konta	6	6
WC	(Canada) Eugenie Bouchard	2	2
(Czech Republic) Barbora Strýcová	1	2
2	(Poland) Agnieszka Radwańska	6	6

Final
6	(United Kingdom) Johanna Konta	6	6
2	(Poland) Agnieszka Radwańska	4	2

=== WTA – Hobart International ===
Alizé Cornet was the defending champion, but withdrew before the tournament began due to a back injury.

Elise Mertens won her first WTA singles title, defeating Monica Niculescu in the final, 6–3, 6–1. Mertens had come through the qualifying tournament and thus became only the third qualifier to win the Hobart International, following Mona Barthel in 2012 and Garbiñe Muguruza in 2014.

==== Finals ====
Semifinals
Q	(Belgium) Elise Mertens	6	6
Q	(Croatia) Jana Fett	4	0
3	(Romania) Monica Niculescu	w/o
(Ukraine) Lesia Tsurenko

Final
Q	(Belgium) Elise Mertens	6	6
3	(Romania) Monica Niculescu	3	1

== Week 3-4 ==
=== ATP – Australian Open (Melbourne) ===
Novak Djokovic was the two-time defending champion, but lost in the second round to the 117th ranked Denis Istomin from Uzbekistan.

Roger Federer won his fifth Australian Open title, and 18th Major title overall, defeating Rafael Nadal in the final in five sets. With the win, Federer became the first male player to win at least five titles at three Grand Slam tournaments (five at the Australian Open, seven at Wimbledon and five at the US Open).

This was the first Grand Slam tournament in which Andy Murray started as World No. 1 and top seed. Murray retained the top ranking despite losing to Mischa Zverev in the fourth round.

=== Finals ===
Quarterfinals
(Germany) Mischa Zverev	1	5	2
17	(Switzerland) Roger Federer	6	7	6
4	(Switzerland) Stan Wawrinka	7^{7}	6	6
12	(France) Jo-Wilfried Tsonga	6^{2}	4	3
9	(Spain) Rafael Nadal	6	7^{9}	6
3	(Canada) Milos Raonic	4	6^{7}	4
11	(Belgium) David Goffin	3	2	4
15	(Bulgaria) Grigor Dimitrov	6	6	6

Semifinals
17	(Switzerland) Roger Federer	7	6	1	4	6
4	(Switzerland) Stan Wawrinka	5	3	6	6	3
9	(Spain) Rafael Nadal	6	5	7^{7}	6^{4}	6
15	(Bulgaria) Grigor Dimitrov	3	7	6^{5}	7^{7}	4

Final
17	(Switzerland) Roger Federer (details)	6	3	6	3	6
9	(Spain) Rafael Nadal	4	6	1	6	3

=== WTA – Australian Open (Melbourne) ===
Angelique Kerber was the defending champion, but lost in the fourth round to Coco Vandeweghe.

Serena Williams won the title, her 7th Australian title overall and first Australian Open where she did not lose a set during the tournament. She also regained the No. 1 ranking, defeating her sister Venus Williams in the final, 6–4, 6–4. This marks the first time the Williams sisters met in a Grand Slam final since the 2009 Wimbledon Championships and the first time they met in the Australian Open final since 2003.

Serena's victory was her 23rd Grand Slam title in singles, surpassing Steffi Graf as the all-time leader in Grand Slam titles in the Open era.

=== Finals ===
Quarterfinals
(United States) Coco Vandeweghe	6	6
7	(Spain) Garbiñe Muguruza	4	0
13	(United States) Venus Williams	6	7^{7}
24	(Russia) Anastasia Pavlyuchenkova	4	6^{3}
5	(Czech Republic) Karolína Plíšková	4	6	4
(Croatia) Mirjana Lučić-Baroni	6	3	6
9	(United Kingdom) Johanna Konta	2	3
2	(United States) Serena Williams	6	6

Semifinals
(United States) Coco Vandeweghe	7^{7}	2	3
13	(United States) Venus Williams	6^{3}	6	6
(Croatia) Mirjana Lučić-Baroni	2	1
2	(United States) Serena Williams	6	6

Final
13	(United States) Venus Williams	4	4
2	(United States) Serena Williams	6	6
