= Julien Hoferlin =

Belgian tennis coach

- Born: 5 July 1966; Aywaille, Belgium
- Died: 8 April 2016 (aged 49); Luik, Belgium
- Occupation: Tennis coach
- Known for: Coach of Belgium Davis Cup team (2006–2008)

Julien "Juju" Hoferlin (5 July 1966 – 8 April 2016) was a Belgian tennis coach.

Hoferlin was between 2006 and 2008, coach of the Belgium Davis Cup team. During his career he was the coach of among others Dominique Monami, Olivier Rochus, Christophe Rochus, Steve Darcis and Maryna Zanevska. From 2008 until 2014, Hoferlin was employed by the British Lawn Tennis Association and worked with many players, including coaching Dan Evans, Johanna Konta, Alex Ward and Oliver Golding on an individual basis.

Hoferlin attended the 2012 Davis Cup Europe/Africa Zone Group I tie between Great Britain and Belgium, as Dan Evans' coach. Belgium eventually won 4-1.

After leaving the LTA, Hoferlin returned to Belgium to coach Maryna Zanevska and Steve Darcis and was a consultant to the Royal Belgian Tennis Federation.

Hoferlin died in April 2016 at the age of 49, due to a brain tumor.
