= 2018 Sydney International – Men's doubles =

Men's doubles
- 2018 Sydney International

Final
- Champions: (Poland) Łukasz Kubot (Brazil) Marcelo Melo
- Runners-up: (Germany) Jan-Lennard Struff (Serbia) Viktor Troicki
- Score: 6–3, 6–4

Events
Singles	men	women
Doubles	men	women
- Sydney International

Wesley Koolhof and Matwé Middelkoop were the defending champions, but chose to compete with different partners in Auckland instead.

Łukasz Kubot and Marcelo Melo won the title, defeating Jan-Lennard Struff and Viktor Troicki in the final, 6–3, 6–4.

== Seeds ==
1. (Poland) Łukasz Kubot / (Brazil) Marcelo Melo (champions)
2. (Netherlands) Jean-Julien Rojer / (Romania) Horia Tecău (semifinals)
3. (Spain) Feliciano López / (Spain) Marc López (first round)
4. (India) Rohan Bopanna / (France) Édouard Roger-Vasselin (semifinals)

== Draw ==
Key

- Q = Qualifier
- WC = Wild card
- LL = Lucky loser
- Alt = Alternate
- ITF = ITF entry
- PR = Protected ranking
- SR = Special ranking
- SE = Special exempt
- JE = Junior exempt
- JR = Junior Accelerator Programme entrant
- CO = College Accelerator Programme entrant
- NG = Next Gen Accelerator Program entrant
- w/o = Walkover
- r = Retired
- d = Defaulted

=== Draw ===
First round
1	(Poland) Ł Kubot (Brazil) M Melo	7^{8}	6
(Romania) F Mergea (Serbia) N Zimonjić	6^{6}	3
(Croatia) N Mektić (Austria) A Peya	6	6^{5}	[7]
(Bosnia and Herzegovina) D Džumhur (Czech Republic) R Jebavý	4	7^{7}	[10]
4	(India) R Bopanna (France) É Roger-Vasselin	6	6
(Croatia) I Dodig (Spain) F Verdasco	4	4
WC	(Australia) C O'Connell (Australia) M Reid	6^{10}	6^{5}
(France) F Martin (United States) N Monroe	7^{12}	7^{7}
(Italy) F Fognini (United States) R Ram	3	7	[7]
(Germany) J-L Struff (Serbia) V Troicki	6	5	[10]
WC	(Australia) A Bolt (Australia) J Thompson	6	6
3	(Spain) F López (Spain) M López	1	3
(Colombia) JS Cabal (Colombia) R Farah	6	7^{7}
(Argentina) L Mayer (Argentina) D Schwartzman	3	6^{2}
(Italy) P Lorenzi (Germany) M Zverev	6^{3}	4
2	(Netherlands) J-J Rojer (Romania) H Tecău	7^{7}	6

Quarterfinals
1	(Poland) Ł Kubot (Brazil) M Melo	w/o
(Bosnia and Herzegovina) D Džumhur (Czech Republic) R Jebavý
4	(India) R Bopanna (France) É Roger-Vasselin	7^{7}	7^{7}
(France) F Martin (United States) N Monroe	6^{5}	6^{5}
(Germany) J-L Struff (Serbia) V Troicki	6	7^{10}
WC	(Australia) A Bolt (Australia) J Thompson	4	6^{8}
(Colombia) JS Cabal (Colombia) R Farah	3	6^{4}
2	(Netherlands) J-J Rojer (Romania) H Tecău	6	7^{7}

Semifinals
1	(Poland) Ł Kubot (Brazil) M Melo	6	5	[10]
4	(India) R Bopanna (France) É Roger-Vasselin	4	7	[8]
(Germany) J-L Struff (Serbia) V Troicki	7^{7}	6
2	(Netherlands) J-J Rojer (Romania) H Tecău	6^{5}	1

Final
1	(Poland) Ł Kubot (Brazil) M Melo	6	6
(Germany) J-L Struff (Serbia) V Troicki	3	4
