= Dan Evans (tennis) =

British former tennis player (born 1990)

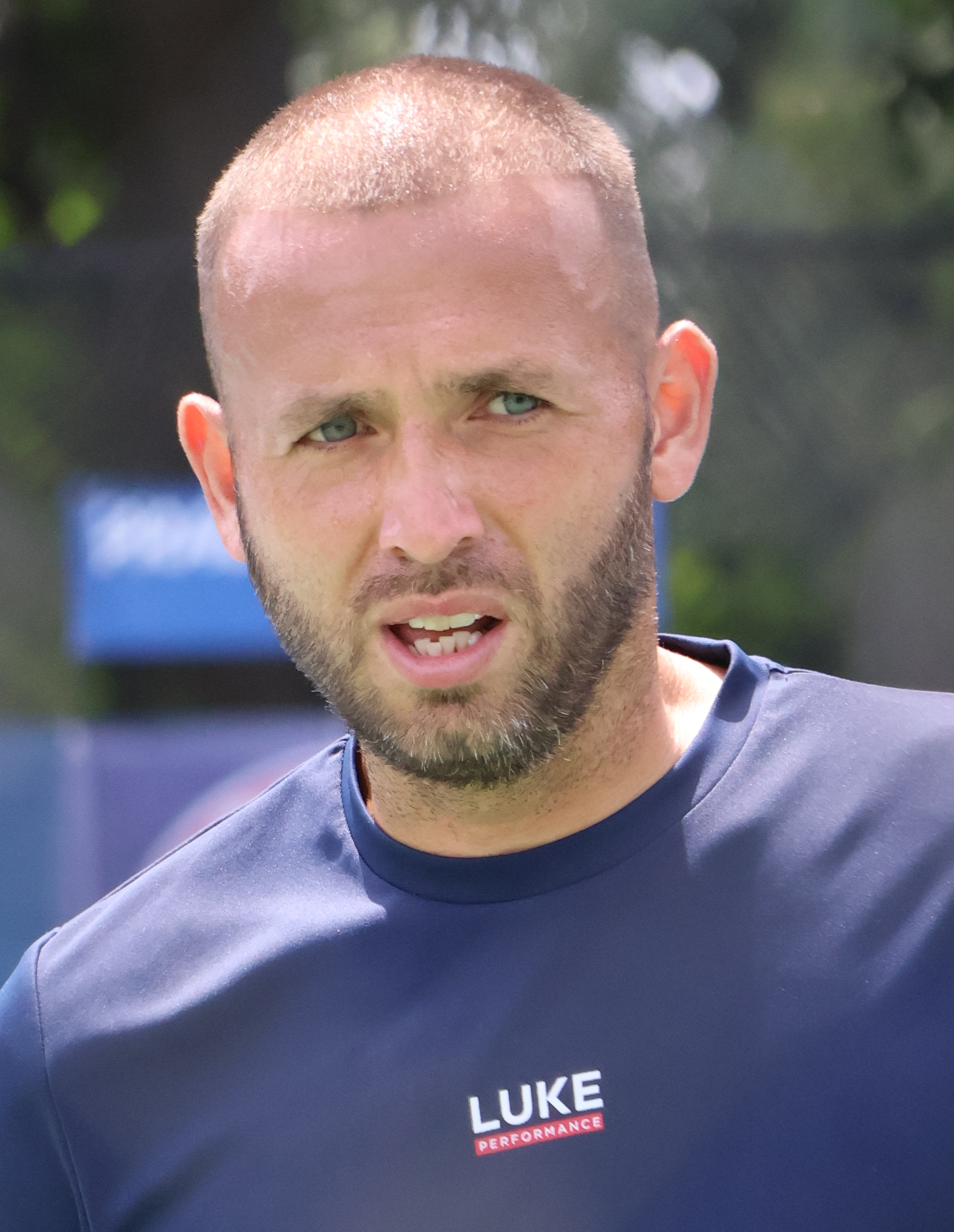
- Evans at the 2023 Washington Open
- Full name: Daniel Evans
- Country (sports): (United Kingdom) Great Britain
- Residence: Dubai, United Arab Emirates
- Born: 23 May 1990 (age 36) Birmingham, England, UK
- Height: 1.75 m (5 ft 9 in)
- Turned pro: 2006
- Retired: 1 July 2026
- Plays: Right-handed (one-handed backhand)
- Coach: Sebastián Prieto (2021-2024)
- Prize money: US $9,406,598

Singles
- Career record: 161–186
- Career titles: 2
- Highest ranking: No. 21 (7 August 2023)

Grand Slam singles results
- Australian Open: 4R (2017)
- French Open: 2R (2022)
- Wimbledon: 3R (2016, 2019, 2021)
- US Open: 4R (2021)

Other tournaments
- Olympic Games: 2R (2024)

Doubles
- Career record: 51–69
- Career titles: 0
- Highest ranking: No. 52 (26 April 2021)

Grand Slam doubles results
- Australian Open: 2R (2021)
- French Open: 2R (2019, 2020)
- Wimbledon: 1R (2014, 2016, 2019, 2024, 2025, 2026)
- US Open: 3R (2016)

Other doubles tournaments
- Olympic Games: QF (2024)

Team competitions
- Davis Cup: W (2015)
- Last updated on: 1 September 2026.

Daniel Evans (born 23 May 1990) is a British former professional tennis player. He was ranked as high as world No. 21 in singles by the Association of Tennis Professionals, achieved in August 2023, and No. 52 in doubles, achieved in April 2021. Evans won two ATP Tour singles titles, at the 2021 Murray River Open (defeating Félix Auger-Aliassime in the final) and at the 2023 Washington Open (defeating Tallon Griekspoor in the final). He was part of the victorious British team at the 2015 Davis Cup.

Evans made his Davis Cup debut for Great Britain against Poland in September 2009. Evans twice won deciding fifth rubbers, against Slovakia and Russia respectively, helping Great Britain progress to the Davis Cup World Group. Evans also played in the semifinal against Australia, losing both of his rubbers, and was a substitute for the Final against Belgium, with Great Britain winning the Davis Cup in 2015, the nation's first success in the tournament for 79 years. The Davis Cup team was awarded the 2015 BBC Sports Personality Team of the Year Award.

== Early and personal life ==
Evans was born and grew up in the Hall Green area of Birmingham; his father is an electrician, his mother a nurse, and he has two older sisters.

At first, Evans played squash with his father, aged seven, at the local squash and tennis club, the West Warwickshire Sports Club in Solihull, only falling into tennis by chance a couple of years later. Once Evans had got to grips with his preferred racket it became quickly apparent that he had some ability and he began training in earnest, moving to Edgbaston Priory aged 10.

By the time he was 13, Evans had moved to Loughborough to live with a host family while training at the Lawn Tennis Association's academy at Loughborough University. Of his time at Loughborough, he said: "I was never the best at 14 and 15, in fact, I was probably the worst. I was smaller than the others and a bit of a late developer, but I always thought I was pretty good and in the end, I was the best."

Evans supports Aston Villa F.C. and has a single figure golf handicap.

== Junior career ==
=== 2004 ===
Evans was a member of the British team that won the World Junior Tennis competition in the Czech Republic aged 14. Evans was guided by LTA Academy coaches Mark Taylor and Leighton Alfred, who both continued working with him sporadically over the years.

=== 2006 ===
In March, Evans won the junior title at Marcq-en-Baroeul, putting him at the top of the European under-16 rankings.

The Lawn Tennis Association withdrew him from the Wimbledon junior tournament for being, in his own words, "stupid on court".

=== 2007 ===
In April, Evans was invited to the Davis Cup tie against the Netherlands, as a hitting partner for Tim Henman and Jamie Murray.

In June, Evans had his first win on the ATP tour in the Nottingham qualifier, losing in the second round.

In July, Evans first victories on the Futures tour, after seven attempts, were at the Great Britain F11 in Felixstowe, where he won two rounds before being beaten in the quarterfinals.

Evans reached the quarterfinals of the US Open boys' singles. Evans won a junior tournament in Paraguay, was a runner-up in the Czech Republic and reached a semi-final in Chile. He also had a successful year in a doubles partnership with David Rice, winning tournaments in Brazil, Uruguay and France. Evans was coached by Mark Hilton at the Nottingham Tennis Centre.

=== 2008 ===
Evans started the year at the Nottinghill junior tournament, by reaching the singles quarterfinals, and the doubles final partnering Dan Cox.

At the Australian Open, Evans reached the quarterfinals of the boys' singles, where he lost to Yuki Bhambri. Again with Dan Cox, they reached the doubles quarterfinals.

He went on to win the fourth junior title of his career in Nottingham.

Junior Slam results – Singles:

Australian Open: QF (2008)
French Open: 1R (2007), 2R (2008)
Wimbledon: 1R (2007), 3R (2008)
US Open: QF (2007)

Junior Slam results – Doubles:

Australian Open: QF (2008)
French Open: 1R (2007), QF (2008)
Wimbledon: 1R (2007), 2R (2008)
US Open: 2R (2007)

== Professional career ==
=== 2008: Futures title, suspension ===
At the start of the year, Evans began working at the National Tennis Centre with Paul Annacone, the LTA men's head coach, who used to work with Pete Sampras and Tim Henman.

In May, Evans reached the quarterfinals of the Bournemouth Futures, achieving a ranking of 1339. A week later, he had another quarterfinal appearance at the Edinburgh Futures, and won the doubles with Joshua Milton at the same event.

In June, he was given a wildcard into the Artois Championships, playing Belgian Xavier Malisse in the first round at Queen's Club. He played in the boys' tournament at Wimbledon, but was suspended until November 2008 by the LTA after he was photographed with Daniel Smethurst at a nightclub in the early hours of the morning. The next day, he partnered Smethurst in the boys' doubles event. In addition to losing his funding, he was also denied wildcards to tournaments and access to practice centres and LTA coaching staff. Instead, Evans trained at the West Warwickshire Club in Solihull.

In August he won his first senior title, a Futures event in Wrexham. Later that month he won in London, with a third senior title coming that October in Glasgow,

He ended the year by winning the LTA Male Junior Player of the Year award and ranked world No. 477.

=== 2009: Davis Cup debut, Challenger title ===
In February, Evans took part in the play-offs for the British Davis Cup team, but lost out to Josh Goodall and Chris Eaton.

Evans won the singles title at The Caversham International in March, an ATP Challenger Tour event, rising to an ATP ranking of world No. 305.

Evans was granted a wildcard into Wimbledon, and was defeated by the 12th seed Nikolay Davydenko. In August, he lost in the first round of qualifying for the US Open to Brazilian Júlio Silva.

In September, Evans, the British No 5, made his debut as part of the Great Britain Davis Cup squad for the Europe/Africa Zone Group I relegation playoff against Poland, along with Andy Murray, Joshua Goodall, James Ward, Ross Hutchins and Ken Skupski. He played in the tie, losing to Jerzy Janowicz in the second rubber, and then losing to Michał Przysiężny in the deciding final rubber. Great Britain were relegated to Europe/Africa Zone Group II for the first time since 1996.

In November, he reached the second round of the Caversham ATP Jersey Open, where he lost to Finland's Jarkko Nieminen.

=== 2010: LTA funding cut ===
Evans began the year by winning his first qualifying tie in Doha, but lost to Steve Darcis in the second qualifying round. A week later, he succeeded in qualifying for an ATP Tour event for the first time, but lost in the first round of the Heineken Open in Auckland to Michael Lammer. This loss allowed him to take part in qualifying for the Australian Open where he won his first qualifying match against Sean Berman. He lost in the second round to Santiago Ventura.

In March, Evans was called to the Davis Cup team in the Europe/Africa Zone Group II tie vs Lithuania, in Vilnius, with James Ward, Ken Skupski and Colin Fleming. The Lithuanian side entered the tie as underdogs; fielding a team of teenagers. Ward won his debut Davis Cup match. Evans lost the second singles match, Fleming and Skupski won their doubles, but Ward and Evans were both beaten on the final day. Evans' defeat was his fourth in two Davis Cup appearances and came against a player ranked 269 places below him at 521 in the world and who had never played a match on the ATP World Tour. This was described as a humiliating Davis Cup defeat for Great Britain, and led to the resignation of Davis Cup Captain John Lloyd. Britain was now threatened with relegation to the lowest tier of the competition.

After failing to qualify for The Championships, Evans moved away from Birmingham to train at the Nottingham Tennis Centre, where he would be coached by Mark Taylor and Leighton Alfred.

In December, the Lawn Tennis Association announced cuts to its financial support for some of Britain's underperforming players from 43 to 30, after raising the standards it requires them to meet. This included Evans, who had been hailed as the country's most promising youngster but had in the past been criticised for a poor attitude.

=== 2011: Back on LTA programme ===
Evans reached the final of three Futures and the semifinal at the Bath Challenger, which led to the All England Club awarding him a wild card for the Championships.

At Wimbledon, Evans lost a close first-round match against the 20th seed Florian Mayer.

Evans' only title this year was the Chiswick Futures F11 doubles with Liam Broady in July.

In December, the Lawn Tennis Association reduced its list of funded players to 23, but Evans was added to the programme, with Julien Hoferlin becoming his coach.

=== 2012: Davis Cup success ===
Evans began the year by competing in a number of UK based ITF Futures tournaments, securing his first singles title of the year in Sheffield in mid-January, where he defeated David Rice in the final. The following month, Evans entered qualifying for the PBZ Zagreb Indoors in Croatia, winning his three qualification matches before ultimately losing in three sets to Guillermo García López in the opening round of the main draw.

In February, Evans was instrumental in Great Britain's 3–2 victory over Slovakia, in the Davis Cup Europe/Africa Zone Group I tie. His ATP record stood at zero wins from 10 matches, while Lukáš Lacko had reached the final ATP event in Zagreb only six days ago. Evans won both of his singles matches, defeating much higher ranked players. Evans dismantled Lukáš Lacko, ranked 211 places above him, and Martin Kližan, ranked 156 places higher, in the deciding rubber. These were Evans' first Davis Cup wins.

Evans was ranked No 291 when he pulled-off two of the most unexpected wins against the Slovak Republic. By April, he was down to world No. 344, having failed to defend his points from last year's Bath Challenger.

Evans also received a qualifying wild card for the Sony Ericsson Open in Miami, but lost in straight sets to Björn Phau.

In April, Evans was selected for Davis Cup Europe/Africa Zone Group I tie against Belgium. After Josh Goodall lost the first rubber, Evans, the world No. 344 pushed Olivier Rochus (#59) to the limit, but Rochus prevailed to take the match. Colin Fleming and Ross Hutchins won their doubles match, but Evans and Goodall lost their second singles matches. Great Britain were beaten 4–1, condemning Leon Smith to his first defeat as Davis Cup Captain.

Soon after the Belgium tie, Evans arrived at the National Tennis Centre, to discover that his LTA coach, Julien Hoferlin had been assigned to Oliver Golding, the former US Open junior champion, instead. Evans was now unable to afford foreign travel, so he spent the next 12 months playing in Britain and Ireland, at ITF Futures level, as well as taking in one Challenger tournament towards the latter stages of the year. He won four ITF Pro Circuit singles titles during the year, all in England. This tally included two titles in as many weeks in September, dropping just one set in ten matches.

Evans was stripped of his funding by the Lawn Tennis Association at the end of the year, having seemingly failed to convince the association of his commitment to the sport.

=== 2013: Nottingham quarterfinal ===
"I know why. It's because I don't train hard enough and don't work hard enough day in and day out. I'm obviously pretty bad at my job. It's up to me, it's not up to anyone else. I want to push on. It's not that I don't want to do it, I obviously want to do it. It's just for whatever reasons, distractions – I need to stay there and just play tennis and that's it. It's easier said than done. Thousands of people have told me to do it but I'm yet to do it for a sustained period of time. When I do do it, I obviously play pretty well. I definitely think I will be top 100, and I still think that."

— Evans, on his own lack of application that has prevented him from progressing further in the sport, in April 2013.

For several months, there was a possibility Evans might quit, as his parents found it difficult to support his career with the necessary £20–25,000-a-year.

After not initially being picked for Great Britain's squad for the Davis Cup tie versus Russia, Evans was given a last-minute place ahead of Britain's No. 3, Jamie Baker. Evans played valiantly in his first rubber against world No. 67 Dmitry Tursunov before losing in five tight sets. With Great Britain trailing 2–0 to Russia, the GB doubles pairing of Colin Fleming and Jonny Marray reduced the deficit a day later, before James Ward levelled the tie at 2–2 after beating Tursunov in five sets. The result meant that Evans had the chance to complete an unlikely comeback when he faced world No. 80 Evgeny Donskoy in the final rubber. Evans defeated Donskoy comprehensively in straight sets, thus securing what was described as a "famous victory". The last time Great Britain had come from 2–0 down to win a Davis Cup tie was 83 years ago against Germany, Consequently, Great Britain won a place in the 16-team World Group play-offs in September.

After discussion with Davis Cup captain Smith, the LTA once again agreed to support Evans with a coach and conditioner. He could also practise at the National Tennis Centre in Roehampton, and was now able to afford to play abroad. In May at his first tournament outside the UK for 12 months, Evans won a clay-court ITF tournament in Båstad, Sweden, where he beat Grzegorz Panfil in the final.

Evans was then given a main-draw wildcard for the 2013 Aegon Trophy in Nottingham in June, reaching the quarterfinal stage of the tournament. In the first round, Evans was dealt a tough draw but overcame fifth seed, and world No. 92, Ryan Harrison in three sets. He then defeated Australian-born Brit Brydan Klein in straight sets in the second round, before losing to the eventual champion, Australian Matthew Ebden in the quarter-finals. Shortly before Evans' victory over Klein, he was informed that he had been handed a main-draw wildcard at the Queen's Club, London, for the 2013 Aegon Championships. He won his first-round match comfortably, beating world No. 75 Guido Pella in straight sets. His fine form continued in the following round when Evans disposed of world No. 37, Finland's Jarkko Nieminen, in three sets. He had been a break down at 2–4 in the final set, taking four consecutive games to record the victory. It was the first time Evans had beaten a player ranked in the top 50. In the third round, Evans went down to Juan Martín del Potro in straight sets.

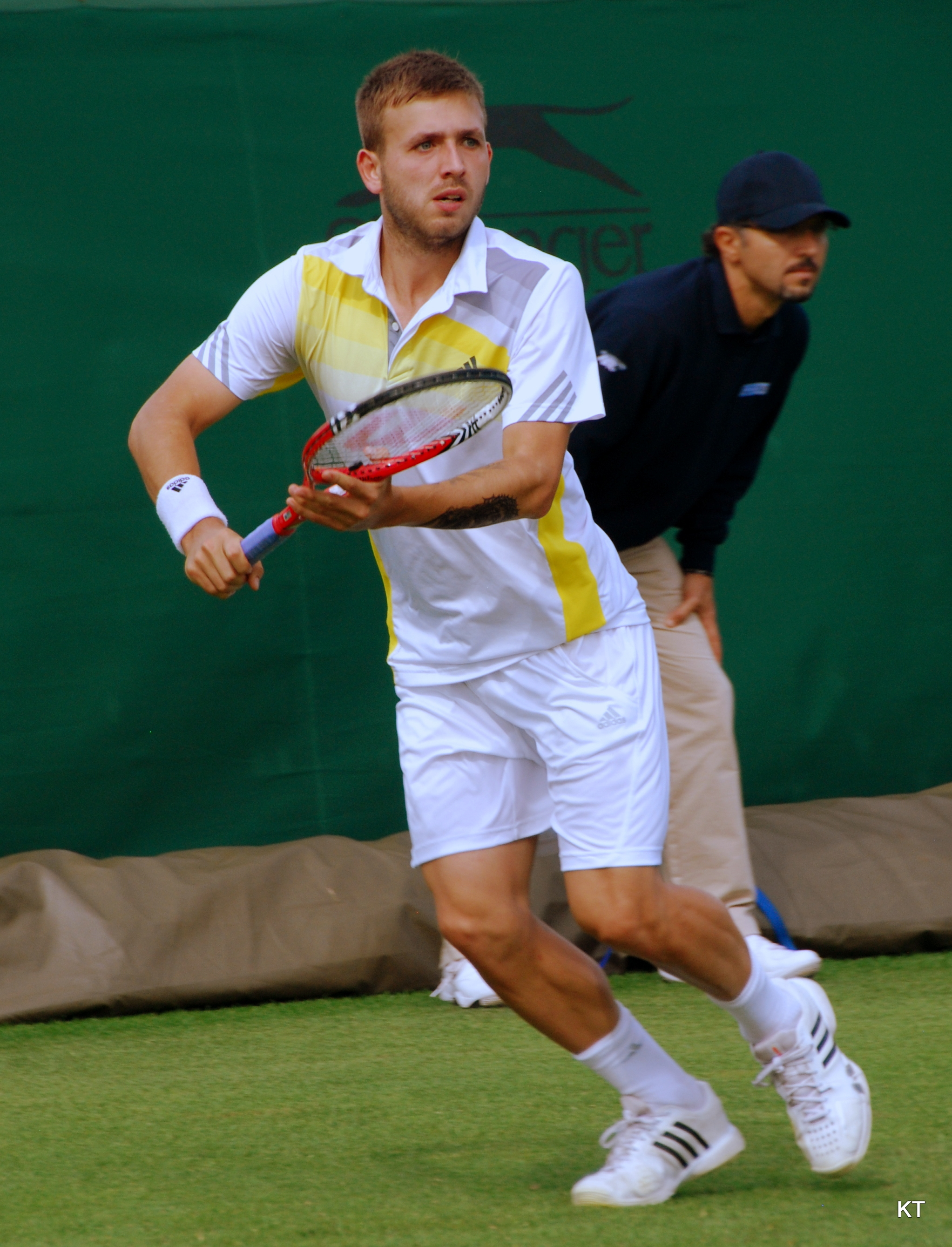
Evans at the 2013 Wimbledon qualifiers

Evans received a wildcard into the Wimbledon qualifiers, where he lost in the first round to Spain's Daniel Muñoz de la Nava.

Evans reached only his second Challenger final in Vancouver, where he picked up some notable scalps along the way. He defeated top seed Evgeny Donskoy, eighth seed Olivier Rochus, and fifth seed Bobby Reynolds to set up a final clash with second seed and home favourite Vasek Pospisil, where he lost in three sets. This performance saw Evans rise to the top 200 for the first time, reaching number 194, and he also gained direct entry to the Comerica Bank Challenger. Evans completed back-to-back Challenger finals, defeating top seed Guido Pella for the second time this year along the way. In the final, he lost to American Bradley Klahn despite holding match point in the second set. This run would see Evans rise to a career-high of no. 169 and become Britain's no. 2.

After coming through three rounds of qualifying Evans qualified for his first slam event in over two years at the US Open and his first outside Wimbledon. On 26 August at the US Open, he achieved his most impressive victory to date, beating 11th seed Kei Nishikori in the first round in straight sets, to become one of only six British players to beat a player inside the ATP top 15 in a slam since 1990. The others were Andy Murray, Tim Henman, Greg Rusedski, Jeremy Bates and Nick Brown. Evans made the third round of a Grand Slam for the first time, beating Bernard Tomic of Australia in the second round in four sets. He ultimately lost to 19th seed Tommy Robredo in the third round; however, this earned him prize money of US$93,000, almost half of his entire career earnings up to that point.

The 23-year-old reached a career-high ranking of 149, becoming British No 2, and consequently, Evans was picked as Britain's second singles player in the Davis Cup World Group play-off against Croatia in Umag on clay. Evans lost his Friday's singles match against Croatia's No 1 Ivan Dodig, ranked 35, but Andy Murray, playing in his first Davis Cup tie for two years, won both his singles matches and the doubles with Colin Fleming. Evans won the dead rubber to help beat Croatia 4–1, and return Great Britain to the World Group for the first time since 2008.

=== 2014: Knee injury ===
Evans began the year at the 2014 Qatar Open where he came through Qualifying before losing to Ernests Gulbis in the first round. In Melbourne, Evans entered the qualifying competition of the 2014 Australian Open as the 26th seed, however, lost in the second round of qualifying to Hungarian Márton Fucsovics.

In February he entered the qualifying stages of the PBZ Zagreb Indoors as the third seed, losing in the final round of qualification to Björn Phau, however he received entry to the main draw as a lucky loser after the withdrawal of 7th seed Radek Štěpánek. Evans beat Jan Hájek and Michael Berrer in the first two rounds to make his first-ever quarterfinal at ATP World Tour level. He then stunned third seed Philipp Kohlschreiber in three sets, overcoming a ranking deficit of 120 places. In the semifinal, he lost to Tommy Haas in three tight sets. Despite this loss, he rose to a new career-high ranking of 123.

After losing in the first round of Wimbledon, his coach, Julien Hoferlin departed for his home country of Belgium, and told journalists "He [Evans] has the potential to make himself a top-60 player, but he makes no sacrifices for his sport. He doesn't understand that tennis has to be his priority. For him, it's just a brief interlude in his life."

Evans had a bad knee injury at Wimbledon and missed the last three months of the year.

=== 2015: Davis Cup champion ===
At the start of this year, Evans played three events, but in March he was fined £350 for failing to turn up for the F4 Futures event on the Wirral, sparking fears about his commitment. He then disappeared for three months, struggling with a knee injury that sent his ranking to an all-time low of 772 in May.

In June, Evans lost in qualifying for three straight Challengers in Manchester, Surbiton and Ilkley, all on grass. At Wimbledon, Evans lost his final qualifying match against Japan's Yūichi Sugita. However, since May, Evans returned to some kind of form, reeling off 29 wins from 33 matches, with four Futures titles, Egypt, Frinton, Felixstowe & Nottingham, Roehampton finalist and a run to the semis of a Challenger in Vancouver, where he beat Czech Radek Štěpánek along the way.

His ranking recovered to exactly No. 300, and the fact that Evans beat Australian Bernard Tomic in the 2013 US Open, led to his surprise recall to the Great Britain squad for the Davis Cup Semi-final against Australia. Evans was not even among four contenders that GB team captain Leon Smith named for two singles berths just over a week previously, but was now picked ahead of the injured Kyle Edmund, who is 200 places above him in the rankings at 100, and the woefully out-of-form James Ward. Though Evans lost both his singles matches, Great Britain won 3–2 and reached the Davis Cup Final for the first time since 1978.

On 15 November, Dan Evans, ranked 271, won the Knoxville Challenger on a hard court. On the same day, Kyle Edmund won the Copa Fila Challenge title in Argentina on clay beating Argentina's Carlos Berlocq, ranked No 112 in the world and an expert on the red stuff. James Ward lost in the second round of the same event, though Ward, ranked 156, had also recently won a hard court challenger tournament.

With Belgium opting to stage the Davis Cup Final on an indoor clay court, Leon Smith chose to go with the British number two Edmund, now ranked 100. Evans and Dominic Inglot accompanied the nominated British team of Andy Murray, Kyle Edmund, Jamie Murray, James Ward, as hitting partners. Great Britain went on to win the Davis Cup for the first time since 1936. Evans and Dominic Inglot joined the team on the winner's podium, and they all received the same Davis Cup medals.

Evans joined the rest of the Davis Cup team at the BBC Sports Personality of the Year Show, where they won the 2015 Team of the Year Award.

=== 2016: Top 60 debut ===
In January Evans entered the qualifying for the Australian Open. He advanced to the main draw of the tournament for the first time in his career where he lost comfortably to 18th seed Feliciano López, winning only five games in three sets.

At the RBC Tennis Championships of Dallas in February, Evans was beaten by Kyle Edmund in the first all-British Challenger final since 2005, when Alex Bogdanovic beat Mark Hilton.

Six weeks later, there was a second all-British final, at the Challenger Banque Nationale de Drummondville in Canada, where world No. 157 & British No 4, Evans defeated world No. 531 & British No. 17, Edward Corrie, in two sets to claim his third ATP Challenger title. Evans rose to No. 125, two places short of his highest ever ranking.

Evans also reached the final of the Drummondville Doubles playing with Lloyd Glasspool. Evans played eight doubles events this year, four with Lloyd Glasspool.

Evans, Kyle Edmund, Dominic Inglot, Andy Murray and Jamie Murray were named for the Davis Cup World Group 1st round match against Japan. On the Wednesday before the tie, Edmund picked up a back injury during practice, so Dan Evans was chosen as the second singles player. Though Evans had beaten Kei Nishikori at the 2013 US Open, he lost his Davis Cup rubber against Kei Nishikori, but Great Britain won 3–1 and progressed to the quarter-finals.

Evans missed the entire clay-court season for the second year running. In April Evans played in the Santaizi ATP Challenger in Taiwan where he advanced to the final without dropping a set. In the final, he beat Russian Konstantin Kravchuk in three sets. This marked a major career milestone for Evans who by winning the title, broke the top 100 of the ATP rankings for the first time, and Great Britain now had four players inside the top 100 for the first time since 1979. A week later, Evans reached the final of the Busan Open Challenger in South Korea, but afterwards Evans had a poor grass-court season in the lead up to Wimbledon.

Evans' ranking allowed him to enter Wimbledon without the need for a wild card. In the first round, he faced Jan-Lennard Struff, and won in four sets, despite suffering an injury in the fourth set. He defeated 30th seed Alexandr Dolgopolov in the second round in straight sets, enabling passage to a third-round match against 3rd seed and seven-time champion Roger Federer on Centre Court. However he lost in straight sets, this was only the second time Evans had reached the third round of a grand slam and his first third-round match at a grand slam since 2013.

John Lloyd chose Evans to play World TeamTennis for the San Diego Aviators in August, but he pulled out with no explanation. Evans was named for the Davis Cup quarter-final tie against Serbia on clay, but withdrew, citing a shoulder injury after switching to clay, and "a couple of issues at home". Evans was offered a place in the Rio Olympics due to several withdrawals, but instead he continued on the Tour to improve his ranking.

A day after the Davis Cup Serbia tie, Evans was in Washington for the Citi Open where he beat world No. 40 Grigor Dimitrov to reach the last 16. Although he eventually lost in the 3rd round against American big server Jack Sock. Following an impressive run in Washington, Evans won a 3rd challenger title of the year on 14 August in an all British final against Cameron Norrie.

At the US Open, he defeated 27th seed Alexander Zverev in 4 sets in the second round. The teenage Zverev was regarded as a future world No. 1, and Evans thought this was the best result of his career, being his third victory against a top-30 opponent. Evans equalled his previous best tournament performance by reaching the third round, and pushing 3rd seed and eventual champion Stan Wawrinka to 5 sets, eventually losing after setting up a match point in the 4th set tiebreak. Including Andy Murray and Kyle Edmund, Great Britain had three men in the last 32 for the first time since 1968. He rose to a career-high ranking of world No. 53.

In the US Open Doubles, Evans teamed up with Nick Kyrgios, winning two rounds, but they withdrew from the next match with both players citing injury from their singles matches.

Initially, Evans, Andy Murray, Kyle Edmund, Jamie Murray and Dominic Inglot were called upon for the Davis Cup semi-final against Argentina. Eventually, Inglot was dropped to give the team more singles options, though Evans was a possible doubles partner for Jamie Murray because he had played seven doubles events so far this year. With the tie poised at 2–2, Evans played the deciding rubber against Leonardo Mayer, winning the first set but finally losing in four sets.

=== 2017: Australian Open fourth round, Top 50, failed drug test, ban ===
January saw Evans beat 8th ranked Dominic Thiem at Sydney Apia International before winning the semi-final to meet Gilles Müller in Evans' first ATP Tour final. He was the first English born player to reach a singles final there in more than 11 years (Tim Henman being the last in 2006) but lost the match in straight sets.

The following week, Evans beat seventh-seed Marin Čilić in the second round of the Australian Open. Evans progressed to the fourth round with a straight sets win over Bernard Tomic, setting up a round-of-16 tie with Jo-Wilfried Tsonga (seeded 12th). While he lost the match in 4 sets, this was the furthest he had progressed in any Grand Slam event to date.

Playing in the 2017 Davis Cup World Group first round against the Canada Davis Cup team, Evans beat Denis Shapovalov before losing to Vasek Pospisil, the Great Britain Davis Cup team progressing to the quarter-finals.

Evans was banned from playing professional tennis due to testing positive for cocaine in April 2017. Evans claims that he took a relatively small amount of cocaine out of competition, but that some permitted medication he was taking was then 'contaminated' by the cocaine because he accidentally put the leftover cocaine in the pocket of his washbag, thus testing positive in-competition. Evans was eligible to return to the professional circuit on 24 April 2018, having completed a one-year ban.

=== 2018: Return from suspension ===
Evans returned from his drugs ban on 28 April 2018, having only started training again two months earlier, defeating compatriot Edward Corrie in the first round of qualifying in an ATP Challenger Tour event in Glasgow. He subsequently defeated Sam Barry to qualify for the main draw of the tournament, but lost in the first round to Lucas Miedler.

Evans was not awarded a wildcard for the 2018 Wimbledon Championships. However, following victories in two pre-qualifying matches, Evans secured a wildcard entry to the main qualifying event.

=== 2019–2020: British No. 1, top 30 and Delray Beach final ===
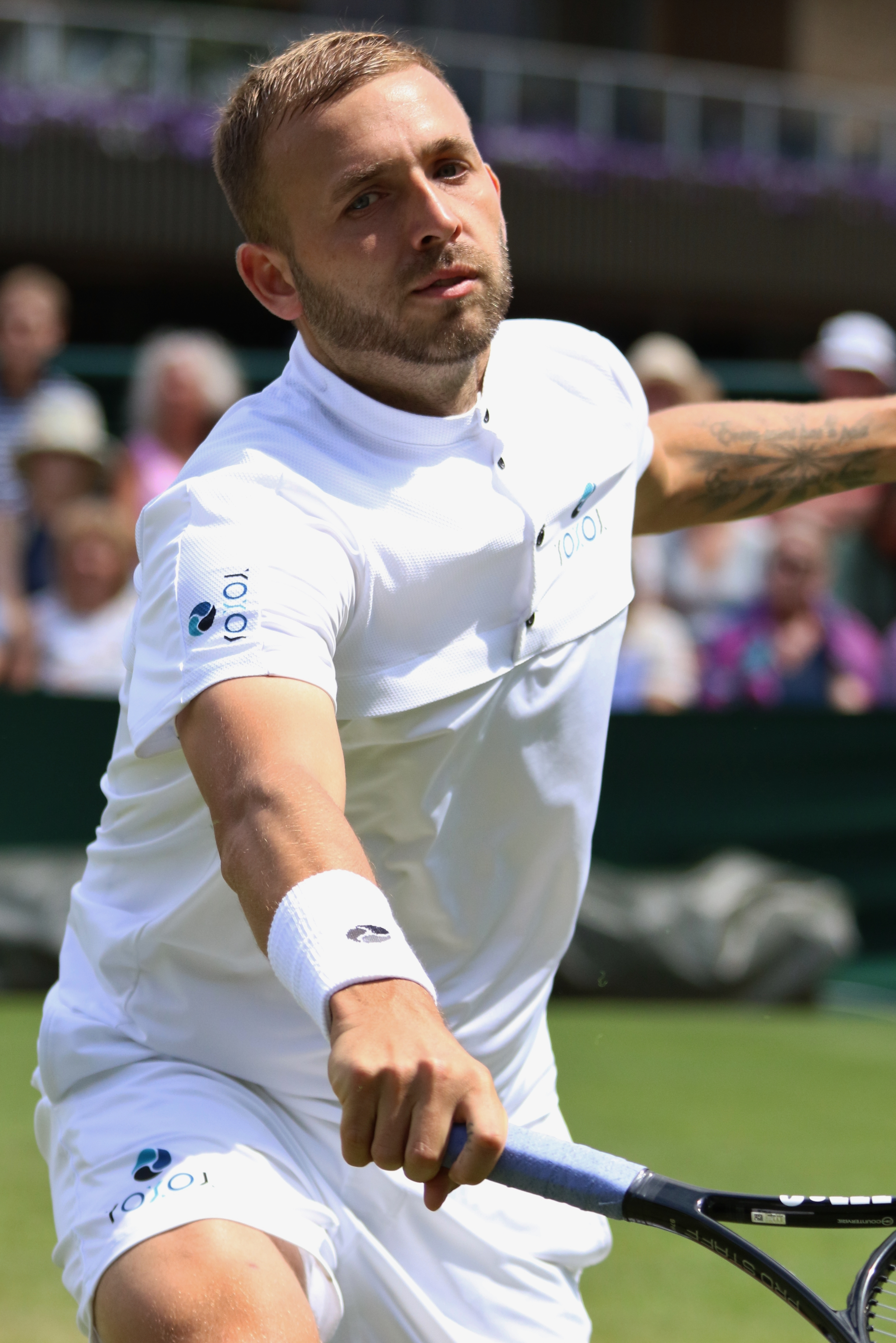
Evans at the 2019 Wimbledon Championships

Evans reached the final of the 2019 Delray Beach Open, but lost to Radu Albot in a third-set tiebreaker. On 14 October 2019 he became Britain's number 1.

He started the 2020 season by competing in the inaugural ATP Cup, and reached a new career-high of No. 33 on 13 January. Evans defeated seventh seed Andrey Rublev in the quarterfinals at the 2020 Dubai Tennis Championships, but lost in the last four to Stefanos Tsitsipas in straight sets. As a result of his performance at the tournament, his ranking rose to No. 28 in the world.

Evans also reached the semifinals in Antwerp and Vienna, where he lost to Ugo Humbert and Lorenzo Sonego, respectively.

He finished the year ranked No. 33 in the world.

=== 2021: First ATP singles title & Masters semifinal, top 25 ===
In February, Evans earned his first ATP Tour title at the Murray River Open in Melbourne. As a result, he reached a new career-high ranking of world No. 26 on 8 February in singles. At the 2021 Australian Open, he lost in the first round to compatriot Cameron Norrie.

At the beginning of April, Evans reached his first Masters 1000 final with compatriot Neal Skupski at the Miami Open, losing to Mate Pavić and Nikola Mektić.

At the Monte-Carlo Masters, Evans recorded his first ever victory over a world number 1 after he beat Novak Djokovic in straight sets. The victory also meant Evans reached his first Masters 1000 quarterfinal. He defeated David Goffin in the quarterfinals as well to reach his first Masters 1000 singles semifinal, where he lost to eventual champion Stefanos Tsitsipas. In the same tournament, partnering again with Neal Skupski, he reached his second Masters 1000 doubles final within two weeks, losing again to 2nd seeds Mate Pavić and Nikola Mektić. As a result, he reached a career-high of world No. 56 in doubles on 19 April.

Evans next played at the Madrid Open, where he defeated Jérémy Chardy and John Millman to reach the last 16. He lost to fifth seed Alexander Zverev in straight sets.

Evans reached the quarterfinals at the Nottingham Open, beating Thanasi Kokkinakis and Matthew Ebden before losing to sixth seed Denis Kudla. He made his top 25 debut on 14 June. The following week, he also reached the quarterfinals as the sixth seed at Queens, losing to eventual champion Matteo Berrettini in straight sets.

Seeded 22nd, Evans reached the third round of the Wimbledon. After scoring straight-set wins against Feliciano López and Dušan Lajović. In the third round, Evans lost to Sebastian Korda in four sets.

Evans was set to play at the delayed Tokyo Olympics, representing Great Britain, playing in the men's singles event and partnering with Neal Skupski in the men's doubles. However, shortly before the start of the Olympics, Evans tested positive for COVID-19, forcing him to self-isolate and withdraw from the event.

At the US Open, he reached his second Major fourth round by defeating Alexei Popyrin in a fifth-set tiebreak after returning from two sets down. He then lost to world No. 2 Daniil Medvedev. As a result of his US Open run, Evans rose to a career high ranking of No. 23 on 13 September.

=== 2022: Second Masters semifinal ===
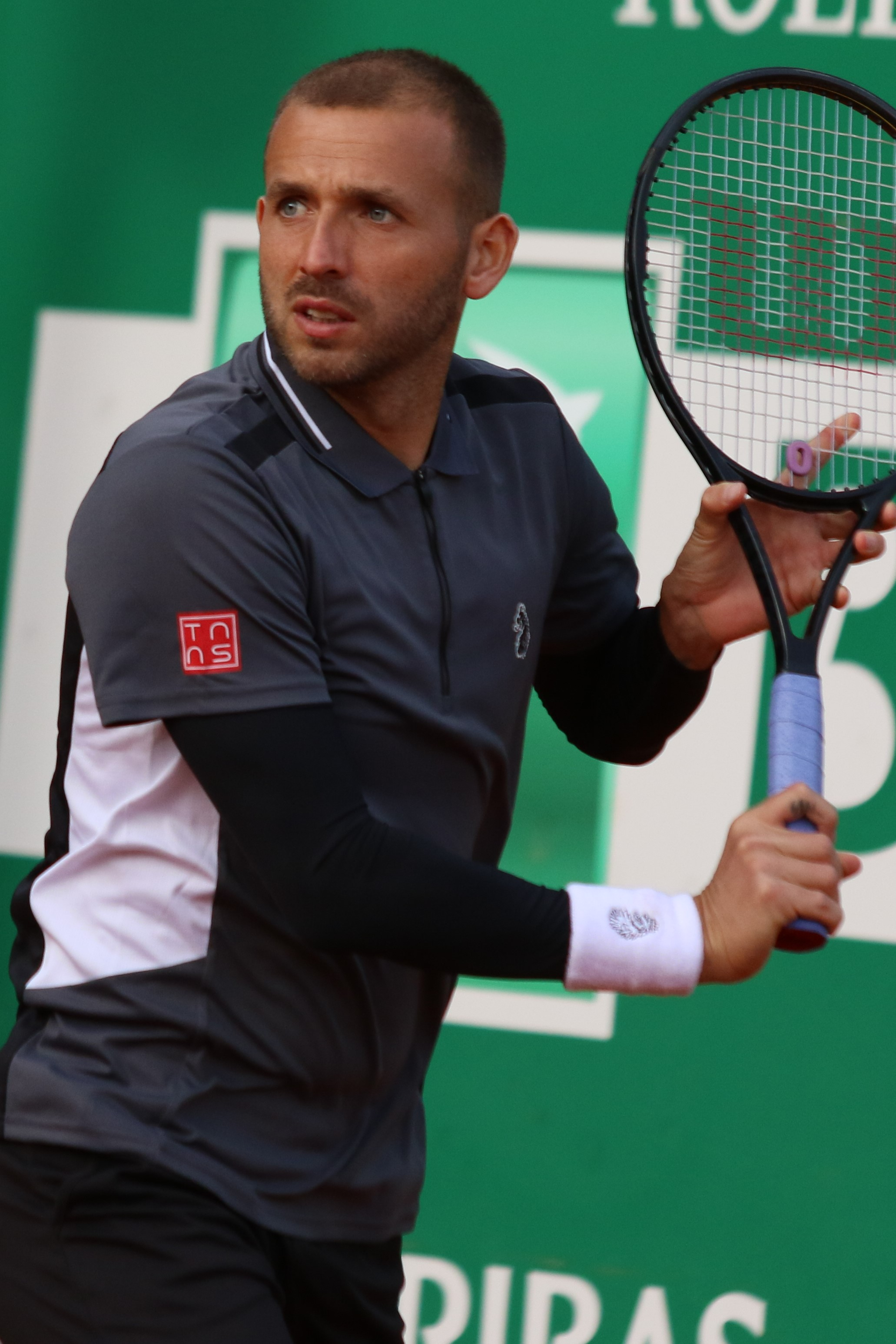
Evans at the 2022 Monte-Carlo Masters

Evans started his season playing for Great Britain at the ATP Cup. He won all of his matches in the group stage, with singles wins against Germany's Jan-Lennard Struff, Canada's Denis Shapovalov, and the United States' John Isner. He also won his two doubles matches where he paired with Jamie Murray to win against Germans Kevin Krawietz and Alexander Zverev, as well as Americans John Isner and Taylor Fritz. Evans went on to reach the semifinals of the 2022 Sydney International, where he was seeded third. He beat Pedro Martínez and Maxime Cressy, before losing to top seed Aslan Karatsev.

Seeded 24th, Evans entered into the Australian Open and beat David Goffin in straight sets in the first round. He advanced to the third round following a withdrawal from Arthur Rinderknech due to injury, where he was defeated by 9th seed Félix Auger-Aliassime.

In June, Evans won his second Nottingham Open title, defeating Jordan Thompson in straight sets in the final.

Seeded 16th at the Citi Open, he reached the quarterfinals with a win over Taylor Fritz by retirement, before losing to Yoshihito Nishioka. At the Canadian Open he repeated the same feat defeating 10th seeded Fritz to reach again the quarterfinals, only for a second time at a Masters 1000, having defeated fifth seed and world No. 8 Andrey Rublev in the previous round in straight sets. He went one step further to reach his second semifinal at the Masters 1000 level defeating American Tommy Paul. In the semifinals, he lost to eventual winner Pablo Carreño Busta in three sets. At the same tournament, partnering with John Peers, Evans also reached the doubles final but lost to Wesley Koolhof and Neal Skupski in a deciding champions tiebreak.

Seeded 20th at the US Open, Evans defeated Jiří Veselý and James Duckworth, before losing in the third round to Marin Čilić in a four set match lasting four hours.

As top seed, he reached the semifinals at the San Diego Open, defeating Taro Daniel and Constant Lestienne. Evans lost in the last four to third seed Marcos Giron.

At the end of the season, he made back-to-back quarterfinals at the European Open and Vienna Open, losing to Canadians Félix Auger-Aliassime and Denis Shapovalov respectively.

=== 2023: Two Major third rounds, First ATP 500 title, career high ranking ===
Evans again made it to the third round of the Australian Open with wins over Facundo Bagnis and Jérémy Chardy, before he was defeated by Andrey Rublev.

Seeded second at the Grand Prix Hassan II he reached the semifinals where he lost to eventual champion Roberto Carballés Baena. At the Barcelona Open Evans reached another semifinal defeating sixth seed Karen Khachanov and 15th seed Francisco Cerúndolo en route, before losing to top seed and eventual champion Carlos Alcaraz. In Madrid he lost in the second round to Bernabé Zapata Miralles and in Rome he also lost in the second round to another Spaniard, Roberto Carballés Baena, for a second time in the season, in a match lasting almost four hours.

Evans' season got back on track in August when he defeated Grégoire Barrère, Alexander Shevchenko, Frances Tiafoe, Grigor Dimitrov and Dutchman Tallon Griekspoor to win the ATP Tour 500 Citi Open in Washington DC. As a result Evans reached his highest ATP Tour ranking of world No. 21 on 7 August 2023.

Seeded 26th at the US Open he defeated Daniel Elahi Galán in the first round in straight sets and Botic van de Zandschulp in the second round for the loss of one set. In the third round he lost to World No. 1 and top seed Carlos Alcaraz who was pushed hard in defeating Evans in four sets.

=== 2024: Olympic quarterfinal with Murray, record-breaking US Open match time ===
Evans partnered with Andy Murray in the men's doubles at the Paris Olympics, reaching the quarterfinals where they lost to Taylor Fritz and Tommy Paul in what was Murray's last match as a professional tennis player.

At the US Open, Evans defeated 23rd seed Karen Khachanov in the first round in the longest match in the tournament's history, lasting five hours and 35 minutes, surpassing the previous record of five hours and 26 minutes from the 1992 semifinal between Stefan Edberg and Michael Chang. He followed his marathon effort up by reaching the third round for a fourth year in a row, with a straight sets win over Mariano Navone. Evans lost to 10th seed Alex de Minaur in the third round.

=== 2025: Eastbourne quarterfinal ===
Having dropped to world No. 199, Evans was given a wildcard into the Queen's Club Championships in June, and defeated seventh seed Frances Tiafoe to reach the second round, where he lost to Brandon Nakashima. The following week at the Eastbourne Open, he again entered the main-draw as a wildcard and overcame world No. 49 Miomir Kecmanović and second seed Tommy Paul to make it into the quarterfinals. His run was ended in the last eight by lucky loser Jenson Brooksby in straight sets. At Wimbledon, Evans defeated fellow British wildcard entrant Jay Clarke in the first round, but lost to sixth seed Novak Djokovic in his next match.

Entering as a wildcard at the Washington Open, Evans registered wins over Zizou Bergs and 13th seed Alex Michelsen to reach the third round, where he lost to lucky loser Corentin Moutet.

=== 2026: Sporadic appearances, retirement ===
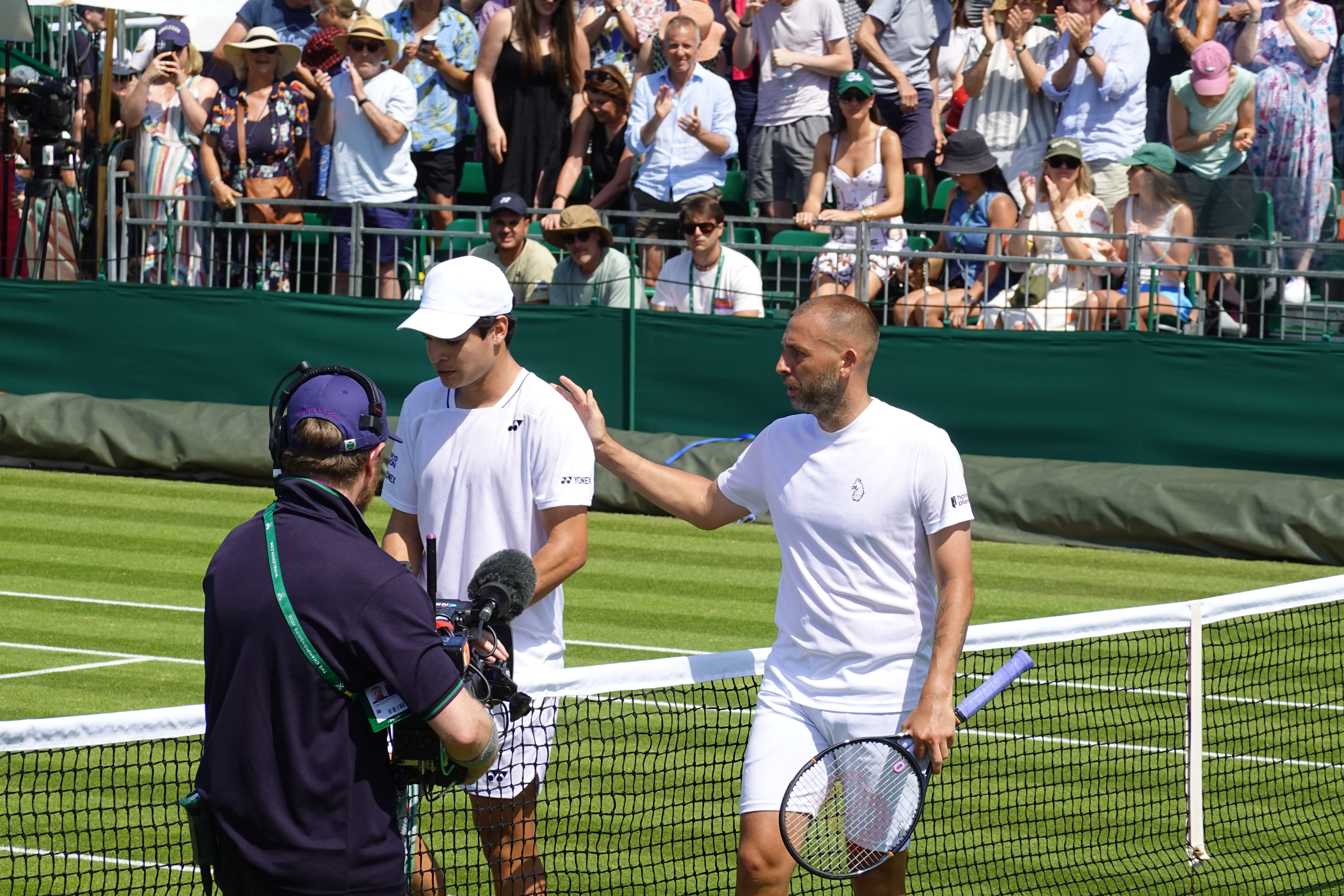
Dan Evans (right) defeated Juan Carlos Prado Ángelo (left) in his penultimate professional singles tennis match during the 2026 Wimbledon qualifying tournament. This match was his final singles victory before retirement from professional tennis.

Having played no warm-up events, Evans lost to Rei Sakamoto in the first round of qualifying at the Australian Open. His next tournament was the qualifying competition at the French Open in May, where he was again eliminated in the first round, losing to 17 year old wildcard entrant Daniel Jade. On 11 June, Evans announced he would retire from professional tennis after Wimbledon. He missed out on a singles wildcard and instead entered qualifying, where he defeated Juan Carlos Prado Ángelo, before losing to Tristan Schoolkate in the second round. Evans was awarded a wildcard entry into the men's doubles partnering Henry Searle. They lost to ninth seeds Hugo Nys and Édouard Roger-Vasselin in the first round.

== Playing style ==
Evans was an all-court player who played a tactical game with an emphasis on counter-punching and neutralising or re-directing pace. Evans's groundstrokes were solid but not overwhelming weapons, especially his single-handed backhand, which he tended to slice. His game usually involved counter-punching and moving opponents around from the baseline, before finding an opportunity to inject pace and attack. He was known to be a tactical, adaptable player, able to use his variety to probe for weaknesses and disrupt opponents' rhythm. He often used the backhand slice to neutralise the pace in rallies, and also the drop shot to bring opponents to the net, exploiting opponents too comfortable at the baseline. Additionally, Evans was a skilled volleyer and was capable of serve-and-volleying. His lack of consistent power from the baseline was cited as a weakness, though he made up for it with speed and defensive skills.

== Image ==
Evans has been referred to as 'the bad boy of British tennis' and 'the most egregious wasted talent in British tennis'. Evans has lost his LTA funding twice, because of his off-court behaviour and lack of commitment. Firstly as an 18-year-old, he went clubbing in the early hours, the night before a doubles match with Dan Smethurst at the 2008 Junior Wimbledon, which they subsequently lost. Evans was considered to have significant potential but his LTA coaches found his commitment frustratingly inconsistent over the years, so in 2012, Evans was stripped of his funding a second time.

In 2014, the management company Lagardere Unlimited's sports agent, Stuart Duguid, said of his charge Evans: 'British tennis fans are desperate for another top player to get behind in addition to Murray. Dan offers something a little bit different – he's more edgy and unpredictable. He's a bit of an enigma.'

== Performance timelines ==
Key
W	F	SF	QF	#R	RR	Q#	P#	DNQ	A	Z#	PO	G	S	B	NMS	NTI	P	NH

(W) winner; (F) finalist; (SF) semifinalist; (QF) quarterfinalist; (#R) rounds 4, 3, 2, 1; (RR) round-robin stage; (Q#) qualification round; (P#) preliminary round; (DNQ) did not qualify; (A) absent; (Z#) Davis/Fed Cup Zonal Group (with number indication) or (PO) play-off; (G) gold, (S) silver or (B) bronze Olympic/Paralympic medal; (NMS) not a Masters tournament; (NTI) not a Tier I tournament; (P) postponed; (NH) not held; (SR) strike rate (events won / competed); (W–L) win–loss record.
To avoid confusion and double counting, these charts are updated at the conclusion of a tournament or when the player's participation has ended.

=== Singles ===
Tournament	2008	2009	2010	2011	2012	2013	2014	2015	2016	2017	2018	2019	2020	2021	2022	2023	2024	2025	2026	SR	W–L	Win %
Grand Slam tournaments
Australian Open	A	A	Q2	A	A	A	Q2	A	1R	4R	A	2R	2R	1R	3R	3R	1R	Q1	Q1	0 / 8	8–8	50%
French Open	A	A	A	A	A	A	Q1	A	A	1R	A	1R	1R	1R	2R	1R	1R	Q2	Q1	0 / 7	1–7	13%
Wimbledon	A	1R	Q2	1R	A	Q1	1R	Q3	3R	A	Q2	3R	NH	3R	1R	1R	1R	2R	Q2	0 / 10	7–10	41%
US Open	A	Q1	A	A	A	3R	Q1	A	3R	A	A	3R	2R	4R	3R	3R	3R	Q1	A	0 / 8	16–8	67%
Win–loss	0–0	0–1	0–0	0–1	0–0	2–1	0–1	0–0	4–3	3–2	0–0	5–4	2–3	5–4	4–4	4–4	2–4	1–1	0–0	0 / 33	32–33	49%
National representation
Summer Olympics	A	NH			A	NH			A	NH				A	NH		2R	NH		0 / 1	1–1	50%
Davis Cup	A	Z1	Z2	A	Z1	PO	A	W	SF	QF	PO	SF	NH	QF	RR	QF	RR	A	A	1 / 8	14–22	39%
ATP Masters 1000
Indian Wells Open	A	A	A	A	A	A	A	A	A	2R	A	1R	NH	3R	3R	2R	1R	A	A	0 / 6	3–6	33%
Miami Open	A	A	A	A	Q1	A	Q2	A	A	1R	A	2R	NH	2R	2R	2R	2R	A	A	0 / 6	2–6	25%
Monte-Carlo Masters	A	A	A	A	A	A	A	A	A	1R	A	A	NH	SF	2R	1R	1R	A	A	0 / 5	5–5	50%
Madrid Open	A	A	A	A	A	A	A	A	A	1R	A	A	NH	3R	3R	2R	A	A	A	0 / 4	4–4	50%
Italian Open	A	A	A	A	A	A	A	A	A	1R	A	1R	1R	1R	1R	2R	1R	A	A	0 / 7	0–7	0%
Canadian Open	A	A	A	A	A	A	A	A	A	A	A	2R	NH	1R	SF	1R	A	A	A	0 / 4	5–4	56%
Cincinnati Open	A	A	A	A	A	A	A	A	A	A	A	Q1	2R	1R	1R	1R	A	A	A	0 / 4	1–4	20%
Shanghai Masters	NH	A	A	A	A	A	A	A	A	A	A	Q2	NH			3R	1R	A	A	0 / 2	1–2	33%
Paris Masters	A	A	A	A	A	A	A	A	A	A	A	A	1R	1R	2R	A	A	A	A	0 / 3	1–3	25%
Win–loss	0–0	0–0	0–0	0–0	0–0	0–0	0–0	0–0	0–0	1–5	0–0	2–4	1–3	7–8	9–8	1–8	1–5	0–0	0–0	0 / 41	22–41	35%
Career statistics
	2008	2009	2010	2011	2012	2013	2014	2015	2016	2017	2018	2019	2020	2021	2022	2023	2024	2025	2026	Career		
Tournaments	1	1	1	2	1	2	6	0	8	10	1	18	13	23	26	24	20	6	0	Career total: 163		
Titles	0	0	0	0	0	0	0	0	0	0	0	0	0	1	0	1	0	0	0	Career total: 2		
Finals	0	0	0	0	0	0	0	0	0	1	0	1	0	1	0	1	0	0	0	Career total: 4		
Hard Win–loss	0–0	0–2	0–3	0–0	2–3	3–2	3–3	0–2	5–7	10–6	1–0	15–16	19–11	15–15	25–17	13–17	7–13	2–2	0–0	2 / 99	120–119	50%
Clay Win–loss	0–0	0–0	0–0	0–0	0–0	1–1	0–0	0–0	0–0	3–6	0–0	0–2	0–3	6–6	4–7	5–7	1–7	0–0	0–0	0 / 36	20–39	34%
Grass Win–loss	0–1	0–1	0–0	0–2	0–0	2–1	1–3	0–0	4–3	0–0	0–1	4–3	0–0	4–2	1–3	0–2	0–2	5–4	0–0	0 / 28	21–28	43%
Overall win–loss	0–1	0–3	0–3	0–2	2–3	6–4	4–6	0–2	9–10	13–12	1–1	19–21	19–14	25–23	30–27	18–26	8–22	7–6	0–0	2 / 163	161–186	46%
Win %	0%	0%	0%	0%	40%	60%	40%	0%	47%	52%	50%	48%	58%	52%	53%	41%	27%	54%	–	Career total: 46%		
Year-end ranking	477	261	363	342	297	150	305	183	66	133	192	42	32	25	27	38	164	185				

=== Doubles ===
Tournament	2013	2014	2015	2016	2017	2018	2019	2020	2021	2022	2023	2024	2025	2026	SR	W–L
Grand Slam tournaments
Australian Open	A	A	A	A	A	A	A	1R	2R	A	A	A	A	A	0 / 2	1–2
French Open	A	A	A	A	A	A	2R	2R	A	A	A	1R	A	A	0 / 3	2–3
Wimbledon	Q1	1R	A	1R	A	A	1R	NH	A	A	A	1R	1R	1R	0 / 6	0–6
US Open	A	A	A	3R	A	A	2R	A	1R	A	A	A	A	A	0 / 3	3–2
Win–loss	0–0	0–1	0–0	2–1	0–0	0–0	2–3	1–2	1–2	0–0	0–0	0–2	0–1	0–1	0 / 14	6–13
National representation
Summer Olympics	NH			A	NH				A	NH		QF	NH		0 / 1	2–1
Davis Cup	PO	A	W	SF	QF	PO	SF	NH	QF	RR	QF	RR	A	A	1 / 8	4–2
ATP Masters 1000
Indian Wells Open	A	A	A	A	2R	A	A	NH	1R	1R	2R	A	A	A	0 / 4	2–4
Miami Open	A	A	A	A	A	A	A	NH	F	A	A	A	A	A	0 / 1	4–1
Monte-Carlo Masters	A	A	A	A	A	A	A	NH	F	2R	1R	A	A	A	0 / 3	5–2
Madrid Open	A	A	A	A	A	A	A	NH	1R	A	1R	A	A	A	0 / 2	0–2
Italian Open	A	A	A	A	A	A	A	1R	1R	A	2R	A	A	A	0 / 3	1–3
Canadian Open	A	A	A	A	A	A	A	NH	2R	F	A	A	A	A	0 / 2	5–2
Cincinnati Open	A	A	A	A	A	A	A	2R	1R	1R	1R	A	A	A	0 / 4	1–4
Shanghai Masters	A	A	A	A	A	A	A	NH			A	A	A	A	0 / 0	0–0
Paris Masters	A	A	A	A	A	A	A	A	2R	2R	A	A	A	A	0 / 2	2–2
Win–loss	0–0	0–0	0–0	0–0	1–1	0–0	0–0	1–2	10–8	6–4	2–5	0–0	0–0	0–0	0 / 21	20–20
Career statistics
	2013	2014	2015	2016	2017	2018	2019	2020	2021	2022	2023	2024	2025	2026	Career	
Tournaments	0	2	0	3	2	0	9	7	16	13	10	5	2	1	70	
Titles	0	0	0	0	0	0	0	0	0	0	0	0	0	0	0	
Finals	0	0	0	0	0	0	0	0	2	1	0	0	0	0	3	
Overall win–loss	0–0	0–2	0–0	2–2	2–2	0–0	6–9	3–7	14–15	12–12	9–11	3–6	0–2	0–1	51–69	
Year-end ranking	719	1280	1041	277	315	522	149	148	59	74	168	864	1196	–	43%	

== Significant finals ==
=== Masters 1000 finals ===
==== Doubles: 3 (3 runner-ups) ====
Result	Year	Tournament	Surface	Partner	Opponents	Score
Loss	2021	Miami Open	Hard	(United Kingdom) Neal Skupski	(Croatia) Nikola Mektić (Croatia) Mate Pavić	4–6, 4–6
Loss	2021	Monte-Carlo Masters	Clay	(United Kingdom) Neal Skupski	(Croatia) Nikola Mektić (Croatia) Mate Pavić	3–6, 6–4, [7–10]
Loss	2022	Canadian Open	Hard	(Australia) John Peers	(Netherlands) Wesley Koolhof (United Kingdom) Neal Skupski	2–6, 6–4, [6–10]

== ATP career finals ==
=== Singles: 4 (2 titles, 2 runner-ups) ===
Legend Grand Slam tournaments (0–0) ATP Finals (0–0) ATP Masters 1000 (0–0) ATP 500 (1–0) ATP 250 (1–2)	Finals by surface Hard (2–2) Clay (0–0) Grass (0–0)	Finals by setting Outdoor (2–2) Indoor (0–0)

Result	W–L	Date	Tournament	Tier	Surface	Opponent	Score
Loss	0–1	Jan 2017	Sydney International, Australia	ATP 250	Hard	(Luxembourg) Gilles Müller	6–7^{(5–7)}, 2–6
Loss	0–2	Feb 2019	Delray Beach Open, United States	ATP 250	Hard	(Moldova) Radu Albot	6–3, 3–6, 6–7^{(7–9)}
Win	1–2	Feb 2021	Murray River Open, Australia	ATP 250	Hard	(Canada) Félix Auger-Aliassime	6–2, 6–3
Win	2–2	Aug 2023	Washington Open, United States	ATP 500	Hard	(Netherlands) Tallon Griekspoor	7–5, 6–3

=== Doubles: 3 (3 runner-ups) ===
Legend Grand Slam tournaments (0–0) ATP Finals (0–0) ATP Masters 1000 (0–3) ATP 500 (0–0) ATP 250 (0–0)	Finals by surface Hard (0–2) Clay (0–1) Grass (0–0)	Finals by setting Outdoor (0–3) Indoor (0–0)

Result	W–L	Date	Tournament	Tier	Surface	Partner	Opponents	Score
Loss	0–1	Apr 2021	Miami Open, United States	Masters 1000	Hard	(United Kingdom) Neal Skupski	(Croatia) Nikola Mektić (Croatia) Mate Pavić	4–6, 4–6
Loss	0–2	Apr 2021	Monte-Carlo Masters, Monaco	Masters 1000	Clay	(United Kingdom) Neal Skupski	(Croatia) Nikola Mektić (Croatia) Mate Pavić	3–6, 6–4, [7–10]
Loss	0–3	Aug 2022	Canadian Open, Canada	Masters 1000	Hard	(Australia) John Peers	(Netherlands) Wesley Koolhof (United Kingdom) Neal Skupski	2–6, 6–4, [6–10]

== ATP Challenger finals ==
=== Singles: 15 (9–6) ===
Finals by surface
Hard (5–5)
Clay (0–0)
Grass (3–1)
Carpet (1–0)

Result	W–L	Date	Tournament	Surface	Opponent	Score
Win	1–0	Mar 2009	Jersey, Channel Islands	Hard (i)	(Czech Republic) Jan Minář	6–3, 6–2
Loss	1–1	Aug 2013	Vancouver, Canada	Hard	(Canada) Vasek Pospisil	0–6, 6–1, 5–7
Loss	1–2	Aug 2013	Aptos, United States	Hard	(United States) Bradley Klahn	6–4, 6–7^{(5–7)}, 4–6
Win	2–2	Nov 2015	Knoxville, United States	Hard (i)	(United States) Frances Tiafoe	5–7, 6–1, 6–3
Loss	2–3	Feb 2016	Dallas, United States	Hard (i)	(United Kingdom) Kyle Edmund	3–6, 2–6
Win	3–3	Mar 2016	Drummondville, Canada	Hard (i)	(United Kingdom) Edward Corrie	6–3, 6–4
Win	4–3	May 2016	Taipei, Taiwan	Carpet (i)	(Russia) Konstantin Kravchuk	3–6, 6–4, 6–4
Loss	4–4	May 2016	Busan, South Korea	Hard	(Russia) Konstantin Kravchuk	4–6, 4–6
Win	5–4	Aug 2016	Aptos, United States	Hard	(United Kingdom) Cameron Norrie	6–3, 6–4
Loss	5–5	Jun 2018	Nottingham, United Kingdom	Grass	(Australia) Alex de Minaur	6–7^{(4–7)}, 5–7
Win	6–5	Aug 2018	Vancouver, Canada	Hard	(Australia) Jason Kubler	4–6, 7–5, 7–6^{(7–3)}
Loss	6–6	Feb 2019	Quimper, France	Hard (i)	(France) Grégoire Barrère	6–4, 2–6, 3–6
Win	7–6	Jun 2019	Surbiton, United Kingdom	Grass	(Serbia) Viktor Troicki	6–2, 6–3
Win	8–6	Jun 2019	Nottingham, United Kingdom	Grass	(Russia) Evgeny Donskoy	7–6^{(7–3)}, 6–3
Win	9–6	Jun 2022	Nottingham, United Kingdom (2)	Grass	(Australia) Jordan Thompson	6–4, 6–4

=== Doubles: 2 (0–2) ===
Finals by surface
Hard (0–2)
Clay (0–0)

Result	W–L	Date	Tournament	Surface	Partner	Opponents	Score
Loss	0–1	Mar 2016	Drummondville, Canada	Hard (i)	(United Kingdom) Lloyd Glasspool	(United States) James Cerretani (United States) Max Schnur	6–3, 3–6, [9–11]
Loss	0–2	Sep 2018	Manacor, Spain	Hard	(Spain) Gerard Granollers Pujol	(Uruguay) Ariel Behar (Spain) Enrique López Pérez	w/o

== ITF Futures finals ==
=== Singles: 25 (13–12) ===
Finals by surface
Hard (15–15)
Clay (1–1)
Grass (5–2)

Result	W–L	Date	Tournament	Surface	Opponent	Score
Win	1–0	Aug 2008	Great Britain F12, Wrexham	Hard	(United Kingdom) Ian Flanagan	4–6, 6–3, 1–0 ret.
Win	2–0	Aug 2008	Great Britain F13, London	Hard	(Montenegro) Daniel Danilović	3–6, 7–6^{(9–7)}, 6–2
Win	3–0	Oct 2008	Great Britain F16, Glasgow	Hard (i)	(United Kingdom) Marcus Willis	6–2, 3–1 ret.
Loss	3–1	Oct 2009	Great Britain F15, Glasgow	Hard (i)	(Belgium) Yannick Mertens	0–6, 2–6
Loss	3–2	May 2010	Italy F7, Viterbo	Clay	(Chile) Guillermo Hormazábal	7–5, 3–6, 4–6
Loss	3–3	Sep 2010	Great Britain F13, London	Hard	(United Kingdom) Daniel Cox	1–6, 1–6
Loss	3–4	Sep 2010	Great Britain F14, Nottingham	Hard	(United Kingdom) Joshua Milton	1–6, 5–7
Loss	3–5	Oct 2010	Great Britain F16, Glasgow	Hard (i)	(Australia) Matthew Ebden	2–6, 6–3, 3–6
Loss	3–6	Oct 2010	Great Britain F17, Cardiff	Hard (i)	(Estonia) Jürgen Zopp	4–6, 5–7
Loss	3–7	Mar 2011	Great Britain F3, Tipton	Hard (i)	(Belgium) Yannick Mertens	2–6, 6–7^{(6–8)}
Loss	3–8	Mar 2011	Great Britain F4, Bath	Hard (i)	(Sweden) Michael Ryderstedt	6–1, 6–7^{(6–8)}, 3–6
Loss	3–9	Apr 2011	Thailand F2, Khon Kaen	Hard	(Thailand) Danai Udomchoke	2–6, 4–6
Loss	3–10	Jul 2011	Great Britain F10, Frinton-on-Sea	Grass	(United Kingdom) Josh Goodall	3–6, 2–6
Win	4–10	Jan 2012	Great Britain F2, Sheffield	Hard (i)	(United Kingdom) David Rice	6–2, 6–0
Win	5–10	Aug 2012	Great Britain F13, London	Hard	(United Kingdom) Daniel Cox	6–2, 7–5
Win	6–10	Aug 2012	Great Britain F15, Roehampton	Hard	(United Kingdom) Joshua Milton	6–3, 6–1
Win	7–10	Sep 2012	Great Britain F16, Nottingham	Hard	(United Kingdom) Richard Bloomfield	7–6^{(7–4)}, 7–6^{(7–2)}
Win	8–10	Mar 2013	Great Britain F6, Shrewsbury	Hard (i)	(United Kingdom) Marcus Willis	7–6^{(7–3)}, 7–6^{(7–1)}
Loss	8–11	Mar 2013	Great Britain F7, Bath	Hard (i)	(United Kingdom) Edward Corrie	3–6, 6–7^{(4–7)}
Win	9–11	May 2013	Sweden F3, Båstad	Clay	(Poland) Grzegorz Panfil	6–4, 7–6^{(7–4)}
Win	10–11	May 2015	Egypt F17, Sharm El Sheikh	Hard	(Turkey) Barış Ergüden	6–2, 6–7^{(3–7)}, 6–3
Win	11–11	Jul 2015	Great Britain F6, Frinton-on-Sea	Grass	(United Kingdom) Daniel Smethurst	7–6^{(7–4)}, 7–6^{(10–8)}
Win	12–11	Jul 2015	Great Britain F7, Felixstowe	Grass	(United Kingdom) Daniel Cox	6–2, 6–1
Loss	12–12	Sep 2015	Great Britain F8, Roehampton	Hard	(France) Quentin Halys	1–6, 7–6^{(7–5)}, 5–7
Win	13–12	Sep 2015	Great Britain F9, Nottingham	Hard	(United Kingdom) Daniel Cox	6–7^{(4–7)}, 6–3, 6–1

=== Doubles: 18 (7–11) ===
Finals by surface
Hard (6–8)
Clay (1–1)
Grass (0–2)

Result	W–L	Date	Tournament	Surface	Partner	Opponents	Score
Loss	0–1	Oct 2006	Great Britain F20, Nottingham	Hard	(United Kingdom) Mark Hilton	(United Kingdom) Neil Bamford (United Kingdom) Jim May	2–6, 7–6^{(7–4)}, 0–6
Loss	0–2	Oct 2007	Great Britain F20, Glasgow	Hard (i)	(Czech Republic) Ladislav Chramosta	(United Kingdom) Josh Goodall (United Kingdom) Ken Skupski	6–7^{(5–7)}, 6–7^{(7–9)}
Win	1–2	May 2008	Great Britain F8, Edinburgh	Clay	(United Kingdom) Joshua Milton	(Argentina) Diego Álvarez (Italy) Federico Torresi	6–2, 6–2
Loss	1–3	Oct 2008	Spain F36, Martos	Hard	(United Kingdom) Daniel Cox	(Slovakia) Kamil Čapkovič (Russia) Dmitri Sitak	4–6, 5–2 ret.
Loss	1–4	Feb 2009	France F2, Feucherolles	Hard (i)	(United Kingdom) Marcus Willis	(France) Olivier Charroin (France) Nicolas Tourte	3–6, 4–6
Win	2–4	Mar 2009	Great Britain F3, Tipton	Hard (i)	(Finland) Henri Kontinen	(United States) Scott Oudsema (United States) Phillip Simmonds	6–7^{(5–7)}, 7–6^{(7–4)}, [10–4]
Loss	2–5	May 2010	Italy F8, Pozzuoli	Clay	(Lithuania) Laurynas Grigelis	(Argentina) Juan-Martín Aranguren (Argentina) Alejandro Fabbri	4–6, 6–7^{(4–7)}
Win	3–5	Sep 2010	Great Britain F14, Nottingham	Hard	(United Kingdom) Lewis Burton	(United Kingdom) Sean Thornley (United Kingdom) Marcus Willis	7–5, 1–6, [13–11]
Win	4–5	Sep 2010	Great Britain F15, Wrexham	Hard	(United Kingdom) Lewis Burton	(United Kingdom) David Rice (United Kingdom) Sean Thornley	7–6^{(8–6)}, 6–4
Win	5–5	Oct 2010	Great Britain F16, Glasgow	Hard (i)	(United Kingdom) Lewis Burton	(Australia) Matthew Ebden (United Kingdom) Joshua Milton	7–6^{(7–1)}, 3–6, [10–6]
Win	6–5	Jul 2011	Great Britain F11, Chiswick	Hard	(United Kingdom) Liam Broady	(United Kingdom) Lewis Burton (United Kingdom) Edward Corrie	7–6^{(7–3)}, 4–6, [10–7]
Loss	6–6	Oct 2011	Great Britain F16, Glasgow	Hard (i)	(United Kingdom) Andrew Fitzpatrick	(Italy) Fabio Colangelo (Italy) Marco Crugnola	4–6, 6–2, [13–15]
Loss	6–7	Jul 2012	Great Britain F9, Manchester	Grass	(United Kingdom) Tom Burn	(United Kingdom) Josh Goodall (United Kingdom) Marcus Willis	2–6, 6–7^{(3–7)}
Loss	6–8	Jul 2012	Great Britain F11, Felixstowe	Grass	(United Kingdom) Tom Burn	(United Kingdom) Lewis Burton (United Kingdom) Edward Corrie	2–6, 2–6
Loss	6–9	Aug 2012	Great Britain F13, London	Hard	(United Kingdom) Tom Burn	(United Kingdom) Andrew Fitzpatrick (United Kingdom) Sean Thornley	6–7^{(2–7)}, 2–6
Loss	6–10	Feb 2013	Great Britain F3, Sheffield	Hard (i)	(United Kingdom) Andrew Fitzpatrick	(United Kingdom) David Rice (United Kingdom) Sean Thornley	2–6, 6–7^{(6–8)}
Win	7–10	Mar 2013	Great Britain F7, Bath	Hard (i)	(United Kingdom) Lewis Burton	(Czech Republic) Jan Minář (Slovakia) Marek Semjan	5–7, 6–1, [10–5]
Loss	7–11	Mar 2013	Great Britain F8, Sunderland	Hard (i)	(United Kingdom) Lewis Burton	(United Kingdom) Daniel Smethurst (United Kingdom) Alexander Ward	5–7, 6–7^{(4–7)}

== Wins over top 10 players ==
Evans has a 6–31 record against players who were, at the time the match was played, ranked in the top 10.

Season	2006–2016	2017	2018	2019	2020	2021	2022	2023	2024	2025	Total
Wins	0	2	0	1	0	1	1	1	0	0	6

#	Player	Rk	Tournament	Surface	Rd	Score	Rk
2017
1.	(Austria) Dominic Thiem	8	Sydney, Australia	Hard	QF	3–6, 6–4, 6–1	67
2.	(Croatia) Marin Čilić	7	Australian Open, Melbourne, Australia	Hard	2R	3–6, 7–5, 6–3, 6–3	51
2019
3.	(United States) John Isner	9	Delray Beach, United States	Hard	SF	3–6, 6–2, 6–3	148
2021
4.	(Serbia) Novak Djokovic	1	Monte Carlo, Monaco	Clay	3R	6–4, 7–5	33
2022
5.	Andrey Rublev	8	Montreal, Canada	Hard	2R	6–4, 6–4	39
2023
6.	(United States) Frances Tiafoe	10	Washington DC, United States	Hard	QF	6–4, 7–5	30

== National participation ==
=== Davis Cup (18–24) ===
Group membership World Group / Finals (12–15) Qualifying round / Play-offs (3–2) Group I (3–5) Group II (0–2)	Matches by type Singles (14–22) Doubles (4–2)	Matches by surface Hard (15–21) Clay (3–3)	Matches by venue Great Britain (11–14) Away (4–7) Neutral (3–3)

Date	Venue	Surface	Round	Opponent nation	Score	Match	Opponent player(s)	W/L	Match score
2009
Sep 2009	Liverpool	Hard (i)	G1 PO	Poland	2–3	Singles 2	Jerzy Janowicz	Loss	3–6, 3–6, 6–7^{(5–7)}
Sep 2009	Liverpool	Hard (i)	G1 PO	Poland	2–3	Singles 5 (decider)	Michał Przysiężny	Loss	2–6, 1–6, 5–7
2010
Mar 2010	Vilnius	Hard (i)	G2 1R	Lithuania	2–3	Singles 2	Ričardas Berankis	Loss	1–6, 6–4, 6–7^{(5–7)}, 6–3, 3–6
Mar 2010	Vilnius	Hard (i)	G2 1R	Lithuania	2–3	Singles 5 (decider)	Laurynas Grigelis	Loss	7–6^{(8–6)}, 0–6, 5–7, 6–2, 4–6
2012
Feb 2012	Glasgow	Hard (i)	G1 1R	Slovakia	3–2	Singles 1	Lukáš Lacko	Win	6–3, 7–5, 7–5
Feb 2012	Glasgow	Hard (i)	G1 1R	Slovakia	3–2	Singles 5 (decider)	Martin Kližan	Win	6–1, 6–1, 4–6, 3–6, 6–3
Apr 2012	Glasgow	Hard (i)	G1 2R	Belgium	1–4	Singles 2	Olivier Rochus	Loss	6–3, 4–6, 6–7^{(7–9)}, 4–6
Apr 2012	Glasgow	Hard (i)	G1 2R	Belgium	1–4	Singles 5 (dead)	Ruben Bemelmans	Loss	4–6, 4–6
2013
Apr 2013	Coventry	Hard (i)	G1 2R	Russia	3–2	Singles 1	Dmitry Tursunov	Loss	4–6, 7–6^{(7–5)}, 4–6, 7–5, 4–6
Apr 2013	Coventry	Hard (i)	G1 2R	Russia	3–2	Singles 5 (decider)	Evgeny Donskoy	Win	6–4, 6–4, 6–1
Sep 2013	Umag	Clay	PO	Croatia	4–1	Singles 2	Ivan Dodig	Loss	3–6, 2–6, 3–6
Sep 2013	Umag	Clay	PO	Croatia	4–1	Singles 5 (dead)	Mate Pavić	Win	6–4, 7–6^{(7–4)}
2015
Sep 2015	Glasgow	Hard (i)	SF	Australia	3–2	Singles 2	Bernard Tomic	Loss	3–6, 6–7^{(2–7)}, 7–6^{(7–4)}, 4–6
Sep 2015	Glasgow	Hard (i)	SF	Australia	3–2	Singles 5 (dead)	Thanasi Kokkinakis	Loss	5–7, 4–6
2016
Mar 2016	Birmingham	Hard (i)	1R	Japan	3–1	Singles 2	Kei Nishikori	Loss	3–6, 5–7, 6–7^{(3–7)}
Sep 2016	Glasgow	Hard (i)	SF	Argentina	2–3	Singles 5 (decider)	Leonardo Mayer	Loss	6–4, 3–6, 2–6, 4–6
2017
Feb 2017	Ottawa	Hard (i)	1R	Canada	3–2	Singles 1	Denis Shapovalov	Win	6–3, 6–4, 6–4
Feb 2017	Ottawa	Hard (i)	1R	Canada	3–2	Singles 4	Vasek Pospisil	Loss	6–7^{(3–7)}, 4–6, 6–3, 6–7^{(5–7)}
Apr 2017	Rouen	Clay (i)	QF	France	1–4	Singles 2	Jérémy Chardy	Loss	2–6, 3–6, 3–6
Apr 2017	Rouen	Clay (i)	QF	France	1–4	Singles 4 (dead)	Julien Benneteau	Win	6–1, 6–2
2018
Sep 2018	Glasgow	Hard (i)	PO	Uzbekistan	3–1	Singles 1	Denis Istomin	Win	7–6^{(7–4)}, 4–6, 0–6, 6–4, 7–5
2019
Nov 2019	Madrid	Hard (i)	RR	Netherlands	2–1	Singles 2	Robin Haase	Loss	6–3, 6–7^{(5–7)}, 4–6
Nov 2019	Madrid	Hard (i)	RR	Kazakhstan	2–1	Singles 2	Alexander Bublik	Loss	7–5, 4–6, 1–6
Nov 2019	Madrid	Hard (i)	QF	Germany	2–0	Singles 2	Jan-Lennard Struff	Win	7–6^{(8–6)}, 3–6, 7–6^{(7–2)}
Nov 2019	Madrid	Hard (i)	SF	Spain	1–2	Singles 2	Rafael Nadal	Loss	4–6, 0–6
2020–21
Nov 2021	Innsbruck	Hard (i)	RR	France	2–1	Singles 1	Adrian Mannarino	Win	7–5, 6–4
Nov 2021	Innsbruck	Hard (i)	RR	Czech Republic	2–1	Singles 1	Tomáš Macháč	Loss	2–6, 5–7
Nov 2021	Innsbruck	Hard (i)	QF	Germany	1–2	Singles 1	Peter Gojowczyk	Win	6–2, 6–1
2022
Sep 2022	Glasgow	Hard (i)	RR	United States	1–2	Singles 1	Tommy Paul	Loss	4–6, 6–4, 4–6
Sep 2022	Glasgow	Hard (i)	RR	Netherlands	1–2	Singles 1	Tallon Griekspoor	Win	6–4, 6–4
2023
Feb 2023	Cota	Clay (i)	QR	Colombia	3–1	Singles 1	Nicolás Mejía	Loss	2–6, 6–2, 4–6
Feb 2023	Cota	Clay (i)	QR	Colombia	3–1	Doubles (w/ N Skupski)	JS Cabal / R Farah	Win	6–4, 6–4
Sep 2023	Manchester	Hard (i)	RR	Australia	2–1	Singles 2	Alex de Minaur	Win	6–1, 2–6, 6–4
Sep 2023	Manchester	Hard (i)	RR	Australia	2–1	Doubles (w/ N Skupski)	M Ebden / M Purcell	Loss	6–7^{(5–7)}, 4–6
Sep 2023	Manchester	Hard (i)	RR	Switzerland	2–1	Doubles (w/ N Skupski)	D Stricker / S Wawrinka	Win	6–3, 6–3
Sep 2023	Manchester	Hard (i)	RR	France	2–1	Singles 1	Arthur Fils	Win	3–6, 6–3, 6–4
Sep 2023	Manchester	Hard (i)	RR	France	2–1	Doubles (w/ N Skupski)	N Mahut / É Roger-Vasselin	Win	1–6, 7–6^{(7–4)}, 7–6^{(8–6)}
2024
Sep 2024	Manchester	Hard (i)	RR	Finland	2–1	Singles 1	Eero Vasa	Win	7–6^{(7–3)}, 6–2
Sep 2024	Manchester	Hard (i)	RR	Finland	2–1	Doubles (w/ N Skupski)	H Heliövaara / O Virtanen	Loss	6–7^{(4–7)}, 5–7
Sep 2024	Manchester	Hard (i)	RR	Argentina	1–2	Singles 1	Tomás Martín Etcheverry	Loss	2–6, 5–7
Sep 2024	Manchester	Hard (i)	RR	Argentina	1–2	Doubles (w/ N Skupski)	M González / A Molteni	Win	6–3, 7–5
Sep 2024	Manchester	Hard (i)	RR	Canada	1–2	Singles 1	Denis Shapovalov	Loss	0–6, 5–7

=== United Cup (1–3) ===
Matches by type
Singles (1–2)
Mixed doubles (0–1)

Venue	Surface	Rd	Opponent nation	Score	Match type	Opponent player(s)	W/L	Match score
2023
Sydney	Hard	RR	Australia	3–2	Singles	Jason Kubler	Loss	3–6, 6–7^{(3–7)}
Sydney	Hard	RR	Spain	4–1	Singles	Albert Ramos Viñolas	Win	6–3, 1–6, 6–3
Sydney	Hard	HCF	United States	1–4	Singles	Frances Tiafoe	Loss	6–3, 5–7, 3–6
Sydney	Hard	HCF	United States	1–4	Mixed doubles (w/ H Dart)	J Pegula / T Fritz	Loss	4–6, 4–6

=== ATP Cup (8–1) ===
Matches by type
Singles (6–1)
Doubles (2–0)

Venue	Surface	Rd	Opponent nation	Score	Match	Opponent player(s)	W/L	Match score
2020
Sydney	Hard	RR	Bulgaria	1–2	Singles	Grigor Dimitrov	Loss	6–2, 4–6, 1–6
Sydney	Hard	RR	Belgium	2–1	Singles	David Goffin	Win	6–4, 6–4
Sydney	Hard	RR	Moldova	3–0	Singles	Radu Albot	Win	6–2, 6–2
Sydney	Hard	QF	Australia	1–2	Singles	Alex de Minaur	Win	7–6^{(7–4)}, 4–6, 7–6^{(7–2)}
2022
Sydney	Hard	RR	Germany	2–1	Singles	Jan-Lennard Struff	Win	6–1, 6–2
Sydney	Hard	RR	Germany	2–1	Doubles (w/ J Murray)	K Krawietz / A Zverev	Win	6–3, 6–4
Sydney	Hard	RR	Canada	1–2	Singles	Denis Shapovalov	Win	6–4, 6–4
Sydney	Hard	RR	United States	2–1	Singles	John Isner	Win	6–4, 7–6^{(7–3)}
Sydney	Hard	RR	United States	2–1	Doubles (w/ J Murray)	T Fritz / J Isner	Win	6–7^{(3–7)}, 7–5, [10–8]
