= 2011 Internazionali Tennis Val Gardena Südtirol – Singles =

Singles
- 2011 Internazionali Tennis Val Gardena Südtirol

Final
- Champion: (United States) Rajeev Ram
- Runner-up: (Czech Republic) Jan Hernych
- Score: 7–5, 3–6, 7–6^{(8–6)}

Events
Singles	Doubles
← 2010 ·	Internazionali Tennis Val Gardena Südtirol	· 2012 →

Michał Przysiężny was the defending champion, but lost to Rajeev Ram in the first round.
Ram won the title, defeating Jan Hernych 7–5, 3–6, 7–6^{(8–6)} in the final.

== Seeds ==
1. (Germany) Philipp Petzschner (semifinals)
2. (Israel) Dudi Sela (first round)
3. (Romania) Adrian Ungur (second round)
4. (Slovakia) Lukáš Lacko (second round)
5. (Italy) Simone Bolelli (first round)
6. (Netherlands) Igor Sijsling (first round)
7. (Germany) Dustin Brown (first round)
8. (Germany) Daniel Brands (first round)

== Draw ==
=== Key ===
- Q = Qualifier
- WC = Wild card
- LL = Lucky loser
- Alt = Alternate
- SE = Special exempt
- PR = Protected ranking
- ITF = ITF entry
- JE = Junior exempt
- w/o = Walkover
- r = Retired
- d = Defaulted
- SR = Special ranking

=== Finals ===
Semifinals
1	(Germany) Philipp Petzschner	6	2	3
(Czech Republic) Jan Hernych	3	6	6
(United States) Rajeev Ram	7	6^{3}	7^{7}
(Russia) Konstantin Kravchuk	5	7^{7}	6^{2}

Final
(Czech Republic) Jan Hernych	5	6	6^{6}
(United States) Rajeev Ram	7	3	7^{8}

=== Top half ===
First round
1	(Germany) P Petzschner	7^{16}	6
(Czech Republic) J Mertl	6^{14}	3
WC	(Italy) Claudio Grassi	3	6^{3}
(Austria) P Oswald	6	7^{7}
(Germany) B Becker	7^{8}	3	6
Q	(Poland) M Kowalczyk	6^{6}	6	4
(Lithuania) L Grigelis	3	6	6
7	(Germany) D Brown	6	2	4
4	(Slovakia) L Lacko	6	7^{7}
(Canada) F Dancevic	4	6^{4}
Q	(Czech Republic) Michal Schmid	3	4
(Argentina) F Delbonis	6	6
(Austria) M Fischer	7^{7}	4	5
(Czech Republic) J Hernych	6^{5}	6	7
(Uzbekistan) F Dustov	3	7^{7}	7^{7}
5	(Italy) S Bolelli	6	6^{5}	6^{4}

Second round
1	(Germany) P Petzschner	7^{7}	6
(Austria) P Oswald	6^{4}	3
(Germany) B Becker	3	7^{7}	6
(Lithuania) L Grigelis	6	6^{5}	4
4	(Slovakia) L Lacko	4	6^{2}
(Argentina) F Delbonis	6	7^{7}
(Czech Republic) J Hernych	7	6
(Uzbekistan) F Dustov	5	4

Quarterfinals
1	(Germany) P Petzschner	6^{6}	7^{7}	6
(Germany) B Becker	7^{8}	6^{5}	2
(Argentina) F Delbonis	4	3
(Czech Republic) J Hernych	6	6

Semifinals
1	(Germany) P Petzschner	6	2	3
(Czech Republic) J Hernych	3	6	6

=== Bottom half ===
First round
6	(Netherlands) I Sijsling	6^{4}	3
(Russia) A Kudryavtsev	7^{7}	6
(Poland) M Przysiężny	7^{8}	3	3
(United States) R Ram	6^{6}	6	6
WC	(Italy) Federico Gaio	4	6	6^{7}
Q	(Germany) M Zimmermann	6	3	7^{9}
Q	(Russia) M Elgin	1	0
3	(Romania) A Ungur	6	6
8	(Germany) D Brands	4	6^{4}
(Belgium) R Bemelmans	6	7^{7}
WC	(Italy) M Trevisan	3	2
(Romania) M Copil	6	6
(Germany) D Meffert	2	7^{8}	3
(Poland) J Janowicz	6	6^{6}	6
(Russia) K Kravchuk	6	6^{6}	7
2/WC	(Israel) D Sela	4	7^{8}	5

Second round
(Russia) A Kudryavtsev	6^{6}	7^{7}	3
(United States) R Ram	7^{8}	6^{5}	6
Q	(Germany) M Zimmermann	6	6^{1}	6
3	(Romania) A Ungur	4	7^{7}	4
(Belgium) R Bemelmans	7^{7}	7^{7}
(Romania) M Copil	6^{5}	6^{2}
(Poland) J Janowicz	6^{4}	7^{7}	6^{2}
(Russia) K Kravchuk	7^{7}	6^{3}	7^{7}

Quarterfinals
(United States) R Ram	6	6
Q	(Germany) M Zimmermann	4	4
(Belgium) R Bemelmans	4	7^{9}	6^{5}
(Russia) K Kravchuk	6	6^{7}	7^{7}

Semifinals
(United States) R Ram	7	6^{3}	7^{7}
(Russia) K Kravchuk	5	7^{7}	6^{2}
