= 2009 The Caversham International – Singles =

Singles
- 2009 The Caversham International

Final
- Champion: (United Kingdom) Daniel Evans
- Runner-up: (Czech Republic) Jan Minář
- Score: 6–3, 6–2

Events
Singles	Doubles
← 2008 ·	The Caversham International	· 2010 →

Adrian Mannarino was the defending champion.
Daniel Evans defeated Jan Minář in the final (6–3, 6–2).

== Seeds ==
1. (France) Adrian Mannarino (quarterfinals)
2. (Germany) Simon Stadler (second round)
3. (United Kingdom) Alex Bogdanovic (semifinals)
4. (France) Sébastien de Chaunac (semifinals)
5. (Austria) Martin Fischer (second round)
6. (Italy) Andrea Stoppini (quarterfinals)
7. (Australia) Robert Smeets (first round)
8. (United States) Michael Yani (second round)

== Draw ==
Key

- Q = Qualifier
- WC = Wild card
- LL = Lucky loser
- Alt = Alternate
- ITF = ITF entry
- PR = Protected ranking
- SR = Special ranking
- SE = Special exempt
- JE = Junior exempt
- JR = Junior Accelerator Programme entrant
- CO = College Accelerator Programme entrant
- NG = Next Gen Accelerator Program entrant
- w/o = Walkover
- r = Retired
- d = Defaulted

=== Final four ===
Semifinals
(Czech Republic) Jan Minář	6	6
4	(France) Sébastien de Chaunac	3	1
3	(United Kingdom) Alex Bogdanovic	6	6^{4}	4
WC	(United Kingdom) Daniel Evans	1	7	6

Final
(Czech Republic) Jan Minář	3	2
WC	(United Kingdom) Daniel Evans	6	6

=== Top half ===
First round
1	(France) A Mannarino
Q	(United Kingdom) J Marray
(Netherlands) M Koning
(Australia) M Ebden
(Czech Republic) J Minář
(Sweden) J Johansson
Q	(Netherlands) I Sijsling
8	(United States) M Yani
4	(France) S de Chaunac
Q	(United States) P Simmonds
(Germany) M Bachinger
(Italy) R Ghedin
(United Kingdom) J Ward
(Spain) C Poch-Gradin
(Latvia) D Pavlovs
6	(Italy) A Stoppini

Second round
1	(France) A Mannarino
(Australia) M Ebden
(Czech Republic) J Minář
8	(United States) M Yani
4	(France) S de Chaunac
(Italy) R Ghedin
(Spain) C Poch-Gradin
6	(Italy) A Stoppini

Quarterfinals
1	(France) A Mannarino
(Czech Republic) J Minář
4	(France) S de Chaunac
6	(Italy) A Stoppini

Semifinals
(Czech Republic) J Minář	6	6
4	(France) S de Chaunac	3	1

=== Bottom half ===
First round
7	(Australia) R Smeets
WC	(United Kingdom) D Cox
Q	(France) Jean-Noel Insausti
(Republic of Ireland) C Niland
(United Kingdom) R Bloomfield
(France) D Guez
WC	(United Kingdom) J Milton
3	(United Kingdom) A Bogdanovic
5	(Austria) M Fischer
(South Africa) F Wolmarans
(France) S Robert
(Denmark) F Nielsen
WC	(United Kingdom) D Evans
WC	(United Kingdom) C Fleming
(Ukraine) S Bubka
2	(Germany) S Stadler

Second round
WC	(United Kingdom) D Cox
(Republic of Ireland) C Niland
(France) D Guez
3	(United Kingdom) A Bogdanovic
5	(Austria) M Fischer
(France) S Robert
WC	(United Kingdom) D Evans
2	(Germany) S Stadler

Quarterfinals
WC	(United Kingdom) D Cox
3	(United Kingdom) A Bogdanovic
(France) S Robert
WC	(United Kingdom) D Evans

Semifinals
3	(United Kingdom) A Bogdanovic	6	6^{4}	4
WC	(United Kingdom) D Evans	1	7	6
