= 2009 The Caversham International – Doubles =

Doubles
- 2009 The Caversham International

Final
- Champions: (United States) Eric Butorac (United States) Travis Rettenmaier
- Runners-up: (United Kingdom) Colin Fleming (United Kingdom) Ken Skupski
- Score: 6–4, 6–3

Events
Singles	Doubles
← 2008 ·	The Caversham International	· 2010 →

Colin Fleming and Ken Skupski were the defending champions; however, they lost to Eric Butorac and Travis Rettenmaier in the grand finale (6–4, 6–3).

== Seeds ==
1. (Australia) Ashley Fisher / (Australia) Stephen Huss (first round)
2. (United States) Eric Butorac / (United States) Travis Rettenmaier (champions)
3. (United States) David Martin / (Czech Republic) Tomáš Zíb (semifinals)
4. (France) Olivier Charroin / (France) Nicolas Tourte (first round)

== Draw ==
=== Key ===
- Q = Qualifier
- WC = Wild card
- LL = Lucky loser
- Alt = Alternate
- SE = Special exempt
- PR = Protected ranking
- ITF = ITF entry
- JE = Junior exempt
- w/o = Walkover
- r = Retired
- d = Defaulted
- SR = Special ranking

=== Draw ===
First round
1	(Australia) A Fisher (Australia) S Huss	5	5
(Austria) M Fischer (Denmark) F Nielsen	7	7
(Spain) C Poch-Gradin (France) S Robert	3	6	[6]
WC	(United Kingdom) C Fleming (United Kingdom) K Skupski	6	1	[10]
3	(United States) D Martin (Czech Republic) T Zíb	7	6
WC	(United Kingdom) D Smethurst (United Kingdom) M Willis	5	4
(Germany) M Bachinger (Germany) S Stadler	6^{2}	4
WC	(United Kingdom) J Delgado (United Kingdom) J Marray	7	6
(Netherlands) M Koning (Australia) R Smeets	6^{2}	6	[8]
(South Africa) F Wolmarans (United States) M Yani	7	2	[10]
(United States) B Battistone (India) H Mankad	3	6	[10]
4	(France) O Charroin (France) N Tourte	6	3	[4]
(United Kingdom) A Bogdanovic (United Kingdom) J Ward	3	2
(Latvia) D Pavlovs (Italy) A Stoppini	6	6
(Ukraine) S Bubka (Netherlands) I Sijsling	3	6^{4}
2	(United States) E Butorac (United States) T Rettenmaier	6	7

Quarterfinals
(Austria) M Fischer (Denmark) F Nielsen	7	3	[5]
WC	(United Kingdom) C Fleming (United Kingdom) K Skupski	6^{5}	6	[10]
3	(United States) D Martin (Czech Republic) T Zíb	7	6
WC	(United Kingdom) J Delgado (United Kingdom) J Marray	6^{1}	2
(South Africa) F Wolmarans (United States) M Yani	4	7	[6]
(United States) B Battistone (India) H Mankad	6	5	[10]
(Latvia) D Pavlovs (Italy) A Stoppini	7	4	[8]
2	(United States) E Butorac (United States) T Rettenmaier	6^{3}	6	[10]

Semifinals
WC	(United Kingdom) C Fleming (United Kingdom) K Skupski	6	6
3	(United States) D Martin (Czech Republic) T Zíb	3	4
(United States) B Battistone (India) H Mankad	1	7	[7]
2	(United States) E Butorac (United States) T Rettenmaier	6	6^{11}	[10]

Finals
WC	(United Kingdom) C Fleming (United Kingdom) K Skupski	4	3
2	(United States) E Butorac (United States) T Rettenmaier	6	6
