= 2011 Internazionali Tennis Val Gardena Südtirol – Doubles =

Doubles
- 2011 Internazionali Tennis Val Gardena Südtirol

Final
- Champions: (Germany) Dustin Brown (Croatia) Lovro Zovko
- Runners-up: (Germany) Philipp Petzschner (Germany) Alexander Waske
- Score: 6–4, 7–6^{(7–4)}

Events
Singles	Doubles
← 2010 ·	Internazionali Tennis Val Gardena Südtirol	· 2012 →

Michail Elgin and Alexandre Kudryavtsev are the defending champions but lost in the first round.
Dustin Brown and Lovro Zovko won the title, defeating Philipp Petzschner and Alexander Waske 6–4, 7–6^{(7–4)} in the final.

== Seeds ==
1. (Russia) Michail Elgin / (Russia) Alexandre Kudryavtsev (first round)
2. (Germany) Philipp Petzschner / (Germany) Alexander Waske (final)
3. (Germany) Dustin Brown / (Croatia) Lovro Zovko (champions)
4. (Poland) Tomasz Bednarek / (Poland) Mateusz Kowalczyk (semifinals)

== Draw ==
=== Key ===
- Q = Qualifier
- WC = Wild card
- LL = Lucky loser
- Alt = Alternate
- SE = Special exempt
- PR = Protected ranking
- ITF = ITF entry
- JE = Junior exempt
- w/o = Walkover
- r = Retired
- d = Defaulted
- SR = Special ranking

=== Draw ===
First round
1	(Russia) M Elgin (Russia) A Kudryavtsev	4	6	[6]
(Germany) B Becker (Netherlands) M Middelkoop	6	2	[10]
WC	(Italy) Philip Lageder (Germany) D Meffert	6^{2}	5
(Czech Republic) J Hernych (Czech Republic) J Mertl	7^{7}	7
3	(Germany) D Brown (Croatia) L Zovko	6	4	[10]
(Uzbekistan) F Dustov (Italy) A Motti	3	6	[5]
(Italy) Claudio Grassi (Lithuania) L Grigelis	4	6^{4}
(Belgium) R Bemelmans (Netherlands) I Sijsling	6	7^{7}
(Poland) A Kapaś (Poland) M Przysiężny	6	6^{2}	[11]
(India) P Raja (India) D Sharan	3	7^{7}	[9]
(Italy) Giuseppe Menga (Italy) Patrick Prader	5	4
4	(Poland) T Bednarek (Poland) M Kowalczyk	7	6
(Poland) J Janowicz (Russia) K Kravchuk	3	6	[7]
(Austria) M Fischer (Austria) P Oswald	6	3	[10]
WC	(Italy) Francesco Borgo (Italy) M Bortolotti	3	2
2	(Germany) P Petzschner (Germany) A Waske	6	6

Quarterfinals
(Germany) B Becker (Netherlands) M Middelkoop	1	3
(Czech Republic) J Hernych (Czech Republic) J Mertl	6	6
3	(Germany) D Brown (Croatia) L Zovko	7	6
(Belgium) R Bemelmans (Netherlands) I Sijsling	5	4
(Poland) A Kapaś (Poland) M Przysiężny	4	7^{7}	[8]
4	(Poland) T Bednarek (Poland) M Kowalczyk	6	6^{5}	[10]
(Austria) M Fischer (Austria) P Oswald	2	6^{3}
2	(Germany) P Petzschner (Germany) A Waske	6	7^{7}

Semifinals
(Czech Republic) J Hernych (Czech Republic) J Mertl	3	4
3	(Germany) D Brown (Croatia) L Zovko	6	6
4	(Poland) T Bednarek (Poland) M Kowalczyk	3	4
2	(Germany) P Petzschner (Germany) A Waske	6	6

Final
3	(Germany) D Brown (Croatia) L Zovko	6	7^{7}
2	(Germany) P Petzschner (Germany) A Waske	4	6^{4}
