= 2010 The Jersey International – Doubles =

Doubles
- 2010 The Jersey International

Final
- Champions: (India) Rohan Bopanna (United Kingdom) Ken Skupski
- Runners-up: (United Kingdom) Jonathan Marray (United Kingdom) Jamie Murray
- Score: 6–2, 2–6, [10–6]

Events
Singles	Doubles
← 2009 ·	The Jersey International	· 2011 →

Eric Butorac and Travis Rettenmaier were the defending champions, but they chose to not participate this year.
Rohan Bopanna and Ken Skupski won in the final 6–2, 2–6, [10–6], against Jonathan Marray and Jamie Murray.

== Seeds ==
1. (India) Rohan Bopanna / (United Kingdom) Ken Skupski (champions)
2. (United Kingdom) Jonathan Marray / (United Kingdom) Jamie Murray (final)
3. (Switzerland) Yves Allegro / (South Africa) Jeff Coetzee (first round)
4. (France) Nicolas Mahut / (Croatia) Lovro Zovko (semifinals)

== Draw ==
=== Key ===
- Q = Qualifier
- WC = Wild card
- LL = Lucky loser
- Alt = Alternate
- SE = Special exempt
- PR = Protected ranking
- ITF = ITF entry
- JE = Junior exempt
- w/o = Walkover
- r = Retired
- d = Defaulted
- SR = Special ranking

=== Draw ===
First round
1	(India) R Bopanna (United Kingdom) K Skupski	6	6
WC	(United Kingdom) O Golding (United Kingdom) N Pauffley	1	3
(Ukraine) S Bubka (Netherlands) I Sijsling	6^{3}	2
WC	(United States) B Battistone (United States) R DeHeart	7	6
3	(Switzerland) Y Allegro (South Africa) J Coetzee	4	3
(United Kingdom) C Eaton (United Kingdom) D Inglot	6	6
(Philippines) TC Huey (India) H Mankad	3	5
(Austria) M Fischer (Austria) P Oswald	6	7
(Belgium) N Desein (Belgium) Y Mertens	2	2
(Belarus) U Ignatik (Republic of Ireland) C Niland	6	6
(United Kingdom) D Evans (United Kingdom) D Smethurst	5	4
4	(France) N Mahut (Croatia) L Zovko	7	6
(Germany) M Emmrich (Sweden) A Siljeström	4	6^{5}
(Denmark) F Nielsen (Australia) J Sirianni	6	7
(United Kingdom) J Goodall (Australia) S Groth	6^{3}	7	[12]
2	(United Kingdom) J Marray (United Kingdom) J Murray	7	5	[14]

Quarterfinals
1	(India) R Bopanna (United Kingdom) K Skupski	7	6
WC	(United States) B Battistone (United States) R DeHeart	6^{1}	4
(United Kingdom) C Eaton (United Kingdom) D Inglot	6^{3}	6^{5}
(Austria) M Fischer (Austria) P Oswald	7	7
(Belarus) U Ignatik (Republic of Ireland) C Niland	6	2	[6]
4	(France) N Mahut (Croatia) L Zovko	2	6	[10]
(Denmark) F Nielsen (Australia) J Sirianni	1	2
2	(United Kingdom) J Marray (United Kingdom) J Murray	6	6

Semifinals
1	(India) R Bopanna (United Kingdom) K Skupski	6	6^{4}	[10]
(Austria) M Fischer (Austria) P Oswald	3	7	[6]
4	(France) N Mahut (Croatia) L Zovko	6^{6}	3
2	(United Kingdom) J Marray (United Kingdom) J Murray	7	6

Finals
1	(India) R Bopanna (United Kingdom) K Skupski	6	2	[10]
2	(United Kingdom) J Marray (United Kingdom) J Murray	2	6	[6]
