= 2013 Sparkasse ATP Challenger – Singles =

Singles
- 2013 Sparkasse ATP Challenger

Final
- Champion: (Italy) Andreas Seppi
- Runner-up: (Germany) Simon Greul
- Score: 7–6^{(7–4)}, 6–2

Events
Singles	Doubles
← 2012 ·	Sparkasse ATP Challenger	· 2014 →

Benjamin Becker is the defending champion, but lost in the quarterfinals to fifth seeded Teymuraz Gabashvili.
Top seed Andreas Seppi defeated surprise finalist Simon Greul.

== Seeds ==
1. (Italy) Andreas Seppi (champion)
2. (Poland) Michał Przysiężny (first round)
3. (Israel) Dudi Sela (first round)
4. (Germany) Benjamin Becker (quarterfinals)
5. (Russia) Teymuraz Gabashvili (semifinals)
6. (Netherlands) Jesse Huta Galung (second round)
7. (Italy) Matteo Viola (first round)
8. (Canada) Frank Dancevic (quarterfinals)

== Draw ==
=== Key ===
- Q = Qualifier
- WC = Wild card
- LL = Lucky loser
- Alt = Alternate
- SE = Special exempt
- PR = Protected ranking
- ITF = ITF entry
- JE = Junior exempt
- w/o = Walkover
- r = Retired
- d = Defaulted
- SR = Special ranking

=== Finals ===
Semifinals
1/WC	(Italy) Andreas Seppi	7^{10}	6^{6}	6
5	(Russia) Teymuraz Gabashvili	6^{8}	7^{8}	3
(Germany) Simon Greul	6	7
(Germany) Dustin Brown	3	5

Final
1/WC	(Italy) Andreas Seppi	7^{7}	6
(Germany) Simon Greul	6^{4}	2

=== Top half ===
First round
^{1/WC}	(Italy) A Seppi	7^{7}	6
(Netherlands) T de Bakker	6^{3}	4
WC	(Uzbekistan) F Dustov	6	6
(Italy) A Arnaboldi	2	4
(Belgium) R Bemelmans	4	1
(Czech Republic) J Mertl	6	6
WC	(Italy) M Donati	7^{7}	1	1
8	(Canada) F Dancevic	6^{5}	6	6
4	(Germany) B Becker	7^{7}	6
Q	(Germany) R Becker	6^{4}	3
(Russia) K Kravchuk	7	2	3
(Germany) M Berrer	5	6	6
(Germany) M Bachinger	6	3	7^{9}
SE	(Germany) T Puertz	3	6	6^{7}
Q	(Spain) A Artuñedo	5	6^{4}
5	(Russia) T Gabashvili	7	7^{7}

Second round
1/WC	(Italy) A Seppi	6	7
WC	(Uzbekistan) F Dustov	4	5
(Czech Republic) J Mertl	2	4
8	(Canada) F Dancevic	6	6
4	(Germany) B Becker	6	4	6
(Germany) M Berrer	4	6	4
(Germany) M Bachinger	6	3	2
5	(Russia) T Gabashvili	3	6	6

Quarterfinals
1/WC	(Italy) A Seppi	6	6
8	(Canada) F Dancevic	3	3
4	(Germany) B Becker	4	1
5	(Russia) T Gabashvili	6	6

Semifinals
1/WC	(Italy) A Seppi	7^{10}	6^{6}	6
5	(Russia) T Gabashvili	6^{8}	7^{8}	3

=== Bottom half ===
First round
7	(Italy) M Viola	2	5
(Switzerland) M Chiudinelli	6	7
Q	(Croatia) N Mektic	7^{7}	6
Q	(Switzerland) A Ritschard	6^{3}	4
LL	(Italy) M Trevisan	4	6	6
(Germany) P Gojowczyk	6	3	2
(Germany) S Greul	7^{7}	6
3	(Israel) D Sela	6^{2}	2
6	(Netherlands) J Huta Galung	6	6
(Czech Republic) J Pospíšil	1	3
(Italy) M Cecchinato	5	2
(Germany) D Brown	7	6
(Austria) M Fischer	3	6	6
WC	(Italy) Patrick Prader	6	4	4
(France) P-H Herbert	7^{7}	7^{9}
2	(Poland) M Przysiężny	6^{3}	6^{7}

Second round
(Switzerland) M Chiudinelli	6	3	3
Q	(Croatia) N Mektic	2	6	6
LL	(Italy) M Trevisan	6	4	4
(Germany) S Greul	4	6	6
6	(Netherlands) J Huta Galung	7^{7}	5	4
(Germany) D Brown	6^{2}	7	6
(Austria) M Fischer	6^{1}	0
(France) P-H Herbert	7^{7}	6

Quarterfinals
Q	(Croatia) N Mektic	4	2
(Germany) S Greul	6	6
(Germany) D Brown	6	6
(France) P-H Herbert	4	3

Semifinals
(Germany) S Greul	6	7
(Germany) D Brown	4	5
