= 2012 Internazionali Tennis Val Gardena Südtirol =

- Date: 5–11 November
- Edition: 3rd
- Surface: Carpet
- Location: Ortisei, Italy

Champions

Singles
- (Germany) Benjamin Becker

Doubles
- (Slovakia) Karol Beck / (South Africa) Rik de Voest
← 2011 ·	Internazionali Tennis Val Gardena Südtirol	· 2013 →

The 2012 Internazionali Tennis Val Gardena Südtirol was a professional tennis tournament played in Ortisei, Italy between 5 and 11 November 2012 on carpet courts. It was the third edition of the tournament which was part of the 2012 ATP Challenger Tour.

== Singles main-draw entrants ==
=== Seeds ===
Country	Player	Rank^{1}	Seed
ITA	Andreas Seppi	22	1
GER	Benjamin Becker	79	2
ITA	Simone Bolelli	84	3
USA	Rajeev Ram	94	4
GER	Philipp Petzschner	104	5
FRA	Édouard Roger-Vasselin	107	6
CAN	Vasek Pospisil	109	7
BEL	Ruben Bemelmans	112	8

- ^{1} Rankings are as of October 29, 2012.

=== Other entrants ===
The following players received wildcards into the singles main draw:

- (Italy) Simone Bolelli
- (Lithuania) Laurynas Grigelis
- (Italy) Patrick Prader
- (Italy) Andreas Seppi

The following players received entry from the qualifying draw:

- (Croatia) Marin Draganja
- (Switzerland) Sandro Ehrat
- (France) Pierre-Hugues Herbert
- (Italy) Alessandro Petrone

== Champions ==
=== Singles ===
- (Germany) Benjamin Becker def. (Italy) Andreas Seppi, 6–1, 6–4

=== Doubles ===
- (Slovakia) Karol Beck / (South Africa) Rik de Voest def. (Australia) Rameez Junaid / (Germany) Michael Kohlmann, 6–3, 6–4
