= 2013 Sparkasse ATP Challenger =

- Date: 4–10 November
- Edition: 4th
- Surface: Hard, Indoors
- Location: Ortisei, Italy

Champions

Singles
- (Italy) Andreas Seppi

Doubles
- (Germany) Christopher Kas / (Germany) Tim Puetz
← 2012 ·	Sparkasse ATP Challenger	· 2014 →

The 2013 Sparkasse ATP Challenger was a professional tennis tournament played in Ortisei, Italy between 4 and 10 November 2013 on indoor hard courts. It was the fourth edition of the tournament which was part of the 2013 ATP Challenger Tour.

== Singles main-draw entrants ==
=== Seeds ===
Country	Player	Rank^{1}	Seed
ITA	Andreas Seppi	25	1
POL	Michał Przysiężny	65	2
ISR	Dudi Sela	70	3
GER	Benjamin Becker	73	4
RUS	Teymuraz Gabashvili	95	5
NED	Jesse Huta Galung	102	6
ITA	Matteo Viola	125	7
CAN	Frank Dancevic	132	8

- ^{1} Rankings are as of October 28, 2013.

=== Other entrants ===
The following players received wildcards into the singles main draw:

- (Italy) Matteo Donati
- (Uzbekistan) Farrukh Dustov
- (Italy) Patrick Prader
- (Italy) Andreas Seppi

The following players received special exempt into the singles main draw:

- (Germany) Tim Puetz

The following players received entry from the qualifying draw:

- (Germany) Richard Becker
- (Spain) Andrés Artuñedo
- (Croatia) Nikola Mektić
- (Switzerland) Alexander Ritschard

== Champions ==
=== Singles ===
- (Italy) Andreas Seppi def. (Germany) Simon Greul 7–6^{(7–4)}, 6–2

=== Doubles ===
- (Germany) Christopher Kas / (Germany) Tim Puetz def. (Germany) Benjamin Becker / (Italy) Daniele Bracciali 6–2, 7–5
