= 2015 PBZ Zagreb Indoors – Doubles =

Doubles
- 2015 PBZ Zagreb Indoors

Final
- Champions: (Croatia) Marin Draganja (Finland) Henri Kontinen
- Runners-up: (France) Fabrice Martin (India) Purav Raja
- Score: 6–4, 6–4

Events
Singles	Doubles
← 2014 ·	PBZ Zagreb Indoors

Jean-Julien Rojer and Horia Tecău were the defending champions, but chose not to participate this year.
Marin Draganja and Henri Kontinen won the title, defeating Fabrice Martin and Purav Raja in the final, 6–4, 6–4.

== Seeds ==
1. (Sweden) Robert Lindstedt / (Poland) Marcin Matkowski (quarterfinals)
2. (Croatia) Marin Draganja / (Finland) Henri Kontinen (champions)
3. (Germany) Andre Begemann / (Netherlands) Robin Haase (first round)
4. (Belarus) Sergey Betov / (Belarus) Alexander Bury (semifinals)

== Draw ==
=== Key ===
- Q = Qualifier
- WC = Wild card
- LL = Lucky loser
- Alt = Alternate
- SE = Special exempt
- PR = Protected ranking
- ITF = ITF entry
- JE = Junior exempt
- w/o = Walkover
- r = Retired
- d = Defaulted
- SR = Special ranking

=== Draw ===
First round
1	(Sweden) R Lindstedt (Poland) M Matkowski	6	2	[10]
(Netherlands) J Huta Galung (Germany) D Meffert	3	6	[8]
(France) F Martin (India) P Raja	4	6	[10]
WC	(Croatia) D Marcan (Croatia) A Šančić	6	2	[6]
4	(Belarus) S Betov (Belarus) A Bury	6	3	[10]
(Italy) A Seppi (Russia) M Youzhny	4	6	[2]
(Slovakia) L Lacko (Italy) A Motti	4	4
(Slovenia) B Kavčič (Croatia) F Škugor	6	6
(Germany) M Emmrich (Sweden) A Siljeström	7^{7}	6
(Lithuania) R Berankis (France) A Mannarino	6^{4}	2
(Ukraine) S Stakhovsky (Serbia) V Troicki	6	7^{8}
3	(Germany) A Begemann (Netherlands) R Haase	4	6^{6}
WC	(Croatia) M Delić (Croatia) N Mektić	1	7^{7}	[2]
(Luxembourg) G Müller (Netherlands) I Sijsling	6	6^{5}	[10]
(Croatia) B Ćorić (Croatia) I Dodig	3	4
2	(Croatia) M Draganja (Finland) H Kontinen	6	6

Quarterfinals
1	(Sweden) R Lindstedt (Poland) M Matkowski	3	6	[8]
(France) F Martin (India) P Raja	6	3	[10]
4	(Belarus) S Betov (Belarus) A Bury	7^{7}	6
(Slovenia) B Kavčič (Croatia) F Škugor	6^{2}	3
(Germany) M Emmrich (Sweden) A Siljeström	6	3	[4]
(Ukraine) S Stakhovsky (Serbia) V Troicki	4	6	[10]
(Luxembourg) G Müller (Netherlands) I Sijsling	5	4
2	(Croatia) M Draganja (Finland) H Kontinen	7	6

Semifinals
(France) F Martin (India) P Raja	3	6	[10]
4	(Belarus) S Betov (Belarus) A Bury	6	1	[6]
(Ukraine) S Stakhovsky (Serbia) V Troicki	6^{0}	4
2	(Croatia) M Draganja (Finland) H Kontinen	7^{7}	6

Final
(France) F Martin (India) P Raja	4	4
2	(Croatia) M Draganja (Finland) H Kontinen	6	6
