= 2011 Internazionali Tennis Val Gardena Südtirol =

- Date: 7–13 November
- Edition: 2nd
- Location: Ortisei, Italy

Champions

Singles
- (United States) Rajeev Ram

Doubles
- (Germany) Dustin Brown / (Croatia) Lovro Zovko
← 2010 ·	Internazionali Tennis Val Gardena Südtirol	· 2012 →

The 2011 Internazionali Tennis Val Gardena Südtirol was a professional tennis tournament played in Ortisei, Italy between 7 and 13 November 2011 on carpet courts. It was the second edition of the tournament which is part of the 2011 ATP Challenger Tour.

== ATP entrants ==
=== Seeds ===
Country	Player	Rank^{1}	Seed
GER	Philipp Petzschner	61	1
ISR	Dudi Sela	91	2
ROU	Adrian Ungur	114	3
SVK	Lukáš Lacko	123	4
ITA	Simone Bolelli	126	5
NED	Igor Sijsling	145	6
GER	Dustin Brown	146	7
GER	Daniel Brands	147	8

- ^{1} Rankings are as of October 31, 2011.

=== Other entrants ===
The following players received wildcards into the singles main draw:

- (Italy) Federico Gaio
- (Italy) Claudio Grassi
- (Israel) Dudi Sela
- (Italy) Matteo Trevisan

The following players received entry from the qualifying draw:

- (Russia) Mikhail Elgin
- (Poland) Mateusz Kowalczyk
- (Czech Republic) Michal Schmid
- (Germany) Marcel Zimmermann

== Champions ==
=== Singles ===
(United States) Rajeev Ram def. (Czech Republic) Jan Hernych, 7–5, 3–6, 7–6^{(8–6)}

=== Doubles ===
(Germany) Dustin Brown / (Croatia) Lovro Zovko def. (Germany) Philipp Petzschner / (Germany) Alexander Waske, 6–4, 7–6^{(7–4)}
