= 2010 The Jersey International – Singles =

Singles
- 2010 The Jersey International

Final
- Champion: (Czech Republic) Jan Hernych
- Runner-up: (Czech Republic) Jan Minář
- Score: 7–6(3), 6–4

Events
Singles	Doubles
← 2009 ·	The Jersey International	· 2011 →

Daniel Evans was the defending champion, but he lost to Tobias Kamke in the first round.
Jan Hernych defeated 7–6(3), 6–4 her compatriot Jan Minář in the final.

== Seeds ==
1. (Czech Republic) Jan Hernych (champion)
2. (United Kingdom) Alex Bogdanovic (first round)
3. (France) Nicolas Mahut (first round)
4. (Belarus) Uladzimir Ignatik (second round)
5. (Netherlands) Igor Sijsling (semifinals)
6. (Belgium) Niels Desein (first round)
7. (Croatia) Roko Karanušić (first round)
8. (France) Sébastien de Chaunac (second round)

== Draw ==
=== Key ===
- Q = Qualifier
- WC = Wild card
- LL = Lucky loser
- Alt = Alternate
- SE = Special exempt
- PR = Protected ranking
- ITF = ITF entry
- JE = Junior exempt
- w/o = Walkover
- r = Retired
- d = Defaulted
- SR = Special ranking

=== Finals ===
Semifinals
1	(Czech Republic) Jan Hernych	6	6
(Belgium) Yannick Mertens	4	3
5	(Netherlands) Igor Sijsling	7	4	2
(Czech Republic) Jan Minář	5	6	6

Final
1	(Czech Republic) Jan Hernych	7	6
(Czech Republic) Jan Minář	6^{3}	4

=== Top half ===
First round
1	(Czech Republic) J Hernych	6	4	6
(Austria) M Fischer	3	6	4
Q	(Switzerland) R Valent	4	5
(Germany) S Stadler	6	7
WC	(United Kingdom) J Goodall	6^{5}	6	3
(Austria) P Oswald	7	3	6
WC	(United Kingdom) D Inglot	6	6
7	(Croatia) R Karanušić	3	4
3	(France) N Mahut	4	6	4
(France) A Mannarino	6	0	6
(New Zealand) D King-Turner	3	3
(Belgium) Y Mertens	6	6
WC	(United Kingdom) D Smethurst	6	6^{6}	6
(Spain) A Menéndez-Maceiras	3	7	1
(Republic of Ireland) C Niland	6	6
6	(Belgium) N Desein	1	4

Second round
1	(Czech Republic) J Hernych	6	7
(Germany) S Stadler	3	6^{3}
(Austria) P Oswald	2	7	7
WC	(United Kingdom) D Inglot	6	6^{2}	6^{5}
(France) A Mannarino	5	3
(Belgium) Y Mertens	7	6
WC	(United Kingdom) D Smethurst	2	1
(Republic of Ireland) C Niland	6	6

Quarterfinals
1	(Czech Republic) J Hernych	6	6
(Austria) P Oswald	1	4
(Belgium) Y Mertens	6	6
(Republic of Ireland) C Niland	4	4

Semifinals
1	(Czech Republic) J Hernych	6	6
(Belgium) Y Mertens	4	3

=== Bottom half ===
First round
5	(Netherlands) I Sijsling	6	6
ALT	(Luxembourg) G Müller	4	4
(Germany) T Kamke	6	6
(United Kingdom) D Evans	2	2
(United Kingdom) J Ward	6	4	5
(Ukraine) S Bubka	4	6	7
WC	(United Kingdom) A Ward	6^{5}	6^{4}
4	(Belarus) U Ignatik	7	7
8	(France) S de Chaunac	7	6
Q	(United Kingdom) J Milton	6^{3}	4
(Spain) R Bautista-Agut	7	7
Q	(Lithuania) L Grigelis	5	6^{7}
(Czech Republic) J Minář	6	6
Q	(Denmark) F Nielsen	4	3
(United States) R DeHeart	2	6	6
2	(United Kingdom) A Bogdanovic	6	3	2

Second round
5	(Netherlands) I Sijsling	7	6
(Germany) T Kamke	6^{5}	3
(Ukraine) S Bubka	6	3	7
4	(Belarus) U Ignatik	4	6	6^{3}
8	(France) S de Chaunac	3	4
(Spain) R Bautista-Agut	6	6
(Czech Republic) J Minář	6	6
(United States) R DeHeart	1	3

Quarterfinals
5	(Netherlands) I Sijsling	7	7
(Ukraine) S Bubka	5	5
(Spain) R Bautista-Agut	5	1
(Czech Republic) J Minář	7	6

Semifinals
5	(Netherlands) I Sijsling	7	4	2
(Czech Republic) J Minář	5	6	6
