= 2013 Sparkasse ATP Challenger – Doubles =

Doubles
- 2013 Sparkasse ATP Challenger

Final
- Champion: (Germany) Christopher Kas (Germany) Tim Pütz
- Runner-up: (Germany) Benjamin Becker (Italy) Daniele Bracciali
- Score: 6–2, 7–5

Events
Singles	Doubles
← 2012 ·	Sparkasse ATP Challenger	· 2014 →

Karol Beck and Rik de Voest were the defending champions but they decided not to participate.
German team and fourth seeds Christopher Kas and Tim Pütz won the title over Benjamin Becker and Daniele Bracciali

== Seeds ==
1. (India) Purav Raja / (India) Divij Sharan (semifinals)
2. (Germany) Dustin Brown / (Germany) Philipp Marx (first round)
3. (United States) James Cerretani / (Canada) Adil Shamasdin (first round)
4. (Germany) Christopher Kas / (Germany) Tim Pütz (champion)

== Draw ==
=== Key ===
- Q = Qualifier
- WC = Wild card
- LL = Lucky loser
- Alt = Alternate
- SE = Special exempt
- PR = Protected ranking
- ITF = ITF entry
- JE = Junior exempt
- w/o = Walkover
- r = Retired
- d = Defaulted
- SR = Special ranking

=== Draw ===
First round
1	(India) P Raja (India) D Sharan	6	6
WC	(Italy) David Kostner (Italy) Patric Prinoth	1	3
(Czech Republic) J Mertl (Czech Republic) J Pospíšil	2	2
(Austria) M Fischer (Germany) P Gojowczyk	6	6
4	(Germany) C Kas (Germany) T Pütz	3	6	[10]
(Germany) M Bachinger (Austria) P Oswald	6	3	[9]
(Italy) M Crugnola (Italy) M Viola	w/o
(Netherlands) S Groen (Poland) M Przysiężny
WC	(Uzbekistan) F Dustov (Italy) Patrick Prader	4	6	[8]
(Belgium) R Bemelmans (Netherlands) J Huta Galung	6	2	[10]
(Canada) F Dancevic (Italy) R Ghedin	6^{3}	6	[10]
3	(United States) J Cerretani (Canada) A Shamasdin	7^{7}	4	[8]
(Germany) B Becker (Italy) D Bracciali	6	6
WC	(Italy) Eugenio Candioli (Italy) Joy Vigani	2	1
(Russia) K Kravchuk (Israel) D Sela	6	6^{2}	[10]
2	(Germany) D Brown (Germany) P Marx	4	7^{7}	[6]

Quarterfinals
1	(India) P Raja (India) D Sharan	7^{8}	6
(Austria) M Fischer (Germany) P Gojowczyk	6^{6}	2
4	(Germany) C Kas (Germany) T Pütz	6	6
(Italy) M Crugnola (Italy) M Viola	1	4
(Belgium) R Bemelmans (Netherlands) J Huta Galung	7^{8}	7^{7}
(Canada) F Dancevic (Italy) R Ghedin	6^{6}	6^{4}
(Germany) B Becker (Italy) D Bracciali	6	6
(Russia) K Kravchuk (Israel) D Sela	3	4

Semifinals
1	(India) P Raja (India) D Sharan	6^{3}	2
4	(Germany) C Kas (Germany) T Pütz	7^{7}	6
(Belgium) R Bemelmans (Netherlands) J Huta Galung	2	1
(Germany) B Becker (Italy) D Bracciali	6	6

Final
4	(Germany) C Kas (Germany) T Pütz	6	7
(Germany) B Becker (Italy) D Bracciali	2	5
