= 2015 PBZ Zagreb Indoors =

- Date: 2–8 February
- Edition: 13th
- Category: ATP World Tour 250 series
- Draw: 28S / 16D
- Prize money: €494,310
- Surface: Hard / Indoor
- Location: Zagreb, Croatia
- Venue: Dom Sportova

Champions

Singles
- (Spain) Guillermo García López

Doubles
- (Croatia) Marin Draganja / (Finland) Henri Kontinen
← 2014 ·	PBZ Zagreb Indoors

The 2015 PBZ Zagreb Indoors was an ATP tennis tournament played on hard courts indoors. It was the 13th overall edition of the PBZ Zagreb Indoors, and part of the ATP World Tour 250 series of the 2015 ATP World Tour. It took place in Zagreb, Croatia from February 2 through February 8, 2015.

== Finals ==
=== Singles ===
- (Spain) Guillermo García López defeated (Italy) Andreas Seppi, 7–6^{(7–4)}, 6–3

=== Doubles ===
- (Croatia) Marin Draganja / (Finland) Henri Kontinen defeated (France) Fabrice Martin / (India) Purav Raja, 6–4, 6–4

== Points and prize money ==
=== Point distribution ===
Event	W	F	SF	QF	Round of 16	Round of 32	Q	Q3	Q2	Q1
Singles	250	150	90	45	20	0	12	6	0	0
Doubles	250	150	90	45	0	—	—	—	—	—

=== Prize money ===
Event	W	F	SF	QF	Round of 16	Round of 32	Q3	Q2	Q1
Singles	€80,000	€42,100	€22,800	€12,990	€7,655	€4,535	€730	€350	—
Doubles	€24,280	€12,760	€6,920	€3,960	€2,320	—	—	—	—
Doubles prize money per team

== Singles main-draw entrants ==
=== Seeds ===
Country	Player	Rank^{1}	Seed
CRO	Ivo Karlović	27	1
FRA	Adrian Mannarino	36	2
ESP	Guillermo García López	37	3
LUX	Gilles Müller	42	4
ITA	Andreas Seppi	46	5
RUS	Mikhail Youzhny	49	6
SRB	Viktor Troicki	54	7
ESP	Marcel Granollers	58	8

- Rankings are as of January 19, 2015.

=== Other entrants ===
The following players received wildcards into the singles main draw:

- (Croatia) Toni Androić
- (Croatia) Mate Delić
- (Croatia) Antonio Veić

The following players received entry from the qualifying draw:

- (Germany) Matthias Bachinger
- (Germany) Michael Berrer
- (Canada) Frank Dancevic
- (Ukraine) Illya Marchenko

=== Withdrawals ===
Before the tournament

- (Italy) Simone Bolelli → replaced by (Bosnia and Herzegovina) Damir Džumhur
- (Croatia) Marin Čilić → replaced by (Austria) Jürgen Melzer
- (Canada) Vasek Pospisil → replaced by (Slovenia) Blaž Kavčič
- (Czech Republic) Jiří Veselý → replaced by (United Kingdom) James Ward

== Doubles main-draw entrants ==
=== Seeds ===
Country	Player	Country	Player	Rank^{1}	Seed
SWE	Robert Lindstedt	POL	Marcin Matkowski	41	1
CRO	Marin Draganja	FIN	Henri Kontinen	77	2
GER	Andre Begemann	NED	Robin Haase	86	3
BLR	Sergey Betov	BLR	Aliaksandr Bury	188	4

- Rankings are as of January 19, 2015.

=== Other entrants ===
The following pairs received wildcards into the doubles main draw:

- (Croatia) Mate Delić / (Croatia) Nikola Mektić
- (Croatia) Dino Marcan / (Croatia) Antonio Šančić
