= 2015 PBZ Zagreb Indoors – Singles =

Singles
- 2015 PBZ Zagreb Indoors

Final
- Champion: (Spain) Guillermo García-López
- Runner-up: (Italy) Andreas Seppi
- Score: 7–6^{(7–4)}, 6–3

Events
Singles	Doubles
← 2014 ·	PBZ Zagreb Indoors

Marin Čilić was the two-time defending champion, but withdrew before the tournament started due to an arm injury.

Guillermo García-López won the title, defeating Andreas Seppi in the final, 7–6^{(7–4)}, 6–3.

== Seeds ==
1. (Croatia) Ivo Karlović (second round)
2. (France) Adrian Mannarino (second round)
3. (Spain) Guillermo García-López (champion)
4. (Luxembourg) Gilles Müller (second round)
5. (Italy) Andreas Seppi (final)
6. (Russia) Mikhail Youzhny (quarterfinals)
7. (Serbia) Viktor Troicki (quarterfinals)
8. (Spain) Marcel Granollers (semifinals)

== Draw ==
=== Key ===
- Q = Qualifier
- WC = Wild card
- LL = Lucky loser
- Alt = Alternate
- SE = Special exempt
- PR = Protected ranking
- ITF = ITF entry
- JE = Junior exempt
- w/o = Walkover
- r = Retired
- d = Defaulted
- SR = Special ranking

=== Finals ===
Semifinals
(Cyprus) Marcos Baghdatis	4	4
3	(Spain) Guillermo García-López	6	6
5	(Italy) Andreas Seppi	7^{7}	6
8	(Spain) Marcel Granollers	6^{5}	1

Final
3	(Spain) Guillermo García-López	7^{7}	6
5	(Italy) Andreas Seppi	6^{4}	3

=== Top half ===
First round
WC	(Croatia) T Androić	7^{7}	2	3
(Cyprus) M Baghdatis	6^{3}	6	6
(Croatia) B Ćorić	2	4
(Ukraine) S Stakhovsky	6	6
(Slovenia) B Kavčič	3	6	4
6	(Russia) M Youzhny	6	1	6
(Bosnia and Herzegovina) D Džumhur	6	0	7
Q	(Germany) M Berrer	2	6	5
(Japan) G Soeda	7^{7}	7
Q	(Germany) M Bachinger	6^{4}	5
Q	(Ukraine) I Marchenko	6	6^{3}	6^{3}
7	(Serbia) V Troicki	4	7^{7}	7^{7}

Second round
1	(Croatia) I Karlović	6	6^{5}	6^{7}
(Cyprus) M Baghdatis	3	7^{7}	7^{9}
(Ukraine) S Stakhovsky	2	1
6	(Russia) M Youzhny	6	6
3	(Spain) G García-López	6	6
(Bosnia and Herzegovina) D Džumhur	1	1
(Japan) G Soeda	3	1
7	(Serbia) V Troicki	6	6

Quarterfinals
(Cyprus) M Baghdatis	3	6	6
6	(Russia) M Youzhny	6	3	4
3	(Spain) G García-López	6	6^{5}	7
7	(Serbia) V Troicki	1	7^{7}	5

Semifinals
(Cyprus) M Baghdatis	4	4
3	(Spain) G García-López	6	6

=== Bottom half ===
First round
5	(Italy) A Seppi	6	3	6
(Netherlands) R Haase	2	6	4
WC	(Croatia) A Veić	2	4
(United Kingdom) J Ward	6	6
(Lithuania) R Berankis	6	6
(Slovakia) L Lacko	0	2
8	(Spain) M Granollers	6	7^{7}
(Austria) J Melzer	2	6^{3}
WC	(Croatia) M Delić	2	3
(Croatia) I Dodig	6	6
(Netherlands) I Sijsling	6	7
Q	(Canada) F Dancevic	4	5

Second round
5	(Italy) A Seppi	7	6^{4}	6
(United Kingdom) J Ward	5	7^{7}	3
(Lithuania) R Berankis	3	7^{7}	6
4	(Luxembourg) G Müller	6	6^{5}	4
8	(Spain) M Granollers	7^{10}	4	6
(Croatia) I Dodig	6^{8}	6	3
(Netherlands) I Sijsling	7^{7}	4	6
2	(France) A Mannarino	6^{3}	6	1

Quarterfinals
5	(Italy) A Seppi	3	6	7^{8}
(Lithuania) R Berankis	6	2	6^{6}
8	(Spain) M Granollers	6	2	6
(Netherlands) I Sijsling	4	6	4

Semifinals
5	(Italy) A Seppi	7^{7}	6
8	(Spain) M Granollers	6^{5}	1

== Qualifying ==
=== Seeds ===
1. (Slovenia) Aljaž Bedene (second round)
2. (Uzbekistan) Farrukh Dustov (second round)
3. (Germany) Michael Berrer (qualified)
4. (Slovakia) Norbert Gombos (qualifying competition)
5. (Germany) Matthias Bachinger (qualified)
6. (Ukraine) Illya Marchenko (qualified)
7. (Canada) Frank Dancevic (qualified)
8. (Belgium) Kimmer Coppejans (first round)

=== Qualifiers ===
1. (Germany) Matthias Bachinger
2. (Ukraine) Illya Marchenko
3. (Germany) Michael Berrer
4. (Canada) Frank Dancevic

=== Qualifying draw ===
==== First qualifier ====
First round
1	(Slovenia) Aljaž Bedene	6	6
WC	(Slovenia) Grega Žemlja	3	3
WC	(Croatia) Domagoj Bilješko	2	4
(Belarus) Uladzimir Ignatik	6	6
WC	(Croatia) Antonio Šančić	6^{1}	4
(Bosnia and Herzegovina) Mirza Bašić	7^{7}	6
(Italy) Federico Gaio	4	6^{4}
5	(Germany) Matthias Bachinger	6	7^{7}

Second round
1	(Slovenia) Aljaž Bedene	3	4
(Belarus) Uladzimir Ignatik	6	6
(Bosnia and Herzegovina) Mirza Bašić	7^{7}	4	6^{4}
5	(Germany) Matthias Bachinger	6^{5}	6	7^{7}

Qualifying competition
(Belarus) Uladzimir Ignatik	3	6^{3}
5	(Germany) Matthias Bachinger	6	7^{7}

==== Second qualifier ====
First round
2	(Uzbekistan) Farrukh Dustov	1	7^{7}	6
(Croatia) Nikola Mektić	6	6^{5}	1
(Germany) Daniel Brands	6^{4}	6	6^{3}
(Romania) Marius Copil	7^{7}	3	7^{7}
(Croatia) Filip Veger	4	6	4
(Belarus) Egor Gerasimov	6	3	6
(Serbia) Miki Janković	1	6^{4}
6	(Ukraine) Illya Marchenko	6	7^{7}

Second round
2	(Uzbekistan) Farrukh Dustov	7^{7}	4	6^{5}
(Romania) Marius Copil	6^{3}	6	7^{7}
(Belarus) Egor Gerasimov	2	3
6	(Ukraine) Illya Marchenko	6	6

Qualifying competition
(Romania) Marius Copil	4	7^{7}	6^{5}
6	(Ukraine) Illya Marchenko	6	6^{2}	7^{7}

==== Third qualifier ====
First round
3	(Germany) Michael Berrer	6	6
WC	(Croatia) Franko Škugor	3	4
(Netherlands) Jesse Huta Galung	6	6
(Russia) Kirill Dmitriev	4	2
(Serbia) Ilija Bozoljac	6	6^{5}	6
(Czech Republic) Jan Mertl	4	7^{7}	3
(Bosnia and Herzegovina) Aldin Šetkić	7^{9}	4	7^{10}
8	(Belgium) Kimmer Coppejans	6^{7}	6	6^{8}

Second round
3	(Germany) Michael Berrer	6	6
(Netherlands) Jesse Huta Galung	4	3
(Serbia) Ilija Bozoljac	4	4
(Bosnia and Herzegovina) Aldin Šetkić	6	6

Qualifying competition
3	(Germany) Michael Berrer	6	7^{7}
(Bosnia and Herzegovina) Aldin Šetkić	4	6^{4}

==== Fourth qualifier ====
First round
4	(Slovakia) Norbert Gombos	6	6
(Croatia) Dino Marcan	1	2
(Bosnia and Herzegovina) Tomislav Brkić	6^{6}	3
(Italy) Stefano Napolitano	7^{8}	6
(Austria) Martin Fischer	7^{10}	6
(Croatia) Duje Kekez	6^{8}	3
(Russia) Aslan Karatsev	2	4
7	(Canada) Frank Dancevic	6	6

Second round
4	(Slovakia) Norbert Gombos	6	6^{4}	6
(Italy) Stefano Napolitano	1	7^{7}	3
(Austria) Martin Fischer	2	2
7	(Canada) Frank Dancevic	6	6

Qualifying competition
4	(Slovakia) Norbert Gombos	7	4	5
7	(Canada) Frank Dancevic	5	6	7
