= 2010 The Jersey International =

- Date: March 22 – March 28
- Edition: 3rd
- Location: Jersey, Channel Islands

Champions

Singles
- (Czech Republic) Jan Hernych

Doubles
- (India) Rohan Bopanna / (United Kingdom) Ken Skupski
- The Jersey International

The 2010 The Jersey International was a professional tennis tournament played on indoor hard courts. It was part of the 2010 ATP Challenger Tour. It took place in Jersey, Channel Islands between 22 and 28 March 2010.

== ATP entrants ==
=== Seeds ===
Nationality	Player	Ranking*	Seeding
CZE	Jan Hernych	147	1
GBR	Alex Bogdanovic	155	2
FRA	Nicolas Mahut	163	3
BLR	Uladzimir Ignatik	183	4
NED	Igor Sijsling	186	5
BEL	Niels Desein	187	6
CRO	Roko Karanušić	193	7
FRA	Sébastien de Chaunac	199	8

- Rankings are as of March 8, 2010.

=== Other entrants ===
The following players received wildcards into the singles main draw:

- (United Kingdom) Joshua Goodall
- (United Kingdom) Dominic Inglot
- (United Kingdom) Daniel Smethurst
- (United Kingdom) Alexander Ward

The following players received entry from the qualifying draw:

- (Lithuania) Laurynas Grigelis
- (United Kingdom) Joshua Milton
- (Denmark) Frederik Nielsen
- (Switzerland) Roman Valent

== Champions ==
=== Singles ===
(Czech Republic) Jan Hernych def. (Czech Republic) Jan Minář, 7–6(3), 6–4

=== Doubles ===
(India) Rohan Bopanna / (United Kingdom) Ken Skupski def. (United Kingdom) Jonathan Marray / (United Kingdom) Jamie Murray, 6–2, 2–6, [10–6]
