= 2010 Internazionali Tennis Val Gardena Südtirol =

- Date: 8–14 November
- Edition: 1st
- Location: Ortisei, Italy

Champions

Singles
- (Poland) Michał Przysiężny

Doubles
- (Russia) Mikhail Elgin / (Russia) Alexander Kudryavtsev
Internazionali Tennis Val Gardena Südtirol	· 2011 →

The 2010 Internazionali Tennis Val Gardena Südtirol was a professional tennis tournament played on carpet in Ortisei, Italy between 8 and 14 November 2010. It was the first edition of the tournament which is part of the 2010 ATP Challenger Tour.

== ATP entrants ==
=== Seeds ===
Country	Player	Rank^{1}	Seed
POL	Michał Przysiężny	100	1
SVK	Karol Beck	104	2
ITA	Simone Bolelli	114	3
CRO	Ivan Dodig	118	4
AUT	Martin Fischer	124	5
RUS	Igor Kunitsyn	129	6
RUS	Konstantin Kravchuk	130	7
CZE	Jaroslav Pospíšil	140	8

- Rankings are as of November 1, 2010.

=== Other entrants ===
The following players received wildcards into the singles main draw:

- (Italy) Daniele Bracciali
- (Uzbekistan) Farrukh Dustov
- (Italy) Claudio Grassi
- (Poland) Michał Przysiężny

The following players received entry from the qualifying draw:

- (Romania) Marius Copil
- (Slovakia) Lukáš Lacko
- (Czech Republic) Jan Mertl
- (Czech Republic) Michal Schmid

== Champions ==
=== Singles ===
(Poland) Michał Przysiężny def. (Slovakia) Lukáš Lacko, 6–3, 7–5

=== Doubles ===
(Russia) Mikhail Elgin / (Russia) Alexander Kudryavtsev def. (Poland) Tomasz Bednarek / (Poland) Michał Przysiężny, 3–6, 6–3, [10–3]
