= 2010 Internazionali Tennis Val Gardena Südtirol – Doubles =

Doubles
- 2010 Internazionali Tennis Val Gardena Südtirol

Final
- Champions: (Russia) Michail Elgin (Russia) Alexandre Kudryavtsev
- Runners-up: (Poland) Tomasz Bednarek (Poland) Michał Przysiężny
- Score: 3–6, 6–3, [10–3]

Events
Singles	Doubles
Internazionali Tennis Val Gardena Südtirol	· 2011 →

Michail Elgin and Alexandre Kudryavtsev won the final against Tomasz Bednarek and Michał Przysiężny 3–6, 6–3, [10–3].

== Seeds ==
1. (Italy) Daniele Bracciali / (United Kingdom) Colin Fleming (first round)
2. (Canada) Adil Shamasdin / (Croatia) Lovro Zovko (quarterfinals)
3. (Slovakia) Karol Beck / (Slovakia) Igor Zelenay (quarterfinals)
4. (United States) Brian Battistone / (Sweden) Andreas Siljeström (first round)

== Draw ==
=== Key ===
- Q = Qualifier
- WC = Wild card
- LL = Lucky loser
- Alt = Alternate
- ITF = ITF entry
- PR = Protected ranking
- SR = Special ranking
- SE = Special exempt
- JE = Junior exempt
- JR = Junior Accelerator Programme entrant
- CO = College Accelerator Programme entrant
- NG = Next Gen Accelerator Program entrant
- w/o = Walkover
- r = Retired
- d = Defaulted

=== Draw ===
First round
1	(Italy) D Bracciali (United Kingdom) C Fleming	6^{2}	3
WC	(Uzbekistan) F Dustov (Italy) A Motti	7	6
WC	(Italy) R Ghedin (Italy) C Grassi	4	6^{8}
(Poland) T Bednarek (Poland) M Przysiężny	6	7
3	(Slovakia) K Beck (Slovakia) I Zelenay	6	3	[11]
(Belarus) U Ignatik (Austria) N Moser	4	6	[9]
(Austria) M Fischer (Austria) P Oswald	6	5	[10]
(Slovakia) D Hrbatý (Czech Republic) J Pospíšil	3	7	[6]
(Austria) S Koubek (Austria) A Peya	3	6	[10]
(Italy) M Crugnola (Romania) A Ungur	6	0	[2]
(South Africa) J Coetzee (Poland) M Kowalczyk	6	3	[10]
4	(United States) B Battistone (Sweden) A Siljeström	3	6	[6]
(Russia) M Elgin (Russia) A Kudryavtsev	6	6
WC	(Italy) P Lageder (Honduras) J Moncada	1	3
(Croatia) N Mektić (Croatia) I Zovko	4	3
2	(Canada) A Shamasdin (Croatia) L Zovko	6	6

Quarterfinals
WC	(Uzbekistan) F Dustov (Italy) A Motti	0	2
(Poland) T Bednarek (Poland) M Przysiężny	6	6
3	(Slovakia) K Beck (Slovakia) I Zelenay	1	6	[7]
(Austria) M Fischer (Austria) P Oswald	6	3	[10]
(Austria) S Koubek (Austria) A Peya	6	7
(South Africa) J Coetzee (Poland) M Kowalczyk	2	5
(Russia) M Elgin (Russia) A Kudryavtsev	7	6
2	(Canada) A Shamasdin (Croatia) L Zovko	6^{5}	4

Semifinals
(Poland) T Bednarek (Poland) M Przysiężny	6	2	[10]
(Austria) M Fischer (Austria) P Oswald	4	6	[8]
(Austria) S Koubek (Austria) A Peya	7	3	[5]
(Russia) M Elgin (Russia) A Kudryavtsev	6^{3}	6	[10]

Final
(Poland) T Bednarek (Poland) M Przysiężny	6	3	[3]
(Russia) M Elgin (Russia) A Kudryavtsev	3	6	[10]
