= 2012 Internazionali Tennis Val Gardena Südtirol – Doubles =

Doubles
- 2012 Internazionali Tennis Val Gardena Südtirol

Final
- Champion: (Slovakia) Karol Beck (South Africa) Rik de Voest
- Runner-up: (Australia) Rameez Junaid (Germany) Michael Kohlmann
- Score: 6–3, 6–4

Events
Singles	Doubles
← 2011 ·	Internazionali Tennis Val Gardena Südtirol	· 2013 →

Dustin Brown and Lovro Zovko were the defending champions but they decided not to participate together this year.
Brown plays alongside Christopher Kas, while Zovko partners up with Marin Draganja, but both pairs lost in the first round.
Karol Beck and Rik de Voest won the title, defeating Rameez Junaid and Michael Kohlmann 6–3, 6–4 in the final.

== Seeds ==
1. (Germany) Dustin Brown / (Germany) Christopher Kas (first round)
2. (Germany) Benjamin Becker / (Germany) Philipp Petzschner (semifinals)
3. (Australia) Rameez Junaid / (Germany) Michael Kohlmann (final)
4. (Croatia) Marin Draganja / (Croatia) Lovro Zovko (first round)

== Draw ==
=== Key ===
- Q = Qualifier
- WC = Wild card
- LL = Lucky loser
- Alt = Alternate
- SE = Special exempt
- PR = Protected ranking
- ITF = ITF entry
- JE = Junior exempt
- w/o = Walkover
- r = Retired
- d = Defaulted
- SR = Special ranking

=== Draw ===
First round
1	(Germany) D Brown (Germany) C Kas	4	6^{5}
(Australia) C Ebelthite (Czech Republic) J Pospíšil	6	7^{7}
(Italy) A Giannessi (Italy) M Viola	4	2
WC	(Italy) Thomas Holzer (Italy) Patrick Prader	6	6
3	(Australia) R Junaid (Germany) M Kohlmann	6	6
(Czech Republic) J Mertl (Czech Republic) I Minář	1	2
(France) P-H Herbert (France) A Olivetti	6	6
WC	(Italy) Philip Lageder (Germany) D Meffert	2	2
(Italy) Andrea Arnaboldi (Lithuania) L Grigelis	6	6
(Uzbekistan) F Dustov (Italy) Matteo Volante	3	4
(Slovakia) K Beck (South Africa) R de Voest	6	6
4	(Croatia) M Draganja (Croatia) L Zovko	1	3
(Moldova) R Albot (Ukraine) O Nedovyesov	3	1
(Russia) D Matsukevich (Chinese Taipei) J Wang	6	6
WC	(Italy) Simon Berger (Italy) Patric Prinoth	3	3
2	(Germany) B Becker (Germany) P Petzschner	6	6

Quarterfinals
(Australia) C Ebelthite (Czech Republic) J Pospíšil	2	6^{10}
WC	(Italy) T Holzer (Italy) P Prader	6	7^{12}
3	(Australia) R Junaid (Germany) M Kohlmann	6^{4}	6	[10]
(France) P-H Herbert (France) A Olivetti	7^{7}	3	[8]
(Italy) A Arnaboldi (Lithuania) L Grigelis	5	7	[8]
(Slovakia) K Beck (South Africa) R de Voest	7	5	[10]
(Russia) D Matsukevich (Chinese Taipei) J Wang	4	2
2	(Germany) B Becker (Germany) P Petzschner	6	6

Semifinals
WC	(Italy) T Holzer (Italy) P Prader	1	3
3	(Australia) R Junaid (Germany) M Kohlmann	6	6
(Slovakia) K Beck (South Africa) R de Voest	6	6
2	(Germany) B Becker (Germany) P Petzschner	3	1

Final
3	(Australia) R Junaid (Germany) M Kohlmann	3	4
(Slovakia) K Beck (South Africa) R de Voest	6	6
