= 2009 The Caversham International =

- Date: March 23 – March 29
- Edition: 2nd
- Location: Jersey, Channel Islands

Champions

Singles
- (United Kingdom) Daniel Evans

Doubles
- (United States) Eric Butorac / (United States) Travis Rettenmaier
← 2008 ·	The Caversham International	· 2010 →

The 2009 The Caversham International was a professional tennis tournament played on outdoor hard courts. It was part of the 2009 ATP Challenger Tour. It took place in Jersey, Channel Islands between 23 and 29 March 2009.

== Singles entrants ==
=== Seeds ===
Nationality	Player	Ranking*	Seeding
FRA	Adrian Mannarino	128	1
GER	Simon Stadler	142	2
GBR	Alex Bogdanovic	195	3
FRA	Sébastien de Chaunac	198	4
AUT	Martin Fischer	200	5
ITA	Andrea Stoppini	209	6
AUS	Robert Smeets	233	7
USA	Michael Yani	238	8

- Rankings are as of March 16, 2009.

=== Other entrants ===
The following players received wildcards into the singles main draw:

- (United Kingdom) Daniel Cox
- (United Kingdom) Daniel Evans
- (United Kingdom) Colin Fleming
- (United Kingdom) Joshua Milton

The following players received entry from the qualifying draw:

- (France) Jean-Noel Insausti
- (United Kingdom) Jonathan Marray
- (Netherlands) Igor Sijsling
- (United States) Phillip Simmonds

== Champions ==
=== Men's singles ===
(United Kingdom) Daniel Evans def. (Czech Republic) Jan Minář, 6–3, 6–2

=== Men's doubles ===
(United States) Eric Butorac / (United States) Travis Rettenmaier def. (United Kingdom) Colin Fleming / (United Kingdom) Ken Skupski, 6–4, 6–3
