= 2012 Internazionali Tennis Val Gardena Südtirol – Singles =

Singles
- 2012 Internazionali Tennis Val Gardena Südtirol

Final
- Champion: (Germany) Benjamin Becker
- Runner-up: (Italy) Andreas Seppi
- Score: 6–1, 6–4

Events
Singles	Doubles
- Internazionali Tennis Val Gardena Südtirol

Rajeev Ram was the defending champion, but he lost in the first round to Dominik Meffert.
Benjamin Becker won the title, defeating Andreas Seppi 6–1, 6–4 in the final.

== Seeds ==
1. (Italy) Andreas Seppi (final)
2. (Germany) Benjamin Becker (champion)
3. (Italy) Simone Bolelli (quarterfinals)
4. (United States) Rajeev Ram (first round)
5. (Germany) Philipp Petzschner (first round)
6. (France) Édouard Roger-Vasselin (semifinals)
7. (Canada) Vasek Pospisil (first round)
8. (Belgium) Ruben Bemelmans (quarterfinals)

== Draw ==
Key

- Q = Qualifier
- WC = Wild card
- LL = Lucky loser
- Alt = Alternate
- ITF = ITF entry
- PR = Protected ranking
- SR = Special ranking
- SE = Special exempt
- JE = Junior exempt
- JR = Junior Accelerator Programme entrant
- CO = College Accelerator Programme entrant
- NG = Next Gen Accelerator Program entrant
- w/o = Walkover
- r = Retired
- d = Defaulted

=== Finals ===
Semifinals
1/WC	(Italy) Andreas Seppi	6	6
6	(France) Édouard Roger-Vasselin	4	3
(Italy) Matteo Viola	5	5
2	(Germany) Benjamin Becker	7	7

Final
1/WC	(Italy) Andreas Seppi	1	4
2	(Germany) Benjamin Becker	6	6

=== Top half ===
First round
1/WC	(Italy) A Seppi	6	6
(Croatia) N Mektić	4	1
(Russia) K Kravchuk	6^{5}	3
(Czech Republic) J Mertl	7^{7}	6
(France) A Olivetti	7^{7}	6
WC	(Lithuania) L Grigelis	6^{4}	2
Q	(France) P-H Herbert	6^{3}	7^{7}	6
5	(Germany) P Petzschner	7^{7}	6^{5}	4
3/WC	(Italy) S Bolelli	6^{7}	6	6
(South Africa) R de Voest	7^{9}	1	4
(France) J Ouanna	6	6
(Moldova) R Albot	3	1
(Germany) D Brown	3	4
(Uzbekistan) F Dustov	6	6
WC	(Italy) Patrick Prader	3	2
6	(France) É Roger-Vasselin	6	6

Second round
1/WC	(Italy) A Seppi	6	6
(Czech Republic) J Mertl	4	3
(France) A Olivetti	4	6^{5}
Q	(France) P-H Herbert	6	7^{7}
3/WC	(Italy) S Bolelli	7	7
(France) J Ouanna	5	5
(Uzbekistan) F Dustov	6^{4}	4
6	(France) É Roger-Vasselin	7^{7}	6

Quarterfinals
1/WC	(Italy) A Seppi	7^{7}	6
Q	(France) P-H Herbert	6^{4}	1
3/WC	(Italy) S Bolelli	4	6^{6}
6	(France) É Roger-Vasselin	6	7^{8}

Semifinals
1/WC	(Italy) A Seppi	6	6
6	(France) É Roger-Vasselin	4	3

=== Bottom half ===
First round
7	(Canada) V Pospisil	3	2
(Chinese Taipei) J Wang	6	6
(Slovakia) K Beck	7^{7}	7^{7}
(Czech Republic) I Minář	6^{2}	6^{3}
(Italy) M Viola	4	6	6
(Italy) A Giannessi	6	1	3
(Germany) D Meffert	7^{7}	6
4	(United States) R Ram	6^{3}	3
8	(Belgium) R Bemelmans	6	6
Q	(Italy) Alessandro Petrone	4	2
Q	(Switzerland) S Ehrat	7^{7}	3	4
(Czech Republic) J Hernych	6^{2}	6	6
Q	(Croatia) M Draganja	6^{6}	3
(Ukraine) O Nedovyesov	7^{8}	6
(Germany) D Brands	3	4
2	(Germany) B Becker	6	6

Second round
(Chinese Taipei) J Wang	6^{3}	3
(Slovakia) K Beck	7^{7}	6
(Italy) M Viola	7^{7}	6^{3}	6
(Germany) D Meffert	6^{3}	7^{7}	4
8	(Belgium) R Bemelmans	7^{7}	3	6
(Czech Republic) J Hernych	6^{5}	6	1
(Ukraine) O Nedovyesov	1	1^{r}
2	(Germany) B Becker	6	1

Quarterfinals
(Slovakia) K Beck	4	6^{4}
(Italy) M Viola	6	7^{7}
8	(Belgium) R Bemelmans	3	6	3
2	(Germany) B Becker	6	2	6

Semifinals
(Italy) M Viola	5	5
2	(Germany) B Becker	7	7
