= 2010 Internazionali Tennis Val Gardena Südtirol – Singles =

Singles
- 2010 Internazionali Tennis Val Gardena Südtirol

Final
- Champion: (Poland) Michał Przysiężny
- Runner-up: (Slovakia) Lukáš Lacko
- Score: 6–3, 7–5

Events
Singles	Doubles
- Internazionali Tennis Val Gardena Südtirol

Michał Przysiężny won the inaugural event by defeating Lukáš Lacko 6–3, 7–5.

== Seeds ==
1. (Poland) Michał Przysiężny (champion)
2. (Slovakia) Karol Beck (quarterfinals)
3. (Italy) Simone Bolelli (semifinals)
4. (Croatia) Ivan Dodig (second round)
5. (Austria) Martin Fischer (quarterfinals)
6. (Russia) Igor Kunitsyn (first round)
7. (Russia) Konstantin Kravchuk (second round)
8. (Czech Republic) Jaroslav Pospíšil (second round)

== Draw ==
Key

- Q = Qualifier
- WC = Wild card
- LL = Lucky loser
- Alt = Alternate
- ITF = ITF entry
- PR = Protected ranking
- SR = Special ranking
- SE = Special exempt
- JE = Junior exempt
- JR = Junior Accelerator Programme entrant
- CO = College Accelerator Programme entrant
- NG = Next Gen Accelerator Program entrant
- w/o = Walkover
- r = Retired
- d = Defaulted

=== Finals ===
Semifinals
1/WC	(Poland) Michał Przysiężny	7	7
(Belarus) Uladzimir Ignatik	6^{6}	6^{4}
3	(Italy) Simone Bolelli	6	6^{5}	4
Q	(Slovakia) Lukáš Lacko	4	7	6

Final
1/WC	(Poland) Michał Przysiężny	6	7
Q	(Slovakia) Lukáš Lacko	3	5

=== Top half ===
First round
1/WC	(Poland) M Przysiężny	6	6
(Italy) D Giorgini	2	2
(Italy) P Lorenzi	1	3
(Croatia) N Mektić	6	6
(Italy) A di Mauro	3	3
WC	(Uzbekistan) F Dustov	6	6
(Italy) R Ghedin	7	2	6^{5}
8	(Czech Republic) J Pospíšil	6^{4}	6	7
4	(Croatia) I Dodig	4	7	7
(Austria) S Koubek	6	6^{4}	6^{1}
(Slovakia) D Hrbatý	6^{2}	3
(Belarus) U Ignatik	7	6
(Ukraine) I Sergeyev	6	6
WC	(Italy) D Bracciali	2	2
Q	(Czech Republic) M Schmid	4	6	2
5	(Austria) M Fischer	6	1	6

Second round
1/WC	(Poland) M Przysiężny	7	6
(Croatia) N Mektić	6^{4}	2
WC	(Uzbekistan) F Dustov	7	7
8	(Czech Republic) J Pospíšil	6^{2}	6^{5}
4	(Croatia) I Dodig	5	6^{2}
(Belarus) U Ignatik	7	7
(Ukraine) I Sergeyev	6^{5}	3
5	(Austria) M Fischer	7	6

Quarterfinals
1/WC	(Poland) M Przysiężny	3	7	6
WC	(Uzbekistan) F Dustov	6	5	3
(Belarus) U Ignatik	7	7
5	(Austria) M Fischer	5	5

Semifinals
1/WC	(Poland) M Przysiężny	7	7
(Belarus) U Ignatik	6^{6}	6^{4}

=== Bottom half ===
First round
6	(Russia) I Kunitsyn	6^{3}	4
(Czech Republic) I Minář	7	6
(Austria) A Peya	6	2	6
Q	(Romania) M Copil	4	6	2
(Italy) A Brizzi	3	4
(Romania) A Ungur	6	6
Q	(Czech Republic) J Mertl	3	4
3	(Italy) S Bolelli	6	6
7	(Russia) K Kravchuk	7	7
WC	(Italy) C Grassi	5	5
(Russia) A Kudryavtsev	6^{5}	2
Q	(Slovakia) L Lacko	7	6
(Italy) M Crugnola	4
(Italy) M Trevisan	1	r
(Italy) M Viola	2	0
2	(Slovakia) K Beck	6	6

Second round
(Czech Republic) I Minář	2	7	3
(Austria) A Peya	6	6^{5}	6
(Romania) A Ungur	3	4
3	(Italy) S Bolelli	6	6
7	(Russia) K Kravchuk	7	4	4
Q	(Slovakia) L Lacko	6^{4}	6	6
(Italy) M Crugnola	1	6^{3}
2	(Slovakia) K Beck	6	7

Quarterfinals
(Austria) A Peya	6^{5}	4
3	(Italy) S Bolelli	7	6
Q	(Slovakia) L Lacko	6	6
2	(Slovakia) K Beck	4	3

Semifinals
3	(Italy) S Bolelli	6	6^{5}	4
Q	(Slovakia) L Lacko	4	7	6
