= ProKennex =

Taiwanese manufacturer of tennis racquets

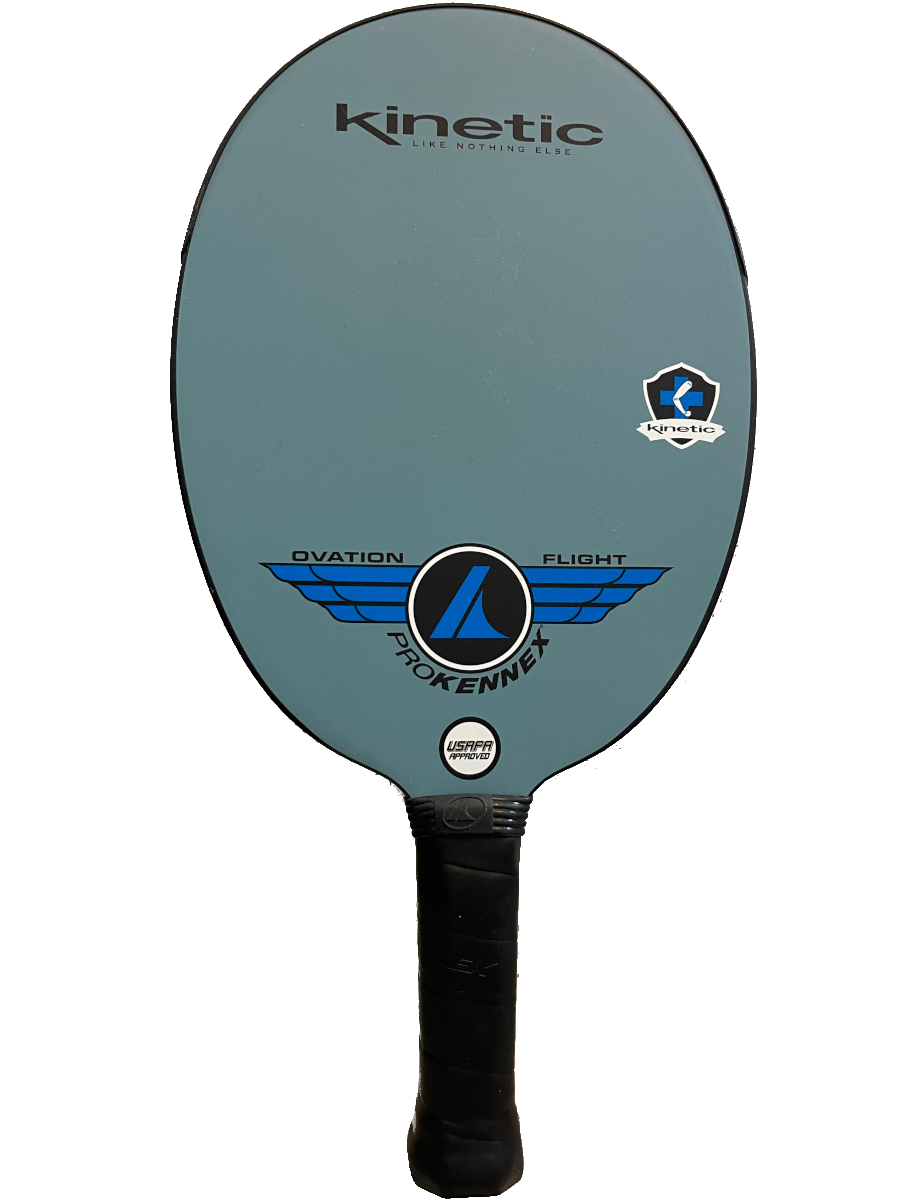
- Ovation Flight pickleball paddle
- Type: Subsidiary
- Industry: Sporting goods
- Founded: 1978; 48 years ago
- Headquarters: Taichung, Taiwan
- Area served: Worldwide
- Key people: Lo Kunnan
- Products: Racquet sports equipment and accessories
- Parent: Kunnan Enterprise Ltd.
- Website: prokennex.com

ProKennex is a Taiwanese manufacturer of racquet sports equipment for tennis, squash, badminton, racquetball, and pickleball. The company enjoyed wide global distribution in the 1980s, when manufacturing in Taiwan was booming due to domestic economic conditions. Parent company Kunnan Enterprise Ltd. has faced financial difficulties since the mid 1990s, leading to a contraction of the ProKennex name globally. Today, the company focuses on a niche set of consumers interested in technology advancements in racquet sports. The company focuses on this aspect of its products by promoting itself as a "science and design company", rather than a standard racket manufacturer.

== History ==
The origins of the company began in 1965 when Lo Kunnan, the son of a plastic toy gun manufacturer, began producing wooden badminton racquets in the backyard of his father's house. In 1968, Lo moved on to producing wooden tennis racquets, followed by aluminum racquets in 1973.

In 1969, Lo launched sporting goods company Kunnan Enterprises Ltd.; it quickly became the world's biggest badminton producer. The company began branding their rackets in 1978. The brand was originally called "Kennedy", named after the President of the United States John F. Kennedy. Later, because the presidential brand was deemed too political, it was renamed to "Kennex"; then to "ProKennex" (Chinese: 「肯尼士」) to avoid conflict with tennis ball maker "Tennex".

They made the world's first mid-size graphite tennis racquet in 1980, followed by the world's first graphite squash racquet in 1983. ProKennex also began using carbon fiber technology and exporting to other countries via a U.S. company. By 1980, it grew to be the world's largest tennis racket manufacturer; its rackets were sold in more than 60 countries, accounting for 1/4 of the global market. At that time, ProKennex owned the world's largest tennis racket factory, and it also made rackets for other global brands such as Prince, Dunlop, Fischer, and Adidas. Professional tennis players sponsored by ProKennex included Li Na and Peng Shuai. The company became known as the "Taiwan miracle".

During this heyday period, ProKennex began to make other sporting goods such as golf clubs, fishing rods, sneakers, and sportswear. Its parent company Kunnan Enterprises also expanded into unfamiliar ventures including computer, securities, and construction companies, and tried to start up a commercial bank. ProKennex even owned a large hotel (Chinese: 「肯尼士太飯店」) in Taichung, now called "Grand City Hotel" (Chinese: 「五都大飯店」). But the expansion and diversification proved too ambitious and complex; mounting financial liabilities forced Kunnan Enterprises into bankruptcy in 2000.

In 2002, ProKennex reorganized to focus on racket sports and Lo Kunnan retired from the business he founded.

== Related companies ==
- Kennex is a separate entity from the reorganization and uses a similar company logo; it markets household items.
- 拓凱實業 is the global leader in carbon fiber tennis racket manufacturing; its founder 沈文振 is a former vice president at Kunnan.
