= Andreas Seppi =

Italian tennis player (born 1984)

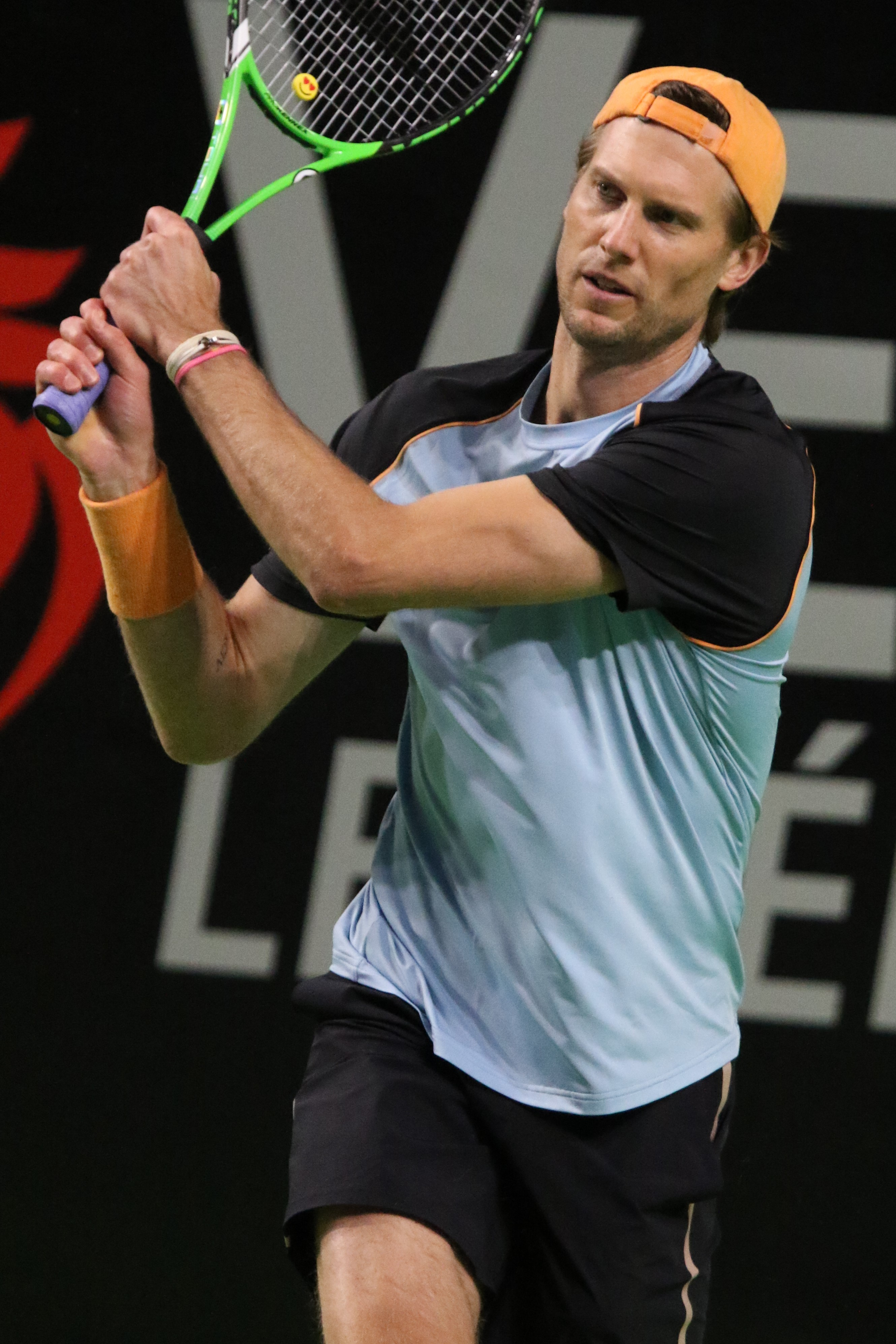
- Seppi in 2021
- Country (sports): Italy
- Born: 21 February 1984 (age 42) Bolzano, Italy
- Height: 1.91 m (6 ft 3 in)
- Turned pro: 2002
- Retired: 2022
- Plays: Right-handed (two-handed backhand)
- Coach: Massimo Sartori
- Prize money: US$11,816,212
- Official website: andreasseppi.com

Singles
- Career record: 386–422
- Career titles: 3
- Highest ranking: No. 18 (28 January 2013)

Grand Slam singles results
- Australian Open: 4R (2013, 2015, 2017, 2018)
- French Open: 4R (2012)
- Wimbledon: 4R (2013)
- US Open: 3R (2008, 2013, 2015, 2021)

Other tournaments
- Olympic Games: 2R (2008, 2012, 2016)

Doubles
- Career record: 115–240
- Career titles: 1
- Highest ranking: No. 50 (14 April 2014)

Grand Slam doubles results
- Australian Open: QF (2009)
- French Open: 3R (2018)
- Wimbledon: 3R (2012)
- US Open: QF (2011)

Other doubles tournaments
- Olympic Games: QF (2016)

Mixed doubles
- Career record: 5–3

Grand Slam mixed doubles results
- Wimbledon: 2R (2011)

Other mixed doubles tournaments
- Olympic Games: 1R (2012)

Team competitions
- Davis Cup: SF (2014)
- Hopman Cup: RR (2013, 2014)

Andreas Seppi (Note: Austrian German pronunciation: [anˈdreːas ˈsɛpi], Italian pronunciation: [anˈdrɛːas ˈsɛppi].) (born 21 February 1984) is an Italian former professional tennis player. He reached a career-high singles ranking of world No. 18 in January 2013. Seppi won three ATP Tour titles in singles and one in doubles, and was the first Italian to win a title on all three surfaces.

== Personal life ==
Seppi hails from the northern Italian province of South Tyrol. He was born in Bolzano to Hugo, a truck driver, and Maria-Luise, who worked in a sports shop. He grew up with his sister Maria in a village near Bolzano, Kaltern an der Weinstraße. Apart from tennis, Andreas loves skiing and is an AC Milan fan, he is a native German speaker and also speaks Italian and English fluently.

He considered grass and indoor hard courts his favourite surfaces and was coached by Massimo Sartori. His nicknames are Andy and also Seppio, given to him by his coach.

== Equipment and sponsoring ==
Seppi used Pro Kennex tennis racquets and wore Fila gear.

== Tennis career ==
=== 2001–2003: Professional and ATP debut ===
Seppi turned pro in 2001, playing exclusively on the ATP Futures and ATP Challenger Series circuit for three seasons. He won his first Futures event in 2003, in Munich, Germany, defeating Lars Uebel. In addition, he qualified for his first two ATP events at the 2003 Generali Open in Kitzbühel and in Bucharest, where he was defeated by Olivier Mutis and José Acasuso, respectively.

=== 2004–2005: Major & top 100 debut, first Masters quarterfinal ===
In 2004, Seppi made his Davis Cup debut against Georgia, losing to Irakli Labadze in five sets. In the 2004 Generali Open in Kitzbühel, Seppi entered as a wildcard into the main draw. He failed to convert 10 match points against Rainer Schüttler in a second-round loss. A few weeks later, Seppi was able to gain revenge for this loss. In his Grand Slam debut at the 2004 US Open as a qualifier, he defeated Schüttler, coming from two sets to love down.

Seppi finished the 2005 season in the top 100 for the first time. He qualified for four ATP Masters Series events, with his best performance at the 2005 Hamburg Masters, where he reached the quarterfinals. In the Davis Cup, Seppi came back from two sets to love down and defeated Juan Carlos Ferrero, before losing to Rafael Nadal in the reverse singles. After this performance, he reached his first ATP Tour semifinal in Palermo, where he defeated defending champion Tomáš Berdych, before falling to Igor Andreev.

=== 2006–2007: Maiden ATP final ===
In 2006, Seppi made semifinals on hard courts in Sydney and grass in Nottingham, showing that he was able to perform well on other surfaces besides clay. Seppi ended the streak of four consecutive Sydney titles for Lleyton Hewitt and, in the process, saved two match points. Seppi lost against Andre Agassi in his last appearance at Wimbledon.

At the 2007 Australian Open, Seppi defeated American Bobby Reynolds in five sets, after saving a match point. The match was scheduled for the afternoon, but was put back due to the heat. This match finished at 3:34 am, which was at the time the latest time for a match to be completed until it was surpassed by the Lleyton Hewitt and Marcos Baghdatis match at the 2008 Australian Open which started at 11:47pm and finished at 4:33am because of a two-hour delay.

Seppi made the final of the Sunrise Challenger, defeating Gustavo Kuerten, Juan Martín del Potro, and Nicolás Massú, and then losing to Gaël Monfils. After Sunrise, Seppi struggled with his ranking outside the top 100. He surprisingly made his first ATP Tour final in Gstaad, where he defeated Stefan Koubek and Igor Andreev both in third-set tiebreakers. Seppi led 5–3 in the third set and had the opportunity to serve for the championship but failed to do so losing to Paul-Henri Mathieu. Seppi made his first semi final indoors in Vienna defeating two-time defending champion Ivan Ljubičić along the way to complete the feat of at least making the semi-finals of events played on clay, hardcourt, grass and indoors, eventually finishing in the top 80 for the third consecutive year.

=== 2008–2010: Win over Nadal, Maiden Masters semifinal ===
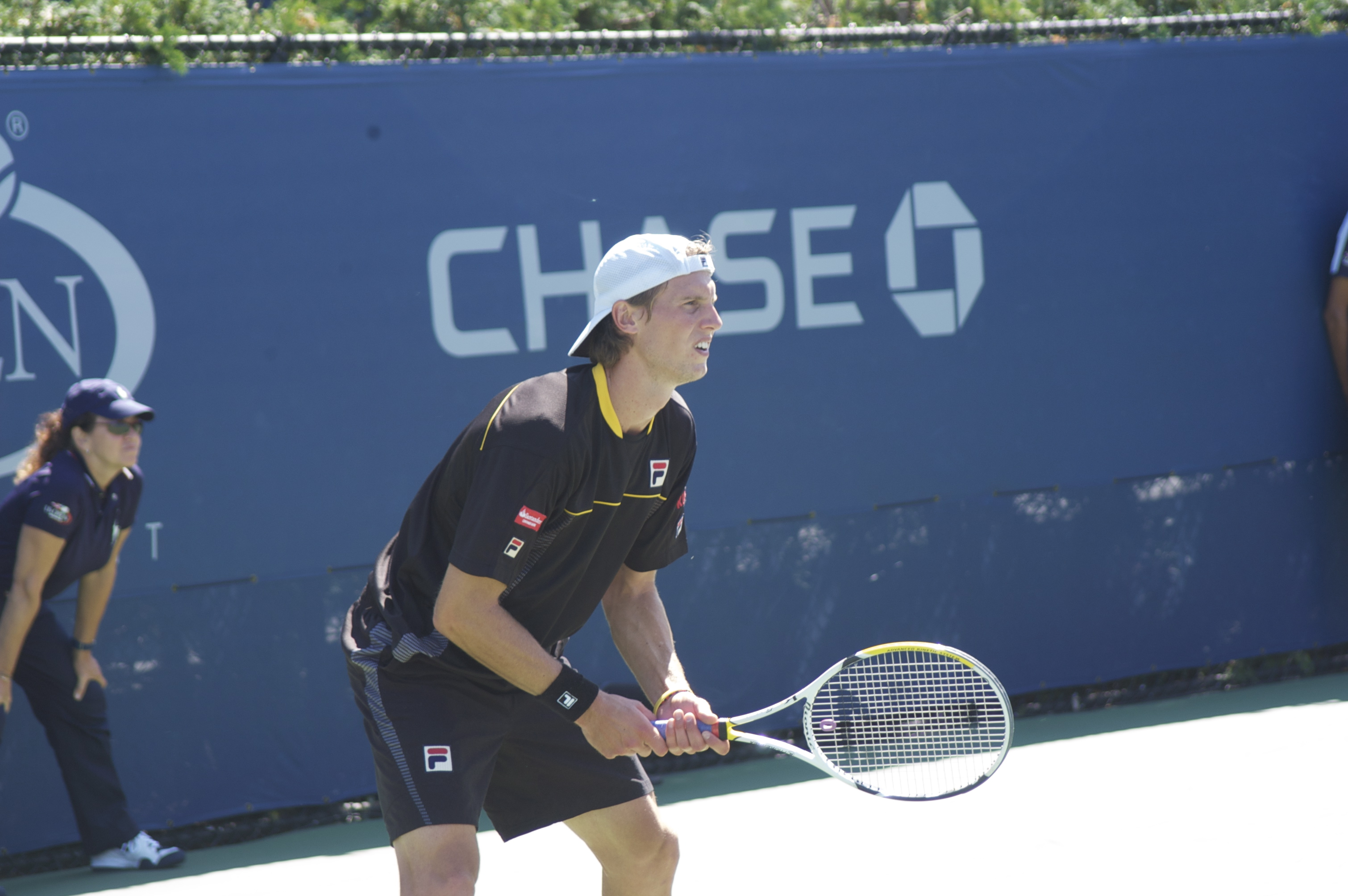
Andreas Seppi at 2008 US Open.

In the 2008 season Seppi won his first Challenger title at Bergamo where he defeated Julien Benneteau in the final for the loss of 1 set in the tournament.

He made the quarterfinals of the indoor event in Rotterdam where he defeated Lleyton Hewitt in the process saving a match point. Then he scored his biggest win over the then world number 2 Rafael Nadal before losing to Robin Söderling.

Seppi made the semifinals of the 2008 Hamburg Masters, this was the first time he reached that stage of the Masters Series events, he defeated Richard Gasquet, Juan Mónaco and Nicolas Kiefer in a match where he led 6–3, 5–3 before winning which included Seppi winning the last 4 games and went for 3 hours and 13 minutes in duration, before losing to Roger Federer in the semi-finals.

In 2009 Seppi made the semifinals in Belgrade and in Umag both on clay, while winning his second Challenger title in San Marino defeating countryman Potito Starace in the final. Seppi found success at the challenger level in 2010 where he won his third challenger title at Kitzbühel accounting for Victor Crivoi in the final.

=== 2011–2012: First major fourth round, Maiden singles title, top 25 year-end ranking ===
For the second time Seppi won the Challenger title at Bergamo in 2011 and later in the year followed that victory with his first ATP title in 2011 at Eastbourne which came on grass defeating Janko Tipsarević in the final after the Serbian retired at 5–3 down in the 3rd set. Earlier in the day Seppi played Igor Kunitsyn in the semi-final which he also won in 3 sets.

Seppi won his second ATP title in 2012 at Belgrade defeating David Nalbandian in the semi-finals and Benoît Paire in the final.

En route the quarterfinals at the 2012 Rome Masters, he defeated Stanislas Wawrinka in the third round, having saved six match points in the process.

Seppi reached the fourth round of a Grand Slam for the first time in his career at the 2012 French Open, eventually being defeated by world #1 Novak Djokovic in five sets having won the first two sets. He defeated former World No. 3 Nikolay Davydenko in the first round and former top ten player Fernando Verdasco along the way.

He did not fare as well at the other Grand Slam tournaments, losing in the first round of the Australian and US Opens as well as Wimbledon.

He won his third title at the 2012 Kremlin Cup defeating Thomaz Bellucci.

Seppi finished the year 2012 ranked World No. 23 in singles, his best year-end ranking in his career.

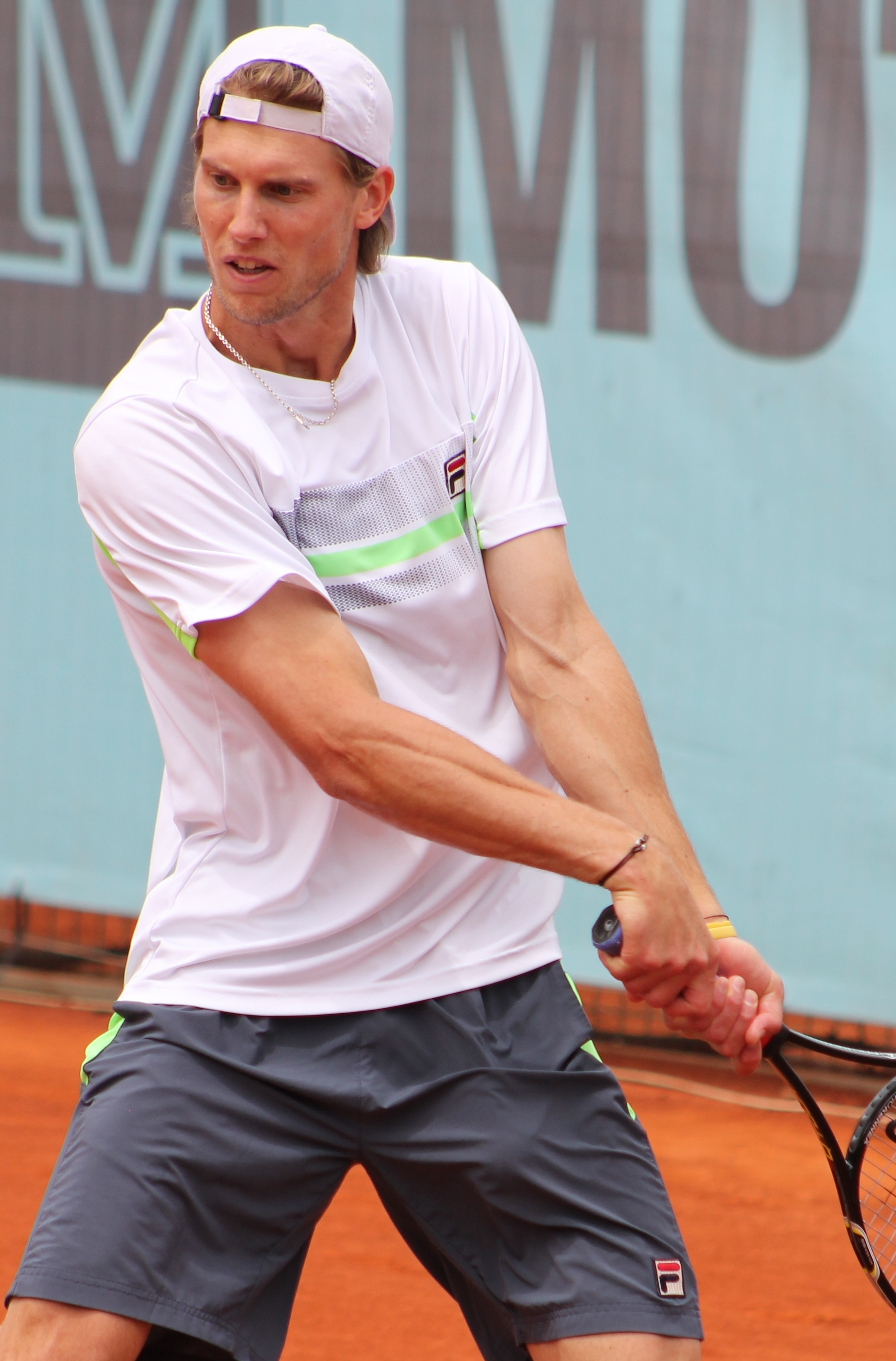
Seppi at the 2014 Madrid Open.

=== 2013: Top 20 debut and career-high ranking ===
Seppi started his 2013 season at the Hopman Cup, partnering 2010 French Open champion Francesca Schiavone. Seppi lost all three of his singles rubbers, to Novak Djokovic, Bernard Tomic and Tommy Haas, but combined with Schiavone to win all their doubles rubbers, against the Serbian pairing of Djokovic and Ana Ivanovic, the Australian pairing of Tomic and Ashleigh Barty and the German pairing of Haas and Tatjana Malek. The win over the Serbian pair of Djokovic and Ivanovic marked the first victory for Seppi and Schiavone over their respective opponents in any capacity, as Seppi has never defeated Djokovic and Schiavone has never beaten Ivanovic in professional singles matches.

At the Sydney International the following week, Seppi reached the semifinals as the third seed, losing to eventual champion Tomic.

Seppi reached the fourth round of the 2013 Australian Open for the first time at this Major, a result which saw him enter the top 20 in singles for the first time at a career-high of World No. 18 on 28 January 2013.

Mixed results followed the Australian Open, with a quarterfinal loss in Dubai to eventual champion Djokovic (extending the Italian's winless record to 0–11) and a fourth-round loss in Miami to Andy Murray, who went on to win the tournament.

=== 2014: Three consecutive third rounds at Masters 1000 ===
Seppi's 2014 season started poorly; losing every match at the Hopman Cup. In the Sydney International, Seppi was seeded 3rd. He was defeated by Marinko Matosevic in the second round (bye first round). In the Australian Open, he beat Lleyton Hewitt in five sets but lost to Donald Young in the second round.

At the Rotterdam Open, he was defeated by Tomáš Berdych in the first round. He then lost to Michaël Llodra in Marseille. Seppi did manage to find some form in Dubai, reaching the second round by beating Florian Mayer coming from 3–0 down in the third set. The match ended 4–6, 6–1, 7–5. He was then defeated by Philipp Kohlschreiber. He reached the third rounds of the Indian Wells and the Miami Masters losing to Stan Wawrinka and David Ferrer respectively. At the 2014 Monte-Carlo Rolex Masters Seppi defeated no.13 seed Mikhail Youzhny and Pablo Andújar but lost to Rafael Nadal in the third round.

=== 2015: Win over Federer, Maiden ATP 500 final ===
In January at the 2015 Australian Open, the unseeded Seppi caused a huge upset by beating second seed and four-time champion Roger Federer in the third round in four sets, after having lost to him in ten previous meetings. Seppi was defeated in the next round by Nick Kyrgios in five sets, despite having a match point in the fourth set.

Seppi's next tournament after the Australian Open was the 2015 PBZ Zagreb Indoors, where he was seeded fifth. There, he reached his first final since 2012 but lost to Spaniard Guillermo García López in straight sets.

In June, at the 2015 Gerry Weber Open, Roger Federer took his revenge for the earlier in the year loss over Seppi by winning the title. This was the biggest title championship match thus far for Seppi that he lost in straight sets.

=== 2016: Maiden doubles title, decline in rankings ===
He started off with a decent result in the 2016 Australian Open, as the 28th seed he managed to get to the third round before losing to eventual champion Novak Djokovic. He had two disappointing results in the 2016 Indian Wells Masters & the 2016 Miami Open, In the 2016 Indian Wells Masters he lost to 9th seed John Isner and in the 2016 Miami Open he lost to 27th seed Alexandr Dolgopolov. In the Italian Open he lost to Richard Gasquet in the second round. Seppi crashed out of the 2016 French Open in the first round to Ernest Gulbis. In 2016 Wimbledon Championships, Seppi smashed Guillermo García López in straight sets before losing to eventual finalist Milos Raonic in the second round. In the US Open, Seppi beat Frenchman Stéphane Robert before falling to 4 seed Rafa Nadal.

Seppi finished the year ranked World No. 87 in singles.

=== 2017: Third Australian Open fourth round ===
Seppi's first ATP tournament of the year was the Australian Open. After beating Paul-Henri Mathieu in the first round, he upset No.14 Nick Kyrgios, despite losing the first 2 sets of the match. He then took down Steve Darcis in 4 sets before falling to Stan Wawrinka in a tight 3-set, 3-tiebreak match. This matched Seppi's best result in singles at a Major.

He then played the Sofia Open where he lost to Steve Darcis in the Round of 16. He lost in the first round of a challenger in Bergamo. He then lost in the first round of the Dubai Duty Free Tennis Championships to an in-form Fernando Verdasco.

=== 2018: Fourth Australian Open fourth round ===
At the Australian Open 2018 he again reached the round of 16 for the fourth time in his career before losing to Kyle Edmund in 4 sets.

At the 2018 ABN AMRO World Tennis Tournament, he entered in the qualifying draw, but lost in qualifying competition to Martin Kližan. Seppi then gained a spot in the main draw as lucky loser, where he defeated João Sousa in three sets at first round. In the second round, he upset No.3 seed, Alexander Zverev in straights sets. In the quarterfinals, he defeated Daniil Medvedev to reach the semifinals, but lost to the newly returned to the No.1 position in the ATP rankings, Roger Federer in straight sets, failing to get the spot in the final.

=== 2019–2020: Tenth ATP final ===
Seppi reached the final in 2019 in Sydney, where he lost to Alex de Minaur.

He also reached the final of the 2020 New York Open where he was defeated by Kyle Edmund.

=== 2021: Back to Top 100, Fourth US Open third round ===
He won his tenth title at the 2021 Biella Challenger Indoor III becoming at the age of 37, the oldest champion from Italy in the history of the circuit. In addition, he joined Ivo Karlović, Tommy Robredo and Stéphane Robert as titlists aged 37 or older in the last four years. As a result, he moved back to the top 100.

At the 2021 US Open he reached the second round after a five setter with a final set tiebreak 2–6, 7–5, 6–4, 2–6, 7–6(13) where he defeated Márton Fucsovics, saving 5 match points. He then went on to reach the third round for the fourth time in his career defeating tenth seed Hubert Hurkacz in a stunning victory in four sets also with a final set tiebreak 2–6 6–4 6–4 7–6(6).

=== 2022: 66th consecutive major appearance, Retirement ===
He competed in his 66th consecutive major at the 2022 Australian Open. His streak of 66 straight major appearances is the second longest active and third longest of all time behind Lopez's streak of 79 and Verdasco's 67 appearances.

He failed to qualify for the 2022 French Open ending his consecutive appearances streak at this Major and overall in Majors. He also failed to qualify for the 2022 Wimbledon Championships. As of the 2022 US Open he was in sixth place on the list of Grand Slam appearances overall with 67.

In early October, he announced his retirement after the Sparkassen ATP Challenger in Ortisei, his hometown. He lost in the first round to Yannick Hanfmann.

== Performance timelines ==
Key
W	F	SF	QF	#R	RR	Q#	P#	DNQ	A	Z#	PO	G	S	B	NMS	NTI	P	NH

(W) winner; (F) finalist; (SF) semifinalist; (QF) quarterfinalist; (#R) rounds 4, 3, 2, 1; (RR) round-robin stage; (Q#) qualification round; (P#) preliminary round; (DNQ) did not qualify; (A) absent; (Z#) Davis/Fed Cup Zonal Group (with number indication) or (PO) play-off; (G) gold, (S) silver or (B) bronze Olympic/Paralympic medal; (NMS) not a Masters tournament; (NTI) not a Tier I tournament; (P) postponed; (NH) not held; (SR) strike rate (events won / competed); (W–L) win–loss record.
To avoid confusion and double counting, these charts are updated at the conclusion of a tournament or when the player's participation has ended.

Only main-draw results in ATP Tour, Grand Slam tournaments, Davis Cup/ATP Cup/Laver Cup and Olympic Games are included in win–loss records.

=== Singles ===
Tournament	2002	2003	2004	2005	2006	2007	2008	2009	2010	2011	2012	2013	2014	2015	2016	2017	2018	2019	2020	2021	2022	SR	W–L	Win %
Grand Slam tournaments
Australian Open	A	A	Q3	Q2	1R	2R	2R	1R	1R	2R	1R	4R	2R	4R	3R	4R	4R	3R	2R	1R	1R	0 / 17	21–17	55%
French Open	A	A	Q3	Q2	1R	1R	1R	2R	2R	2R	4R	3R	3R	1R	1R	2R	1R	1R	1R	2R	Q1	0 / 16	12–16	44%
Wimbledon	A	A	Q2	1R	2R	2R	3R	3R	2R	2R	1R	4R	1R	3R	2R	2R	2R	2R	NH	2R	Q3	0 / 16	18–16	53%
US Open	A	A	2R	1R	1R	1R	3R	1R	1R	1R	1R	3R	2R	3R	2R	1R	2R	1R	1R	3R	Q3	0 / 18	12–18	40%
Win–loss	0–0	0–0	1–1	0–2	1–4	2–4	5–4	3–4	2–4	3–4	3–4	10–4	4–4	7–4	4–4	5–4	5–4	3–3	1–3	4–4	0–1	0 / 67	63–67	48%
ATP Masters 1000
Indian Wells Open	A	A	A	Q2	1R	2R	2R	2R	2R	1R	2R	3R	3R	3R	2R	A	A	1R	NH	A	Q1	0 / 12	9–12	43%
Miami Open	A	A	A	1R	1R	1R	2R	2R	1R	2R	1R	4R	3R	A	2R	2R	A	A	NH	A	Q2	0 / 12	8–12	40%
Monte-Carlo Masters	A	A	A	2R	2R	2R	2R	2R	2R	A	2R	1R	3R	1R	A	1R	3R	1R	NH	A	A	0 / 13	11–13	46%
Madrid Open	A	A	Q1	Q2	Q1	A	1R	3R	1R	A	2R	1R	1R	A	A	Q2	A	1R	NH	A	A	0 / 7	3–7	30%
German Open	A	A	1R	QF	2R	Q2	SF	Not Masters Series														0 / 4	8–4	67%
Italian Open	A	A	1R	2R	1R	LQ	2R	2R	2R	1R	QF	1R	1R	A	2R	1R	1R	1R	A	A	A	0 / 14	8–14	36%
Canadian Open	A	A	A	Q1	Q1	A	1R	A	A	1R	1R	2R	2R	1R	A	A	A	A	NH	A	A	0 / 6	2–6	25%
Cincinnati Open	A	A	A	Q1	1R	Q2	3R	2R	A	1R	2R	1R	2R	2R	A	A	A	A	Q1	Q1	A	0 / 8	6–8	43%
Shanghai Masters	Not Masters Series							A	3R	A	2R	2R	A	1R	Q1	A	2R	A	NH			0 / 5	5–5	50%
Paris Masters	A	A	A	1R	1R	2R	1R	2R	Q1	3R	2R	1R	Q1	2R	1R	Q1	Q1	2R	A	Q2	A	0 / 11	6–11	35%
Win–loss	0–0	0–0	0–2	5–5	2–7	3–4	10–9	8–7	5–6	3–6	9–9	5–9	6–7	3–6	3–4	1–3	3–3	0–5	0–0	0–0	0–0	0 / 92	66–92	42%
Career statistics
	2002	2003	2004	2005	2006	2007	2008	2009	2010	2011	2012	2013	2014	2015	2016	2017	2018	2019	2020	2021	2022	Career		
Tournaments	0	2	9	16	28	23	28	28	28	25	27	27	28	24	24	17	21	24	7	13	5	Career total: 404		
Titles	0	0	0	0	0	0	0	0	0	1	2	0	0	0	0	0	0	0	0	0	0	Career total: 3		
Finals	0	0	0	0	0	1	0	0	0	1	4	0	0	2	0	0	0	1	1	0	0	Career total: 10		
Overall win–loss	0–0	0–2	7–10	19–17	20–30	22–24	30–30	24–31	24–28	25–24	38–27	30–29	24–30	26–25	20–25	18–18	24–23	19–24	7–7	7–13	2–5	3 / 404	386–422	48%
Win (%)	0%	0%	41%	53%	40%	48%	50%	44%	46%	51%	58%	51%	44%	51%	44%	50%	51%	44%	50%	35%	29%	Career total: 47.77%		
Year End Ranking	353	240	146	68	74	50	35	49	52	38	23	25	45	29	87	86	37	72	105	102	358	$11,816,212		

=== Doubles ===
Tournament	2005	2006	2007	2008	2009	2010	2011	2012	2013	2014	2015	2016	2017	2018	2019	2020	2021	2022	W–L
Grand Slam tournaments
Australian Open	A	A	A	1R	QF	3R	1R	1R	2R	2R	1R	3R	A	A	1R	1R	A	A	9–11
French Open	A	1R	A	1R	2R	1R	1R	1R	2R	1R	1R	1R	2R	3R	1R	A	A	A	5–13
Wimbledon	A	1R	A	1R	1R	2R	1R	3R	2R	1R	1R	1R	1R	1R	1R	NH	A	A	4–13
US Open	1R	1R	1R	1R	3R	1R	QF	1R	1R	2R	2R	2R	2R	2R	2R	A	A	A	11–15
Win–loss	0–1	0–3	0–1	0–4	6–4	3–4	3–4	2–4	3–4	2–4	1–4	3–4	2–3	3–3	1–4	0–1	0–0	0–0	29–52

== ATP career finals ==
=== Singles: 10 (3 titles, 7 runner-ups) ===
Legend Grand Slam (0–0) ATP Finals (0–0) ATP Masters 1000 (0–0) ATP 500 Series (0–1) International / ATP 250 Series (3–6)	Titles by surface Hard (1–4) Clay (1–1) Grass (1–2) Carpet (0–0)	Titles by setting Outdoor (2–4) Indoor (1–3)

Result	W–L	Date	Tournament	Tier	Surface	Opponent	Score
Loss	0–1	Jul 2007	Swiss Open, Switzerland	International	Clay	(France) Paul-Henri Mathieu	7–6^{(7–1)}, 4–6, 5–7
Win	1–1	Jun 2011	Eastbourne International, United Kingdom	250 Series	Grass	(Serbia) Janko Tipsarević	7–6^{(7–5)}, 3–6, 5–3 ret.
Win	2–1	May 2012	Serbia Open, Serbia	250 Series	Clay	(France) Benoît Paire	6–3, 6–2
Loss	2–2	Jun 2012	Eastbourne International, United Kingdom	250 Series	Grass	(United States) Andy Roddick	3–6, 2–6
Loss	2–3	Sep 2012	Moselle Open, France	250 Series	Hard (i)	(France) Jo-Wilfried Tsonga	1–6, 2–6
Win	3–3	Oct 2012	Kremlin Cup, Russia	250 Series	Hard (i)	(Brazil) Thomaz Bellucci	3–6, 7–6^{(7–3)}, 6–3
Loss	3–4	Feb 2015	Zagreb Indoors, Croatia	250 Series	Hard (i)	(Spain) Guillermo García López	6–7^{(5–7)}, 3–6
Loss	3–5	Jun 2015	Halle Open, Germany	500 Series	Grass	(Switzerland) Roger Federer	6–7^{(1–7)}, 4–6
Loss	3–6	Jan 2019	Sydney International, Australia	250 Series	Hard	(Australia) Alex de Minaur	5–7, 6–7^{(5–7)}
Loss	3–7	Feb 2020	New York Open, United States	250 Series	Hard (i)	(United Kingdom) Kyle Edmund	5–7, 1–6

=== Doubles: 7 (1 title, 6 runner-ups) ===
Legend Grand Slam (0–0) ATP Finals (0–0) ATP Masters 1000 (0–0) ATP 500 Series (1–2) International / ATP 250 Series (0–4)	Titles by surface Hard (1–3) Clay (0–1) Grass (0–1) Carpet (0–1)	Titles by setting Outdoor (1–5) Indoor (0–1)

Result	W–L	Date	Tournament	Tier	Surface	Partner	Opponents	Score
Loss	0–1	Feb 2006	Zagreb Indoors, Croatia	International	Carpet (i)	(Italy) Davide Sanguinetti	(Czech Republic) Jaroslav Levinský (Slovakia) Michal Mertiňák	6–7^{(7–9)}, 1–6
Loss	0–2	Jul 2010	Swedish Open, Sweden	250 Series	Clay	(Italy) Simone Vagnozzi	(Sweden) Robert Lindstedt (Romania) Horia Tecău	4–6, 5–7
Loss	0–3	Oct 2010	Japan Open, Japan	500 Series	Hard	(Russia) Dmitry Tursunov	(United States) Eric Butorac (Netherlands Antilles) Jean-Julien Rojer	3–6, 2–6
Loss	0–4	Jan 2011	Qatar Open, Qatar	250 Series	Hard	(Italy) Daniele Bracciali	(Spain) Marc López (Spain) Rafael Nadal	3–6, 6–7^{(4–7)}
Loss	0–5	Jun 2011	Eastbourne International, UK	250 Series	Grass	(Bulgaria) Grigor Dimitrov	(Israel) Jonathan Erlich (Israel) Andy Ram	3–6, 3–6
Loss	0–6	Oct 2013	China Open, China	500 Series	Hard	(Italy) Fabio Fognini	(Belarus) Max Mirnyi (Romania) Horia Tecău	4–6, 2–6
Win	1–6	Feb 2016	Dubai Tennis Championships, UAE	500 Series	Hard	(Italy) Simone Bolelli	(Spain) Feliciano López (Spain) Marc López	6–2, 3–6, [14–12]

== Challenger and Futures finals ==
=== Singles: 14 (11–3) ===
Legend (singles) ATP Challenger Tour (10–3) ITF Futures Tour (1–0)	Titles by surface Hard (8–1) Clay (2–1) Grass (0–0) Carpet (1–1)

Result	W–L	Date	Tournament	Tier	Surface	Opponent	Score
Win	1–0	Jan 2003	Germany F1C, Munich	Futures	Carpet (i)	(Germany) Lars Uebel	6–4, 7–5
Loss	1–1	Jul 2003	Oberstaufen, Germany	Challenger	Clay	(Argentina) Martín Vassallo Argüello	1–6, 4–6
Loss	1–2	Mar 2007	Sunrise, United States	Challenger	Hard	(France) Gaël Monfils	3–6, 6–1, 1–6
Win	2–2	Feb 2008	Bergamo, Italy	Challenger	Hard (i)	(France) Julien Benneteau	2–6, 6–2, 7–5
Win	3–2	Aug 2009	San Marino, San Marino	Challenger	Clay	(Italy) Potito Starace	7–6^{(7–4)}, 2–6, 6–4
Win	4–2	Aug 2010	Kitzbühel, Austria	Challenger	Clay	(Romania) Victor Crivoi	6–2, 6–1
Win	5–2	Feb 2011	Bergamo, Italy	Challenger	Hard (i)	(Luxembourg) Gilles Müller	3–6, 6–3, 6–4
Win	6–2	Oct 2011	Mons, Belgium	Challenger	Hard (i)	(France) Julien Benneteau	2–6, 6–3, 7–6^{(7–4)}
Loss	6–3	Nov 2012	Ortisei, Italy	Challenger	Carpet	(Germany) Benjamin Becker	1–6, 4–6
Win	7–3	Nov 2013	Ortisei, Italy	Challenger	Hard (i)	(Germany) Simon Greul	7–6^{(7–4)}, 6–2
Win	8–3	Nov 2014	Ortisei, Italy	Challenger	Hard (i)	(Germany) Matthias Bachinger	6–4, 6–3
Win	9–3	Jan 2018	Canberra, Australia	Challenger	Hard	(Hungary) Márton Fucsovics	5–7, 6–4, 6–3
Win	10–3	Sep 2019	Cary, United States	Challenger	Hard	(United States) Michael Mmoh	6–2, 6–7, 6–3
Win	11–3	Mar 2021	Biella, Italy	Challenger	Hard (i)	(United Kingdom) Liam Broady	6–2, 6–1

=== Doubles: 2 (1–1) ===
Legend (doubles) ATP Challenger Tour (1–1) ITF Futures Tour (0–0)	Titles by surface Hard (1–0) Clay (0–1) Grass (0–0) Carpet (0–0)

Result	W–L	Date	Tournament	Tier	Surface	Partner	Opponents	Score
Loss	0–1	Jun 2004	Reggio Emilia, Italy	Challenger	Clay	(Italy) Simone Vagnozzi	(Germany) Tomas Behrend (Italy) Tomas Tenconi	4–6, 2–6
Win	1–1	Feb 2008	Bergamo, Italy	Challenger	Hard (i)	(Italy) Simone Bolelli	(United States) James Cerretani (Slovakia) Igor Zelenay	6–3, 6–0

== Top 10 wins ==
- Seppi has a 10–83 record against players who were, at the time the match was played, ranked in the top 10.

Season	2005	2006	2007	2008	...	2012	...	2015	...	2018	2019	Total
Wins	1	1	1	2		1		2		1	1	10

#	Player	Rank	Event	Surface	Rd	Score
2005
1.	(Argentina) Guillermo Cañas	10	German Open, Germany	Clay	2R	7–6^{(11–9)}, 6–2
2006
2.	(Australia) Lleyton Hewitt	4	Sydney International, Australia	Hard	QF	4–6, 7–5, 7–5
2007
3.	(Croatia) Mario Ančić	9	Open 13, France	Hard (i)	1R	4–0, ret.
2008
4.	(Spain) Rafael Nadal	2	Rotterdam Open, Netherlands	Hard (i)	2R	3–6, 6–3, 6–4
5.	(France) Richard Gasquet	9	German Open, Germany	Clay	2R	6–3, 6–2
2012
6.	(United States) John Isner	10	Italian Open, Italy	Clay	2R	2–6, 7–6^{(7–5)}, 7–5
2015
7.	(Switzerland) Roger Federer	2	Australian Open, Australia	Hard	3R	6–4, 7–6^{(7–5)}, 4–6, 7–6^{(7–5)}
8.	(Japan) Kei Nishikori	5	Halle Open, Germany	Grass	SF	4–1, ret.
2018
9.	(Germany) Alexander Zverev	4	Rotterdam Open, Netherlands	Hard (i)	2R	6–4, 6–3
2019
10.	(Russia) Karen Khachanov	8	Kremlin Cup, Russia	Hard (i)	QF	3–6, 6–3, 6–3

- Key: (Rk) first use, opponent rank; (Rd) round; (Rk) 2nd use, player rank; (Ref) reference; (F) final; (SF) semifinal; (QF) quarterfinal; (#R) rounds 4, 3, 2, 1; (RR) round-robin stage; (Q#) qualifying rounds or stages (3), 2, 1.

== See also ==
- Italian players best ranking
- Tennis in Italy
