= The Jersey International =

ATP Challenger Tour
- Event name: Jersey
- Location: Jersey, Channel Islands
- Category: ATP Challenger Tour
- Surface: Hard
- Draw: 32S/22Q/16D
- Prize money: €42,500
- Website: www.lta.org.uk

25K Jersey

ITF Women's Tour
- Event name: Aegon Pro-Series Jersey
- Location: Jersey, Channel Islands
- Category: ITF 25K
- Surface: Hard
- Draw: 32S/22Q/16D
- Prize money: €25,000
- Website: www.lta.org.uk

The Jersey International, also known as The Cavershamy International, was a professional tennis tournament for men and women played on outdoor hard courts. It was part of the ATP Challenger Series in 2008 and the ATP Challenger Tour in 2009 and 2010. As well, it was part of the ITF Women's Circuit as a 25K event annually in 2007 through 2009. The tournament was held annually in Jersey, Channel Islands.

== Past finals ==
=== Men's singles ===
Year	Champion	Runner-up	Score
2010	(Czech Republic) Jan Hernych	(Czech Republic) Jan Minář	7–6(3), 6–4
2009	(United Kingdom) Daniel Evans	(Czech Republic) Jan Minář	6–3, 6–2
2008	(France) Adrian Mannarino	(Germany) Andreas Beck	7–6(4), 7–6(4)

=== Men's doubles ===
Year	Champions	Runners-up	Score
2010	(India) Rohan Bopanna (United Kingdom) Ken Skupski	(United Kingdom) Jonathan Marray (United Kingdom) Jamie Murray	6–2, 2–6, [10–6]
2009	(United States) Eric Butorac (United States) Travis Rettenmaier	(United Kingdom) Colin Fleming (United Kingdom) Ken Skupski	6–4, 6–3
2008	(United Kingdom) Colin Fleming (United Kingdom) Ken Skupski	(Australia) Chris Guccione (Brazil) Márcio Torres	6–3, 6–2

=== Women's singles ===
Year	Champions	Runners-up	Score
2010	(Sweden) Johanna Larsson	(United Kingdom) Anna Smith	6–2, 6–3
2009	(United Kingdom) Katie O'Brien	(France) Claire Feuerstein	7–5, 1–0, ret.
2008	(United Kingdom) Elena Baltacha	(Croatia) Ana Vrljić	6–1, 6–3
2007	(Germany) Sabine Lisicki	(Croatia) Petra Martić	6–3, 6–4
2006	(United Kingdom) Anne Keothavong	(Croatia) Ana Vrljić	6–2, 6–1

=== Women's doubles ===
Year	Champions	Runners-up	Score
2010	(Estonia) Maret Ani (United Kingdom) Anna Smith	(Australia) Jarmila Groth (United Kingdom) Melanie South	7–5, 6–4
2009	(Italy) Maria-Elena Camerin (France) Stéphanie Foretz	(France) Yulia Fedossova (France) Virginie Pichet	6–4, 6–2
2008	(United States) Courtney Nagle (United States) Robin Stephenson	(France) Yulia Fedossova (France) Violette Huck	6–3, 6–3
2007	(Czech Republic) Andrea Hlaváčková (Czech Republic) Lucie Hradecká	(United Kingdom) Katie O'Brien (United Kingdom) Georgie Stoop	6–0, 6–4
