= Jan Hernych =

Czech tennis player

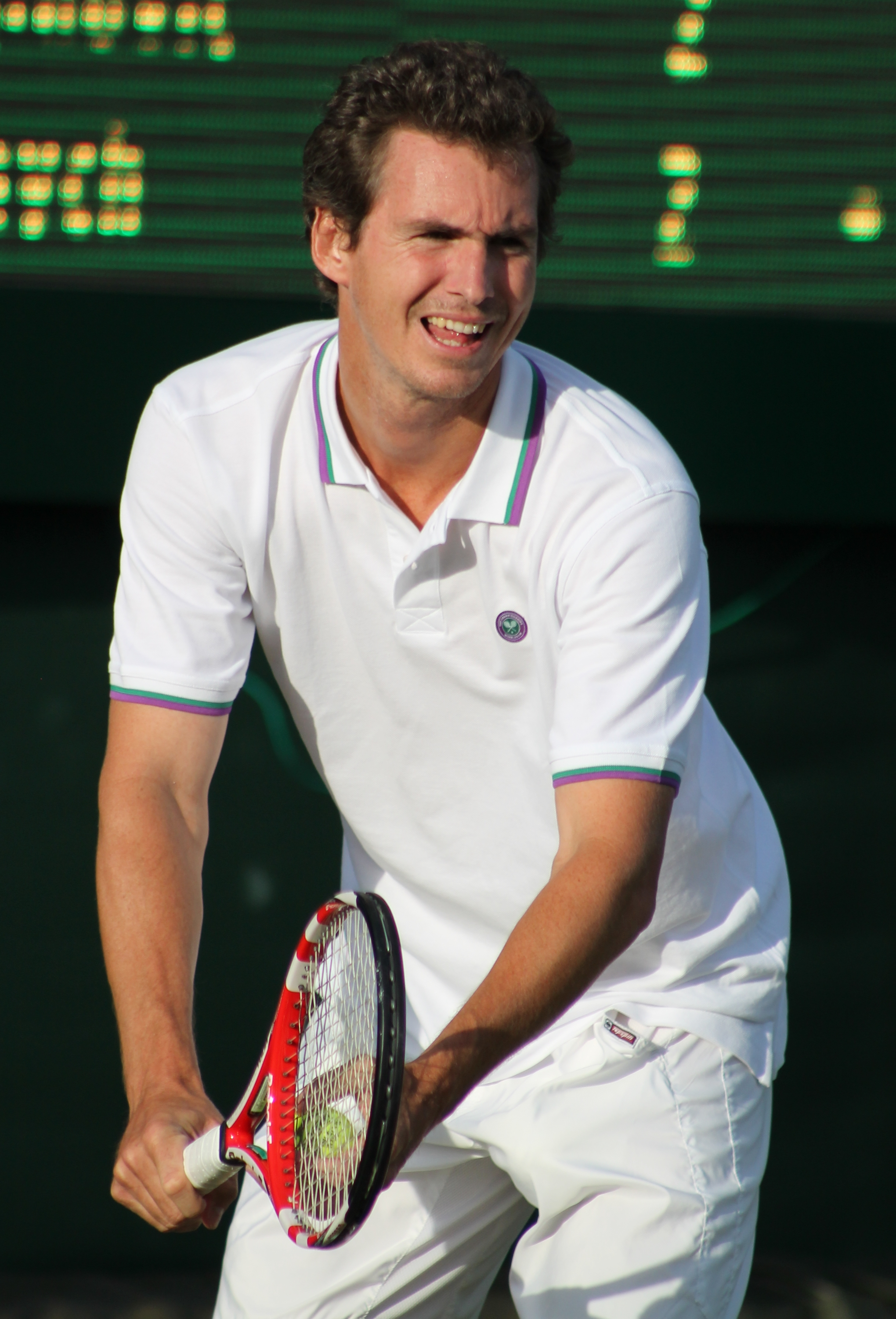
- Country (sports): Czech Republic
- Residence: Prague, Czech Republic
- Born: 7 July 1979 (age 45); Prague, Czechoslovakia
- Height: 1.90 m (6 ft 3 in)
- Turned pro: 1998
- Retired: 2018
- Plays: Right-handed (two-handed backhand)
- Prize money: $2,179,237

Singles
- Career record: 79–118
- Career titles: 0
- Highest ranking: No. 59 (27 April 2009)

Grand Slam singles results
- Australian Open: 3R (2011)
- French Open: 2R (2005)
- Wimbledon: 2R (2005, 2007, 2014)
- US Open: 2R (2006, 2009)

Doubles
- Career record: 22–25
- Career titles: 1
- Highest ranking: No. 70 (12 June 2006)

Grand Slam doubles results
- Australian Open: QF (2006)
- French Open: 2R (2006, 2009)
- Wimbledon: 2R (2005, 2006)
- US Open: 3R (2005)
- Last updated on: 2 May 2021.

Jan Hernych (born 7 July 1979) is a Czech former professional tennis player and tennis coach. Hernych turned professional in 1998 and achieved his career-high singles ranking of world No. 59 in April 2009. He won one doubles title on the ATP Tour and was runner-up in 's-Hertogenbosch in 2006.

Hernych now acts as a coach to the Czech tennis player and Wimbledon champion Markéta Vondroušová, alongside Jiří Hřebec.

== Career ==
In 2005, he was the first professional opponent of Andy Murray at the Torneo Godo, a match he won in three sets.

In 2006 he contested his first final on the tour, losing to Mario Ančić in s-Hertogenbosch, Netherlands.

In May 2009 at the BMW Open in Munich, Germany, he joined forces with countryman Ivo Minář to win their first title together in doubles.

In January 2011 at the Australian Open, Hernych posted his best-ever showing in singles play at a Grand Slam event, reaching the 3rd round for the first time. As a qualifier, he defeated Denis Istomin and No. 30 seed Thomaz Bellucci before losing to Robin Söderling.

Hernych has reached 25 singles finals in tenure as a professional tennis player, with his first final coming in 1998 and his most recent being in 2016, a span of almost twenty years. He has a record of 12 wins and 13 losses, including an 0–1 record in ATP Tour-level finals and 8–8 in Challenger finals.

== ATP Tour career finals ==
=== Singles: 1 (1 runner-up) ===
Legend Grand Slam tournaments (0–0) ATP World Tour Finals (0–0) ATP World Tour Masters 1000 (0–0) ATP World Tour 500 Series (0–0) ATP World Tour 250 Series (0–1)	Finals by surface Hard (0–0) Clay (0–0) Grass (0–1)	Finals by setting Outdoor (0–1) Indoor (0–0)

Result	W–L	Date	Tournament	Tier	Surface	Opponent	Score
Loss	0–1	Jun 2006	's-Hertogenbosch, Netherlands	250 Series	Grass	(Croatia) Mario Ančić	0–6, 7–5, 5–7

=== Doubles: 1 (1 title) ===
Legend Grand Slam tournaments (0–0) ATP World Tour Finals (0–0) ATP World Tour Masters 1000 (0–0) ATP World Tour 500 Series (0–0) ATP World Tour 250 Series (1–0)	Finals by surface Hard (0–0) Clay (1–0) Grass (0–0)	Finals by setting Outdoor (1–0) Indoor (0–0)

Result	W–L	Date	Tournament	Tier	Surface	Partner	Opponents	Score
Win	1–0	May 2009	BMW Open, Germany	250 Series	Clay	(Czech Republic) Ivo Minář	(Australia) Ashley Fisher (Australia) Jordan Kerr	6–4, 6–4

== ATP Challenger and ITF Futures finals ==
=== Singles: 24 (12–12) ===
Legend ATP Challenger (8–8) ITF Futures (4–4)	Finals by surface Hard (6–6) Clay (6–4) Grass (0–0) Carpet (0–2)

Result	W–L	Date	Tournament	Tier	Surface	Opponent	Score
Win	1–0	Jun 1998	Poland F2, Zabrze	Futures	Clay	(Argentina) Carlos Gómez-Díaz	6–4, 6–7, 6–2
Win	2–0	Jul 1999	Slovenia F1, Kranj	Futures	Clay	(Slovakia) Frantisek Babej	6–3, 6–3
Loss	2–1	Sep 2000	Czech Republic F2, Karlovy	Futures	Clay	(Austria) Zbynek Mlynarik	3–6, 6–7^{(3–7)}
Loss	2–2	Feb 2001	Andrezieux, France	Challenger	Hard	(Federal Republic of Yugoslavia) Nenad Zimonjić	6–7^{(5–7)}, 2–6
Loss	2–3	May 2001	Prague, Czech Republic	Challenger	Clay	(Czech Republic) Slava Doseděl	2–6, 6–4, 1–6
Win	3–3	Oct 2001	Tulsa, United States	Challenger	Hard	(United States) Vince Spadea	7–5, 7–5
Loss	3–4	Sep 2002	Waco, United States	Challenger	Hard	(Chile) Hermes Gamonal	1–6, 6–3, 3–6
Loss	3–5	Sep 2003	Mandeville, United States	Challenger	Hard	(Russia) Dmitry Tursunov	6–3, 3–6, 4–6
Loss	3–6	Feb 2004	Wrocław, Poland	Challenger	Hard	(Slovakia) Karol Beck	7–6^{(7–4)}, 2–6, 2–6
Win	4–6	May 2004	Prague, Czech Republic	Challenger	Clay	(Czech Republic) Ivo Minář	6–1, 6–4
Win	5–6	May 2005	Prague, Czech Republic	Challenger	Clay	(Czech Republic) Jiří Vaněk	3–6, 6–4, 6–3
Win	6–6	Sep 2007	Trnava, Slovakia	Challenger	Clay	(Czech Republic) Tomáš Zíb	6–3, 3–6, 6–4
Win	7–6	May 2008	Prague, Czech Republic	Challenger	Clay	(Czech Republic) Lukáš Dlouhý	4–6, 6–2, 6–4
Loss	7–7	May 2008	Ostrava, Czech Republic	Challenger	Clay	(Czech Republic) Jiří Vaněk	3–6, 6–4, 1–6
Win	8–7	Nov 2008	Bratislava, Slovakia	Challenger	Hard	(Switzerland) Stéphane Bohli	6–2, 6–4
Win	9–7	Mar 2010	Jersey, United Kingdom	Challenger	Hard	(Czech Republic) Jan Minar	7–6^{(7–3)}, 6–4
Loss	9–8	Nov 2011	Ortisei, Italy	Challenger	Carpet	(United States) Rajeev Ram	5–7, 6–3, 6–7^{(6–8)}
Win	10–8	Mar 2012	Sarajevo, Bosnia & Herzegovina	Challenger	Hard	(Czech Republic) Jan Mertl	6–3, 3–6, 7–6^{(7–3)}
Loss	10–9	Jun 2013	Czech Republic F3, Jablonec nad Nisou	Futures	Clay	(Czech Republic) Jan Mertl	4–6, 5–7
Loss	10–10	Mar 2014	Greece F1, Heraklion	Futures	Hard	(Slovakia) Jozef Kovalík	3–6, 6–7^{(6–8)}
Win	11–10	Mar 2014	Greece F2, Heraklion	Futures	Hard	(Switzerland) Yann Marti	7–5, 6–3
Win	12–10	Oct 2014	Turkey F34, Antalya	Futures	Hard	(Venezuela) Ricardo Rodriguez	6–3, 7–5
Loss	12–11	Oct 2014	Czech Republic F4, Jablonec nad Nisou	Futures	Carpet	(Croatia) Nikola Mektić	4–6, 4–6
Loss	12–12	Feb 2016	Wrocław, Poland	Challenger	Hard	(Switzerland) Marco Chiudinelli	3–6, 6–7^{(9–11)}

== Performance timelines ==
Key
W	F	SF	QF	#R	RR	Q#	P#	DNQ	A	Z#	PO	G	S	B	NMS	NTI	P	NH

(W) winner; (F) finalist; (SF) semifinalist; (QF) quarterfinalist; (#R) rounds 4, 3, 2, 1; (RR) round-robin stage; (Q#) qualification round; (P#) preliminary round; (DNQ) did not qualify; (A) absent; (Z#) Davis/Fed Cup Zonal Group (with number indication) or (PO) play-off; (G) gold, (S) silver or (B) bronze Olympic/Paralympic medal; (NMS) not a Masters tournament; (NTI) not a Tier I tournament; (P) postponed; (NH) not held; (SR) strike rate (events won / competed); (W–L) win–loss record.
To avoid confusion and double counting, these charts are updated at the conclusion of a tournament or when the player's participation has ended.

=== Singles ===
Tournament	2001	2002	2003	2004	2005	2006	2007	2008	2009	2010	2011	2012	2013	2014	2015	SR	W–L	Win%
Grand Slam tournaments
Australian Open	Q1	A	A	Q1	2R	2R	1R	A	1R	A	3R	Q2	Q2	Q2	1R	0 / 6	4–6	40%
French Open	Q3	Q2	A	A	2R	1R	1R	Q2	1R	Q1	Q3	Q1	A	Q1	Q3	0 / 4	1–4	20%
Wimbledon	Q1	Q2	Q2	1R	2R	1R	2R	1R	1R	Q2	A	Q1	A	2R	Q1	0 / 7	3–7	30%
US Open	Q2	Q2	Q1	Q1	1R	2R	Q3	1R	2R	Q2	Q1	Q1	Q3	A	A	0 / 4	2–4	33%
Win–loss	0–0	0–0	0–0	0–1	3–4	2–4	1–3	0–2	1–4	0–0	2–1	0–0	0–0	1–1	0–1	0 / 21	10–21	32%
ATP World Tour Masters 1000
Indian Wells Masters	A	A	A	2R	3R	2R	3R	Q1	1R	A	A	A	A	A	A	0 / 5	6–5	55%
Miami Masters	A	A	A	3R	1R	1R	1R	A	2R	A	A	A	A	A	A	0 / 5	3–5	38%
Monte-Carlo Masters	A	A	A	Q2	A	2R	Q1	A	A	A	A	A	A	A	A	0 / 1	1–1	50%
Hamburg Masters	A	A	A	A	A	A	Q1	A	Not Masters Series							0 / 0	0–0	–
Madrid Masters	A	A	A	A	Q1	Q2	A	A	A	A	A	A	A	A	A	0 / 0	0–0	–
Rome Masters	A	A	A	A	Q1	A	A	A	1R	A	A	A	A	A	A	0 / 1	0–1	0%
Canada Masters	A	A	A	QF	Q1	2R	Q1	A	2R	A	A	A	A	A	A	0 / 3	5–3	63%
Cincinnati Masters	A	A	A	A	1R	Q2	A	A	1R	A	A	A	A	A	A	0 / 2	0–2	0%
Shanghai Masters	Not Held								A	A	A	Q1	A	A	A	0 / 0	0–0	–
Paris Masters	A	A	A	A	Q1	A	A	A	A	A	A	A	A	A	A	0 / 0	0–0	–
Win–loss	0–0	0–0	0–0	6–3	2–2	3–4	2–2	0–0	2–4	0–0	0–0	0–0	0–0	0–0	0–0	0 / 15	15–15	50%
Career statistics
	2001	2002	2003	2004	2005	2006	2007	2008	2009	2010	2011	2012	2013	2014	2015	SR	W–L	Win%
Titles	0	0	0	0	0	0	0	0	0	0	0	0	0	0	0	Career total: 0		
Finals	0	0	0	0	0	1	0	0	0	0	0	0	0	0	0	Career total: 1		
Overall win–loss	0–0	0–1	0–0	9–12	18–23	17–21	7–15	4–8	11–24	0–1	3–2	2–1	5–5	1–1	2–2	0 / 0	79–118	40%
Year-end ranking	178	214	248	83	74	75	156	81	113	241	168	193	219	199	186	$2,179,237		
