= 2018 Sarasota Open – Singles =

Singles
- 2018 Sarasota Open

Final
- Champion: (Bolivia) Hugo Dellien
- Runner-up: (Argentina) Facundo Bagnis
- Score: 2–6, 6–4, 6–2

Events
Singles	Doubles
← 2017 ·	Sarasota Open	· 2019 →

Frances Tiafoe was the defending champion but chose not to defend his title.

Hugo Dellien won the title after defeating Facundo Bagnis 2–6, 6–4, 6–2 in the final.

== Seeds ==
1. (Japan) Taro Daniel (first round)
2. (Canada) Peter Polansky (second round)
3. (United States) Donald Young (second round)
4. (United States) Mackenzie McDonald (first round)
5. (Switzerland) Henri Laaksonen (quarterfinals)
6. (Brazil) Thomaz Bellucci (second round)
7. (United States) Michael Mmoh (second round)
8. (Slovenia) Blaž Rola (second round)

== Draw ==
=== Key ===
- Q = Qualifier
- WC = Wild card
- LL = Lucky loser
- Alt = Alternate
- SE = Special exempt
- PR = Protected ranking
- ITF = ITF entry
- JE = Junior exempt
- w/o = Walkover
- r = Retired
- d = Defaulted
- SR = Special ranking

=== Finals ===
Semifinals
(United States) Reilly Opelka	2^{r}
(Argentina) Facundo Bagnis	5
(Bolivia) Hugo Dellien	6	6
SE	(Argentina) Juan Ignacio Londero	3	3

Final
(Argentina) Facundo Bagnis	6	4	2
(Bolivia) Hugo Dellien	2	6	6

=== Top half ===
First round
1	(Japan) T Daniel	6	2	4
(Brazil) G Clezar	3	6	6
(United States) E King	7	6
WC	(United States) T Zink	5	1
(United States) R Opelka	4	7^{7}	7
(Serbia) M Kecmanović	6	6^{5}	5
(Italy) A Arnaboldi	6	6^{6}	3
8	(Slovenia) B Rola	3	7^{8}	6
4/WC	(United States) M McDonald	6	3	2
Q	(United Kingdom) J Clarke	3	6	6
(Australia) A Santillan	6	3	6
(Germany) D Köpfer	3	6	2
(Argentina) F Bagnis	6	6
LL	(Germany) J Choinski	2	4
WC	(United States) JC Aragone	4	1
6	(Brazil) T Bellucci	6	6

Second round
(Brazil) G Clezar	7^{7}	3	6
(United States) E King	6^{5}	6	2
(United States) R Opelka	7^{8}	6
8	(Slovenia) B Rola	6^{6}	3
Q	(United Kingdom) J Clarke	6^{2}	6	7^{7}
(Australia) A Santillan	7^{7}	4	6^{1}
(Argentina) F Bagnis	3	6	7
6	(Brazil) T Bellucci	6	4	5

Quarterfinals
(Brazil) G Clezar	7	4	4
(United States) R Opelka	5	6	6
Q	(United Kingdom) J Clarke	6^{4}	4
(Argentina) F Bagnis	7^{7}	6

Semifinals
(United States) R Opelka	2^{r}
(Argentina) F Bagnis	5

=== Bottom half ===
First round
7	(United States) M Mmoh	6	6
WC	(United States) S Korda	2	4
(Bolivia) H Dellien	6	3
(Chile) C Garín	1	2^{r}
(United States) M Krueger	4	3
(United States) S Kozlov	6	6
Q	(Argentina) F Coria	4	6^{7}
3	(United States) D Young	6	7^{9}
5	(Switzerland) H Laaksonen	2	7	6
Q	(Canada) F Dancevic	6	5	0
(Australia) M Polmans	6	6
Q	(Japan) K Uchida	2	1
(United States) C Harrison	4	1
SE	(Argentina) JI Londero	6	6
SE	(Argentina) F Argüello	4	6	1^{r}
2	(Canada) P Polansky	6	2	4

Second round
7	(United States) M Mmoh	3	3
(Bolivia) H Dellien	6	6
(United States) S Kozlov	6	6
3	(United States) D Young	4	4
5	(Switzerland) H Laaksonen	6	6
(Australia) M Polmans	2	4
SE	(Argentina) JI Londero	6	6
2	(Canada) P Polansky	4	3

Quarterfinals
(Bolivia) H Dellien	5	6	7^{8}
(United States) S Kozlov	7	1	6^{6}
5	(Switzerland) H Laaksonen	1	0
SE	(Argentina) JI Londero	6	6

Semifinals
(Bolivia) H Dellien	6	6
SE	(Argentina) JI Londero	3	3
