= 2025 Sarasota Open – Singles =

Singles
- 2025 Sarasota Open

Final
- Champion: (United States) Emilio Nava
- Runner-up: (Canada) Liam Draxl
- Score: 6–2, 7–6^{(7–2)}

Events
Singles	Doubles
← 2024 ·	Sarasota Open	· 2026 →

Thanasi Kokkinakis was the defending champion but chose not to defend his title.

Emilio Nava won the title after defeating Liam Draxl 6–2, 7–6^{(7–2)} in the final.

== Seeds ==
1. (United States) Eliot Spizzirri (semifinals)
2. (Argentina) Federico Agustín Gómez (semifinals)
3. (United States) Mitchell Krueger (second round)
4. (Chile) Tomás Barrios Vera (quarterfinals)
5. (United States) Emilio Nava (champion)
6. (Kazakhstan) Dmitry Popko (withdrew)
7. (Canada) Liam Draxl (final)
8. (Argentina) Facundo Mena (first round)

== Draw ==
Key

- Q = Qualifier
- WC = Wild card
- LL = Lucky loser
- Alt = Alternate
- ITF = ITF entry
- PR = Protected ranking
- SR = Special ranking
- SE = Special exempt
- JE = Junior exempt
- JR = Junior Accelerator Programme entrant
- CO = College Accelerator Programme entrant
- NG = Next Gen Accelerator Program entrant
- w/o = Walkover
- r = Retired
- d = Defaulted

=== Finals ===
Semifinals
1	(United States) Eliot Spizzirri	6^{6}	4
5	(United States) Emilio Nava	7^{8}	6
7	(Canada) Liam Draxl	3	6	6
2	(Argentina) Federico Agustín Gómez	6	4	0

Final
5	(United States) Emilio Nava	6	7^{7}
7	(Canada) Liam Draxl	2	6^{2}

=== Top half ===
First round
1	(United States) E Spizzirri	7^{9}	6
(France) S Gueymard Wayenburg	6^{7}	1
Alt	(Brazil) K Sell	4^{r}
(United Kingdom) Charlie Robertson	4
(United States) M Cassone	4	0
Alt	(France) Mathys Erhard	6	6
LL	(France) C Denolly	2	5
LL	(France) G Blancaneaux	6	7
4	(Chile) T Barrios Vera	6	6
Q	(Argentina) GA Olivieri	3	3
Alt	(United States) M Mmoh	6	6
Q	(Brazil) D Dutra da Silva	3	3
WC	(United States) T Zink	4	5
Q	(Romania) GA Boitan	6	7
(Luxembourg) C Rodesch	4	4
5	(United States) Em Nava	6	6

Second round
1	(United States) E Spizzirri	7^{7}	6
(United Kingdom) C Robertson	6^{1}	1
Alt	(France) M Erhard	4	3
LL	(France) G Blancaneaux	6	6
4	(Chile) T Barrios Vera	4	6	6
Alt	(United States) M Mmoh	6	3	2
Q	(Romania) GA Boitan	3	2
5	(United States) Em Nava	6	6

Quarterfinals
1	(United States) E Spizzirri	6	6
LL	(France) G Blancaneaux	4	4
4	(Chile) T Barrios Vera	5	6^{3}
5	(United States) Em Nava	7	7^{7}

Semifinals
1	(United States) E Spizzirri	6^{6}	4
5	(United States) Em Nava	7^{8}	6

=== Bottom half ===
First round
7	(Canada) L Draxl	7	6
(Peru) G Bueno	5	4
WC	(United States) M Damm	6	3	5
Q	(United States) Patrick Maloney	1	6	7
Q	(Bolivia) JC Prado Ángelo	6^{3}	1
(Ecuador) A Andrade	7^{7}	6
(Austria) J Schwärzler	6^{2}	6^{5}
3	(United States) M Krueger	7^{7}	7^{7}
8	(Argentina) F Mena	6	4	5
(Romania) FC Jianu	4	6	7
(Chinese Taipei) T-l Wu	7^{7}	5	4
(Estonia) M Lajal	6^{3}	7	6
(Paraguay) AD Vallejo	4	2
Q	(Spain) I Montes de la Torre	6	6
WC	(United States) G Johns	4	1
2	(Argentina) FA Gómez	6	6

Second round
7	(Canada) L Draxl	4	6	6
Q	(United States) P Maloney	6	4	0
(Ecuador) A Andrade	7	6
3	(United States) M Krueger	5	4
(Romania) FC Jianu	6	6^{6}	6
(Estonia) M Lajal	3	7^{8}	3
Q	(Spain) I Montes de la Torre	0	6^{4}
2	(Argentina) FA Gómez	6	7^{7}

Quarterfinals
7	(Canada) L Draxl	7	7^{7}
(Ecuador) A Andrade	5	6^{4}
(Romania) FC Jianu	4	0
2	(Argentina) FA Gómez	6	6

Semifinals
7	(Canada) L Draxl	3	6	6
2	(Argentina) FA Gómez	6	4	0
