= 2015 Sarasota Open – Singles =

Singles
- 2015 Sarasota Open

Final
- Champion: (Argentina) Federico Delbonis
- Runner-up: (Argentina) Facundo Bagnis
- Score: 6–4, 6–2

Events
Singles	Doubles
← 2014 ·	Sarasota Open	· 2016 →

Nick Kyrgios was the defending champion, but did not participate.

Federico Delbonis won the title, defeating Facundo Bagnis in the final, 6–4, 6–2.

== Seeds ==
1. (United States) Tim Smyczek (first round)
2. (Argentina) Federico Delbonis (champion)
3. (Italy) Paolo Lorenzi (first round)
4. (Colombia) Alejandro González (second round)
5. (Belgium) Ruben Bemelmans (first round)
6. (Argentina) Facundo Bagnis (final)
7. (Czech Republic) Radek Štěpánek (first round)
8. (South Korea) Chung Hyeon (first round)

== Draw ==
=== Key ===
- Q = Qualifier
- WC = Wild card
- LL = Lucky loser
- Alt = Alternate
- SE = Special exempt
- PR = Protected ranking
- ITF = ITF entry
- JE = Junior exempt
- w/o = Walkover
- r = Retired
- d = Defaulted
- SR = Special ranking

=== Finals ===
Semifinals
6	(Argentina) Facundo Bagnis	6	7
(United States) Chase Buchanan	3	5
Q	(Argentina) Renzo Olivo	1	2
2	(Argentina) Federico Delbonis	6	6

Final
6	(Argentina) Facundo Bagnis	4	2
2	(Argentina) Federico Delbonis	6	6

=== Top half ===
First round
1/WC	(United States) T Smyczek	4	2
(Argentina) F Argüello	6	6
Q	(Brazil) R Dutra Silva	5	2
Alt	(Republic of Ireland) J McGee	7	6
(United States) A Krajicek	6	6
(Canada) F Dancevic	4	4
(Germany) A Zverev	6	6^{5}	1
6	(Argentina) F Bagnis	3	7	6
3	(Italy) P Lorenzi	6	6^{4}	3
(United States) B Fratangelo	3	7^{7}	6
WC	(United States) M Mmoh	2	6^{0}
Q	(United States) F Tiafoe	6	7^{7}
(Spain) A Menéndez Maceiras	6	4	3
(United States) C Buchanan	3	6	6
WC	(United States) M Krueger	6	6
5	(Belgium) R Bemelmans	2	2

Second round
(Argentina) F Argüello	1	7	5
Alt	(Republic of Ireland) J McGee	6	5	7
(United States) A Krajicek	3	2
6	(Argentina) F Bagnis	6	6
(United States) B Fratangelo	3	4
Q	(United States) F Tiafoe	6	6
(United States) C Buchanan	6	6
WC	(United States) M Krueger	2	2

Quarterfinals
Alt	(Republic of Ireland) J McGee	1	3
6	(Argentina) F Bagnis	6	6
Q	(United States) F Tiafoe	0	3
(United States) C Buchanan	6	6

Semifinals
6	(Argentina) F Bagnis	6	7
(United States) C Buchanan	3	5

=== Bottom half ===
First round
8	(South Korea) H Chung	3	2
(Argentina) H Zeballos	6	6
(Poland) M Przysiężny	7^{7}	3	1
(Australia) J Kubler	6^{4}	6	6
Q	(Argentina) R Olivo	6	6
LL	(United States) M Russell	3	4
Alt	(United Kingdom) L Broady	6^{2}	1
4	(Colombia) A González	7^{7}	6
7	(Czech Republic) R Štěpánek	3	6^{1}
(United States) J Donaldson	6	7^{7}
(Portugal) G Elias	7^{7}	6
WC	(United States) D Novikov	6^{5}	2
(India) S Devvarman	7	7^{7}
Q	(Germany) M Zverev	5	6^{4}
(Japan) Y Nishioka	4	1
2	(Argentina) F Delbonis	6	6

Second round
(Argentina) H Zeballos	6^{4}	6^{2}
(Australia) J Kubler	7^{7}	7^{7}
Q	(Argentina) R Olivo	6	6
4	(Colombia) A González	3	3
(United States) J Donaldson	6	6
(Portugal) G Elias	2	4
(India) S Devvarman	0	5
2	(Argentina) F Delbonis	6	7

Quarterfinals
(Australia) J Kubler	4	6^{2}
Q	(Argentina) R Olivo	6	7^{7}
(United States) J Donaldson	2	3
2	(Argentina) F Delbonis	6	6

Semifinals
Q	(Argentina) R Olivo	1	2
2	(Argentina) F Delbonis	6	6
