= 2025 Sarasota Open – Doubles =

Doubles
- 2025 Sarasota Open

Final
- Champions: (United States) Robert Cash (United States) JJ Tracy
- Runners-up: (Argentina) Federico Agustín Gómez (Venezuela) Luis David Martínez
- Score: 6–4, 7–6^{(7–3)}

Events
| Singles | Doubles |
| ← 2024 · | Sarasota Open | · 2026 → |

Tristan Boyer and Oliver Crawford were the defending champions but chose not to defend their title.

Robert Cash and JJ Tracy won the title after defeating Federico Agustín Gómez and Luis David Martínez 6–4, 7–6^{(7–3)} in the final.

== Seeds ==
1. (United States) Robert Cash / (United States) JJ Tracy (champions)
2. (Canada) Liam Draxl / (Canada) Cleeve Harper (first round)
3. (Denmark) Johannes Ingildsen / (United Kingdom) David Stevenson (first round)
4. (Australia) Blake Bayldon / (United States) Vasil Kirkov (quarterfinals)

== Draw ==
Key

- Q = Qualifier
- WC = Wild card
- LL = Lucky loser
- Alt = Alternate
- ITF = ITF entry
- PR = Protected ranking
- SR = Special ranking
- SE = Special exempt
- JE = Junior exempt
- JR = Junior Accelerator Programme entrant
- CO = College Accelerator Programme entrant
- NG = Next Gen Accelerator Program entrant
- w/o = Walkover
- r = Retired
- d = Defaulted

=== Draw ===
First round
1 | (United States) R Cash (United States) JJ Tracy | 7 | 6
(France) G Blancaneaux (France) Mathys Erhard | 5 | 4
(United States) G Goldhoff (United States) T Hilderbrand | 7^{7} | 6
WC | (United States) G Johns (United States) Patrick Maloney | 6^{4} | 2
3 | (Denmark) J Ingildsen (United Kingdom) D Stevenson | 6 | 4 | [9]
WC | (United States) M Damm (United States) A Rybakov | 3 | 6 | [11]
(United States) M Krueger (United States) J Sheehy | 6 | 6
(United States) M Cassone (Estonia) M Lajal | 3 | 3
(Argentina) FA Gómez (Venezuela) LD Martínez | 6 | 5 | [10]
(Australia) J Charlton (Australia) P Harper | 4 | 7 | [7]
(Brazil) D Dutra da Silva (Zimbabwe) CJ Lock | 4 | 6^{4}
4 | (Australia) B Bayldon (United States) V Kirkov | 6 | 7^{7}
(Philippines) FC Alcantara (Thailand) P Isaro | 3 | 2
(United States) E Spizzirri (United States) T Zink | 6 | 6
(Chile) T Barrios Vera (Argentina) F Mena | 6^{7} | 6 | [10]
2 | (Canada) L Draxl (Canada) C Harper | 7^{9} | 3 | [8]

Quarterfinals
1 | (United States) R Cash (United States) JJ Tracy | 7 | 7^{7}
(United States) G Goldhoff (United States) T Hilderbrand | 5 | 6^{4}
WC | (United States) M Damm (United States) A Rybakov | 3 | 2
(United States) M Krueger (United States) J Sheehy | 6 | 6
(Argentina) FA Gómez (Venezuela) LD Martínez | 1 | 6 | [10]
4 | (Australia) B Bayldon (United States) V Kirkov | 6 | 1 | [2]
(United States) E Spizzirri (United States) T Zink | 4 | 6 | [10]
(Chile) T Barrios Vera (Argentina) F Mena | 6 | 3 | [7]

Semifinals
1 | (United States) R Cash (United States) JJ Tracy | 7 | 6
(United States) M Krueger (United States) J Sheehy | 5 | 4
(Argentina) FA Gómez (Venezuela) LD Martínez | 3 | 6 | [10]
(United States) E Spizzirri (United States) T Zink | 6 | 3 | [6]

Final
1 | (United States) R Cash (United States) JJ Tracy | 6 | 7^{7}
(Argentina) FA Gómez (Venezuela) LD Martínez | 4 | 6^{3}
