= 2015 Sarasota Open – Doubles =

Doubles
- 2015 Sarasota Open

Final
- Champions: (Argentina) Facundo Argüello (Argentina) Facundo Bagnis
- Runners-up: (South Korea) Chung Hyeon (India) Divij Sharan
- Score: 3–6, 6–2, [13–11]

Events
Singles	Doubles
← 2014 ·	Sarasota Open	· 2016 →

Marin Draganja and Henri Kontinen were the defending champions, but they played in Monte Carlo instead. Facundo Argüello and Facundo Bagnis won the title, defeating Chung Hyeon and Divij Sharan 3–6, 6–2, [13–11] in the final.

== Seeds ==
1. (Philippines) Treat Huey / (United States) Scott Lipsky (quarterfinals)
2. (United States) Austin Krajicek / (United States) Rajeev Ram (first round)
3. (Argentina) Guillermo Durán / (Argentina) Horacio Zeballos (first round)
4. (New Zealand) Marcus Daniell / (Brazil) Marcelo Demoliner (quarterfinals)

== Draw ==
=== Key ===
- Q = Qualifier
- WC = Wild card
- LL = Lucky loser
- Alt = Alternate
- SE = Special exempt
- PR = Protected ranking
- ITF = ITF entry
- JE = Junior exempt
- w/o = Walkover
- r = Retired
- d = Defaulted
- SR = Special ranking

First round
1	(Philippines) T Huey (United States) S Lipsky	7^{7}	6
(United Kingdom) K Skupski (United Kingdom) N Skupski	6^{3}	1
(Belgium) R Bemelmans (United States) J Cerretani	5	6^{3}
(South Korea) H Chung (India) D Sharan	7	7^{7}
4	(New Zealand) M Daniell (Brazil) M Demoliner	6	6
WC	(United States) B Fratangelo (United States) M Krueger	3	2
LL	(India) S Devvarman (India) S Singh	4	4
(United States) D Novikov (United States) T Sandgren	6	6
(Argentina) F Argüello (Argentina) F Bagnis	6	6
WC	(United States) S Kozlov (United States) M Mmoh	3	3
Q	(Portugal) G Elias (Mexico) C Ramírez	7	4	[11]
3	(Argentina) G Durán (Argentina) H Zeballos	5	6	[9]
(Canada) F Dancevic (Germany) F Moser	3	6^{8}
(Sweden) J Brunström (Poland) M Przysiezny	6	7^{10}
(France) F Martin (India) P Raja	7^{7}	3	[11]
2	(United States) A Krajicek (United States) R Ram	6^{3}	6	[9]

Quarterfinals
1	(Philippines) T Huey (United States) S Lipsky	7^{8}	0^{r}
(South Korea) H Chung (India) D Sharan	6^{6}	1
4	(New Zealand) M Daniell (Brazil) M Demoliner	4	4
(United States) D Novikov (United States) T Sandgren	6	6
(Argentina) F Argüello (Argentina) F Bagnis	6	6
Q	(Portugal) G Elias (Mexico) C Ramírez	2	3
(Sweden) J Brunström (Poland) M Przysiezny	6^{6}	6^{8}
(France) F Martin (India) P Raja	7^{8}	7^{10}

Semifinals
(South Korea) H Chung (India) D Sharan	6	6
(United States) D Novikov (United States) T Sandgren	2	4
(Argentina) F Argüello (Argentina) F Bagnis	6	6
(France) F Martin (India) P Raja	4	4

Final
(South Korea) H Chung (India) D Sharan	6	2	[11]
(Argentina) F Argüello (Argentina) F Bagnis	3	6	[13]
