= 2018 Sarasota Open – Doubles =

Doubles
- 2018 Sarasota Open

Final
- Champions: (United States) Evan King (United States) Hunter Reese
- Runners-up: (United States) Christian Harrison (Canada) Peter Polansky
- Score: 6–1, 6–2

Events
Singles	Doubles
← 2017 ·	Sarasota Open	· 2019 →

Scott Lipsky and Jürgen Melzer were the defending champions but only Lipsky chose to defend his title, partnering Donald Young. Lipsky lost in the first round to Christian Harrison and Peter Polansky.

Evan King and Hunter Reese won the title after defeating Harrison and Polansky 6–1, 6–2 in the final.

== Seeds ==
1. (United Kingdom) Ken Skupski / (United Kingdom) Neal Skupski (quarterfinals)
2. (United States) Scott Lipsky / (United States) Donald Young (first round)
3. (Germany) Andre Begemann / (Croatia) Antonio Šančić (semifinals)
4. (India) Jeevan Nedunchezhiyan / (India) Purav Raja (quarterfinals)

== Draw ==
=== Key ===
- Q = Qualifier
- WC = Wild card
- LL = Lucky loser
- Alt = Alternate
- SE = Special exempt
- PR = Protected ranking
- ITF = ITF entry
- JE = Junior exempt
- w/o = Walkover
- r = Retired
- d = Defaulted
- SR = Special ranking

First round
1	(United Kingdom) K Skupski (United Kingdom) N Skupski	6	6
LL	(Argentina) F Coria (Brazil) JP Sorgi	1	4
(United States) E King (United States) H Reese	6	6
WC	(United States) D Baughman (United States) M Mmoh	2	3
4	(India) J Nedunchezhiyan (India) P Raja	6	3	[10]
WC	(United States) R Galloway (United States) M Krueger	3	6	[7]
WC	(Italy) A Arnaboldi (India) Sathi Reddy Chirala	2	1
(United Kingdom) L Bambridge (United Kingdom) J O'Mara	6	6
(Serbia) M Kecmanović (Slovenia) B Rola	3	3
Q	(Uruguay) M Cuevas (Bolivia) H Dellien	6	6
(United States) R Opelka (Australia) M Polmans	7^{7}	3	[4]
3	(Germany) A Begemann (Croatia) A Šančić	6^{5}	6	[10]
(Japan) T Daniel (Spain) E López Pérez	6^{4}	6^{3}
(Brazil) G Clezar (Sweden) A Siljeström	7^{7}	7^{7}
(United States) C Harrison (Canada) P Polansky	1	6	[10]
2	(United States) S Lipsky (United States) D Young	6	3	[5]

Quarterfinals
1	(United Kingdom) K Skupski (United Kingdom) N Skupski	6	6^{1}	[7]
(United States) E King (United States) H Reese	4	7^{7}	[10]
4	(India) J Nedunchezhiyan (India) P Raja	5	2
(United Kingdom) L Bambridge (United Kingdom) J O'Mara	7	6
Q	(Uruguay) M Cuevas (Bolivia) H Dellien	1	6	[7]
3	(Germany) A Begemann (Croatia) A Šančić	6	3	[10]
(Brazil) G Clezar (Sweden) A Siljeström	6^{5}	3
(United States) C Harrison (Canada) P Polansky	7^{7}	6

Semifinals
(United States) E King (United States) H Reese	6	7
(United Kingdom) L Bambridge (United Kingdom) J O'Mara	4	5
3	(Germany) A Begemann (Croatia) A Šančić	7	3	[5]
(United States) C Harrison (Canada) P Polansky	5	6	[10]

Final
(United States) E King (United States) H Reese	6	6
(United States) C Harrison (Canada) P Polansky	1	2
