= 2011 Sarasota Open =

- Date: April 23 – May 1, 2011
- Edition: 3rd
- Location: Longboat Key, Florida, United States

Champions

Singles
- (United States) James Blake

Doubles
- (Australia) Ashley Fisher / (Australia) Stephen Huss
← 2010 ·	Sarasota Open	· 2012 →

The 2011 Sarasota Open was a professional tennis tournament played on outdoor green clay courts. It was part of the 2011 ATP Challenger Tour. It took place in Longboat Key, Florida, United States between April 23 and May 1, 2011.

== Entrants ==
=== Seeds ===
Nationality	Player	Ranking*	Seeding
USA	Ryan Sweeting	67	1
USA	Michael Russell	90	2
JPN	Go Soeda	91	3
USA	Donald Young	98	4
ARG	Brian Dabul	106	5
USA	Alex Bogomolov Jr.	108	6
FRA	Éric Prodon	119	7
USA	Ryan Harrison	129	8

- Rankings are as of April 18, 2011.

=== Other entrants ===
The following players received wildcards into the singles main draw:

- (India) Vamsee Chappidi
- (United States) Andrea Collarini
- (United States) Lester Cook
- (United States) Mac Styslinger

The following players received entry from the qualifying draw:

- (Canada) Philip Bester
- (Canada) Pierre-Ludovic Duclos
- (United States) Wayne Odesnik
- (United Kingdom) Morgan Phillips

== Champions ==
=== Singles ===
(United States) James Blake def. (United States) Alex Bogomolov Jr., 6–2, 6–2

=== Doubles ===
(Australia) Ashley Fisher / (Australia) Stephen Huss def. (United States) Alex Bogomolov Jr. / (United States) Alex Kuznetsov, 6–3, 6–4
