= 2022 Sarasota Open – Singles =

Singles
- 2022 Sarasota Open

Final
- Champion: (Colombia) Daniel Elahi Galán
- Runner-up: (United States) Steve Johnson
- Score: 7–6^{(9–7)}, 4–6, 6–1

Events
Singles	Doubles
← 2019 ·	Sarasota Open	· 2023 →

Tommy Paul was the defending champion but chose not to defend his title.

Daniel Elahi Galán won the title after defeating Steve Johnson 7–6^{(9–7)}, 4–6, 6–1 in the final.

== Seeds ==
1. (United States) Denis Kudla (semifinals)
2. (Australia) Jordan Thompson (withdrew)
3. (Chile) Alejandro Tabilo (semifinals)
4. (United States) Steve Johnson (final)
5. (Colombia) Daniel Elahi Galán (champion)
6. (Argentina) Juan Ignacio Londero (first round, retired)
7. (United States) Jack Sock (quarterfinals)
8. (Chile) Tomás Barrios Vera (second round)

== Draw ==
=== Key ===
- Q = Qualifier
- WC = Wild card
- LL = Lucky loser
- Alt = Alternate
- SE = Special exempt
- PR = Protected ranking
- ITF = ITF entry
- JE = Junior exempt
- w/o = Walkover
- r = Retired
- d = Defaulted
- SR = Special ranking

=== Finals ===
Semifinals
1	(United States) Denis Kudla	2	5
4	(United States) Steve Johnson	6	7
3	(Chile) Alejandro Tabilo	6^{3}	1
5	(Colombia) Daniel Elahi Galán	7^{7}	6

Final
4	(United States) Steve Johnson	6^{7}	6	1
5	(Colombia) Daniel Elahi Galán	7^{9}	4	6

=== Top half ===
First round
1	(United States) D Kudla	4	6	6
(India) P Gunneswaran	6	4	2
WC	(United States) M Mmoh	6	6
PR	(Australia) A Harris	3	3
Q	(Netherlands) G Brouwer	6^{4}	6	6
LL	(Denmark) M Torpegaard	7^{7}	4	1
Q	(United States) C Harrison	4	4
7	(United States) J Sock	6	6
4	(United States) S Johnson	6	6
(Argentina) A Collarini	3	4
Alt	(Japan) Yo Watanuki	6	6
(Chinese Taipei) J Jung	2	2
Alt	(United States) N Moreno de Alboran	3	2
(United States) M Krueger	6	6
WC	(United States) G Nanda	2	1
8	(Chile) T Barrios Vera	6	6

Second round
1	(United States) D Kudla	6	1	6
WC	(United States) M Mmoh	2	6	3
Q	(Netherlands) G Brouwer	1	2
7	(United States) J Sock	6	6
4	(United States) S Johnson	3	6	6
Alt	(Japan) Yo Watanuki	6	4	1
(United States) M Krueger	6	7^{7}
8	(Chile) T Barrios Vera	4	6^{3}

Quarterfinals
1	(United States) D Kudla	7	6
7	(United States) J Sock	5	1
4	(United States) S Johnson	7^{7}	3	6
(United States) M Krueger	6^{4}	6	3

Semifinals
1	(United States) D Kudla	2	5
4	(United States) S Johnson	6	7

=== Bottom half ===
First round
6	(Argentina) JI Londero	3	0^{r}
Q	(Canada) A Galarneau	6	1
(United States) J. J. Wolf	6	6^{8}	6
Q	(United States) A Kovacevic	2	7^{10}	3
(United States) T Sandgren	5	3
(Switzerland) A Ritschard	7	6
LL	(United States) A Rybakov	3	4
3	(Chile) A Tabilo	6	6
5	(Colombia) DE Galán	7	7^{7}
LL	(Australia) M Purcell	5	6^{4}
(Australia) J Kubler	4	6	6
(India) S Nagal	6	2	3
WC	(United States) R Harrison	6	2	0^{r}
Q	(Bulgaria) A Andreev	3	6	2
Alt	(Chinese Taipei) T-l Wu	7^{7}	3	6
Q	(Australia) R Hijikata	6^{4}	6	4

Second round
Q	(Canada) A Galarneau	1	2
(United States) J. J. Wolf	6	6
(Switzerland) A Ritschard	3	4
3	(Chile) A Tabilo	6	6
5	(Colombia) DE Galán	6	4	6
(Australia) J Kubler	3	6	3
Q	(Bulgaria) A Andreev	6	1	7^{7}
Alt	(Chinese Taipei) T-l Wu	4	6	6^{4}

Quarterfinals
(United States) J. J. Wolf	1	4
3	(Chile) A Tabilo	6	6
5	(Colombia) DE Galán	2
Q	(Bulgaria) A Andreev	0^{r}

Semifinals
3	(Chile) A Tabilo	6^{3}	1
5	(Colombia) DE Galán	7^{7}	6
