= 2013 Sarasota Open – Doubles =

Doubles
- 2013 Sarasota Open

Final
- Champions: (Serbia) Ilija Bozoljac (India) Somdev Devvarman
- Runners-up: (United States) Steve Johnson (United States) Bradley Klahn
- Score: 6–7^{(5–7)}, 7–6^{(7–3)}, [11–9]

Events
Singles	Doubles
← 2012 ·	Sarasota Open	· 2014 →

Johan Brunström and Izak van der Merwe were the defending champions but van der Merwe decided not to participate.
Brunström paired up with Eric Butorac, but they lost to Steve Johnson and Bradley Klahn in the first round.
Ilija Bozoljac and Somdev Devvarman defeated Johnson and Klahn in the final 6–7^{(5–7)}, 7–6^{(7–3)}, [11–9] to win the title.

== Seeds ==
1. (Sweden) Johan Brunström / (United States) Eric Butorac (first round)
2. (United Kingdom) Jamie Murray / (Australia) John Peers (first round)
3. (United States) Nicholas Monroe / (Germany) Simon Stadler (semifinals)
4. (Germany) Benjamin Becker / (Italy) Stefano Ianni (quarterfinals)

== Draw ==
=== Key ===
- Q = Qualifier
- WC = Wild card
- LL = Lucky loser
- Alt = Alternate
- SE = Special exempt
- PR = Protected ranking
- ITF = ITF entry
- JE = Junior exempt
- w/o = Walkover
- r = Retired
- d = Defaulted
- SR = Special ranking

=== Draw ===
First round
1	(Sweden) J Brunström (United States) E Butorac	5	3
(United States) S Johnson (United States) B Klahn	7	6
(United States) J Sock (China) Z Zhang	6^{3}	1
(United States) T Sandgren (United States) R Williams	7^{7}	6
4	(Germany) B Becker (Italy) S Ianni	7^{7}	6
WC	(United States) B Fratangelo (United States) M Krueger	6^{5}	4
(Russia) T Gabashvili (Ukraine) D Molchanov	5	7	[6]
WC	(United States) A Kuznetsov (Germany) M Zverev	7	5	[10]
WC	(United States) Terrell Celestine (India) Siddhartha Chappidi	0	4
(Canada) J Levine (Spain) A Menéndez-Maceiras	6	6
(Argentina) M Alund (Argentina) G Pella	4	4
3	(United States) N Monroe (Germany) S Stadler	6	6
(United States) M Russell (United States) T Smyczek	6^{1}	3
(Russia) A Bogomolov Jr. (Germany) C-M Stebe	7^{7}	6
Q	(Serbia) I Bozoljac (India) S Devvarman	3	6	[10]
2	(United Kingdom) J Murray (Australia) J Peers	6	1	[4]

Quarterfinals
(United States) S Johnson (United States) B Klahn	6^{5}	6	[10]
(United States) T Sandgren (United States) R Williams	7^{7}	4	[4]
4	(Germany) B Becker (Italy) S Ianni	2	6	[3]
WC	(United States) A Kuznetsov (Germany) M Zverev	6	3	[10]
(Canada) J Levine (Spain) A Menéndez-Maceiras	6^{5}	4
3	(United States) N Monroe (Germany) S Stadler	7^{7}	6
(Russia) A Bogomolov Jr. (Germany) C-M Stebe	3	4
Q	(Serbia) I Bozoljac (India) S Devvarman	6	6

Semifinals
(United States) S Johnson (United States) B Klahn	5	6	[10]
WC	(United States) A Kuznetsov (Germany) M Zverev	7	4	[6]
3	(United States) N Monroe (Germany) S Stadler	4	1
Q	(Serbia) I Bozoljac (India) S Devvarman	6	6

Final
(United States) S Johnson (United States) B Klahn	7^{7}	6^{3}	[9]
Q	(Serbia) I Bozoljac (India) S Devvarman	6^{5}	7^{7}	[11]
