= 2015 Sarasota Open =

- Date: 11–19 April
- Edition: 7th
- Draw: 32S / 16D
- Prize money: $100,000
- Surface: Green clay
- Location: Sarasota, Florida, United States

Champions

Singles
- (Argentina) Federico Delbonis

Doubles
- (Argentina) Facundo Argüello / (Argentina) Facundo Bagnis
← 2014 ·	Sarasota Open	· 2016 →

The 2015 Sarasota Open was a professional tennis tournament played on clay courts. It was the 7th edition of the tournament which was part of the 2015 ATP Challenger Tour. It took place in Sarasota, Florida, United States between April 11 and April 19, 2015.

== Singles main-draw entrants ==
=== Seeds ===
Country	Player	Rank^{1}	Seed
USA	Tim Smyczek	68	1
ARG	Federico Delbonis	72	2
ITA	Paolo Lorenzi	83	3
COL	Alejandro González	100	4
BEL	Ruben Bemelmans	102	5
ARG	Facundo Bagnis	103	6
CZE	Radek Štěpánek	110	7
KOR	Chung Hyeon	118	8

- ^{1} Rankings are as of April 6, 2015

=== Other entrants ===
The following players received wildcards into the singles main draw:

- (United States) Tim Smyczek
- (United States) Michael Mmoh
- (United States) Mitchell Krueger
- (United States) Dennis Novikov

The following players received entry into the singles main draw as alternates:

- (United Kingdom) Liam Broady
- (Republic of Ireland) James McGee

The following players received entry from the qualifying draw:

- (United States) Frances Tiafoe
- (Germany) Mischa Zverev
- (Argentina) Renzo Olivo
- (Brazil) Rogério Dutra Silva

The following player received entry into the singles main draw as a lucky loser:

- (United States) Michael Russell

== Champions ==
=== Singles ===
- (Argentina) Federico Delbonis def. (Argentina) Facundo Bagnis, 6–4, 6–2

=== Doubles ===
- (Argentina) Facundo Argüello / (Argentina) Facundo Bagnis def. (South Korea) Chung Hyeon / (India) Divij Sharan, 3–6, 6–2, [13–11]
