= 2009 All Star Children's Foundation Sarasota Open – Doubles =

Doubles
- 2009 All Star Children's Foundation Sarasota Open

Final
- Champions: (Dominican Republic) Víctor Estrella (Mexico) Santiago González
- Runners-up: (India) Harsh Mankad (United States) Kaes Van't Hof
- Score: 6–2, 6–4

Events
Singles	Doubles
← 2008 ·	All Star Children's Foundation Sarasota Open	· 2010 →

Víctor Estrella and Santiago González became the first champions of this tournament, after their won 6–2, 6–4 against Harsh Mankad and Kaes Van't Hof in the final.

== Seeds ==
1. (Australia) Carsten Ball / (United States) Travis Rettenmaier (semifinals)
2. (Dominican Republic) Víctor Estrella / (Mexico) Santiago González (champions)
3. (India) Harsh Mankad / (United States) Kaes Van't Hof (final)
4. (United States) Lester Cook / (United States) Michael Yani (semifinals)

== Draw ==
=== Key ===
- Q = Qualifier
- WC = Wild card
- LL = Lucky loser
- Alt = Alternate
- SE = Special exempt
- PR = Protected ranking
- ITF = ITF entry
- JE = Junior exempt
- w/o = Walkover
- r = Retired
- d = Defaulted
- SR = Special ranking

=== Draw ===
First round
1	(Australia) C Ball (United States) T Rettenmaier	4	7	[10]
(United States) R DeHeart (Philippines) TC Huey	6	5	[8]
(United States) S Bass (United States) C Klingemann	6	6
WC	(United States) V Chappidi (Romania) A Iordachescu	2	1
3	(India) H Mankad (United States) K Van't Hof	6	6
(Serbia) V Obradovic (Czech Republic) A Vejmělka	3	2
WC	(United States) G Gehrke (United Kingdom) J Ward	3	2
Q	(United States) T Braswell (United States) D Myers	6	6
WC	(United States) R Borvanov (United States) R Harrison	2	4
(Venezuela) J de Armas (Mexico) B Echagaray	6	6
(Romania) G Moraru (Sweden) M Ryderstedt	6^{6}	4
4	(United States) L Cook (United States) M Yani	7	6
(United States) A Kuznetsov (United States) P Simmonds	5	6	[10]
(Italy) E Burzi (France) J Dasnières de Veigy	7	3	[8]
(United States) B Battistone (Romania) R Luchici	2	4
2	(Dominican Republic) V Estrella (Mexico) S González	6	6

Quarterfinals
1	(Australia) C Ball (United States) T Rettenmaier	4	6	[10]
(United States) S Bass (United States) C Klingemann	6	1	[2]
3	(India) H Mankad (United States) K Van't Hof	6	7
Q	(United States) T Braswell (United States) D Myers	3	6^{3}
(Venezuela) J de Armas (Mexico) B Echagaray	5	1
4	(United States) L Cook (United States) M Yani	7	6
(United States) A Kuznetsov (United States) P Simmonds	1	2
2	(Dominican Republic) V Estrella (Mexico) S González	6	6

Semifinals
1	(Australia) C Ball (United States) T Rettenmaier	6	3	[5]
3	(India) H Mankad (United States) K Van't Hof	2	6	[10]
4	(United States) L Cook (United States) M Yani	6^{6}	4
2	(Dominican Republic) V Estrella (Mexico) S González	7	6

Finals
3	(India) H Mankad (United States) K Van't Hof	2	4
2	(Dominican Republic) V Estrella (Mexico) S González	6	6
