= 2011 Sarasota Open – Singles =

Singles
- 2011 Sarasota Open

Final
- Champion: (United States) James Blake
- Runner-up: (United States) Alex Bogomolov Jr.
- Score: 6–2, 6–2

Events
Singles	Doubles
← 2010 ·	Sarasota Open	· 2012 →

Kei Nishikori was the defending champion but chose not to participate.
James Blake defeated Alex Bogomolov Jr. in the final (6–2, 6–2) to win the title.

== Seeds ==
1. (United States) Ryan Sweeting (semifinals)
2. (United States) Michael Russell (quarterfinals)
3. (Japan) Go Soeda (second round)
4. (United States) Donald Young (second round)
5. (Argentina) Brian Dabul (first round, retired due to fatigue)
6. (United States) Alex Bogomolov Jr. (final)
7. (France) Éric Prodon (quarterfinals, withdrew due to an abdominal strain)
8. (United States) Ryan Harrison (first round)

== Draw ==
=== Key ===
- Q = Qualifier
- WC = Wild card
- LL = Lucky loser
- Alt = Alternate
- SE = Special exempt
- PR = Protected ranking
- ITF = ITF entry
- JE = Junior exempt
- w/o = Walkover
- r = Retired
- d = Defaulted
- SR = Special ranking

=== Finals ===
Semifinals
1	(United States) Ryan Sweeting	2	6^{15}
(United States) James Blake	6	7
(Canada) Frank Dancevic	6	4	2
6	(United States) Alex Bogomolov Jr.	3	6	6

Final
(United States) James Blake	6	6
6	(United States) Alex Bogomolov Jr.	2	2

=== Top half ===
First round
1	(United States) R Sweeting	6	6
WC	(United States) L Cook	2	0
(Argentina) JP Brzezicki	6	6
(South Africa) I van der Merwe	2	4
(Japan) Y Sugita	6	6
WC	(United States) M Styslinger	2	2
(Slovenia) G Žemlja	1	7
5	(Argentina) B Dabul	6	6^{7}	^{r}
4	(United States) D Young	6	3
(Ecuador) G Lapentti	2	1^{r}
(United States) J Blake	6	7
(Australia) M Matosevic	3	6^{2}
Q	(Canada) P Bester	4	6	6
Q	(United Kingdom) Morgan Phillips	6	4	4
(South Africa) R de Voest	4	4
7	(France) É Prodon	6	6

Second round
1	(United States) R Sweeting	6	2	6
(Argentina) JP Brzezicki	4	6	4
(Japan) Y Sugita	4	4
(Slovenia) G Žemlja	6	6
4	(United States) D Young	6^{3}	5
(United States) J Blake	7	7
Q	(Canada) P Bester	4	2
7	(France) É Prodon	6	6

Quarterfinals
1	(United States) R Sweeting	4	6	6
(Slovenia) G Žemlja	6	2	4
(United States) J Blake
7	(France) É Prodon	w/o

Semifinals
1	(United States) R Sweeting	2	6^{15}
(United States) J Blake	6	7

=== Bottom half ===
First round
8	(United States) R Harrison	5	3
PR	(Bosnia and Herzegovina) A Delić	7	6
Q	(Canada) P-L Duclos	6	6^{3}	6
WC	(United States) A Collarini	2	7	4
(Republic of Ireland) C Niland	4	6	1
(Canada) F Dancevic	6	4	6
(United States) T Smyczek	5	6	6^{5}
3	(Japan) G Soeda	7	4	7
6	(United States) A Bogomolov Jr.	6	6
WC	(India) Vamsee Chappidi	1	0
(United States) A Kuznetsov	6	7
(South Africa) F Wolmarans	4	6^{4}
Q	(United States) W Odesnik	6	2	2
(United Kingdom) J Ward	3	6	6
Alt	(United States) J Witten	7	0	5
2	(United States) M Russell	6^{5}	6	7

Second round
PR	(Bosnia and Herzegovina) A Delić	6	4	2
Q	(Canada) P-L Duclos	3	6	6
(Canada) F Dancevic	2	6	6
3	(Japan) G Soeda	6	3	1
6	(United States) A Bogomolov Jr.	6	6
(United States) A Kuznetsov	2	1
(United Kingdom) J Ward	3	3
2	(United States) M Russell	6	6

Quarterfinals
Q	(Canada) P-L Duclos	4	1
(Canada) F Dancevic	6	6
6	(United States) A Bogomolov Jr.	6	6
2	(United States) M Russell	1	4

Semifinals
(Canada) F Dancevic	6	4	2
6	(United States) A Bogomolov Jr.	3	6	6
