= 2012 Sarasota Open – Singles =

Singles
- 2012 Sarasota Open

Final
- Champion: (United States) Sam Querrey
- Runner-up: (Italy) Paolo Lorenzi
- Score: 6–1, 6–7^{(3–7)}, 6–3

Events
Singles	Doubles
← 2011 ·	Sarasota Open	· 2013 →

James Blake was the defending champion.
Sam Querrey won the final after defeating Paolo Lorenzi 6–1, 6–7^{(3–7)}, 6–3 in the final.

== Seeds ==
1. (United States) James Blake (quarterfinals)
2. (Japan) Go Soeda (second round)
3. (Germany) Björn Phau (first round)
4. (Canada) Vasek Pospisil (second round)
5. (Italy) Paolo Lorenzi (final)
6. (United States) Sam Querrey (champion)
7. (United States) Wayne Odesnik (semifinals)
8. (Spain) Rubén Ramírez Hidalgo (first round)

== Draw ==
=== Key ===
- Q = Qualifier
- WC = Wild card
- LL = Lucky loser
- Alt = Alternate
- SE = Special exempt
- PR = Protected ranking
- ITF = ITF entry
- JE = Junior exempt
- w/o = Walkover
- r = Retired
- d = Defaulted
- SR = Special ranking

=== Finals ===
Semifinals
5	(Italy) Paolo Lorenzi	6	3	6
7	(United States) Wayne Odesnik	2	6	3
(United States) Michael Russell	3	6	3
6	(United States) Sam Querrey	6	3	6

Final
5	(Italy) Paolo Lorenzi	1	7^{7}	3
6	(United States) Sam Querrey	6	6^{3}	6

=== Top half ===
First round
1/WC	(United States) J Blake	6	6
WC	(United States) M Styslinger	4	2
Alt	(Germany) M Zverev	6	2	2
(United States) D Kudla	3	6	6
(Czech Republic) J Hernych	6	7^{7}
(South Africa) I van der Merwe	4	6^{4}
Q	(Switzerland) M Lammer	3	1
5	(Italy) P Lorenzi	6	6
4	(Canada) V Pospisil	4	6	7^{7}
(United States) R Ginperi	6	1	6^{3}
(France) É Prodon	7^{7}	7
(France) A Gensse	6^{3}	5
WC	(United States) T Smyczek	6^{4}	6	7^{8}
(Australia) M Matosevic	7^{7}	4	6^{6}
Q	(United States) N Monroe	4	7^{7}	1
7	(United States) W Odesnik	6	6^{1}	6

Second round
1/WC	(United States) J Blake	5	7	7
(United States) D Kudla	7	5	5
(Czech Republic) J Hernych	6^{4}	3
5	(Italy) P Lorenzi	7^{7}	6
4	(Canada) V Pospisil	5	4
(France) É Prodon	7	6
WC	(United States) T Smyczek	3	3
7	(United States) W Odesnik	6	6

Quarterfinals
1/WC	(United States) J Blake	3	2
5	(Italy) P Lorenzi	6	6
(France) É Prodon	7	4	2
7	(United States) W Odesnik	5	6	6

Semifinals
5	(Italy) P Lorenzi	6	3	6
7	(United States) W Odesnik	2	6	3

=== Bottom half ===
First round
8	(Spain) R Ramírez Hidalgo	4	3
(United States) M Russell	6	6
LL	(Bosnia and Herzegovina) A Delić	1	1
Alt	(United States) A Kuznetsov	6	6
WC	(United States) R Williams	3	4
(Russia) T Gabashvili	6	6
(United States) B Reynolds	7^{7}	6
3	(Germany) B Phau	6^{5}	3
6	(United States) S Querrey	3	6	6
(Argentina) H Zeballos	6	4	1
Q	(United States) B Baker	6	2
(United States) R Sweeting	1	0r
(United States) M Yani	4	6	6
Q	(Romania) C Gârd	6	1	2
(United States) J Levine	6^{4}	6	6^{5}
2	(Japan) G Soeda	7^{7}	2	7^{7}

Second round
(United States) M Russell	7^{7}	6
Alt	(United States) A Kuznetsov	6^{1}	4
(Russia) T Gabashvili	6	2	7
(United States) B Reynolds	3	6	5
6	(United States) S Querrey	6	1	6
Q	(United States) B Baker	3	6	3
(United States) M Yani	6	6
2	(Japan) G Soeda	3	4

Quarterfinals
(United States) M Russell	7	3	6
(Russia) T Gabashvili	5	6	1
6	(United States) S Querrey	6	6
(United States) M Yani	3	1

Semifinals
(United States) M Russell	3	6	3
6	(United States) S Querrey	6	3	6
