= 2018 Sarasota Open =

Tennis tournament

- Date: 16–22 April
- Edition: 10th
- Draw: 32S / 16D
- Surface: Green clay
- Location: Sarasota, Florida, United States

Champions

Singles
- (Bolivia) Hugo Dellien

Doubles
- (United States) Evan King / (United States) Hunter Reese
← 2017 ·	Sarasota Open	· 2019 →

The 2018 Sarasota Open was a professional tennis tournament played on clay courts. It was the 10th edition of the tournament which was part of the 2018 ATP Challenger Tour. It took place in Sarasota, Florida, United States between April 16 and April 22, 2018.

== Singles main-draw entrants ==
=== Seeds ===
Country	Player	Rank^{1}	Seed
JPN	Taro Daniel	111	1
CAN	Peter Polansky	126	2
USA	Donald Young	130	3
USA	Mackenzie McDonald	142	4
SUI	Henri Laaksonen	143	5
BRA	Thomaz Bellucci	144	6
USA	Michael Mmoh	149	7
SLO	Blaž Rola	166	8

- ^{1} Rankings are as of April 9, 2018.

=== Other entrants ===
The following players received wildcards into the singles main draw:

- (United States) JC Aragone
- (United States) Sebastian Korda
- (United States) Mackenzie McDonald
- (United States) Tyler Zink

The following players received entry into the singles main draw as special exempts:

- (Argentina) Facundo Argüello
- (Argentina) Juan Ignacio Londero

The following players received entry from the qualifying draw:

- (United Kingdom) Jay Clarke
- (Argentina) Federico Coria
- (Canada) Frank Dancevic
- (Japan) Kaichi Uchida

The following player received entry as a lucky loser:

- (Germany) Jan Choinski

== Champions ==
=== Singles ===
- (Bolivia) Hugo Dellien def. (Argentina) Facundo Bagnis 2–6, 6–4, 6–2.

=== Doubles ===
- (United States) Evan King / (United States) Hunter Reese def. (United States) Christian Harrison / (Canada) Peter Polansky 6–1, 6–2.
