= 2022 Sarasota Open – Doubles =

Doubles
- 2022 Sarasota Open

Final
- Champions: (United States) Robert Galloway (United States) Jackson Withrow
- Runners-up: (Sweden) André Göransson (United States) Nathaniel Lammons
- Score: 6–3, 7–6^{(7–3)}

Events
Singles	Doubles
← 2019 ·	Sarasota Open	· 2023 →

Martín Cuevas and Paolo Lorenzi were the defending champions but chose not to defend their title.

Robert Galloway and Jackson Withrow won the title after defeating André Göransson and Nathaniel Lammons 6–3, 7–6^{(7–3)} in the final.

== Seeds ==
1. (Australia) Luke Saville / (Australia) John-Patrick Smith (semifinals)
2. (Sweden) André Göransson / (United States) Nathaniel Lammons (final)
3. (United States) Robert Galloway / (United States) Jackson Withrow (champions)
4. (Ecuador) Diego Hidalgo / (Colombia) Cristian Rodríguez (first round)

== Draw ==
=== Key ===
- Q = Qualifier
- WC = Wild card
- LL = Lucky loser
- Alt = Alternate
- SE = Special exempt
- PR = Protected ranking
- ITF = ITF entry
- JE = Junior exempt
- w/o = Walkover
- r = Retired
- d = Defaulted
- SR = Special ranking

First round
1	(Australia) L Saville (Australia) J-P Smith	6	6^{4}	[10]
(Chinese Taipei) J Jung (United States) D Novikov	4	7^{7}	[7]
Alt	(Brazil) D Dutra da Silva (Dominican Republic) N Hardt	4	4
(United States) W Blumberg (United States) M Schnur	6	6
3	(United States) R Galloway (United States) J Withrow	6	7
(United States) T Sandgren (Denmark) M Torpegaard	2	5
(Chile) T Barrios Vera (Chile) A Tabilo	7^{8}	6
(Philippines) T Huey (United States) M Krueger	6^{6}	2
PR	(India) Y Bhambri (India) S Myneni	6	7^{7}
WC	(United States) M Damm (United States) A Rybakov	2	6^{4}
(United States) A Lawson (United States) R Stalder	6^{6}	6	[10]
4	(Ecuador) D Hidalgo (Colombia) C Rodríguez	7^{8}	3	[8]
PR	(Australia) A Harris (Australia) J Kubler	4	2
(Netherlands) G Brouwer (India) J Nedunchezhiyan	6	6
WC	(United States) J Cerretani (United States) C Harrison	2	4
2	(Sweden) A Göransson (United States) N Lammons	6	6

Quarterfinals
1	(Australia) L Saville (Australia) J-P Smith	6	6
(United States) W Blumberg (United States) M Schnur	4	3
3	(United States) R Galloway (United States) J Withrow	6	6
(Chile) T Barrios Vera (Chile) A Tabilo	3	4
PR	(India) Y Bhambri (India) S Myneni	6^{3}	6	[7]
(United States) A Lawson (United States) R Stalder	7^{7}	3	[10]
(Netherlands) G Brouwer (India) J Nedunchezhiyan	2	4
2	(Sweden) A Göransson (United States) N Lammons	6	6

Semifinals
1	(Australia) L Saville (Australia) J-P Smith	4	4
3	(United States) R Galloway (United States) J Withrow	6	6
(United States) A Lawson (United States) R Stalder	6^{4}	3
2	(Sweden) A Göransson (United States) N Lammons	7^{7}	6

Final
3	(United States) R Galloway (United States) J Withrow	6	7^{7}
2	(Sweden) A Göransson (United States) N Lammons	3	6^{3}
