= 2009 All Star Children's Foundation Sarasota Open – Singles =

Singles
- 2009 All Star Children's Foundation Sarasota Open

Final
- Champion: (United Kingdom) James Ward
- Runner-up: (Australia) Carsten Ball
- Score: 7–6(4), 4–6, 6–3

Events
Singles	Doubles
← 2008 ·	All Star Children's Foundation Sarasota Open	· 2010 →

James Ward won in the final 7–6(4), 4–6, 6–3, against Carsten Ball.

== Seeds ==
1. (United States) ~~Kevin Kim~~ (withdrew)
2. (United States) Vince Spadea (second round, retired)
3. (United States) Donald Young (second round)
4. (Australia) Carsten Ball (final)
5. (Belgium) Xavier Malisse (semifinals)
6. (United States) Scoville Jenkins (second round, retired)
7. (United States) Michael Russell (quarterfinals)
8. (Mexico) Santiago González (first round)

== Draw ==
=== Key ===
- Q = Qualifier
- WC = Wild card
- LL = Lucky loser
- Alt = Alternate
- SE = Special exempt
- PR = Protected ranking
- ITF = ITF entry
- JE = Junior exempt
- w/o = Walkover
- r = Retired
- d = Defaulted
- SR = Special ranking

=== Final four ===
Semifinals
5	(Belgium) Xavier Malisse	2	3
4	(Australia) Carsten Ball	6	6
(United States) Michael Yani	2	6	6^{5}
Q	(United Kingdom) James Ward	6	3	7

Final
4	(Australia) Carsten Ball	6^{4}	6	3
Q	(United Kingdom) James Ward	7	4	6

=== Top half ===
First round
ALT	(Dominican Republic) V Estrella	6	3	7
(Peru) I Miranda	3	6	5
WC	(United States) R Harrison	7	3	6
(United States) T Dent	5	6	1
(Mexico) B Echagaray	6	6
(Czech Republic) A Vejmělka	1	2
(United States) L Cook	5	3
5	(United States) X Malisse	7	6
4	(Australia) C Ball	6	4	7
(Argentina) M Zabaleta	4	6	6^{5}
WC	(United States) S Bass	6^{5}	6	6
WC	(United States) C Klingemann	7	3	1
Q	(South Africa) F Wolmarans	6	3	4
(France) É Prodon	3	6	6
SE	(United States) A Kuznetsov	6	6
8	(Mexico) S González	2	1

Second round
(Dominican Republic) V Estrella	6	5	4
WC	(United States) R Harrison	2	7	6
(Mexico) B Echagaray	4	1
5	(United States) X Malisse	6	6
4	(Australia) C Ball	7	3	6
WC	(United States) S Bass	6^{5}	6	4
(France) É Prodon	6	6
SE	(United States) A Kuznetsov	2	4

Quarterfinals
WC	(United States) R Harrison	1	3
5	(United States) X Malisse	6	6
4	(Australia) C Ball	6	7
(France) É Prodon	4	6^{5}

Semifinals
5	(United States) X Malisse	2	3
4	(Australia) C Ball	6	6

=== Bottom half ===
First round
7	(United States) M Russell	3	6	6
(Romania) G Moraru	6	4	2
(Italy) E Burzi	6	7
(United States) R DeHeart	4	5
Q	(Australia) B Tomic	4	6	6^{2}
(United States) M Yani	6	3	7
WC	(United States) J Witten	5	6^{2}
3	(United States) D Young	7	7
6	(United States) S Jenkins	6	7
LL	(Argentina) N Todero	2	6^{3}
(Venezuela) J de Armas	4	5
(France) J Dasnières de Veigy	6	7
(Sweden) M Ryderstedt	4	3
Q	(United Kingdom) J Ward	6	6
Q	(Lithuania) R Berankis	7	4	3
2	(United States) V Spadea	6^{3}	6	6

Second round
7	(United States) M Russell	6	6
(Italy) E Burzi	2	0
(United States) M Yani	6	6
3	(United States) D Young	4	4
6	(United States) S Jenkins	4	1	r
(France) J Dasnières de Veigy	6	2
Q	(United Kingdom) J Ward	6	5
2	(United States) V Spadea	0	2	r

Quarterfinals
7	(United States) M Russell	5	7	3
(United States) M Yani	7	6^{5}	6
(France) J Dasnières de Veigy	6	1	4
Q	(United Kingdom) J Ward	3	6	6

Semifinals
(United States) M Yani	2	6	6^{5}
Q	(United Kingdom) J Ward	6	3	7
