= 2013 Sarasota Open – Singles =

Singles
- 2013 Sarasota Open

Final
- Champion: (United States) Alex Kuznetsov
- Runner-up: (United States) Wayne Odesnik
- Score: 6–0, 6–2

Events
Singles	Doubles
← 2012 ·	Sarasota Open	· 2014 →

Sam Querrey was the defending champion, but chose not to compete.
Alex Kuznetsov defeated Wayne Odesnik 6–0, 6–2 in the final to win the title.

== Seeds ==
1. (United States) Michael Russell (first round)
2. (United States) Ryan Harrison (first round)
3. (Argentina) Martín Alund (first round)
4. (Germany) Benjamin Becker (first round)
5. (Canada) Jesse Levine (first round)
6. (Argentina) Guido Pella (quarterfinals)
7. (United States) Jack Sock (first round, retired)
8. (United States) Wayne Odesnik (final)

== Draw ==
=== Key ===
- Q = Qualifier
- WC = Wild card
- LL = Lucky loser
- Alt = Alternate
- SE = Special exempt
- PR = Protected ranking
- ITF = ITF entry
- JE = Junior exempt
- w/o = Walkover
- r = Retired
- d = Defaulted
- SR = Special ranking

=== Finals ===
Semifinals
Alt	(India) Somdev Devvarman	6	1	3
Q	(United States) Alex Kuznetsov	3	6	6
Alt	(Ukraine) Denys Molchanov	6^{1}	7^{7}	1
8	(United States) Wayne Odesnik	7^{7}	6^{1}	6

Final
Q	(United States) Alex Kuznetsov	6	6
8	(United States) Wayne Odesnik	0	2

=== Top half ===
First round
1	(United States) M Russell	0	3
(Germany) M Zverev	6	6
WC	(United Kingdom) K Edmund	3	4
(United Kingdom) J Ward	6	6
Q	(South Korea) Y-k Lim	3	6	4
Q	(Serbia) I Bozoljac	6	4	6
Alt	(India) S Devvarman	6^{4}	6	6
5	(Canada) J Levine	7^{7}	3	4
4	(Germany) B Becker	2	2
Q	(United States) A Kuznetsov	6	6
(United States) T Smyczek	3	6	6
WC	(United States) B Fratangelo	6	4	4
(United States) R Williams	6	6
WC	(United States) T Sandgren	2	3
(United States) S Johnson	7^{9}	2
7	(United States) J Sock	6^{7}	2^{r}

Second round
(Germany) M Zverev	6	2	6
(United Kingdom) J Ward	1	6	4
Q	(Serbia) I Bozoljac	4	4
Alt	(India) S Devvarman	6	6
Q	(United States) A Kuznetsov	3	7^{7}	6
(United States) T Smyczek	6	6^{1}	4
(United States) R Williams	1	3
(United States) S Johnson	6	6

Quarterfinals
(Germany) M Zverev	4	2
Alt	(India) S Devvarman	6	6
Q	(United States) A Kuznetsov	6	3	6
(United States) S Johnson	2	6	1

Semifinals
Alt	(India) S Devvarman	6	1	3
Q	(United States) A Kuznetsov	3	6	6

=== Bottom half ===
First round
6	(Argentina) G Pella	6^{5}	7^{7}	6
Alt	(United States) B Klahn	7^{7}	6^{2}	2
(China) Z Zhang	6	6
Q	(South Korea) S-y Jeong	2	2
Alt	(Ukraine) D Molchanov	6	3	6
(Croatia) I Karlović	4	6	1
(Canada) F Dancevic	6	6
3	(Argentina) M Alund	3	2
8	(United States) W Odesnik	6	6
(Russia) A Bogomolov Jr.	1	1
(Germany) C-M Stebe	6	6
(Spain) A Menéndez Maceiras	1	3
(Russia) T Gabashvili	6	6
WC	(United States) Mitchell Frank	3	2
(Argentina) F Argüello	7^{7}	6
2	(United States) R Harrison	6^{3}	4

Second round
6	(Argentina) G Pella	6	2	6
(China) Z Zhang	4	6	1
Alt	(Ukraine) D Molchanov	7	7^{7}
(Canada) F Dancevic	5	6^{2}
8	(United States) W Odesnik	6	3	6
(Germany) C-M Stebe	3	6	4
(Russia) T Gabashvili	2	1
(Argentina) F Argüello	6	6

Quarterfinals
6	(Argentina) G Pella	6^{4}	6	5
Alt	(Ukraine) D Molchanov	7^{7}	4	7
8	(United States) W Odesnik	6	6
(Argentina) F Argüello	3	0

Semifinals
Alt	(Ukraine) D Molchanov	6^{1}	7^{7}	1
8	(United States) W Odesnik	7^{7}	6^{1}	6
