= 2011 Sarasota Open – Doubles =

Doubles
- 2011 Sarasota Open

Final
- Champions: (Australia) Ashley Fisher (Australia) Stephen Huss
- Runners-up: (United States) Alex Bogomolov Jr. (United States) Alex Kuznetsov
- Score: 6–3, 6–4

Events
Singles	Doubles
← 2010 ·	Sarasota Open	· 2012 →

Brian Battistone and Ryler DeHeart were the defending champions but decided not to participate.
Ashley Fisher and Stephen Huss defeated Alex Bogomolov Jr. and Alex Kuznetsov 6–3, 6–4 in the final.

== Seeds ==
1. (South Africa) Rik de Voest / (South Africa) Izak van der Merwe (semifinals)
2. (Australia) Ashley Fisher / (Australia) Stephen Huss (champions)
3. (Argentina) ~~Brian Dabul~~ / (United States) ~~John Paul Fruttero~~ (withdrew)
4. (United States) Lester Cook / (United States) Brett Joelson (first round)

== Draw ==
=== Key ===
- Q = Qualifier
- WC = Wild card
- LL = Lucky loser
- Alt = Alternate
- SE = Special exempt
- PR = Protected ranking
- ITF = ITF entry
- JE = Junior exempt
- w/o = Walkover
- r = Retired
- d = Defaulted
- SR = Special ranking

=== Draw ===
First round
1	(South Africa) R de Voest (South Africa) I van der Merwe	6	6
WC	(United States) Ty Braswell (United States) Nick Crowell	0	4
Q	(United States) Vlademyros Stolarienko (United States) Mark Oljaca	2	3
(United Kingdom) J Ward (Slovenia) G Žemlja	6	6
4	(United States) L Cook (United States) Brett Joelson	6^{3}	6	[7]
(United States) A Bogomolov Jr. (United States) A Kuznetsov	7	2	[10]
WC	(United States) A Collarini (United States) D Kudla	6	6
(Canada) P Bester (Canada) Kamil Pajkowski	1	4
(Bosnia and Herzegovina) A Delić (Canada) P-L Duclos	7	6
(Romania) C Gârd (United Kingdom) Morgan Phillips	6^{2}	0
LL	(India) Siddhartha Chappidi (India) Vamsee Chappidi	7	7
LL	(Japan) Ryotero Matsumura (Japan) Naoki Nakagawa	5	6^{7}
(Serbia) Vladimir Obradović (Australia) J Sirianni	6^{6}	3
WC	(United States) Christian Harrison (United States) R Harrison	7	6
(Argentina) JP Brzezicki (France) É Prodon	2	5
2	(Australia) A Fisher (Australia) S Huss	6	7

Quarterfinals
1	(South Africa) R de Voest (South Africa) I van der Merwe	6	7
(United Kingdom) J Ward (Slovenia) G Žemlja	1	6^{6}
(United States) A Bogomolov Jr. (United States) A Kuznetsov	6	6
WC	(United States) A Collarini (United States) D Kudla	1	3
(Bosnia and Herzegovina) A Delić (Canada) P-L Duclos	6	6
LL	(India) Siddhartha Chappidi (India) Vamsee Chappidi	2	0
WC	(United States) Christian Harrison (United States) R Harrison	4	6	[2]
2	(Australia) A Fisher (Australia) S Huss	6	4	[10]

Semifinals
1	(South Africa) R de Voest (South Africa) I van der Merwe	5	3
(United States) A Bogomolov Jr. (United States) A Kuznetsov	7	6
(Bosnia and Herzegovina) A Delić (Canada) P-L Duclos	w/o
2	(Australia) A Fisher (Australia) S Huss

Final
(United States) A Bogomolov Jr. (United States) A Kuznetsov	3	4
2	(Australia) A Fisher (Australia) S Huss	6	6
