= 2012 Sarasota Open =

- Date: 16–22 April
- Edition: 4th
- Surface: Clay
- Location: Sarasota, United States

Champions

Singles
- (United States) Sam Querrey

Doubles
- (Sweden) Johan Brunström / (South Africa) Izak van der Merwe
← 2011 ·	Sarasota Open	· 2013 →

The 2012 Sarasota Open was a professional tennis tournament played on clay courts. It was the fourth edition of the tournament which was part of the 2012 ATP Challenger Tour. It took place in Sarasota, United States between April 16 and April 22, 2012.

== Singles main draw entrants ==
=== Seeds ===
Country	Player	Rank^{1}	Seed
USA	James Blake	74	1
JPN	Go Soeda	77	2
GER	Björn Phau	93	3
CAN	Vasek Pospisil	95	4
ITA	Paolo Lorenzi	96	5
USA	Sam Querrey	103	6
USA	Wayne Odesnik	109	7
ESP	Rubén Ramírez Hidalgo	110	8

- ^{1} Rankings are as of April 9, 2012.

=== Other entrants ===
The following players received wildcards into the singles main draw:

- (United States) James Blake
- (United States) Tim Smyczek
- (United States) Mac Styslinger
- (United States) Rhyne Williams

The following players received entry from the qualifying draw:

- (United States) Brian Baker
- (Romania) Cătălin Gârd
- (Switzerland) Michael Lammer
- (United States) Nicholas Monroe

== Champions ==
=== Singles ===
- (United States) Sam Querrey def. (Italy) Paolo Lorenzi, 6–1, 6–7^{(3–7)}, 6–3

=== Doubles ===
- (Sweden) Johan Brunström / (South Africa) Izak van der Merwe def. (Germany) Martin Emmrich / (Sweden) Andreas Siljeström, 6–4, 6–1
