= 2022 Sarasota Open =

- Date: 11–17 April
- Edition: 12th
- Surface: Clay (Green)
- Location: Sarasota, Florida, United States

Champions

Singles
- (Colombia) Daniel Elahi Galán

Doubles
- (United States) Robert Galloway / (United States) Jackson Withrow
← 2019 ·	Sarasota Open	· 2023 →

The 2022 Sarasota Open was a professional tennis tournament played on clay courts. It was the 12th edition of the tournament which was part of the 2022 ATP Challenger Tour. It took place in Sarasota, Florida, United States between April 11 and April 17, 2022.

== Singles main-draw entrants ==
=== Seeds ===
Country	Player	Rank^{1}	Seed
USA	Denis Kudla	81	1
~~AUS~~	~~Jordan Thompson~~	~~83~~	~~2~~
CHI	Alejandro Tabilo	100	3
USA	Steve Johnson	108	4
COL	Daniel Elahi Galán	121	5
ARG	Juan Ignacio Londero	131	6
USA	Jack Sock	138	7
CHI	Tomás Barrios Vera	144	8

- ^{1} Rankings are as of April 4, 2022.

=== Other entrants ===
The following players received wildcards into the singles main draw:

- (United States) Ryan Harrison
- (United States) Michael Mmoh
- (United States) Govind Nanda

The following player received entry into the singles main draw using a protected ranking:

- (Australia) Andrew Harris

The following players received entry into the singles main draw as alternates:

- (United States) Nicolas Moreno de Alboran
- (Japan) Yosuke Watanuki
- (Chinese Taipei) Wu Tung-lin

The following players received entry from the qualifying draw:

- (Bulgaria) Adrian Andreev
- (Netherlands) Gijs Brouwer
- (Canada) Alexis Galarneau
- (United States) Christian Harrison
- (Australia) Rinky Hijikata
- (United States) Aleksandar Kovacevic

The following players received entry as lucky losers:

- (Australia) Max Purcell
- (United States) Alex Rybakov
- (Denmark) Mikael Torpegaard

== Champions ==
=== Singles ===
- (Colombia) Daniel Elahi Galán def. (United States) Steve Johnson 7–6^{(9–7)}, 4–6, 6–1.

=== Doubles ===
- (United States) Robert Galloway / (United States) Jackson Withrow def. (Sweden) André Göransson / (United States) Nathaniel Lammons 6–3, 7–6^{(7–3)}.
