= 2009 All Star Children's Foundation Sarasota Open =

- Date: May 11–17, 2009
- Edition: 1st
- Location: Longboat Key, Florida, United States

Champions

Singles
- (United Kingdom) James Ward

Doubles
- (Dominican Republic) Víctor Estrella / (Mexico) Santiago González
All Star Children's Foundation Sarasota Open	· 2010 →

The 2009 All Star Children's Foundation Sarasota Open was a professional tennis tournament played on outdoor green clay courts. It was part of the 2009 ATP Challenger Tour. It took place in Longboat Key, Florida, United States between May 9 and May 17, 2009.

== Singles entrants ==
=== Seeds ===
Nationality	Player	Ranking*	Seeding
USA	~~Kevin Kim~~	~~103~~	~~1~~
USA	Vince Spadea	110	2
USA	Donald Young	162	3
AUS	Carsten Ball	182	4
BEL	Xavier Malisse	185	5
USA	Scoville Jenkins	193	6
USA	Michael Russell	201	7
MEX	Santiago González	207	8

- Rankings are as of May 11, 2009.

=== Other entrants ===
The following players received wildcards into the singles main draw:

- (United States) Stephen Bass
- (United States) Ryan Harrison
- (United States) Chris Klingemann
- (United States) Jesse Witten

The following players received entry from the qualifying draw:

- (Lithuania) Ričardas Berankis
- (Australia) Bernard Tomic
- (United Kingdom) James Ward
- (South Africa) Fritz Wolmarans

The following players received the lucky loser spots:

- (Argentina) Nicolás Todero

The following players received special exempt into the main draw:

- (United States) Alex Kuznetsov

== Champions ==
=== Singles ===
(United Kingdom) James Ward def. (Australia) Carsten Ball, 7–6(4), 4–6, 6–3

=== Doubles ===
(Dominican Republic) Víctor Estrella / (Mexico) Santiago González def. (India) Harsh Mankad / (United States) Kaes Van't Hof, 6–2, 6–4
