= 2013 Sarasota Open =

- Date: 13 – 21 April
- Edition: 5th
- Draw: 32S / 16D
- Prize money: $100,000
- Surface: Clay, Green
- Location: Sarasota, United States

Champions

Singles
- (United States) Alex Kuznetsov

Doubles
- (Serbia) Ilija Bozoljac / (India) Somdev Devvarman
← 2012 ·	Sarasota Open	· 2014 →

The 2013 Sarasota Open was a professional tennis tournament played on clay courts. It was the fifth edition of the tournament which was part of the 2013 ATP Challenger Tour. It took place in Sarasota, Florida, United States between April 13 and April 21, 2013.

== Singles main draw entrants ==
=== Seeds ===
Country	Player	Rank^{1}	Seed
USA	Michael Russell	72	1
USA	Ryan Harrison	88	2
ARG	Martín Alund	94	3
GER	Benjamin Becker	95	4
CAN	Jesse Levine	97	5
ARG	Guido Pella	103	6
USA	Tim Smyczek	110	7
USA	Wayne Odesnik	119	8

- ^{1} Rankings are as of April 8, 2013.

=== Other entrants ===
The following players received wildcards into the singles main draw:

- (United Kingdom) Kyle Edmund
- (United States) Mitchell Frank
- (United States) Bjorn Fratangelo
- (United States) Tennys Sandgren

The following players received entry as an alternate into the singles main draw:

- (India) Somdev Devvarman
- (United States) Bradley Klahn
- (Ukraine) Denys Molchanov

The following players received entry from the qualifying draw:

- (Serbia) Ilija Bozoljac
- (South Korea) Jeong Suk-Young
- (United States) Alex Kuznetsov
- (South Korea) Lim Yong-Kyu

== Doubles main draw entrants ==
=== Seeds ===
Country	Player	Country	Player	Rank^{1}	Seed
SWE	Johan Brunström	USA	Eric Butorac	101	1
GBR	Jamie Murray	AUS	John Peers	154	2
USA	Nicholas Monroe	GER	Simon Stadler	163	3
GER	Benjamin Becker	ITA	Stefano Ianni	298	4

- ^{1} Rankings as of April 8, 2013.

=== Other entrants ===
The following pairs received wildcards into the doubles main draw:

- (United States) Terrell Celestine / (India) Siddhartha Chappidi
- (United States) Bjorn Fratangelo / (United States) Mitchell Krueger
- (United States) Alex Kuznetsov / (Germany) Mischa Zverev

The following pairs received entry from the qualifying draw:

- (Serbia) Ilija Bozoljac / (India) Somdev Devvarman

== Champions ==
=== Singles ===
- (United States) Alex Kuznetsov def. (United States) Wayne Odesnik, 6–0, 6–2

=== Doubles ===
- (Serbia) Ilija Bozoljac / (India) Somdev Devvarman def. (United States) Steve Johnson / (United States) Bradley Klahn, 6–7^{(5–7)}, 7–6^{(7–3)}, [11–9]
