= 2012 Sarasota Open – Doubles =

Doubles
- 2012 Sarasota Open

Final
- Champions: (Sweden) Johan Brunström (South Africa) Izak van der Merwe
- Runners-up: (Germany) Martin Emmrich (Sweden) Andreas Siljeström
- Score: 6–4, 6–1

Events
Singles	Doubles
← 2011 ·	Sarasota Open	· 2013 →

Ashley Fisher and Stephen Huss were the defending champions but decided not to participate.
Johan Brunström and Izak van der Merwe won the title, defeating Martin Emmrich and Andreas Siljeström 6–4, 6–1 in the final.

== Seeds ==
1. (Germany) Martin Emmrich / (Sweden) Andreas Siljeström (final)
2. (Spain) Rubén Ramírez Hidalgo / (Argentina) Horacio Zeballos (first round)
3. (Germany) Philipp Marx / (Croatia) Lovro Zovko (first round)
4. (United Kingdom) Jamie Delgado / (United Kingdom) Ken Skupski (first round)

== Draw ==
=== Key ===
- Q = Qualifier
- WC = Wild card
- LL = Lucky loser
- Alt = Alternate
- SE = Special exempt
- PR = Protected ranking
- ITF = ITF entry
- JE = Junior exempt
- w/o = Walkover
- r = Retired
- d = Defaulted
- SR = Special ranking

=== Draw ===
First round
1	(Germany) M Emmrich (Sweden) A Siljeström	6	6
WC	(Canada) P Bester (India) Vamsee Chappidi	2	4
(Philippines) TC Huey (United Kingdom) D Inglot	4	6	[10]
(France) A Gensse (France) É Prodon	6	2	[5]
3	(Germany) P Marx (Croatia) L Zovko	6	3	[5]
(Australia) C Ball (United States) B Reynolds	4	6	[10]
(United States) J Levine (Australia) M Matosevic	7^{7}	6
(United States) S Lipsky (Canada) V Pospisil	6^{4}	3
Q	(United States) A Kuznetsov (Germany) M Zverev	4	6^{5}
(Russia) T Gabashvili (United States) W Odesnik	6	7^{7}
WC	(United Kingdom) C Eaton (United States) N Monroe	3	6	[10]
4	(United Kingdom) J Delgado (United Kingdom) K Skupski	6	3	[1]
WC	(United States) T Parrott (United States) M Yani	6	6
(Italy) P Lorenzi (Japan) G Soeda	1	4
(Sweden) J Brunström (South Africa) I van der Merwe	6	6
2	(Spain) R Ramírez Hidalgo (Argentina) H Zeballos	3	3

Quarterfinals
1	(Germany) M Emmrich (Sweden) A Siljeström	6	6
(Philippines) TC Huey (United Kingdom) D Inglot	4	1
(Australia) C Ball (United States) B Reynolds	6	7^{7}
(United States) J Levine (Australia) M Matosevic	3	6^{3}
(Russia) T Gabashvili (United States) W Odesnik	6	6
WC	(United Kingdom) C Eaton (United States) N Monroe	3	2
WC	(United States) T Parrott (United States) M Yani	2	6	[13]
(Sweden) J Brunström (South Africa) I van der Merwe	6	4	[15]

Semifinals
1	(Germany) M Emmrich (Sweden) A Siljeström	7	4	[10]
(Australia) C Ball (United States) B Reynolds	5	6	[5]
(Russia) T Gabashvili (United States) W Odesnik	3	2
(Sweden) J Brunström (South Africa) I van der Merwe	6	6

Final
1	(Germany) M Emmrich (Sweden) A Siljeström	4	1
(Sweden) J Brunström (South Africa) I van der Merwe	6	6
