= 2025 Sarasota Open =

- Date: 7–13 April
- Edition: 15th
- Surface: Clay (green)
- Location: Sarasota, Florida, United States

Champions

Singles
- (United States) Emilio Nava

Doubles
- (United States) Robert Cash / (United States) JJ Tracy
← 2024 ·	Sarasota Open	· 2026 →

The 2025 Sarasota Open was a professional tennis tournament played on clay courts. It was the 15th edition of the tournament which was part of the 2025 ATP Challenger Tour. It took place in Sarasota, Florida, United States between April 7 and 13, 2025.

== Singles main-draw entrants ==
=== Seeds ===
Country	Player	Rank^{1}	Seed
USA	Eliot Spizzirri	129	1
ARG	Federico Agustín Gómez	140	2
USA	Mitchell Krueger	141	3
CHI	Tomás Barrios Vera	147	4
USA	Emilio Nava	164	5
~~KAZ~~	~~Dmitry Popko~~	~~175~~	~~6~~
CAN	Liam Draxl	178	7
ARG	Facundo Mena	188	8

- ^{1} Rankings are as of March 31, 2025.

=== Other entrants ===
The following players received wildcards into the singles main draw:

- (United States) Martin Damm
- (United States) Garrett Johns
- (United States) Tyler Zink

The following players received entry into the singles main draw as alternates:

- (France) Mathys Erhard
- (United States) Michael Mmoh
- (Brazil) Karue Sell

The following players received entry from the qualifying draw:

- (Romania) Gabi Adrian Boitan
- (Brazil) Daniel Dutra da Silva
- (United States) Patrick Maloney
- (Spain) Iñaki Montes de la Torre
- (Argentina) Genaro Alberto Olivieri
- (Bolivia) Juan Carlos Prado Ángelo

The following players received entry as lucky losers:

- (France) Geoffrey Blancaneaux
- (France) Corentin Denolly

== Champions ==
=== Singles ===
- (United States) Emilio Nava def. (Canada) Liam Draxl 6–2, 7–6^{(7–2)}.

=== Doubles ===
- (United States) Robert Cash / (United States) JJ Tracy def. (Argentina) Federico Agustín Gómez / (Venezuela) Luis David Martínez 6–4, 7–6^{(7–3)}.
