= 2024 Sarasota Open – Doubles =

Doubles
- 2024 Sarasota Open

Final
- Champions: (United States) Tristan Boyer (United Kingdom) Oliver Crawford
- Runners-up: (United States) Ethan Quinn (United States) Tennys Sandgren
- Score: 6–4, 6–2

Events
Singles	Doubles
← 2023 ·	Sarasota Open	· 2025 →

Julian Cash and Henry Patten were the defending champions but chose not to defend their title.

Tristan Boyer and Oliver Crawford won the title after defeating Ethan Quinn and Tennys Sandgren 6–4, 6–2 in the final.

== Seeds ==
1. (United States) William Blumberg / (Venezuela) Luis David Martínez (quarterfinals)
2. (United States) Christian Harrison / (United Kingdom) Marcus Willis (first round)
3. (India) Sriram Balaji / (Germany) Andre Begemann (first round)
4. (United Kingdom) Scott Duncan / (Argentina) Federico Agustín Gómez (first round)

== Draw ==
=== Key ===
- Q = Qualifier
- WC = Wild card
- LL = Lucky loser
- Alt = Alternate
- SE = Special exempt
- PR = Protected ranking
- ITF = ITF entry
- JE = Junior exempt
- w/o = Walkover
- r = Retired
- d = Defaulted
- SR = Special ranking

=== Draw ===
First round
1	(United States) W Blumberg (Venezuela) LD Martínez	6	6
(Switzerland) A Ritschard (Canada) B Sigouin	4	2
(United States) E King (United States) M Krueger	6	7^{7}
(France) C Denolly (France) C Tabur	4	6^{4}
3	(India) S Balaji (Germany) A Begemann	6	3	[8]
(United States) T Boyer (United Kingdom) O Crawford	2	6	[10]
(United States) M Damm (United States) A Rybakov	2	4
(United States) D Kudla (United States) T-S Kwiatkowski	6	6
(New Zealand) A Rai (Canada) K Stevenson	4	6^{5}
(United States) E Quinn (United States) T Sandgren	6	7^{7}
WC	(United States) Boris Kozlov (United States) S Kozlov	6	6
4	(United Kingdom) S Duncan (Argentina) FA Gómez	4	4
(Australia) T Fancutt (United States) H Reese	6	6
WC	(New Zealand) M Daniell (Austria) JJ Schwärzler	4	4
(France) G Blancaneaux (France) C Hemery	6	6
2	(United States) C Harrison (United Kingdom) M Willis	3	2

Quarterfinals
1	(United States) W Blumberg (Venezuela) LD Martínez	4	2
(United States) E King (United States) M Krueger	6	6
(United States) T Boyer (United Kingdom) O Crawford	6	6
(United States) D Kudla (United States) T-S Kwiatkowski	4	2
(United States) E Quinn (United States) T Sandgren	2	7	[11]
WC	(United States) B Kozlov (United States) S Kozlov	6	5	[9]
(Australia) T Fancutt (United States) H Reese	6	6
(France) G Blancaneaux (France) C Hemery	4	0

Semifinals
(United States) E King (United States) M Krueger	6	4	[12]
(United States) T Boyer (United Kingdom) O Crawford	3	6	[14]
(United States) E Quinn (United States) T Sandgren	6	2	[10]
(Australia) T Fancutt (United States) H Reese	3	6	[7]

Final
(United States) T Boyer (United Kingdom) O Crawford	6	6
(United States) E Quinn (United States) T Sandgren	4	2
