= 2010 Sarasota Open – Doubles =

Doubles
- 2010 Sarasota Open

Final
- Champions: (United States) Brian Battistone (United States) Ryler DeHeart
- Runners-up: (Germany) Gero Kretschmer (Germany) Alex Satschko
- Score: 5–7, 7–6(4), [10–8]

Events
Singles	Doubles
- Sarasota Open

Víctor Estrella and Santiago González were the defending champions, but González chose to play in Zagreb instead. Estrella partnered another Mexican player Bruno Rodríguez, but they lost to Treat Conrad Huey and Harsh Mankad in the quarterfinals.

Brian Battistone and Ryler DeHeart won in the final 5–7, 7–6(4), [10–8] against Gero Kretschmer and Alex Satschko.

== Seeds ==
1. (Philippines) Treat Conrad Huey / (India) Harsh Mankad (semifinals)
2. (Australia) Kaden Hensel / (Australia) Adam Hubble (semifinals)
3. (Sweden) Andreas Siljeström / (Australia) Joseph Sirianni (quarterfinals)
4. (United States) Brian Battistone / (United States) Ryler DeHeart (champions)

== Draw ==
Key

- Q = Qualifier
- WC = Wild card
- LL = Lucky loser
- Alt = Alternate
- ITF = ITF entry
- PR = Protected ranking
- SR = Special ranking
- SE = Special exempt
- JE = Junior exempt
- JR = Junior Accelerator Programme entrant
- CO = College Accelerator Programme entrant
- NG = Next Gen Accelerator Program entrant
- w/o = Walkover
- r = Retired
- d = Defaulted

=== Draw ===
First round
1	(Philippines) TC Huey (India) H Mankad	1	7	[10]
(Mexico) D Garza (Canada) V Pospisil	6	5	[8]
(United States) J Levine (United States) B Reynolds	6	5	[8]
(Dominican Republic) V Estrella (Mexico) B Rodríguez	2	7	[10]
4	(United States) B Battistone (United States) R DeHeart	6	6
WC	(United States) S Bangoura (United States) M Styslinger	4	1
(United States) L Cook (United States) K Kim	3	2
(Argentina) B Dabul (United States) JP Fruttero	6	6
Q	(Germany) G Kretschmer (Germany) A Satschko	7	6
(United States) N Monroe (Sweden) M Ryderstedt	5	1
WC	(United States) Ty Braswell (United States) Derek Myers	4	2
3	(Sweden) A Siljeström (Australia) J Sirianni	6	6
(United States) C Parr (United States) Todd Paul	2	4
(Australia) G Jones (New Zealand) J Statham	6	6
WC	(Canada) P Bester (United States) M Venus	3	0
2	(Australia) K Hensel (Australia) A Hubble	6	6

Quarterfinals
1	(Philippines) TC Huey (India) H Mankad	6	2	[15]
(Dominican Republic) V Estrella (Mexico) B Rodríguez	3	6	[13]
4	(United States) B Battistone (United States) R DeHeart	7	6
(Argentina) B Dabul (United States) JP Fruttero	6^{2}	2
Q	(Germany) G Kretschmer (Germany) A Satschko	5	7	[10]
3	(Sweden) A Siljeström (Australia) J Sirianni	7	5	[5]
(Australia) G Jones (New Zealand) J Statham	4	2
2	(Australia) K Hensel (Australia) A Hubble	6	6

Semifinals
1	(Philippines) TC Huey (India) H Mankad	3	7	[5]
4	(United States) B Battistone (United States) R DeHeart	6	5	[10]
Q	(Germany) G Kretschmer (Germany) A Satschko	7	7
2	(Australia) K Hensel (Australia) A Hubble	6^{3}	6^{5}

Finals
4	(United States) B Battistone (United States) R DeHeart	5	7	[10]
Q	(Germany) G Kretschmer (Germany) A Satschko	7	6^{4}	[8]
