= 2014 Sarasota Open – Doubles =

Doubles
- 2014 Sarasota Open

Final
- Champion: (Croatia) Marin Draganja (Finland) Henri Kontinen
- Runner-up: (Spain) Rubén Ramírez Hidalgo (Croatia) Franko Škugor
- Score: 7–5, 5–7, [10–6]

Events
| Singles | Doubles |
- Sarasota Open

Ilija Bozoljac and Somdev Devvarman were the defending champions, but decided not to compete.

Marin Draganja and Henri Kontinen won the title, defeating Rubén Ramírez Hidalgo and Franko Škugor in the final, 7–5, 5–7, [10–6].

== Seeds ==
1. (United States) Scott Lipsky / (New Zealand) Michael Venus (first round)
2. (Croatia) Marin Draganja / (Finland) Henri Kontinen (champions)
3. (United Kingdom) Ken Skupski / (United Kingdom) Neal Skupski (semifinals)
4. (Germany) Gero Kretschmer / (Germany) Alexander Satschko (first round)

== Draw ==
Key

- Q = Qualifier
- WC = Wild card
- LL = Lucky loser
- Alt = Alternate
- ITF = ITF entry
- PR = Protected ranking
- SR = Special ranking
- SE = Special exempt
- JE = Junior exempt
- JR = Junior Accelerator Programme entrant
- CO = College Accelerator Programme entrant
- NG = Next Gen Accelerator Program entrant
- w/o = Walkover
- r = Retired
- d = Defaulted

=== Main draw ===
First round
1 | (United States) S Lipsky (New Zealand) M Venus | 4 | 4
Q | (Spain) R Ramírez Hidalgo (Croatia) F Škugor | 6 | 6
WC | (United States) S Bangoura (United States) V Mirzadeh | 6 | 6
WC | (United States) Siddhartha Chappidi (Germany) Joel Link | 0 | 4
4 | (Germany) G Kretschmer (Germany) A Satschko | 1 | 4
(Italy) A Arnaboldi (Russia) A Bogomolov Jr. | 6 | 6
(Spain) J Alonso (United States) H Armando | 5 | 3
(United States) J Cerretani (Sweden) A Siljeström | 7 | 6
(Germany) P Marx (Slovakia) M Mertiňák | 7 | 4 | [10]
(Argentina) F Bagnis (Austria) G Melzer | 5 | 6 | [7]
(United States) N Monroe (United States) D Young | 3 | 6 | [9]
3 | (United Kingdom) K Skupski (United Kingdom) N Skupski | 6 | 4 | [11]
WC | (United States) J Jenkins (United States) Mac Styslinger | 7 | 1 | [10]
(Australia) R Junaid (Canada) A Shamasdin | 5 | 6 | [5]
(Australia) J Kerr (United States) A Kuznetsov | 6 | 3 | [8]
2 | (Croatia) M Draganja (Finland) H Kontinen | 3 | 6 | [10]

Quarterfinals
Q | (Spain) R Ramírez Hidalgo (Croatia) F Škugor | 6 | 4 | [10]
WC | (United States) S Bangoura (United States) V Mirzadeh | 1 | 6 | [7]
(Italy) A Arnaboldi (Russia) A Bogomolov Jr.
(United States) J Cerretani (Sweden) A Siljeström | w/o
(Germany) P Marx (Slovakia) M Mertiňák | 5 | 4
3 | (United Kingdom) K Skupski (United Kingdom) N Skupski | 7 | 6
WC | (United States) J Jenkins (United States) M Styslinger | 4 | 4
2 | (Croatia) M Draganja (Finland) H Kontinen | 6 | 6

Semifinals
Q | (Spain) R Ramírez Hidalgo (Croatia) F Škugor | 4 | 7^{7} | [11]
(United States) J Cerretani (Sweden) A Siljeström | 6 | 6^{3} | [9]
3 | (United Kingdom) K Skupski (United Kingdom) N Skupski | 4 | 2
2 | (Croatia) M Draganja (Finland) H Kontinen | 6 | 6

Final
Q | (Spain) R Ramírez Hidalgo (Croatia) F Škugor | 5 | 7 | [6]
2 | (Croatia) M Draganja (Finland) H Kontinen | 7 | 5 | [10]
