= 2016 Sarasota Open – Doubles =

Doubles
- 2016 Sarasota Open

Final
- Champion: (Argentina) Facundo Argüello (Argentina) Nicolás Kicker
- Runner-up: (El Salvador) Marcelo Arévalo (Peru) Sergio Galdós
- Score: 4–6, 6–4, [10–6]

Events
Singles	Doubles
- Sarasota Open

Facundo Argüello and Facundo Bagnis were the defending champions but only Argüello has returned to defend his title partnering Nicolás Kicker.

Argüello and Kicker won the title, defeating Marcelo Arévalo and Sergio Galdós 4–6, 6–4, [10–6] in the final.

== Seeds ==
1. (United States) Scott Lipsky / (United Kingdom) Neal Skupski (first round)
2. (United States) Dennis Novikov / (Chile) Julio Peralta (semifinals)
3. (South Africa) Dean O'Brien / (South Africa) Ruan Roelofse (semifinals)
4. (India) Purav Raja / (India) Divij Sharan (quarterfinals)

== Draw ==
Key

- Q = Qualifier
- WC = Wild card
- LL = Lucky loser
- Alt = Alternate
- ITF = ITF entry
- PR = Protected ranking
- SR = Special ranking
- SE = Special exempt
- JE = Junior exempt
- JR = Junior Accelerator Programme entrant
- CO = College Accelerator Programme entrant
- NG = Next Gen Accelerator Program entrant
- w/o = Walkover
- r = Retired
- d = Defaulted

First round
1	(United States) S Lipsky (United Kingdom) N Skupski	6	6^{7}	[6]
(Argentina) F Argüello (Argentina) N Kicker	4	7^{9}	[10]
(United States) B Fratangelo (United States) T Paul	6	7
(Ecuador) G Lapentti (Venezuela) R Maytín	3	5
3	(South Africa) D O'Brien (South Africa) R Roelofse	6	3	[10]
(Canada) P Polansky (Germany) M Zverev	1	6	[8]
WC	(United States) D Baughman (United States) A Halebian	6	6
(United States) R Harrison (United States) D Kudla	3	0
WC	(United States) Russell Benkaim (United States) Brian Berdusco	1	3
(El Salvador) M Arévalo (Peru) S Galdós	6	6
(Brazil) G Clezar (Brazil) T Monteiro
4	(India) P Raja (India) D Sharan	w/o
WC	(United States) S Bangoura (United States) Connor Smith	6	0	[11]
(Austria) G Melzer (United Kingdom) J Ward	4	6	[9]
Q	(France) Q Halys (France) A Michon	6	3	[5]
2	(United States) D Novikov (Chile) J Peralta	3	6	[10]

Quarterfinals
(Argentina) F Argüello (Argentina) N Kicker	6^{4}	6	[10]
(United States) B Fratangelo (United States) T Paul	7^{7}	2	[1]
3	(South Africa) D O'Brien (South Africa) R Roelofse	7	6
WC	(United States) D Baughman (United States) A Halebian	5	4
(El Salvador) M Arévalo (Peru) S Galdós	6	7^{7}
4	(India) P Raja (India) D Sharan	4	6^{4}
WC	(United States) S Bangoura (United States) C Smith	0	3
2	(United States) D Novikov (Chile) J Peralta	6	6

Semifinals
(Argentina) F Argüello (Argentina) N Kicker	6	4	[10]
3	(South Africa) D O'Brien (South Africa) R Roelofse	2	6	[6]
(El Salvador) M Arévalo (Peru) S Galdós	3	6	[11]
2	(United States) D Novikov (Chile) J Peralta	6	3	[9]

Final
(Argentina) F Argüello (Argentina) N Kicker	4	6	[10]
(El Salvador) M Arévalo (Peru) S Galdós	6	4	[6]
