= 2017 Sarasota Open – Singles =

Singles
- 2017 Sarasota Open

Final
- Champion: (United States) Frances Tiafoe
- Runner-up: (United States) Tennys Sandgren
- Score: 6–3, 6–4

Events
Singles	Doubles
- Sarasota Open

Mischa Zverev was the defending champion but chose not to defend his title.

Frances Tiafoe won the title after defeating Tennys Sandgren 6–3, 6–4 in the final.

== Seeds ==
1. (United States) Jared Donaldson (quarterfinals)
2. (Argentina) Horacio Zeballos (quarterfinals, retired)
3. (United States) Frances Tiafoe (champion)
4. (Czech Republic) Adam Pavlásek (second round)
5. (Austria) Gerald Melzer (first round)
6. (Barbados) Darian King (first round)
7. (Switzerland) Henri Laaksonen (quarterfinals)
8. (Argentina) Guido Andreozzi (first round)

== Draw ==
Key

- Q = Qualifier
- WC = Wild card
- LL = Lucky loser
- Alt = Alternate
- ITF = ITF entry
- PR = Protected ranking
- SR = Special ranking
- SE = Special exempt
- JE = Junior exempt
- JR = Junior Accelerator Programme entrant
- CO = College Accelerator Programme entrant
- NG = Next Gen Accelerator Program entrant
- w/o = Walkover
- r = Retired
- d = Defaulted

=== Finals ===
Semifinals
(France) Vincent Millot	4	1
(United States) Tennys Sandgren	6	6
3	(United States) Frances Tiafoe	6	6^{5}	7^{7}
(Austria) Jürgen Melzer	4	7^{7}	6^{5}

Final
(United States) Tennys Sandgren	3	4
3	(United States) Frances Tiafoe	6	6

=== Top half ===
First round
1	(United States) J Donaldson	6	6
(United States) D Novikov	2	4
WC	(United States) S Korda	1	2
Q	(Slovenia) B Rola	6	6
(Argentina) M González	6	6
(El Salvador) M Arévalo	3	4
(France) V Millot	7^{7}	6
8	(Argentina) G Andreozzi	6^{3}	4
4	(Czech Republic) A Pavlásek	1	7	6
(Argentina) L Mayer	6	5	4
(United States) T Sandgren	6	6^{7}	7^{7}
(United States) R Opelka	4	7^{9}	6^{5}
WC	(United States) S Bangoura	2	1
(Republic of Ireland) J McGee	6	6
(United States) D Kudla	7^{7}	6
5	(Austria) G Melzer	6^{0}	2

Second round
1	(United States) J Donaldson	6	3	6
Q	(Slovenia) B Rola	4	6	4
(Argentina) M González	6	5	0
(France) V Millot	2	7	6
4	(Czech Republic) A Pavlásek	2	6	1
(United States) T Sandgren	6	4	6
(Republic of Ireland) J McGee	5	2
(United States) D Kudla	7	6

Quarterfinals
1	(United States) J Donaldson	4	5
(France) V Millot	6	7
(United States) T Sandgren	w/o
(United States) D Kudla

Semifinals
(France) V Millot	4	1
(United States) T Sandgren	6	6

=== Bottom half ===
First round
7	(Switzerland) H Laaksonen	6	6
(United States) T Smyczek	2	1
SE	(Serbia) M Kecmanović	6	6
WC	(United States) M McDonald	1	2
Q	(Brazil) JP Sorgi	6^{5}	6	6^{5}
SE	(Italy) A Arnaboldi	7^{7}	1	7^{7}
(United States) M Krueger	3	2
3	(United States) F Tiafoe	6	6
6	(Barbados) D King	2	6	2
(Austria) J Melzer	6	2	6
Q	(Argentina) F Argüello	4	6	7^{7}
WC	(United States) C Harrison	6	1	6^{3}
LL	(United States) S Kozlov	6	6
(Canada) P Polansky	4	4
Q	(Colombia) DE Galán	5	1
2	(Argentina) H Zeballos	7	6

Second round
7	(Switzerland) H Laaksonen	6	6
SE	(Serbia) M Kecmanović	3	0
SE	(Italy) A Arnaboldi	4	6	1
3	(United States) F Tiafoe	6	3	6
(Austria) J Melzer	6	6
Q	(Argentina) F Argüello	3	1
LL	(United States) S Kozlov	1	6^{3}
2	(Argentina) H Zeballos	6	7^{7}

Quarterfinals
7	(Switzerland) H Laaksonen	3	4
3	(United States) F Tiafoe	6	6
(Austria) J Melzer	7^{7}	4
2	(Argentina) H Zeballos	6^{4}	1^{r}

Semifinals
3	(United States) F Tiafoe	6	6^{5}	7^{7}
(Austria) J Melzer	4	7^{7}	6^{5}
