= 2014 Sarasota Open – Singles =

Singles
- 2014 Sarasota Open

Final
- Champion: (Australia) Nick Kyrgios
- Runner-up: (Serbia) Filip Krajinović
- Score: 7–6^{(12–10)}, 6–4

Events
| Singles | Doubles |
- Sarasota Open

Alex Kuznetsov was the defending champion, but lost in the first round to Hidalgo.

Nick Kyrgios won the title, defeating Filip Krajinović in the final, 7–6^{(12–10)}, 6–4.

== Seeds ==
1. (Russia) Alex Bogomolov Jr. (second round)
2. (United States) Donald Young (quarterfinals)
3. (United States) Jack Sock (first round)
4. (United States) Michael Russell (first round)
5. (United States) Tim Smyczek (first round)
6. (United States) Alex Kuznetsov (first round)
7. (Argentina) Facundo Bagnis (first round)
8. (Canada) Peter Polansky (second round)

== Draw ==
Key

- Q = Qualifier
- WC = Wild card
- LL = Lucky loser
- Alt = Alternate
- ITF = ITF entry
- PR = Protected ranking
- SR = Special ranking
- SE = Special exempt
- JE = Junior exempt
- JR = Junior Accelerator Programme entrant
- CO = College Accelerator Programme entrant
- NG = Next Gen Accelerator Program entrant
- w/o = Walkover
- r = Retired
- d = Defaulted

=== Finals ===
Semifinals
(Serbia) Filip Krajinović | 3 | 6 | 6
(Austria) Gerald Melzer | 6 | 3 | 1
WC | (United States) Daniel Kosakowski | 6 | 3 | 4
(Australia) Nick Kyrgios | 4 | 6 | 6

Final
(Serbia) Filip Krajinović | 6^{10} | 4
(Australia) Nick Kyrgios | 7^{12} | 6

=== Top half ===
First round
1 | (Russia) A Bogomolov Jr. | 7 | 6
Q | (France) G Mina | 5 | 3
WC | (United States) S Bangoura | 4 | 2
(Serbia) F Krajinović | 6 | 6
(Uzbekistan) F Dustov | 1 | 6 | 7^{7}
(United States) R Williams | 6 | 2 | 6^{5}
(Serbia) I Bozoljac | 6^{2} | 6^{5}
8 | (Canada) P Polansky | 7^{7} | 7^{7}
3 | (United States) J Sock | 7 | 6^{4} | 1
(Italy) A Arnaboldi | 5 | 7^{7} | 6
Q | (Japan) N Nakagawa | 1 | 3
(Austria) G Melzer | 6 | 6
(Belgium) R Bemelmans | 6 | 4 | 3
(Japan) T Daniel | 4 | 6 | 6
(Canada) F Dancevic | 5 | 6 | 7
5 | (United States) T Smyczek | 7 | 3 | 5

Second round
1 | (Russia) A Bogomolov Jr. | 3 | 4
(Serbia) F Krajinović | 6 | 6
(Uzbekistan) F Dustov | 7^{7} | 6
8 | (Canada) P Polansky | 6^{5} | 2
(Italy) A Arnaboldi | 5 | 2
(Austria) G Melzer | 7 | 6
(Japan) T Daniel | 6 | 6
(Canada) F Dancevic | 2 | 4

Quarterfinals
(Serbia) F Krajinović | 6 | 6
(Uzbekistan) F Dustov | 2 | 4
(Austria) G Melzer | 7 | 6
(Japan) T Daniel | 5 | 3

Semifinals
(Serbia) F Krajinović | 3 | 6 | 6
(Austria) G Melzer | 6 | 3 | 1

=== Bottom half ===
First round
7 | (Argentina) F Bagnis | 2 | 2
(United Kingdom) J Ward | 6 | 6
Q | (Croatia) A Veić | 5 | 6 | 6
(Ukraine) I Marchenko | 7 | 2 | 1
(Republic of Ireland) J McGee | 7^{7} | 6
WC | (United States) M Styslinger | 6^{1} | 1
WC | (United States) D Kosakowski | 6 | 6
4 | (United States) M Russell | 2 | 3
6 | (United States) A Kuznetsov | 3 | 7 | 2
(Spain) RR Hidalgo | 6 | 5 | 6
(Australia) N Kyrgios | 6 | 6
WC | (United States) J Jenkins | 3 | 4
(Germany) M Zverev | 6 | 6
(United States) B Reynolds | 3 | 3
Q | (Germany) A Zverev | 4 | 5
2 | (United States) D Young | 6 | 7

Second round
(United Kingdom) J Ward | 6 | 6
Q | (Croatia) A Veić | 4 | 2
(Republic of Ireland) J McGee | 2 | 3
WC | (United States) D Kosakowski | 6 | 6
(Spain) RR Hidalgo | 6^{8} | 4
(Australia) N Kyrgios | 7^{10} | 6
(Germany) M Zverev | 4 | 0^{r}
2 | (United States) D Young | 6 | 0

Quarterfinals
(United Kingdom) J Ward | 3 | 6^{4}
WC | (United States) D Kosakowski | 6 | 7^{7}
(Australia) N Kyrgios | 6 | 6
2 | (United States) D Young | 4 | 4

Semifinals
WC | (United States) D Kosakowski | 6 | 3 | 4
(Australia) N Kyrgios | 4 | 6 | 6
