= 2024 Sarasota Open – Singles =

Singles
- 2024 Sarasota Open

Final
- Champion: (Australia) Thanasi Kokkinakis
- Runner-up: (Belgium) Zizou Bergs
- Score: 6–3, 1–6, 6–0

Events
Singles	Doubles
- Sarasota Open

Daniel Altmaier was the defending champion but chose not to defend his title.

Thanasi Kokkinakis won the title after defeating Zizou Bergs 6–3, 1–6, 6–0 in the final.

== Seeds ==
1. (United States) J. J. Wolf (first round)
2. (Peru) Juan Pablo Varillas (second round)
3. (Australia) Thanasi Kokkinakis (champion)
4. (Belgium) Zizou Bergs (final)
5. (United States) Michael Mmoh (withdrew)
6. (United States) Patrick Kypson (first round)
7. (Canada) Gabriel Diallo (quarterfinals)
8. (United States) Denis Kudla (first round)

== Draw ==
Key

- Q = Qualifier
- WC = Wild card
- LL = Lucky loser
- Alt = Alternate
- ITF = ITF entry
- PR = Protected ranking
- SR = Special ranking
- SE = Special exempt
- JE = Junior exempt
- JR = Junior Accelerator Programme entrant
- CO = College Accelerator Programme entrant
- NG = Next Gen Accelerator Program entrant
- w/o = Walkover
- r = Retired
- d = Defaulted

=== Finals ===
Semifinals
Alt	(United States) Tennys Sandgren	2	6	4
4	(Belgium) Zizou Bergs	6	3	6
3	(Australia) Thanasi Kokkinakis	6	7^{7}
(Australia) Marc Polmans	2	6^{5}

Final
4	(Belgium) Zizou Bergs	3	6	0
3	(Australia) Thanasi Kokkinakis	6	1	6

=== Top half ===
First round
1	(United States) JJ Wolf	6^{5}	1
(Kazakhstan) D Popko	7^{7}	6
Alt	(United States) T Sandgren	4	6	6
(United States) T-S Kwiatkowski	6	3	2
(France) C Tabur	4	6^{2}
(United States) E Quinn	6	7^{7}
Q	(United States) S Kozlov	6	4	6
8	(United States) D Kudla	2	6	2
4	(Belgium) Z Bergs	6	6
(United Kingdom) O Crawford	2	2
Q	(United States) K Bigun	6	6
LL	(Norway) V Durasovic	3	4
WC	(United States) T Kodat	7^{7}	5	0
(United States) M Damm	6^{1}	7	6
Alt	(United States) M Krueger	6	3	7^{7}
6	(United States) P Kypson	2	6	6^{1}

Second round
(Kazakhstan) D Popko	2	6	2
Alt	(United States) T Sandgren	6	1	6
(United States) E Quinn	2	7	4
Q	(United States) S Kozlov	6	5	6
4	(Belgium) Z Bergs	6	6
Q	(United States) K Bigun	4	0
(United States) M Damm	4	0
Alt	(United States) M Krueger	6	6

Quarterfinals
Alt	(United States) T Sandgren	6	6
Q	(United States) S Kozlov	1	4
4	(Belgium) Z Bergs	6	1	6
Alt	(United States) M Krueger	4	6	3

Semifinals
Alt	(United States) T Sandgren	2	6	4
4	(Belgium) Z Bergs	6	3	6

=== Bottom half ===
First round
7/WC	(Canada) G Diallo	7^{7}	7^{9}
Q	(Argentina) FA Gómez	6^{4}	6^{7}
(Austria) JJ Schwärzler	2	6	5
(United States) T Boyer	6	4	7
(Switzerland) A Ritschard	6	6
Q	(Italy) G Fonio	3	1
Q	(Croatia) M Pecotić	6^{4}	3
3	(Australia) T Kokkinakis	7^{7}	6
LL	(South Korea) G Campaña Lee	6	3	4
(France) G Blancaneaux	2	6	6
Q	(United States) Felix Corwin	3	7^{7}	4
(Australia) M Polmans	6	6^{3}	6
(Italy) A Giannessi	4	6	2
(France) C Hemery	6	2	6
WC	(United States) B Kuzuhara	0	3
2	(Peru) JP Varillas	6	6

Second round
7/WC	(Canada) G Diallo	6^{4}	6	6
(United States) T Boyer	7^{7}	3	4
(Switzerland) A Ritschard	2	1
3	(Australia) T Kokkinakis	6	6
(France) G Blancaneaux	3	5
(Australia) M Polmans	6	7
(France) C Hemery	5	6	7^{8}
2	(Peru) JP Varillas	7	4	6^{6}

Quarterfinals
7/WC	(Canada) G Diallo	6^{2}	6	6^{3}
3	(Australia) T Kokkinakis	7^{7}	4	7^{7}
(Australia) M Polmans	6	0	6
(France) C Hemery	2	6	1

Semifinals
3	(Australia) T Kokkinakis	6	7^{7}
(Australia) M Polmans	2	6^{5}
