= 2016 Sarasota Open – Singles =

Singles
- 2016 Sarasota Open

Final
- Champion: (Germany) Mischa Zverev
- Runner-up: (Austria) Gerald Melzer
- Score: 6–4, 7–6^{(7–2)}

Events
Singles	Doubles
- Sarasota Open

Federico Delbonis was the defending champion but chose not to participate.

Mischa Zverev won the title, defeating Gerald Melzer 6–4, 7–6^{(7–2)} in the final.

== Seeds ==
1. (United States) Denis Kudla (first round)
2. (Argentina) Diego Schwartzman (second round)
3. (Austria) Gerald Melzer (final)
4. (Georgia (country)) Nikoloz Basilashvili (first round, retired)
5. (United States) Tim Smyczek (first round)
6. (United States) Bjorn Fratangelo (semifinals)
7. (Argentina) Facundo Argüello (second round, retired)
8. (United States) Jared Donaldson (first round)

== Draw ==
Key

- Q = Qualifier
- WC = Wild card
- LL = Lucky loser
- Alt = Alternate
- ITF = ITF entry
- PR = Protected ranking
- SR = Special ranking
- SE = Special exempt
- JE = Junior exempt
- JR = Junior Accelerator Programme entrant
- CO = College Accelerator Programme entrant
- NG = Next Gen Accelerator Program entrant
- w/o = Walkover
- r = Retired
- d = Defaulted

=== Finals ===
Semifinals
(Brazil) Guilherme Clezar	7^{7}	4	2^{r}
3	(Austria) Gerald Melzer	6^{4}	6	3
6	(United States) Bjorn Fratangelo	2	4
(Germany) Mischa Zverev	6	6

Final
3	(Austria) Gerald Melzer	4	6^{2}
(Germany) Mischa Zverev	6	7^{7}

=== Top half ===
First round
1	(United States) D Kudla	5	6	6^{8}
(United States) N Rubin	7	2	7^{10}
(United Kingdom) J Ward	1	1
(Chile) G Lama	6	6
(Brazil) G Clezar	7	6
(United States) R Harrison	5	2
(Argentina) N Kicker	6	6
8	(United States) J Donaldson	2	1
3	(Austria) G Melzer	6	1	6
(Brazil) T Monteiro	2	6	4
(Republic of Ireland) J McGee	7^{7}	3	6
(United States) T Paul	6^{5}	6	4
Q	(Ecuador) E Gómez	3	6	2
(France) Q Halys	6	4	6
(United States) F Tiafoe	6	6
5	(United States) T Smyczek	4	3

Second round
(United States) N Rubin	6	7^{7}
(Chile) G Lama	0	6^{4}
(Brazil) G Clezar	7^{9}	6
(Argentina) N Kicker	6^{7}	1
3	(Austria) G Melzer	6	7^{7}
(Republic of Ireland) J McGee	0	6^{5}
(France) Q Halys	6	4	6
(United States) F Tiafoe	1	6	3

Quarterfinals
(United States) N Rubin	3	0
(Brazil) G Clezar	6	6
3	(Austria) G Melzer	5	6	6
(France) Q Halys	7	4	1

Semifinals
(Brazil) G Clezar	7^{7}	4	2^{r}
3	(Austria) G Melzer	6^{4}	6	3

=== Bottom half ===
First round
6	(United States) B Fratangelo	6	6
(Ecuador) G Lapentti	4	4
WC	(Russia) D Tursunov	4	4
(United States) D Novikov	6	6
Q	(Hungary) P Nagy	6	2	3
Q	(Argentina) T Lipovšek Puches	3	6	6
(Argentina) G Andreozzi	4
4	(Georgia (country)) N Basilashvili	1^{r}
7	(Argentina) F Argüello	2	6	6
WC	(United States) Connor Smith	6	2	2
(Germany) M Zverev	6	6
WC	(United States) S Bangoura	3	1
WC	(United States) E Escobedo	6^{5}	1
(Switzerland) H Laaksonen	7^{7}	6
Q	(Dominican Republic) J Hernández	1	3
2	(Argentina) D Schwartzman	6	6

Second round
6	(United States) B Fratangelo	6	6
(United States) D Novikov	4	4
Q	(Argentina) T Lipovšek Puches	7^{7}	1	6
(Argentina) G Andreozzi	6^{2}	6	2
7	(Argentina) F Argüello	7	4	1^{r}
(Germany) M Zverev	5	6	3
(Switzerland) H Laaksonen	6	6^{5}	6
2	(Argentina) D Schwartzman	4	7^{7}	4

Quarterfinals
6	(United States) B Fratangelo	6	6
Q	(Argentina) T Lipovšek Puches	4	1
(Germany) M Zverev	2	6	7
(Switzerland) H Laaksonen	6	3	5

Semifinals
6	(United States) B Fratangelo	2	4
(Germany) M Zverev	6	6
