= 2017 Sarasota Open – Doubles =

Doubles
- 2017 Sarasota Open

Final
- Champions: (United States) Scott Lipsky; (Austria) Jürgen Melzer
- Runners-up: (United States) Stefan Kozlov; (Canada) Peter Polansky
- Score: 6–2, 6–4

Events
Singles	Doubles
- Sarasota Open

Facundo Argüello and Nicolás Kicker were the defending champions but only Argüello chose to defend his title, partnering Gonzalo Escobar. Argüello withdrew in the qualifying competition.

Scott Lipsky and Jürgen Melzer won the title after defeating Stefan Kozlov and Peter Polansky 6–2, 6–4 in the final.

== Seeds ==
1. (Chile) Julio Peralta / (Argentina) Horacio Zeballos (semifinals)
2. (India) Leander Paes / (Brazil) André Sá (quarterfinals)
3. (Mexico) Santiago González / (New Zealand) Michael Venus (semifinals)
4. (Australia) Matt Reid / (Australia) John-Patrick Smith (first round)

== Draw ==
Key

- Q = Qualifier
- WC = Wild card
- LL = Lucky loser
- Alt = Alternate
- ITF = ITF entry
- PR = Protected ranking
- SR = Special ranking
- SE = Special exempt
- JE = Junior exempt
- JR = Junior Accelerator Programme entrant
- CO = College Accelerator Programme entrant
- NG = Next Gen Accelerator Program entrant
- w/o = Walkover
- r = Retired
- d = Defaulted

First round

Quarterfinals

Semifinals

Final

1
- (Chile) J Peralta
- (Argentina) H Zeballos
6
3
[10]

PR
- (United States) B Klahn
- (United States) D Kudla
2
6
[8]

1
- (Chile) J Peralta
- (Argentina) H Zeballos
7^{7}
6

Q
- (Argentina) F Coria
- (Argentina) T Lipovšek Puches
6
2
[10]

Q
- (Argentina) F Coria
- (Argentina) T Lipovšek Puches
6^{4}
4

- (United States) M Schnur
- (United Kingdom) N Skupski
4
6
[8]

1
- (Chile) J Peralta
- (Argentina) H Zeballos
6^{9}
2

4
- (Australia) M Reid
- (Australia) J-P Smith
6
5
[2]

- (United States) S Lipsky
- (Austria) J Melzer
7^{11}
6

- (United States) S Lipsky
- (Austria) J Melzer
0
7
[10]

- (United States) S Lipsky
- (Austria) J Melzer
7
7

- (Argentina) M González
- (Argentina) L Mayer
7
6

- (Argentina) M González
- (Argentina) L Mayer
5
5

WC
(United States) Russell Benkaim
(United States) William Howells
5
1

- (United States) S Lipsky
- (Austria) J Melzer
6
6

- (Argentina) G Andreozzi
- (El Salvador) M Arévalo
6
6

- (United States) S Kozlov
- (Canada) P Polansky
2
4

WC
- (United States) S Korda
- (United States) P Kypson
2
2

- (Argentina) G Andreozzi
- (El Salvador) M Arévalo
1
6
[5]

- (Barbados) D King
- (United States) M Krueger
3
1

3
- (Mexico) S González
- (New Zealand) M Venus
6
4
[10]

3
- (Mexico) S González
- (New Zealand) M Venus
6
6

3
- (Mexico) S González
- (New Zealand) M Venus
3
6
[3]

- (United States) S Kozlov
- (Canada) P Polansky
1
6
[11]

- (United States) S Kozlov
- (Canada) P Polansky
6
1
[10]

WC
- (United States) S Bangoura
- (United States) M McDonald
6
2
[9]

- (United States) S Kozlov
- (Canada) P Polansky
6
3
[10]

- (Peru) S Galdós
- (United States) D Novikov
1
3

2
- (India) L Paes
- (Brazil) A Sá
3
6
[7]

2
- (India) L Paes
- (Brazil) A Sá
6
6
