= 2019 Sarasota Open – Doubles =

Doubles
- 2019 Sarasota Open

Final
- Champions: (Uruguay) Martín Cuevas (Italy) Paolo Lorenzi
- Runners-up: (United Kingdom) Luke Bambridge (United Kingdom) Jonny O'Mara
- Score: 7–6^{(7–5)}, 7–6^{(8–6)}

Events
| Singles | Doubles |
- Sarasota Open

Evan King and Hunter Reese were the defending champions but only Reese chose to defend his title, partnering André Göransson. Reese lost in the first round to Treat Huey and Fabrice Martin.

Martín Cuevas and Paolo Lorenzi won the title after defeating Luke Bambridge and Jonny O'Mara 7–6^{(7–5)}, 7–6^{(8–6)} in the final.

== Seeds ==
1. (United Kingdom) Luke Bambridge / (United Kingdom) Jonny O'Mara (final)
2. (India) Jeevan Nedunchezhiyan / (India) Purav Raja (first round)
3. (United States) Nathaniel Lammons / (Pakistan) Aisam-ul-Haq Qureshi (semifinals)
4. (Venezuela) Roberto Maytín / (Brazil) Fernando Romboli (quarterfinals)

== Draw ==
Key

- Q = Qualifier
- WC = Wild card
- LL = Lucky loser
- Alt = Alternate
- ITF = ITF entry
- PR = Protected ranking
- SR = Special ranking
- SE = Special exempt
- JE = Junior exempt
- JR = Junior Accelerator Programme entrant
- CO = College Accelerator Programme entrant
- NG = Next Gen Accelerator Program entrant
- w/o = Walkover
- r = Retired
- d = Defaulted

First round
1 | (United Kingdom) L Bambridge (United Kingdom) J O'Mara | 6 | 3 | [10]
(United States) T Sandgren (United Kingdom) J Ward | 2 | 6 | [6]
(United States) A Lawson (Canada) P Polansky | 7^{7} | 6
ITF | (Switzerland) S Ehrat (Russia) A Zhurbin | 6^{2} | 2
3 | (United States) N Lammons (Pakistan) A-u-H Qureshi | 7^{7} | 6
WC | (United States) JC Aragone (United States) M Giron | 6^{5} | 4
(Sweden) A Göransson (United States) H Reese | 6 | 3 | [5]
PR | (Philippines) T Huey (France) F Martin | 4 | 6 | [10]
(Finland) H Heliövaara (Switzerland) H Laaksonen
(Uruguay) M Cuevas (Italy) P Lorenzi | w/o
ITF | (France) A Rinderknech (Kazakhstan) D Yevseyev | 6^{2} | 7^{7} | [7]
4 | (Venezuela) R Maytín (Brazil) F Romboli | 7^{7} | 6^{3} | [10]
(United States) M Krueger (Australia) M Reid | 7 | 7^{7}
WC | (United States) Russell Berdusco (United States) Micah Braswell | 5 | 6^{2}
WC | (Bolivia) B Arias (United States) S Bangoura | 5 | 7 | [10]
2 | (India) J Nedunchezhiyan (India) P Raja | 7 | 5 | [5]

Quarterfinals
1 | (United Kingdom) L Bambridge (United Kingdom) J O'Mara | 6 | 6
(United States) A Lawson (Canada) P Polansky | 3 | 3
3 | (United States) N Lammons (Pakistan) A-u-H Qureshi | 6^{4} | 6 | [10]
PR | (Philippines) T Huey (France) F Martin | 7^{7} | 4 | [8]
(Uruguay) M Cuevas (Italy) P Lorenzi | 6^{5} | 7 | [10]
4 | (Venezuela) R Maytín (Brazil) F Romboli | 7^{7} | 5 | [7]
(United States) M Krueger (Australia) M Reid | 4 | 4
WC | (Bolivia) B Arias (United States) S Bangoura | 6 | 6

Semifinals
1 | (United Kingdom) L Bambridge (United Kingdom) J O'Mara | 6 | 6
3 | (United States) N Lammons (Pakistan) A-u-H Qureshi | 4 | 2
(Uruguay) M Cuevas (Italy) P Lorenzi | 6 | 7^{7}
WC | (Bolivia) B Arias (United States) S Bangoura | 4 | 6^{3}

Final
1 | (United Kingdom) L Bambridge (United Kingdom) J O'Mara | 6^{5} | 6^{6}
(Uruguay) M Cuevas (Italy) P Lorenzi | 7^{7} | 7^{8}
