= 2024 Sarasota Open =

- Date: 8–14 April
- Edition: 14th
- Surface: Clay (green)
- Location: Sarasota, Florida, United States

Champions

Singles
- (Australia) Thanasi Kokkinakis

Doubles
- (United States) Tristan Boyer / (United Kingdom) Oliver Crawford
- Sarasota Open

The 2024 Sarasota Open was a professional tennis tournament played on clay courts. It was the 14th edition of the tournament which was part of the 2024 ATP Challenger Tour. It took place in Sarasota, Florida, United States between April 8 and April 14, 2024.

== Singles main-draw entrants ==
=== Seeds ===
Country	Player	Rank^{1}	Seed
USA	J. J. Wolf	96	1
PER	Juan Pablo Varillas	101	2
AUS	Thanasi Kokkinakis	104	3
BEL	Zizou Bergs	111	4
~~USA~~	~~Michael Mmoh~~	~~123~~	~~5~~
USA	Patrick Kypson	133	6
CAN	Gabriel Diallo	150	7
USA	Denis Kudla	160	8

- ^{1} Rankings are as of April 1, 2024.

=== Other entrants ===
The following players received wildcards into the singles main draw:

- (Canada) Gabriel Diallo
- (United States) Toby Kodat
- (United States) Bruno Kuzuhara

The following players received entry into the singles main draw as alternates:

- (United States) Mitchell Krueger
- (United States) Tennys Sandgren

The following players received entry from the qualifying draw:

- (United States) Kaylan Bigun
- (United States) Felix Corwin
- (Italy) Giovanni Fonio
- (Argentina) Federico Agustín Gómez
- (United States) Stefan Kozlov
- (Croatia) Matija Pecotić

The following players received entry as lucky losers:

- (South Korea) Gerard Campaña Lee
- (Norway) Viktor Durasovic

== Champions ==
=== Singles ===
- (Australia) Thanasi Kokkinakis def. (Belgium) Zizou Bergs 6–3, 1–6, 6–0.

=== Doubles ===
- (United States) Tristan Boyer / (United Kingdom) Oliver Crawford def. (United States) Ethan Quinn / (United States) Tennys Sandgren 6–4, 6–2.
