= 2017 Sarasota Open =

- Date: 17 – 23 April
- Edition: 9th
- Draw: 32S / 16D
- Prize money: $100,000
- Surface: Clay (Green)
- Location: Sarasota, United States

Champions

Singles
- (United States) Frances Tiafoe

Doubles
- (United States) Scott Lipsky / (Austria) Jürgen Melzer
- Sarasota Open

The 2017 Sarasota Open was a professional tennis tournament played on clay courts. It was the 9th edition of the tournament and part of the 2017 ATP Challenger Tour. It took place in Sarasota, United States between April 17, 2017 and April 23, 2017.

== Singles main-draw entrants ==
=== Seeds ===
Country	Player	Rank^{1}	Seed
USA	Jared Donaldson	73	1
ARG	Horacio Zeballos	87	2
USA	Frances Tiafoe	89	3
CZE	Adam Pavlásek	98	4
AUT	Gerald Melzer	105	5
BAR	Darian King	112	6
SUI	Henri Laaksonen	113	7
ARG	Guido Andreozzi	125	8

- ^{1} Rankings are as of April 10, 2017.

=== Other entrants ===
The following players received wildcards into the singles main draw:

- (United States) Sekou Bangoura
- (United States) Christian Harrison
- (United States) Sebastian Korda
- (United States) Mackenzie McDonald

The following players received entry into the singles main draw as special exempts:

- (Italy) Andrea Arnaboldi
- (Serbia) Miomir Kecmanović

The following players received entry from the qualifying draw:

- (Argentina) Facundo Argüello
- (Colombia) Daniel Elahi Galán
- (Slovenia) Blaž Rola
- (Brazil) João Pedro Sorgi

The following player received entry as a lucky loser:

- (United States) Stefan Kozlov

== Champions ==
=== Singles ===
- (United States) Frances Tiafoe def. (United States) Tennys Sandgren 6–3, 6–4.

=== Doubles ===
- (United States) Scott Lipsky / (Austria) Jürgen Melzer def. (United States) Stefan Kozlov / (Canada) Peter Polansky 6–2, 6–4.
