= 2019 Sarasota Open – Singles =

Singles
- 2019 Sarasota Open

Final
- Champion: (United States) Tommy Paul
- Runner-up: (United States) Tennys Sandgren
- Score: 6–3, 6–4

Events
Singles	Doubles
- Sarasota Open

Tommy Paul won the title after defeating Tennys Sandgren 6–3, 6–4 in the final.

Hugo Dellien was the defending champion but lost in the third round to Aslan Karatsev.

== Seeds ==
All seeds receive a bye into the second round.

1. (Bolivia) Hugo Dellien (third round)
2. (United States) Tennys Sandgren (final)
3. (United States) Bradley Klahn (second round)
4. (Norway) Casper Ruud (withdrew)
5. (Italy) Paolo Lorenzi (quarterfinals)
6. (Switzerland) Henri Laaksonen (third round)
7. (United States) Bjorn Fratangelo (third round)
8. (Canada) Peter Polansky (quarterfinals)
9. (United States) Noah Rubin (third round, retired)
10. (Australia) Marc Polmans (second round)
11. (United States) Marcos Giron (semifinals)
12. (United States) Mitchell Krueger (second round)
13. (Germany) Dominik Köpfer (second round)
14. (United Kingdom) James Ward (second round)
15. (United States) Tommy Paul (champion)
16. (Germany) Mats Moraing (second round)

== Draw ==
Key

- Q = Qualifier
- WC = Wild card
- LL = Lucky loser
- Alt = Alternate
- ITF = ITF entry
- PR = Protected ranking
- SR = Special ranking
- SE = Special exempt
- JE = Junior exempt
- JR = Junior Accelerator Programme entrant
- CO = College Accelerator Programme entrant
- NG = Next Gen Accelerator Program entrant
- w/o = Walkover
- r = Retired
- d = Defaulted

=== Finals ===
Quarterfinals
ITF	(Russia) Aslan Karatsev	5	6	4^{r}
(Argentina) Andrea Collarini	7	4	5
15	(United States) Tommy Paul	6	4	6
5	(Italy) Paolo Lorenzi	3	6	4
11	(United States) Marcos Giron	6	6
WC	(United States) Sebastian Korda	1	4
8	(Canada) Peter Polansky	6^{4}	3
2	(United States) Tennys Sandgren	7^{7}	6

Semifinals
(Argentina) Andrea Collarini	1	3
15	(United States) Tommy Paul	6	6
11	(United States) Marcos Giron	6^{2}	6	2
2	(United States) Tennys Sandgren	7^{7}	2	6

Final
15	(United States) Tommy Paul	6	6
2	(United States) Tennys Sandgren	3	4

=== Top half ===
==== Section 1 ====
First round
WC	(Dominican Republic) N Hardt	3	6	6
(United States) Mi Redlicki	6	3	3
ITF	(United States) S Bangoura	5	7^{7}	1
ITF	(Russia) A Karatsev	7	6^{4}	6
(Argentina) A Collarini	6	6
ITF	(Switzerland) S Ehrat	4	0
(Netherlands) J Sels	7^{7}	2	3
(India) S Nagal	6^{5}	6	6

Second round
1	(Bolivia) H Dellien	6	6
WC	(Dominican Republic) N Hardt	4	2
ITF	(Russia) A Karatsev	6	7^{8}
16	(Germany) M Moraing	3	6^{6}
12	(United States) M Krueger	6^{5}	6	6^{5}
(Argentina) A Collarini	7^{7}	4	7^{7}
(India) S Nagal	3	6	6^{2}
7	(United States) B Fratangelo	6	3	7^{7}

Third round
1	(Bolivia) H Dellien	6^{4}	2
ITF	(Russia) A Karatsev	7^{7}	6
(Argentina) A Collarini	6	1	6
7	(United States) B Fratangelo	4	6	3

Quarterfinals
ITF	(Russia) A Karatsev	5	6	4^{r}
(Argentina) A Collarini	7	4	5

==== Section 2 ====
First round
(Colombia) DE Galán	7	6
Q	(United States) Z Khan	5	2
(Portugal) G Elias	6	6
(Denmark) M Torpegaard	2	1
(Uruguay) M Cuevas	6	6
(Colombia) A González	4	2
ITF	(Russia) A Zhurbin	2	4
(Ecuador) E Gómez	6	6

Second round
3	(United States) B Klahn	3	3
(Colombia) DE Galán	6	6
(Portugal) G Elias	1	2
15	(United States) T Paul	6	6
9/WC	(United States) N Rubin	3	7	6
(Uruguay) M Cuevas	6	5	1
(Ecuador) E Gómez	4	6^{5}
5	(Italy) P Lorenzi	6	7^{7}

Third round
(Colombia) DE Galán	6	1	1
15	(United States) T Paul	2	6	6
9/WC	(United States) N Rubin	6	6^{4}	1^{r}
5	(Italy) P Lorenzi	2	7^{7}	4

Quarterfinals
15	(United States) T Paul	6	4	6
5	(Italy) P Lorenzi	3	6	4

=== Bottom half ===
==== Section 3 ====
First round
(Colombia) S Giraldo	5	6	6
(United States) T-S Kwiatkowski	7	1	4
ITF	(France) A Rinderknech	6	4	6
(Kazakhstan) D Yevseyev	3	6	3
WC	(United States) S Korda	7^{9}	6
(United States) U Blanch	6^{7}	3
(United States) Evan Song	6	6
(United States) JC Aragone	3	0

Second round
6	(Switzerland) H Laaksonen	6	6
(Colombia) S Giraldo	4	4
ITF	(France) A Rinderknech	5	6^{4}
11	(United States) M Giron	7	7^{7}
14	(United Kingdom) J Ward	4	7^{7}	1
WC	(United States) S Korda	6	6^{3}	6
(United States) E Song	2	6	0
Alt	(Australia) A Vukic	6	3	6

Third round
6	(Switzerland) H Laaksonen	6^{3}	6	3
11	(United States) M Giron	7^{7}	1	6
WC	(United States) S Korda	6	2	6
Alt	(Australia) A Vukic	4	6	4

Quarterfinals
11	(United States) M Giron	6	6
WC	(United States) S Korda	1	4

==== Section 4 ====
First round
(Russia) E Karlovskiy	7^{7}	4	4
(United States) C Altamirano	6^{4}	6	6
WC	(United States) Jared Hiltzik	1	2
WC	(United States) J Brooksby	6	6
Q	(Finland) H Heliövaara	2	4
(Brazil) G Clezar	6	6
PR	(United States) D Nguyen	6^{5}	5
(United States) R Shane	7^{7}	7

Second round
8	(Canada) P Polansky	6	6
(United States) C Altamirano	1	4
WC	(United States) J Brooksby	6	6
10	(Australia) M Polmans	3	0
13	(Germany) D Köpfer	7^{7}	3	5
(Brazil) G Clezar	6^{2}	6	7
(United States) R Shane	6	6^{6}	6^{4}
2	(United States) T Sandgren	3	7^{8}	7^{7}

Third round
8	(Canada) P Polansky	6	3	7^{8}
WC	(United States) J Brooksby	2	6	6^{6}
(Brazil) G Clezar	6^{5}	2
2	(United States) T Sandgren	7^{7}	6

Quarterfinals
8	(Canada) P Polansky	6^{4}	3
2	(United States) T Sandgren	7^{7}	6
