= 2016 Sarasota Open =

- Date: 11 – 17 April
- Edition: 8th
- Draw: 32S / 16D
- Prize money: $100,000
- Surface: Green clay
- Location: Sarasota, United States

Champions

Singles
- (Germany) Mischa Zverev

Doubles
- (Argentina) Facundo Argüello / (Argentina) Nicolás Kicker
- Sarasota Open

The 2016 Sarasota Open was a professional tennis tournament played on clay courts. It was the 8th edition of the tournament which was part of the 2016 ATP Challenger Tour. It took place in Sarasota, Florida, United States between April 11 and April 17, 2016.

== Singles main-draw entrants ==
=== Seeds ===
Country	Player	Rank^{1}	Seed
USA	Denis Kudla	59	1
ARG	Diego Schwartzman	88	2
AUT	Gerald Melzer	117	3
GEO	Nikoloz Basilashvili	121	4
USA	Tim Smyczek	125	5
USA	Bjorn Fratangelo	131	6
ARG	Facundo Argüello	139	7
USA	Jared Donaldson	142	8

- ^{1} Rankings are as of April 4, 2016

=== Other entrants ===
The following players received wildcards into the singles main draw:

- (United States) Sekou Bangoura
- (United States) Ernesto Escobedo
- (United States) Connor Smith
- (Russia) Dmitry Tursunov

The following players received entry from the qualifying draw:

- (Ecuador) Emilio Gómez
- (Dominican Republic) José Hernández
- (Argentina) Tomás Lipovšek Puches
- (Hungary) Péter Nagy

== Champions ==
=== Singles ===
- (Germany) Mischa Zverev def. (Austria) Gerald Melzer, 6–4, 7–6^{(7–2)}

=== Doubles ===
- (Argentina) Facundo Argüello / (Argentina) Nicolás Kicker def. (El Salvador) Marcelo Arévalo / (Peru) Sergio Galdós, 4–6, 6–4, [10–6]
