= 2014 Sarasota Open =

- Date: 14 – 20 April
- Edition: 6th
- Draw: 32S / 16D
- Prize money: $100,000
- Surface: Green clay
- Location: Sarasota, Florida, United States

Champions

Singles
- (Australia) Nick Kyrgios

Doubles
- (Croatia) Marin Draganja / (Finland) Henri Kontinen
- Sarasota Open

The 2014 Sarasota Open was a professional tennis tournament played on clay courts. It was the sixth edition of the tournament which was part of the 2014 ATP Challenger Tour. It took place in Sarasota, Florida, United States between April 14 and April 20, 2014.

== Singles main-draw entrants ==
=== Seeds ===
Country	Player	Rank	Seed
RUS	Alex Bogomolov Jr.	85	1
USA	Donald Young	91	2
USA	Jack Sock	94	3
USA	Michael Russell	97	4
USA	Tim Smyczek	103	5
USA	Alex Kuznetsov	124	6
ARG	Facundo Bagnis	132	7
CAN	Peter Polansky	135	8

=== Other entrants ===
The following players received wildcards into the singles main draw:

- (United States) Sekou Bangoura
- (United States) Mac Styslinger
- (United States) Daniel Kosakowski
- (United States) Jarmere Jenkins

The following players received entry from the qualifying draw:

- (France) Gianni Mina
- (Japan) Naoki Nakagawa
- (Croatia) Antonio Veić
- (Germany) Alexander Zverev

== Doubles main-draw entrants ==
=== Seeds ===
Country	Player	Country	Player	Rank	Seed
USA	Scott Lipsky	NZL	Michael Venus	110	1
CRO	Marin Draganja	FIN	Henri Kontinen	122	2
GBR	Ken Skupski	GBR	Neal Skupski	132	3
GER	Gero Kretschmer	GER	Alexander Satschko	167	4

=== Other entrants ===
The following pairs received wildcards into the doubles main draw:

- (United States) Sekou Bangoura / (United States) Vahid Mirzadeh
- (United States) Siddhartha Chappidi / (Germany) Joel Link
- (United States) Jarmere Jenkins / (United States) Mac Styslinger

The following pairs received entry from the qualifying draw:

- (Spain) Rubén Ramírez Hidalgo / (Croatia) Franko Škugor

== Champions ==
=== Singles ===
- (Australia) Nick Kyrgios def. (Serbia) Filip Krajinović, 7–6^{(12–10)}, 6–4

=== Doubles ===
- (Croatia) Marin Draganja / (Finland) Henri Kontinen def. (Spain) Rubén Ramírez Hidalgo / (Croatia) Franko Škugor, 7–5, 5–7, [10–6]
