= 2019 Sarasota Open =

- Date: 15–21 April
- Edition: 11th
- Draw: 48S / 16D
- Surface: Clay (Green)
- Location: Sarasota, Florida, United States

Champions

Singles
- (United States) Tommy Paul

Doubles
- (Uruguay) Martín Cuevas / (Italy) Paolo Lorenzi
- Sarasota Open

The 2019 Sarasota Open was a professional tennis tournament played on clay courts. It was the 11th edition of the tournament which was part of the 2019 ATP Challenger Tour. It took place in Sarasota, Florida, United States between April 15 and April 21, 2019.

== Singles main-draw entrants ==
=== Seeds ===
Country	Player	Rank^{1}	Seed
BOL	Hugo Dellien	76	1
USA	Tennys Sandgren	81	2
USA	Bradley Klahn	93	3
~~NOR~~	~~Casper Ruud~~	~~95~~	~~4~~
ITA	Paolo Lorenzi	108	5
SUI	Henri Laaksonen	126	6
USA	Bjorn Fratangelo	127	7
CAN	Peter Polansky	130	8
USA	Noah Rubin	144	9
AUS	Marc Polmans	161	10
USA	Marcos Giron	165	11
USA	Mitchell Krueger	173	12
GER	Dominik Köpfer	181	13
GBR	James Ward	184	14
USA	Tommy Paul	204	15
GER	Mats Moraing	206	16

- ^{1} Rankings are as of April 8, 2019.

=== Other entrants ===
The following players received wildcards into the singles main draw:

- (United States) Jenson Brooksby
- (Dominican Republic) Nick Hardt
- (United States) Jared Hiltzik
- (United States) Sebastian Korda
- (United States) Noah Rubin

The following player received entry into the singles main draw using a protected ranking:

- (United States) Daniel Nguyen

The following player received entry into the singles main draw as an alternate:

- (Australia) Aleksandar Vukic

The following players received entry into the singles main draw using their ITF World Tennis Ranking:

- (United States) Sekou Bangoura
- (Switzerland) Sandro Ehrat
- (Russia) Aslan Karatsev
- (France) Arthur Rinderknech
- (Russia) Alexander Zhurbin

The following players received entry from the qualifying draw:

- (Finland) Harri Heliövaara
- (United States) Zane Khan

== Champions ==
=== Singles ===
- (United States) Tommy Paul def. (United States) Tennys Sandgren 6–3, 6–4.

=== Doubles ===
- (Uruguay) Martín Cuevas / (Italy) Paolo Lorenzi def. (United Kingdom) Luke Bambridge / (United Kingdom) Jonny O'Mara 7–6^{(7–5)}, 7–6^{(8–6)}.
