= 2026 Sarasota Open =

- Date: 6–12 April
- Edition: 16th
- Surface: Clay (green)
- Location: Bradenton, Florida, United States

Champions

Singles
- (China) Wu Yibing

Doubles
- (Czech Republic) Hynek Bartoň / (United States) Martin Damm
- Sarasota Open

The 2026 Elizabeth Moore Sarasota Open was a professional tennis tournament played on clay courts. It was the 16th edition of the tournament which was part of the 2026 ATP Challenger Tour. It took place in Bradenton, Florida, United States between April 6 and 12, 2026.

== Singles main-draw entrants ==
=== Seeds ===
Country	Player	Rank^{1}	Seed
CHN	Wu Yibing	118	1
USA	Martin Damm	126	2
BOL	Hugo Dellien	160	3
USA	Colton Smith	164	4
ARG	Federico Agustín Gómez	182	5
EST	Daniil Glinka	184	6
FRA	Clément Tabur	187	7
USA	Nishesh Basavareddy	193	8

- ^{1} Rankings are as of March 30, 2026.

=== Other entrants ===
The following players received wildcards into the singles main draw:

- (United States) Cannon Kingsley
- (Japan) Kei Nishikori
- (United States) J. J. Wolf

The following player received entry into the singles main draw through the Next Gen Accelerator programme:

- (France) Thomas Faurel

The following players received entry from the qualifying draw:

- (Morocco) Reda Bennani
- (Canada) Liam Draxl
- (Switzerland) Kilian Feldbausch
- (United States) Garrett Johns
- (United States) Strong Kirchheimer
- (United States) Bruno Kuzuhara

== Champions ==
=== Singles ===
- (China) Wu Yibing def. (United States) Stefan Dostanic 6–1, 4–6, 6–3.

=== Doubles ===
- (Czech Republic) Hynek Bartoň / (United States) Martin Damm def. (United States) Garrett Johns / (United States) Theodore Winegar 6–2, 6–1.
