= 2010 Sarasota Open =

- Date: May 10–16, 2010
- Edition: 2nd
- Location: Longboat Key, Florida, United States

Champions

Singles
- (Japan) Kei Nishikori

Doubles
- (United States) Brian Battistone / (United States) Ryler DeHeart
- Sarasota Open

The 2010 Sarasota Open was a professional tennis tournament played on outdoor green clay courts. It was part of the 2010 ATP Challenger Tour. It took place in Longboat Key, Florida, United States between May 10 and May 16, 2010.

== Singles main draw entrants ==
=== Seeds ===
Nationality	Player	Ranking*	Seeding
USA	Taylor Dent	105	1
USA	Jesse Levine	108	2
AUS	Carsten Ball	115	3
ARG	Brian Dabul	124	4
USA	Kevin Kim	132	5
USA	Ryan Sweeting	134	6
USA	Donald Young	158	7
USA	Alex Kuznetsov	162	8

- Rankings are as of May 3, 2010.

=== Other entrants ===
The following players received wildcards into the singles main draw:

- (United States) Sekou Bangoura
- (United States) Vamsee Chappidi
- (United States) Bobby Reynolds
- (United States) Michael Venus

The following players received entry from the qualifying draw:

- (Mexico) Daniel Garza
- (Australia) Dayne Kelly
- (Sweden) Michael Ryderstedt
- (Australia) Matt Reid

The following players received the lucky loser spots:

- (United States) Nicholas Monroe
- (Mexico) Bruno Rodríguez

The following players received special exempt into the main draw:

- (Japan) Kei Nishikori
- (Australia) Joseph Sirianni

== Champions ==
=== Singles ===
(Japan) Kei Nishikori def. (Argentina) Brian Dabul, 2–6, 6–3, 6–4

=== Doubles ===
(United States) Brian Battistone / (United States) Ryler DeHeart def. (Germany) Gero Kretschmer / (Germany) Alex Satschko, 5–7, 7–6(4), [10–8]
