= Mac Styslinger =

American tennis player

- Country (sports): United States
- Born: September 6, 1993 (age 33) Birmingham, Alabama
- Height: 6 ft 4 in (193 cm)
- Plays: Right-handed
- Prize money: $18,768

Singles
- Career record: 0–0
- Highest ranking: No. 1066 (July 22, 2013)

Doubles
- Career record: 0–1
- Highest ranking: No. 873 (April 21, 2014)

Grand Slam doubles results
- US Open: 1R (2013)

Mac Styslinger (born September 6, 1993) is an American former professional tennis player.

Styslinger grew up in the Birmingham suburb of Mountain Brook and trained at the IMG Bollettieri Academy in Florida. He is the son of tennis player Mark Styslinger, a two-time All-American for SMU who also achieved a world ranking.

A top-30 junior, Styslinger made the boys' singles quarter-finals of the 2011 Australian Open, beating Nick Kyrgios en route. He played collegiate tennis for the University of Virginia and was a member of three NCAA championship teams. In 2013 he teamed up with Jarmere Jenkins to win the NCAA doubles championships. This earned them a wildcard to the doubles main draw of the 2013 US Open, where they fell in the first round to Michaël Llodra and Nicolas Mahut.

== ITF Futures titles ==
=== Doubles: (2) ===
No.	Date	Tournament	Surface	Partner	Opponents	Score
1.	Jun 2013	USA F16, Amelia Island	Clay	(United States) Jarmere Jenkins	(El Salvador) Marcelo Arévalo (Venezuela) Roberto Maytín	6–4, 6–2
2.	Jun 2016	USA F17, Charlottesville	Hard	(United States) Thai-Son Kwiatkowski	(Australia) Greg Jones (New Zealand) Rubin Statham	6–4, 6–1
