= Sarasota Open =

- 2025 Sarasota Open

ATP Challenger Tour
- Event name: Sarasota
- Location: Sarasota, Florida, United States
- Venue: Longboat Key Club and Resort's Tennis Gardens (2009–2014); Lakewood Ranch Athletic Center (2015–2016); United Tennis Center (2008, 2017); Laurel Oak Country Club (2018–2019); Payne Park Tennis Center (2022–2024); Sarasota Sports Club (2025–)
- Category: ATP Challenger Tour
- Surface: Clay (green)
- Draw: 32S/32Q/16D/4Q
- Prize money: $100,000 (2025), $82,000
- Website: Website

The Sarasota Open is a professional tennis tournament played on green clay courts. It is currently part of the Association of Tennis Professionals (ATP) Challenger Tour. From 2022 through 2024, the event was held at the Payne Park Tennis Center in Sarasota, Florida, United States. Starting in 2025, the event is being held at the Sarasota Sports Club. It has been held at the United Tennis Center in Bradenton, Florida in its inaugural event (named Hurricane Open) in 2008 and in 2017. Other locations were Longboat Key (2009–2014) and Lakewood Ranch (2015–2016). An expected move to Bath and Racquet Athletic Club near Bee Ridge and U.S. 41 fell through as the tournament was moved to United Tennis Center in 2017. After 2 years off due to the COVID-19 and owners changing, the Sarasota Open announced a comeback in 2022. Under new management, the tournament made another move from their previous location at Laurel Oak Country Club (2018–2019) to Payne Park in 2022.

In 2025 a book was published about the storied history of the tournament titled, The Sarasota Open Experience.

== Past finals ==
=== Singles ===
Year	Champion	Runner-up	Score
2026	(China) Wu Yibing	(United States) Stefan Dostanic	6–1, 4–6, 6–3
2025	(United States) Emilio Nava	(Canada) Liam Draxl	6–2, 7–6^{(7–2)}
2024	(Australia) Thanasi Kokkinakis	(Belgium) Zizou Bergs	6–3, 1–6, 6–0
2023	(Germany) Daniel Altmaier	(Colombia) Daniel Elahi Galán	7–6^{(7–1)}, 6–1
2022	(Colombia) Daniel Elahi Galán	(United States) Steve Johnson	7–6^{(9–7)}, 4–6, 6–1
2020–2021	Not held		
2019	(United States) Tommy Paul	(United States) Tennys Sandgren	6–3, 6–4
2018	(Bolivia) Hugo Dellien	(Argentina) Facundo Bagnis	2–6, 6–4, 6–2
2017	(United States) Frances Tiafoe	(United States) Tennys Sandgren	6–3, 6–4
2016	(Germany) Mischa Zverev	(Austria) Gerald Melzer	6–4, 7–6^{(7–2)}
2015	(Argentina) Federico Delbonis	(Argentina) Facundo Bagnis	6–4, 6–2
2014	(Australia) Nick Kyrgios	(Serbia) Filip Krajinović	7–6^{(12–10)}, 6–4
2013	(United States) Alex Kuznetsov	(United States) Wayne Odesnik	6–0, 6–2
2012	(United States) Sam Querrey	(Italy) Paolo Lorenzi	6–1, 6–7^{(3–7)}, 6–3
2011	(United States) James Blake	(United States) Alex Bogomolov Jr.	6–2, 6–2
2010	(Japan) Kei Nishikori	(Argentina) Brian Dabul	2–6, 6–3, 6–4
2009	(United Kingdom) James Ward	(Australia) Carsten Ball	7–6(4), 4–6, 6–3
2008	(United States) Jesse Levine	(United States) Robert Kendrick	6–3, 5–7, 7–6(3)

=== Doubles ===
Year	Champions	Runners-up	Score
2026	(Czech Republic) Hynek Bartoň (United States) Martin Damm	(United States) Garrett Johns (United States) Theodore Winegar	6–2, 6–1
2025	(United States) Robert Cash (United States) JJ Tracy	(Argentina) Federico Agustín Gómez (Venezuela) Luis David Martínez	6–4, 7–6^{(7–3)}
2024	(United States) Tristan Boyer (United Kingdom) Oliver Crawford	(United States) Ethan Quinn (United States) Tennys Sandgren	6–4, 6–2
2023	(United Kingdom) Julian Cash (United Kingdom) Henry Patten	(Argentina) Guido Andreozzi (Argentina) Guillermo Durán	7–6^{(7–4)}, 6–4
2022	(United States) Robert Galloway (United States) Jackson Withrow	(Sweden) André Göransson (United States) Nathaniel Lammons	6–3, 7–6^{(7–3)}
2020–2021	Not held		
2019	(Uruguay) Martín Cuevas (Italy) Paolo Lorenzi	(United Kingdom) Luke Bambridge (United Kingdom) Jonny O'Mara	7–6^{(7–5)}, 7–6^{(8–6)}
2018	(United States) Evan King (United States) Hunter Reese	(United States) Christian Harrison (Canada) Peter Polansky	6–1, 6–2
2017	(United States) Scott Lipsky (Austria) Jürgen Melzer	(United States) Stefan Kozlov (Canada) Peter Polansky	6–2, 6–4
2016	(Argentina) Facundo Argüello (Argentina) Nicolás Kicker	(El Salvador) Marcelo Arévalo (Peru) Sergio Galdós	4–6, 6–4, [10–6]
2015	(Argentina) Facundo Argüello (Argentina) Facundo Bagnis	(South Korea) Chung Hyeon (India) Divij Sharan	3–6, 6–2, [13–11]
2014	(Croatia) Marin Draganja (Finland) Henri Kontinen	(Spain) Rubén Ramírez Hidalgo (Croatia) Franko Škugor	7–5, 5–7, [10–6]
2013	(Serbia) Ilija Bozoljac (India) Somdev Devvarman	(United States) Steve Johnson (United States) Bradley Klahn	6–7^{(5–7)}, 7–6^{(7–3)}, [11–9]
2012	(Sweden) Johan Brunström (South Africa) Izak van der Merwe	(Germany) Martin Emmrich (Sweden) Andreas Siljeström	6–4, 6–1
2011	(Australia) Ashley Fisher (Australia) Stephen Huss	(United States) Alex Bogomolov Jr. (United States) Alex Kuznetsov	6–3, 6–4
2010	(United States) Brian Battistone (United States) Ryler DeHeart	(Germany) Gero Kretschmer (Germany) Alex Satschko	5–7, 7–6(4), [10–8]
2009	(Dominican Republic) Víctor Estrella (Mexico) Santiago González	(India) Harsh Mankad (United States) Kaes Van't Hof	6–2, 6–4
2008	(Australia) Carsten Ball (United States) Lester Cook	(United States) Ryler DeHeart (United States) Todd Widom	4–6, 6–3, [10–6]
