= Kei Nishikori career statistics =

Career finals
Discipline	Type	Won	Lost	Total
Singles	Grand Slam	–	1	1
Singles	ATP Finals	–	–	–
Singles	ATP 1000	–	4	4
Singles	ATP 500	6	6	12
Singles	ATP 250	6	4	9
Singles	Olympics	–	–	–
Singles	Total	12	15	27
Doubles	Grand Slam	–	–	–
Doubles	ATP Finals	–	–	–
Doubles	ATP 1000	–	–	–|
Doubles	ATP 500	–	–	–
Doubles	ATP 250	–	1	1
Doubles	Olympics	–	–	–
Doubles	Total	0	1	1

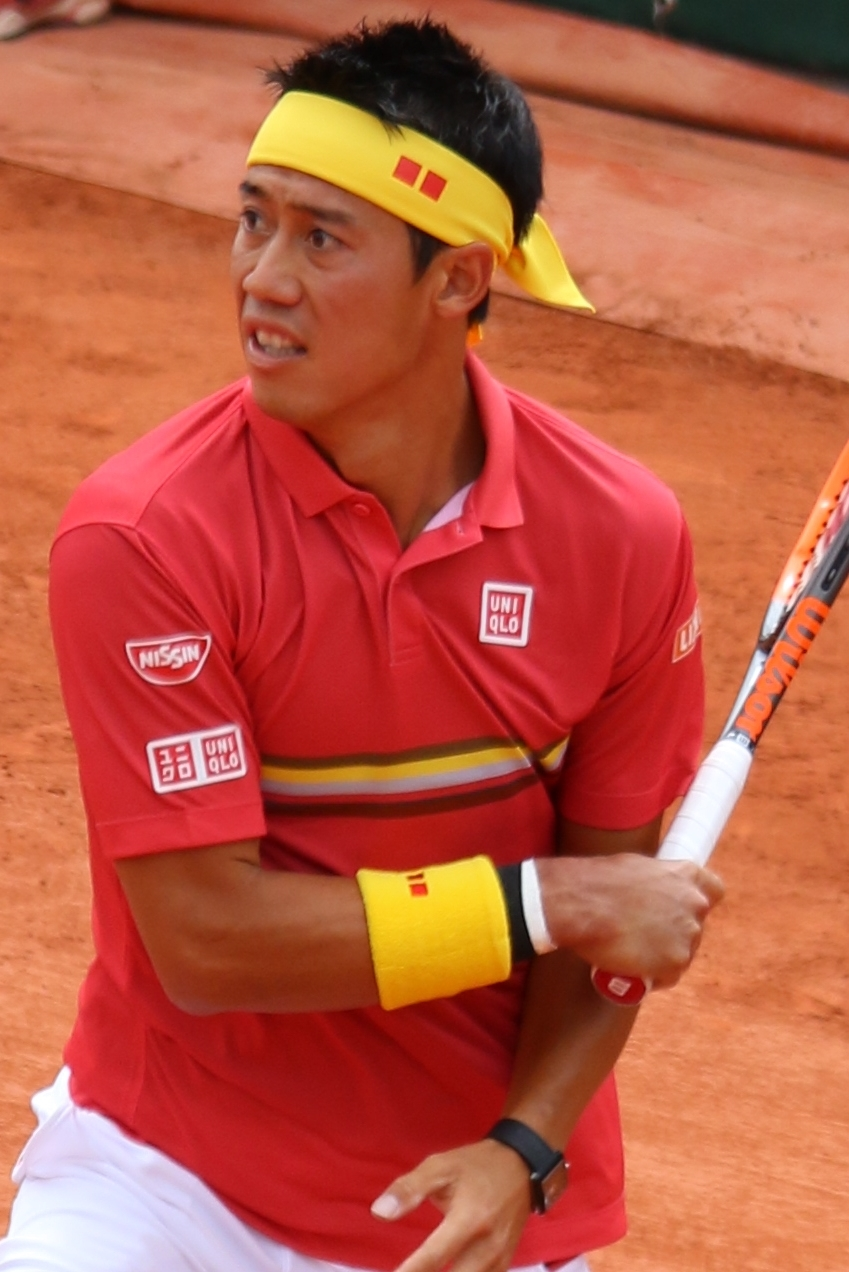
Nishikori at the 2018 French Open.

This is a list of the main career statistics of former Japanese professional tennis player, Kei Nishikori. To date, Nishikori has won 12 ATP singles titles including a record four consecutive titles at the Memphis Open. Other highlights of Nishikori's career thus far include reaching the finals of the 2014 Mutua Madrid Open, 2016 Miami Open, 2016 Rogers Cup and 2014 US Open, semifinal appearances at the 2014 ATP World Tour Finals and 2016 US Open, in addition to quarterfinal finishes at the 2012 Australian Open, 2015 Australian Open, 2016 Australian Open and 2015 French Open. Nishikori achieved a career high singles ranking of world No. 4 on 2 March 2015.

== Performance timeline ==
Key
W	F	SF	QF	#R	RR	Q#	DNQ	A	NH

(W) winner; (F) finalist; (SF) semifinalist; (QF) quarterfinalist; (#R) rounds 4, 3, 2, 1; (RR) round-robin stage; (Q#) qualification round; (DNQ) did not qualify; (A) absent; (NH) not held; (SR) strike rate (events won / competed); (W–L) win–loss record.
To avoid confusion and double counting, these charts are updated at the conclusion of a tournament or when the player's participation has ended.

Tournament	2007	2008	2009	2010	2011	2012	2013	2014	2015	2016	2017	2018	2019	2020	2021	2022	2023	2024	2025	2026	SR	W–L	Win%
Grand Slam tournaments
Australian Open	A	A	1R	A	3R	QF	4R	4R	QF	QF	4R	A	QF	A	1R	A	A	A	2R	A	0 / 11	28–11	72%
French Open	A	Q2	A	2R	2R	A	4R	1R	QF	4R	QF	4R	QF	2R	4R	A	A	2R	A	A	0 / 12	27–12	69%
Wimbledon	A	1R	A	1R	1R	3R	3R	4R	2R	4R	3R	QF	QF	NH	2R	A	A	1R	A	A	0 / 13	22–12	65%
US Open	Q2	4R	A	3R	1R	3R	1R	F	1R	SF	A	SF	3R	A	3R	A	A	A	A	Q3	0 / 11	27–11	71%
Win–loss	0–0	3–2	0–1	3–3	3–4	8–3	8–4	12–4	8–3	15–4	9–3	12–3	14–4	1–1	6–4	0–0	0–0	1–2	1–1	0–0	0 / 47	104–46	69%
Year-end championships
ATP Finals	DNQ							SF	RR	SF	DNQ	RR	DNQ								0 / 4	5–9	36%
ATP Masters 1000
Indian Wells Masters	A	1R	1R	A	1R	2R	3R	3R	4R	QF	QF	A	3R	NH	2R	A	A	A	2R	A	0 / 12	13–12	52%
Miami Open	A	1R	A	A	2R	4R	4R	SF	QF	F	QF	3R	2R	NH	3R	A	A	1R	A	A	0 / 12	22–11	67%
Monte-Carlo Masters	A	A	A	A	A	3R	A	A	A	A	A	F	2R	NH	A	A	A	A	A	A	0 / 3	7–3	70%
Madrid Open	A	A	A	A	1R	A	QF	F	SF	SF	QF	1R	3R	NH	2R	A	A	A	2R	A	0 / 10	19–9	68%
Italian Open	A	A	A	A	Q2	A	2R	A	QF	SF	3R	QF	QF	2R	3R	A	A	A	A	A	0 / 8	14–8	64%
Canadian Open	Q1	A	A	A	A	2R	3R	A	SF	F	2R	1R	2R	NH	2R (Note: Nishikori gave a walkover in the second-round match at the 2021 Canadian Open to Hubert Hurkacz.)	A	A	QF	A	Q1	0 / 9	13–8	65%
Cincinnati Masters	A	A	A	A	1R	3R	1R	A	A	3R	A	2R	2R	A	A	A	A	A	1R	Q2	0 / 7	4–7	36%
Shanghai Masters	NH		A	Q1	SF	2R	3R	2R	3R	A	A	QF	A	NH			A	2R	A	A	0 / 7	11–7	61%
Paris Masters	A	A	A	A	1R	3R	3R	SF	3R	3R	A	QF	A	A	A	A	A	A	A	A	0 / 7	10–6	63%
Win–loss	0–0	0–2	0–1	0–0	5–6	8–6	13–8	13–4	15–7	20–7	9–4	14–8	4–7	1–1	5–4	0–0	0–0	4–3	2–3	0–0	0 / 75	113–71	61%
National representation
Summer Olympics (Note: 2020 Summer Olympics is postponed to 2021 due to COVID-19 pandemic.)	NH	1R	NH			QF	NH			SF-B	NH				QF	NH		1R	NH		0 / 5	11–5	69%
Davis Cup	A	Z1	Z1	A	PO	1R	PO	QF	1R	1R	A	A	A	A	A	A	A	WG1	1R	A	0 / 10	19–4	83%
Career statistics
	2007	2008	2009	2010	2011	2012	2013	2014	2015	2016	2017	2018	2019	2020	2021	2022	2023	2024	2025	2026	Career		
Tournaments (Note: Including appearances in Grand Slam and ATP World Tour main draw matches, in Summer Olympics, and not included in Davis Cup, Laver Cup, ATP Cup and the United Cup.)	5	12	6	9	22	19	20	18	19	20	14	20	15	4	16	0	1	9	9	1	Career total: 239		
Titles	0	1	0	0	0	1	1	4	3	1	0	0	1	0	0	0	0	0	0	0	Career total: 12		
Finals	0	1	0	0	2	1	1	6	4	5	2	3	1	0	0	0	0	0	1	0	Career total: 27		
Hardcourt win–loss	3–5	13–7	3–6	2–5	26–14	23–11	26–13	39–10	35–12	41–16	15–6	25–14	15–8	0–0	17–11	0–0	2–1	7–6	7–7	1–1	10 / 156	302–153	66%
Clay win–loss	0–0	0–1	0–0	1–1	7–5	7–4	8–4	10–2	15–3	13–4	12–5	11–5	10–5	2–4	7–4	0–0	0–0	1–2	3–3	0–0	2 / 55	107–52	67%
Grass win–loss	0–0	3–4	0–0	0–3	3–3	7–3	2–2	5–2	4–1	4–1	3–2	5–2	4–1	0–0	2–2	0–0	0–0	0–1	0–0	0–0	0 / 28	42–27	61%
Carpet win–loss	0–0	0–0	1–0	Discontinued																	0 / 0	1–0	100%
Overall win–loss (Note: Including matches in Grand Slam, in ATP World Tour, in Summer Olympics, in Davis Cup, Laver Cup, ATP Cup and the United Cup.)	3–5	16–12	4–6	3–9	36–22	37–18	36–19	54–14	54–16	58–21	30–13	43–21	29–14	2–4	26–17	0–0	2–1	8–9	10–10	1–1	12 / 239	452–232	66%
Win %	38%	57%	40%	25%	62%	67%	65%	79%	77%	73%	70%	67%	67%	33%	60%	–	67%	47%	50%	50%	Career total: 66%		
Year-end ranking	281	63	421	100	25	19	17	5	8	5	22	9	13	41	47	759	352	106	156	–	$26,225,552		

== Grand Slam tournament finals ==
=== Singles: 1 (1 runner-up) ===
Result	Year	Tournament	Surface	Opponent	Score
Loss	2014	US Open	Hard	(Croatia) Marin Čilić	3–6, 3–6, 3–6

== Other significant finals ==
=== Masters 1000 tournaments ===
==== Singles: 4 (4 runner-ups) ====
Result	Year	Tournament	Surface	Opponent	Score
Loss	2014	Madrid Open	Clay	(Spain) Rafael Nadal	6–2, 4–6, 0–3 ret.
Loss	2016	Miami Open	Hard	(Serbia) Novak Djokovic	3–6, 3–6
Loss	2016	Canadian Open	Hard	(Serbia) Novak Djokovic	3–6, 5–7
Loss	2018	Monte-Carlo Masters	Clay	(Spain) Rafael Nadal	3–6, 2–6

=== Summer Olympics ===
==== Singles: 1 (bronze medal) ====
Result	Year	Tournament	Surface	Opponent	Score
Bronze	2016	Summer Olympics (Rio)	Hard	(Spain) Rafael Nadal	6–2, 6–7^{(1–7)}, 6–3

== ATP Tour finals ==
=== Singles: 27 (12 titles, 15 runner-ups) ===
Legend Grand Slam (0–1) ATP Finals (0–0) ATP Masters 1000 (0–4) ATP 500 (6–6) ATP 250 (International) (6–4)	Finals by surface Hard (10–10) Clay (2–5) Grass (0–0)	Finals by setting Outdoor (7–11) Indoor (5–4)

Result	W–L	Date	Tournament	Tier	Surface	Opponent	Score
Win	1–0	Feb 2008	Delray Beach ITC, US	International	Hard	(United States) James Blake	3–6, 6–1, 6–4
Loss	1–1	Apr 2011	U.S. Men's Clay Court Championships, US	ATP 250	Clay	(United States) Ryan Sweeting	4–6, 6–7^{(3–7)}
Loss	1–2	Nov 2011	Swiss Indoors, Switzerland	ATP 500	Hard (i)	(Switzerland) Roger Federer	1–6, 3–6
Win	2–2	Oct 2012	Japan Open, Japan	ATP 500	Hard	(Canada) Milos Raonic	7–6^{(7–5)}, 3–6, 6–0
Win	3–2	Feb 2013	U.S. National Indoor Tennis Championships, US	ATP 500	Hard (i)	(Spain) Feliciano López	6–2, 6–3
Win	4–2	Feb 2014	U.S. National Indoor Tennis Championships, US (2)	ATP 250	Hard (i)	(Croatia) Ivo Karlović	6–4, 7–6^{(7–0)}
Win	5–2	Apr 2014	Barcelona Open, Spain	ATP 500	Clay	(Colombia) Santiago Giraldo	6–2, 6–2
Loss	5–3	May 2014	Madrid Open, Spain	Masters 1000	Clay	(Spain) Rafael Nadal	6–2, 4–6, 0–3 ret.
Loss	5–4	Sep 2014	US Open, US	Grand Slam	Hard	(Croatia) Marin Čilić	3–6, 3–6, 3–6
Win	6–4	Sep 2014	Malaysian Open, Malaysia	ATP 250	Hard (i)	(France) Julien Benneteau	7–6^{(7–4)}, 6–4
Win	7–4	Oct 2014	Japan Open, Japan (2)	ATP 500	Hard	(Canada) Milos Raonic	7–6^{(7–5)}, 4–6, 6–4
Win	8–4	Feb 2015	Memphis Open, US (3)	ATP 250	Hard (i)	(South Africa) Kevin Anderson	6–4, 6–4
Loss	8–5	Feb 2015	Mexican Open, Mexico	ATP 500	Hard	(Spain) David Ferrer	3–6, 5–7
Win	9–5	Apr 2015	Barcelona Open, Spain (2)	ATP 500	Clay	(Spain) Pablo Andújar	6–4, 6–4
Win	10–5	Aug 2015	Washington Open, US	ATP 500	Hard	(United States) John Isner	4–6, 6–4, 6–4
Win	11–5	Feb 2016	Memphis Open, US (4)	ATP 250	Hard (i)	(United States) Taylor Fritz	6–4, 6–4
Loss	11–6	Apr 2016	Miami Open, US	Masters 1000	Hard	(Serbia) Novak Djokovic	3–6, 3–6
Loss	11–7	Apr 2016	Barcelona Open, Spain	ATP 500	Clay	(Spain) Rafael Nadal	4–6, 5–7
Loss	11–8	Jul 2016	Canadian Open, Canada	Masters 1000	Hard	(Serbia) Novak Djokovic	3–6, 5–7
Loss	11–9	Oct 2016	Swiss Indoors, Switzerland	ATP 500	Hard (i)	(Croatia) Marin Čilić	1–6, 6–7^{(5–7)}
Loss	11–10	Jan 2017	Brisbane International, Australia	ATP 250	Hard	(Bulgaria) Grigor Dimitrov	2–6, 6–2, 3–6
Loss	11–11	Feb 2017	Argentina Open, Argentina	ATP 250	Clay	(Ukraine) Alexandr Dolgopolov	6–7^{(4–7)}, 4–6
Loss	11–12	Apr 2018	Monte-Carlo Masters, Monaco	Masters 1000	Clay	(Spain) Rafael Nadal	3–6, 2–6
Loss	11–13	Oct 2018	Japan Open, Japan	ATP 500	Hard (i)	(Russia) Daniil Medvedev	2–6, 4–6
Loss	11–14	Oct 2018	Vienna Open, Austria	ATP 500	Hard (i)	(South Africa) Kevin Anderson	3–6, 6–7^{(3–7)}
Win	12–14	Jan 2019	Brisbane International, Australia	ATP 250	Hard	(Russia) Daniil Medvedev	6–4, 3–6, 6–2
Loss	12–15	Jan 2025	Hong Kong Open, China SAR	ATP 250	Hard	(France) Alexandre Müller	6–2, 1–6, 3–6

=== Doubles: 1 (1 runner-up) ===
Legend Grand Slam (0–0) ATP Finals (0–0) ATP Masters 1000 (0–0) ATP 500 (0–0) ATP 250 (0–1)	Finals by surface Hard (0–1) Clay (0–0) Grass (0–0)	Finals by setting Outdoor (0–1) Indoor (0–0)

Result	W–L	Date	Tournament	Tier	Surface	Partner	Opponents	Score
Loss	0–1	Jan 2015	Brisbane International, Australia	ATP 250	Hard	(Ukraine) Alexandr Dolgopolov	(United Kingdom) Jamie Murray (Australia) John Peers	3–6, 6–7^{(4–7)}

== ATP Challenger and ITF Futures finals ==
=== Singles: 11 (9 titles, 2 runner-ups) ===
Legend ATP Challenger Tour (8–1) ITF Futures (1–1)	Finals by surface Hard (6–2) Clay (3–0) Grass (0–0) Carpet (0–0)

Result	W–L	Date	Tournament	Tier	Surface	Opponent	Score
Win	1–0	Oct 2006	Mexico F18, Mazatlán	Futures	Hard	(Mexico) Miguel Gallardo Valles	6–2, 6–1
Loss	1–1	Apr 2007	USA F8, Little Rock	Futures	Hard	(United States) Donald Young	2–6, 2–6
Loss	0–1	Jun 2007	Carson, USA	Challenger	Hard	(United States) Alex Bogomolov Jr.	4–6, 3–6
Win	1–1	Apr 2008	Bermuda, Bermuda (UK)	Challenger	Clay	(Serbia) Viktor Troicki	2–6, 7–5, 7–6^{(7–5)}
Win	2–1	May 2010	Savannah, USA	Challenger	Clay	(United States) Ryan Sweeting	6–4, 6–0
Win	3–1	May 2010	Sarasota, USA	Challenger	Clay	(Argentina) Brian Dabul	2–6, 6–3, 6–4
Win	4–1	Aug 2010	Binghamton, USA	Challenger	Hard	(United States) Robert Kendrick	6–3, 7–6^{(7–4)}
Win	5–1	Nov 2010	Knoxville, USA	Challenger	Hard (i)	(United States) Robert Kendrick	6–1, 6–4
Win	6–1	Feb 2018	Dallas, USA	Challenger	Hard (i)	(United States) Mackenzie McDonald	6–1, 6–4
Win	7–1	Jun 2023	Palmas del Mar, Puerto Rico	Challenger	Hard	(United States) Michael Zheng	6–2, 7–5
Win	8–1	Nov 2024	Helsinki, Finland	Challenger	Hard (i)	(Italy) Luca Nardi	3–6, 6–4, 6–1

=== Doubles: 2 (2 titles) ===
Legend ATP Challenger Tour (1–0) ITF Futures (1–0)	Finals by surface Hard (2–0) Clay (0–0) Grass (0–0) Carpet (0–0)

Result	W–L	Date	Tournament	Tier	Surface	Partner	Opponents	Score
Win	1–0	Apr 2007	USA F8, Little Rock	Futures	Hard	(United States) Donald Young	(United States) Brendan Evans (United States) Brian Wilson	7–6^{(7–5)}, 6–4
Win	1–0	Jun 2008	İzmir, Turkey	Challenger	Hard	(United States) Jesse Levine	(United States) Nathan Thompson (Thailand) Danai Udomchoke	6–1, 7–5

== Top 10 wins ==
- He has a 40–78 record against players who were, at the time the match was played, ranked in the top 10.

Season	2008	...	2011	2012	2013	2014	2015	2016	2017	2018	...	2021	Total
Wins	1		3	3	2	11	6	5	1	7		1	40

#	Player	Rank	Event	Surface	Rd	Score	KNR
2008
1.	(Spain) David Ferrer	4	US Open, New York, United States	Hard	3R	6–4, 6–4, 3–6, 2–6, 7–5	126
2011
2.	(France) Jo-Wilfried Tsonga	8	Shanghai, China	Hard	2R	6–7^{(1–7)}, 6–4, 6–4	47
3.	(Czech Republic) Tomáš Berdych	7	Basel, Switzerland	Hard (i)	1R	3–6, 6–3, 6–2	32
4.	(Serbia) Novak Djokovic	1	Basel, Switzerland	Hard (i)	SF	2–6, 7–6^{(7–4)}, 6–0	32
2012
5.	(France) Jo-Wilfried Tsonga	6	Australian Open, Melbourne, Australia	Hard	4R	2–6, 6–2, 6–1, 3–6, 6–3	26
6.	(Spain) David Ferrer	5	Olympics, London, United Kingdom	Grass	3R	6–0, 3–6, 6–4	17
7.	(Czech Republic) Tomáš Berdych	6	Tokyo, Japan	Hard	QF	7–5, 6–4	17
2013
8.	(Switzerland) Roger Federer	2	Madrid, Spain	Clay	3R	6–4, 1–6, 6–2	16
9.	(France) Jo-Wilfried Tsonga	9	Paris, France	Hard (i)	2R	1–6, 7–6^{(7–4)}, 7–6^{(9–7)}	19
2014
10.	(Spain) David Ferrer	4	Miami, United States	Hard	4R	7–6^{(9–7)}, 2–6, 7–6^{(11–9)}	21
11.	(Switzerland) Roger Federer	5	Miami, United States	Hard	QF	3–6, 7–5, 6–4	21
12.	(Canada) Milos Raonic	9	Madrid, Spain	Clay	3R	7–6^{(7–5)}, 7–6^{(7–5)}	12
13.	(Spain) David Ferrer	5	Madrid, Spain	Clay	SF	7–6^{(7–5)}, 5–7, 6–3	12
14.	(Canada) Milos Raonic	6	US Open, New York, United States	Hard	4R	4–6, 7–6^{(7–4)}, 6–7^{(6–8)}, 7–5, 6–4	11
15.	(Switzerland) Stan Wawrinka	4	US Open, New York, United States	Hard	QF	3–6, 7–5, 7–6^{(9–7)}, 6–7^{(5–7)}, 6–4	11
16.	(Serbia) Novak Djokovic	1	US Open, New York, United States	Hard	SF	6–4, 1–6, 7–6^{(7–4)}, 6–3	11
17.	(Canada) Milos Raonic	8	Tokyo, Japan	Hard	F	7–6^{(7–5)}, 4–6, 6–4	7
18.	(Spain) David Ferrer	6	Paris, France	Hard (i)	QF	3–6, 7–6^{(7–5)}, 6–4	7
19.	(United Kingdom) Andy Murray	6	ATP World Tour Finals, London, UK	Hard (i)	RR	6–4, 6–4	5
20.	(Spain) David Ferrer	10	ATP World Tour Finals, London, UK	Hard (i)	RR	4–6, 6–4, 6–1	5
2015
21.	(Spain) David Ferrer	10	Australian Open, Melbourne, Australia	Hard	4R	6–3, 6–3, 6–3	5
22.	(Canada) Milos Raonic	6	Davis Cup, Vancouver, Canada	Hard (i)	RR	3–6, 6–3, 6–4, 2–6, 6–4	4
23.	(Spain) David Ferrer	8	Madrid, Spain	Clay	QF	6–4, 6–2	5
24.	(Croatia) Marin Čilić	8	Washington, D.C., United States	Hard	SF	3–6, 6–1, 6–4	5
25.	(Spain) Rafael Nadal	9	Montreal, Canada	Hard	QF	6–2, 6–4	4
26.	(Czech Republic) Tomáš Berdych	6	ATP World Tour Finals, London, UK	Hard (i)	RR	7–5, 3–6, 6–3	8
2016
27.	(France) Jo-Wilfried Tsonga	10	Australian Open, Melbourne, Australia	Hard	4R	6–4, 6–2, 6–4	7
28.	(Switzerland) Stan Wawrinka	5	Montreal, Canada	Hard	SF	7–6^{(8–6)}, 6–1	6
29.	(Spain) Rafael Nadal	5	Olympics, Rio de Janeiro, Brazil	Hard	BMM	6–2, 6–7^{(1–7)}, 6–3	7
30.	(United Kingdom) Andy Murray	2	US Open, New York, United States	Hard	QF	1–6, 6–4, 4–6, 6–1, 7–5	7
31.	(Switzerland) Stan Wawrinka	3	ATP World Tour Finals, London, UK	Hard (i)	RR	6–2, 6–3	5
2017
32.	(Switzerland) Stan Wawrinka	4	Brisbane, Australia	Hard	SF	7–6^{(7–3)}, 6–3	5
2018
33.	(Croatia) Marin Čilić	3	Monte Carlo, Monaco	Clay	QF	6–4, 6–7^{(1–7)}, 6–3	36
34.	(Germany) Alexander Zverev	4	Monte Carlo, Monaco	Clay	SF	3–6, 6–3, 6–4	36
35.	(Bulgaria) Grigor Dimitrov	4	Rome, Italy	Clay	2R	6–7^{(4–7)}, 7–5, 6–4	24
36.	(Croatia) Marin Čilić	7	US Open, New York, United States	Hard	QF	2–6, 6–4, 7–6^{(7–5)}, 4–6, 6–4	19
37	(Austria) Dominic Thiem	7	Vienna, Austria	Hard (i)	QF	6–3, 6–1	11
38	(South Africa) Kevin Anderson	6	Paris, France	Hard (i)	3R	6–4, 6–4	11
39	(Switzerland) Roger Federer	3	ATP Finals, London, UK	Hard (i)	RR	7–6^{(7–4)}, 6–3	9
2021
40	(Russia) Andrey Rublev	7	Olympics, Tokyo, Japan	Hard	1R	6–3, 6–4	69

== Career Grand Slam tournament seedings ==
Not seeded at all, or not seeded inside the top 10 Seeded 10–4 Seeded no. 3 Seeded no. 2 Seeded no. 1

Year	Australian Open	French Open	Wimbledon	US Open
2008	A	DNQ	–	–
2009	–	A	A	A
2010	A	–	WC	Q
2011	–	–	–	–
2012	24th	A	19th	17th
2013	16th	13th	12th	11th
2014	16th	9th	10th	10th
2015	5th	5th	5th	4th
2016	7th	5th	5th	6th
2017	5th	8th	9th	A
2018	A	19th	24th	21st
2019	8th	7th	8th	7th
2020	A	–	NH	A
2021	–	–	–	–
2022	A	A	A	A
2023	A	A	A	A
2024	A	PR	PR	A
2025	PR	–	–	–
2026	–	–	–	DNQ

* Due to the COVID-19 pandemic, the 2020 Wimbledon Championships of the tournament was cancelled.

== ATP Tour career earnings ==
Year	Majors	ATP wins	Total wins	Earnings ($)	Money list rank
2006	0	0	0	$5,226
2007	0	0	0	$53,623
2008	0	1	1	$303,269
2009	0	0	0	$51,139
2010	0	0	0	$171,394
2011	0	0	0	$773,927	37
2012	0	1	1	$1,044,847	21
2013	0	1	1	$1,180,923	23
2014	0	4	4	$4,439,218	6
2015	0	3	3	$3,302,055	8
2016	0	1	1	$4,806,748	5
2017	0	0	0	$1,441,870	26
2018	0	0	0	$3,763,791	10
2019	0	1	1	$2,173,244	16
2020	0	0	0	$166,322	170
2021	0	0	0	$1,044,859	26
2023	0	0	0	$36,620	529
2024	0	0	0	$547,642	125
2025	0	0	0	$350,428	199
2026	0	0	0	$146,546	309
Career*	0	12	12	$26,225,552	21

* Statistics correct as of 28 September 2026.

== Davis Cup ==
=== Participations: 23 (20–3) ===
Group membership World Group (7–2) WG play-off (8–0) Group I (5–1) Group II (0) Group III (0) Group IV (0)	Matches by Surface Hard (16–2) Clay (2–0) Grass (1–1) Carpet (1–0)	Matches by Type Singles (17–3) Doubles (3–0)

- ▲ ▼ indicates the outcome of the Davis Cup match followed by the score, date, place of event, the zonal classification and its phase, and the court surface.

Rubber outcome	No.	Rubber	Match type (partner if any)	Opponent nation	Opponent player(s)	Score
▼2–3; 11–13 April 2008; R.K. Khanna Tennis Complex, New Delhi, India; Asia/Oceania semifinal; grass surface
Defeat	1	I	Singles	India	Rohan Bopanna	6–7^{(2–7)}, 6–3, 4–6, 6–2, 3–6
Victory	2	IV	Singles (dead rubber)	India	Mahesh Bhupathi	7–5, 6–1
▲5–0; 6–8 March 2009; Namihaya Dome, Kadoma, Osaka, Japan; Asia/Oceania quarterfinal; carpet(i) surface
Victory	3	II	Singles	China	Zhang Ze	6–4, 7–5, 6–2
▲4–1; 8–10 July 2011; Bourbon Beans Dome, Kobe, Hyogo, Japan; Asia/Oceania semifinal; hard(i) surface
Victory	4	II	Singles	Uzbekistan	Farrukh Dustov	6–7^{(2–7)}, 6–3, 6–1, ret.
Victory	5	III	Doubles (with Go Soeda)	Uzbekistan	Murad Inoyatov / Denis Istomin	7–5, 7–6^{(7–5)}, 7–5
Victory	6	IV	Singles	Uzbekistan	Denis Istomin	6–7^{(5–7)}, 7–5, 6–4, 6–3
▲4–1; 16–18 September 2011; Ariake Coliseum, Tokyo, Japan; World Group play-off; hard surface
Victory	7	II	Singles	India	Rohan Bopanna	6–3, 6–2, 6–2
Victory	8	IV	Singles	India	Vishnu Vardhan	7–5, 6–3, 6–3
▼2–3; 10–12 February 2012; Bourbon Beans Dome, Kobe, Hyogo, Japan; World Group first round; hard(i) surface
Defeat	9	II	Singles	Croatia	Ivo Karlović	4–6, 4–6, 3–6
Victory	10	IV	Singles	Croatia	Ivan Dodig	7–5, 7–6^{(7–4)}, 6–3
▼2–3; 14–16 September 2012; Ariake Coliseum, Tokyo, Japan; World Group play-off; hard surface
Victory	11	IV	Singles	Israel	Dudi Sela	6–3, 3–6, 4–6, 6–4, 7–5
▲3–2; 13–15 September 2013; Ariake Coliseum, Tokyo, Japan; World Group play-off; hard surface
Victory	12	I	Singles	Colombia	Alejandro Falla	6–3, 6–4, 6–4
Victory	13	IV	Singles	Colombia	Santiago Giraldo	6–1, 6–2, 6–4
▲4–1; 31 January – 2 February 2014; Ariake Coliseum, Tokyo, Japan; World Group first round; hard(i) surface
Victory	14	I	Singles	Canada	Peter Polansky	6–4, 6–4, 6–4
Victory	15	III	Doubles (with Yasutaka Uchiyama)	Canada	Frank Dancevic / Daniel Nestor	6–3, 7–6^{(7–3)}, 4–6, 6–4
Victory	16	IV	Singles	Canada	Frank Dancevic	6–2, 1–0, ret.
▼2–3; 6–8 March 2015; Doug Mitchell Thunderbird Sports Centre, Vancouver, Canada; World Group first round; hard(i) surface
Victory	17	II	Singles	Canada	Vasek Pospisil	6–4, 7–6^{(7–5)}, 6–3
Victory	18	IV	Singles	Canada	Milos Raonic	3–6, 6–3, 6–4, 2–6, 6–4
▲3–2; 18–20 September 2015; Club Campestre, Pereira, Colombia; World Group play-off; clay surface
Victory	19	II	Singles	Colombia	Alejandro Falla	7–6^{(7–3)}, 7–6^{(7–1)}, 7–5
Victory	20	IV	Singles	Colombia	Santiago Giraldo	6–4, 6–2, 7–6^{(7–3)}
▼1–3; 4–6 March 2016; Barclaycard Arena, Birmingham, Great Britain; World Group first round; hard(i) surface
Victory	21	II	Singles	(United Kingdom) Great Britain	Dan Evans	6–3, 7–5, 7–6^{(7–3)}
Defeat	22	IV	Singles	(United Kingdom) Great Britain	Andy Murray	5–7, 6–7^{(8–6)}, 6–3, 6–4, 3–6
▲5–0; 16–18 September 2016; Utsubo Tennis Center, Osaka, Japan; World Group play-off; hard surface
Victory	23	III	Doubles (with Yūichi Sugita)	Ukraine	Artem Smirnov / Sergiy Stakhovsky	6–3, 6–0, 6–3
