= 1996 XL Bermuda Open – Doubles =

Doubles
- 1996 XL Bermuda Open
- 1995 Champions: (Canada) Grant Connell (United States) Todd Martin

Final
- Champions: (Sweden) Jan Apell (South Africa) Brent Haygarth
- Runners-up: (Australia) Pat Cash (Australia) Patrick Rafter
- Score: 3–6, 6–1, 6–3

Details
- Draw: 16
- Seeds: 4

Events
Singles	Doubles
← 1995 ·	XL Bermuda Open	· 1997 →

Grant Connell and Todd Martin were the defending champions but did not compete that year.

Jan Apell and Brent Haygarth won in the final 3–6, 6–1, 6–3 against Pat Cash and Patrick Rafter.

== Seeds ==
Champion seeds are indicated in bold text while text in italics indicates the round in which those seeds were eliminated.

1. (Sweden) **Jan Apell** / (South Africa) **Brent Haygarth (champions)**
2. (United States) Luke Jensen / (United States) Murphy Jensen (quarterfinals)
3. (Sweden) Rikard Bergh / (United States) Shelby Cannon (first round)
4. (Argentina) Javier Frana / (Czech Republic) Karel Nováček (quarterfinals)

== Draw ==
=== Key ===
- Q = Qualifier
- WC = Wild card
- LL = Lucky loser
- Alt = Alternate
- SE = Special exempt
- PR = Protected ranking
- ITF = ITF entry
- JE = Junior exempt
- w/o = Walkover
- r = Retired
- d = Defaulted
- SR = Special ranking

First round
1	(Sweden) **J Apell** (South Africa) **B Haygarth**	**6**	**6**
(Germany) K Braasch (Germany) D Dier	4	1
Q	(Argentina) **G Etlis** (Brazil) **F Meligeni**	**7**	**6**
(United States) J Belloli (United States) J Pugh	6	2
3	(Sweden) R Bergh (United States) S Cannon	5	6
WC	(Sweden) **M Pernfors** (Sweden) **M Wilander**	**7**	**7**
(United States) **V Spadea** (South Africa) **C van Rensburg**	**6**	3	**6**
(United States) K Flach (United States) B Shelton	2	**6**	3
(United States) T.J. Middleton (United States) C Woodruff	**6**	1	4
WC	(Australia) **P Cash** (Australia) **P Rafter**	4	**6**	**6**
(United States) B Behrens (United States) B Hansen-Dent	**6**	3	2
4	(Argentina) **J Frana** (Czech Republic) **K Nováček**	2	**6**	**6**
(Ecuador) **N Lapentti** (Germany) **S Touzil**	**6**	**6**
(Australia) S Draper (Australia) J Stoltenberg	3	3
WC	(United States) MV Washington (United States) M Washington	1	3
2	(United States) **L Jensen** (United States) **M Jensen**	**6**	**6**

Quarterfinals
1	(Sweden) **J Apell** (South Africa) **B Haygarth**	**6**	3	**7**
Q	(Argentina) G Etlis (Brazil) F Meligeni	2	**6**	5
WC	(Sweden) M Pernfors (Sweden) M Wilander	2	**6**	3
(United States) **V Spadea** (South Africa) **C van Rensburg**	**6**	1	**6**
WC	(Australia) **P Cash** (Australia) **P Rafter**	**6**	**7**
4	(Argentina) J Frana (Czech Republic) K Nováček	3	5
(Ecuador) **N Lapentti** (Germany) **S Touzil**	3	**6**	**6**
2	(United States) L Jensen (United States) M Jensen	**6**	4	3

Semifinals
1	(Sweden) **J Apell** (South Africa) **B Haygarth**	**6**	3	**6**
(United States) V Spadea (South Africa) C van Rensburg	3	**6**	3
WC	(Australia) **P Cash** (Australia) **P Rafter**	**7**	**6**
(Ecuador) N Lapentti (Germany) S Touzil	6	4

Final
1	(Sweden) **Jan Apell** (South Africa) **Brent Haygarth**	3	**6**	**6**
WC	(Australia) Pat Cash (Australia) Patrick Rafter	**6**	1	3
