= 1996 XL Bermuda Open – Singles =

Singles
- 1996 XL Bermuda Open
- 1995 Champion: (Colombia) Mauricio Hadad

Final
- Champion: (United States) MaliVai Washington
- Runner-up: (Uruguay) Marcelo Filippini
- Score: 6–7^{(6–8)}, 6–4, 7–5

Details
- Draw: 32
- Seeds: 8

Events
Singles	Doubles
← 1995 ·	XL Bermuda Open	· 1997 →

Mauricio Hadad was the defending champion but did not compete that year.

MaliVai Washington won in the final 6–7^{(6–8)}, 6–4, 7–5 against Marcelo Filippini.

== Seeds ==
A champion seed is indicated in bold text while text in italics indicates the round in which that seed was eliminated.

1. (United States) **MaliVai Washington (champion)**
2. (Argentina) Javier Frana (semifinals)
3. (Australia) Jason Stoltenberg (first round)
4. (United States) Michael Joyce (first round)
5. (United States) Chris Woodruff (first round)
6. (United States) Vince Spadea (quarterfinals)
7. (Brazil) Fernando Meligeni (first round)
8. (Australia) Scott Draper (first round)

== Draw ==
=== Key ===
- Q = Qualifier
- WC = Wild card
- LL = Lucky loser
- Alt = Alternate
- SE = Special exempt
- PR = Protected ranking
- ITF = ITF entry
- JE = Junior exempt
- w/o = Walkover
- r = Retired
- d = Defaulted
- SR = Special ranking

First round
1	(United States) **M Washington**	**6**	**6**
WC	(United States) L Jensen	3	4
(Russia) A Cherkasov	3	2
Q	(Argentina) **F Squillari**	**6**	**6**
(Sweden) **J Apell**	2	**7**	**6**
WC	(United States) A Reichel	**6**	5	4
Q	(United States) **B Behrens**	**6**	5	**7^{7}**
8	(Australia) S Draper	4	**7**	6^{3}
4	(United States) M Joyce	4	6^{10}
(Germany) **D Dier**	**6**	**7^{12}**
(Ecuador) **N Lapentti**	**7**	3	**6**
(Czech Republic) K Nováček	5	**6**	4
WC	(Sweden) M Pernfors	0	5
Q	(Argentina) **M Zabaleta**	**6**	**7**
(Ecuador) **L Morejón**	4	**7^{8}**	**6**
5	(United States) C Woodruff	**6**	6^{6}	3
6	(United States) **V Spadea**	**6**	3	**6**
(Australia) R Fromberg	4	**6**	3
(Romania) D Pescariu	3	4
(Belgium) **K Goossens**	**6**	**6**
(Uruguay) **M Filippini**	**6**	3	**6**
(Argentina) G Etlis	2	**6**	2
(Australia) **A Ilie**	**6**	**6**
3	(Australia) J Stoltenberg	3	2
7	(Brazil) F Meligeni	2	2
(Sweden) **M Wilander**	**6**	**6**
Q	(Argentina) F Davín	4	**6**	4
(Australia) **P Rafter**	**6**	3	**6**
(Germany) O Gross	1	2
(United States) **B Shelton**	**6**	**6**
(Argentina) M Charpentier	3	2
2	(Argentina) **J Frana**	**6**	**6**

Second round
1	(United States) **M Washington**	**6**	6^{5}	**7^{7}**
Q	(Argentina) F Squillari	1	**7^{7}**	6^{2}
(Sweden) J Apell	2	**7**	6^{4}
Q	(United States) **B Behrens**	**6**	5	**7^{7}**
(Germany) **D Dier**	**6**	**6**
(Ecuador) N Lapentti	2	4
Q	(Argentina) **M Zabaleta**	**6**	**6**
(Ecuador) L Morejón	4	3
6	(United States) **V Spadea**	**6**	**6**
(Belgium) K Goossens	1	3
(Uruguay) **M Filippini**	**6**	**6**
(Australia) A Ilie	4	2
(Sweden) **M Wilander**	**7^{7}**	**6**
(Australia) P Rafter	6^{0}	3
(United States) B Shelton	**7^{7}**	2	2
2	(Argentina) **J Frana**	6^{3}	**6**	**6**

Quarterfinals
1	(United States) **M Washington**	**6**	**6**
Q	(United States) B Behrens	3	4
(Germany) D Dier	6^{4}	2
Q	(Argentina) **M Zabaleta**	**7^{7}**	**6**
6	(United States) V Spadea	4	**6**	4
(Uruguay) **M Filippini**	**6**	3	**6**
(Sweden) M Wilander	4	2
2	(Argentina) **J Frana**	**6**	**6**

Semifinals
1	(United States) **M Washington**	**6**	**7^{7}**
Q	(Argentina) M Zabaleta	4	6^{5}
(Uruguay) **M Filippini**	3	**7**	**6**
2	(Argentina) J Frana	**6**	5	1

Final
1	(United States) **MaliVai Washington**	6^{6}	**6**	**7**
(Uruguay) Marcelo Filippini	**7^{8}**	4	5
