= 1995 XL Bermuda Open – Doubles =

Doubles
- 1995 XL Bermuda Open

Final
- Champions: (Canada) Grant Connell (United States) Todd Martin
- Runners-up: (New Zealand) Brett Steven (Australia) Jason Stoltenberg
- Score: 7–6, 2–6, 7–5

Details
- Draw: 16 (3WC/1Q)
- Seeds: 4

Events
Singles	Doubles
- XL Bermuda Open

Mark Knowles and Jared Palmer, the winners of the 1993 edition, chose not to compete this year. Knowles opted to rest after winning the Tokyo title the previous week.

Grant Connell and Todd Martin won the title by defeating Brett Steven and Jason Stoltenberg 7–6, 2–6, 7–5 in the final.

== Seeds ==
1. (Argentina) Javier Frana / (United States) Patrick McEnroe (semifinals)
2. (South Africa) Ellis Ferreira / (South Africa) Brent Haygarth (first round)
3. (United States) Alex O'Brien / (Australia) Michael Tebbutt (first round)
4. (Austria) Alex Antonitsch / (Germany) Martin Sinner (semifinals)

== Draw ==
Key

- Q = Qualifier
- WC = Wild card
- LL = Lucky loser
- Alt = Alternate
- ITF = ITF entry
- PR = Protected ranking
- SR = Special ranking
- SE = Special exempt
- JE = Junior exempt
- JR = Junior Accelerator Programme entrant
- CO = College Accelerator Programme entrant
- NG = Next Gen Accelerator Program entrant
- w/o = Walkover
- r = Retired
- d = Defaulted

=== Draw ===
First round
1	(Argentina) J Frana (United States) P McEnroe	7	6	6
(United States) D Flach (United States) B Shelton	6	7	3
(Spain) J Arrese (Hungary) L Markovits	3	6	6
(Brazil) O Della (Hungary) G Köves	6	4	4
3	(United States) A O'Brien (Australia) M Tebbutt	6	6	3
(United States) D Johnson (United States) K Thorne	7	3	6
(New Zealand) B Steven (Australia) J Stoltenberg	7	7
WC	(United States) K Flach (United States) R Seguso	6	6
WC	(United States) S Cannon (United States) TJ Middleton	6	7
WC	(United States) B Garnett (United States) V Spadea	4	6
(Argentina) C Miniussi (Venezuela) M Ruah	3	6
4	(Austria) A Antonitsch (Germany) M Sinner	6	7
Q	(Morocco) K Alami (Italy) S Pescosolido	3	6	3
(Argentina) G Etlis (Argentina) D Orsanic	6	3	6
(Canada) G Connell (United States) T Martin	7	6
2	(South Africa) E Ferreira (South Africa) B Haygarth	6	3

Quarterfinals
1	(Argentina) J Frana (United States) P McEnroe	6	6
(Spain) J Arrese (Hungary) L Markovits	2	1
(United States) D Johnson (United States) K Thorne	1	7	6
(New Zealand) B Steven (Australia) J Stoltenberg	6	5	7
WC	(United States) S Cannon (United States) TJ Middleton	6	4	2
4	(Austria) A Antonitsch (Germany) M Sinner	3	6	6
(Argentina) G Etlis (Argentina) D Orsanic	5	6
(Canada) G Connell (United States) T Martin	7	7

Semifinals
1	(Argentina) J Frana (United States) P McEnroe	5	2
(New Zealand) B Steven (Australia) J Stoltenberg	7	6
4	(Austria) A Antonitsch (Germany) M Sinner	3	6	2
(Canada) G Connell (United States) T Martin	6	3	6

Final
(New Zealand) B Steven (Australia) J Stoltenberg	6	6	5
(Canada) G Connell (United States) T Martin	7	2	7
