= 1995 XL Bermuda Open – Singles =

Singles
- 1995 XL Bermuda Open

Final
- Champion: (Colombia) Mauricio Hadad
- Runner-up: (Argentina) Javier Frana
- Score: 7–6^{(7–5)}, 3–6, 6–4

Details
- Draw: 32 (3WC/4Q/1LL)
- Seeds: 8

Events
Singles	Doubles
- XL Bermuda Open

Mikael Pernfors, the winner of the 1993 edition, chose not to compete this year.

Mauricio Hadad won the title by defeating Javier Frana 7–6^{(7–5)}, 3–6, 6–4 in the final.

== Seeds ==
1. (United States) Todd Martin (second round)
2. (Australia) Jason Stoltenberg (quarterfinals)
3. (Germany) Martin Sinner (first round)
4. (New Zealand) Brett Steven (first round)
5. (United States) Vince Spadea (semifinals)
6. (Brazil) Fernando Meligeni (first round)
7. (United States) Patrick McEnroe (first round)
8. (Norway) Christian Ruud (first round)

== Draw ==
Key

- Q = Qualifier
- WC = Wild card
- LL = Lucky loser
- Alt = Alternate
- ITF = ITF entry
- PR = Protected ranking
- SR = Special ranking
- SE = Special exempt
- JE = Junior exempt
- JR = Junior Accelerator Programme entrant
- CO = College Accelerator Programme entrant
- NG = Next Gen Accelerator Program entrant
- w/o = Walkover
- r = Retired
- d = Defaulted

=== Finals ===
Semifinals
(United States) Bryan Shelton	6^{7}	6^{6}
(Colombia) Mauricio Hadad	7^{9}	7^{8}
5	(United States) Vince Spadea	6	3	4
(Argentina) Javier Frana	3	6	6

Final
(Colombia) Mauricio Hadad	7^{7}	3	6
(Argentina) Javier Frana	6^{5}	6	4

=== Top half ===
First round
1	(United States) T Martin	2	6	6
Q	(United States) K Thorne	6	3	4
(Argentina) H Gumy	6	6^{4}	4
(Australia) M Tebbutt	4	7^{7}	6
(Spain) A Mancisidor	2	5
(United States) B Shelton	6	7
(Czech Republic) B Ulihrach	3	7	6
8	(Norway) C Ruud	6	5	2
4	(New Zealand) B Steven	6	4	3
(Colombia) M Hadad	0	6	6
(Sweden) L Jönsson	1	6	7
Q	(United States) A O'Brien	6	2	5
WC	(United States) D Witt	2	4
(Australia) J Morgan	6	6
(Czech Republic) R Vašek	1	6	6
6	(Brazil) F Meligeni	6	4	3

Second round
1	(United States) T Martin	5	3
(Australia) M Tebbutt	7	6
(United States) B Shelton	6	6
(Czech Republic) B Ulihrach	2	2
(Colombia) M Hadad	2	6	6
(Sweden) L Jönsson	6	3	1
(Australia) J Morgan	2	6	7^{7}
(Czech Republic) R Vašek	6	4	6^{2}

Quarterfinals
(Australia) M Tebbutt	6^{1}	6	3
(United States) B Shelton	7^{7}	1	6
(Colombia) M Hadad	6	7^{7}
(Australia) J Morgan	4	6^{3}

Semifinals
(United States) B Shelton	6^{7}	6^{6}
(Colombia) M Hadad	7^{9}	7^{8}

=== Bottom half ===
First round
5	(United States) V Spadea	7	6
(Italy) S Pescosolido	5	2
WC	(Sweden) M Wilander	2	5
(Sweden) C Bergström	6	7
Q	(Brazil) M Carlsson	6	6
WC	(The Bahamas) M Merklein	4	1
(Germany) K Braasch	5	6	6
3	(Germany) M Sinner	7	1	2
7	(United States) P McEnroe	2	6^{5}
(Morocco) K Alami	6	7^{7}
Q	(United States) W McGuire	2	2
(Argentina) J Frana	6	6
(Germany) CU Steeb	3	2
(Spain) J Arrese	6	6
LL	(United States) L Gloria	4	4
2	(Australia) J Stoltenberg	6	6

Second round
5	(United States) V Spadea	6	6
(Sweden) C Bergström	2	2
Q	(Brazil) M Carlsson	3	3
(Germany) K Braasch	6	6
(Morocco) K Alami	0	3
(Argentina) J Frana	6	6
(Spain) J Arrese	2	4
2	(Australia) J Stoltenberg	6	6

Quarterfinals
5	(United States) V Spadea	6	6
(Germany) K Braasch	2	4
(Argentina) J Frana	7^{7}	6
2	(Australia) J Stoltenberg	6^{5}	1

Semifinals
5	(United States) V Spadea	6	3	4
(Argentina) J Frana	3	6	6
