= 1996 XL Bermuda Open =

- Date: 15–21 April
- Edition: 3rd
- Category: World Series
- Draw: 32S / 16D
- Prize money: $303,000
- Surface: Clay / outdoor
- Location: Paget, Bermuda

Champions

Singles
- (United States) MaliVai Washington

Doubles
- (Sweden) Jan Apell / (South Africa) Brent Haygarth
← 1995 ·	XL Bermuda Open	· 1997 →

The 1996 XL Bermuda Open was a men's tennis tournament played on outdoor clay courts in Paget in Bermuda and was part of the World Series of the 1996 ATP Tour. It was the third edition of the tournament and was held from 15 April through 21 April 1996. First-seeded MaliVai Washington won the singles title.

== Finals ==
=== Singles ===
(United States) MaliVai Washington defeated (Uruguay) Marcelo Filippini 6–7^{(6–8)}, 6–4, 7–5

- It was Washington's only title of the year and the 4th of his career.

=== Doubles ===
(Sweden) Jan Apell / (South Africa) Brent Haygarth defeated (Australia) Pat Cash / (Australia) Patrick Rafter 3–6, 6–1, 6–3

- It was Apell's only title of the year and the 9th of his career. It was Haygarth's 1st title of the year and the 3rd of his career.
