= 2017 Argentina Open =

- Date: 13 – 19 February
- Edition: 20th
- Category: ATP World Tour 250 series
- Draw: 28S/16D
- Prize money: $546,680
- Surface: Clay
- Location: Buenos Aires, Argentina

Champions

Singles
- (Ukraine) Alexandr Dolgopolov

Doubles
- (Colombia) Juan Sebastián Cabal / (Colombia) Robert Farah
← 2016 ·	ATP Buenos Aires	· 2018 →

The 2017 Argentina Open was a men's tennis tournament played on outdoor clay courts. It was the 20th edition of the ATP Buenos Aires event, and part of the ATP World Tour 250 series of the 2017 ATP World Tour. It took place in Buenos Aires, Argentina, from February 13 through 19, 2017.

== Points and prize money ==
=== Point distribution ===
Event	W	F	SF	QF	Round of 16	Round of 32	Q	Q2	Q1
Singles	250	150	90	45	20	0	12	6	0
Doubles	250	150	90	45	0	—	—	—	—

=== Prize money ===
Event	W	F	SF	QF	Round of 16	Round of 32	Q2	Q1
Singles	$97,470	$51,355	$27,810	$15,840	$9,335	$5,530	$2,490	$1,240
Doubles	$29,610	$15,570	$8,430	$4,830	$2,830	—	—	—
Doubles prize money per team

== Singles main-draw entrants ==
=== Seeds ===
Country	Player	Rank^{1}	Seed
JPN	Kei Nishikori	5	1
URU	Pablo Cuevas	20	2
ESP	David Ferrer	25	3
ESP	Pablo Carreño Busta	26	4
ESP	Albert Ramos Viñolas	30	5
POR	João Sousa	41	6
ITA	Fabio Fognini	45	7
ITA	Paolo Lorenzi	46	8

- ^{1} Rankings are as of February 6, 2017.

=== Other entrants ===
The following players received wildcards into the main draw:

- (Argentina) Carlos Berlocq
- (Argentina) Leonardo Mayer
- (Serbia) Janko Tipsarević

The following player received entry as a special exempt:

- (Dominican Republic) Víctor Estrella Burgos

The following players received entry from the qualifying draw:

- (Argentina) Guido Andreozzi
- (Brazil) Rogério Dutra Silva
- (Italy) Alessandro Giannessi
- (Slovakia) Jozef Kovalík

=== Retirements ===
- (Argentina) Leonardo Mayer

== Doubles main-draw entrants ==
=== Seeds ===
Country	Player	Country	Player	Rank^{1}	Seed
COL	Juan Sebastián Cabal	COL	Robert Farah	58	1
ESP	Pablo Carreño Busta	URU	Pablo Cuevas	59	2
MEX	Santiago González	ESP	David Marrero	92	3
CHI	Julio Peralta	ARG	Horacio Zeballos	94	4

- ^{1} Rankings are as of February 6, 2017.

=== Other entrants ===
The following pairs received wildcards into the main draw:

- (Argentina) Guido Andreozzi / (Argentina) Nicolás Kicker
- (Argentina) Renzo Olivo / (Argentina) Guido Pella

=== Withdrawals ===
During the tournament

- (Spain) Pablo Carreño Busta

== Finals ==
=== Singles ===
- (Ukraine) Alexandr Dolgopolov defeated (Japan) Kei Nishikori, 7–6^{(7–4)}, 6–4

=== Doubles ===
- (Colombia) Juan Sebastián Cabal / (Colombia) Robert Farah defeated (Mexico) Santiago González / (Spain) David Marrero, 6–1, 6–4
