= 2008 XL Bermuda Open – Singles =

2008 tennis tournament

Singles
- 2008 XL Bermuda Open

Final
- Champion: (Japan) Kei Nishikori
- Runner-up: (Serbia) Viktor Troicki
- Score: 2-6, 7-5, 7-6(5)

Events
Singles	Doubles
← 2007 ·	XL Bermuda Open	· 2009 →

The 2008 XL Bermuda Open singles was a tennis competition event of the Association of Tennis Professionals (ATP), the secondary professional tennis circuit organized by the ATP. The 2008 ATP series calendar comprised 176 tournaments, with prize money ranging from $25,000 up to $150,000.

In the 2008 XL Bermuda Open Mariano Zabaleta was the defending champion.

== Seeds ==
1. (Israel) Dudi Sela (second round)
2. (Spain) Óscar Hernández (first round)
3. (Argentina) Sergio Roitman (first round)
4. (United States) Donald Young (quarterfinals)
5. (United States) John Isner (second round)
6. (Australia) Peter Luczak (semifinals)
7. (Spain) Marcel Granollers Pujol (quarterfinals)
8. (Latvia) Ernests Gulbis (quarterfinals)

== Draws ==
=== Key ===
- Q = Qualifier
- WC = Wild card
- LL = Lucky loser
- Alt = Alternate
- SE = Special exempt
- PR = Protected ranking
- ITF = ITF entry
- JE = Junior exempt
- w/o = Walkover
- r = Retired
- d = Defaulted
- SR = Special ranking

=== Finals ===
Semifinals				Finals
	(Japan) K Nishikori	6	6
6	(Australia) P Luczak	2	4	(Japan) K Nishikori	2	7	7
	(Serbia) V Troicki	6	6	(Serbia) V Troicki	6	5	6^{5}
	(Argentina) C Berlocq	3	4

=== Section 1 ===
First round
1	(Israel) D Sela	6	6
(Czech Republic) J Vacek	3	2
(Japan) K Nishikori	2	6	6
(Brazil) M Daniel	6	4	1
(Chile) N Massú	1	6	6
(Austria) D Köllerer	6	3	4
(United States) A Bogomolov Jr.	1	0
8/WC	(Latvia) E Gulbis	6	6
4	(United States) D Young	6	6
WC	(Australia) G Jones	2	4
(Uruguay) P Cuevas	6	6
(United States) R Ginepri	2	2
(United States) W Odesnik	6	7
Q	(Israel) N Okun	2	6^{4}
WC	(Canada) P Polansky	3	6	3
6	(Australia) P Luczak	6	2	6

Second round
1	(Israel) D Sela	3	3
(Japan) K Nishikori	6	6
(Chile) N Massú	6^{3}	2
8/WC	(Latvia) E Gulbis	7	6
4	(United States) D Young	7	2	7
(Uruguay) P Cuevas	5	6	5
(United States) W Odesnik	2	4
6	(Australia) P Luczak	6	6

Quarter-Finals
(Japan) K Nishikori	6	2	6
8/WC	(Latvia) E Gulbis	2	6	2
4	(United States) D Young	2	2
6	(Australia) P Luczak	6	6

Semi-Finals
(Japan) K Nishikori	6	6
6	(Australia) P Luczak	2	4

=== Section 2 ===
First round
7	(Spain) M Granollers Pujol	6	6
(Argentina) D Hartfield	3	2
(Israel) H Levy	6	6
(Argentina) M Puerta	2	3
Q	(Croatia) F Škugor	6	6
Q	(United States) S Lipsky	3	2
(Serbia) V Troicki	3	6	6
3	(Argentina) S Roitman	6	2	2
5	(United States) J Isner	6	6^{3}	6
(Chile) P Capdeville	2	7	4
(United States) V Spadea	7	6
(Austria) A Haider-Maurer	6^{4}	1
Q	(United States) N Kryvonos	7	7
LL	(United States) D Martin	6^{8}	5
(Argentina) C Berlocq	2	7	3r
2	(Spain) Ó Hernández	6	6^{3}	0

Second round
7	(Spain) M Granollers Pujol	6^{6}	6	6
(Israel) H Levy	7	4	2
Q	(Croatia) F Škugor	1	2
(Serbia) V Troicki	6	6
5	(United States) J Isner	2	6^{4}
(United States) V Spadea	6	7
Q	(United States) N Kryvonos	0	2
(Argentina) C Berlocq	6	6

Quarter-Finals
7	(Spain) M Granollers Pujol	3	6	2
(Serbia) V Troicki	6	0	6
(United States) V Spadea	4	6	4
(Argentina) C Berlocq	6	4	6

Semi-Finals
(Serbia) V Troicki	6	6
(Argentina) C Berlocq	3	4
