= 2017 Brisbane International – Women's doubles =

Coordinates: 27°31′30″S 153°0′26″E

Women's doubles
- 2017 Brisbane International

Final
- Champions: (United States) Bethanie Mattek-Sands (India) Sania Mirza
- Runners-up: (Russia) Ekaterina Makarova (Russia) Elena Vesnina
- Score: 6–2, 6–3

Details
- Draw: 16
- Seeds: 4

Events
Singles	men	women
Doubles	men	women
- Brisbane International

Martina Hingis and Sania Mirza were the defending champions, but Hingis chose not to participate this year. Mirza played alongside Bethanie Mattek-Sands and successfully defended her title, defeating Ekaterina Makarova and Elena Vesnina in the final, 6–2, 6–3.

== Seeds ==
1. (United States) Bethanie Mattek-Sands / (India) Sania Mirza (champions)
2. (Russia) Ekaterina Makarova / (Russia) Elena Vesnina (final)
3. (United States) Abigail Spears / (Slovenia) Katarina Srebotnik (semifinals)
4. (Slovenia) Andreja Klepač / (Spain) María José Martínez Sánchez (quarterfinals)

== Draw ==
Key

- Q = Qualifier
- WC = Wild card
- LL = Lucky loser
- Alt = Alternate
- ITF = ITF entry
- PR = Protected ranking
- SR = Special ranking
- SE = Special exempt
- JE = Junior exempt
- JR = Junior Accelerator Programme entrant
- CO = College Accelerator Programme entrant
- NG = Next Gen Accelerator Program entrant
- w/o = Walkover
- r = Retired
- d = Defaulted

First round
1	(United States) B Mattek-Sands (India) S Mirza	6	6
(France) A Cornet (Belgium) E Mertens	1	1
(Ukraine) K Bondarenko (Kazakhstan) Y Putintseva	2	0
(Romania) I-C Begu (Russia) D Kasatkina	6	6
4	(Slovenia) A Klepač (Spain) MJ Martínez Sánchez	6	6
(Germany) A-L Grönefeld (Czech Republic) K Peschke	1	3
(Chinese Taipei) S-w Hsieh (Germany) L Siegemund	6	6
(United States) C McHale (United States) A Muhammad	2	4
(United States) I Falconi (United States) S Rogers	2	6	[10]
(Georgia (country)) O Kalashnikova (Serbia) A Krunić	6	4	[8]
WC	(Australia) A Barty (Australia) C Dellacqua	7^{7}	2	[17]
3	(United States) A Spears (Slovenia) K Srebotnik	6^{5}	6	[19]
(Italy) S Errani (Ukraine) E Svitolina	6	4	[5]
(Australia) S Stosur (China) S Zhang	1	6	[10]
(Croatia) D Jurak (Australia) An Rodionova	2	2
2	(Russia) E Makarova (Russia) E Vesnina	6	6

Quarterfinals
1	(United States) B Mattek-Sands (India) S Mirza	6	4	[10]
(Romania) I-C Begu (Russia) D Kasatkina	4	6	[5]
4	(Slovenia) A Klepač (Spain) MJ Martínez Sánchez	7^{9}	2	2
(Chinese Taipei) S-w Hsieh (Germany) L Siegemund	6^{7}	6	[10]
(United States) I Falconi (United States) S Rogers	1	6^{5}
3	(United States) A Spears (Slovenia) K Srebotnik	6	7^{7}
(Australia) S Stosur (China) S Zhang
2	(Russia) E Makarova (Russia) E Vesnina	w/o

Semifinals
1	(United States) B Mattek-Sands (India) S Mirza	6	6
(Chinese Taipei) S-w Hsieh (Germany) L Siegemund	4	3
3	(United States) A Spears (Slovenia) K Srebotnik	1	3
2	(Russia) E Makarova (Russia) E Vesnina	6	6

Final
1	(United States) B Mattek-Sands (India) S Mirza	6	6
2	(Russia) E Makarova (Russia) E Vesnina	2	3
