= Simon Touzil =

German tennis player

- Full name: Simon Touzil (Toužil)
- Country (sports): Germany
- Born: 9 July 1972 (age 52); Offenbach, West Germany
- Plays: Right-handed
- Prize money: $35,841

Singles
- Highest ranking: No. 183 (7 June 1993)

Doubles
- Career record: 2–1
- Highest ranking: No. 180 (22 April 1996)

Simon Touzil (born 9 July 1972) is a former professional tennis player from Germany.

== Biography ==
Touzil is the only child of Czechoslovakian immigrants, who came to West Germany four years prior to his birth. He played tennis from the age of three and was a top ten junior in West Germany in the 1980s.

As a professional player he competed mostly on the satellite and Challenger circuits, with his matches including wins over Rainer Schüttler and Franco Squillari. He was runner-up to Dimitri Poliakov at the 1993 Bruck Challenger and lost two Challenger finals in doubles. His only ATP Tour main draw appearance came in the doubles at the 1996 XL Bermuda Open, where he partnered with Nicolás Lapentti to make the semi-finals.
