= 2008 XL Bermuda Open =

- Date: April 21 – April 27
- Edition: 10th

Champions

Singles
- (Japan) Kei Nishikori

Doubles
- (Israel) Harel Levy / (United States) Jim Thomas
← 2007 ·	XL Bermuda Open	· 2009 →

The 2008 XL Bermuda Open was an ATP Challenger Series tournament. It took place in Paget, Bermuda, from April 21 to April 27, 2008.
