= 2018 Argentina Open – Singles =

Singles
- 2018 Argentina Open

Final
- Champion: (Austria) Dominic Thiem
- Runner-up: (Slovenia) Aljaž Bedene
- Score: 6–2, 6–4

Details
- Draw: 28 (4 Q / 3 WC )
- Seeds: 8

Events
Singles	Doubles
- Argentina Open

Alexandr Dolgopolov was the defending champion, but withdrew before the tournament began.

Dominic Thiem won the title, defeating Aljaž Bedene in the final, 6–2, 6–4.

== Seeds ==
The top four seeds receive a bye into the second round.

1. (Austria) Dominic Thiem (champion)
2. (Spain) Pablo Carreño Busta (second round)
3. (Spain) Albert Ramos Viñolas (second round)
4. (Italy) Fabio Fognini (second round)
5. (Argentina) Diego Schwartzman (quarterfinals)
6. (United Kingdom) Kyle Edmund (withdrew)
7. (Uruguay) Pablo Cuevas (first round)
8. (Spain) Fernando Verdasco (second round)

== Draw ==
Key

- Q = Qualifier
- WC = Wild card
- LL = Lucky loser
- Alt = Alternate
- ITF = ITF entry
- PR = Protected ranking
- SR = Special ranking
- SE = Special exempt
- JE = Junior exempt
- JR = Junior Accelerator Programme entrant
- CO = College Accelerator Programme entrant
- NG = Next Gen Accelerator Program entrant
- w/o = Walkover
- r = Retired
- d = Defaulted

=== Finals ===
Semifinals
1	(Austria) Dominic Thiem	6	6
(France) Gaël Monfils	2	1
(Slovenia) Aljaž Bedene	6	2	6
(Argentina) Federico Delbonis	4	6	1

Final
1	(Austria) Dominic Thiem	6	6
(Slovenia) Aljaž Bedene	2	4

=== Top half ===
First round
(Argentina) H Zeballos	6	6
Q	(Italy) M Cecchinato	1	4
WC	(Argentina) N Kicker	6	4	4
(Argentina) G Pella	2	6	6
SE	(Brazil) T Monteiro	2	5
8	(Spain) F Verdasco	6	7
Q	(Brazil) R Dutra Silva	7^{7}	2	4
(Argentina) L Mayer	6^{4}	6	6
(Serbia) D Lajović	7^{7}	6
Q	(Argentina) F Bagnis	6^{4}	1
(France) G Monfils	6	6
7	(Uruguay) P Cuevas	1	4

Second round
1	(Austria) D Thiem	6	6
(Argentina) H Zeballos	4	3
(Argentina) G Pella	6	6
8	(Spain) F Verdasco	2	4
4	(Italy) F Fognini	3	3
(Argentina) L Mayer	6	6
(Serbia) D Lajović	4	3
(France) G Monfils	6	6

Quarterfinals
1	(Austria) D Thiem	7^{9}	6
(Argentina) G Pella	6^{7}	4
(Argentina) L Mayer	4	6	3
(France) G Monfils	6	3	6

Semifinals
1	(Austria) D Thiem	6	6
(France) G Monfils	2	1

=== Bottom half ===
First round
5	(Argentina) D Schwartzman	6	6
PR	(Austria) A Haider-Maurer	4	3
Q	(Brazil) T Bellucci	6	6
WC	(Argentina) P Cachin	2	1
(Czech Republic) J Veselý	0	3
(Slovenia) A Bedene	6	6
LL	(Portugal) G Elias	6	6
SE	(Spain) R Carballés Baena	2	4
(Argentina) F Delbonis	7^{7}	6
(Germany) F Mayer	6^{4}	4
WC	(Argentina) C Berlocq	3	3
(Spain) G García López	6	6

Second round
5	(Argentina) D Schwartzman	3	6	6
Q	(Brazil) T Bellucci	6	3	2
(Slovenia) A Bedene	3	7	6
3	(Spain) A Ramos Viñolas	6	5	1
LL	(Portugal) G Elias	6^{5}	6^{6}
(Argentina) F Delbonis	7^{7}	7^{8}
(Spain) G García López	7^{7}	1	7^{8}
2	(Spain) P Carreño Busta	6^{5}	6	6^{6}

Quarterfinals
5	(Argentina) D Schwartzman	4	4
(Slovenia) A Bedene	6	6
(Argentina) F Delbonis	6	7
(Spain) G García López	3	5

Semifinals
(Slovenia) A Bedene	6	2	6
(Argentina) F Delbonis	4	6	1

== Qualifying ==
=== Seeds ===
1. (United States) Tennys Sandgren (first round)
2. (Italy) Marco Cecchinato (qualified)
3. (Brazil) Rogério Dutra Silva (qualified)
4. (Brazil) Thomaz Bellucci (qualified)
5. (Portugal) Gastão Elias (qualifying competition, lucky loser)
6. (Norway) Casper Ruud (qualifying competition)
7. (Argentina) Renzo Olivo (first round)
8. (Italy) Alessandro Giannessi (first round)

=== Qualifiers ===
1. (Argentina) Facundo Bagnis
2. (Italy) Marco Cecchinato
3. (Brazil) Rogério Dutra Silva
4. (Brazil) Thomaz Bellucci

=== Lucky losers ===
1. (Portugal) Gastão Elias

=== Qualifying draw ===
==== First qualifier ====
First round
1	(United States) Tennys Sandgren	1	2
(Argentina) Facundo Bagnis	6	6
Alt	(Brazil) João Souza	6	3	0
5	(Portugal) Gastão Elias	4	6	6

Qualifying competition
(Argentina) Facundo Bagnis	6^{7}	6	6
5	(Portugal) Gastão Elias	7^{9}	1	1

==== Second qualifier ====
First round
2	(Italy) Marco Cecchinato	6	6
(Argentina) Guido Andreozzi	4	3
(Portugal) João Domingues	1	3
6	(Norway) Casper Ruud	6	6

Qualifying competition
2	(Italy) Marco Cecchinato	6	7^{7}
6	(Norway) Casper Ruud	3	6^{4}

==== Third qualifier ====
First round
3	(Brazil) Rogério Dutra Silva	6^{9}	6	2
Alt	(Argentina) Andrea Collarini	7^{11}	3	1^{r}
Alt	(Brazil) Guilherme Clezar	7	6
7	(Argentina) Renzo Olivo	5	0

Qualifying competition
3	(Brazil) Rogério Dutra Silva	7^{7}	7^{7}
Alt	(Brazil) Guilherme Clezar	6^{5}	6^{5}

==== Fourth qualifier ====
First round
4	(Brazil) Thomaz Bellucci	6	6
WC	(Argentina) Juan Ignacio Galarza	4	4
WC	(Argentina) Hernán Casanova	7^{7}	6
8	(Italy) Alessandro Giannessi	6^{5}	4

Qualifying competition
4	(Brazil) Thomaz Bellucci	6	6
WC	(Argentina) Hernán Casanova	2	4
