= 2017 Brisbane International – Men's doubles =

Men's doubles
- 2017 Brisbane International

Final
- Champions: (Australia) Thanasi Kokkinakis (Australia) Jordan Thompson
- Runners-up: (Luxembourg) Gilles Müller (United States) Sam Querrey
- Score: 7–6^{(9–7)}, 6–4

Details
- Draw: 16
- Seeds: 4

Events
Singles	men	women
Doubles	men	women
- Brisbane International

Henri Kontinen and John Peers were the defending champions, but lost in the first round to Kei Nishikori and Dominic Thiem.
The unseeded team of Thanasi Kokkinakis and Jordan Thompson, who competed in the main draw on a wildcard, won the title, defeating Gilles Müller and Sam Querrey, 7–6^{(9–7)}, 6–4.

== Seeds ==
1. (France) Pierre-Hugues Herbert / (France) Nicolas Mahut (quarterfinals)
2. (Finland) Henri Kontinen / (Australia) John Peers (first round)
3. (South Africa) Raven Klaasen / (United States) Rajeev Ram (quarterfinals)
4. (Canada) Daniel Nestor / (France) Édouard Roger-Vasselin (semifinals)

== Draw ==
Key

- Q = Qualifier
- WC = Wild card
- LL = Lucky loser
- Alt = Alternate
- ITF = ITF entry
- PR = Protected ranking
- SR = Special ranking
- SE = Special exempt
- JE = Junior exempt
- JR = Junior Accelerator Programme entrant
- CO = College Accelerator Programme entrant
- NG = Next Gen Accelerator Program entrant
- w/o = Walkover
- r = Retired
- d = Defaulted

First round
1	(France) P-H Herbert (France) N Mahut	6	6
(Bulgaria) G Dimitrov (Pakistan) A-u-H Qureshi	4	3
(France) L Pouille (Switzerland) S Wawrinka	2	6	[9]
WC	(Australia) T Kokkinakis (Australia) J Thompson	6	2	[11]
4	(Canada) D Nestor (France) É Roger-Vasselin	6	6
(Netherlands) J-J Rojer (Romania) H Tecău	4	4
(United States) S Johnson (Argentina) D Schwartzman	6	6
(France) S Robert (France) G Simon	2	1
WC	(Australia) S Groth (Australia) C Guccione	6	3	[10]
(Serbia) V Troicki (Germany) M Zverev	1	6	[8]
(Croatia) I Dodig (Poland) Ł Kubot	4	7^{9}	[6]
3	(South Africa) R Klaasen (United States) R Ram	6	6^{7}	[10]
(Luxembourg) G Müller (United States) S Querrey	4	6	[10]
(Sweden) R Lindstedt (New Zealand) M Venus	6	1	[5]
(Japan) K Nishikori (Austria) D Thiem	1	6	[12]
2	(Finland) H Kontinen (Australia) J Peers	6	3	[10]

Quarterfinals
1	(France) P-H Herbert (France) N Mahut	6	4	[7]
WC	(Australia) T Kokkinakis (Australia) J Thompson	1	6	[10]
4	(Canada) D Nestor (France) É Roger-Vasselin	6	2	[11]
(United States) S Johnson (Argentina) D Schwartzman	3	6	[9]
WC	(Australia) S Groth (Australia) C Guccione	6	6
3	(South Africa) R Klaasen (United States) R Ram	2	3
(Luxembourg) G Müller (United States) S Querrey	6	7^{7}
(Japan) K Nishikori (Austria) D Thiem	3	6^{1}

Semifinals
WC	(Australia) T Kokkinakis (Australia) J Thompson	6	6
4	(Canada) D Nestor (France) É Roger-Vasselin	3	1
WC	(Australia) S Groth (Australia) C Guccione
(Luxembourg) G Müller (United States) S Querrey	w/o

Final
WC	(Australia) T Kokkinakis (Australia) J Thompson	7^{9}	6
(Luxembourg) G Müller (United States) S Querrey	6^{7}	4
