= 2018 Erste Bank Open – Doubles =

Doubles
- 2018 Erste Bank Open

Final
- Champions: (United Kingdom) Joe Salisbury (United Kingdom) Neal Skupski
- Runners-up: (United States) Mike Bryan (France) Édouard Roger-Vasselin
- Score: 7–6^{(7–5)}, 6–3

Details
- Draw: 16
- Seeds: 4

Events
| Singles | Doubles |
| ← 2017 · | Vienna Open | · 2019 → |

Rohan Bopanna and Pablo Cuevas were the defending champions, but Bopanna chose to compete in Basel and Cuevas chose to compete in Lima instead.

Joe Salisbury and Neal Skupski won the title, defeating Mike Bryan and Édouard Roger-Vasselin in the final, 7–6^{(7–5)}, 6–3. Bryan secured the year-end ATP no. 1 doubles ranking by reaching the final.

== Seeds ==
1. (Austria) Oliver Marach / (Croatia) Mate Pavić (semifinals)
2. (Poland) Łukasz Kubot / (Brazil) Marcelo Melo (semifinals)
3. (Colombia) Juan Sebastián Cabal / (Colombia) Robert Farah (first round)
4. (United Kingdom) Jamie Murray / (Brazil) Bruno Soares (first round)

== Draw ==
=== Key ===
- Q = Qualifier
- WC = Wild card
- LL = Lucky loser
- Alt = Alternate
- SE = Special exempt
- PR = Protected ranking
- ITF = ITF entry
- JE = Junior exempt
- w/o = Walkover
- r = Retired
- d = Defaulted
- SR = Special ranking

=== Draw ===
First round
1 | (Austria) O Marach (Croatia) M Pavić | 6 | 6
WC | (Austria) L Miedler (Austria) D Novak | 3 | 4
(Argentina) M González (Argentina) D Schwartzman | 7 | 3 | [10]
LL | (United States) J Cerretani (United States) D Kudla | 5 | 6 | [6]
3 | (Colombia) JS Cabal (Colombia) R Farah | 7 | 4 | [4]
(United States) M Bryan (France) É Roger-Vasselin | 5 | 6 | [10]
(Spain) F López (Spain) M López | 3 | 6 | [10]
(Finland) H Kontinen (Australia) J Peers | 6 | 3 | [7]
(New Zealand) M Daniell (Netherlands) W Koolhof | 6 | 6^{3} | [4]
(United Kingdom) J Salisbury (United Kingdom) N Skupski | 3 | 7^{7} | [10]
LL | (Germany) A Mies (Chile) H Podlipnik Castillo | 6 | 6
4 | (United Kingdom) J Murray (Brazil) B Soares | 4 | 2
(Czech Republic) R Jebavý (Germany) P Kohlschreiber | 6^{4} | 5
(Croatia) N Mektić (United States) R Ram | 7^{7} | 7
Q | (Ukraine) D Molchanov (Slovakia) I Zelenay | 6 | 5 | [5]
2 | (Poland) Ł Kubot (Brazil) M Melo | 4 | 7 | [10]

Quarterfinals
1 | (Austria) O Marach (Croatia) M Pavić | 6 | 6
(Argentina) M González (Argentina) D Schwartzman | 1 | 0
(United States) M Bryan (France) É Roger-Vasselin | 6 | 7
(Spain) F López (Spain) M López | 4 | 5
(United Kingdom) J Salisbury (United Kingdom) N Skupski | 7^{8} | 6
LL | (Germany) A Mies (Chile) H Podlipnik Castillo | 6^{6} | 3
(Croatia) N Mektić (United States) R Ram | 6 | 4 | [4]
2 | (Poland) Ł Kubot (Brazil) M Melo | 4 | 6 | [10]

Semifinals
1 | (Austria) O Marach (Croatia) M Pavić | 4 | 7^{7} | [7]
(United States) M Bryan (France) É Roger-Vasselin | 6 | 6^{2} | [10]
(United Kingdom) J Salisbury (United Kingdom) N Skupski | 2 | 6 | [10]
2 | (Poland) Ł Kubot (Brazil) M Melo | 6 | 3 | [8]

Final
(United States) M Bryan (France) É Roger-Vasselin | 6^{5} | 3
(United Kingdom) J Salisbury (United Kingdom) N Skupski | 7^{7} | 6

== Qualifying ==
=== Seeds ===
1. (Ukraine) Denys Molchanov / (Slovakia) Igor Zelenay (qualified)
2. (Germany) Andreas Mies / (Chile) Hans Podlipnik Castillo (qualifying competition, lucky losers)

=== Qualifiers ===
1. (Ukraine) Denys Molchanov / (Slovakia) Igor Zelenay

=== Lucky losers ===
1. (Germany) Andreas Mies / (Chile) Hans Podlipnik Castillo
2. (United States) James Cerretani / (United States) Denis Kudla

=== Qualifying draw ===
First round
1 | (Ukraine) Denys Molchanov (Slovakia) Igor Zelenay | 3 | 7^{7} | [10]
WC | (Ukraine) Sergiy Stakhovsky (Austria) Tristan-Samuel Weissborn | 6 | 6^{2} | [3]
(United States) James Cerretani (United States) Denis Kudla | 3 | 2
2 | (Germany) Andreas Mies (Chile) Hans Podlipnik Castillo | 6 | 6

Qualifying competition
1 | (Ukraine) Denys Molchanov (Slovakia) Igor Zelenay | 7^{7} | 6^{4} | [10]
2 | (Germany) Andreas Mies (Chile) Hans Podlipnik Castillo | 6^{4} | 7^{7} | [7]
