= 2018 Erste Bank Open =

- Date: 22–28 October
- Edition: 44th
- Category: ATP World Tour 500 Series
- Draw: 32S / 16D
- Prize money: €2,035,415
- Surface: Hard
- Location: Vienna, Austria
- Venue: Wiener Stadthalle

Champions

Singles
- (South Africa) Kevin Anderson

Doubles
- (United Kingdom) Joe Salisbury / (United Kingdom) Neal Skupski
- Vienna Open

The 2018 Erste Bank Open 500 was a men's tennis tournament played on indoor hard courts. It was the 44th edition of the event, and part of the ATP World Tour 500 Series of the 2018 ATP World Tour. It was held at the Wiener Stadthalle in Vienna, Austria, from 22 October until 28 October 2018. Second-seeded Kevin Anderson won the singles title.

== Finals ==
=== Singles ===
- (South Africa) Kevin Anderson defeated (Japan) Kei Nishikori, 6–3, 7–6^{(7–3)}

=== Doubles ===
- (United Kingdom) Joe Salisbury / (United Kingdom) Neal Skupski defeated (United States) Mike Bryan / (France) Édouard Roger-Vasselin, 7–6^{(7–5)}, 6–3

== Points and prize money ==
=== Point distribution ===
| Event | W | F | SF | QF | Round of 16 | Round of 32 | Q | Q2 | Q1 |
| Singles | 500 | 300 | 180 | 90 | 45 | 0 | 20 | 10 | 0 |
| Doubles | 500 | 300 | 180 | 90 | 0 | —N/a | 45 | 25 | 0 |

== Singles main-draw entrants ==
=== Seeds ===
| Country | Player | Rank^{1} | Seed |
|---|---|---|---|
| AUT | Dominic Thiem | 7 | 1 |
| RSA | Kevin Anderson | 8 | 2 |
| BUL | Grigor Dimitrov | 9 | 3 |
| USA | John Isner | 10 | 4 |
| JPN | Kei Nishikori | 11 | 5 |
| CRO | Borna Ćorić | 13 | 6 |
| ITA | Fabio Fognini | 14 | 7 |
| GBR | Kyle Edmund | 15 | 8 |

- Rankings are as of October 15, 2018

=== Other entrants ===
The following players received wildcards into the singles main draw:

- (Canada) Félix Auger-Aliassime
- (Austria) Jürgen Melzer
- (Austria) Dennis Novak

The following player received entry as a special exempt:

- (France) Gaël Monfils

The following players received entry from the qualifying draw:

- (Belgium) Ruben Bemelmans
- (France) Pierre-Hugues Herbert
- (United States) Denis Kudla
- (Kazakhstan) Mikhail Kukushkin

The following players received entry as lucky losers:

- (United Kingdom) Cameron Norrie
- (Russia) Andrey Rublev

=== Withdrawals ===
Before the tournament

- (Spain) Pablo Carreño Busta → replaced by (United States) Frances Tiafoe
- (South Korea) Chung Hyeon → replaced by (Russia) Andrey Rublev
- (France) Richard Gasquet → replaced by (United Kingdom) Cameron Norrie
- (Australia) Nick Kyrgios → replaced by (Georgia (country)) Nikoloz Basilashvili

During the tournament

- (Austria) Jürgen Melzer

=== Retirements ===
- (Croatia) Borna Ćorić
- (France) Gaël Monfils

== Doubles main-draw entrants ==
=== Seeds ===
| Country | Player | Country | Player | Rank^{1} | Seed |
|---|---|---|---|---|---|
| AUT | Oliver Marach | CRO | Mate Pavić | 5 | 1 |
| POL | Łukasz Kubot | BRA | Marcelo Melo | 8 | 2 |
| COL | Juan Sebastián Cabal | COL | Robert Farah | 15 | 3 |
| GBR | Jamie Murray | BRA | Bruno Soares | 19 | 4 |

  - ^{1} Rankings are as of October 15, 2018

=== Other entrants ===
The following pairs received wildcards into the doubles main draw:

- ~~(Austria) Jürgen Melzer / (Austria) Philipp Oswald~~
- (Austria) Lucas Miedler / (Austria) Dennis Novak

The following pair received entry from the qualifying draw:

- (Ukraine) Denys Molchanov / (Slovakia) Igor Zelenay

The following pairs received entry as lucky losers:

- (United States) James Cerretani / (United States) Denis Kudla
- (Germany) Andreas Mies / (Chile) Hans Podlipnik Castillo

=== Withdrawals ===
Before the tournament

- (United States) John Isner
- (Austria) Jürgen Melzer
