= 2017 Brisbane International =

Coordinates: 27°31′30″S 153°0′26″E

- Date: 1–8 January 2017
- Edition: 9th
- Prize money: $461,330 (men) $1,000,000 (women)
- Surface: Hard / outdoor
- Location: Tennyson, Brisbane, Queensland, Australia
- Venue: Queensland Tennis Centre

Champions

Men's singles
- (Bulgaria) Grigor Dimitrov

Women's singles
- (Czech Republic) Karolína Plíšková

Men's doubles
- (Australia) Thanasi Kokkinakis / (Australia) Jordan Thompson

Women's doubles
- (United States) Bethanie Mattek-Sands / (India) Sania Mirza
- Brisbane International

The 2017 Brisbane International was a tennis tournament of the 2017 ATP World Tour and 2017 WTA Tour. It was played on outdoor hard courts in Brisbane, Queensland, Australia. It was the ninth edition of the tournament and took place at the Queensland Tennis Centre in Tennyson. It was held from 1 to 8 January 2017 as part of the Australian Open Series in preparation for the first Grand Slam of the year.

It was announced on 24 August 2016 that 14-times Grand Slam champion Rafael Nadal would play at the event for the first time.

== Finals ==
=== Men's singles ===
- (Bulgaria) Grigor Dimitrov defeated (Japan) Kei Nishikori, 6–2, 2–6, 6–3
- It was Grigor Dimitrov's fifth career title.

=== Women's singles ===
- (Czech Republic) Karolína Plíšková defeated (France) Alizé Cornet, 6–0, 6–3
- It was Karolína Plíšková's seventh career title.

=== Men's doubles ===
- (Australia) Thanasi Kokkinakis / (Australia) Jordan Thompson defeated (Luxembourg) Gilles Müller / (United States) Sam Querrey, 7–6^{(9–7)}, 6–4

=== Women's doubles ===
- (United States) Bethanie Mattek-Sands / (India) Sania Mirza defeated (Russia) Ekaterina Makarova / (Russia) Elena Vesnina, 6–2, 6–3

== Points and prize money ==
=== Point distribution ===
Event	W	F	SF	QF	Round of 16	Round of 32	Q	Q3	Q2	Q1
Men's singles	250	150	90	45	20	0	12	6	0	0
Men's doubles	250	150	90	45	0	—N/a	—N/a	—N/a	—N/a	—N/a
Women's singles	470	305	185	100	55	1	25	18	13	1
Women's doubles	470	305	185	100	1	—N/a	—N/a	—N/a	—N/a	—N/a

=== Prize money ===
Event	W	F	SF	QF	Round of 16	Round of 32^{1}	Q3	Q2	Q1
Men's singles	$72,000	$37,900	$20,545	$11,705	$6,900	$4,085	$1,840	$920	—N/a
Men's doubles *	$21,850	$11,500	$6,230	$3,570	$2,090	—N/a	—N/a	—N/a	—N/a
Women's singles	$191,418	$102,887	$54,793	$22,877	$12,289	$6,703	$3,494	$1,862	$1,043
Women's doubles *	$46,796	$24,950	$13,654	$6,951	$3,767	—N/a	—N/a	—N/a	—N/a

_{^{1}Qualifiers prize money is also the Round of 32 prize money.}
_{*per team}

== ATP singles main-draw entrants ==
=== Seeds ===
Country	Player	Rank^{1}	Seed
CAN	Milos Raonic	3	1
SUI	Stan Wawrinka	4	2
JPN	Kei Nishikori	5	3
AUT	Dominic Thiem	8	4
ESP	Rafael Nadal	9	5
FRA	Lucas Pouille	15	6
BUL	Grigor Dimitrov	17	7
ESP	David Ferrer	21	8

- ^{1} Rankings as of 26 December 2016.

=== Other entrants ===
The following players received wildcards into the singles main draw:

- (Australia) Sam Groth
- (Australia) Jordan Thompson
- (Sweden) Elias Ymer

The following players received entry from the qualifying draw:

- (Australia) Alex de Minaur
- (United States) Ernesto Escobedo
- (Japan) Yoshihito Nishioka
- (United States) Jared Donaldson

=== Withdrawals ===
Before the tournament

- (South Africa) Kevin Anderson → replaced by (France) Pierre-Hugues Herbert

== ATP doubles main-draw entrants ==
=== Seeds ===
Country	Player	Country	Player	Rank^{1}	Seed
FRA	Pierre-Hugues Herbert	FRA	Nicolas Mahut	3	1
FIN	Henri Kontinen	AUS	John Peers	16	2
RSA	Raven Klaasen	USA	Rajeev Ram	26	3
CAN	Daniel Nestor	FRA	Édouard Roger-Vasselin	32	4

- ^{1} Rankings as of 26 December 2016.

=== Other entrants ===
The following pairs received wildcards into the doubles main draw:

- (Australia) Sam Groth / (Australia) Chris Guccione
- (Australia) Thanasi Kokkinakis / (Australia) Jordan Thompson

== WTA singles main-draw entrants ==
=== Seeds ===
Country	Player	Rank^{1}	Seed
GER	Angelique Kerber	1	1
SVK	Dominika Cibulková	5	2
CZE	Karolína Plíšková	6	3
ESP	Garbiñe Muguruza	7	4
RUS	Svetlana Kuznetsova	9	5
UKR	Elina Svitolina	14	6
RUS	Elena Vesnina	16	7
ITA	Roberta Vinci	18	8

- ^{1} Rankings as of 26 December 2016.

=== Other entrants ===
The following players received wildcards into the singles main draw:

- (Australia) Ashleigh Barty
- (Croatia) Donna Vekić

The following players received entry from the qualifying draw:

- (Australia) Destanee Aiava
- (Serbia) Aleksandra Krunić
- (United States) Bethanie Mattek-Sands
- (United States) Asia Muhammad

The following player received entry as a lucky loser:

- (Ukraine) Kateryna Bondarenko

=== Withdrawals ===
Before the tournament

- (Spain) Carla Suárez Navarro (Shoulder injury) → replaced by (Ukraine) Kateryna Bondarenko

== WTA doubles main-draw entrants ==
=== Seeds ===
Country	Player	Country	Player	Rank^{1}	Seed
USA	Bethanie Mattek-Sands	IND	Sania Mirza	6	1
RUS	Ekaterina Makarova	RUS	Elena Vesnina	14	2
USA	Abigail Spears	SLO	Katarina Srebotnik	48	3
SLO	Andreja Klepač	ESP	María José Martínez Sánchez	71	4

- ^{1} Rankings as of 26 December 2016.

=== Other entrants ===
The following pair received a wildcard into the doubles main draw:

- (Australia) Ashleigh Barty / (Australia) Casey Dellacqua

== Broadcast ==
Selected matches were aired in Australia on 7Two, with live coverage of both day and night sessions.

== See also ==
- 2017 Australian Open Series
