= 2017 Argentina Open – Doubles =

Doubles
- 2017 Argentina Open

Final
- Champions: (Colombia) Juan Sebastián Cabal (Colombia) Robert Farah
- Runners-up: (Mexico) Santiago González (Spain) David Marrero
- Score: 6–1, 6–4

Events
Singles	Doubles
← 2016 ·	Argentina Open	· 2018 →

Juan Sebastián Cabal and Robert Farah were the defending champions and successfully defended their title, defeating Santiago González and David Marrero in the final, 6–1, 6–4.

== Seeds ==
1. (Colombia) Juan Sebastián Cabal / (Colombia) Robert Farah (champions)
2. (Spain) Pablo Carreño Busta / (Uruguay) Pablo Cuevas (semifinals, withdrew)
3. (Mexico) Santiago González / (Spain) David Marrero (final)
4. (Chile) Julio Peralta / (Argentina) Horacio Zeballos (first round)

== Draw ==
=== Key ===
- Q = Qualifier
- WC = Wild card
- LL = Lucky loser
- Alt = Alternate
- SE = Special exempt
- PR = Protected ranking
- ITF = ITF entry
- JE = Junior exempt
- w/o = Walkover
- r = Retired
- d = Defaulted
- SR = Special ranking

=== Draw ===
First round
1	(Colombia) JS Cabal (Colombia) R Farah	6	6
(Portugal) G Elias (Portugal) J Sousa	1	1
WC	(Argentina) R Olivo (Argentina) G Pella	6	6
(Argentina) A Molteni (Argentina) D Schwartzman	3	4
4	(Chile) J Peralta (Argentina) H Zeballos	2	7	[8]
(United States) N Monroe (New Zealand) A Sitak	6	5	[10]
WC	(Argentina) G Andreozzi (Argentina) N Kicker	3	6^{3}
PR	(Italy) S Bolelli (Italy) F Fognini	6	7^{7}
(Argentina) F Delbonis (Argentina) M González	6	6
(Chile) H Podlipnik-Castillo (Spain) A Ramos Viñolas	4	1
(New Zealand) M Daniell (Brazil) M Demoliner	1^{r}
3	(Mexico) S González (Spain) D Marrero	1
(Italy) P Lorenzi (France) S Robert	6	6
PR	(Spain) T Robredo (Brazil) A Sá	2	1
(Argentina) F Bagnis (Argentina) G Durán	6	6^{11}	[4]
2	(Spain) P Carreño Busta (Uruguay) P Cuevas	3	7^{13}	[10]

Quarterfinals
1	(Colombia) JS Cabal (Colombia) R Farah	6	6
WC	(Argentina) R Olivo (Argentina) G Pella	3	3
(United States) N Monroe (New Zealand) A Sitak	6^{3}	7^{7}	[5]
PR	(Italy) S Bolelli (Italy) F Fognini	7^{7}	6^{2}	[10]
(Argentina) F Delbonis (Argentina) M González	5	0
3	(Mexico) S González (Spain) D Marrero	7	6
(Italy) P Lorenzi (France) S Robert	0	2
2	(Spain) P Carreño Busta (Uruguay) P Cuevas	6	6

Semifinals
1	(Colombia) JS Cabal (Colombia) R Farah	4	7^{7}	[10]
PR	(Italy) S Bolelli (Italy) F Fognini	6	6^{0}	[3]
3	(Mexico) S González (Spain) D Marrero	w/o
2	(Spain) P Carreño Busta (Uruguay) P Cuevas

Final
1	(Colombia) JS Cabal (Colombia) R Farah	6	6
3	(Mexico) S González (Spain) D Marrero	1	4
