= 2018 Argentina Open – Doubles =

Doubles
- 2018 Argentina Open

Final
- Champions: (Argentina) Andrés Molteni (Argentina) Horacio Zeballos
- Runners-up: (Colombia) Juan Sebastián Cabal (Colombia) Robert Farah
- Score: 6–3, 5–7, [10–3]

Events
Singles	Doubles
← 2017 ·	Argentina Open	· 2019 →

Juan Sebastián Cabal and Robert Farah were the two-time defending champions, but lost in the final to Andrés Molteni and Horacio Zeballos, 3–6, 7–5, [3–10].

== Seeds ==
1. (Colombia) Juan Sebastián Cabal / (Colombia) Robert Farah (final)
2. (Mexico) Santiago González / (Chile) Julio Peralta (first round)
3. (Croatia) Nikola Mektić / (Austria) Alexander Peya (first round)
4. (Argentina) Andrés Molteni / (Argentina) Horacio Zeballos (champions)

== Draw ==
=== Key ===
- Q = Qualifier
- WC = Wild card
- LL = Lucky loser
- Alt = Alternate
- SE = Special exempt
- PR = Protected ranking
- ITF = ITF entry
- JE = Junior exempt
- w/o = Walkover
- r = Retired
- d = Defaulted
- SR = Special ranking

=== Draw ===
First round
1	(Colombia) JS Cabal (Colombia) R Farah	7^{9}	7^{11}
(Brazil) M Demoliner (Spain) G García López	6^{7}	6^{9}
(Argentina) F Delbonis (Argentina) G Pella	6^{5}	3
(Spain) P Carreño Busta (Uruguay) P Cuevas	7^{7}	6
3	(Croatia) N Mektić (Austria) A Peya	6	3	[8]
(Spain) D Marrero (Spain) F Verdasco	3	6	[10]
(Czech Republic) R Jebavý (Czech Republic) J Veselý	6	2	[3]
(Argentina) D Schwartzman (Austria) D Thiem	3	6	[10]
(Argentina) C Berlocq (Spain) A Ramos Viñolas	3	3
(Chile) H Podlipnik-Castillo (Belarus) A Vasilevski	6	6
WC	(France) D Descloix (France) G Monfils	4	5
4	(Argentina) A Molteni (Argentina) H Zeballos	6	7
WC	(Argentina) G Durán (Argentina) M González	7	6
(Slovenia) A Bedene (Uruguay) A Behar	5	3
PR	(Austria) A Haider-Maurer (Serbia) D Lajović	3	6	[10]
2	(Mexico) S González (Chile) J Peralta	6	3	[5]

Quarterfinals
1	(Colombia) JS Cabal (Colombia) R Farah	w/o
(Spain) P Carreño Busta (Uruguay) P Cuevas
(Spain) D Marrero (Spain) F Verdasco	1	4
(Argentina) D Schwartzman (Austria) D Thiem	6	6
(Chile) H Podlipnik-Castillo (Belarus) A Vasilevski	1	5
4	(Argentina) A Molteni (Argentina) H Zeballos	6	7
WC	(Argentina) G Durán (Argentina) M González	6^{6}	6	[12]
PR	(Austria) A Haider-Maurer (Serbia) D Lajović	7^{8}	4	[10]

Semifinals
1	(Colombia) JS Cabal (Colombia) R Farah	7^{10}	6
(Argentina) D Schwartzman (Austria) D Thiem	6^{8}	2
4	(Argentina) A Molteni (Argentina) H Zeballos	7^{7}	7^{7}
WC	(Argentina) G Durán (Argentina) M González	6^{5}	6^{2}

Final
1	(Colombia) JS Cabal (Colombia) R Farah	3	7	[3]
4	(Argentina) A Molteni (Argentina) H Zeballos	6	5	[10]
