= 2017 Brisbane International – Women's singles =

Coordinates: 27°31′30″S 153°0′26″E

Women's singles
- 2017 Brisbane International

Final
- Champion: (Czech Republic) Karolína Plíšková
- Runner-up: (France) Alizé Cornet
- Score: 6–0, 6–3

Details
- Draw: 30 (4 Q / 2 WC )
- Seeds: 8

Events
Singles	men	women
Doubles	men	women
- Brisbane International

Victoria Azarenka was the defending champion, but could not compete after announcing her pregnancy in July 2016.

Karolína Plíšková won the title, defeating Alizé Cornet in the final, 6–0, 6–3.

== Seeds ==
The top two seeds received a bye into the second round.

1. (Germany) Angelique Kerber (quarterfinals)
2. (Slovakia) Dominika Cibulková (quarterfinals)
3. (Czech Republic) Karolína Plíšková (champion)
4. (Spain) Garbiñe Muguruza (semifinals, retired)
5. (Russia) Svetlana Kuznetsova (quarterfinals)
6. (Ukraine) Elina Svitolina (semifinals)
7. (Russia) Elena Vesnina (first round)
8. (Italy) Roberta Vinci (quarterfinals)

== Draw ==
=== Finals ===
Semifinals
6	(Ukraine) Elina Svitolina	2	4
3	(Czech Republic) Karolína Plíšková	6	6
4	(Spain) Garbiñe Muguruza	1^{r}
(France) Alizé Cornet	4

Final
3	(Czech Republic) Karolína Plíšková	6	6
(France) Alizé Cornet	0	3

=== Top half ===
First round
Q	(Serbia) A Krunić	2	2
WC	(Australia) A Barty	6	6
(United States) S Rogers	6	2	6
(Canada) E Bouchard	2	6	1
(Puerto Rico) M Puig	3	3
6	(Ukraine) E Svitolina	6	6
3	(Czech Republic) Ka Plíšková	6	6
(Kazakhstan) Y Putintseva	3	1
Q	(United States) A Muhammad	7^{7}	6
WC	(Croatia) D Vekić	6^{5}	1
(Russia) E Makarova	6^{1}	4
(Japan) M Doi	7^{7}	6
LL	(Ukraine) K Bondarenko	6^{4}	7^{7}	6^{5}
8	(Italy) R Vinci	7^{7}	6^{4}	7^{7}

Second round
1	(Germany) A Kerber	6	2	6
WC	(Australia) A Barty	3	6	3
(United States) S Rogers	5	6	5
6	(Ukraine) E Svitolina	7	2	7
3	(Czech Republic) Ka Plíšková	6	6
Q	(United States) A Muhammad	1	4
(Japan) M Doi	4	2
8	(Italy) R Vinci	6	6

Quarterfinals
1	(Germany) A Kerber	4	6	3
6	(Ukraine) E Svitolina	6	3	6
3	(Czech Republic) Ka Plíšková	3	6	6
8	(Italy) R Vinci	6	2	2

Semifinals
6	(Ukraine) E Svitolina	2	4
3	(Czech Republic) Ka Plíšková	6	6

=== Bottom half ===
First round
5	(Russia) S Kuznetsova	6	6
(United States) L Chirico	2	4
Q	(Australia) D Aiava	2	6	6
Q	(United States) B Mattek-Sands	6	3	4
(Romania) I-C Begu	3	3
(Russia) D Kasatkina	6	6
(Australia) S Stosur	5	7^{7}	5
4	(Spain) G Muguruza	7	6^{2}	7
7	(Russia) E Vesnina	6	4	6^{5}
(France) A Cornet	3	6	7^{7}
(United States) C McHale	6	6
(Italy) S Errani	3	3
(Germany) L Siegemund	6	6^{3}	3
(China) S Zhang	4	7^{7}	6

Second round
5	(Russia) S Kuznetsova	6	6
Q	(Australia) D Aiava	4	3
(Russia) D Kasatkina	5	6	6^{7}
4	(Spain) G Muguruza	7	3	7^{9}
(France) A Cornet	6	6
(United States) C McHale	2	1
(China) S Zhang	6	4	4
2	(Slovakia) D Cibulková	2	6	6

Quarterfinals
5	(Russia) S Kuznetsova	5	4
4	(Spain) G Muguruza	7	6
(France) A Cornet	6	7
2	(Slovakia) D Cibulková	3	5

Semifinals
4	(Spain) G Muguruza	1^{r}
(France) A Cornet	4

== Qualifying ==
=== Seeds ===
1. (Ukraine) Kateryna Bondarenko (qualifying competition, lucky loser)
2. (France) Océane Dodin (first round)
3. (Chinese Taipei) Hsieh Su-wei (first round)
4. (Germany) Carina Witthöft (qualifying competition)
5. (United States) Irina Falconi (first round)
6. (Ukraine) Kateryna Kozlova (qualifying competition)
7. (Italy) Francesca Schiavone (qualifying competition)
8. (United States) Samantha Crawford (first round)

=== Qualifiers ===
1. (United States) Asia Muhammad
2. (Serbia) Aleksandra Krunić
3. (United States) Bethanie Mattek-Sands
4. (Australia) Destanee Aiava

=== Lucky losers ===
1. (Ukraine) Kateryna Bondarenko

=== Qualifying draw ===
==== First qualifier ====
First round
1	(Ukraine) Kateryna Bondarenko	7	4	7^{8}
(Slovakia) Rebecca Šramková	5	6	6^{6}
(Bulgaria) Viktoriya Tomova	1	6	4
(Bulgaria) Elitsa Kostova	6	3	6
WC	(Australia) Jaimee Fourlis	4	4
(United States) Asia Muhammad	6	6
(Belarus) Aliaksandra Sasnovich	7	6
5	(United States) Irina Falconi	5	4

Second round
1	(Ukraine) Kateryna Bondarenko	6	7
(Bulgaria) Elitsa Kostova	1	5
(United States) Asia Muhammad	6	7^{7}
(Belarus) Aliaksandra Sasnovich	3	6^{5}

Qualifying competition
1	(Ukraine) Kateryna Bondarenko	4	6	1
(United States) Asia Muhammad	6	0	6

==== Second qualifier ====
First round
2	(France) Océane Dodin	5	5
(Serbia) Aleksandra Krunić	7	7
(Australia) Lizette Cabrera	4	6	6
(United States) Julia Boserup	6	1	0
(United States) Jennifer Brady	6	6
(Belgium) Elise Mertens	2	3
PR	(Japan) Ayumi Morita	6^{5}	0^{r}
7	(Italy) Francesca Schiavone	7^{7}	2

Second round
(Serbia) Aleksandra Krunić	6	7
(Australia) Lizette Cabrera	4	5
(United States) Jennifer Brady	4	7^{8}	3
7	(Italy) Francesca Schiavone	6	6^{6}	6

Qualifying competition
(Serbia) Aleksandra Krunić	6	6
7	(Italy) Francesca Schiavone	1	2

==== Third qualifier ====
First round
3	(Chinese Taipei) Hsieh Su-wei	3	7	5
(Austria) Barbara Haas	6	5	7
(United States) Bethanie Mattek-Sands	6	6
(South Korea) Jang Su-jeong	1	3
PR	(Russia) Ksenia Pervak	6	3	2
(United States) Sachia Vickery	2	6	6
WC	(Australia) Sara Tomic	4	4
6	(Ukraine) Kateryna Kozlova	6	6

Second round
(Austria) Barbara Haas	3	2
(United States) Bethanie Mattek-Sands	6	6
(United States) Sachia Vickery	3	1
6	(Ukraine) Kateryna Kozlova	6	6

Qualifying competition
(United States) Bethanie Mattek-Sands	6	4	6
6	(Ukraine) Kateryna Kozlova	3	6	2

==== Fourth qualifier ====
First round
4	(Germany) Carina Witthöft	3	6	6
PR	(Croatia) Jana Fett	6	3	3
WC	(Australia) Naiktha Bains	6^{4}	3
(Australia) Anastasia Rodionova	7^{7}	6
(Slovakia) Zuzana Zlochová	3	7	5
(Spain) María José Martínez Sánchez	6	5	7
WC	(Australia) Destanee Aiava	6	6
8	(United States) Samantha Crawford	0	4

Second round
4	(Germany) Carina Witthöft	4	6	4
(Australia) Anastasia Rodionova	6	1	0^{r}
(Spain) María José Martínez Sánchez	2	0
WC	(Australia) Destanee Aiava	6	6

Qualifying competition
4	(Germany) Carina Witthöft	1	1
WC	(Australia) Destanee Aiava	6	6
