= 2018 Argentina Open =

- Date: 12–18 February
- Edition: 21st
- Category: ATP World Tour 250 series
- Draw: 28S/16D
- Prize money: $546,680
- Surface: clay
- Location: Buenos Aires, Argentina

Champions

Singles
- (Austria) Dominic Thiem

Doubles
- (Argentina) Andrés Molteni / (Argentina) Horacio Zeballos
- ATP Buenos Aires

The 2018 Argentina Open was a men's tennis tournament played on outdoor clay courts. It was the 21st edition of the ATP Buenos Aires event, and part of the ATP World Tour 250 series of the 2018 ATP World Tour. It took place in Buenos Aires, Argentina, from February 12 through 18, 2018.

== Points and prize money ==
=== Point distribution ===
Event	W	F	SF	QF	Round of 16	Round of 32	Q	Q2	Q1
Singles	250	150	90	45	20	0	12	6	0
Doubles	250	150	90	45	0	—N/a	—N/a	—N/a	—N/a

=== Prize money ===
Event	W	F	SF	QF	Round of 16	Round of 32	Q2	Q1
Singles	$97,470	$51,355	$27,810	$15,840	$9,335	$5,530	$2,490	$1,240
Doubles	$29,610	$15,570	$8,430	$4,830	$2,830	—N/a	—N/a	—N/a
Doubles prize money per team

== Singles main-draw entrants ==
=== Seeds ===
Country	Player	Rank^{1}	Seed
AUT	Dominic Thiem	6	1
ESP	Pablo Carreño Busta	10	2
ESP	Albert Ramos Viñolas	21	3
ITA	Fabio Fognini	22	4
ARG	Diego Schwartzman	24	5
GBR	Kyle Edmund	26	6
URU	Pablo Cuevas	32	7
ESP	Fernando Verdasco	40	8

- ^{1} Rankings are as of February 5, 2018.

=== Other entrants ===
The following players received wildcards into the singles main draw:

- (Argentina) Carlos Berlocq
- (Argentina) Pedro Cachin
- (Argentina) Nicolás Kicker

The following players received entry as special exempts:

- (Spain) Roberto Carballés Baena
- (Brazil) Thiago Monteiro

The following players received entry using a protected ranking:

- (Austria) Andreas Haider-Maurer

The following players received entry from the qualifying draw:

- (Argentina) Facundo Bagnis
- (Brazil) Thomaz Bellucci
- (Italy) Marco Cecchinato
- (Brazil) Rogério Dutra Silva

=== Withdrawals ===
Before the tournament

- (Croatia) Marin Čilić → replaced by (Spain) Guillermo García López
- (Ukraine) Alexandr Dolgopolov → replaced by (Germany) Florian Mayer
- (United Kingdom) Kyle Edmund → replaced by (Portugal) Gastão Elias
- (Italy) Paolo Lorenzi → replaced by (Serbia) Dušan Lajović

== Doubles main-draw entrants ==
=== Seeds ===
Country	Player	Country	Player	Rank^{1}	Seed
COL	Juan Sebastián Cabal	COL	Robert Farah	35	1
MEX	Santiago González	CHI	Julio Peralta	57	2
CRO	Nikola Mektić	AUT	Alexander Peya	80	3
ARG	Andrés Molteni	ARG	Horacio Zeballos	84	4

- ^{1} Rankings are as of February 5, 2018.

=== Other entrants ===
The following pairs received wildcards into the doubles main draw:

- (France) Dorian Descloix / (France) Gaël Monfils
- (Argentina) Guillermo Durán / (Argentina) Máximo González

=== Withdrawals ===
During the tournament

- (Spain) Pablo Carreño Busta

== Finals ==
=== Singles ===
- (Austria) Dominic Thiem defeated (Slovenia) Aljaž Bedene, 6–2, 6–4

=== Doubles ===
- (Argentina) Andrés Molteni / (Argentina) Horacio Zeballos defeated (Colombia) Juan Sebastián Cabal / (Colombia) Robert Farah, 6–3, 5–7, [10–3]
