= 2017 Brisbane International – Men's singles =

Men's singles
- 2017 Brisbane International

Final
- Champion: (Bulgaria) Grigor Dimitrov
- Runner-up: (Japan) Kei Nishikori
- Score: 6–2, 2–6, 6–3

Details
- Draw: 28 (4 Q / 3 WC )
- Seeds: 8

Events
Singles	men	women
Doubles	men	women
- Brisbane International

Grigor Dimitrov defeated Kei Nishikori in the final, 6–2, 2–6, 6–3 to win the men's singles tennis title at the 2017 Brisbane International. He became the first man to earn three Top-10 wins en route to an ATP 250 title, since the series began in 2009.

Milos Raonic was the defending champion, but lost in the semifinals to Dimitrov.

== Seeds ==
The top four seeds receive a bye into the second round.

1. (Canada) Milos Raonic (semifinals)
2. (Switzerland) Stan Wawrinka (semifinals)
3. (Japan) Kei Nishikori (final)
4. (Austria) Dominic Thiem (quarterfinals)
5. (Spain) Rafael Nadal (quarterfinals)
6. (France) Lucas Pouille (second round, retired)
7. (Bulgaria) Grigor Dimitrov (champion)
8. (Spain) David Ferrer (second round)

== Draw ==
=== Finals ===
Semifinals
1	(Canada) Milos Raonic	6^{7}	2
7	(Bulgaria) Grigor Dimitrov	7^{9}	6
3	(Japan) Kei Nishikori	7^{7}	6
2	(Switzerland) Stan Wawrinka	6^{3}	3

Final
7	(Bulgaria) Grigor Dimitrov	6	2	6
3	(Japan) Kei Nishikori	2	6	3

=== Top half ===
First round
(United States) S Querrey	2	4
(Argentina) D Schwartzman	6	6
Q	(Australia) A de Minaur	3	3
(Germany) M Zverev	6	6
(Ukraine) A Dolgopolov	3	3
5	(Spain) R Nadal	6	6
WC	(Australia) S Groth	6	5	7
(France) P-H Herbert	3	7	5
(France) N Mahut	4	6	6
(France) S Robert	6	3	4
(United States) S Johnson	2	3
7	(Bulgaria) G Dimitrov	6	6

Second round
1	(Canada) M Raonic	6	6
(Argentina) D Schwartzman	3	2
(Germany) M Zverev	1	1
5	(Spain) R Nadal	6	6
4	(Austria) D Thiem	7^{7}	6
WC	(Australia) S Groth	6^{5}	3
(France) N Mahut	2	4
7	(Bulgaria) G Dimitrov	6	6

Quarterfinals
1	(Canada) M Raonic	4	6	6
5	(Spain) R Nadal	6	3	4
4	(Austria) D Thiem	3	6	3
7	(Bulgaria) G Dimitrov	6	4	6

Semifinals
1	(Canada) M Raonic	6^{7}	2
7	(Bulgaria) G Dimitrov	7^{9}	6

=== Bottom half ===
First round
8	(Spain) D Ferrer	6	7
(Australia) B Tomic	3	5
WC	(Sweden) E Ymer	3	2
WC	(Australia) J Thompson	6	6
Q	(United States) J Donaldson	6	6
(Luxembourg) G Müller	4	4
6	(France) L Pouille	7^{8}	7^{7}
(France) G Simon	6^{6}	6^{4}
(United Kingdom) K Edmund	7^{7}	7^{8}
Q	(United States) E Escobedo	6^{4}	6^{6}
(Serbia) V Troicki	6	7
Q	(Japan) Y Nishioka	4	5

Second round
8	(Spain) D Ferrer	6	5	5
WC	(Australia) J Thompson	4	7	7
Q	(United States) J Donaldson	6	4	3
3	(Japan) K Nishikori	4	6	6
6	(France) L Pouille	3	1^{r}
(United Kingdom) K Edmund	6	3
(Serbia) V Troicki	6^{5}	4
2	(Switzerland) S Wawrinka	7^{7}	6

Quarterfinals
WC	(Australia) J Thompson	1	1
3	(Japan) K Nishikori	6	6
(United Kingdom) K Edmund	7^{7}	4	4
2	(Switzerland) S Wawrinka	6^{2}	6	6

Semifinals
3	(Japan) K Nishikori	7^{7}	6
2	(Switzerland) S Wawrinka	6^{3}	3

== Qualifying ==
=== Seeds ===
1. (Kazakhstan) Mikhail Kukushkin (first round)
2. (United States) Ryan Harrison (first round)
3. (Japan) Yoshihito Nishioka (qualified)
4. (United States) Jared Donaldson (qualified)
5. (United States) Frances Tiafoe (qualifying competition)
6. (United States) Bjorn Fratangelo (first round)
7. (United States) Stefan Kozlov (first round)
8. (Germany) Tobias Kamke (first round)

=== Qualifiers ===
1. (Australia) Alex de Minaur
2. (United States) Ernesto Escobedo
3. (Japan) Yoshihito Nishioka
4. (United States) Jared Donaldson

=== Qualifying draw ===
==== First qualifier ====
First round
1	(Kazakhstan) Mikhail Kukushkin	4	6^{7}
WC	(Australia) Alex de Minaur	6	7^{9}
(Australia) Andrew Whittington	6^{5}	3
5	(United States) Frances Tiafoe	7^{7}	6

Qualifying competition
WC	(Australia) Alex de Minaur	6^{4}	6	6
5	(United States) Frances Tiafoe	7^{7}	4	4

==== Second qualifier ====
First round
2	(United States) Ryan Harrison	4	6	4
(Croatia) Ivan Dodig	6	4	6
(United States) Ernesto Escobedo	6	6
8	(Germany) Tobias Kamke	3	4

Qualifying competition
(Croatia) Ivan Dodig	3	7^{7}	3
(United States) Ernesto Escobedo	6	6^{3}	6

==== Third qualifier ====
First round
3	(Japan) Yoshihito Nishioka	6	0	6
(Japan) Go Soeda	4	6	2
(United States) Tim Smyczek	4	6	6
6	(United States) Bjorn Fratangelo	6	2	3

Qualifying competition
3	(Japan) Yoshihito Nishioka	7	6
(United States) Tim Smyczek	5	4

==== Fourth qualifier ====
First round
4	(United States) Jared Donaldson	6	6
(United States) Rajeev Ram	2	4
WC	(Australia) John-Patrick Smith	6	6
7	(United States) Stefan Kozlov	2	3

Qualifying competition
4	(United States) Jared Donaldson	6	4	7^{7}
WC	(Australia) John-Patrick Smith	2	6	6^{2}
