= 2018 Erste Bank Open – Singles =

Singles
- 2018 Erste Bank Open

Final
- Champion: (South Africa) Kevin Anderson
- Runner-up: (Japan) Kei Nishikori
- Score: 6–3, 7–6^{(7–3)}

Details
- Draw: 32 (4 Q / 3 WC )
- Seeds: 8

Events
| Singles | Doubles |
| ← 2017 · | Vienna Open | · 2019 → |

Lucas Pouille was the defending champion but lost to Borna Ćorić in the second round.

Kevin Anderson won the title, defeating Kei Nishikori in the final, 6–3, 7–6^{(7–3)}. Anderson saved a match point in his opening round match against Nikoloz Basilashvili.

This was Nishikori's ninth consecutive defeat in ATP World Tour level finals. His most recent victory came in February 2016 at Memphis.

== Seeds ==
1. (Austria) Dominic Thiem (quarterfinals)
2. (South Africa) Kevin Anderson (champion)
3. (Bulgaria) Grigor Dimitrov (first round)
4. (United States) John Isner (second round)
5. (Japan) Kei Nishikori (final)
6. (Croatia) Borna Ćorić (quarterfinals, retired)
7. (Italy) Fabio Fognini (second round)
8. (United Kingdom) Kyle Edmund (second round)

== Draw ==
=== Key ===
- Q = Qualifier
- WC = Wild card
- LL = Lucky loser
- Alt = Alternate
- SE = Special exempt
- PR = Protected ranking
- ITF = ITF entry
- JE = Junior exempt
- w/o = Walkover
- r = Retired
- d = Defaulted
- SR = Special ranking

=== Finals ===
Semifinals
5 | (Japan) Kei Nishikori | 6 | 6
Q | (Kazakhstan) Mikhail Kukushkin | 4 | 3
(Spain) Fernando Verdasco | 3 | 6 | 4
2 | (South Africa) Kevin Anderson | 6 | 3 | 6

Final
5 | (Japan) Kei Nishikori | 3 | 6^{3}
2 | (South Africa) Kevin Anderson | 6 | 7^{7}

=== Top half ===
First round
1 | (Austria) D Thiem | 7 | 7^{7}
Q | (Belgium) R Bemelmans | 5 | 6^{5}
(France) J-W Tsonga | 3 | 6 | 3
(United States) S Querrey | 6 | 3 | 6
(Russia) K Khachanov | 6 | 7
WC | (Austria) D Novak | 3 | 5
(United States) F Tiafoe | 6^{3} | 7 | 2
5 | (Japan) K Nishikori | 7^{7} | 5 | 6
3 | (Bulgaria) G Dimitrov | 4 | 6 | 4
Q | (Kazakhstan) M Kukushkin | 6 | 4 | 6
Q | (United States) D Kudla | 6^{3} | 0
LL | (Russia) A Rublev | 7^{7} | 6
(Hungary) M Fucsovics | 1 | 6 | 7
WC | (Canada) F Auger-Aliassime | 6 | 0 | 5
(Bosnia and Herzegovina) D Džumhur | 4 | 3
7 | (Italy) F Fognini | 6 | 6

Second round
1 | (Austria) D Thiem | 6 | 6
(United States) S Querrey | 4 | 4
(Russia) K Khachanov | 2 | 2
5 | (Japan) K Nishikori | 6 | 6
Q | (Kazakhstan) M Kukushkin | 7^{7} | 6
LL | (Russia) A Rublev | 6^{4} | 4
(Hungary) M Fucsovics | 4 | 6 | 6
7 | (Italy) F Fognini | 6 | 3 | 2

Quarterfinals
1 | (Austria) D Thiem | 3 | 1
5 | (Japan) K Nishikori | 6 | 6
Q | (Kazakhstan) M Kukushkin | 4 | 7^{7} | 7^{7}
(Hungary) M Fucsovics | 6 | 6^{2} | 6^{4}

Semifinals
5 | (Japan) K Nishikori | 6 | 6
Q | (Kazakhstan) M Kukushkin | 4 | 3

=== Bottom half ===
First round
8 | (United Kingdom) K Edmund | 6 | 7^{7}
(Argentina) D Schwartzman | 3 | 6^{3}
(Spain) F Verdasco | 6^{6} | 6 | 6
Q | (France) P-H Herbert | 7^{8} | 3 | 4
SE | (France) G Monfils | 4 | 6 | 6
(United States) S Johnson | 6 | 3 | 2
LL | (United Kingdom) C Norrie | 7^{7} | 4 | 6^{7}
4 | (United States) J Isner | 6^{1} | 6 | 7^{9}
6 | (Croatia) B Ćorić | 6^{5} | 6 | 6
(Spain) A Ramos Viñolas | 7^{7} | 0 | 4
(Germany) P Kohlschreiber | 4 | 7^{7} | 4
(France) L Pouille | 6 | 6^{5} | 6
(Canada) M Raonic | 6^{6} | 5
WC | (Austria) J Melzer | 7^{8} | 7
(Georgia (country)) N Basilashvili | 6 | 6^{6} | 3
2 | (South Africa) K Anderson | 4 | 7^{8} | 6

Second round
8 | (United Kingdom) K Edmund | 4 | 6 | 3
(Spain) F Verdasco | 6 | 3 | 6
SE | (France) G Monfils | 6 | 6
4 | (United States) J Isner | 4 | 4
6 | (Croatia) B Ćorić | 4 | 6 | 6
(France) L Pouille | 6 | 0 | 4
WC | (Austria) J Melzer
2 | (South Africa) K Anderson | w/o

Quarterfinals
(Spain) F Verdasco | 6 | 2
SE | (France) G Monfils | 4 | 1^{r}
6 | (Croatia) B Ćorić | 6^{2} | 2^{r}
2 | (South Africa) K Anderson | 7^{7} | 1

Semifinals
(Spain) F Verdasco | 3 | 6 | 4
2 | (South Africa) K Anderson | 6 | 3 | 6

== Qualifying ==
=== Seeds ===
1. (France) Pierre-Hugues Herbert (qualified)
2. (United States) Denis Kudla (qualified)
3. (Argentina) Guido Pella (qualifying competition)
4. (Kazakhstan) Mikhail Kukushkin (qualified)
5. (Russia) Andrey Rublev (qualifying competition, lucky loser)
6. (United Kingdom) Cameron Norrie (qualifying competition, lucky loser)
7. (United States) Bradley Klahn (first round)
8. (Belgium) Ruben Bemelmans (qualified)

=== Qualifiers ===
1. (France) Pierre-Hugues Herbert
2. (United States) Denis Kudla
3. (Belgium) Ruben Bemelmans
4. (Kazakhstan) Mikhail Kukushkin

=== Lucky losers ===
1. (Russia) Andrey Rublev
2. (United Kingdom) Cameron Norrie

=== Qualifying draw ===
==== First qualifier ====
First round
1 | (France) Pierre-Hugues Herbert | 6 | 6
WC | (Austria) Jurij Rodionov | 1 | 2
(Canada) Peter Polansky | 2 | 1
6 | (United Kingdom) Cameron Norrie | 6 | 6

Qualifying competition
1 | (France) Pierre-Hugues Herbert | 4 | 7^{7} | 7
6 | (United Kingdom) Cameron Norrie | 6 | 6^{4} | 5

==== Second qualifier ====
First round
2 | (United States) Denis Kudla | 7^{7} | 4 | 6
(Germany) Matthias Bachinger | 6^{3} | 6 | 3
Alt | (Ukraine) Sergiy Stakhovsky | 6^{5} | 6 | 6
7 | (United States) Bradley Klahn | 7^{7} | 4 | 4

Qualifying competition
2 | (United States) Denis Kudla | 6 | 2 | 6
Alt | (Ukraine) Sergiy Stakhovsky | 1 | 6 | 2

==== Third qualifier ====
First round
3 | (Argentina) Guido Pella | 6^{1} | 6 | 3
(Estonia) Jürgen Zopp | 7^{7} | 2 | 4^{r}
WC | (Austria) Sebastian Ofner | 6 | 3 | 4
8 | (Belgium) Ruben Bemelmans | 3 | 6 | 6

Qualifying competition
3 | (Argentina) Guido Pella | 4 | 0
8 | (Belgium) Ruben Bemelmans | 6 | 6

==== Fourth qualifier ====
First round
4 | (Kazakhstan) Mikhail Kukushkin | 7 | 6
Alt | (Czech Republic) Václav Šafránek | 5 | 2
Alt | (Austria) Lucas Miedler | 1 | 2
5 | (Russia) Andrey Rublev | 6 | 6

Qualifying competition
4 | (Kazakhstan) Mikhail Kukushkin | 6 | 6
5 | (Russia) Andrey Rublev | 2 | 3
