= 2010 Sarasota Open – Singles =

Singles
- 2010 Sarasota Open

Final
- Champion: (Japan) Kei Nishikori
- Runner-up: (Argentina) Brian Dabul
- Score: 2–6, 6–3, 6–4

Events
Singles	Doubles
- Sarasota Open

James Ward was the defending champion, but he lost against Víctor Estrella in the first round.
Kei Nishikori, who played in this tournament as a 'special exempt', won in the final 2–6, 6–3, 6–4, against Brian Dabul.

== Seeds ==
1. (United States) Taylor Dent (first round, retired)
2. (United States) Jesse Levine (quarterfinals)
3. (Australia) ~~Carsten Ball~~ (withdrew due to Davis Cup)
4. (Argentina) Brian Dabul (final)
5. (United States) Kevin Kim (second round)
6. (United States) Ryan Sweeting (semifinals)
7. (United States) Donald Young (first round)
8. (United States) Alex Kuznetsov (second round)
9. (United States) Robert Kendrick (first round)

== Draw ==
Key

- Q = Qualifier
- WC = Wild card
- LL = Lucky loser
- Alt = Alternate
- ITF = ITF entry
- PR = Protected ranking
- SR = Special ranking
- SE = Special exempt
- JE = Junior exempt
- JR = Junior Accelerator Programme entrant
- CO = College Accelerator Programme entrant
- NG = Next Gen Accelerator Program entrant
- w/o = Walkover
- r = Retired
- d = Defaulted

=== Finals ===
Semifinals
SE	(Japan) Kei Nishikori	6	6
6	(United States) Ryan Sweeting	4	2
4	(Argentina) Brian Dabul	6	6
Q	(Mexico) Daniel Garza	1	2

Final
SE	(Japan) Kei Nishikori	2	6	6
4	(Argentina) Brian Dabul	6	3	4

=== Top half ===
First round
1	(United States) T Dent	6	2	r
(United States) T Smyczek	2	4
WC	(United States) Vamsee Chappidi	1	1
SE	(Japan) K Nishikori	6	6
(United States) J Witten	3	3
LL	(Mexico) B Rodríguez	6	6
(Canada) V Pospisil	6^{3}	3
5	(United States) K Kim	7	6
9	(United States) R Kendrick	1	5
WC	(United States) S Bangoura	6	7
(United States) R DeHeart	7	0	0^{r}
WC	(United States) B Reynolds	6^{5}	6	3
(United Kingdom) J Baker	6^{1}	6	6
WC	(United States) M Venus	7	1	4
(New Zealand) J Statham	2	3
6	(United States) R Sweeting	6	6

Second round
(United States) T Smyczek	4	3
SE	(Japan) K Nishikori	6	6
LL	(Mexico) B Rodríguez	6	6
5	(United States) K Kim	2	3
WC	(United States) S Bangoura	2	4
WC	(United States) B Reynolds	6	6
(United Kingdom) J Baker	2	4
6	(United States) R Sweeting	6	6

Quarterfinals
SE	(Japan) K Nishikori	6	6
LL	(Mexico) B Rodríguez	1	2
WC	(United States) B Reynolds	6^{3}	6	3
6	(United States) R Sweeting	7	3	6

Semifinals
SE	(Japan) K Nishikori	6	6
6	(United States) R Sweeting	4	2

=== Bottom half ===
First round
8	(United States) A Kuznetsov	6	6
(Australia) G Jones	4	3
Q	(Australia) M Reid	7	6
LL	(United States) N Monroe	6^{3}	1
(United Kingdom) J Ward	7	1	4
(Dominican Republic) V Estrella	6^{1}	6	6
(United States) L Cook	2	1
4	(Argentina) B Dabul	6	6
7	(United States) D Young	4	4
SE	(Australia) J Sirianni	6	6
Q	(Mexico) D Garza	6	4	6
PR	(Germany) A Satschko	4	6	1
Q	(Australia) Dayne Kelly	2	6	6
Q	(Sweden) M Ryderstedt	6	3	4
(Romania) C Gârd	3	2
2	(United States) J Levine	6	6

Second round
8	(United States) A Kuznetsov	6	3	3
Q	(Australia) M Reid	4	6	6
(Dominican Republic) V Estrella	4	2
4	(Argentina) B Dabul	6	6
SE	(Australia) J Sirianni	3	6^{5}
Q	(Mexico) D Garza	6	7
Q	(Australia) D Kelly	1	1
2	(United States) J Levine	6	6

Quarterfinals
Q	(Australia) M Reid	2	2
4	(Argentina) B Dabul	6	6
Q	(Mexico) D Garza	6	4	7
2	(United States) J Levine	4	6	5

Semifinals
4	(Argentina) B Dabul	6	6
Q	(Mexico) D Garza	1	2
