= 2017 Argentina Open – Singles =

Singles
- 2017 Argentina Open

Final
- Champion: (Ukraine) Alexandr Dolgopolov
- Runner-up: (Japan) Kei Nishikori
- Score: 7–6^{(7–4)}, 6–4

Details
- Draw: 28 (4 Q / 3 WC )
- Seeds: 8

Events
Singles	Doubles
- Argentina Open

Alexandr Dolgopolov defeated Kei Nishikori in the final, 7–6^{(7–4)}, 6–4 to win the singles tennis title at the 2017 Argentina Open.

Dominic Thiem was the reigning champion, but chose to compete in Rotterdam instead.

== Seeds ==
The top four seeds receive a bye into the second round.

1. (Japan) Kei Nishikori (final)
2. (Uruguay) Pablo Cuevas (second round)
3. (Spain) David Ferrer (second round)
4. (Spain) Pablo Carreño Busta (semifinals)
5. (Spain) Albert Ramos Viñolas (quarterfinals)
6. (Portugal) João Sousa (quarterfinals)
7. (Italy) Fabio Fognini (first round)
8. (Italy) Paolo Lorenzi (first round)

== Draw ==
Key

- Q = Qualifier
- WC = Wild card
- LL = Lucky loser
- Alt = Alternate
- ITF = ITF entry
- PR = Protected ranking
- SR = Special ranking
- SE = Special exempt
- JE = Junior exempt
- JR = Junior Accelerator Programme entrant
- CO = College Accelerator Programme entrant
- NG = Next Gen Accelerator Program entrant
- w/o = Walkover
- r = Retired
- d = Defaulted

=== Finals ===
Semifinals
1	(Japan) Kei Nishikori	4	6	6
WC	(Argentina) Carlos Berlocq	6	4	3
4	(Spain) Pablo Carreño Busta	5	2
(Ukraine) Alexandr Dolgopolov	7	6

Final
1	(Japan) Kei Nishikori	6^{4}	4
(Ukraine) Alexandr Dolgopolov	7^{7}	6

=== Top half ===
First round
(Argentina) D Schwartzman	6	6
(Argentina) F Bagnis	1	4
(France) S Robert	3	1
(Argentina) F Delbonis	6	6
(Argentina) H Zeballos	2	6^{4}
6	(Portugal) J Sousa	6	7^{7}
WC	(Argentina) C Berlocq	6	6
Q	(Slovakia) J Kovalík	4	4
SE	(Dominican Republic) V Estrella Burgos	2	1
(Brazil) T Monteiro	6	6
PR	(Spain) T Robredo	6	6
7	(Italy) F Fognini	4	3

Second round
1	(Japan) K Nishikori	5	6	6
(Argentina) D Schwartzman	7	2	2
(Argentina) F Delbonis	5	3
6	(Portugal) J Sousa	7	6
3	(Spain) D Ferrer	4	2
WC	(Argentina) C Berlocq	6	6
(Brazil) T Monteiro	6	6
PR	(Spain) T Robredo	3	4

Quarterfinals
1	(Japan) K Nishikori	6	6
6	(Portugal) J Sousa	1	4
WC	(Argentina) C Berlocq	3	6	6
(Brazil) T Monteiro	6	2	3

Semifinals
1	(Japan) K Nishikori	4	6	6
WC	(Argentina) C Berlocq	6	4	3

=== Bottom half ===
First round
5	(Spain) A Ramos Viñolas	6^{8}	6	7^{8}
(Argentina) G Pella	7^{10}	4	6^{6}
WC	(Argentina) L Mayer	4	6	6
(Portugal) G Elias	6	4	4
Q	(Brazil) R Dutra Silva	7	6^{6}	4
Q	(Italy) A Giannessi	5	7^{8}	6
8	(Italy) P Lorenzi	3	3
(Austria) G Melzer	6	6
Q	(Argentina) G Andreozzi	2	6	6
(Argentina) R Olivo	6	4	4
(Ukraine) A Dolgopolov	6	6
WC	(Serbia) J Tipsarević	3	3

Second round
5	(Spain) A Ramos Viñolas	6^{4}	7^{7}	1
WC	(Argentina) L Mayer	7^{7}	6^{3}	0^{r}
Q	(Italy) A Giannessi	1	6	4
4	(Spain) P Carreño Busta	6	4	6
(Austria) G Melzer	7^{7}	6
Q	(Argentina) G Andreozzi	6^{4}	3
(Ukraine) A Dolgopolov	6	7^{7}
2	(Uruguay) P Cuevas	3	6^{4}

Quarterfinals
5	(Spain) A Ramos Viñolas	3	6	4
4	(Spain) P Carreño Busta	6	4	6
(Austria) G Melzer	5	4
(Ukraine) A Dolgopolov	7	6

Semifinals
4	(Spain) P Carreño Busta	5	2
(Ukraine) A Dolgopolov	7	6

== Qualifying ==
=== Seeds ===
1. (Brazil) Rogério Dutra Silva (qualified)
2. (Serbia) Dušan Lajović (qualifying competition)
3. (Slovakia) Jozef Kovalík (qualified)
4. (Argentina) Nicolás Kicker (first round)
5. (Argentina) Guido Andreozzi (qualified)
6. (Italy) Alessandro Giannessi (qualified)
7. (Brazil) João Souza (qualifying competition)
8. (Belgium) Arthur De Greef (first round)

=== Qualifiers ===
1. (Brazil) Rogério Dutra Silva
2. (Italy) Alessandro Giannessi
3. (Slovakia) Jozef Kovalík
4. (Argentina) Guido Andreozzi

=== Qualifying draw ===
==== First qualifier ====
First round
1	(Brazil) Rogério Dutra Silva	6	6
WC	(Argentina) Federico Coria	2	0
Alt	(Italy) Marco Cecchinato	6^{1}	3
7	(Brazil) João Souza	7^{7}	6

Qualifying competition
1	(Brazil) Rogério Dutra Silva	6	6
7	(Brazil) João Souza	2	2

==== Second qualifier ====
First round
2	(Serbia) Dušan Lajović	6	6
PR	(Italy) Simone Bolelli	1	4
(Spain) Roberto Carballés Baena	4	4
6	(Italy) Alessandro Giannessi	6	6

Qualifying competition
2	(Serbia) Dušan Lajović	3	6	1
6	(Italy) Alessandro Giannessi	6	3	6

==== Third qualifier ====
First round
3	(Slovakia) Jozef Kovalík	5
(Slovakia) Andrej Martin	2^{r}
(Spain) Rubén Ramírez Hidalgo	6	6
8	(Belgium) Arthur De Greef	4	2

Qualifying competition
3	(Slovakia) Jozef Kovalík	6	1	6
(Spain) Rubén Ramírez Hidalgo	3	6	4

==== Fourth qualifier ====
First round
4	(Argentina) Nicolás Kicker	3	6	3
(Argentina) Máximo González	6	1	6
WC	(Argentina) Manuel Peña López	4	2
5	(Argentina) Guido Andreozzi	6	6

Qualifying competition
(Argentina) Máximo González	0	4
5	(Argentina) Guido Andreozzi	6	6
