= 1995 XL Bermuda Open =

- Date: 17–22 April
- Edition: 2nd
- Category: World Series
- Draw: 32S / 16D
- Prize money: $303,000
- Surface: Clay / outdoor
- Location: Paget, Bermuda

Champions

Singles
- (Colombia) Mauricio Hadad

Doubles
- (Canada) Grant Connell / (United States) Todd Martin
- XL Bermuda Open

The 1995 XL Bermuda Open was a men's tennis tournament played on outdoor clay courts in Paget in Bermuda and was part of the World Series of the 1995 ATP Tour. It was the second edition of the tournament and was held from 17 April through 22 April 1995. Unseeded Mauricio Hadad won the singles title.

== Finals ==
=== Singles ===
(Colombia) Mauricio Hadad defeated (Argentina) Javier Frana 7–6^{(7–5)}, 3–6, 6–4

- It was Hadad's only singles title of his career.

=== Doubles ===
(Canada) Grant Connell / (United States) Todd Martin defeated (New Zealand) Brett Steven / (Australia) Jason Stoltenberg 7–6, 2–6, 7–5

- It was Connell's 4th doubles title of the year and the 15th of his career. It was Martin's 1st doubles title of the year and the 3rd of his career.
