= 2008 XL Bermuda Open – Doubles =

This is the draw for the 2008 XL Bermuda Open doubles competition. Marcelo Melo and André Sá were the defending champions, but did not participate.

== Seeds ==
1. (United States) Scott Lipsky / (United States) David Martin (first round)
2. (United States) Eric Butorac / (Australia) Ashley Fisher (first round)
3. (Uruguay) Pablo Cuevas / (Spain) Marcel Granollers Pujol (quarterfinals)
4. (Israel) Harel Levy / (United States) Jim Thomas (champions)

== Key ==
- WC = Wild card
- Alt = Alternate
- w/o = Walkover
- r = Retired

== Draw ==
First Round
1	(United States) S Lipsky (United States) D Martin	7	6^{7}	[9]
(Chile) P Capdeville (United States) R Ginepri	6^{6}	7	[11]
WC	(Australia) G Jones (United States) D Young	6	6
(India) S Amritraj (Israel) D Sela	1	2
4	(Israel) H Levy (United States) J Thomas	4	6	[10]
WC	(Argentina) L Arnold Ker (Argentina) M Hood	6	3	[7]
(Croatia) F Škugor (Serbia) V Troicki	7	0	[4]
(Austria) D Köllerer (Israel) N Okun	5	6	[10]
Alt	(Austria) A Haider-Maurer (United States) James Ludlow	2	3
(South Africa) C Haggard (Australia) P Luczak	6	6
(Japan) K Nishikori (Argentina) S Roitman	1	1
3	(Uruguay) P Cuevas (Spain) M Granollers Pujol	6	6
(United States) N Kryvonos (Czech Republic) J Vacek	6	6
WC	(Bermuda) Andy Bray (Bermuda) J Collieson	2	0
(Argentina) D Hartfield (Netherlands Antilles) J-J Rojer	7	6
2	(United States) E Butorac (Australia) A Fisher	6^{2}	4

Quarterfinals
(Chile) P Capdeville (United States) R Ginepri	3	3
WC	(Australia) G Jones (United States) D Young	6	6
4	(Israel) H Levy (United States) J Thomas	6	7
(Austria) D Köllerer (Israel) N Okun	3	5
(South Africa) C Haggard (Australia) P Luczak	w/o
3	(Uruguay) P Cuevas (Spain) M Granollers Pujol
(United States) N Kryvonos (Czech Republic) J Vacek	3	5
(Argentina) D Hartfield (Netherlands Antilles) J-J Rojer	6	7

Semifinals
WC	(Australia) G Jones (United States) D Young	7	3	[7]
4	(Israel) H Levy (United States) J Thomas	6^{6}	6	[10]
(South Africa) C Haggard (Australia) P Luczak	1	6	[10]
(Argentina) D Hartfield (Netherlands Antilles) J-J Rojer	6	4	[8]

Finals
4	(Israel) H Levy (United States) J Thomas	6^{4}	6	[11]
(South Africa) C Haggard (Australia) P Luczak	7	4	[9]
