= XL Bermuda Open =

Defunct tennis tournament
- Founded: 1993
- Abolished: 2008
- Editions: 15
- Location: Paget; Bermuda
- Venue: Coral Beach Club
- Category: ATP Challenger Series
- Surface: Clay
- Draw: 32S/32Q/16D
- Prize money: $100,000

The XL Bermuda Open was a tennis tournament played in 1993 and from 1995 until 2008 on clay courts. The event was held annually in Paget in Bermuda and was part of the ATP Challenger Tour. It was part of the ATP World Tour in 1995 and 1996.

Hernán Gumy and Flávio Saretta were the title holders in singles, with two win each.

Mark Knowles, Doug Flach and Richey Reneberg were the record holders on doubles titles with two victories each one. The last two as partners.

== Past finals ==
=== Key ===
ATP Tour
Challenger

=== Singles ===
Year	Champion	Runner-up	Score
1993	(Sweden) Mikael Pernfors	(Czech Republic) Sláva Doseděl	6–4, 6–3
1994	Not held		
1995	(Colombia) Mauricio Hadad	(Argentina) Javier Frana	7–6, 3–6, 6–4
1996	(United States) MaliVai Washington	(Uruguay) Marcelo Filippini	6–7, 6–4, 7–5
1997	(Belgium) Johan van Herck	(Armenia) Sargis Sargsian	6–1, 4–6, 6–0
1998	(Argentina) Hernán Gumy (1)	(Argentina) Lucas Arnold	7–6, 4–6, 6–2
1999	(Argentina) Hernán Gumy (2)	(Argentina) Guillermo Cañas	6–3, 7–6^{(7–3)}
2000	(Australia) Andrew Ilie	(Czech Republic) Michal Tabara	4–6, 6–3, 6–2
2001	(Argentina) José Acasuso	(Spain) David Sánchez	7–6^{(7–4)}, 6–1
2002	(Brazil) Flávio Saretta (1)	(United States) Vince Spadea	6–3, 7–5
2003	(Brazil) Flávio Saretta (2)	(Chile) Nicolás Massú	6–1, 6–4
2004	(Peru) Luis Horna	(Argentina) Martín Vassallo Argüello	6–4, 4–6, 6–4
2005	(Czech Republic) Tomáš Zíb	(Belgium) Kristof Vliegen	6–7^{(8–10)}, 7–6^{(8–6)}, 6–1
2006	(Spain) Fernando Vicente	(Luxembourg) Gilles Müller	2–6, 6–2, 7–6^{(7–3)}
2007	(Argentina) Mariano Zabaleta	(Canada) Frank Dancevic	7–5, 5–7, 6–3
2008	(Japan) Kei Nishikori	(Serbia) Viktor Troicki	2–6, 7–5, 7–6^{(7–5)}

=== Doubles ===
Year	Champion	Runner-up	Score
1993	(The Bahamas) Mark Knowles (1) (United States) Jared Palmer	(Venezuela) Nicolás Pereira (Venezuela) Maurice Ruah	6–1, 6–3
1994	Not held		
1995	(Canada) Grant Connell (United States) Todd Martin	(New Zealand) Brett Steven (Australia) Jason Stoltenberg	7–6, 2–6, 7–5
1996	(Sweden) Jan Apell (South Africa) Brent Haygarth	(Australia) Pat Cash (Australia) Patrick Rafter	3–6, 6–1, 6–3
1997	(Argentina) Javier Frana (The Bahamas) Mark Knowles (2)	(Argentina) Lucas Arnold (Argentina) Daniel Orsanic	6–3, 6–7, 6–3
1998	(United States) Doug Flach (1) (United States) Richey Reneberg (1)	(Russia) Andrei Cherkasov (France) Rodolphe Gilbert	3–6, 6–4, 6–2
1999	(United States) Doug Flach (2) (United States) Richey Reneberg (2)	(Australia) Paul Kilderry (Australia) Patrick Rafter	6–4, 6–4
2000	(India) Leander Paes (Netherlands) Jan Siemerink	(South Africa) Jeff Coetzee (South Africa) Brent Haygarth	6–3, 6–2
2001	(United States) Paul Goldstein (United States) Andy Roddick	(Japan) Thomas Shimada (South Africa) Grant Stafford	4–6, 6–3, 6–4
2002	(Switzerland) George Bastl (South Africa) Neville Godwin	(Paraguay) Ramón Delgado (Brazil) Alexandre Simoni	7–6^{(10–8)}, 6–3
2003	(United States) Robert Kendrick (The Bahamas) Mark Merklein	(Australia) Ashley Fisher (Australia) Andrew Kratzmann	6–3, 3–1 ret.
2004	(Australia) Jordan Kerr (1) (Belgium) Tom Vanhoudt	(Australia) Ashley Fisher (Australia) Stephen Huss	4–6, 6–3, 7–6^{(8–6)}
2005	(Australia) Jordan Kerr (2) (Argentina) Sebastián Prieto	(Czech Republic) Michal Tabara (Czech Republic) Tomáš Zíb	Walkover
2006	(Czech Republic) Tomáš Cibulec (Sweden) Robert Lindstedt	(United States) Alex Kuznetsov (United States) Jeff Morrison	6–7^{(1–7)}, 6–3, [10–4]
2007	(Brazil) Marcelo Melo (Brazil) André Sá	(Germany) Benedikt Dorsch (Ukraine) Sergiy Stakhovsky	6–2, 6–4
2008	(Israel) Harel Levy (United States) Jim Thomas	(South Africa) Chris Haggard (Australia) Peter Luczak	6–7^{(4–7)}, 6–4, [11–9]

== See also ==
- List of tennis tournaments
- Bermuda Open (1879-1976), tennis tournament founded as the Bermuda Open Tennis Championships
