= 2016 Zhuhai ITF Women's Pro Circuit =

- Date: 12–18 September
- Edition: 2nd
- Category: ITF Women's Circuit
- Prize money: $50,000
- Surface: Hard
- Location: Zhuhai, China
- Venue: Hengqin International Tennis Center

Champions

Singles
- (Belarus) Olga Govortsova

Doubles
- (India) Ankita Raina / (United Kingdom) Emily Webley-Smith
← 2015 ·	Zhuhai ITF Women's Pro Circuit	· 2017 →

The 2016 Zhuhai ITF Women's Pro Circuit was a professional tennis tournament played on outdoor hard courts. It was the 2nd edition of the tournament and part of the 2016 ITF Women's Circuit, offering a total of $50,000 in prize money. It took place at the Hengqin International Tennis Center in Zhuhai, China, on 12–18 September 2016.

== Singles main draw entrants ==
=== Seeds ===
Country	Player	Rank^{1}	Seed
RUS	Elizaveta Kulichkova	115	1
GER	Tatjana Maria	121	2
CHN	Liu Fangzhou	152	3
UZB	Nigina Abduraimova	172	4
TUR	İpek Soylu	190	5
RUS	Anastasia Pivovarova	191	6
TPE	Chang Kai-chen	198	7
TPE	Lee Ya-hsuan	203	8

- ^{1} Rankings as of 29 August 2016.

=== Other entrants ===
The following player received a wildcard into the singles main draw:

- (China) Cao Siqi
- (China) Wang Yan
- (China) You Xiaodi
- (China) Zhang Ying

The following players received entry from the qualifying draw:

- (China) Gao Xinyu
- (Belarus) Vera Lapko
- (Thailand) Noppawan Lertcheewakarn
- (Japan) Yuuki Tanaka

== Champions ==
=== Singles ===
- (Belarus) Olga Govortsova def. (Turkey) İpek Soylu, 6–1, 6–2

=== Doubles ===
- (India) Ankita Raina / (United Kingdom) Emily Webley-Smith def. (China) Guo Hanyu / (China) Jiang Xinyu, 6–4, 6–4
