= 2024 Davis Cup Finals =

Men's tennis event

- Date: 10–15 September and 19–24 November 2024
- Edition: 5th
- Draw: 16 teams
- Surface: Hard indoor
- Location: Bologna, Italy; Valencia, Spain; Zhuhai, China; Manchester, Great Britain; Málaga, Spain
- Venue: Unipol Arena; Pavelló Municipal Font de Sant Lluís; Hengqin Tennis Center; Manchester Arena; Martin Carpena Arena

Champions
- Italy
- Davis Cup

Defending champion Italy defeated the Netherlands in the final, 2–0 to win the 2024 Davis Cup. It was Italy's third Davis Cup title. It was the Netherlands' first final appearance in the tournament's history.

The Finals, formerly known as World Group, is the highest level of Davis Cup competition in 2024. The group stage took place from 10 to 15 September and the knockout stage was played from 19 to 24 November 2024. The ties were contested in a best-of-three rubbers format and played on one day. There were two singles followed, if necessary, by a doubles.

The event marked the final professional appearance of former singles world No. 1, 22-time singles major champion, two-time Olympic gold medalist, and four-time Davis Cup champion Rafael Nadal. It was also the last tournament for former doubles world No. 1 Wesley Koolhof.

== Knockout stage ==
=== Bracket ===
All knockout stage matches was taking place on indoor hard courts at the Martin Carpena Arena, Málaga, Spain.

Quarterfinals
21 November
Italy	2
Argentina	1
21 November
United States	1
Australia	2
20 November
Germany	2
Canada	0
19 November
Netherlands	2
Spain	1

Semifinals
23 November
Italy	2
Australia	0
22 November
Germany	0
Netherlands	2

Final
24 November
Italy	2
Netherlands	0

=== Team nominations ===
SR = Singles ranking, DR = Doubles ranking.
Rankings are as of 18 November 2024.

Argentina
Player	SR	DR
Báez	27	203
Cerúndolo	30	225
Etcheverry	39	204
Molteni	–	21
González	–	22
Captain: Coria

Australia
Player	SR	DR
de Minaur	9	–
Popyrin	24	853
Thompson	26	3
Kokkinakis	77	446
Ebden	–	13
Captain: Hewitt

Canada
Player	SR	DR
Shapovalov	56	–
Diallo	86	684
Galarneau	207	1370
Raonic	235	–
Pospisil	732	1370
Captain: Dancevic

Germany
Player	SR	DR
Struff	43	126
Altmaier	88	562
Hanfmann	95	84
Krawietz	–	7
Pütz	–	10
Captain: Kohlmann

Italy
Player	SR	DR
Sinner	1	338
Musetti	17	180
Berrettini	35	–
Vavassori	256	9
Bolelli	–	11
Captain: Volandri

Netherlands
Player	SR	DR
Griekspoor	40	137
Van de Zandschulp	80	188
De Jong	111	578
Koolhof	–	8
Captain: Haarhuis

Spain
Player	SR	DR
Alcaraz	3	–
Martínez	41	238
Bautista Agut	46	–
Nadal	154	845
Granollers	–	4
Captain: Ferrer

United States
Player	SR	DR
Fritz	4	165
Paul	12	–
Shelton	21	103
Ram	–	30
Krajicek	–	43
Captain: Bryan

== Knockout stage results ==
=== Quarterfinals ===
==== Italy vs. Argentina ====
Italy
2
Martin Carpena Arena, Málaga
21 November 2024

Argentina
1

			1	2	3
1	(Italy) (Argentina)	Lorenzo Musetti; Francisco Cerúndolo	4; 6	1; 6
2	(Italy) (Argentina)	Jannik Sinner; Sebastián Báez	6; 2	6; 1
3	(Italy) (Argentina)	Matteo Berrettini / Jannik Sinner; Máximo González / Andrés Molteni	6; 4	7; 5

==== United States vs. Australia ====
United States
1
Martin Carpena Arena, Málaga
21 November 2024

Australia
2

			1	2	3
1	(United States) (Australia)	Ben Shelton; Thanasi Kokkinakis	1; 6	6; 4	6^{14} 7^{16}
2	(United States) (Australia)	Taylor Fritz; Alex de Minaur	6; 3	6; 4
3	(United States) (Australia)	Tommy Paul / Ben Shelton; Matthew Ebden / Jordan Thompson	4; 6	4; 6

==== Germany vs. Canada ====
Germany
2
Martin Carpena Arena, Málaga
20 November 2024

Canada
0

			1	2	3
1	(Germany) (Canada)	Daniel Altmaier; Gabriel Diallo	7^{7} 6^{5}	6; 4
2	(Germany) (Canada)	Jan-Lennard Struff; Denis Shapovalov	4; 6	7; 5	7^{7} 6^{5}
3	(Germany) (Canada)	Kevin Krawietz / Tim Pütz; Vasek Pospisil / Denis Shapovalov				not played

==== Netherlands vs. Spain ====
Netherlands
2
Martin Carpena Arena, Málaga
19 November 2024

Spain
1

			1	2	3
1	(Netherlands) (Spain)	Botic van de Zandschulp; Rafael Nadal	6; 4	6; 4
2	(Netherlands) (Spain)	Tallon Griekspoor; Carlos Alcaraz	6^{0} 7^{7}	3; 6
3	(Netherlands) (Spain)	Wesley Koolhof / Botic van de Zandschulp; Carlos Alcaraz / Marcel Granollers	7^{7} 6^{4}	7^{7} 6^{3}

=== Semifinals ===
==== Italy vs. Australia ====
Italy
2
Martin Carpena Arena, Málaga
23 November 2024

Australia
0

			1	2	3
1	(Italy) (Australia)	Matteo Berrettini; Thanasi Kokkinakis	6^{6} 7^{8}	6; 3	7; 5
2	(Italy) (Australia)	Jannik Sinner; Alex de Minaur	6; 3	6; 4
3	(Italy) (Australia)	Simone Bolelli / Andrea Vavassori; Matthew Ebden / Jordan Thompson				not played

==== Germany vs. Netherlands ====
Germany
0
Martin Carpena Arena, Málaga
22 November 2024

Netherlands
2

			1	2	3
1	(Germany) (Netherlands)	Daniel Altmaier; Botic van de Zandschulp	4; 6	7^{14} 6^{12}	3; 6
2	(Germany) (Netherlands)	Jan-Lennard Struff; Tallon Griekspoor	7^{7} 6^{4}	5; 7	4; 6
3	(Germany) (Netherlands)	Kevin Krawietz / Tim Pütz; Wesley Koolhof / Botic van de Zandschulp				not played

=== Final ===
==== Italy vs. Netherlands ====
Italy
2
Martin Carpena Arena, Málaga
24 November 2024

Netherlands
0

			1	2	3
1	(Italy) (Netherlands)	Matteo Berrettini; Botic van de Zandschulp	6; 4	6; 2
2	(Italy) (Netherlands)	Jannik Sinner; Tallon Griekspoor	7^{7} 6^{2}	6; 2
3	(Italy) (Netherlands)	Simone Bolelli / Andrea Vavassori; Wesley Koolhof / Botic van de Zandschulp				not played

== Group stage ==
=== Participating teams ===
16 nations will take part in the group stage of the finals. The qualification was as follows:

- 2 finalists of the 2023 Finals (Australia and Italy)
- 2 wild card teams (Great Britain and Spain)
- 12 winners of the qualifying round, in February 2024

TH = Title holder, 2023F = Finalist from the 2023 tournament, WC = Wild card, H = Host

Participating teams
Argentina	Australia (2023F)	Belgium	Brazil
Canada	Chile	Czech Republic	Finland
France	Germany	Great Britain (WC) (H)	Italy (TH) (H)
Netherlands	Slovakia	Spain (WC) (H)	United States

=== Seeds ===
The seedings were based on the Davis Cup Ranking as of 18 March 2024. The winner of the 2023 Finals Italy were seeded No. 1 and Australia, as runners-up in 2023, were seeded No. 2, with Canada and Germany also seeded based on the latest Davis Cup nations ranking.

1. Italy
2. Australia
3. Canada
4. Germany

The remaining 12 nations were distributed in Pots 2–4 according to the latest Davis Cup nations ranking. Three host nations, Great Britain, Italy and Spain were placed in different groups.

=== Format ===
The 16 teams were divided in four round robin groups of four teams each. The top two teams in each group will qualify for the quarterfinals. Group A will be hosted in Bologna, Group B in Valencia, Group C in Zhuhai, and Group D in Manchester.

=== Team nominations ===
SR = Singles ranking, DR = Doubles ranking.
Rankings are as of 9 September 2024.

==== Group A ====
Belgium
Player	SR	DR
Bergs	72	630
Collignon	194	1143
Blockx	253	2303
Gillé	–	32
Vliegen	–	32
Captain: Darcis

Brazil
Player	SR	DR
Monteiro	76	538
Fonseca	158	511
Meligeni Alves	165	613
Matos	–	35
Melo	–	37
Captain: Oncins

Italy
Player	SR	DR
Cobolli	32	322
Arnaldi	33	–
Berrettini	43	–
Vavassori	243	9
Bolelli	–	12
Captain: Volandri

Netherlands
Player	SR	DR
Griekspoor	39	133
Van de Zandschulp	68	154
De Jong	131	631
Haase	1187	63
Koolhof	–	16
Captain: Haarhuis

==== Group B ====
Australia
Player	SR	DR
Popyrin	24	868
Thompson	29	7
Kokkinakis	78	429
Purcell	89	8
Ebden	–	5
Captain: Hewitt

Czech Republic
Player	SR	DR
Macháč	35	51
Lehečka	37	–
Menšík	67	–
Pavlásek	–	41
Captain: Navrátil

France
Player	SR	DR
Humbert	18	351
Fils	25	247
Rinderknech	58	352
Herbert	129	806
Roger-Vasselin	–	22
Captain: Mathieu

Spain
Player	SR	DR
Alcaraz	3	–
Martínez	42	313
Bautista Agut	62	–
Carreño Busta	207	–
Granollers	–	1
Captain: Ferrer

==== Group C ====
Chile
Player	SR	DR
Tabilo	22	151
Jarry	28	340
Garín	115	–
Barrios Vera	162	266
Soto	311	128
Captain: Massú

Germany
Player	SR	DR
Hanfmann	96	83
Marterer	104	–
Squire	187	–
Krawietz	–	13
Pütz	–	13
Captain: Kohlmann

Slovakia
Player	SR	DR
Kovalík	113	1399
Klein	127	–
Molčan	329	–
Gombos	408	–
Zelenay	–	693
Captain: Tóth

United States
Player	SR	DR
Nakashima	40	294
McDonald	149	84
Opelka	309	–
Ram	–	10
Krajicek	–	29
Captain: Bryan

==== Group D ====
Argentina
Player	SR	DR
Báez	26	194
Cerúndolo	31	296
Etcheverry	34	219
Molteni	–	30
González	–	34
Captain: Coria

Canada
Player	SR	DR
Auger-Aliassime	21	548
Shapovalov	100	–
Diallo	103	629
Galarneau	218	1367
Pospisil	664	1378
Captain: Dancevic

Finland
Player	SR	DR
Virtanen	109	471
Vasa	703	360
Kaukovalta	831	752
Heliövaara	–	15
Niklas-Salminen	–	106
Captain: Nieminen

Great Britain
Player	SR	DR
Draper	20	538
Harris	101	486
Evans	178	867
Patten	–	17
Skupski	–	19
Captain: Smith

== Group stage results ==
Qualified for the Knockout stage
Eliminated

=== Overview ===
G = Group, T = Ties, M = Matches, S = Sets

G	Winner				Runner-up				Third				Fourth			
G	Nation	T	M	S	Nation	T	M	S	Nation	T	M	S	Nation	T	M	S
A	Italy	3–0	6–3	14–10	Netherlands	1–2	4–5	12–10	Brazil	1–2	4–5	10–13	Belgium	1–2	4–5	11–14
B	Spain	3–0	7–2	15–9	Australia	2–1	6–3	14–8	France	1–2	4–5	11–12	Czech Republic	0–3	1–8	6–17
C	United States	3–0	8–1	16–7	Germany	2–1	7–2	15–5	Chile	1–2	2–7	8–16	Slovakia	0–3	1–8	6–17
D	Canada	3–0	7–2	15–4	Argentina	2–1	6–3	12–9	Great Britain	1–2	4–5	8–10	Finland	0–3	1–8	4–16

=== Group A ===
Pos.	Country	Ties	Matches	Sets	Sets %	Games	Games %
1	Italy	3–0	6–3	14–10	58%	134–130	51%
2	Netherlands	1–2	4–5	12–10	55%	121–122	50%
3	Brazil	1–2	4–5	10–13	43%	127–132	49%
4	Belgium	1–2	4–5	11–14	44%	133–131	50%

==== Netherlands vs. Belgium ====
Netherlands
1
Unipol Arena, Bologna
10 September 2024

Belgium
2

			1	2	3
1	(Netherlands) (Belgium)	Botic van de Zandschulp; Raphaël Collignon	7; 5	7^{8} 6^{6}
2	(Netherlands) (Belgium)	Tallon Griekspoor; Zizou Bergs	2; 6	7^{7} 6^{2}	3; 6
3	(Netherlands) (Belgium)	Wesley Koolhof / Botic van de Zandschulp; Sander Gillé / Joran Vliegen	6; 4	6^{5} 7^{7}	4; 6

==== Italy vs. Brazil ====
Italy
2
Unipol Arena, Bologna
11 September 2024

Brazil
1

			1	2	3
1	(Italy) (Brazil)	Matteo Berrettini; João Fonseca	6; 1	7^{7} 6^{5}
2	(Italy) (Brazil)	Matteo Arnaldi; Thiago Monteiro	7; 5	6^{4} 7^{7}	7^{7} 6^{5}
3	(Italy) (Brazil)	Simone Bolelli / Andrea Vavassori; Rafael Matos / Marcelo Melo	7^{7} 6^{3}	6^{6} 7^{8}	5; 7

==== Netherlands vs. Brazil ====
Netherlands
2
Unipol Arena, Bologna
12 September 2024

Brazil
1

			1	2	3
1	(Netherlands) (Brazil)	Botic van de Zandschulp; João Fonseca	4; 6	6^{3} 7^{7}
2	(Netherlands) (Brazil)	Tallon Griekspoor; Thiago Monteiro	7^{7} 6^{2}	6; 4
3	(Netherlands) (Brazil)	Wesley Koolhof / Botic van de Zandschulp; Rafael Matos / Marcelo Melo	6; 4	7^{7} 6^{5}

==== Italy vs. Belgium ====
Italy
2
Unipol Arena, Bologna
13 September 2024

Belgium
1

			1	2	3
1	(Italy) (Belgium)	Matteo Berrettini; Alexander Blockx	3; 6	6; 2	7; 5
2	(Italy) (Belgium)	Flavio Cobolli; Zizou Bergs	3; 6	7^{7} 6^{5}	0; 6
3	(Italy) (Belgium)	Simone Bolelli / Andrea Vavassori; Sander Gillé / Joran Vliegen	7^{7} 6^{2}	7; 5

==== Belgium vs. Brazil ====
Belgium
1
Unipol Arena, Bologna
14 September 2024

Brazil
2

			1	2	3
1	(Belgium) (Brazil)	Raphaël Collignon; João Fonseca	3; 6	7^{7} 6^{2}	3; 6
2	(Belgium) (Brazil)	Zizou Bergs; Thiago Monteiro	6; 4	6^{5} 7^{7}	5; 7
3	(Belgium) (Brazil)	Sander Gillé / Joran Vliegen; Rafael Matos / Felipe Meligeni Alves	6; 3	3; 6	6; 4

==== Italy vs. Netherlands ====
Italy
2
Unipol Arena, Bologna
15 September 2024

Netherlands
1

			1	2	3
1	(Italy) (Netherlands)	Matteo Berrettini; Botic van de Zandschulp	3; 6	6; 4	6; 4
2	(Italy) (Netherlands)	Flavio Cobolli; Tallon Griekspoor	7^{7} 6^{4}	4; 6	6; 3
3	(Italy) (Netherlands)	Simone Bolelli / Andrea Vavassori; Wesley Koolhof / Botic van de Zandschulp	6^{6} 7^{8}	5; 7

=== Group B ===
Pos.	Country	Ties	Matches	Sets	Sets %	Games	Games %
1	Spain	3–0	7–2	15–9	63%	130–109	54%
2	Australia	2–1	6–3	14–8	64%	120–97	55%
3	France	1–2	4–5	11–12	48%	120–119	50%
4	Czech Republic	0–3	1–8	6–17	26%	94–139	40%

==== Australia vs. France ====
Australia
2
Pavelló Municipal Font de Sant Lluís, Valencia
10 September 2024

France
1

			1	2	3
1	(Australia) (France)	Thanasi Kokkinakis; Arthur Fils	7^{7} 6^{4}	7^{7} 6^{3}
2	(Australia) (France)	Alexei Popyrin; Ugo Humbert	3; 6	2; 6
3	(Australia) (France)	Matthew Ebden / Max Purcell; Pierre-Hugues Herbert / Édouard Roger-Vasselin	7; 5	5; 7	6; 3

==== Czech Republic vs. Spain ====
Czech Republic
0
Pavelló Municipal Font de Sant Lluís, Valencia
11 September 2024

Spain
3

			1	2	3
1	(Czech Republic) (Spain)	Jiří Lehečka; Roberto Bautista Agut	6^{1} 7^{7}	4; 6
2	(Czech Republic) (Spain)	Tomáš Macháč; Carlos Alcaraz	7^{7} 6^{3}	1; 6	0; 0	retired
3	(Czech Republic) (Spain)	Jakub Menšík / Adam Pavlásek; Carlos Alcaraz / Marcel Granollers	7^{7} 6^{2}	3; 6	6^{2} 7^{7}

Note: Alcaraz's retirement victory over Macháč counted as a 6–7, 6–1, 6–0 win.

==== Australia vs. Czech Republic ====
Australia
3
Pavelló Municipal Font de Sant Lluís, Valencia
12 September 2024

Czech Republic
0

			1	2	3
1	(Australia) (Czech Republic)	Thanasi Kokkinakis; Jakub Menšík	6; 2	6^{2} 7^{7}	6; 3
2	(Australia) (Czech Republic)	Alexei Popyrin; Tomáš Macháč	1; 0			retired
3	(Australia) (Czech Republic)	Matthew Ebden / Max Purcell; Jakub Menšík / Adam Pavlásek	6; 4	6; 2

Note: Popyrin's retirement victory over Macháč counted as a 6–0, 6–0 win.

==== France vs. Spain ====
France
1
Pavelló Municipal Font de Sant Lluís, Valencia
13 September 2024

Spain
2

			1	2	3
1	(France) (Spain)	Arthur Fils; Roberto Bautista Agut	6; 2	5; 7	3; 6
2	(France) (Spain)	Ugo Humbert; Carlos Alcaraz	3; 6	3; 6
3	(France) (Spain)	Pierre-Hugues Herbert / Édouard Roger-Vasselin; Pablo Carreño Busta / Marcel Granollers	7^{9} 6^{7}	6^{10} 7^{12}	10; 8

==== Czech Republic vs. France ====
Czech Republic
1
Pavelló Municipal Font de Sant Lluís, Valencia
14 September 2024

France
2

			1	2	3
1	(Czech Republic) (France)	Jakub Menšík; Arthur Rinderknech	2; 6	6; 3	7; 5
2	(Czech Republic) (France)	Jiří Lehečka; Arthur Fils	7^{7} 6^{5}	5; 7	4; 6
3	(Czech Republic) (France)	Jakub Menšík / Adam Pavlásek; Pierre-Hugues Herbert / Arthur Rinderknech	6^{4} 7^{7}	5; 7

==== Australia vs. Spain ====
Australia
1
Pavelló Municipal Font de Sant Lluís, Valencia
15 September 2024

Spain
2

			1	2	3
1	(Australia) (Spain)	Jordan Thompson; Pablo Carreño Busta	6; 2	2; 6	6^{3} 7^{7}
2	(Australia) (Spain)	Alexei Popyrin; Pedro Martínez	6; 4	6; 4
3	(Australia) (Spain)	Matthew Ebden / Max Purcell; Marcel Granollers / Pedro Martínez	7; 5	4; 6	4; 6

=== Group C ===
Pos.	Country	Ties	Matches	Sets	Sets %	Games	Games %
1	United States	3–0	8–1	16–7	70%	126–110	53%
2	Germany	2–1	7–2	15–5	75%	114–87	57%
3	Chile	1–2	2–7	8–16	33%	111–131	46%
4	Slovakia	0–3	1–8	6–17	26%	102–125	45%

==== Germany vs. Slovakia ====
Germany
3
Hengqin Tennis Center, Zhuhai
10 September 2024

Slovakia
0

			1	2	3
1	(Germany) (Slovakia)	Maximilian Marterer; Lukáš Klein	6; 4	7; 5
2	(Germany) (Slovakia)	Yannick Hanfmann; Jozef Kovalík	3; 6	6; 3	7^{7} 6^{3}
3	(Germany) (Slovakia)	Kevin Krawietz / Tim Pütz; Lukáš Klein / Igor Zelenay	7; 5	6; 3

==== United States vs. Chile ====
United States
3
Hengqin Tennis Center, Zhuhai
11 September 2024

Chile
0

			1	2	3
1	(United States) (Chile)	Reilly Opelka; Cristian Garín	6; 3	4; 6	7^{7} 6^{3}
2	(United States) (Chile)	Brandon Nakashima; Alejandro Tabilo	7^{7} 6^{5}	2; 6	7^{7} 6^{3}
3	(United States) (Chile)	Austin Krajicek / Rajeev Ram; Tomás Barrios Vera / Matías Soto	4; 6	6; 4	7^{7} 6^{3}

==== Germany vs. Chile ====
Germany
3
Hengqin Tennis Center, Zhuhai
12 September 2024

Chile
0

			1	2	3
1	(Germany) (Chile)	Maximilian Marterer; Tomás Barrios Vera	6; 1	6; 3
2	(Germany) (Chile)	Yannick Hanfmann; Alejandro Tabilo	7; 5	6; 4
3	(Germany) (Chile)	Kevin Krawietz / Tim Pütz; Tomás Barrios Vera / Matías Soto	6; 1	6; 3

==== United States vs. Slovakia ====
United States
3
Hengqin Tennis Center, Zhuhai
13 September 2024

Slovakia
0

			1	2	3
1	(United States) (Slovakia)	Mackenzie McDonald; Lukáš Klein	6; 4	6; 3
2	(United States) (Slovakia)	Brandon Nakashima; Jozef Kovalík	6; 3	6; 3
3	(United States) (Slovakia)	Austin Krajicek / Rajeev Ram; Norbert Gombos / Lukáš Klein	6^{4} 7^{7}	7^{7} 6^{4}	10; 1

==== Germany vs. United States ====
Germany
1
Hengqin Tennis Center, Zhuhai
14 September 2024

United States
2

			1	2	3
1	(Germany) (United States)	Henri Squire; Reilly Opelka	7^{7} 6^{4}	6^{9} 7^{11}	3; 6
2	(Germany) (United States)	Maximilian Marterer; Brandon Nakashima	4; 6	2; 6
3	(Germany) (United States)	Kevin Krawietz / Tim Pütz; Austin Krajicek / Rajeev Ram	6; 1	7^{7} 6^{4}

==== Slovakia vs. Chile ====
Slovakia
1
Hengqin Tennis Center, Zhuhai
15 September 2024

Chile
2

			1	2	3
1	(Slovakia) (Chile)	Norbert Gombos; Cristian Garín	6; 2	1; 6	2; 6
2	(Slovakia) (Chile)	Jozef Kovalík; Alejandro Tabilo	6; 4	6^{5} 7^{7}	6; 1
3	(Slovakia) (Chile)	Norbert Gombos / Lukáš Klein; Tomás Barrios Vera / Nicolás Jarry	4; 6	7^{7} 6^{3}	6^{5} 7^{7}

=== Group D ===
Pos.	Country	Ties	Matches	Sets	Sets %	Games	Games %
1	Canada	3–0	7–2	15–4	79%	111–77	59%
2	Argentina	2–1	6–3	12–9	57%	112–98	53%
3	Great Britain	1–2	4–5	8–10	44%	97–104	48%
4	Finland	0–3	1–8	4–16	20%	83–124	40%

==== Canada vs. Argentina ====
Canada
2
Manchester Arena, Manchester
10 September 2024

Argentina
1

			1	2	3
1	(Canada) (Argentina)	Denis Shapovalov; Francisco Cerúndolo	7; 5	6; 3
2	(Canada) (Argentina)	Félix Auger-Aliassime; Sebastián Báez	6; 3	6; 3
3	(Canada) (Argentina)	Vasek Pospisil / Denis Shapovalov; Máximo González / Andrés Molteni	6; 2	3; 6	2; 6

==== Finland vs. Great Britain ====
Finland
1
Manchester Arena, Manchester
11 September 2024

Great Britain
2

			1	2	3
1	(Finland) (United Kingdom)	Eero Vasa; Dan Evans	6^{3} 7^{7}	2; 6
2	(Finland) (United Kingdom)	Otto Virtanen; Billy Harris	4; 6	6^{4} 7^{7}
3	(Finland) (United Kingdom)	Harri Heliövaara / Otto Virtanen; Dan Evans / Neal Skupski	7^{7} 6^{4}	7; 5

==== Canada vs. Finland ====
Canada
3
Manchester Arena, Manchester
12 September 2024

Finland
0

			1	2	3
1	(Canada) (Finland)	Denis Shapovalov; Eero Vasa	7^{7} 6^{2}	6; 2
2	(Canada) (Finland)	Félix Auger-Aliassime; Otto Virtanen	6; 2	6; 3
3	(Canada) (Finland)	Félix Auger-Aliassime / Denis Shapovalov; Harri Heliövaara / Otto Virtanen	6; 2	7; 5

==== Great Britain vs. Argentina ====
Great Britain
1
Manchester Arena, Manchester
13 September 2024

Argentina
2

			1	2	3
1	(United Kingdom) (Argentina)	Dan Evans; Tomás Martín Etcheverry	2; 6	5; 7
2	(United Kingdom) (Argentina)	Jack Draper; Francisco Cerúndolo	6^{4} 7^{7}	5; 7
3	(United Kingdom) (Argentina)	Dan Evans / Neal Skupski; Máximo González / Andrés Molteni	6; 3	7; 5

==== Finland vs. Argentina ====
Finland
0
Manchester Arena, Manchester
14 September 2024

Argentina
3

			1	2	3
1	(Finland) (Argentina)	Eero Vasa; Tomás Martín Etcheverry	6^{5} 7^{7}	3; 6
2	(Finland) (Argentina)	Otto Virtanen; Francisco Cerúndolo	7^{7} 6^{4}	1; 6	0; 6
3	(Finland) (Argentina)	Harri Heliövaara / Patrick Kaukovalta; Máximo González / Andrés Molteni	7^{7} 6^{3}	4; 6	3; 6

==== Canada vs. Great Britain ====
Canada
2
Manchester Arena, Manchester
15 September 2024

Great Britain
1

			1	2	3
1	(Canada) (United Kingdom)	Denis Shapovalov; Dan Evans	6; 0	7; 5
2	(Canada) (United Kingdom)	Félix Auger-Aliassime; Jack Draper	7^{10} 6^{8}	7; 5
3	(Canada) (United Kingdom)	Gabriel Diallo / Alexis Galarneau; Henry Patten / Neal Skupski	6^{4} 7^{7}	4; 6
