= 2015 Zhuhai ITF Women's Pro Circuit =

- Date: 28 September–4 October
- Edition: 1st
- Category: ITF Women's Circuit
- Prize money: $50,000
- Surface: Hard
- Location: Zhuhai, China

Champions

Singles
- (Chinese Taipei) Chang Kai-chen

Doubles
- (China) Xu Shilin / (China) You Xiaodi
Zhuhai ITF Women's Pro Circuit	· 2016 →

The 2015 Zhuhai ITF Women's Pro Circuit was a professional tennis tournament played on outdoor hard courts. It was the first edition of the tournament and part of the 2015 ITF Women's Circuit, offering a total of $50,000 in prize money. It took place at the Hengqin International Tennis Center in Zhuhai, China, on 28 September–4 October 2015.

== Singles main draw entrants ==
=== Seeds ===
Country	Player	Rank^{1}	Seed
CHN	Wang Qiang	111	1
SWE	Rebecca Peterson	147	2
TPE	Chang Kai-chen	151	3
TUN	Ons Jabeur	153	4
JPN	Eri Hozumi	167	5
CHN	Zhang Shuai	190	6
JPN	Riko Sawayanagi	191	7
ESP	Paula Badosa Gibert	198	8

- ^{1} Rankings as of 21 September 2015

=== Other entrants ===
The following players received wildcards into the singles main draw:

- (China) Tian Ran
- (China) Wang Qiang
- (China) Xu Shilin
- (China) You Xiaodi

The following players received entry from the qualifying draw:

- (China) Chen Jiahui
- (China) Gai Ao
- (China) Xun Fangying
- (China) Ye Qiuyu

== Champions ==
=== Singles ===
- (Chinese Taipei) Chang Kai-chen def. (China) Zhang Yuxuan, 4–6, 6–1, 7–6^{(7–0)}

=== Doubles ===
- (China) Xu Shilin / (China) You Xiaodi def. (Russia) Irina Khromacheva / (United Kingdom) Emily Webley-Smith, 3–6, 6–2, [10–4]
