= 2015 Zhuhai ITF Women's Pro Circuit – Singles =

Singles
- 2015 Zhuhai ITF Women's Pro Circuit

Final
- Champion: (Chinese Taipei) Chang Kai-chen
- Runner-up: (China) Zhang Yuxuan
- Score: 4–6, 6–1, 7–6^{(7–0)}

Events
Singles	Doubles
Zhuhai ITF Women's Pro Circuit	· 2016 →

This was a new event to the ITF Women's Circuit.

Chang Kai-chen won the inaugural title, defeating Zhang Yuxuan in the final, 4–6, 6–1, 7–6^{(7–0)}.

== Seeds ==
1. (China) Wang Qiang (first round)
2. (Sweden) Rebecca Peterson (second round)
3. (Chinese Taipei) Chang Kai-chen (champion)
4. (Tunisia) Ons Jabeur (first round)
5. (Japan) Eri Hozumi (first round)
6. (China) Zhang Shuai (quarterfinals; withdrew)
7. (Japan) Riko Sawayanagi (quarterfinals)
8. (Spain) Paula Badosa Gibert (first round)

== Main draw ==
=== Key ===
- Q = Qualifier
- WC = Wild card
- LL = Lucky loser
- Alt = Alternate
- SE = Special exempt
- PR = Protected ranking
- ITF = ITF entry
- JE = Junior exempt
- w/o = Walkover
- r = Retired
- d = Defaulted
- SR = Special ranking

=== Finals ===
Semifinals
(Hong Kong) Zhang Ling	4	4
(China) Zhang Yuxuan	6	6
3	(Chinese Taipei) Chang Kai-chen	6^{3}	6	6
WC	(China) Xu Shilin	7^{7}	3	4

Final
(China) Zhang Yuxuan	6	1	6^{0}
3	(Chinese Taipei) Chang Kai-chen	4	6	7^{7}

=== Top half ===
First round
1/WC	(China) Q Wang	6^{8}	3
(Hong Kong) L Zhang	7^{10}	6
Q	(China) A Gai	3	4
(United Kingdom) E Webley-Smith	6	6
(China) K Zhang	6	6
(Japan) J Namigata	2	3
WC	(China) R Tian	6	2	0
7	(Japan) R Sawayanagi	3	6	6
4	(Tunisia) O Jabeur	6	6^{6}	5
(South Korea) S-j Jang	1	7^{8}	7
(Russia) N Dzalamidze	6^{1}	5
(China) Yu Zhang	7^{7}	7
Q	(China) F Xun	2	6	6
WC	(China) X You	6	4	3
(Japan) M Kato	6	7
5	(Japan) E Hozumi	4	5

Second round
(Hong Kong) L Zhang	6	6
(United Kingdom) E Webley-Smith	3	2
(China) K Zhang	5	4
7	(Japan) R Sawayanagi	7	6
(South Korea) S-j Jang	3	6	2
(China) Yu Zhang	6	2	6
Q	(China) F Xun	4	4
(Japan) M Kato	6	6

Quarterfinals
(Hong Kong) L Zhang	1	6	6
7	(Japan) R Sawayanagi	6	2	4
(China) Yu Zhang	6	6
(Japan) M Kato	4	3

Semifinals
(Hong Kong) L Zhang	4	4
(China) Yu Zhang	6	6

=== Bottom half ===
First round
6	(China) S Zhang	6	6
(Russia) I Khromacheva	2	0
(Japan) H Kuwata	6	6
Q	(China) Q Ye	4	1
(China) Jia Lu	6	6
(India) A Raina	3	3
(China) Y Wang	4	2
3	(Chinese Taipei) K-c Chang	6	6
8	(Spain) P Badosa Gibert	6^{6}	3
(China) Jin Lu	7^{8}	6
WC	(China) S Xu	5	6	6
Q	(China) J Chen	7	0	3
(Chinese Taipei) Y-h Lee	6	3
(Russia) A Morgina	3	0^{r}
(South Korea) N-l Han	4	3
2	(Sweden) R Peterson	6	6

Second round
6	(China) S Zhang	6	6
(Japan) H Kuwata	0	3
(China) Jia Lu	4	3
3	(Chinese Taipei) K-c Chang	6	6
(China) Jin Lu	4	6^{8}
WC	(China) S Xu	6	7^{10}
(Chinese Taipei) Y-h Lee	6	6
2	(Sweden) R Peterson	1	1

Quarterfinals
6	(China) S Zhang
3	(Chinese Taipei) K-c Chang	w/o
WC	(China) S Xu	6	4	6
(Chinese Taipei) Y-h Lee	0	6	1

Semifinals
3	(Chinese Taipei) K-c Chang	6^{3}	6	6
WC	(China) S Xu	7^{7}	3	4
