= 2016 Zhuhai ITF Women's Pro Circuit – Doubles =

Doubles
- 2016 Zhuhai ITF Women's Pro Circuit

Final
- Champions: (India) Ankita Raina (United Kingdom) Emily Webley-Smith
- Runners-up: (China) Guo Hanyu (China) Jiang Xinyu
- Score: 6–4, 6–4

Events
Singles	Doubles
← 2015 ·	Zhuhai ITF Women's Pro Circuit	· 2017 →

Xu Shilin and You Xiaodi were the defending champions, but Xu chose not to participate. You partnered Zhu Lin, but lost in the first round.

Ankita Raina and Emily Webley-Smith won the title, defeating Guo Hanyu and Jiang Xinyu in the final, 6–4, 6–4.

== Seeds ==
1. (China) You Xiaodi / (China) Zhu Lin (first round)
2. (Chinese Taipei) Chan Chin-wei / (Chinese Taipei) Hsu Ching-wen (first round)
3. (Thailand) Nicha Lertpitaksinchai / (Thailand) Peangtarn Plipuech (quarterfinals)
4. (Belarus) Olga Govortsova / (Belarus) Lidziya Marozava (quarterfinals)

== Draw ==
=== Key ===
- Q = Qualifier
- WC = Wild card
- LL = Lucky loser
- Alt = Alternate
- SE = Special exempt
- PR = Protected ranking
- ITF = ITF entry
- JE = Junior exempt
- w/o = Walkover
- r = Retired
- d = Defaulted
- SR = Special ranking

First round
1	(China) X You (China) L Zhu	2	6	[8]
(Poland) K Piter (Switzerland) J Teichmann	6	4	[10]
(Thailand) K Buayam (Chinese Taipei) P-c Lee	6	6
WC	(China) X Gao (China) Y Zhang	3	3
4	(Belarus) O Govortsova (Belarus) L Marozava	6	7^{7}
(China) Y Li (China) Y Wang	1	6^{3}
(India) A Raina (United Kingdom) E Webley-Smith	4	6	[10]
(China) J Kang (China) X Sun	6	3	[8]
WC	(China) Y Liu (China) Y Sheng	3	0
(China) C Liu (China) Jia Lu	6	6
(Italy) C Ferrando (Georgia (country)) S Shapatava	5	2
3	(Thailand) N Lertpitaksinchai (Thailand) Pe Plipuech	7	6
(Japan) J Namigata (Japan) Y Tanaka	3	7^{7}	[5]
WC	(China) H Guo (China) X Jiang	6	6^{1}	[10]
(China) R Tian (China) F Xun	7^{7}	3	[10]
2	(Chinese Taipei) C-w Chan (Chinese Taipei) C-w Hsu	6^{4}	6	[6]

Quarterfinals
(Poland) K Piter (Switzerland) J Teichmann
(Thailand) K Buayam (Chinese Taipei) P-c Lee	w/o
4	(Belarus) O Govortsova (Belarus) L Marozava	5	5
(India) A Raina (United Kingdom) E Webley-Smith	7	7
(China) C Liu (China) Jia Lu	6	7^{7}
3	(Thailand) N Lertpitaksinchai (Thailand) Pe Plipuech	2	6^{3}
WC	(China) H Guo (China) X Jiang	6	7
(China) R Tian (China) F Xun	0	5

Semifinals
(Thailand) K Buayam (Chinese Taipei) P-c Lee	4	6	[6]
(India) A Raina (United Kingdom) E Webley-Smith	6	0	[10]
(China) C Liu (China) Jia Lu	4	5
WC	(China) H Guo (China) X Jiang	6	7

Final
(India) A Raina (United Kingdom) E Webley-Smith	6	6
WC	(China) H Guo (China) X Jiang	4	4
