= 2026 Halle Open – Doubles =

Doubles
- 2026 Halle Open

Final
- Champions: (France) Théo Arribagé (France) Albano Olivetti
- Runners-up: (Germany) Daniel Altmaier (Brazil) João Fonseca
- Score: 7–6^{(7–2)}, 6–4

Details
- Draw: 16
- Seeds: 4

Events
Singles	Doubles
- Halle Open

Théo Arribagé and Albano Olivetti defeated Daniel Altmaier and João Fonseca in the final, 7–6^{(7–2)}, 6–4 to win the doubles tennis title at the 2026 Halle Open.

Kevin Krawietz and Tim Pütz were the defending champions, but lost in the first round to Robert Galloway and John Peers.

== Seeds ==
1. (Germany) Kevin Krawietz / (Germany) Tim Pütz (first round)
2. (Portugal) Francisco Cabral / (Austria) Lucas Miedler (first round)
3. (Czech Republic) Adam Pavlásek / (Italy) Andrea Vavassori (first round)
4. (United States) Robert Cash / (United States) JJ Tracy (quarterfinals)

== Draw ==
Key

- Q = Qualifier
- WC = Wild card
- LL = Lucky loser
- Alt = Alternate
- ITF = ITF entry
- PR = Protected ranking
- SR = Special ranking
- SE = Special exempt
- JE = Junior exempt
- JR = Junior Accelerator Programme entrant
- CO = College Accelerator Programme entrant
- NG = Next Gen Accelerator Program entrant
- w/o = Walkover
- r = Retired
- d = Defaulted

=== Draw ===
First round
1	(Germany) K Krawietz (Germany) T Pütz	6^{3}	6^{8}
Q	(United States) R Galloway (Australia) J Peers	7^{7}	7^{10}
(Argentina) TM Etcheverry (Serbia) M Kecmanović	6^{4}	3
(Germany) J Schnaitter (Germany) M Wallner	7^{7}	6
4	(United States) R Cash (United States) JJ Tracy	6	7
WC	(Germany) Y Hanfmann (Germany) J-L Struff	3	5
(Brazil) O Luz (Brazil) R Matos	0	4
(France) T Arribagé (France) A Olivetti	6	6
(Belgium) Z Bergs (Kazakhstan) A Bublik	4	7^{7}	[5]
(Brazil) M Melo (Germany) A Zverev	6	6^{4}	[10]
(Italy) F Cobolli (United States) B Shelton	2	7^{7}	[10]
3	(Czech Republic) A Pavlásek (Italy) A Vavassori	6	6^{5}	[8]
LL	(Germany) D Altmaier (Brazil) J Fonseca	6	7^{7}
(United States) E Quinn (United States) L Tien	2	6^{1}
(France) S Doumbia (Australia) M Polmans	6	6
2	(Portugal) F Cabral (Austria) L Miedler	2	4

Quarterfinals
Q	(United States) R Galloway (Australia) J Peers	6	7^{7}
(Germany) J Schnaitter (Germany) M Wallner	3	6^{4}
4	(United States) R Cash (United States) JJ Tracy	4	4
(France) T Arribagé (France) A Olivetti	6	6
(Brazil) M Melo (Germany) A Zverev	6^{5}	3
(Italy) F Cobolli (United States) B Shelton	7^{7}	6
LL	(Germany) D Altmaier (Brazil) J Fonseca	6	7^{8}
(France) S Doumbia (Australia) M Polmans	4	6^{6}

Semifinals
Q	(United States) R Galloway (Australia) J Peers
(France) T Arribagé (France) A Olivetti	w/o
(Italy) F Cobolli (United States) B Shelton	6^{6}	7^{16}	[9]
LL	(Germany) D Altmaier (Brazil) J Fonseca	7^{8}	6^{14}	[11]

Final
(France) T Arribagé (France) A Olivetti	7^{7}	6
LL	(Germany) D Altmaier (Brazil) J Fonseca	6^{2}	4

== Qualifying ==
=== Seeds ===
1. (Netherlands) Sander Arends / (Netherlands) David Pel (first round, withdrew)
2. (Czech Republic) Petr Nouza / (Austria) Neil Oberleitner (first round)

=== Qualifiers ===
1. (United States) Robert Galloway / (Australia) John Peers

=== Lucky losers ===
1. (Germany) Daniel Altmaier / (Brazil) João Fonseca

=== Qualifying draw ===
First round
1	(Netherlands) Sander Arends (Netherlands) David Pel
(United States) Robert Galloway (Australia) John Peers	w/o
WC	(Germany) Daniel Altmaier (Brazil) João Fonseca	7^{7}	7^{7}
2	(Czech Republic) Petr Nouza (Austria) Neil Oberleitner	6^{5}	6^{2}

Qualifying competition
(United States) Robert Galloway (Australia) John Peers	7	6
WC	(Germany) Daniel Altmaier (Brazil) João Fonseca	5	2
