= 2015 Zhuhai ITF Women's Pro Circuit – Doubles =

Doubles
- 2015 Zhuhai ITF Women's Pro Circuit

Final
- Champions: (China) Xu Shilin (China) You Xiaodi
- Runners-up: (Russia) Irina Khromacheva (United Kingdom) Emily Webley-Smith
- Score: 3–6, 6–2, [10–4]

Events
Singles	Doubles
Zhuhai ITF Women's Pro Circuit	· 2016 →

This was a new event to the ITF Women's Circuit.

Chinese duo Xu Shilin and You Xiaodi won the inaugural title, defeating the top seeds Irina Khromacheva and Emily Webley-Smith in the final, 3–6, 6–2, [10–4].

== Seeds ==
1. (Russia) Irina Khromacheva / (United Kingdom) Emily Webley-Smith (final)
2. (Japan) Eri Hozumi / (Japan) Miyu Kato (quarterfinals)
3. (Japan) Hiroko Kuwata / (Sweden) Rebecca Peterson (semifinals)
4. (Japan) Junri Namigata / (Japan) Riko Sawayanagi (semifinals)

== Draw ==
=== Key ===
- Q = Qualifier
- WC = Wild card
- LL = Lucky loser
- Alt = Alternate
- SE = Special exempt
- PR = Protected ranking
- ITF = ITF entry
- JE = Junior exempt
- w/o = Walkover
- r = Retired
- d = Defaulted
- SR = Special ranking

First round
1	(Russia) I Khromacheva (United Kingdom) E Webley-Smith	6	6
WC	(China) C Chen (China) J Kang	1	4
(China) Y Li (China) X Sun	1	3
(South Korea) N-l Han (South Korea) S-j Jang	6	6
3	(Japan) H Kuwata (Sweden) R Peterson	6	6
(China) F Xun (China) D Zhao	1	3
(China) Jia Lu (Russia) A Morgina	3	3
(China) Jin Lu (Hong Kong) L Zhang	6	6
WC	(China) Q Wang (China) Y Wang	6	6
(Chinese Taipei) Y-h Lee (India) A Raina	3	3
(China) R Tian (China) Q Ye	4	6^{9}
4	(Japan) J Namigata (Japan) R Sawayanagi	6	7^{11}
(China) S Xu (China) X You	6	6
WC	(China) D Wang (China) Y Yu	3	1
(China) J Chen (China) Yi Zhang	4	3
2	(Japan) E Hozumi (Japan) M Kato	6	6

Quarterfinals
1	(Russia) I Khromacheva (United Kingdom) E Webley-Smith	6	6
(South Korea) N-l Han (South Korea) S-j Jang	4	3
3	(Japan) H Kuwata (Sweden) R Peterson	2	6	[10]
(China) Jin Lu (Hong Kong) L Zhang	6	3	[8]
WC	(China) Q Wang (China) Y Wang	3	3
4	(Japan) J Namigata (Japan) R Sawayanagi	6	6
(China) S Xu (China) X You	6	6
2	(Japan) E Hozumi (Japan) M Kato	4	3

Semifinals
1	(Russia) I Khromacheva (United Kingdom) E Webley-Smith	6	7^{7}
3	(Japan) H Kuwata (Sweden) R Peterson	2	6^{3}
4	(Japan) J Namigata (Japan) R Sawayanagi	1	4
(China) S Xu (China) X You	6	6

Final
1	(Russia) I Khromacheva (United Kingdom) E Webley-Smith	6	2	[4]
(China) S Xu (China) X You	3	6	[10]
