= 2026 Halle Open – Singles =

Singles
- 2026 Halle Open

Final
- Champion: (United States) Frances Tiafoe
- Runner-up: (United States) Taylor Fritz
- Score: 6–4, 6–4

Events
Singles	Doubles
- Halle Open

Frances Tiafoe defeated Taylor Fritz 6–4, 6–4 in the final, to win the singles tennis title at the 2026 Halle Open. It was his fourth ATP Tour title, and he saved three match points en route (in the quarterfinals against Félix Auger-Aliassime). Tiafoe became the first American to win the title.

Alexander Bublik was the defending champion, but lost in the first round to Mattia Bellucci. This marked only the second time that the defending champion lost in the opening round, after 2003 when Karol Kučera defeated Yevgeny Kafelnikov.

== Seeds ==
1. (Germany) Alexander Zverev (semifinals)
2. (Canada) Félix Auger-Aliassime (quarterfinals)
3. (United States) Ben Shelton (quarterfinals)
4. Daniil Medvedev (quarterfinals)
5. (United States) Taylor Fritz (final)
6. (Italy) Flavio Cobolli (first round)
7. (Kazakhstan) Alexander Bublik (first round)
8. Andrey Rublev (first round)

== Draw ==
Key

- Q = Qualifier
- WC = Wild card
- LL = Lucky loser
- Alt = Alternate
- ITF = ITF entry
- PR = Protected ranking
- SR = Special ranking
- SE = Special exempt
- JE = Junior exempt
- JR = Junior Accelerator Programme entrant
- CO = College Accelerator Programme entrant
- NG = Next Gen Accelerator Program entrant
- w/o = Walkover
- r = Retired
- d = Defaulted

=== Finals ===
Semifinals
1	(Germany) Alexander Zverev	7^{7}	4	5
5	(United States) Taylor Fritz	6^{4}	6	7
WC	(Germany) Daniel Altmaier	1	3
(United States) Frances Tiafoe	6	6

Final
5	(United States) Taylor Fritz	4	4
(United States) Frances Tiafoe	6	6

=== Top half ===
First round
1	(Germany) A Zverev	6	4	6
(Czech Republic) V Kopřiva	3	6	2
(Brazil) J Fonseca	2	2
(Germany) Y Hanfmann	6	6
(Australia) A Popyrin	4	2
Q	(Belgium) R Collignon	6	6
Q	(Italy) M Bellucci	7^{8}	6
7	(Kazakhstan) A Bublik	6^{6}	1
3	(United States) B Shelton	7	6
LL	(Italy) L Sonego	5	3
K Khachanov	6	4	4
(United States) E Quinn	1	6	6
(Hungary) F Marozsán	6	3	6
(Serbia) M Kecmanović	3	6	4
(Belgium) Z Bergs	6^{4}	7	4
5	(United States) T Fritz	7^{7}	5	6

Second round
1	(Germany) A Zverev	6	7^{7}
(Germany) Y Hanfmann	3	6^{4}
Q	(Belgium) R Collignon	4	6	6
Q	(Italy) M Bellucci	6	4	3
3	(United States) B Shelton	6	5	6
(United States) E Quinn	4	7	4
(Hungary) F Marozsán	2	4
5	(United States) T Fritz	6	6

Quarterfinals
1	(Germany) A Zverev	7^{12}	7^{7}
Q	(Belgium) R Collignon	6^{10}	6^{2}
3	(United States) B Shelton	7^{7}	6^{8}	6^{3}
5	(United States) T Fritz	6^{5}	7^{10}	7^{7}

Semifinals
1	(Germany) A Zverev	7^{7}	4	5
5	(United States) T Fritz	6^{4}	6	7

=== Bottom half ===
First round
8	A Rublev	3	2
PR	(Poland) H Hurkacz	6	6
Q	(Georgia (country)) N Basilashvili	5	4
WC	(Germany) D Altmaier	7	6
(France) T Atmane	6	3	7^{7}
Q	(Spain) M Landaluce	3	6	6^{2}
(Argentina) TM Etcheverry	3	4
4	D Medvedev	6	6
6	(Italy) F Cobolli	2	6^{4}
(United States) F Tiafoe	6	7^{7}
(Netherlands) T Griekspoor	4	6	4
SE	(Japan) S Shimabukuro	6	3	6
WC	(Germany) M Schönhaus	2	4
(United States) L Tien	6	6
(Portugal) N Borges	3	6	3
2	(Canada) F Auger-Aliassime	6	3	6

Second round
PR	(Poland) H Hurkacz	6	3	5
WC	(Germany) D Altmaier	3	6	7
(France) T Atmane	4	4
4	D Medvedev	6	6
(United States) F Tiafoe	6	7
SE	(Japan) S Shimabukuro	4	5
(United States) L Tien	7^{7}	5	6^{5}
2	(Canada) F Auger-Aliassime	6^{5}	7	7^{7}

Quarterfinals
WC	(Germany) D Altmaier	6	6^{6}	6
4	D Medvedev	4	7^{8}	4
(United States) F Tiafoe	3	6	7^{14}
2	(Canada) F Auger-Aliassime	6	3	6^{12}

Semifinals
WC	(Germany) D Altmaier	1	3
(United States) F Tiafoe	6	6

== Qualifying ==
=== Seeds ===
1. (Belgium) Raphaël Collignon (qualified)
2. (Spain) Martín Landaluce (qualified)
3. (Italy) Lorenzo Sonego (qualifying competition, lucky loser)
4. (Italy) Mattia Bellucci (qualified)
5. (Spain) Roberto Bautista Agut (qualifying competition)
6. (Georgia (country)) Nikoloz Basilashvili (qualified)
7. (Australia) Alex Bolt (qualifying competition)
8. (Germany) Tom Gentzsch (qualifying competition)

=== Qualifiers ===
1. (Belgium) Raphaël Collignon
2. (Spain) Martín Landaluce
3. (Georgia (country)) Nikoloz Basilashvili
4. (Italy) Mattia Bellucci

=== Lucky loser ===
1. (Italy) Lorenzo Sonego

=== First qualifier ===
First round
1	(Belgium) Raphaël Collignon	6	6
PR	(Tunisia) Aziz Dougaz	4	2
WC	(Germany) Benito Sanchez Martinez	5	2
5	(Spain) Roberto Bautista Agut	7	6

Qualifying competition
1	(Belgium) Raphaël Collignon	6	6
5	(Spain) Roberto Bautista Agut	2	4

=== Second qualifier ===
First round
2	(Spain) Martín Landaluce	3	6	7^{10}
Alt	(Switzerland) Marc-Andrea Hüsler	6	3	6^{8}
(Portugal) Tiago Pereira	5	6^{5}
8	(Germany) Tom Gentzsch	7	7^{7}

Qualifying competition
2	(Spain) Martín Landaluce	7	6
8	(Germany) Tom Gentzsch	5	4

=== Third qualifier ===
First round
3	(Italy) Lorenzo Sonego	7	6
(Romania) Filip Cristian Jianu	5	3
WC	(Germany) Diego Dedura	6^{6}	3
6	(Georgia (country)) Nikoloz Basilashvili	7^{8}	6

Qualifying competition
3	(Italy) Lorenzo Sonego	4	4
6	(Georgia (country)) Nikoloz Basilashvili	6	6

=== Fourth qualifier ===
First round
4	(Italy) Mattia Bellucci	6	6
(Kazakhstan) Mikhail Kukushkin	4	3
WC	(Germany) Jamie Mackenzie	6	1	6^{3}
7	(Australia) Alex Bolt	4	6	7^{7}

Qualifying competition
4	(Italy) Mattia Bellucci	6^{5}	7	6
7	(Australia) Alex Bolt	7^{7}	5	3
