= 2023 Sarasota Open – Singles =

Singles
- 2023 Sarasota Open

Final
- Champion: (Germany) Daniel Altmaier
- Runner-up: (Colombia) Daniel Elahi Galán
- Score: 7–6^{(7–1)}, 6–1

Events
Singles	Doubles
← 2022 ·	Sarasota Open	· 2024 →

Daniel Elahi Galán was the defending champion but lost in the final to Daniel Altmaier.

Altmaier won the title after defeating Galán 7–6^{(7–1)}, 6–1 in the final.

== Seeds ==
1. (Australia) Jason Kubler (quarterfinals)
2. (China) Zhang Zhizhen (second round)
3. (Colombia) Daniel Elahi Galán (final)
4. (Ecuador) Emilio Gómez (first round)
5. (Germany) Daniel Altmaier (champion)
6. (Bolivia) Hugo Dellien (withdrew)
7. (Argentina) Juan Manuel Cerúndolo (first round)
8. (Netherlands) Gijs Brouwer (first round)

== Draw ==
=== Key ===
- Q = Qualifier
- WC = Wild card
- LL = Lucky loser
- Alt = Alternate
- SE = Special exempt
- PR = Protected ranking
- ITF = ITF entry
- JE = Junior exempt
- w/o = Walkover
- r = Retired
- d = Defaulted
- SR = Special ranking

=== Finals ===
Semifinals
(Czech Republic) Tomáš Macháč	4	1
3	(Colombia) Daniel Elahi Galán	6	6
5	(Germany) Daniel Altmaier	6	6
(France) Enzo Couacaud	2	2

Final
3	(Colombia) Daniel Elahi Galán	6^{1}	1
5	(Germany) Daniel Altmaier	7^{7}	6

=== Top half ===
First round
1	(Australia) J Kubler	6	6
(Chinese Taipei) T-l Wu	4	3
Alt	(South Korea) S-c Hong	6	6
LL	(United States) Z Svajda	0	0
WC	(United States) T Kodat	6	1	7
(Japan) R Noguchi	3	6	5
(Czech Republic) T Macháč	6	6
8	(Netherlands) G Brouwer	3	2
3	(Colombia) DE Galán	6	6
(China) J Shang	3	2
Q	(United States) T Boyer	3	6	7^{7}
(United States) J Sock	6	4	6^{3}
Q	(Brazil) M Alves	4	6^{6}
(Argentina) C Ugo Carabelli	6	7^{8}
(Australia) A Vukic	6	6
Q	(Kazakhstan) D Popko	1	1

Second round
1	(Australia) J Kubler	6	6
Alt	(South Korea) S-c Hong	3	4
WC	(United States) T Kodat	4	6	1
(Czech Republic) T Macháč	6	1	6
3	(Colombia) DE Galán	6	3
Q	(United States) T Boyer	4	0^{r}
(Argentina) C Ugo Carabelli	6^{6}	0
(Australia) A Vukic	7^{8}	6

Quarterfinals
1	(Australia) J Kubler	4	2
(Czech Republic) T Macháč	6	6
3	(Colombia) DE Galán	6	7^{7}
(Australia) A Vukic	2	6^{3}

Semifinals
(Czech Republic) T Macháč	4	1
3	(Colombia) DE Galán	6	6

=== Bottom half ===
First round
5	(Germany) D Altmaier	6^{5}	6	7
Q	(United States) M Damm	7^{7}	3	5
(Belgium) Z Bergs	6	7
Q	(Italy) Luca Potenza	3	5
(Argentina) F Díaz Acosta	6	2	6^{5}
Alt	(Canada) G Diallo	3	6	7^{7}
Alt	(United States) M Krueger	7	6
4	(Ecuador) E Gómez	5	3
7	(Argentina) JM Cerúndolo	4	5
WC	(United States) B Fratangelo	6	7
Alt	(Argentina) GA Olivieri	6	4	7
WC	(United States) C Harrison	4	6	5
(United States) D Kudla	1^{r}
(France) E Couacaud	5
Q	(United States) A Rybakov	4	6^{1}
2	(China) Zh Zhang	6	7^{7}

Second round
5	(Germany) D Altmaier	7	6
(Belgium) Z Bergs	5	4
Alt	(Canada) G Diallo	6	6
Alt	(United States) M Krueger	2	4
WC	(United States) B Fratangelo	6	3	6^{0}
Alt	(Argentina) GA Olivieri	3	6	7^{7}
(France) E Couacaud	6	6
2	(China) Zh Zhang	3	3

Quarterfinals
5	(Germany) D Altmaier	5
Alt	(Canada) G Diallo	2^{r}
Alt	(Argentina) GA Olivieri	2	6	6^{6}
(France) E Couacaud	6	1	7^{8}

Semifinals
5	(Germany) D Altmaier	6	6
(France) E Couacaud	2	2
