= 2026 Halle Open =

- Date: 15–21 June
- Edition: 33rd
- Category: ATP Tour 500
- Draw: 32S / 16D
- Surface: Grass
- Location: Halle, Germany
- Venue: Heristo Arena

Champions

Singles
- (United States) Frances Tiafoe

Doubles
- (France) Théo Arribagé / (France) Albano Olivetti
- Halle Open

The 2026 Halle Open (known for sponsorship reasons as the Terra Wortmann Open) was a men's tennis tournament played on outdoor grass courts. It was the 33rd edition of the Halle Open and part of the ATP 500 series of the 2026 ATP Tour. It took place at the Heristo Arena in Halle, North Rhine-Westphalia, Germany, between 15 June and 21 June 2026.

== Finals ==
=== Singles ===
- (United States) Frances Tiafoe def. (United States) Taylor Fritz, 6–4, 6–4

=== Doubles ===
- (France) Théo Arribagé / (France) Albano Olivetti vs. (Germany) Daniel Altmaier / (Brazil) João Fonseca, 7–6^{(7–2)}, 6–4

== Singles main draw entrants ==
=== Seeds ===
Country	Player	Rank^{1}	Seed
GER	Alexander Zverev	3	1
CAN	Félix Auger-Aliassime	4	2
USA	Ben Shelton	5	3
	Daniil Medvedev	8	4
USA	Taylor Fritz	9	5
ITA	Flavio Cobolli	10	6
KAZ	Alexander Bublik	11	7
	Andrey Rublev	13	8

- Rankings are as of 8 June 2026

=== Other entrants ===
The following players received wildcards into the main draw:

- (Germany) Daniel Altmaier
- ~~(Australia) Nick Kyrgios~~
- (Germany) Max Schönhaus

The following player received entry using a protected ranking:

- (Poland) Hubert Hurkacz

The following player received entry as a special exempt:

- (Japan) Sho Shimabukuro

The following players received entry from the qualifying draw:

- (Georgia (country)) Nikoloz Basilashvili
- (Italy) Mattia Bellucci
- (Belgium) Raphaël Collignon
- (Spain) Martín Landaluce

The following player received entry as a lucky loser:

- (Italy) Lorenzo Sonego

=== Withdrawals ===
- (France) Arthur Fils → replaced by (France) Térence Atmane
- (United States) Sebastian Korda → replaced by (Australia) Alexei Popyrin
- (Australia) Nick Kyrgios → replaced by (Italy) Lorenzo Sonego
- (Czech Republic) Tomáš Macháč → replaced by (Hungary) Fábián Marozsán
- (United States) Alex Michelsen → replaced by (Germany) Yannick Hanfmann

== Doubles main draw entrants ==
=== Seeds ===
Country	Player	Country	Player	Rank^{1}	Seed
GER	Kevin Krawietz	GER	Tim Pütz	21	1
POR	Francisco Cabral	AUT	Lucas Miedler	43	2
CZE	Adam Pavlásek	ITA	Andrea Vavassori	55	3
USA	Robert Cash	USA	JJ Tracy	58	4

- ^{1} Rankings are as of 8 June 2026.

=== Other entrants ===
The following pairs received wildcards into the doubles main draw:

- ~~(Italy) Mattia Bellucci / (Australia) Nick Kyrgios~~
- (Germany) Yannick Hanfmann / (Germany) Jan-Lennard Struff

The following pair received entry from the qualifying draw:

- (United States) Robert Galloway / (Australia) John Peers

The following pair received entry as lucky losers:

- (Germany) Daniel Altmaier / (Brazil) João Fonseca

=== Withdrawals ===
- (Italy) Mattia Bellucci / (Australia) Nick Kyrgios → replaced by (Germany) Daniel Altmaier / (Brazil) João Fonseca
