= 2016 Zhuhai ITF Women's Pro Circuit – Singles =

Singles
- 2016 Zhuhai ITF Women's Pro Circuit

Final
- Champion: (Belarus) Olga Govortsova
- Runner-up: (Turkey) İpek Soylu
- Score: 6–1, 6–2

Events
Singles	Doubles
← 2015 ·	Zhuhai ITF Women's Pro Circuit	· 2017 →

Chang Kai-chen was the defending champion, but lost to Nigina Abduraimova in the quarterfinals.

Olga Govortsova won the title, defeating İpek Soylu in the final, 6–1, 6–2.

== Seeds ==
1. (Russia) Elizaveta Kulichkova (second round)
2. (Germany) Tatjana Maria (quarterfinals)
3. (China) Liu Fangzhou (first round)
4. (Uzbekistan) Nigina Abduraimova (semifinals)
5. (Turkey) İpek Soylu (final)
6. (Russia) Anastasia Pivovarova (first round, retired)
7. (Chinese Taipei) Chang Kai-chen (quarterfinals)
8. (Chinese Taipei) Lee Ya-hsuan (second round)

== Main draw ==
=== Key ===
- Q = Qualifier
- WC = Wild card
- LL = Lucky loser
- Alt = Alternate
- SE = Special exempt
- PR = Protected ranking
- ITF = ITF entry
- JE = Junior exempt
- w/o = Walkover
- r = Retired
- d = Defaulted
- SR = Special ranking

=== Finals ===
Semifinals
(China) Lu Jiajing	2	6	3
(Belarus) Olga Govortsova	6	4	6
4	(Uzbekistan) Nigina Abduraimova	3	2
5	(Turkey) İpek Soylu	6	6

Final
(Belarus) Olga Govortsova	6	6
5	(Turkey) İpek Soylu	1	2

=== Top half ===
First round
1	(Russia) E Kulichkova	7	6
WC	(China) S Cao	5	0
(China) J Lu	6	3	6
WC	(China) Y Zhang	1	6	4
(China) R Tian	3	2
(Thailand) N Lertpitaksinchai	6	6
(Italy) C Ferrando	2	7	5
8	(Chinese Taipei) Y-h Lee	6	5	7
3	(China) F Liu	0	2
(Belarus) O Govortsova	6	6
(Japan) K Okamura	3	6	6
Q	(Thailand) N Lertcheewakarn	6	4	2
(China) Jin Lu	2	0^{r}
Q	(Japan) Y Tanaka	6	1
Q	(Belarus) V Lapko	6	2
6	(Russia) A Pivovarova	3	0^{r}

Second round
1	(Russia) E Kulichkova	6	5	1
(China) J Lu	3	7	6
(Thailand) N Lertpitaksinchai	6	7^{7}
8	(Chinese Taipei) Y-h Lee	3	6^{5}
(Belarus) O Govortsova	7	6
(Japan) K Okamura	5	1
Q	(Japan) Y Tanaka	4	5
Q	(Belarus) V Lapko	6	7

Quarterfinals
(China) J Lu	7	2	7^{7}
(Thailand) N Lertpitaksinchai	5	6	6^{5}
(Belarus) O Govortsova	2	6	6
Q	(Belarus) V Lapko	6	2	2

Semifinals
(China) J Lu	2	6	3
(Belarus) O Govortsova	6	4	6

=== Bottom half ===
First round
7	(Chinese Taipei) K-c Chang	6	6
WC	(China) Y Wang	2	0
(Thailand) Pe Plipuech	6	7^{8}
(Georgia (country)) S Shapatava	3	6^{6}
(Poland) K Piter	3	7^{7}	6
Q	(China) X Gao	6	6^{0}	1
(Thailand) K Buayam	0	4
4	(Uzbekistan) N Abduraimova	6	6
5	(Turkey) İ Soylu	6	6
WC	(China) X You	4	1
(India) A Raina	6^{2}	2
(China) S Peng	7^{7}	6
(Chinese Taipei) C-w Hsu	1	4
(Japan) J Namigata	6	6
(Switzerland) J Teichmann	1	3
2	(Germany) T Maria	6	6

Second round
7	(Chinese Taipei) K-c Chang	6	7
(Thailand) Pe Plipuech	3	5
(Poland) K Piter	3	5
4	(Uzbekistan) N Abduraimova	6	7
5	(Turkey) İ Soylu	4	6	6
(China) S Peng	6	4	4
(Japan) J Namigata	6	1	4
2	(Germany) T Maria	1	6	6

Quarterfinals
7	(Chinese Taipei) K-c Chang	7^{9}	4	6^{6}
4	(Uzbekistan) N Abduraimova	6^{7}	6	7^{8}
5	(Turkey) İ Soylu	7^{7}	6
2	(Germany) T Maria	6^{4}	4

Semifinals
4	(Uzbekistan) N Abduraimova	3	2
5	(Turkey) İ Soylu	6	6
