= 2023 Sarasota Open – Doubles =

Doubles
- 2023 Sarasota Open

Final
- Champions: (United Kingdom) Julian Cash (United Kingdom) Henry Patten
- Runners-up: (Argentina) Guido Andreozzi (Argentina) Guillermo Durán
- Score: 7–6^{(7–4)}, 6–4

Events
Singles	Doubles
← 2022 ·	Sarasota Open	· 2024 →

Robert Galloway and Jackson Withrow were the defending champions but only Galloway chose to defend his title, partnering Miguel Ángel Reyes-Varela. Galloway lost in the quarterfinals to Guido Andreozzi and Guillermo Durán.

Julian Cash and Henry Patten won the title after defeating Andreozzi and Durán 7–6^{(7–4)}, 6–4 in the final.

== Seeds ==
1. (United Kingdom) Julian Cash / (United Kingdom) Henry Patten (champions)
2. (Sweden) André Göransson / (Japan) Ben McLachlan (quarterfinals)
3. (United States) Robert Galloway / (Mexico) Miguel Ángel Reyes-Varela (quarterfinals)
4. (India) Yuki Bhambri / (India) Saketh Myneni (quarterfinals)

== Draw ==
=== Key ===
- Q = Qualifier
- WC = Wild card
- LL = Lucky loser
- Alt = Alternate
- SE = Special exempt
- PR = Protected ranking
- ITF = ITF entry
- JE = Junior exempt
- w/o = Walkover
- r = Retired
- d = Defaulted
- SR = Special ranking

First round
1	(United Kingdom) J Cash (United Kingdom) H Patten	6	7
(United States) E King (United States) R Stalder	3	5
(Belgium) Z Bergs (France) E Couacaud	4	4
(France) J Eysseric (Netherlands) D Pel	6	6
4	(India) Y Bhambri (India) S Myneni	3	6	[10]
WC	(United States) M Damm (United States) T Kodat	6	4	[5]
(Australia) J Kubler (Australia) A Vukic	2^{r}
(Jamaica) D Brown (Germany) T Sandkaulen	1
Alt	(South Korea) S-c Hong (Japan) R Noguchi	2	2
(Argentina) G Andreozzi (Argentina) G Durán	6	6
Alt	(Brazil) M Alves (Italy) Luca Potenza	4	2
3	(United States) R Galloway (Mexico) MÁ Reyes-Varela	6	6
(United States) W Blumberg (Venezuela) LD Martínez	6	6^{3}	[10]
(Netherlands) G Brouwer (United States) C Harrison	3	7^{7}	[7]
(Chinese Taipei) T-l Wu (China) Zh Zhang	5	4
2	(Sweden) A Göransson (Japan) B McLachlan	7	6

Quarterfinals
1	(United Kingdom) J Cash (United Kingdom) H Patten	6	6
(France) J Eysseric (Netherlands) D Pel	1	4
4	(India) Y Bhambri (India) S Myneni	2	4
(Jamaica) D Brown (Germany) T Sandkaulen	6	6
(Argentina) G Andreozzi (Argentina) G Durán	7^{7}	5	[10]
3	(United States) R Galloway (Mexico) MÁ Reyes-Varela	6^{4}	7	[6]
(United States) W Blumberg (Venezuela) LD Martínez	7^{7}	7
2	(Sweden) A Göransson (Japan) B McLachlan	6^{5}	5

Semifinals
1	(United Kingdom) J Cash (United Kingdom) H Patten	6	7^{8}
(Jamaica) D Brown (Germany) T Sandkaulen	3	6^{6}
(Argentina) G Andreozzi (Argentina) G Durán	6	6
(United States) W Blumberg (Venezuela) LD Martínez	3	3

Final
1	(United Kingdom) J Cash (United Kingdom) H Patten	7^{7}	6
(Argentina) G Andreozzi (Argentina) G Durán	6^{4}	4
