= 2023 Sarasota Open =

- Date: 10–16 April
- Edition: 13th
- Prize money: $160,000
- Surface: Clay (Green)
- Location: Sarasota, Florida, United States

Champions

Singles
- (Germany) Daniel Altmaier

Doubles
- (United Kingdom) Julian Cash / (United Kingdom) Henry Patten
- Sarasota Open

The 2023 Sarasota Open was a professional tennis tournament played on clay courts. It was the 13th edition of the tournament which was part of the 2023 ATP Challenger Tour. It took place in Sarasota, Florida, United States, between April 10 and April 16, 2023.

== Singles main-draw entrants ==
=== Seeds ===
Country	Player	Rank^{1}	Seed
AUS	Jason Kubler	71	1
CHN	Zhang Zhizhen	93	2
COL	Daniel Elahi Galán	94	3
ECU	Emilio Gómez	99	4
GER	Daniel Altmaier	108	5
~~BOL~~	~~Hugo Dellien~~	~~112~~	~~6~~
ARG	Juan Manuel Cerúndolo	119	7
NED	Gijs Brouwer	123	8

- ^{1} Rankings are as of April 3, 2023.

=== Other entrants ===
The following players received wildcards into the singles main draw:

- (United States) Bjorn Fratangelo
- (United States) Christian Harrison
- (United States) Toby Kodat

The following players received entry into the singles main draw as alternates:

- (Canada) Gabriel Diallo
- (South Korea) Hong Seong-chan
- (United States) Mitchell Krueger
- (Argentina) Genaro Alberto Olivieri

The following players received entry from the qualifying draw:

- (Brazil) Mateus Alves
- (United States) Tristan Boyer
- (United States) Martin Damm
- (Kazakhstan) Dmitry Popko
- (Italy) Luca Potenza
- (United States) Alex Rybakov

The following player received entry as a lucky loser:

- (United States) Zachary Svajda

== Champions ==
=== Singles ===
- (Germany) Daniel Altmaier def. (Colombia) Daniel Elahi Galán 7–6^{(7–1)}, 6–1.

=== Doubles ===
- (United Kingdom) Julian Cash / (United Kingdom) Henry Patten def. (Argentina) Guido Andreozzi / (Argentina) Guillermo Durán 7–6^{(7–4)}, 6–4.
