= Daniel Altmaier =

German tennis player (born 1998)

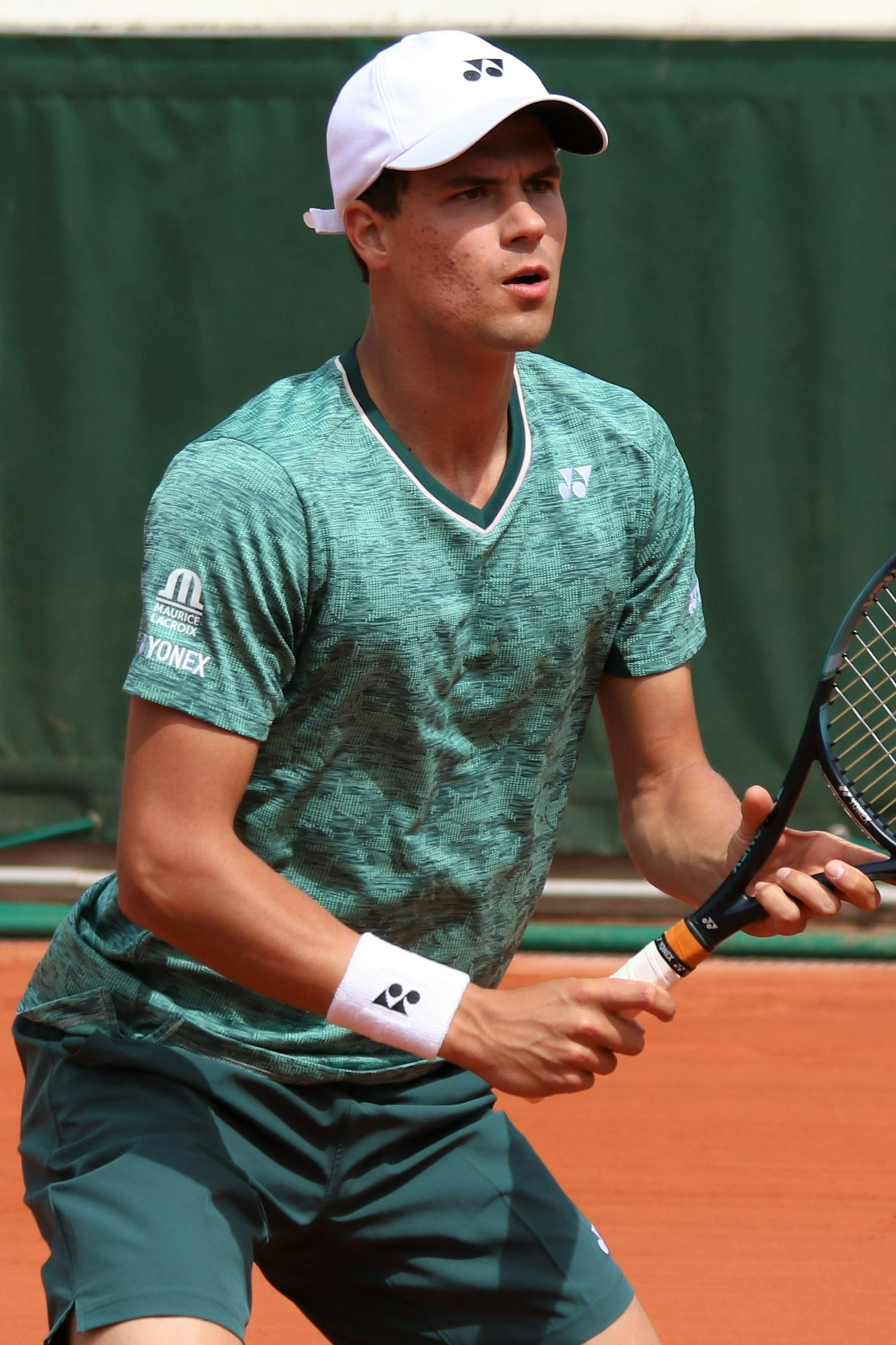
- Altmaier at the 2022 French Open
- Country (sports): Germany
- Residence: Kempen, Germany; Mexico
- Born: 12 September 1998 (age 28) Kempen, Germany
- Height: 1.88 m (6 ft 2 in)
- Turned pro: August 2014
- Plays: Right-handed (one-handed backhand)
- Coach: Martin Cuevas
- Prize money: US $6,035,853

Singles
- Career record: 82–137
- Career titles: 0
- Highest ranking: No. 44 (5 January 2026)
- Current ranking: No. 73 (9 November 2026)

Grand Slam singles results
- Australian Open: 2R (2025)
- French Open: 4R (2020, 2025)
- Wimbledon: 2R (2024)
- US Open: 3R (2025)

Doubles
- Career record: 9–25
- Career titles: 0
- Highest ranking: No. 196 (19 October 2026)
- Current ranking: No. 196 (19 October 2026)

Grand Slam doubles results
- Australian Open: 2R (2022, 2024)
- French Open: 1R (2022)
- Wimbledon: 1R (2022, 2023)
- US Open: 1R (2022)

Team competitions
- Davis Cup: SF (2024)
- Last updated on: 9 November 2026.

Daniel Altmaier (German pronunciation: [ˈdaːni̯eːl ˈʔaltmaɪɐ, -ni̯ɛl -]; born 12 September 1998) is a German professional tennis player. He has a career-high ATP singles ranking of world No. 44 achieved on 5 January 2026 and a doubles ranking of No. 196 achieved on 19 October 2026. He is the No. 4 German singles player.

== Personal life ==
Altmaier's father Jurij is Ukrainian and his mother Galina is Russian. He speaks German, English, Russian, and Spanish, the last he claims he learned through his Mexican girlfriend.

== Career ==
=== 2017: ATP Tour debut ===
Altmaier made his ATP main draw debut as a qualifier at the 2017 Geneva Open, defeating Alexander Ward and Petr Michnev in qualifying. He lost to Sam Querrey in the first round.

He won his first ATP tour-level match as a lucky loser at the 2017 Antalya Open when he beat Víctor Estrella Burgos. In the next round, he defeated wildcard Marsel İlhan to reach the quarterfinals, where he lost to Yūichi Sugita. Both of his victories were decided by a third set tiebreak.

=== 2020: Major debut and first top-10 win ===
Shoulder and hip injuries held back Altmaier's progress in his tennis career, but victories in qualifying over Tallon Griekspoor and Ruben Bemelmans led to his Grand Slam debut at the 2020 French Open, where he defeated Feliciano López, 30th seed Jan-Lennard Struff and 7th seed Matteo Berrettini, all of them in straight sets. In the fourth round, he lost to Pablo Carreño Busta.

=== 2021: Two ATP Tour semifinals, top 100 ===
In October, Altmaier recorded his first win at a Masters 1000 level on his debut at the 2021 BNP Paribas Open defeating Sam Querrey.

Altmaier made his debut in the top 100 on 15 November 2021 at World No. 98 following the final at the 2021 Knoxville Challenger. He followed this by winning his third Challenger title for the year at the 2021 Puerto Vallarta Open.

=== 2022: Australian, Wimbledon, Top 60 debuts ===
He made his major debut at the 2022 Australian Open and 2022 Wimbledon Championships.

At the 2022 US Open also on his debut, he took Jannik Sinner to five sets in his first round match.

=== 2023: First Masters quarterfinal, top 50 ===
In April, Altmaier claimed his seventh Challenger title at the 2023 Sarasota Open defeating defending champion Daniel Elahi Galán. He entered the 2023 Mutua Madrid Open as a lucky loser replacing 18th seed Pablo Carreño Busta directly into the second round, for only his second time at this round at a Masters 1000 level. He defeated compatriots Oscar Otte and Yannick Hanfmann to reach the fourth round for the first time in his career at the Masters level. He reached the quarterfinals for the first time defeating Jaume Munar in straight sets and moved 30 positions back up in the top 65 in the rankings. He lost to Borna Ćorić in straight sets. He continued his good form at the 2023 French Open where he reached again the third round, defeating eight seed Jannik Sinner in five sets in 5 hours and 26 minutes, the longest match since Lorenzo Giustino against Corentin Moutet six hours, 5 minutes win in 2020, the fifth longest overall of the tournament and the second longest of the season after Kokkinakis against Murray at the Australian Open.

He qualified for the 2023 Halle Open as a lucky loser but had to withdraw last minute due to hip injury.

At the 2023 US Open, he won his first main draw match at this major defeating Constant Lestienne. As a result he reached the top 50 in the singles rankings on 11 September 2024. At the 2023 Paris Masters, he reached the third round after a walkover from Taylor Fritz who was injured.

=== 2026: First ATP final and Top 200 in doubles ===
At the 2026 Halle Open Altmaier reached his first ATP final, partnering João Fonseca, where they were defeated by Théo Arribagé and Albano Olivetti 7–6^{(7–2)}, 6–4. At the same tournament having been awarded a wildcard for a second year in a row, he reached his first ATP 500 semifinal in singles, taking his revenge, for prior year loss at the event, on fourth seed and world No. 7 Daniil Medvedev, his eight top 10 win.

== Performance timelines ==
Key
W	F	SF	QF	#R	RR	Q#	DNQ	A	NH

(W) winner; (F) finalist; (SF) semifinalist; (QF) quarterfinalist; (#R) rounds 4, 3, 2, 1; (RR) round-robin stage; (Q#) qualification round; (DNQ) did not qualify; (A) absent; (NH) not held; (SR) strike rate (events won / competed); (W–L) win–loss record.
To avoid confusion and double counting, these charts are updated at the conclusion of a tournament or when the player's participation has ended.

=== Singles ===
Current through the 2026 Paris Masters.

Tournament	2017	2018	2019	2020	2021	2022	2023	2024	2025	2026	SR	W–L	Win %
Grand Slam tournaments
Australian Open	A	A	A	A	A	1R	1R	1R	2R	1R	0 / 5	1–5	17%
French Open	A	A	A	4R	A	1R	3R	2R	4R	1R	0 / 6	9–6	60%
Wimbledon	A	A	A	NH	Q2	1R	1R	2R	1R	1R	0 / 5	1–5	17%
US Open	A	A	A	A	A	1R	2R	1R	3R	1R	0 / 5	3–5	38%
Win–loss	0–0	0–0	0–0	3–1	0–0	0–4	3–4	2–4	6–4	0–4	0 / 21	14–21	40%
National representation
Davis Cup	A	A	A	A	A	A	G1	SF	A	Q2	0 / 0	2–3	40%
ATP 1000 tournaments
Indian Wells Open	A	A	A	NH	2R	1R	A	1R	Q1	1R	0 / 4	1–4	20%
Miami Open	A	A	A	NH	Q1	1R	1R	2R	1R	1R	0 / 5	1–5	17%
Monte-Carlo Masters	A	A	A	NH	A	A	A	1R	3R	1R	0 / 3	2–3	40%
Madrid Open	A	A	A	NH	A	A	QF	3R	1R	1R	0 / 4	5–4	56%
Italian Open	A	A	A	A	A	A	2R	1R	1R	2R	0 / 4	2–4	33%
Canadian Open	A	A	A	NH	A	Q2	A	Q1	1R	2R	0 / 2	1–2	33%
Cincinnati Open	A	A	A	A	A	Q1	1R	Q1	1R	2R	0 / 3	1–3	25%
Shanghai Masters	A	A	A	NH			1R	A	2R	2R	0 / 3	2–3	40%
Paris Masters	A	A	A	A	A	A	3R	A	3R	Q1	0 / 2	3–2	60%
Win–loss	0–0	0–0	0–0	0–0	1–1	0–2	5–6	3–5	5–8	4–8	0 / 30	18–30	38%
Career statistics
	2017	2018	2019	2020	2021	2022	2023	2024	2025	2026	Career		
Tournaments	3	0	1	3	8	21	22	22	28	28	Career total: 136		
Hard win–loss	0–0	0–0	0–0	0–2	1–1	2–11	3–13	8–11	15–18	7–14	0 / 67	36–70	34%
Clay win–loss	0–2	0–0	0–1	3–1	6–6	1–6	11–8	4–11	6–7	8–11	0 / 53	39–53	42%
Grass win–loss	2–1	0–0	0–0	0–0	0–1	2–4	0–2	1–1	1–3	4–4	0 / 16	10–16	38%
Overall win–loss	2–3	0–0	0–1	3–3	7–8	5–21	14–23	13–23	22–28	19–29	0 / 136	85–139	38%
Year-end ranking	275	370	279	130	84	94	56	89	46				

=== Doubles ===
Current through the 2026 Halle Open.

Tournament	2017	2018	2019	2020	2021	2022	2023	2024	2025	2026	SR	W–L
Grand Slam tournaments
Australian Open	A	A	A	A	A	2R	1R	2R	A	A	0 / 3	2–3
French Open	A	A	A	A	A	1R	A	A	A	A	0 / 1	0–1
Wimbledon	A	A	A	NH	A	1R	1R	A	A	A	0 / 2	0–2
US Open	A	A	A	A	A	1R	A	A	A	A	0 / 1	0–1
Win–loss	0–0	0–0	0–0	0–0	0–0	1–4	0–2	1–1	0–0	0–0	0 / 7	2–7
Career statistics
Tournaments	1	0	2	1	2	11	3	3	1	2	26	
Titles	0	0	0	0	0	0	0	0	0	0	0	
Finals	0	0	0	0	0	0	0	0	0	1	1	
Overall win–loss	0–1	0–0	0–2	0–1	1–2	2–11	1–2	1–3	0–1	4–2	9–25	
Year-end ranking	697	–	627	596	406	329	880	568	–		26%	

== ATP Tour finals ==
=== Doubles: 1 (runner-up) ===
Legend Grand Slam (–) ATP 1000 (–) ATP 500 (0–1) ATP 250 (–)	Finals by surface Hard (–) Clay (–) Grass (0–1)	Finals by setting Outdoor (0–1) Indoor (–)

Result	W–L	Date	Tournament	Tier	Surface	Partner	Opponents	Score
Loss	0–1	Jun 2026	Halle Open, Germany	ATP 500	Grass	(Brazil) João Fonseca	(France) Théo Arribagé (France) Albano Olivetti	6–7^{(2–7)}, 4–6

== ATP Challenger Tour finals ==
=== Singles: 13 (7 titles, 6 runner-ups) ===
Finals by surface
Hard (1–3)
Clay (6–2)

Result	W–L	Date	Tournament	Surface	Opponent	Score
Loss	0–1	Jan 2018	Burnie International, Australia	Hard	(France) Stéphane Robert	1–6, 2–6
Win	1–1	Jul 2021	Sparkassen Open, Germany	Clay	(Switzerland) Henri Laaksonen	6–1, 6–2
Win	2–1	Aug 2021	Platzmann-Sauerland Open, Germany	Clay	(Chile) Nicolás Jarry	7–6^{(7–1)}, 4–6, 6–3
Loss	2–2	Nov 2021	Knoxville Challenger, US	Hard (i)	(United States) Christopher Eubanks	3–6, 4–6
Win	3–2	Nov 2021	Puerto Vallarta Open, Mexico	Hard	(Chile) Alejandro Tabilo	6–3, 3–6, 6–3
Loss	3–3	Mar 2022	Arizona Tennis Classic, US	Hard	(United States) Denis Kudla	6–2, 2–6, 3–6
Win	4–3	May 2022	Heilbronner Neckarcup, Germany	Clay	(Slovakia) Andrej Martin	3–6, 6–1, 6–4
Win	5–3	Oct 2022	Lima Challenger, Peru	Clay	(Argentina) Tomás Martín Etcheverry	6–1, 6–7^{(4–7)}, 6–4
Win	6–3	Nov 2022	Challenger Ciudad de Guayaquil, Ecuador	Clay	(Argentina) Federico Coria	6–2, 6–4
Win	7–3	Apr 2023	Sarasota Open, US	Clay	(Colombia) Daniel Elahi Galán	7–6^{(7–1)}, 6–1
Loss	7–4	Jun 2024	Emilia-Romagna Open, Italy	Clay	(Netherlands) Jesper de Jong	6–7^{(5–7)}, 1–6
Loss	7–5	Sep 2024	Copa Sevilla, Spain	Clay	(Spain) Roberto Carballés Baena	3–6, 5–7
Loss	7–6	Mar 2026	Napoli Tennis Cup, Italy	Clay	(Serbia) Hamad Medjedovic	2–6, 4–6

== ITF Tour finals ==
=== Singles: 17 (9 titles, 8 runner-ups) ===
Finals by surface
Hard (5–6)
Clay (3–2)
Carpet (1–0)

Result	W–L	Date	Tournament	Surface	Opponent	Score
Loss	0–1	Sep 2015	F26 Santa Margherita di Pula, Italy	Clay	(Italy) Lorenzo Sonego	5–7, 4–6
Win	1–1	Jun 2016	F2 Havré, Belgium	Clay	(Belgium) Maxime Authom	6–2, 6–2
Win	2–1	Jul 2016	F6 Knokke, Belgium	Clay	(Norway) Casper Ruud	6–7^{(3–7)}, 6–1, 7–6^{(7–3)}
Loss	2–2	Oct 2016	F33 Santa Margherita di Pula, Italy	Clay	(Italy) Stefano Travaglia	4–6, 6–2, 1–6
Loss	2–3	Nov 2016	F3 Mishref, Kuwait	Hard	(United Kingdom) Marcus Willis	3–6, 6–7^{(8–10)}
Win	3–3	Dec 2016	F4 Doha, Qatar	Hard	(United Kingdom) Jonny O'Mara	7–5, 6–3
Loss	3–4	Dec 2016	F5 Hua Hin, Thailand	Hard	(South Korea) Kwon Soon-woo	2–6, 2–6
Win	4–4	Feb 2017	F2 Bellevue, Switzerland	Carpet (i)	(Germany) Tim Pütz	7–5, 7–6^{(7–5)}
Win	5–4	Apr 2017	F1 Doha, Qatar	Hard	(France) Antoine Escoffier	6–4, 6–3
Loss	5–5	Apr 2017	F2 Doha, Qatar	Hard	(France) Antoine Escoffier	2–6, 7–6^{(7–2)}, 4–6
Loss	5–6	Oct 2017	F16 Hamburg, Germany	Hard (i)	(Germany) Daniel Masur	3–6, 6–3, 3–6
Loss	5–7	Dec 2017	F4 Hong Kong (China SAR)	Hard	(South Korea) Cheong-Eui Kim	3–6, 6–3, 5–7
Loss	5–8	Mar 2019	M15 Sharm El Sheikh, Egypt	Hard	(Norway) Viktor Durasovic	7–6^{(7–5)}, 4–6, 4–6
Win	6–8	Jun 2019	M15 Kaltenkirchen, Germany	Clay	(Sweden) Christian Lindell	6–1, 6–3
Win	7–8	Nov 2019	M25 Malibu, US	Hard	(United States) Alexander Sarkissian	6–2, 6–4
Win	8–8	Nov 2019	M15 East Lansing, US	Hard (i)	(Belgium) Michael Geerts	4–6, 6–3, 6–0
Win	9–8	Dec 2019	M15 Santo Domingo, Dominican Republic	Hard	(United Kingdom) Jan Choinski	6–3, 4–6, 6–4

=== Doubles: 11 (6 titles, 5 runner-ups) ===
Finals by surface
Hard (3–3)
Clay (2–2)
Carpet (1–0)

Result	W–L	Date	Tournament	Surface	Partner	Opponents	Score
Win	1–0	Feb 2015	ITF Colombo, Sri Lanka	Clay	(Germany) Tom Schönenberg	(Spain) José Checa Calvo (Portugal) Rui Machado	6–7^{(6–8)}, 6–3, [11–9]
Loss	1–1	May 2015	ITF Jablonec, Czech Republic	Clay	(Germany) Paul Wörner	(Poland) Mateusz Kowalczyk (Poland) Adam Majchrowicz	3–6, 5–7
Win	2–1	Sep 2016	ITF Damme, Belgium	Clay	(Germany) Marvin Netuschil	(Germany) Oscar Otte (Germany) Tom Schönenberg	6–2, 6–0
Win	3–1	Oct 2016	ITF Pula, Italy	Clay	(Germany) Marvin Netuschil	(Italy) Claudio Fortuna (Italy) Omar Giacalone	6–2, 6–0
Win	4–1	Nov 2016	ITF Mishref, Kuwait	Hard	(Sweden) Fred Simonsson	(Uzbekistan) Sanjar Fayziev (Uzbekistan) Shonigmatjon Shofayziyev	7–6^{(7–3)}, 6–2
Loss	4–2	Nov 2016	ITF Mishref, Kuwait	Hard	(Sweden) Fred Simonsson	(Venezuela) Jordi Muñoz Abreu (Spain) David Pérez Sanz	4–6, 4–6
Win	5–2	Nov 2016	ITF Mishref, Kuwait	Hard	(United Kingdom) Marcus Willis	(Netherlands) Roy de Valk (France) Ronan Joncour	6–1, 6–1
Win	6–2	Feb 2017	ITF Bellevue, Switzerland	Carpet (i)	(Germany) Marvin Netuschil	(Austria) Maximilian Neuchrist (Netherlands) David Pel	7–5, 1–6, [11–9]
Loss	6–3	Apr 2017	ITF Doha, Qatar	Hard	(Austria) Lucas Miedler	(Sweden) Markus Eriksson (Sweden) Milos Sekulic	5–7, 6–3, [7–10]
Loss	6–4	Mar 2019	ITF Sharm El Sheikh, Egypt	Hard	(Switzerland) Adrian Bodmer	(Italy) Enrico Dalla Valle (Italy) Francesco Forti	6–4, 1–6, [7–10]
Loss	6–5	Oct 2019	ITF Bad Salzdetfurth, Germany	Clay (i)	(United Kingdom) Jan Choinski	(Germany) Lasse Muscheites (Germany) Stefan Seifert	6–2, 3–6, [9–11]

== Wins over top 10 players ==
- Altmaier has a 8–13 record against players who were, at the time the match was played, ranked in the top 10.

Season	2020	2021	2022	2023	2024	2025	2026	Total
Wins	1	0	0	2	1	2	2	8

#	Opponent	Rk	Event	Surface	Rd	Score	Rk
2020
1.	(Italy) Matteo Berrettini	8	French Open, France	Clay	3R	6–2, 7–6^{(7–5)}, 6–4	186
2023
2.	(Italy) Jannik Sinner	9	French Open, France	Clay	2R	6–7^{(0–7)}, 7–6^{(9–7)}, 1–6, 7–6^{(7–4)}, 7–5	79
3.	Andrey Rublev	7	Hamburg Open, Germany	Clay	2R	6–2, 6–2	61
2024
4.	(Germany) Alexander Zverev	6	Mexican Open, Mexico	Hard	1R	6–3, 3–6, 6–3	57
2025
5.	(United States) Taylor Fritz	4	French Open, France	Clay	1R	7–5, 3–6, 6–3, 6–1	66
6.	(Norway) Casper Ruud	9	Paris Masters, France	Hard (i)	2R	6–3, 7–5	50
2026
7.	(United States) Ben Shelton	6	Hamburg Open, Germany	Clay	2R	4–6, 7–6^{(7–4)}, 6–4	65
8.	Daniil Medvedev	7	Halle Open, Germany	Grass	QF	6–4, 6–7^{(6–8)}, 6–4	81
