= Hengqin International Tennis Center =

Tennis stadium complex

Coordinates: 22°07′43″N 113°31′48″E

- 横琴国际网球中心
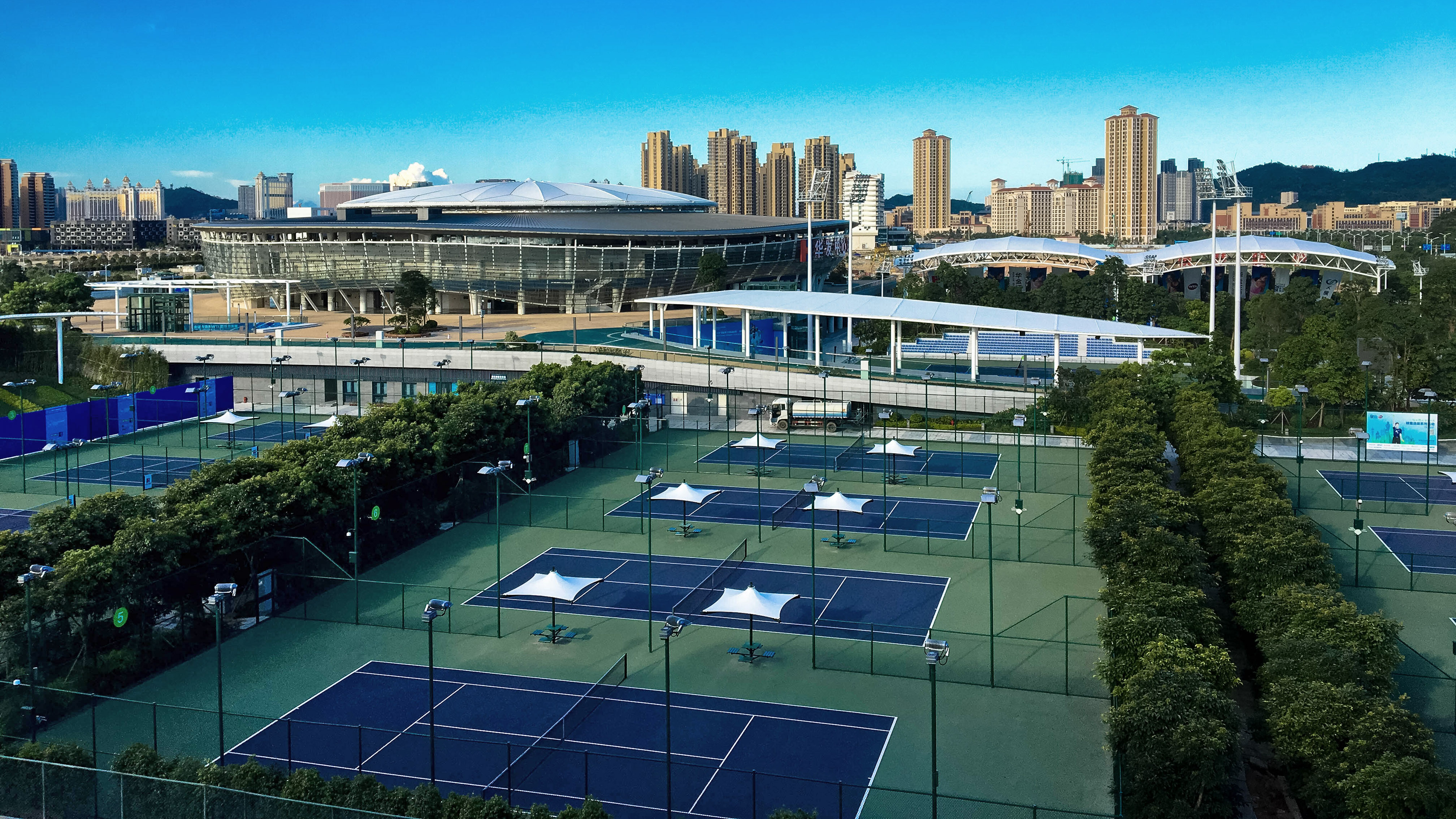
- Interactive map of Hengqin International Tennis Center
- Location: Hengqin, Zhuhai, Guangdong, China
- Owner: Huafa Group
- Capacity: 5,000 (center court); 1,500 (Court 1)
- Surface: Plexicushion (tennis)
- Record attendance: 45600 (2017)

Construction
- Groundbreaking: 2014
- Built: 2014
- Opened: September 2015
- Main contractor: Populous

Tenants
- WTA Elite Trophy; Zhuhai Championships; Zhuhai Open; Zhuhai ITF Women's Pro Circuit; Zhuhai Challenger

Website
- Venue Website

Hengqin International Tennis Center
- Simplified Chinese: 横琴国际网球中心
- Traditional Chinese: 橫琴國際網球中心
Transcriptions
Standard Mandarin
- Hanyu Pinyin: Héngqín Guójì Wǎngqiú Zhōngxīn
Yue: Cantonese
- Jyutping: waang4 kam4 gwok3 zai3 mong5 kau4 zung1 sam1

Hengqin International Tennis Center (Chinese: 横琴国际网球中心) is a tennis stadium complex in the central section of Hengqin island in Zhuhai. It is operated by Huafa Sports, part of the Zhuhai Huafa Group. From 2015 to 2023 it hosted three international competitions: the WTA Elite Trophy, the Zhuhai Open and the Asia-Pacific Wildcard Playoff for the Australian Open.

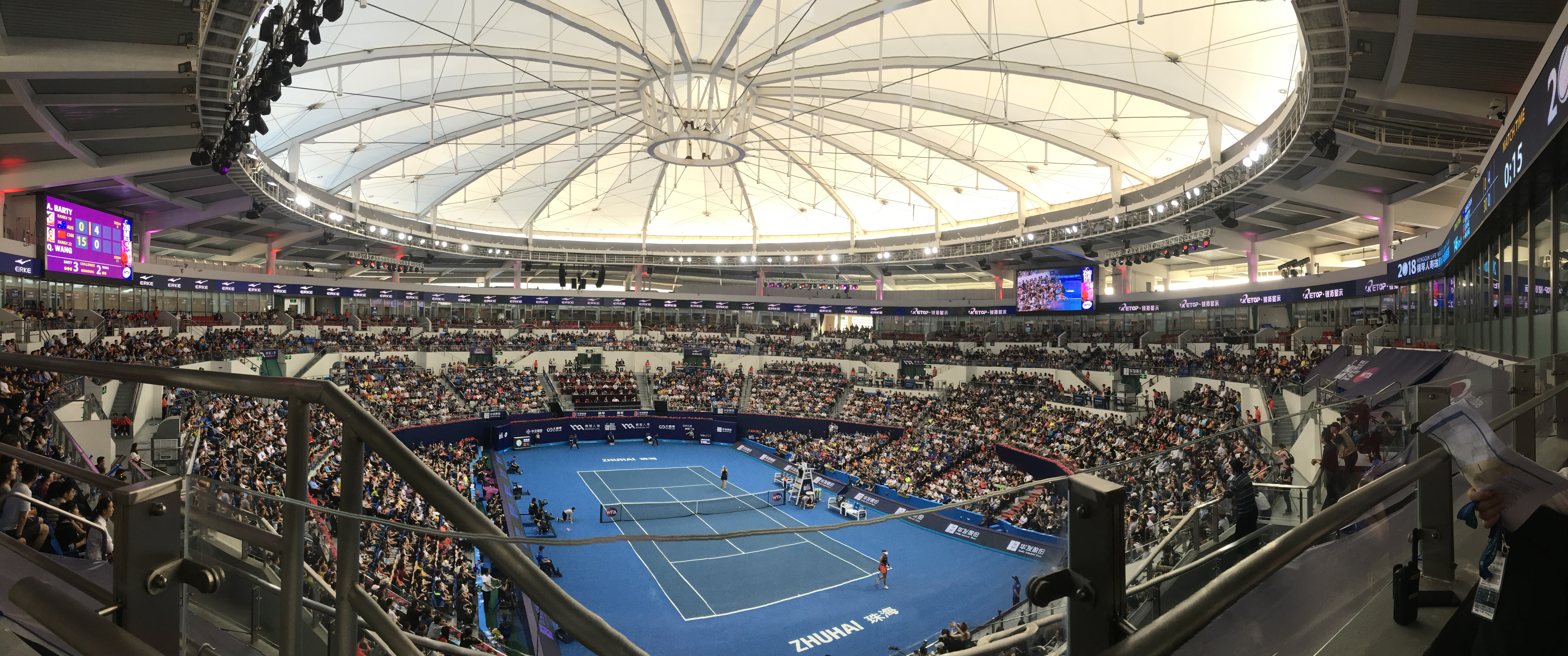
Huafa Center Court

The center covers a floor area of approximately 117,000 square meters. Its first phase, which was completed in 2015, is 68,000 square meters in area. It consists of a center court with a capacity for 5,000 spectators, one court accommodating 1,500 people, four smaller match courts, and twelve practice courts. It was purpose built for the WTA Elite Trophy, which was inaugurated in 2015. It was designed by the sporting architectural company Populous, which was also behind the Wimbledon Centre Court and the Margaret Court Arena in Melbourne Park. The first phase was begun only a year before the center opened, and involved draining and reclamation of the site before construction could begin. Because the WTA Elite Trophy is classified as an outdoor competition, the specifications included a requirement that all courts, indoor and outdoor, have the same climatic conditions in terms of temperature and humidity. Populous achieved this by designing a covered center court with two roofs: a cantilevered outer roof covering the stands, and a central roof covering the court, which allows natural light and ventilation while protecting players and spectators from direct sunlight and rain. The grounds were landscaped as a park, which is open to the public while tournaments are not taking place. The center opened in September 2015, two months before the 2015 WTA Elite Trophy, and hosted the $50,000 Zhuhai ITF Women's Pro Circuit, which subsequently combined with a men's tournament to become the Zhuhai Open. The Women's Tennis Association website reported that "players and fans loved the new stadium, which offered excellent vantage points from every seat."

Between August and December 2018, the Hengqin Tennis Center offered the use of its training facilities for free to all residents of Zhuhai, Macau and Hong Kong.

== See also ==
- List of tennis venues
- List of tennis stadiums by capacity
