= Emily Webley-Smith =

British professional tennis player (born 1984)

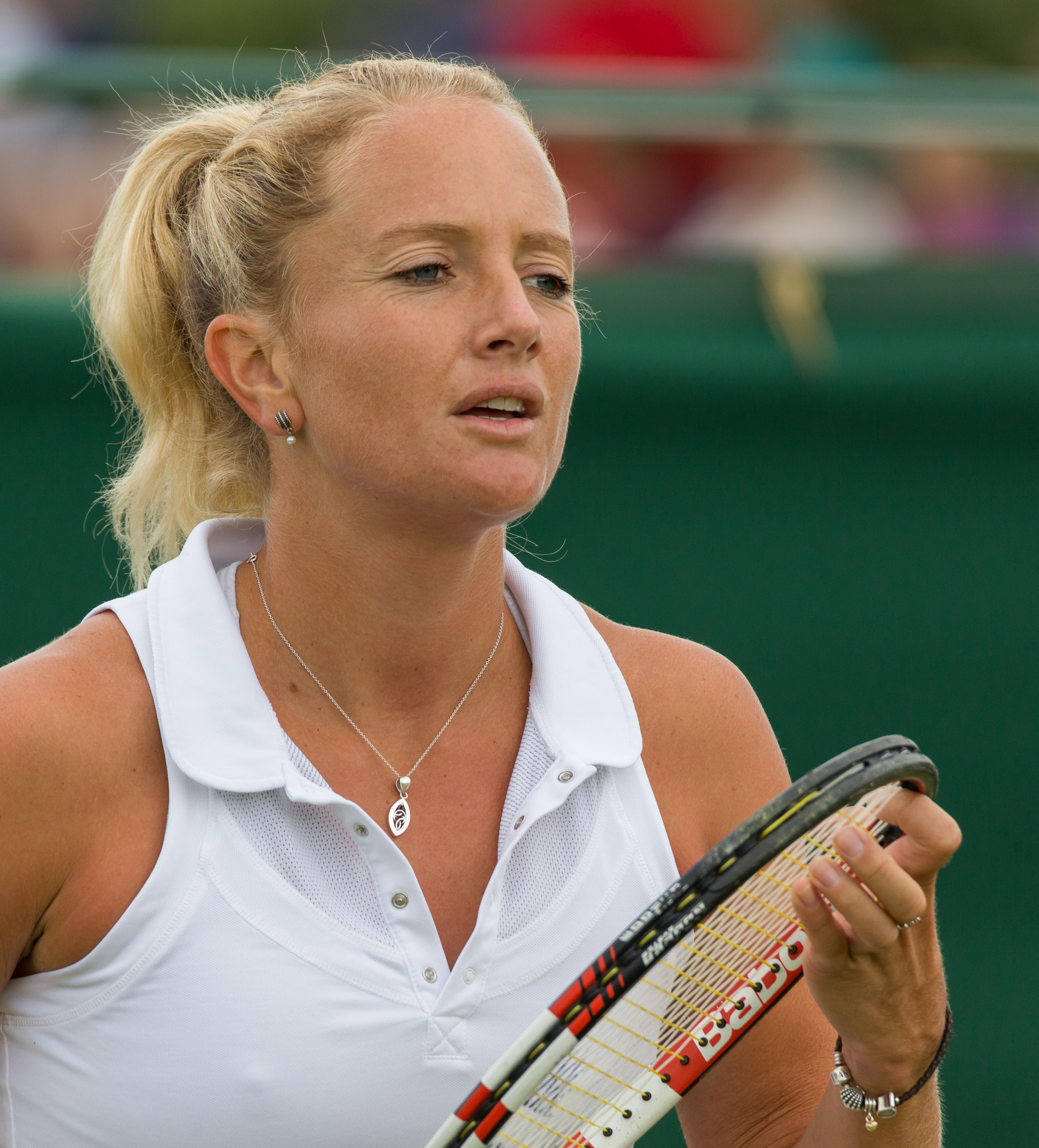
- Webley-Smith at the 2015 Wimbledon qualifying
- Country (sports): United Kingdom
- Residence: Bristol, England
- Born: 14 July 1984 (age 42) Bristol
- Height: 1.68 m (5 ft 6 in)
- Turned pro: 1999
- Plays: Right (two-handed backhand)
- Coach: Jeremy Bates
- Prize money: $483,121

Singles
- Career record: 448–535
- Career titles: 4 ITF
- Highest ranking: No. 240 (7 November 2011)
- Current ranking: No. 1399 (10 August 2026)

Grand Slam singles results
- Wimbledon: 2R (2004)

Doubles
- Career record: 463–503
- Career titles: 27 ITF
- Highest ranking: No. 113 (2 November 2015)
- Current ranking: No. 158 (10 August 2026)

Grand Slam doubles results
- French Open: 1R (2020)
- Wimbledon: 1R (2004, 2005, 2007, 2011, 2015, 2021)

Grand Slam mixed doubles results
- Wimbledon: 2R (2021)
- Last updated on: 19 August 2026.

Emily Webley-Smith (born 14 July 1984) is a British professional tennis player.

She has a career-high WTA singles ranking of No. 240, achieved on 7 November 2011. She also has a best WTA doubles ranking of No. 113, set on 2 November 2015. Webley-Smith has won four singles and twenty-seven doubles titles on the ITF Women's Circuit. She has also reached the second round of her home Grand Slam event, Wimbledon, on one occasion in 2004.

== Personal life ==
Emily Webley-Smith was born in 1984 in Thornbury, Avon, which is now in South Gloucestershire. Her mother, Jane, is a PE teacher and her father, Mike, an amateur footballer and cricketer. She also has a sister named Hannah. Her first introduction to tennis was playing swingball in her garden and in the cricket grounds where her father was the club captain.

Webley-Smith plays right-handed with a two-handed backhand. Her favourite surface is grass.

In her spare time of late, she plays on the touchtennis tour against amateurs and other professional tennis players for fun. Her highest ranking was No. 2 in 2011. Webley-Smith also has her own column in the magazine tennishead in which she often covers the financial aspects of being a mid- to low ranked tour player.

== Injury problems ==
Problems with Webley-Smith's right ankle began in 2002 when she broke it whilst on court competing in the qualifying tournament for the $25k ITF Circuit event in Cardiff and underwent surgery to repair both the bone and the damage caused to the ligaments. She was unable to compete on the tour for six months.

In November 2003, she needed a second operation on her ankle to remove cartilage which had come loose; an operation which was successful and enabled Emily to play injury-free tennis for almost two years.

However, she had to take yet more time out later in 2005 when she began experiencing sharp pains in the same ankle while warming up for an ITF tournament in Puebla, Mexico. She had treatment on the ankle again and returned, with limited success, to competitive tennis in spring 2006 before having surgery for a third time to remove fluid from her ankle.

She began recovering well before septicaemia left her unable to walk for five weeks. Webley-Smith said of the time, "My ankle was the size of a football. I remember the doctor trying to take my sock off and I was screaming. I was taking what they call an 'elephant dose' of antibiotics and the strongest painkillers they could give me". She returned full-time to the circuit in August 2006.

In 2009, she also began to have trouble with her wrist after injuring it during an ITF event in Tanjung Selor in Indonesia, just a number of weeks before Wimbledon. It recovered well enough in time for Webley-Smith to compete in the Wimbledon qualifying rounds however she reaggravated the injury later in the year and was unable to compete again until February 2010.

== Career ==
=== 1998–2002: Junior career ===
Webley-Smith played her first junior ITF tournament in February 1998 and her last in July 2002. Over her junior career in singles, she reached a total of four quarterfinals, two semifinals and the final of the "Slazenger Appletise Winchester Junior Tournament". She competed at Wimbledon juniors a total of four times; in 1999, 2000 and 2001 she lost in the qualifying stages but in 2002 she reached the second round of the main draw. Her career-high singles ranking was world No. 119 (reached on 29 April 2002) and her win–loss record was 31–31.

In doubles, she won three tournaments, was a runner-up in another and also reached one semifinal and seven quarterfinals. Her doubles win–loss record was 22–27 and her career-high ranking was world No. 95, achieved on 30 July 2001.

=== 1999–2002 ===
Webley-Smith played her first match on the ITF Women's Circuit in October 1999, a match which she lost 0–6, 0–6 against Melanie Schnell from Austria. It was her only professional match in 1999.

In 2000, she played a total of six tournaments. She lost in the qualifying rounds of four 10k events in Great Britain (Bournemouth, Frinton, Hatfield and Sunderland), lost in the first round of another (in Glasgow) and was also beaten in the first round of the 25k event in Felixstowe by fellow Brit Jane O'Donoghue, 6–4, 6–3.

The 2001 season began for Webley-Smith with qualifying and reaching the quarterfinals of the $10k event in Jersey, before being beaten by Anne Keothavong, 6–3, 7–6. But for the rest of the year, she lost in the qualifying stages in every other tournament she entered with the exception of the Sunderland event where she was defeated again by Keothavong, 6–3, 6–4. She also played in the main draw of her final ITF tournament of the year as a lucky loser but was again beaten in round one. She ended the year ranked 712.

Webley-Smith had a varied year in 2002, with limited success on the ITF Circuit but also her first appearance in a Grand Slam tournament at Wimbledon where she lost in the first round of qualifying to Nina Dübbers, 1–6, 2–6. She only reached one quarterfinal in 2002, at the 10k London event in August. In October, Emily broke her ankle during a qualifying match for a 25k event in Cardiff and did not compete again that season. Nevertheless, her year-end ranking rose to No. 673.

=== 2003 ===
Webley-Smith played her first professional match since breaking her ankle in 2002 in April at the qualifying event for the 10k in Bournemouth where she lost in the second round. In May, she reached two consecutive quarterfinals in Spain: Monzón and Almeira. In June, for the first time in her career, she was given a wildcard into the Birmingham Classic qualifying draw, a Tier-III tournament; she was beaten by Bethanie Mattek in straight sets, 6–3, 6–4. She then received another wildcard into Wimbledon qualifying and again lost her first round match, 2–6, 1–6, to Sada Noorlander. Two more consecutive quarterfinal appearances in ITF tournaments immediately followed this, Waco, Texas (10k) and Vancouver (25k), and one more in August in a 10k event in London. She ended the year with a singles ranking of 469.

=== 2004 ===
2004 started slowly for Webley-Smith; she won only two of her first ten matches on the ITF Circuit. However, in March she reached the quarterfinals in Patras, before losing to Ekaterina Dzehalevich, 2–6, 0–6. In this same tournament, she reached the doubles final partnering compatriot, Chantal Coombs, and lost to Martina Müller and Vladimíra Uhlířová, in two sets. Two months later, she reached two more ITF quarterfinals consecutively in Mérida, Yucatán and Surbiton. In June, she was given wildcards into the qualifying draws for the Birmingham Classic and the Tier II Eastbourne International, where she lost in the first and second rounds of qualifying, respectively.

This was immediately followed by another wildcard, this one into the main draw of Wimbledon. In her first ever main-draw Grand Slam tournament appearance, she managed to survive rain delays and defeat Frenchwoman Séverine Beltrame, in straight sets, to reach the second round where she faced 31st seed Amy Frazier. The final result did not go Webley-Smith's way though as she was defeated with a final score of 6–2, 3–6, 8–6. She spent the rest of the year on the ITF Circuit but did not progress past the second round in any tournament she played. Her year-end ranking for 2004 was 272.

=== 2005 ===
Webley-Smith began the 2005 season well on home ground by reaching the semifinals of the 10k tournament in Tipton where she had to retire during her semifinal match against fellow Briton, Katie O'Brien. She continued competing on the ITF Circuit for the first half of the year and reached the quarterfinal stages in two more 10k tournaments, in Tampico, Tamaulipas and Ho Chi Minh City. In June, she was given a wildcard into the qualifying draw for the Tier III Birmingham Classic where she lost in the first round of the qualifying event. This was followed by a wildcard into the qualifying draw of Wimbledon where she was also beaten in the first round, by Meilen Tu, 7–5, 6–3. She reached only one more ITF semifinal that year, in the 25k event in Lagos where she lost to Anne Keothavong, in straight sets. Her year-end ranking for 2005 was 385.

=== 2006 ===
She spent much of the 2006 season out of action due to suffering from septicaemia as a result of her long-term ankle problems which began in 2002. She was forced to retire in only her second match of the year in February and was unable to compete again until August when she reached the semifinals of an ITF tournament in London and the quarterfinals a tournament in Istanbul. She was beaten by compatriot Naomi Cavaday in either the first or second round in three out of four consecutive $25k tournaments in September, October and November that year. As a result of her injury problems, Webley-Smith's final ranking of the year fell to No. 713.

=== 2007 ===
She spent the first three months competing in lower ITF tournaments. In April, Webley-Smith was a semifinalist in Obregón in Mexico and in May she reached two quarterfinals in Mazatlán and Irapuato, both also in Mexico. She was awarded a wildcard into the qualifying draw of Wimbledon where she lost in the first round to Jenifer Widjaja. She reached only one more quarterfinal that year, in Wrexham. Her year-end ranking was No. 595.

=== 2008 ===
The circuit started slowly for Webley-Smith as she began the season with four consecutive losses. However, in July she reached the quarterfinals of an ITF event in Atlanta and then immediately went on to reach two consecutive finals in Evansville, Indiana and Saint Joseph, Missouri. In late September and early October, she reached two more 25k quarterfinals and just a few weeks later she reached two consecutive ITF semifinals: in Port Pirie (25k) where she was beaten by Melanie South, and in Muzaffarnagar where she lost to Sanaa Bhambri, 0–6, 0–6. She reached the quarterfinals of the 50k event in Kolkata in November and finished the season ranked world No. 475.

=== 2009 ===
In February 2009, Webley-Smith returned to the ITF Circuit and in March she won the first singles title of her career in Spain by beating Elena Chalova in the final, 6–0, 7–6. She then headed to Indonesia for a series of three tournaments but in the third of these she injured her wrist and was forced to retire in round one. Returning to the tour in mid-June, Webley-Smith was given a wildcard into the qualifying tournament at Eastbourne where she lost 0–6, 6–7 to María José Martínez Sánchez. A second consecutive wildcard allowed her entry into qualifying for Wimbledon but she lost in the first round to Gréta Arn. In August, she reached two ITF tournament finals, winning the first to give her the second title in her career and losing the other. Webley-Smith spent the rest of the season competing in Australia and reached two 25k quarterfinals, before reinjuring her wrist in November. Her year-end ranking was 332.

=== 2011 ===
Webley-Smith made her first 50k singles final in Gifu, Japan, where she finished runner-up to Sachie Ishizu.

=== 2025 ===
Aged 41, and 26 years after making her professional debut, Webley-Smith reached her first WTA Tour doubles final at the Jiangxi Open. Teaming with Ekaterina Ovcharenko, they lost to Quinn Gleason and Elena Pridankina in a deciding champions tiebreak.

== WTA Tour finals ==
=== Doubles: 1 (runner-up) ===
Legend WTA 250 (0–1)	Finals by surface Hard (0–1)

Result	Date	Tournament	Tier	Surface	Partner	Opponents	Score
Loss	Nov 2025	Jiangxi Open, China	WTA 250	Hard	Ekaterina Ovcharenko	(United States) Quinn Gleason; Elena Pridankina	4–6, 6–2, [6–10]

== ITF Circuit finals ==
=== Singles: 12 (4 titles, 8 runner-ups) ===
Legend $50,000 tournaments $10/15,000 tournaments	Finals by surface Hard (4–8)

Result	W–L	Date	Tournament	Tier	Surface	Opponent	Score
Loss	0–1	Jul 2008	ITF Evansville, United States	10,000	Hard	(United States) Megan Moulton-Levy	3–6, 4–6
Loss	0–2	Jul 2008	ITF St Joseph, United States	10,000	Hard	(United States) Amanda McDowell	1–6, 0–6
Win	1–2	Mar 2009	ITF Las Palmas, Spain	10,000	Hard	(Russia) Elena Chalova	6–0, 7–6^{(5)}
Win	2–2	Aug 2009	ITF New Delhi, India	10,000	Hard	(Uzbekistan) Alexandra Kolesnichenko	6–1, 6–1
Loss	2–3	Aug 2009	ITF New Delhi, India	10,000	Hard	(India) Poojashree Venkatesha	6–7^{(8)}, 2–6
Loss	2–4	Apr 2011	Kangaroo Cup Gifu, Japan	50,000	Hard	(Japan) Sachie Ishizu	1–6, 3–6
Loss	2–5	Dec 2013	ITF Sharm El Sheikh, Egypt	10,000	Hard	(Belarus) Iryna Shymanovich	4–6, 3–6
Loss	2–6	Feb 2014	ITF Sharm El Sheikh, Egypt	10,000	Hard	(Netherlands) Demi Schuurs	4–6, 2–6
Win	3–6	Mar 2014	ITF Sharm El Sheikh, Egypt	10,000	Hard	(Russia) Eugeniya Pashkova	7–6^{(7)}, 0–6, 6–4
Loss	3–7	Feb 2017	ITF Sharm El Sheikh, Egypt	15,000	Hard	(Germany) Sarah-Rebecca Sekulic	2–6, 4–6
Win	4–7	Feb 2017	ITF Sharm El Sheikh, Egypt	15,000	Hard	(Bulgaria) Julia Terziyska	6–3, 6–4
Loss	4–8	Mar 2018	ITF Bhopal, India	15,000	Hard	(Slovakia) Tereza Mihalíková	1–6, 7–5, 0–6

=== Doubles: 60 (27 titles, 33 runner-ups) ===
Legend $100,000 tournaments $75/80,000 tournaments $50/60,000 tournaments $40,000 tournaments $25,000 tournaments $10/15,000 tournaments	Finals by surface Hard (22–24) Clay (0–3) Grass (1–2) Carpet (4–4)

Result	W–L	Date	Tournament	Tier	Surface	Partner	Opponents	Score
Loss	0–1	Mar 2004	ITF Patras, Greece	10,000	Hard	(United Kingdom) Chantal Coombs	(Germany) Martina Müller (Czech Republic) Vladimíra Uhlířová	6–7^{(7)}, 3–6
Win	1–1	Oct 2004	ITF Bolton, UK	10,000	Hard (i)	(United Kingdom) Sarah Borwell	(United Kingdom) Hannah Collin (United Kingdom) Anna Hawkins	7–5, 1–6, 6–2
Loss	1–2	Aug 2005	ITF Bucharest, Romania	10,000	Clay	(Romania) Antonia Xenia Tout	(Romania) Corina-Claudia Corduneanu (Romania) Lenore Lăzăroiu	1–6, 2–6
Loss	1–3	Sep 2006	ITF London, UK	10,000	Hard	(United Kingdom) Laura Peterzan	(United Kingdom) Jane O'Donoghue (United Kingdom) Karen Paterson	3–6, 3–6
Win	2–3	Aug 2006	ITF Istanbul, Turkey	10,000	Hard	(Germany) Ria Dörnemann	(Ukraine) Irina Khatsko (Ukraine) Mariya Malkhasyan	w/o
Win	3–3	Sep 2006	ITF Nottingham, UK	10,000	Hard	(United Kingdom) Georgie Gent	(United Kingdom) Naomi Cavaday (United Kingdom) Claire Peterzan	3–6, 7–5, 6–4
Loss	3–4	Mar 2007	ITF Sunderland, UK	10,000	Hard (i)	(Germany) Ria Dörnemann	(United Kingdom) Anna Hawkins (United Kingdom) Jane O'Donoghue	4–6, 7–6^{(5)}, 3–6
Loss	3–5	May 2007	ITF Los Mochis, Spain	10,000	Hard	(United Kingdom) Danielle Brown	(Brazil) Maria Fernanda Alves (United States) Jennifer Elie	3–6, 0–6
Win	4–5	Aug 2008	ITF London, UK	10,000	Hard	(United States) Megan Moulton-Levy	(Slovakia) Martina Babáková (Georgia (country)) Manana Shapakidze	6–1, 6–1
Loss	4–6	Dec 2008	ITF Delhi, India	50,000	Hard	(United States) Megan Moulton-Levy	(Chinese Taipei) Hwang I-hsuan (Hong Kong) Zhang Ling	3–6, 6–7^{(4)}
Loss	4–7	Apr 2009	ITF Balikpapan, Indonesia	25,000	Hard	(Hong Kong) Zhang Ling	(Indonesia) Yayuk Basuki (Indonesia) Romana Tedjakusuma	3–6, 3–6
Win	5–7	Aug 2009	ITF Delhi, India	10,000	Hard	(Uzbekistan) Alexandra Kolesnichenko	(India) Ashmitha Easwaramurthi (Slovenia) Dalila Jakupovič	6–2, 6–4
Win	6–7	Oct 2009	ITF Mount Gambier, Australia	25,000	Hard	(Australia) Olivia Rogowska	(Japan) Erika Sema (Japan) Yurika Sema	6–1, 5–7, [10–7]
Loss	6–8	Jul 2010	ITF Almaty, Kazakhstan	25,000	Hard	(Ukraine) Yuliya Beygelzimer	(Uzbekistan) Albina Khabibulina (Kyrgyzstan) Ksenia Palkina	4–6, 4–6
Win	7–8	Sep 2010	ITF Madrid, Spain	10,000	Hard	(United Kingdom) Naomi Broady	(United Kingdom) Jennifer Ren (Russia) Marta Sirotkina	6–2, 6–3
Win	8–8	Mar 2012	GB Pro-Series Bath, UK	10,000	Hard (i)	(United Kingdom) Samantha Murray	(Slovakia) Lenka Juríková (Poland) Katarzyna Piter	4–6, 6–4, [10–5]
Loss	8–9	Mar 2012	ITF Fallanden, Switzerland	10,000	Carpet (i)	(Switzerland) Lara Michel	(Switzerland) Xenia Knoll (Switzerland) Amra Sadiković	7–6^{(7)}, 4–6, [10–12]
Loss	8–10	May 2012	ITF Karuizawa, Japan	25,000	Grass	(United Kingdom) Samantha Murray	(Chinese Taipei) Hsieh Shu-ying (Japan) Kumiko Iijima	6–3, 6–7^{(6)}, [1–10]
Win	9–10	Feb 2013	Launceston International, Australia	25,000	Hard	(Russia) Ksenia Lykina	(United States) Allie Kiick (Canada) Erin Routliffe	7–5, 6–3
Loss	9–11	Feb 2013	ITF Mildura, Australia	25,000	Grass	(Australia) Bojana Bobusic	(Russia) Ksenia Lykina (Japan) Yurika Sema	4–6, 2–6
Loss	9–12	Jul 2013	Challenger de Granby, Canada	25,000	Hard	(France) Julie Coin	(United States) Lena Litvak (Canada) Carol Zhao	5–7, 4–6
Loss	9–13	Aug 2013	ITF Landisville, US	25,000	Hard	(South Africa) Chanel Simmonds	(Australia) Monique Adamczak (Australia) Olivia Rogowska	2–6, 3–6
Win	10–13	Oct 2013	Lagos Open, Nigeria	25,000	Hard	(United Kingdom) Naomi Broady	(Oman) Fatma Al-Nabhani (Romania) Cristina Dinu	3–6, 6–4, [10–7]
Win	11–13	Nov 2013	ITF Mumbai, India	15,000	Hard	(United States) Anamika Bhargava	(Chinese Taipei) Hsu Ching-wen (United Kingdom) Eden Silva	6–4, 7–5
Win	12–13	Mar 2014	ITF Sharm El Sheikh, Egypt	10,000	Hard	(United Kingdom) Eden Silva	(Czech Republic) Nikola Horáková (Japan) Akari Inoue	6–7^{(4)}, 6–4, [10–5]
Loss	12–14	Mar 2014	ITF Sharm El Sheikh	10,000	Hard	(Finland) Emma Laine	(Russia) Eugeniya Pashkova (Montenegro) Ana Veselinović	3–6, 5–7
Loss	12–15	Mar 2014	ITF Sharm El Sheikh	10,000	Hard	(United Kingdom) Laura Deigman	(Russia) Eugeniya Pashkova (India) Prarthana Thombare	2–6, 4–6
Win	13–15	Apr 2014	ITF Dakar, Senegal	15,000	Hard	(South Africa) Chanel Simmonds	(Switzerland) Conny Perrin (Russia) Ekaterina Yashina	6–4, 7–5
Win	14–15	Dec 2014	ITF Lucknow, India	15,000	Grass	(India) Ankita Raina	(India) Rushmi Chakravarthi (India) Nidhi Chilumula	6–2, 6–4
Win	15–15	Feb 2015	Midland Tennis Classic, US	100,000	Hard (i)	(France) Julie Coin	(United States) Jacqueline Cako (United States) Sachia Vickery	4–6, 7–6, [11–9]
Loss	15–16	Mar 2015	ITF Bangkok, Thailand	15,000	Hard	(South Africa) Chanel Simmonds	(South Korea) Jang Su-jeong (Serbia) Vojislava Lukić	4–6, 4–6
Loss	15–17	Apr 2015	Kangaroo Cup Gifu, Japan	75,000	Hard	(Belgium) An-Sophie Mestach	(China) Wang Yafan (China) Xu Yifan	2–6, 3–6
Win	16–17	Jul 2015	Lexington Challenger, US	50,000	Hard	(Japan) Nao Hibino	(Thailand) Nicha Lertpitaksinchai (Thailand) Peangtarn Plipuech	6–2, 6–2
Loss	16–18	Oct 2015	Zhuhai Open, China	50,000	Hard	(Russia) Irina Khromacheva	(China) Xu Shilin (China) You Xiaodi	6–3, 2–6, [4–10]
Loss	16–19	Apr 2016	ITF Nanning, China	25,000	Hard	(Russia) Ksenia Lykina	(China) Liu Chang (Thailand) Varatchaya Wongteanchai	1–6, 4–6
Win	17–19	Sep 2016	Zhuhai Open, China	50,000	Hard	(India) Ankita Raina	(China) Guo Hanyu (China) Jiang Xinyu	6–4, 6–4
Win	18–19	May 2017	ITF Hua Hin, Thailand	25,000	Hard	(India) Ankita Raina	(Thailand) Nudnida Luangnam (China) Zhang Yukun	6–2, 6–0
Loss	18–20	Jul 2017	ITF Gatineau, Canada	25,000	Hard	(Australia) Kimberly Birrell	(Japan) Hiroko Kuwata (Russia) Valeria Savinykh	6–4, 3–6, [5–10]
Loss	18–21	Aug 2017	ITF Landisville, US	25,000	Hard	(Russia) Ksenia Lykina	(United States) Sophie Chang (United States) Alexandra Mueller	6–4, 3–6, [5–10]
Win	19–21	Feb 2018	ITF Sharm El Sheikh, Egypt	15,000	Hard	(Poland) Katarzyna Kawa	(Romania) Laura Ioana Andrei (Belgium) Hélène Scholsen	6–3, 3–6, [10–5]
Win	20–21	Feb 2018	ITF Sharm El Sheikh	15,000	Hard	(Russia) Anastasia Pribylova	(Romania) Laura Ioana Andrei (Germany) Julia Kimmelmann	6–3, 6–3
Loss	20–22	March 2018	ITF Manama, Bahrain	15,000	Hard	(Zimbabwe) Valeria Bhunu	(Oman) Fatma Al-Nabhani (Philippines) Marian Capadocia	5–7, 2–6
Loss	20–23	May 2018	Kangaroo Cup Gifu, Japan	80,000	Hard	(Russia) Ksenia Lykina	(Japan) Rika Fujiwara (Japan) Yuki Naito	5–7, 4–6
Loss	20–24	Apr 2019	ITF Óbidos, Portugal	W25	Carpet	(Georgia (country)) Sofia Shapatava	(Spain) Cristina Bucșa (Spain) Georgina García Pérez	5–7, 5–7
Win	21–24	Apr 2019	ITF Óbidos, Portugal	W25	Carpet	(Georgia (country)) Sofia Shapatava	(Georgia (country)) Mariam Bolkvadze (Slovenia) Nastja Kolar	6–1, 2–6, [11–9]
Win	22–24	May 2019	ITF Óbidos, Portugal	W25	Carpet	(Georgia (country)) Sofia Shapatava	(Italy) Martina Colmegna (Colombia) María Herazo González	6–3, 6–0
Win	23–24	May 2019	ITF Óbidos, Portugal	W25	Carpet	(Georgia (country)) Sofia Shapatava	(Italy) Martina Colmegna (Spain) Nuria Párrizas Díaz	6–4, 6–1
Win	24–24	May 2019	ITF Santa Margarita, Spain	W25	Hard	(Georgia (country)) Sofia Shapatava	(Bulgaria) Elitsa Kostova (United Kingdom) Samantha Murray	6–4, 7–5
Loss	24–25	Nov 2019	Shenzhen Longhua Open, China	W100	Hard	(Georgia (country)) Sofia Shapatava	(Japan) Nao Hibino (Japan) Makoto Ninomiya	4–6, 0–6
Win	25–25	Nov 2019	ITF Bhopal, India	W25	Hard	(India) Rutuja Bhosale	(Latvia) Diāna Marcinkēviča (Ukraine) Valeriya Strakhova	6–4, 7–5
Win	26–25	Mar 2021	ITF Pune, India	W25	Hard	(India) Rutuja Bhosale	(India) Riya Bhatia (Romania) Miriam Bulgaru	6–2, 7–5
Loss	26–26	Jan 2022	GB Pro-Series Bath, UK	W25	Hard (i)	(Romania) Arina Gabriela Vasilescu	(Sweden) Caijsa Hennemann (Estonia) Elena Malõgina	4–6, 3–6
Loss	26–27	Jun 2022	ITF Cantanhede, Portugal	W25	Carpet (o)	(Brazil) Ingrid Martins	(Indonesia) Jessy Rompies (Australia) Olivia Tjandramulia	2–6, 6–7^{(1)}
Loss	26–28	Nov 2022	Open Nantes Atlantique, France	W60	Hard (i)	(Slovenia) Veronika Erjavec	(Belgium) Magali Kempen (Chinese Taipei) Wu Fang-hsien	2–6, 4–6
Loss	26–29	May 2023	ITF Otočec, Slovenia	W40	Clay	(Croatia) Mariana Dražić	(Czech Republic) Dominika Šalková (Slovenia) Veronika Erjavec	5–7, 3–6
Loss	26–30	Nov 2023	ITF Solarino, Italy	W25	Carpet	(Georgia (country)) Sofia Shapatava	(Italy) Angelica Moratelli (Italy) Lisa Pigato	3–6, 4–6
Loss	26–31	Sep 2024	ITF Reims, France	W35	Hard (i)	Ekaterina Ovcharenko	(United Kingdom) Sarah Beth Grey (United Kingdom) Mingge Xu	3–6, 1–6
Loss	26–32	Dec 2024	Internazionali Val Gardena, Italy	W35	Hard (i)	Ekaterina Ovcharenko	(Poland) Weronika Falkowska (Sweden) Lisa Zaar	4–6, 6–1, [10–12]
Win	27–32	Feb 2025	ITF Herrenschwanden, Switzerland	W35	Carpet (i)	Ekaterina Ovcharenko	(Georgia (country)) Mariam Bolkvadze (Austria) Sinja Kraus	7–6^{(1)}, 2–6, [11–9]
Loss	27–33	Mar 2025	ITF Antalya, Turkiye	W15	Clay	Ekaterina Ovcharenko	(Poland) Daria Kuczer (Romania) Patricia Maria Țig	4–6, 2–6

== Grand Slam singles performance timeline ==
Key
W	F	SF	QF	#R	RR	Q#	DNQ	A	NH

(W) winner; (F) finalist; (SF) semifinalist; (QF) quarterfinalist; (#R) rounds 4, 3, 2, 1; (RR) round-robin stage; (Q#) qualification round; (DNQ) did not qualify; (A) absent; (NH) not held; (SR) strike rate (events won / competed); (W–L) win–loss record.

Tournament	2002	2003	2004	2005	2006	2007	2008	2009	2010	2011	2012	2013	2014	2015	W–L
Australian Open	A	A	A	A	A	A	A	A	A	A	A	A	A	A	0–0
French Open	A	A	A	A	A	A	A	A	A	A	A	A	A	A	0–0
Wimbledon	Q1	Q1	2R	Q1	A	Q1	A	Q1	Q1	1R	Q1	Q1	Q2	Q1	1–2
US Open	A	A	A	A	A	A	A	A	A	A	A	A	A	A	0–0
