= 2023 Zhuhai Challenger – Doubles =

Doubles
- 2023 Zhuhai Challenger

Final
- Champions: (Switzerland) Luca Castelnuovo (Poland) Filip Peliwo
- Runners-up: (China) Li Hanwen (China) Li Zhe
- Score: 7–5, 7–6^{(7–4)}

Events
Singles	Doubles
← 2019 ·	Zhuhai Challenger	· 2024 →

Gong Maoxin and Zhang Ze were the defending champions but chose not to defend their title.

Luca Castelnuovo and Filip Peliwo won the title after defeating Li Hanwen and Li Zhe 7–5, 7–6^{(7–4)} in the final.

== Seeds ==
1. (Japan) Toshihide Matsui / (Japan) Kaito Uesugi (semifinals)
2. (Northern Mariana Islands) Colin Sinclair / (New Zealand) Rubin Statham (quarterfinals)
3. (New Zealand) Ajeet Rai / (Australia) Luke Saville (first round)
4. (Chinese Taipei) Ray Ho / (China) Sun Fajing (quarterfinals)

== Draw ==
=== Key ===
- Q = Qualifier
- WC = Wild card
- LL = Lucky loser
- Alt = Alternate
- SE = Special exempt
- PR = Protected ranking
- ITF = ITF entry
- JE = Junior exempt
- w/o = Walkover
- r = Retired
- d = Defaulted
- SR = Special ranking

First round
(Latvia) R Strombachs (United States) E Zhu	6	3	[10]
WC	(China) J Cui (China) Wang Xiaofei	4	6	[3]
3	(New Zealand) A Rai (Australia) L Saville	4	7	[8]
(China) H Li (China) Z Li	6	5	[10]
(Australia) Dong Jiayang (China) Dong Zhenxiong	3	1
(Philippines) FC Alcantara (France) A Weber	6	6
(Switzerland) L Castelnuovo (Poland) F Peliwo	6	6
(Greece) M Kalovelonis (Greece) S Sakellaridis	4	4
WC	(China) R Te (China) Y Zhou	6^{3}	6^{2}
4	(Chinese Taipei) R Ho (China) F Sun	7^{7}	7^{7}
Aliaksandr Liaonenka; A Zgirovsky	7^{7}	7^{7}
Mikalai Haliak; E Karlovskiy	6^{5}	6^{1}
(Chinese Taipei) C-p Hsieh (China) Xiao Linang	5	5
2	(Northern Mariana Islands) C Sinclair (New Zealand) R Statham	7	7

Quarterfinals
1	(Japan) T Matsui (Japan) K Uesugi	7^{7}	6
(Latvia) R Strombachs (United States) E Zhu	6^{3}	4
(China) H Li (China) Z Li	6	6
(Philippines) FC Alcantara (France) A Weber	1	2
(Switzerland) L Castelnuovo (Poland) F Peliwo	6	7^{7}
4	(Chinese Taipei) R Ho (China) F Sun	3	6^{4}
A Liaonenka; A Zgirovsky	7^{8}	6
2	(Northern Mariana Islands) C Sinclair (New Zealand) R Statham	6^{6}	3

Semifinals
1	(Japan) T Matsui (Japan) K Uesugi	3	4
(China) H Li (China) Z Li	6	6
(Switzerland) L Castelnuovo (Poland) F Peliwo	7^{8}	6
A Liaonenka; A Zgirovsky	6^{6}	3

Final
(China) H Li (China) Z Li	5	6^{4}
(Switzerland) L Castelnuovo (Poland) F Peliwo	7	7^{7}
