= 2017 Zhuhai Open – Men's doubles =

Men's doubles
- 2017 Zhuhai Open

Final
- Champions: (China) Gong Maoxin (China) Zhang Ze
- Runners-up: (South Africa) Ruan Roelofse (Chinese Taipei) Yi Chu-huan
- Score: 6–3, 7–6^{(7–4)}

Events
Singles	men	women
Doubles	men	women
← 2016 ·	Zhuhai Open	· 2018 →

Gong Maoxin and Yi Chu-huan were the defending champions but chose to participate with different partners. Gong partnered Zhang Ze and successfully defended his title. Yi partnered Ruan Roelofse but lost in the final to Gong and Zhang.

Gong and Zhang won the title after defeating Roelofse and Yi 6–3, 7–6^{(7–4)} in the final.

== Seeds ==
1. (Croatia) Antonio Šančić / (Croatia) Franko Škugor (semifinals)
2. (Czech Republic) Roman Jebavý / (Slovakia) Igor Zelenay (quarterfinals)
3. (China) Gong Maoxin / (China) Zhang Ze (champions)
4. (Chinese Taipei) Peng Hsien-yin / (Thailand) Sanchai Ratiwatana (first round)

== Draw ==
=== Key ===
- Q = Qualifier
- WC = Wild card
- LL = Lucky loser
- Alt = Alternate
- SE = Special exempt
- PR = Protected ranking
- ITF = ITF entry
- JE = Junior exempt
- w/o = Walkover
- r = Retired
- d = Defaulted
- SR = Special ranking

First round
1	(Croatia) A Šančić (Croatia) F Škugor	6	6
WC	(China) S Liu (China) R Te	1	2
(Germany) G Kretschmer (Germany) A Satschko	4	6^{2}
(Belarus) U Ignatik (Italy) S Napolitano	6	7^{7}
4	(Chinese Taipei) H-y Peng (Thailand) Sa Ratiwatana	3	5
(South Africa) R Roelofse (Chinese Taipei) C-h Yi	6	7
(Chinese Taipei) C-p Hsieh (Indonesia) C Rungkat	3	3
(Germany) M Marterer (Czech Republic) J Šátral	6	6
PR	(India) Y Bhambri (India) J Nedunchezhiyan	2	4
WC	(China) D Wu (China) Zh Zhang	6	6
(Serbia) L Đere (Slovenia) B Kavčič	4	2
3	(China) M Gong (China) Ze Zhang	6	6
(Italy) T Fabbiano (Italy) L Vanni	6	6
(Belarus) I Ivashka (South Korea) D-h Lee	2	3
WC	(China) Chen Long (China) Li Jianhui	5	5
2	(Czech Republic) R Jebavý (Slovakia) I Zelenay	7	7

Quarterfinals
1	(Croatia) A Šančić (Croatia) F Škugor	6^{2}	6	[10]
(Belarus) U Ignatik (Italy) S Napolitano	7^{7}	2	[4]
(South Africa) R Roelofse (Chinese Taipei) C-h Yi	4	6	[10]
(Germany) M Marterer (Czech Republic) J Šátral	6	4	[1]
WC	(China) D Wu (China) Zh Zhang	6^{4}	6^{2}
3	(China) M Gong (China) Ze Zhang	7^{7}	7^{7}
(Italy) T Fabbiano (Italy) L Vanni	7^{9}	4	[11]
2	(Czech Republic) R Jebavý (Slovakia) I Zelenay	6^{7}	6	[9]

Semifinals
1	(Croatia) A Šančić (Croatia) F Škugor	3	5
(South Africa) R Roelofse (Chinese Taipei) C-h Yi	6	7
3	(China) M Gong (China) Ze Zhang	4	6	[10]
(Italy) T Fabbiano (Italy) L Vanni	6	3	[5]

Final
(South Africa) R Roelofse (Chinese Taipei) C-h Yi	3	6^{4}
3	(China) M Gong (China) Ze Zhang	6	7^{7}
