= 2016 Zhuhai Challenger – Doubles =

Doubles
- 2016 Zhuhai Challenger

Final
- Champions: (China) Gong Maoxin (Chinese Taipei) Yi Chu-huan
- Runners-up: (Chinese Taipei) Hsieh Cheng-peng (China) Wu Di
- Score: 2–6, 6–1, [10–5]

Events
| Singles | Doubles |
| Zhuhai Challenger | · 2017 → |

This was the first edition of the tournament.

Gong Maoxin and Yi Chu-huan won the title after defeating Hsieh Cheng-peng and Wu Di 2–6, 6–1, [10–5] in the final.

== Seeds ==
1. (Thailand) Sanchai Ratiwatana / (Thailand) Sonchat Ratiwatana (quarterfinals)
2. (Croatia) Dino Marcan / (Croatia) Franko Škugor (first round)
3. (China) Gong Maoxin / (Chinese Taipei) Yi Chu-huan (champions)
4. (China) Bai Yan / (Italy) Riccardo Ghedin (semifinals)

== Draw ==
=== Key ===
- Q = Qualifier
- WC = Wild card
- LL = Lucky loser
- Alt = Alternate
- SE = Special exempt
- PR = Protected ranking
- ITF = ITF entry
- JE = Junior exempt
- w/o = Walkover
- r = Retired
- d = Defaulted
- SR = Special ranking

First round
1 | (Thailand) Sa Ratiwatana (Thailand) So Ratiwatana | 6 | 6
(Austria) M Neuchrist (Netherlands) M Vervoort | 1 | 3
(Russia) A Kudryavtsev (Ukraine) D Molchanov | 6 | 6
WC | (China) X Gao (China) B Ouyang | 4 | 3
3 | (China) M Gong (Chinese Taipei) C-h Yi | 6 | 6^{3} | [15]
WC | (Japan) H Moriya (China) Z Zhang | 4 | 7^{7} | [13]
(India) Y Bhambri (India) S Myneni | 6 | 6
(China) Z Li (Chinese Taipei) H-y Peng | 1 | 4
(Chinese Taipei) T Chen (India) J Nedunchezhiyan | 6 | 6
PR | (Czech Republic) R Jebavý (Czech Republic) J Šátral | 2 | 2
(Italy) T Fabbiano (India) R Ramanathan | 4 | 6^{3}
4 | (China) Y Bai (Italy) R Ghedin | 6 | 7^{7}
WC | (China) Long Chen (China) Haitong Xia | 3 | 1
(Chinese Taipei) C-p Hsieh (China) D Wu | 6 | 6
(Australia) L Saville (Australia) J Thompson | 6 | 7^{7}
2 | (Croatia) D Marcan (Croatia) F Škugor | 1 | 6^{2}

Quarterfinals
1 | (Thailand) Sa Ratiwatana (Thailand) So Ratiwatana | 5 | 6^{3}
(Russia) A Kudryavtsev (Ukraine) D Molchanov | 7 | 7^{7}
3 | (China) M Gong (Chinese Taipei) C-h Yi | 3 | 6 | [13]
(India) Y Bhambri (India) S Myneni | 6 | 3 | [11]
(Chinese Taipei) T Chen (India) J Nedunchezhiyan | 3 | 6 | [8]
4 | (China) Y Bai (Italy) R Ghedin | 6 | 0 | [10]
(Chinese Taipei) C-p Hsieh (China) D Wu | 6 | 7
(Australia) L Saville (Australia) J Thompson | 2 | 5

Semifinals
(Russia) A Kudryavtsev (Ukraine) D Molchanov | 6^{2} | 6 | [8]
3 | (China) M Gong (Chinese Taipei) C-h Yi | 7^{7} | 3 | [10]
4 | (China) Y Bai (Italy) R Ghedin | 3 | 6 | [6]
(Chinese Taipei) C-p Hsieh (China) D Wu | 6 | 4 | [10]

Final
3 | (China) M Gong (Chinese Taipei) C-h Yi | 2 | 6 | [10]
(Chinese Taipei) C-p Hsieh (China) D Wu | 6 | 1 | [5]
