= 2023 Zhuhai Challenger – Singles =

Singles
- 2023 Zhuhai Challenger

Final
- Champion: (France) Arthur Weber
- Runner-up: (Chinese Taipei) Jason Jung
- Score: 6–3, 5–7, 6–3

Events
Singles	Doubles
← 2019 ·	Zhuhai Challenger	· 2024 →

Enrique López Pérez was the defending champion but was unable to defend his title as he was suspended from professional tennis for match fixing in 2020.

Arthur Weber won the title after defeating Jason Jung 6–3, 5–7, 6–3 in the final.

== Seeds ==
1. (Lithuania) Ričardas Berankis (second round)
2. (Chinese Taipei) Jason Jung (final)
3. (Australia) James McCabe (first round)
4. (Australia) Luke Saville (first round)
5. (Czech Republic) Dominik Palán (second round)
6. (Australia) Philip Sekulic (second round)
7. (Poland) Filip Peliwo (first round)
8. (Vietnam) Lý Hoàng Nam (first round)

== Draw ==
Key

- Q = Qualifier
- WC = Wild card
- LL = Lucky loser
- Alt = Alternate
- ITF = ITF entry
- PR = Protected ranking
- SR = Special ranking
- SE = Special exempt
- JE = Junior exempt
- JR = Junior Accelerator Programme entrant
- CO = College Accelerator Programme entrant
- NG = Next Gen Accelerator Program entrant
- w/o = Walkover
- r = Retired
- d = Defaulted

=== Finals ===
Semifinals
(Greece) Stefanos Sakellaridis	6	4	2
(France) Arthur Weber	4	6	6
WC	(China) Li Zhe	6^{3}	1
2	(Chinese Taipei) Jason Jung	7^{7}	6

Final
(France) Arthur Weber	6	5	6
2	(Chinese Taipei) Jason Jung	3	7	3

=== Top half ===
First round
1	(Lithuania) R Berankis	3	6	6
Alt	(Uzbekistan) S Fomin	6	0	3
Q	(China) Wang Xiaofei	6^{4}	0
(Greece) S Sakellaridis	7^{7}	6
WC	(China) Y Zhou	7	6
(New Zealand) A Rai	5	1
(China) R Te	3	7^{7}	4
6	(Australia) P Sekulic	6	6^{3}	6
4	(Australia) L Saville	6^{5}	3
Q	Aliaksandr Liaonenka	7^{7}	6
(Northern Mariana Islands) C Sinclair	6	6
(Sweden) L Borg	3	2
(Japan) Y Takahashi	6	4	0^{r}
Alt	A Zgirovsky	4	6	1
(France) A Weber	6	6
7	(Poland) F Peliwo	3	3

Second round
1	(Lithuania) R Berankis	6^{2}	6	1
(Greece) S Sakellaridis	7^{7}	3	6
WC	(China) Y Zhou	3	7^{8}	7^{7}
6	(Australia) P Sekulic	6	6^{6}	6^{1}
Q	A Liaonenka	7^{7}	6
(Northern Mariana Islands) C Sinclair	6^{4}	3
Alt	A Zgirovsky	6^{2}	6^{4}
(France) A Weber	7^{7}	7^{7}

Quarterfinals
(Greece) S Sakellaridis	6	7^{10}
WC	(China) Y Zhou	1	6^{8}
Q	A Liaonenka	4	5
(France) A Weber	6	7

Semifinals
(Greece) S Sakellaridis	6	4	2
(France) A Weber	4	6	6

=== Bottom half ===
First round
8	(Vietnam) NH Lý	6^{4}	6^{2}
E Karlovskiy	7^{7}	7^{7}
Q	(Switzerland) L Castelnuovo	6^{4}	7^{7}	7^{7}
(United States) E Zhu	7^{7}	6^{5}	6^{4}
WC	(China) Z Li	6	6
Q	Mikalai Haliak	3	0
Q	(China) H Li	6	6
3	(Australia) J McCabe	2	3
5	(Czech Republic) D Palán	7^{7}	5	6
Q	(Japan) Shuichi Sekiguchi	6^{0}	7	2
(Latvia) R Strombachs	6	3	6
(China) Mu Tao	4	6	4
(New Zealand) R Statham	3	4
(China) F Sun	6	6
WC	(China) Y Bai	2	3
2	(Chinese Taipei) J Jung	6	6

Second round
E Karlovskiy	7^{7}	3	6
Q	(Switzerland) L Castelnuovo	6^{2}	6	1
WC	(China) Z Li	4	6	6
Q	(China) H Li	6	2	2
5	(Czech Republic) D Palán	4	7^{7}	4
(Latvia) R Strombachs	6	6^{4}	6
(China) F Sun	3	6	6^{4}
2	(Chinese Taipei) J Jung	6	3	7^{7}

Quarterfinals
E Karlovskiy	3	3
WC	(China) Z Li	6	6
(Latvia) R Strombachs	4	2
2	(Chinese Taipei) J Jung	6	6

Semifinals
WC	(China) Z Li	6^{3}	1
2	(Chinese Taipei) J Jung	7^{7}	6
