= 2018 Zhuhai Open – Men's doubles =

Men's doubles
- 2018 Zhuhai Open

Final
- Champions: (Ukraine) Denys Molchanov (Slovakia) Igor Zelenay
- Runners-up: (Belarus) Aliaksandr Bury (Chinese Taipei) Peng Hsien-yin
- Score: 7–5, 7–6^{(7–4)}

Events
Singles	men	women
Doubles	men	women
← 2017 ·	Zhuhai Open	· 2019 →

Gong Maoxin and Zhang Ze were the defending champions but lost in the semifinals to Aliaksandr Bury and Peng Hsien-yin.

Denys Molchanov and Igor Zelenay won the title after defeating Bury and Peng 7–5, 7–6^{(7–4)} in the final.

== Seeds ==
1. (India) Sriram Balaji / (Japan) Yasutaka Uchiyama (withdrew)
2. (Croatia) Marin Draganja / (Croatia) Tomislav Draganja (first round)
3. (Spain) Gerard Granollers / (Spain) Marcel Granollers (first round)
4. (Ukraine) Denys Molchanov / (Slovakia) Igor Zelenay (champions)

== Draw ==
=== Key ===
- Q = Qualifier
- WC = Wild card
- LL = Lucky loser
- Alt = Alternate
- SE = Special exempt
- PR = Protected ranking
- ITF = ITF entry
- JE = Junior exempt
- w/o = Walkover
- r = Retired
- d = Defaulted
- SR = Special ranking

First round
Alt	(Italy) L Sonego (Italy) A Vavassori	3	6	[10]
WC	(China) C Wang (China) D Wu	6	3	[8]
(Germany) M Moraing (Germany) O Otte	4	2
WC	(China) M Gong (China) Ze Zhang	6	6
3	(Spain) G Granollers (Spain) M Granollers	6^{6}	4
(Belarus) A Bury (Chinese Taipei) H-y Peng	7^{8}	6
(Russia) M Elgin (Sweden) A Siljeström	6^{5}	3
(Chinese Taipei) J Jung (Indonesia) C Rungkat	7^{7}	6
WC	(Indonesia) J Barki (China) Z Li	6^{6}	6^{3}
(Belarus) U Ignatik (Austria) T-S Weissborn	7^{8}	7^{7}
(Japan) T Matsui (Chinese Taipei) C-h Yi	3	6	[8]
4	(Ukraine) D Molchanov (Slovakia) I Zelenay	6	3	[10]
(Australia) A Bolt (Australia) J Kubler	6	6
Alt	(Italy) S Caruso (Germany) Y Maden	3	4
(Chinese Taipei) C-p Hsieh (Australia) R Junaid	6	6
2	(Croatia) M Draganja (Croatia) T Draganja	2	3

Quarterfinals
Alt	(Italy) L Sonego (Italy) A Vavassori	3	6^{2}
WC	(China) M Gong (China) Ze Zhang	6	7^{7}
(Belarus) A Bury (Chinese Taipei) H-y Peng	6	7^{7}
(Chinese Taipei) J Jung (Indonesia) C Rungkat	4	6^{3}
(Belarus) U Ignatik (Austria) T-S Weissborn	6	6^{6}	[10]
4	(Ukraine) D Molchanov (Slovakia) I Zelenay	4	7^{8}	[12]
(Australia) A Bolt (Australia) J Kubler	6	5	[11]
(Chinese Taipei) C-p Hsieh (Australia) R Junaid	3	7	[9]

Semifinals
WC	(China) M Gong (China) Ze Zhang	6	6^{4}	[2]
(Belarus) A Bury (Chinese Taipei) H-y Peng	3	7^{7}	[10]
4	(Ukraine) D Molchanov (Slovakia) I Zelenay	w/o
(Australia) A Bolt (Australia) J Kubler

Final
(Belarus) A Bury (Chinese Taipei) H-y Peng	5	6^{4}
4	(Ukraine) D Molchanov (Slovakia) I Zelenay	7	7^{7}
