= 2017 Zhuhai Open – Men's singles =

Men's singles
- 2017 Zhuhai Open

Final
- Champion: (Russia) Evgeny Donskoy
- Runner-up: (Italy) Thomas Fabbiano
- Score: 6–3, 6–4

Events
Singles	men	women
Doubles	men	women
← 2016 ·	Zhuhai Open	· 2018 →

Thomas Fabbiano was the defending champion but lost to Evgeny Donskoy 6–3, 6–4 in the final.

== Seeds ==
1. (Russia) Evgeny Donskoy (champion)
2. (Japan) Yūichi Sugita (second round)
3. (South Korea) Lee Duck-hee (first round)
4. (Italy) Luca Vanni (quarterfinals)
5. (Slovenia) Blaž Kavčič (second round)
6. (Germany) Maximilian Marterer (second round)
7. (Italy) Thomas Fabbiano (final)
8. (Belarus) Uladzimir Ignatik (semifinals)

== Draw ==
=== Key ===
- Q = Qualifier
- WC = Wild card
- LL = Lucky loser
- Alt = Alternate
- SE = Special exempt
- PR = Protected ranking
- ITF = ITF entry
- JE = Junior exempt
- w/o = Walkover
- r = Retired
- d = Defaulted
- SR = Special ranking

=== Finals ===
Semifinals
1	(Russia) Evgeny Donskoy	6	7
PR	(India) Yuki Bhambri	3	5
8	(Belarus) Uladzimir Ignatik	6^{6}	4
7	(Italy) Thomas Fabbiano	7^{8}	6

Final
1	(Russia) Evgeny Donskoy	6	6
7	(Italy) Thomas Fabbiano	3	4

=== Top half ===
First round
1	(Russia) E Donskoy	6^{4}	6	7
(Serbia) M Tepavac	7^{7}	4	5
(Belarus) I Ivashka	3	7	4
WC	(China) Y Bai	6	5	6
WC	(China) Y Wu	3	2
(Belgium) J De Loore	6	6
Q	(Spain) J Munar	4	7^{7}	4
6	(Germany) M Marterer	6	6^{2}	6
3	(South Korea) D-h Lee	4	6^{5}
(Italy) S Napolitano	6	7^{7}
(Canada) S Diez	6	6^{3}	6^{2}
(Argentina) A Velotti	2	7^{7}	7^{7}
PR	(India) Y Bhambri	6	6
SE	(Australia) B Mott	2	0
(Portugal) P Sousa	3	3
5	(Slovenia) B Kavčič	6	6

Second round
1	(Russia) E Donskoy	6	6
WC	(China) Y Bai	3	4
(Belgium) J De Loore	6	6
6	(Germany) M Marterer	4	2
(Italy) S Napolitano	6^{3}	6	2
(Argentina) A Velotti	7^{7}	4	6
PR	(India) Y Bhambri	6	6
5	(Slovenia) B Kavčič	1	4

Quarterfinals
1	(Russia) E Donskoy	6	6
(Belgium) J De Loore	3	4
(Argentina) A Velotti	1	1^{r}
PR	(India) Y Bhambri	6	2

Semifinals
1	(Russia) E Donskoy	6	7
PR	(India) Y Bhambri	3	5

=== Bottom half ===
First round
8	(Belarus) U Ignatik	6	6
(Germany) D Masur	2	4
Q	(Italy) L Sonego	6	4
Q	(Germany) Y Maden	2	1^{r}
(Czech Republic) J Šátral	6	1	2
(Chinese Taipei) J Jung	1	6	6
(Japan) H Moriya	2	1
4	(Italy) L Vanni	6	6
7	(Italy) T Fabbiano	6	6
(Serbia) L Đere	4	3
Q	(Japan) Y Uchiyama	1	7^{7}	7
WC	(China) R Te	6	6^{0}	5
WC	(China) D Wu	6	2	4
(China) Z Zhang	1	6	6
(Spain) E López-Pérez	2	4
2	(Japan) Y Sugita	6	6

Second round
8	(Belarus) U Ignatik	6	6
Q	(Italy) L Sonego	4	4
(Chinese Taipei) J Jung	4	4
4	(Italy) L Vanni	6	6
7	(Italy) T Fabbiano	6	6
Q	(Japan) Y Uchiyama	1	0
(China) Z Zhang	6^{5}	6	7^{7}
2	(Japan) Y Sugita	7^{7}	4	6^{5}

Quarterfinals
8	(Belarus) U Ignatik	6	6
4	(Italy) L Vanni	4	4
7	(Italy) T Fabbiano	6	6
(China) Z Zhang	2	1

Semifinals
8	(Belarus) U Ignatik	6^{6}	4
7	(Italy) T Fabbiano	7^{8}	6
