= 2016 Zhuhai Challenger – Singles =

Singles
- 2016 Zhuhai Challenger

Final
- Champion: (Italy) Thomas Fabbiano
- Runner-up: (China) Zhang Ze
- Score: 5–7, 6–1, 6–3

Events
Singles	Doubles
Zhuhai Challenger	· 2017 →

This was the first edition of the tournament.

Thomas Fabbiano won the title after defeating Zhang Ze 5–7, 6–1, 6–3 in the final.

== Seeds ==
1. (India) Yuki Bhambri (semifinals)
2. (Georgia (country)) Nikoloz Basilashvili (first round)
3. (Australia) Jordan Thompson (semifinals)
4. (Italy) Thomas Fabbiano (champion)
5. (India) Saketh Myneni (quarterfinals)
6. (Croatia) Franko Škugor (quarterfinals)
7. (China) Wu Di (first round)
8. (Russia) Alexander Kudryavtsev (quarterfinals)

== Draw ==
=== Key ===
- Q = Qualifier
- WC = Wild card
- LL = Lucky loser
- Alt = Alternate
- SE = Special exempt
- PR = Protected ranking
- ITF = ITF entry
- JE = Junior exempt
- w/o = Walkover
- r = Retired
- d = Defaulted
- SR = Special ranking

=== Finals ===
Semifinals
1	(India) Yuki Bhambri	3	3
4	(Italy) Thomas Fabbiano	6	6
3	(Australia) Jordan Thompson	2	2
(China) Zhang Ze	6	6

Final
4	(Italy) Thomas Fabbiano	5	6	6
(China) Zhang Ze	7	1	3

=== Top half ===
First round
1	(India) Y Bhambri	6	4	7
(Germany) P Gojowczyk	2	6	5
(Czech Republic) J Šátral	2^{r}
(Chinese Taipei) T Chen	5
(Australia) L Saville	3	6	6
(South Korea) D-h Lee	6	4	4
(China) Z Li	1	4
5	(India) S Myneni	6	6
4	(Italy) T Fabbiano	6	6^{5}	6
(Ukraine) D Molchanov	3	7^{7}	1
WC	(China) C Wang	6	6
(Israel) A Weintraub	4	2
(Japan) H Moriya	6	4	6
Q	(Austria) M Neuchrist	3	6	2
(Ukraine) A Smirnov	4	0
6	(Croatia) F Škugor	6	6

Second round
1	(India) Y Bhambri	6	6
(Chinese Taipei) T Chen	3	1
(Australia) L Saville	6^{4}	6^{4}
5	(India) S Myneni	7^{7}	7^{7}
4	(Italy) T Fabbiano	6	6
WC	(China) C Wang	3	0
(Japan) H Moriya	7^{8}	4	3
6	(Croatia) F Škugor	6^{6}	6	6

Quarterfinals
1	(India) Y Bhambri	6	7^{7}
5	(India) S Myneni	4	6^{3}
4	(Italy) T Fabbiano	7	6
6	(Croatia) F Škugor	5	3

Semifinals
1	(India) Y Bhambri	3	3
4	(Italy) T Fabbiano	6	6

=== Bottom half ===
First round
8	(Russia) A Kudryavtsev	6	6
WC	(Turkey) A Çelikbilek	2	2
Q	(South Korea) Kim Cheong-eui	6^{5}	3
Q	(Italy) L Sonego	7^{7}	6
(Germany) N Langer	6^{1}	3
Q	(Germany) K Krawietz	6	7^{7}
(India) R Ramanathan	6^{5}	5
3	(Australia) J Thompson	7^{7}	7
7	(China) D Wu	2	4
(China) Z Zhang	6	6
WC	(China) B Ouyang	6
(Japan) Y Uchiyama	2^{r}
(Hungary) M Fucsovics	4	6	6
WC	(China) X Gao	6	3	1
(China) Y Bai	6	7^{7}
2	(Georgia (country)) N Basilashvili	4	6^{5}

Second round
8	(Russia) A Kudryavtsev	6	4	6
Q	(Italy) L Sonego	3	6	3
Q	(Germany) K Krawietz	3	3
3	(Australia) J Thompson	6	6
(China) Z Zhang	6	7^{7}
WC	(China) B Ouyang	4	6^{1}
(Hungary) M Fucsovics	7	6
(China) Y Bai	5	2

Quarterfinals
8	(Russia) A Kudryavtsev	3	0
3	(Australia) J Thompson	6	6
(China) Z Zhang	7	6^{5}	6
(Hungary) M Fucsovics	5	7^{7}	2

Semifinals
3	(Australia) J Thompson	2	2
(China) Z Zhang	6	6
