= 2018 Zhuhai Open – Men's singles =

Men's singles
- 2018 Zhuhai Open

Final
- Champion: (Australia) Alex Bolt
- Runner-up: (Poland) Hubert Hurkacz
- Score: 5–7, 7–6^{(7–4)}, 6–2

Events
Singles	men	women
Doubles	men	women
← 2017 ·	Zhuhai Open	· 2019 →

Evgeny Donskoy was the defending champion but chose not to defend his title.

Alex Bolt won the title after defeating Hubert Hurkacz 5–7, 7–6^{(7–4)}, 6–2 in the final.

== Seeds ==
1. (Australia) Jordan Thompson (first round)
2. (Tunisia) Malek Jaziri (quarterfinals)
3. (Spain) Marcel Granollers (second round)
4. (Germany) Oscar Otte (semifinals, retired)
5. (Germany) Yannick Maden (second round)
6. (Belarus) Ilya Ivashka (second round)
7. (Estonia) Jürgen Zopp (first round)
8. (Russia) Alexey Vatutin (first round)

== Draw ==
=== Key ===
- Q = Qualifier
- WC = Wild card
- LL = Lucky loser
- Alt = Alternate
- SE = Special exempt
- PR = Protected ranking
- ITF = ITF entry
- JE = Junior exempt
- w/o = Walkover
- r = Retired
- d = Defaulted
- SR = Special ranking

=== Finals ===
Semifinals
(Chinese Taipei) Jason Jung	1	7^{8}	4
(Poland) Hubert Hurkacz	6	6^{6}	6
4	(Germany) Oscar Otte	5^{r}
Q	(Australia) Alex Bolt	6

Final
(Poland) Hubert Hurkacz	7	6^{4}	2
Q	(Australia) Alex Bolt	5	7^{7}	6

=== Top half ===
First round
1	(Australia) J Thompson	4	2
(Serbia) M Kecmanović	6	6
(Chinese Taipei) J Jung	6	6
WC	(China) Ze Zhang	0	3
(Slovenia) B Rola	6^{4}	1
(Germany) M Moraing	7^{7}	6
WC	(China) Z Li	3	2
5	(Germany) Y Maden	6	6
3	(Spain) M Granollers	6	6
(Italy) L Sonego	3	3
(South Korea) S-w Kwon	6^{8}	6	3
(Belarus) U Ignatik	7^{10}	2	0^{r}
(Croatia) V Galović	3	4
(Poland) H Hurkacz	6	6
(Japan) Y Uchiyama	4	2
6	(Belarus) I Ivashka	6	6

Second round
(Serbia) M Kecmanović	6	6^{0}	4
(Chinese Taipei) J Jung	3	7^{7}	6
(Germany) M Moraing	6	7^{7}
5	(Germany) Y Maden	4	6^{5}
3	(Spain) M Granollers	5	4
(South Korea) S-w Kwon	7	6
(Poland) H Hurkacz	7^{7}	7^{7}
6	(Belarus) I Ivashka	6^{2}	6^{4}

Quarterfinals
(Chinese Taipei) J Jung	6	3	6
(Germany) M Moraing	2	6	3
(South Korea) S-w Kwon	3	0
(Poland) H Hurkacz	6	6

Semifinals
(Chinese Taipei) J Jung	1	7^{8}	4
(Poland) H Hurkacz	6	6^{6}	6

=== Bottom half ===
First round
7	(Estonia) J Zopp	2	1
(Spain) J Munar	6	6
(Australia) J Kubler	6	7^{10}
Q	(Australia) M Banes	2	6^{8}
(Japan) T Ito	3	3
(Italy) S Napolitano	6	6
WC	(China) Zh Zhang	2	3
4	(Germany) O Otte	6	6
8	(Russia) A Vatutin	3	3
Q	(Australia) A Bolt	6	6
(Italy) S Caruso	6	6
(Japan) G Soeda	3	4
WC	(China) D Wu	6	6
Q	(China) Xia Zihao	4	4
Q	(Japan) Y Takahashi	1	2
2	(Tunisia) M Jaziri	6	6

Second round
(Spain) J Munar	6^{7}	6	3
(Australia) J Kubler	7^{9}	3	6
(Italy) S Napolitano	5	3
4	(Germany) O Otte	7	6
Q	(Australia) A Bolt	6	6
(Italy) S Caruso	3	2
WC	(China) D Wu	4	6	4
2	(Tunisia) M Jaziri	6	1	6

Quarterfinals
(Australia) J Kubler	3	2
4	(Germany) O Otte	6	6
Q	(Australia) A Bolt	6	6
2	(Tunisia) M Jaziri	1	4

Semifinals
4	(Germany) O Otte	5^{r}
Q	(Australia) A Bolt	6
