= 2017 International Challenger Quanzhou – Doubles =

Doubles
- 2017 International Challenger Quanzhou

Final
- Champions: (Chinese Taipei) Hsieh Cheng-peng (Chinese Taipei) Peng Hsien-yin
- Runners-up: (Germany) Andre Begemann (Belarus) Aliaksandr Bury
- Score: 3–6, 6–4, [10–7]

Events
Singles	Doubles
International Challenger Quanzhou

This was the first edition of the tournament.

Hsieh Cheng-peng and Peng Hsien-yin won the title after defeating Andre Begemann and Aliaksandr Bury 3–6, 6–4, [10–7] in the final.

== Seeds ==
1. (Germany) Andre Begemann / (Belarus) Aliaksandr Bury (final)
2. (Thailand) Sanchai Ratiwatana / (Thailand) Sonchat Ratiwatana (first round)
3. (Croatia) Dino Marcan / (Austria) Tristan-Samuel Weissborn (semifinals)
4. (India) Jeevan Nedunchezhiyan / (Indonesia) Christopher Rungkat (semifinals)

== Draw ==
=== Key ===
- Q = Qualifier
- WC = Wild card
- LL = Lucky loser
- Alt = Alternate
- SE = Special exempt
- PR = Protected ranking
- ITF = ITF entry
- JE = Junior exempt
- w/o = Walkover
- r = Retired
- d = Defaulted
- SR = Special ranking

First round
1	(Germany) A Begemann (Belarus) A Bury	6	6
PR	(Serbia) I Bozoljac (Serbia) N Milojević	2	3
Alt	(Russia) A Karatsev (France) A Michon	7^{7}	6
(Portugal) P Sousa (Argentina) A Velotti	6^{4}	3
4	(India) J Nedunchezhiyan (Indonesia) C Rungkat	7^{7}	7^{7}
WC	(China) D Wu (China) Zh Zhang	6^{5}	6^{5}
(South Africa) R Roelofse (Chinese Taipei) C-h Yi	6	6
WC	(China) Gong Xiao (China) Li Zhao-tai	4	2
(Germany) G Kretschmer (Germany) A Satschko	7^{9}	6
(Belarus) U Ignatik (Kazakhstan) A Nedovyesov	6^{7}	4
(Belarus) I Ivashka (Italy) S Napolitano	1	3
3	(Croatia) D Marcan (Austria) T-S Weissborn	6	6
WC	(China) Y Bai (China) R Te	4	4
(Chinese Taipei) C-p Hsieh (Chinese Taipei) H-y Peng	6	6
(Japan) T Matsui (Chinese Taipei) T-h Yang	1	6	[10]
2	(Thailand) Sa Ratiwatana (Thailand) So Ratiwatana	6	3	[6]

Quarterfinals
1	(Germany) A Begemann (Belarus) A Bury	6	6
Alt	(Russia) A Karatsev (France) A Michon	1	2
4	(India) J Nedunchezhiyan (Indonesia) C Rungkat	4	7^{7}	[10]
(South Africa) R Roelofse (Chinese Taipei) C-h Yi	6	6^{3}	[8]
(Germany) G Kretschmer (Germany) A Satschko	3	6^{4}
3	(Croatia) D Marcan (Austria) T-S Weissborn	6	7^{7}
(Chinese Taipei) C-p Hsieh (Chinese Taipei) H-y Peng	6	7^{7}
(Japan) T Matsui (Chinese Taipei) T-h Yang	3	6^{2}

Semifinals
1	(Germany) A Begemann (Belarus) A Bury	6	6
4	(India) J Nedunchezhiyan (Indonesia) C Rungkat	3	4
3	(Croatia) D Marcan (Austria) T-S Weissborn	3	7	[6]
(Chinese Taipei) C-p Hsieh (Chinese Taipei) H-y Peng	6	5	[10]

Final
1	(Germany) A Begemann (Belarus) A Bury	6	4	[7]
(Chinese Taipei) C-p Hsieh (Chinese Taipei) H-y Peng	3	6	[10]
