= 2017 International Challenger Quanzhou =

- Date: 20–25 March
- Edition: 1st
- Surface: Hard
- Location: Quanzhou, China

Champions

Singles
- (Italy) Thomas Fabbiano

Doubles
- (Chinese Taipei) Hsieh Cheng-peng / (Chinese Taipei) Peng Hsien-yin
International Challenger Quanzhou

The 2017 International Challenger Quanzhou was a professional tennis tournament played on hard courts. It was the first edition of the tournament which was part of the 2017 ATP Challenger Tour. It took place in Quanzhou, China between 20 and 25 March 2017.

== Singles main draw entrants ==
=== Seeds ===
Country	Player	Rank^{1}	Seed
JPN	Yūichi Sugita	115	1
KOR	Lee Duck-hee	135	2
ITA	Luca Vanni	139	3
SLO	Blaž Kavčič	147	4
GER	Maximilian Marterer	152	5
ITA	Thomas Fabbiano	161	6
BLR	Uladzimir Ignatik	163	7
ESP	Enrique López-Pérez	172	8

- ^{1} Rankings are as of 6 March 2017.

=== Other entrants ===
The following players received wildcards into the singles main draw:

- (China) Bai Yan
- (China) Te Rigele
- (China) Xia Zihao
- (China) Zhang Zhizhen

The following player received entry into the singles main draw using a protected ranking:

- (India) Yuki Bhambri

The following players received entry from the qualifying draw:

- (Italy) Matteo Berrettini
- (Poland) Hubert Hurkacz
- (Italy) Andrea Pellegrino
- (Italy) Lorenzo Sonego

The following player received entry as a lucky loser:

- (Japan) Shuichi Sekiguchi

== Champions ==
=== Singles ===
- (Italy) Thomas Fabbiano def. (Italy) Matteo Berrettini 7–6^{(7–5)}, 7–6^{(9–7)}.

=== Doubles ===
- (Chinese Taipei) Hsieh Cheng-peng / (Chinese Taipei) Peng Hsien-yin def. (Germany) Andre Begemann / (Belarus) Aliaksandr Bury 3–6, 6–4, [10–7].
