= 2017 International Challenger Quanzhou – Singles =

Singles
- 2017 International Challenger Quanzhou

Final
- Champion: (Italy) Thomas Fabbiano
- Runner-up: (Italy) Matteo Berrettini
- Score: 7–6^{(7–5)}, 7–6^{(9–7)}

Events
Singles	Doubles
International Challenger Quanzhou

This was the first edition of the tournament.

Thomas Fabbiano won the title after defeating Matteo Berrettini 7–6^{(7–5)}, 7–6^{(9–7)} in the final.

== Seeds ==
1. (Japan) Yūichi Sugita (first round)
2. (South Korea) Lee Duck-hee (quarterfinals)
3. (Italy) Luca Vanni (first round)
4. (Slovenia) Blaž Kavčič (second round)
5. (Germany) Maximilian Marterer (semifinals)
6. (Italy) Thomas Fabbiano (champion)
7. (Belarus) Uladzimir Ignatik (quarterfinals)
8. (Spain) Enrique López-Pérez (first round)

== Draw ==
=== Key ===
- Q = Qualifier
- WC = Wild card
- LL = Lucky loser
- Alt = Alternate
- SE = Special exempt
- PR = Protected ranking
- ITF = ITF entry
- JE = Junior exempt
- w/o = Walkover
- r = Retired
- d = Defaulted
- SR = Special ranking

=== Finals ===
Semifinals
(Belarus) Ilya Ivashka	0^{r}
6	(Italy) Thomas Fabbiano	4
5	(Germany) Maximilian Marterer	4	6	3
Q	(Italy) Matteo Berrettini	6	3	6

Final
6	(Italy) Thomas Fabbiano	7^{7}	7^{9}
Q	(Italy) Matteo Berrettini	6^{5}	6^{7}

=== Top half ===
First round
1	(Japan) Y Sugita	7	1	4
(Belarus) I Ivashka	5	6	6
(Serbia) N Milojević	6	5	4
Q	(Poland) H Hurkacz	4	7	6
(Argentina) A Velotti	6^{5}	4
LL	(Japan) Shuichi Sekiguchi	7^{7}	6
(Spain) J Munar	4	6	3
7	(Belarus) U Ignatik	6	3	6
3	(Italy) L Vanni	4	3
(Russia) A Karatsev	6	6
WC	(China) Zh Zhang	4	2
(Canada) S Diez	6	6
(Kazakhstan) A Nedovyesov	6	6
WC	(China) Xia Zihao	1	2
Q	(Italy) L Sonego	2	4
6	(Italy) T Fabbiano	6	6

Second round
(Belarus) I Ivashka	6	4	7
Q	(Poland) H Hurkacz	4	6	5
LL	(Japan) S Sekiguchi	6^{11}	4
7	(Belarus) U Ignatik	7^{13}	6
(Russia) A Karatsev	1	6	2
(Canada) S Diez	6	1	6
(Kazakhstan) A Nedovyesov	5	6	5
6	(Italy) T Fabbiano	7	4	7

Quarterfinals
(Belarus) I Ivashka	7^{11}	6
7	(Belarus) U Ignatik	6^{9}	2
(Canada) S Diez	0	2
6	(Italy) T Fabbiano	6	6

Semifinals
(Belarus) I Ivashka	0^{r}
6	(Italy) T Fabbiano	4

=== Bottom half ===
First round
5	(Germany) M Marterer	6	3
(Australia) M Matosevic	3	0^{r}
(Australia) C O'Connell	6	6
Q	(Italy) A Pellegrino	1	3
PR	(India) Y Bhambri	7^{7}	6
(Japan) T Ito	6^{2}	2
(Japan) Y Uchiyama	3	5
4	(Slovenia) B Kavčič	6	7
8	(Spain) E López-Pérez	6^{2}	6^{5}
Q	(Italy) M Berrettini	7^{7}	7^{7}
WC	(China) Y Bai	4	2
(Portugal) P Sousa	6	6
(Italy) S Napolitano	1	4
(China) D Wu	6	6
WC	(China) R Te	4	6^{5}
2	(South Korea) D-h Lee	6	7^{7}

Second round
5	(Germany) M Marterer	6	6
(Australia) C O'Connell	4	2
PR	(India) Y Bhambri	2	6	6
4	(Slovenia) B Kavčič	6	3	4
Q	(Italy) M Berrettini	6	6^{2}	6
(Portugal) P Sousa	4	7^{7}	2
(China) D Wu	6^{4}	7^{8}	2
2	(South Korea) D-h Lee	7^{7}	6^{6}	6

Quarterfinals
5	(Germany) M Marterer	6	6
PR	(India) Y Bhambri	3	2
Q	(Italy) M Berrettini	6	6^{6}	6
2	(South Korea) D-h Lee	4	7^{8}	1

Semifinals
5	(Germany) M Marterer	4	6	3
Q	(Italy) M Berrettini	6	3	6
