= 2018 Zhuhai Open – Women's singles =

Women's singles
- 2018 Zhuhai Open

Final
- Champion: (Belgium) Maryna Zanevska
- Runner-up: (Ukraine) Marta Kostyuk
- Score: 6–2, 6–4

Events
Singles	men	women
Doubles	men	women
← 2017 ·	Zhuhai Open	· 2019 →

Denisa Allertová was the defending champion, but lost to Vitalia Diatchenko in the first round.

Maryna Zanevska won the title, defeating Marta Kostyuk in the final, 6–2, 6–4.

== Seeds ==
1. (Czech Republic) Denisa Allertová (first round)
2. (Japan) Nao Hibino (first round)
3. (Thailand) Luksika Kumkhum (first round)
4. (Slovakia) Viktória Kužmová (quarterfinals)
5. (China) Zheng Saisai (withdrew)
6. (Montenegro) Danka Kovinić (first round)
7. (Japan) Miyu Kato (first round)
8. (Slovakia) Anna Karolína Schmiedlová (semifinals)

== Draw ==
=== Key ===
- Q = Qualifier
- WC = Wild card
- LL = Lucky loser
- Alt = Alternate
- SE = Special exempt
- PR = Protected ranking
- ITF = ITF entry
- JE = Junior exempt
- w/o = Walkover
- r = Retired
- d = Defaulted
- SR = Special ranking

=== Finals ===
Semifinals
8	(Slovakia) Anna Karolína Schmiedlová	2	4
(Ukraine) Marta Kostyuk	6	6
(Belgium) Maryna Zanevska	7	6
(Russia) Anna Kalinskaya	5	4

Final
(Ukraine) Marta Kostyuk	2	4
(Belgium) Maryna Zanevska	6	6

=== Top half ===
First round
1	(Czech Republic) D Allertová	6	1	3
(Russia) V Diatchenko	3	6	6
WC	(China) X Jiang	0	2
(Netherlands) L Kerkhove	6	6
Q	(China) A Gai	6^{6}	6^{2}
(Russia) P Monova	7^{8}	7^{7}
WC	(China) Q Tang	0	2
8	(Slovakia) AK Schmiedlová	6	6
3	(Thailand) L Kumkhum	4	5
(Italy) J Paolini	6	7
(Slovenia) D Jakupović	3	7^{7}	3
(Romania) A Cadanțu	6	6^{5}	0^{r}
(Ukraine) M Kostyuk	7^{7}	6
Q	(Poland) U Radwańska	6^{3}	2
Q	(China) F Xun	6	6
6	(Montenegro) D Kovinić	3	4

Second round
(Russia) V Diatchenko	6^{1}	7^{7}	6
(Netherlands) L Kerkhove	7^{7}	6^{3}	2
(Russia) P Monova	0	3
8	(Slovakia) AK Schmiedlová	6	6
(Italy) J Paolini	4	5
(Slovenia) D Jakupović	6	7
(Ukraine) M Kostyuk	6	6
Q	(China) F Xun	1	2

Quarterfinals
(Russia) V Diatchenko	3	3
8	(Slovakia) AK Schmiedlová	6	6
(Slovenia) D Jakupović	3	5
(Ukraine) M Kostyuk	6	7

Semifinals
8	(Slovakia) AK Schmiedlová	2	4
(Ukraine) M Kostyuk	6	6

=== Bottom half ===
First round
LL	(China) S Feng	4	5
(Australia) L Cabrera	6	7
Q	(Italy) J Pieri	4	0^{r}
(Belgium) M Zanevska	6	1
(Italy) D Chiesa	6	6
(Greece) V Grammatikopoulou	1	2
WC	(China) Y Yuan	4	1
4	(Slovakia) V Kužmová	6	6
7	(Japan) M Kato	2	2
(Russia) A Blinkova	6	6
(Russia) A Kalinskaya	7^{7}	6
(China) F Liu	6^{4}	3
WC	(China) X Gao	2	6^{1}
(China) Jin Lu	6	7^{7}
(Australia) D Aiava	6	2	6
2	(Japan) N Hibino	3	6	3

Second round
(Australia) L Cabrera	3	3
(Belgium) M Zanevska	6	6
(Italy) D Chiesa	1	2
4	(Slovakia) V Kužmová	6	6
(Russia) A Blinkova	4	2
(Russia) A Kalinskaya	6	6
(China) Jin Lu	4	4
(Australia) D Aiava	6	6

Quarterfinals
(Belgium) M Zanevska	4	7^{7}	6
4	(Slovakia) V Kužmová	6	6^{5}	0
(Russia) A Kalinskaya	6	6
(Australia) D Aiava	4	4

Semifinals
(Belgium) M Zanevska	7	6
(Russia) A Kalinskaya	5	4
