= 2023 Zhuhai Challenger =

- Date: 21–26 August
- Edition: 5th
- Category: ATP Challenger Tour
- Surface: Hard
- Location: Zhuhai, China

Champions

Singles
- (France) Arthur Weber

Doubles
- (Switzerland) Luca Castelnuovo / (Poland) Filip Peliwo
- Zhuhai Challenger

The 2023 Zhuhai Challenger was a professional tennis tournament played on hard courts. It was the fifth edition of the tournament and part of the 2023 ATP Challenger Tour. It took place in Zhuhai, China between 21 and 26 August 2023.

== Singles main-draw entrants ==
=== Seeds ===
Country	Player	Rank^{1}	Seed
LTU	Ričardas Berankis	239	1
TPE	Jason Jung	258	2
AUS	James McCabe	281	3
AUS	Luke Saville	306	4
CZE	Dominik Palán	312	5
AUS	Philip Sekulic	328	6
POL	Filip Peliwo	344	7
VIE	Lý Hoàng Nam	359	8

- ^{1} Rankings are as of 14 August 2023.

=== Other entrants ===
The following players received wildcards into the singles main draw:

- (China) Bai Yan
- (China) Li Zhe
- (China) Zhou Yi

The following players received entry into the singles main draw as alternates:

- (Uzbekistan) Sergey Fomin
- Alexander Zgirovsky

The following players received entry from the qualifying draw:

- (Switzerland) Luca Castelnuovo
- Mikalai Haliak
- (China) Li Hanwen
- Aliaksandr Liaonenka
- (Japan) Shuichi Sekiguchi
- (China) Wang Xiaofei

== Champions ==
=== Singles ===
- (France) Arthur Weber def. (Chinese Taipei) Jason Jung 6–3, 5–7, 6–3.

=== Doubles ===
- (Switzerland) Luca Castelnuovo / (Poland) Filip Peliwo def. (China) Li Hanwen / (China) Li Zhe 7–5, 7–6^{(7–4)}.
