= 2019 Zhuhai Open =

Professional tennis tournament

- Date: 4–10 March
- Edition: 4th
- Category: ATP Challenger Tour
- Surface: Hard
- Location: Zhuhai, China

Champions

Singles
- (Spain) Enrique López Pérez

Doubles
- (China) Gong Maoxin / (China) Zhang Ze
← 2018 ·	Zhuhai Open	· 2023 →

The 2019 Zhuhai Open was a professional tennis tournament played on hard courts. It was the fourth edition of the tournament and part of the 2019 ATP Challenger Tour. It took place in Zhuhai, China between 4 and 10 March 2019.

== Singles main-draw entrants ==
=== Seeds ===
Country	Player	Rank^{1}	Seed
CAN	Brayden Schnur	107	1
CYP	Marcos Baghdatis	128	2
GER	Oscar Otte	156	3
JPN	Hiroki Moriya	173	4
ISR	Dudi Sela	182	5
GER	Rudolf Molleker	183	6
KAZ	Aleksandr Nedovyesov	191	7
GER	Mats Moraing	193	8
AUT	Jurij Rodionov	194	9
CHN	Zhang Ze	200	10
SLO	Blaž Rola	203	11
AUS	Marc Polmans	211	12
CRO	Viktor Galović	215	13
EGY	Mohamed Safwat	218	14
ARG	Pedro Cachin	236	15
BRA	Guilherme Clezar	237	16

- ^{1} Rankings are as of 25 February 2019.

=== Other entrants ===
The following players received wildcards into the singles main draw:

- (China) Gao Xin
- (China) He Yecong
- (China) Hua Runhao
- (China) Xia Zihao
- (China) Zhang Zhizhen

The following players received entry into the singles main draw using their ITF World Tennis Ranking:

- (Spain) Javier Barranco Cosano
- (Italy) Raúl Brancaccio
- (France) Baptiste Crepatte
- (Egypt) Karim-Mohamed Maamoun

The following players received entry from the qualifying draw:

- (China) Bai Yan
- (Finland) Harri Heliövaara

== Champions ==
=== Singles ===
- (Spain) Enrique López Pérez def. (Russia) Evgeny Karlovskiy 6–1, 6–4.

=== Doubles ===
- (China) Gong Maoxin / (China) Zhang Ze def. (Australia) Max Purcell / (Australia) Luke Saville 6–4, 6–4.
