= 2017 Zhuhai Open – Women's doubles =

Women's doubles
- 2017 Zhuhai Open

Final
- Champions: (Netherlands) Lesley Kerkhove (Belarus) Lidziya Marozava
- Runners-up: (Ukraine) Lyudmyla Kichenok (Ukraine) Nadiia Kichenok
- Score: 6–4, 6–2

Events
Singles	men	women
Doubles	men	women
← 2016 ·	Zhuhai Open	· 2018 →

Ankita Raina and Emily Webley-Smith were the defending champions, but both players chose not to participate.

Lesley Kerkhove and Lidziya Marozava won the title, defeating Lyudmyla and Nadiia Kichenok 6–4, 6–2 in the final.

== Seeds ==
1. (Ukraine) Lyudmyla Kichenok / (Ukraine) Nadiia Kichenok (final)
2. (Netherlands) Lesley Kerkhove / (Belarus) Lidziya Marozava (champions)
3. (Australia) Jessica Moore / (Serbia) Nina Stojanović (quarterfinals)
4. (Israel) Julia Glushko / (Japan) Eri Hozumi (first round)

== Draw ==
=== Key ===
- Q = Qualifier
- WC = Wild card
- LL = Lucky loser
- Alt = Alternate
- SE = Special exempt
- PR = Protected ranking
- ITF = ITF entry
- JE = Junior exempt
- w/o = Walkover
- r = Retired
- d = Defaulted
- SR = Special ranking

First round
1	(Ukraine) L Kichenok (Ukraine) N Kichenok	6	6
(Netherlands) A Rus (Switzerland) A Sadiković	4	2
(Poland) K Piter (Belgium) M Zanevska	6^{3}	6	[8]
(Chinese Taipei) K-c Chang (China) K Zhang	7^{7}	4	[10]
4	(Israel) J Glushko (Japan) E Hozumi	6^{5}	4
(Russia) K Lykina (Japan) R Sawayanagi	7^{7}	6
(Turkey) İ Soylu (Czech Republic) B Štefková	6	6
(Australia) L Cabrera (Russia) A Kalinskaya	3	3
WC	(China) S Chen (China) Q Tang	2	5
WC	(China) X Han (China) Q Ye	6	7
(Japan) H Kuwata (China) L Zhu	3	4
3	(Australia) J Moore (Serbia) N Stojanović	6	6
WC	(China) X Gao (China) F Xun	3	7	[10]
(Russia) V Kudermetova (Russia) V Savinykh	6	5	[4]
(Chinese Taipei) C-w Chan (China) J Lu	7^{7}	1	[4]
2	(Netherlands) L Kerkhove (Belarus) L Marozava	6^{5}	6	[10]

Quarterfinals
1	(Ukraine) L Kichenok (Ukraine) N Kichenok	w/o
(Chinese Taipei) K-c Chang (China) K Zhang
(Russia) K Lykina (Japan) R Sawayanagi	6	2	[9]
(Turkey) İ Soylu (Czech Republic) B Štefková	4	6	[11]
WC	(China) X Han (China) Q Ye	7^{7}	6
3	(Australia) J Moore (Serbia) N Stojanović	6^{3}	4
WC	(China) X Gao (China) F Xun	3	1
2	(Netherlands) L Kerkhove (Belarus) L Marozava	6	6

Semifinals
1	(Ukraine) L Kichenok (Ukraine) N Kichenok	6	6
(Turkey) İ Soylu (Czech Republic) B Štefková	4	3
WC	(China) X Han (China) Q Ye	6	1	[8]
2	(Netherlands) L Kerkhove (Belarus) L Marozava	4	6	[10]

Final
1	(Ukraine) L Kichenok (Ukraine) N Kichenok	4	2
2	(Netherlands) L Kerkhove (Belarus) L Marozava	6	6
