= 2019 Zhuhai Open – Doubles =

Doubles
- 2019 Zhuhai Open

Final
- Champions: (China) Gong Maoxin (China) Zhang Ze
- Runners-up: (Australia) Max Purcell (Australia) Luke Saville
- Score: 6–4, 6–4

Events
Singles	Doubles
- Zhuhai Open

Denys Molchanov and Igor Zelenay were the defending champions but chose not to defend their title.

Gong Maoxin and Zhang Ze won the title after defeating Max Purcell and Luke Saville 6–4, 6–4 in the final.

== Seeds ==
1. (China) Gong Maoxin / (China) Zhang Ze (champions)
2. (Australia) Max Purcell / (Australia) Luke Saville (final)
3. (India) Sriram Balaji / (Mexico) Hans Hach Verdugo (first round)
4. (China) Li Zhe / (Portugal) Gonçalo Oliveira (semifinals)

== Draw ==
Key

- Q = Qualifier
- WC = Wild card
- LL = Lucky loser
- Alt = Alternate
- ITF = ITF entry
- PR = Protected ranking
- SR = Special ranking
- SE = Special exempt
- JE = Junior exempt
- JR = Junior Accelerator Programme entrant
- CO = College Accelerator Programme entrant
- NG = Next Gen Accelerator Program entrant
- w/o = Walkover
- r = Retired
- d = Defaulted

First round
1	(China) M Gong (China) Ze Zhang	7	6
(Australia) M Polmans (Canada) B Schnur	5	4
WC	(China) D Wu (China) Y Wu	2	7^{7}	[10]
ITF	(France) Baptiste Crepatte (Egypt) K-M Maamoun	6	6^{3}	[7]
3	(India) S Balaji (Mexico) H Hach Verdugo	4	4
(India) S Myneni (Thailand) Sa Ratiwatana	6	6
(Serbia) N Ćaćić (Japan) H Moriya	7	6
(Finland) H Heliövaara (Chile) H Podlipnik Castillo	5	2
(Spain) E López Pérez (Slovenia) B Rola	7	6^{5}	[10]
WC	(China) X Gao (China) Zh Zhang	5	7^{7}	[12]
(Germany) M Moraing (Germany) O Otte	3	1
4	(China) Z Li (Portugal) G Oliveira	6	6
ITF	(Spain) J Barranco Cosano (Italy) R Brancaccio	5	7	[8]
(Philippines) R Gonzales (United States) A Lawson	7	5	[10]
WC	(China) Y He (China) Xia Zihao	4	1
2	(Australia) M Purcell (Australia) L Saville	6	6

Quarterfinals
1	(China) M Gong (China) Ze Zhang	5	6	[10]
WC	(China) D Wu (China) Y Wu	7	4	[4]
(India) S Myneni (Thailand) Sa Ratiwatana	2	5
(Serbia) N Ćaćić (Japan) H Moriya	6	7
WC	(China) X Gao (China) Zh Zhang	5	3
4	(China) Z Li (Portugal) G Oliveira	7	6
(Philippines) R Gonzales (United States) A Lawson	2	4
2	(Australia) M Purcell (Australia) L Saville	6	6

Semifinals
1	(China) M Gong (China) Ze Zhang	7^{7}	6
(Serbia) N Čačić (Japan) H Moriya	6^{5}	3
4	(China) Z Li (Portugal) G Oliveira	6^{4}	6	[9]
2	(Australia) M Purcell (Australia) L Saville	7^{7}	4	[11]

Final
1	(China) M Gong (China) Ze Zhang	6	6
2	(Australia) M Purcell (Australia) L Saville	4	4
