= 2017 Zhuhai Open =

- Date: 6–12 March
- Edition: 2nd (ATP); 3rd (ITF)
- Category: ATP Challenger Tour; ITF Women's Circuit
- Prize money: $50,000+H (ATP) $60,000 (ITF)
- Surface: Hard
- Location: Zhuhai, China
- Venue: Hengqin International Tennis Center

Champions

Men's singles
- (Russia) Evgeny Donskoy

Women's singles
- (Czech Republic) Denisa Allertová

Men's doubles
- (China) Gong Maoxin / (China) Zhang Ze

Women's doubles
- (Netherlands) Lesley Kerkhove / (Belarus) Lidziya Marozava
← 2016 ·	Zhuhai Open	· 2018 →

The 2017 Zhuhai Open was a professional tennis tournament played on outdoor hard courts. It was the second (ATP) and third (ITF) editions of the tournament and was part of the 2017 ATP Challenger Tour and the 2017 ITF Women's Circuit, offering $50,000+H (ATP) and $60,000 (ITF) in prize money. It took place at the Hengqin International Tennis Center in Zhuhai, China, from 6–12 March 2017.

== Men's singles main draw entrants ==
=== Seeds ===
Country	Player	Rank^{1}	Seed
RUS	Evgeny Donskoy	116	1
JPN	Yūichi Sugita	134	2
KOR	Lee Duck-hee	135	3
ITA	Luca Vanni	138	4
SLO	Blaž Kavčič	149	5
GER	Maximilian Marterer	151	6
ITA	Thomas Fabbiano	158	7
BLR	Uladzimir Ignatik	160	8

- ^{1} Rankings as of 27 February 2017.

=== Other entrants ===
The following players received wildcards into the singles main draw:

- (China) Bai Yan
- (China) Te Rigele
- (China) Wu Di
- (China) Wu Yibing

The following player received entry into the singles main draw with a protected ranking:

- (India) Yuki Bhambri

The following player received entry into the singles main draw with a special exempt:

- (Australia) Blake Mott

The following players received entry from the qualifying draw:

- (Germany) Yannick Maden
- (Spain) Jaume Munar
- (Italy) Lorenzo Sonego
- (Japan) Yasutaka Uchiyama

== Women's singles main draw entrants ==
=== Seeds ===
Country	Player	Rank^{1}	Seed
TPE	Hsieh Su-wei	98	1
RUS	Ekaterina Alexandrova	109	2
CHN	Zhu Lin	110	3
CHN	Zheng Saisai	111	4
TPE	Chang Kai-chen	113	5
CZE	Denisa Allertová	114	6
BEL	Maryna Zanevska	122	7
SRB	Nina Stojanović	127	8

- ^{1} Rankings as of 27 February 2017

=== Other entrants ===
The following players received wildcards into the singles main draw:

- (China) Gao Xinyu
- (China) Lu Jingjing
- (China) Xun Fangying
- (China) Zhang Yuxuan

The following players received entry from the qualifying draw:

- (South Korea) Han Na-lae
- (Netherlands) Lesley Kerkhove
- (Switzerland) Patty Schnyder
- (China) Tang Haochen

== Champions ==
=== Men's singles ===
- (Russia) Evgeny Donskoy def. (Italy) Thomas Fabbiano 6–3, 6–4.

=== Women's singles ===
- (Czech Republic) Denisa Allertová def. (China) Zheng Saisai 6–3, 2–6, 6–4.

=== Men's doubles ===
- (China) Gong Maoxin / (China) Zhang Ze def. (South Africa) Ruan Roelofse / (Chinese Taipei) Yi Chu-huan 6–3, 7–6^{(7–4)}.

=== Women's doubles ===
- (Netherlands) Lesley Kerkhove / (Belarus) Lidziya Marozava def. (Ukraine) Lyudmyla Kichenok / (Ukraine) Nadiia Kichenok 6–4, 6–2.
