= 2018 Zhuhai Open – Women's doubles =

Women's doubles
- 2018 Zhuhai Open

Final
- Champions: (Russia) Anna Blinkova (Netherlands) Lesley Kerkhove
- Runners-up: (Japan) Nao Hibino (Montenegro) Danka Kovinić
- Score: 7–5, 6–4

Events
Singles	men	women
Doubles	men	women
← 2017 ·	Zhuhai Open	· 2019 →

Lesley Kerkhove and Lidziya Marozava were the defending champions, but Marozava chose not to participate.

Kerkhove partnered alongside Anna Blinkova and successfully defended her title, defeating Nao Hibino and Danka Kovinić in the final, 7–5, 6–4.

== Seeds ==
1. (Australia) Priscilla Hon / (Slovenia) Dalila Jakupović (semifinals)
2. (Russia) Anna Blinkova / (Netherlands) Lesley Kerkhove (champions)
3. (Russia) Valeria Savinykh / (Belgium) Maryna Zanevska (quarterfinals)
4. (China) Jiang Xinyu / (China) Tang Qianhui (semifinals)

== Draw ==
=== Key ===
- Q = Qualifier
- WC = Wild card
- LL = Lucky loser
- Alt = Alternate
- SE = Special exempt
- PR = Protected ranking
- ITF = ITF entry
- JE = Junior exempt
- w/o = Walkover
- r = Retired
- d = Defaulted
- SR = Special ranking

=== Draw ===
First round
1	(Australia) P Hon (Slovenia) D Jakupović	6	6
(China) X Gao (China) F Xun	4	4
WC	(China) S Chen (China) Y Sheng	2	1
WC	(China) Y Liu (China) M Wang	6	6
3	(Russia) V Savinykh (Belgium) M Zanevska	7^{7}	6
WC	(China) Z Sun (China) Y Yuan	6^{4}	2
(Japan) N Hibino (Montenegro) D Kovinić	7	6
(China) Jin Lu (India) P Thombare	5	2
(Greece) V Grammatikopoulou (Russia) P Monova	6	3	[7]
(India) A Raina (Belgium) K Zimmermann	1	6	[10]
(China) H Guo (China) Q Ye	6	3	[4]
4	(China) X Jiang (China) Q Tang	2	6	[10]
(Russia) A Kalinskaya (Germany) A Zaja	2	5
(Australia) L Cabrera (Thailand) L Kumkhum	6	7
(Romania) A Cadanțu (Slovakia) C Škamlová	4	4
2	(Russia) A Blinkova (Netherlands) L Kerkhove	6	6

Quarterfinals
1	(Australia) P Hon (Slovenia) D Jakupović	6	6
WC	(China) Y Liu (China) M Wang	0	0
3	(Russia) V Savinykh (Belgium) M Zanevska	2	4
(Japan) N Hibino (Montenegro) D Kovinić	6	6
(India) A Raina (Belgium) K Zimmermann	3	4
4	(China) X Jiang (China) Q Tang	6	6
(Australia) L Cabrera (Thailand) L Kumkhum	1	2
2	(Russia) A Blinkova (Netherlands) L Kerkhove	6	6

Semifinals
1	(Australia) P Hon (Slovenia) D Jakupović	7	2	[5]
(Japan) N Hibino (Montenegro) D Kovinić	5	6	[10]
4	(China) X Jiang (China) Q Tang	1	2
2	(Russia) A Blinkova (Netherlands) L Kerkhove	6	6

Final
(Japan) N Hibino (Montenegro) D Kovinić	5	4
2	(Russia) A Blinkova (Netherlands) L Kerkhove	7	6
