= 2018 Zhuhai Open =

Professional tennis tournament

- Date: 5–11 March
- Edition: 3rd (ATP); 4th (ITF)
- Category: ATP Challenger Tour; ITF Women's Circuit
- Prize money: $75,000+H (ATP) $60,000 (ITF)
- Surface: Hard
- Location: Zhuhai, China
- Venue: Hengqin International Tennis Center

Champions

Men's singles
- (Australia) Alex Bolt

Women's singles
- (Belgium) Maryna Zanevska

Men's doubles
- (Ukraine) Denys Molchanov / (Slovakia) Igor Zelenay

Women's doubles
- (Russia) Anna Blinkova / (Netherlands) Lesley Kerkhove
← 2017 ·	Zhuhai Open	· 2019 →

The 2018 Zhuhai Open was a professional tennis tournament played on hard courts. It was the third (ATP) and fourth (ITF) editions of the tournament and part of the 2018 ATP Challenger Tour and the 2018 ITF Women's Circuit. It took place at the Hengqin International Tennis Center in Zhuhai, China between 5 and 11 March 2018.

== Men's singles main-draw entrants ==
=== Seeds ===
Country	Player	Rank^{1}	Seed
AUS	Jordan Thompson	92	1
TUN	Malek Jaziri	117	2
ESP	Marcel Granollers	122	3
GER	Oscar Otte	134	4
GER	Yannick Maden	138	5
BLR	Ilya Ivashka	147	6
EST	Jürgen Zopp	148	7
RUS	Alexey Vatutin	152	8

- ^{1} Rankings are as of 26 February 2018.

=== Other entrants ===
The following players received wildcards into the singles main draw:

- (China) Li Zhe
- (China) Wu Di
- (China) Zhang Ze
- (China) Zhang Zhizhen

The following players received entry from the qualifying draw:

- (Australia) Maverick Banes
- (Australia) Alex Bolt
- (Japan) Yusuke Takahashi
- (China) Xia Zihao

== Women's singles main-draw entrants ==
=== Seeds ===
Country	Player	Rank^{1}	Seed
CZE	Denisa Allertová	88	1
JPN	Nao Hibino	90	2
THA	Luksika Kumkhum	98	3
SVK	Viktória Kužmová	109	4
~~CHN~~	~~Zheng Saisai~~	~~117~~	~~5~~
MNE	Danka Kovinić	121	6
JPN	Miyu Kato	127	7
SVK	Anna Karolína Schmiedlová	131	8

- ^{1} Rankings are as of 26 February 2018.

=== Other entrants ===
The following players received wildcards into the singles main draw:

- (China) Gao Xinyu
- (China) Jiang Xinyu
- (China) Tang Qianhui
- (China) Yuan Yue

The following players received entry from the qualifying draw:

- (China) Gai Ao
- (Italy) Jessica Pieri
- (Poland) Urszula Radwańska
- (China) Xun Fangying

The following player received entry as a lucky loser:

- (China) Feng Shuo

== Champions ==
=== Men's singles ===
- (Australia) Alex Bolt def. (Poland) Hubert Hurkacz, 5–7, 7–6^{(7–4)}, 6–2.

=== Women's singles ===
- (Belgium) Maryna Zanevska def. (Ukraine) Marta Kostyuk, 6–2, 6–4

=== Men's doubles ===
- (Ukraine) Denys Molchanov / (Slovakia) Igor Zelenay def. (Belarus) Aliaksandr Bury / (Chinese Taipei) Peng Hsien-yin, 7–5, 7–6^{(7–4)}.

=== Women's doubles ===
- (Russia) Anna Blinkova / (Netherlands) Lesley Kerkhove def. (Japan) Nao Hibino / (Montenegro) Danka Kovinić, 7–5, 6–4

== See also ==
- 2018 WTA Elite Trophy
