= 2017 Zhuhai Open – Women's singles =

Women's singles
- 2017 Zhuhai Open

Final
- Champion: (Czech Republic) Denisa Allertová
- Runner-up: (China) Zheng Saisai
- Score: 6–3, 2–6, 6–4

Events
Singles	men	women
Doubles	men	women
← 2016 ·	Zhuhai Open	· 2018 →

Olga Govortsova was the defending champion, but chose not to participate.

Denisa Allertová won the title, defeating Zheng Saisai 6–3, 2–6, 6–4 in the final.

== Seeds ==
1. (Chinese Taipei) Hsieh Su-wei (quarterfinals)
2. (Russia) Ekaterina Alexandrova (second round)
3. (China) Zhu Lin (first round)
4. (China) Zheng Saisai (final)
5. (Chinese Taipei) Chang Kai-chen (quarterfinals)
6. (Czech Republic) Denisa Allertová (champion)
7. (Belgium) Maryna Zanevska (semifinals)
8. (Serbia) Nina Stojanović (first round)

== Main draw ==
=== Key ===
- Q = Qualifier
- WC = Wild card
- LL = Lucky loser
- Alt = Alternate
- SE = Special exempt
- PR = Protected ranking
- ITF = ITF entry
- JE = Junior exempt
- w/o = Walkover
- r = Retired
- d = Defaulted
- SR = Special ranking

=== Finals ===
Semifinals
7	(Belgium) Maryna Zanevska	5	3
6	(Czech Republic) Denisa Allertová	7	6
4	(China) Zheng Saisai	6	6
(Tunisia) Ons Jabeur	1	2

Final
6	(Czech Republic) Denisa Allertová	6	2	6
4	(China) Zheng Saisai	3	6	4

=== Top half ===
First round
1	(Chinese Taipei) S-w Hsieh	6	6
(Turkey) İ Soylu	3	2
(United Kingdom) T Moore	7	1	6
Q	(China) H Tang	5	6	3
(Russia) A Kalinskaya	6^{2}	3
Q	(Switzerland) P Schnyder	7^{7}	6
(China) X Han	2	7	5
7	(Belgium) M Zanevska	6	5	7
3	(China) L Zhu	2	4
(Netherlands) A Rus	6	6
(China) F Liu	6	2	6
WC	(China) J Lu	4	6	2
(Australia) L Cabrera	3	5
(Slovenia) D Jakupović	6	7
(Kazakhstan) Z Diyas	4	3
6	(Czech Republic) D Allertová	6	6

Second round
1	(Chinese Taipei) S-w Hsieh	4	6	6
(United Kingdom) T Moore	6	1	1
Q	(Switzerland) P Schnyder	7	1	3
7	(Belgium) M Zanevska	5	6	6
(Netherlands) A Rus	6	6
(China) F Liu	4	4
(Slovenia) D Jakupović	4	2
6	(Czech Republic) D Allertová	6	6

Quarterfinals
1	(Chinese Taipei) S-w Hsieh	2	4
7	(Belgium) M Zanevska	6	6
(Netherlands) A Rus	4	3
6	(Czech Republic) D Allertová	6	6

Semifinals
7	(Belgium) M Zanevska	5	3
6	(Czech Republic) D Allertová	7	6

=== Bottom half ===
First round
8	(Serbia) N Stojanović	4	3
WC	(China) X Gao	6	6
Q	(Netherlands) L Kerkhove	7	2	2
(Switzerland) A Sadiković	5	6	6
WC	(China) Y Zhang	2	4
Q	(South Korea) N-l Han	6	6
(Belarus) A Sabalenka	5	3
4	(China) S Zheng	7	6
5	(Chinese Taipei) K-c Chang	6	6
WC	(China) F Xun	2	2
(China) K Zhang	3	6	6
(South Korea) S-j Jang	6	3	4
(Czech Republic) B Štefková	5	3
(Tunisia) O Jabeur	7	6
(Hungary) D Gálfi	6^{10}	4
2	(Russia) E Alexandrova	7^{12}	6

Second round
WC	(China) X Gao	7^{7}	3
(Switzerland) A Sadiković	6^{2}	0^{r}
Q	(South Korea) N-l Han	6^{9}	4
4	(China) S Zheng	7^{11}	6
5	(Chinese Taipei) K-c Chang	4	6	5
(China) K Zhang	6	2	0^{r}
(Tunisia) O Jabeur	6	2	6
2	(Russia) E Alexandrova	1	6	3

Quarterfinals
WC	(China) X Gao	2	1
4	(China) S Zheng	6	6
5	(Chinese Taipei) K-c Chang	4	5
(Tunisia) O Jabeur	6	7

Semifinals
4	(China) S Zheng	6	6
(Tunisia) O Jabeur	1	2
