= 2016 Zhuhai Challenger =

- Date: 7–13 March
- Edition: 1st
- Draw: 32S / 16D
- Prize money: $50,000+H
- Surface: Hard
- Location: Zhuhai, China

Champions

Singles
- (Italy) Thomas Fabbiano

Doubles
- (China) Gong Maoxin / (Chinese Taipei) Yi Chu-huan
| Zhuhai Challenger | · 2017 → |

The 2016 Zhuhai Challenger was a professional tennis tournament played on hard courts. It was the first edition of the tournament which was part of the 2016 ATP Challenger Tour. It took place in Zhuhai, China between 7 and 13 March 2016.

== Singles main-draw entrants ==
=== Seeds ===
| Country | Player | Rank^{1} | Seed |
|---|---|---|---|
| IND | Yuki Bhambri | 111 | 1 |
| GEO | Nikoloz Basilashvili | 118 | 2 |
| AUS | Jordan Thompson | 123 | 3 |
| ITA | Thomas Fabbiano | 126 | 4 |
| IND | Saketh Myneni | 156 | 5 |
| CRO | Franko Škugor | 163 | 6 |
| CHN | Wu Di | 172 | 7 |
| RUS | Alexander Kudryavtsev | 179 | 8 |

- ^{1} Rankings as of February 29, 2016.

=== Other entrants ===
The following players received wildcards into the singles main draw:

- (Turkey) Altuğ Çelikbilek
- (China) Gao Xin
- (China) Ouyang Bowen
- (China) Wang Chuhan

The following players received entry from the qualifying draw:

- (South Korea) Cheong-Eui Kim
- (Germany) Kevin Krawietz
- (Austria) Maximilian Neuchrist
- (Italy) Lorenzo Sonego

== Champions ==
=== Singles ===
- (Italy) Thomas Fabbiano def. (China) Zhang Ze, 5–7, 6–1, 6–3

=== Doubles ===
- (China) Gong Maoxin / (Chinese Taipei) Yi Chu-huan def. (Chinese Taipei) Hsieh Cheng-peng / (China) Wu Di, 2–6, 6–1, [10–5]
