= 2019 Zhuhai Open – Singles =

Singles
- 2019 Zhuhai Open

Final
- Champion: (Spain) Enrique López Pérez
- Runner-up: (Russia) Evgeny Karlovskiy
- Score: 6–1, 6–4

Events
Singles	Doubles
- Zhuhai Open

Alex Bolt was the defending champion but chose not to defend his title.

Enrique López Pérez won the title after defeating Evgeny Karlovskiy 6–1, 6–4 in the final.

== Seeds ==
All seeds receive a bye into the second round.

1. (Canada) Brayden Schnur (second round)
2. (Cyprus) Marcos Baghdatis (quarterfinals)
3. (Germany) Oscar Otte (third round)
4. (Japan) Hiroki Moriya (quarterfinals)
5. (Israel) Dudi Sela (third round, retired)
6. (Germany) Rudolf Molleker (second round)
7. (Kazakhstan) Aleksandr Nedovyesov (second round)
8. (Germany) Mats Moraing (second round)
9. (Austria) Jurij Rodionov (second round)
10. (China) Zhang Ze (semifinals)
11. (Slovenia) Blaž Rola (third round)
12. (Australia) Marc Polmans (second round)
13. (Croatia) Viktor Galović (second round)
14. (Egypt) Mohamed Safwat (quarterfinals)
15. (Argentina) Pedro Cachin (second round)
16. (Brazil) Guilherme Clezar (third round)

== Draw ==
Key

- Q = Qualifier
- WC = Wild card
- LL = Lucky loser
- Alt = Alternate
- ITF = ITF entry
- PR = Protected ranking
- SR = Special ranking
- SE = Special exempt
- JE = Junior exempt
- JR = Junior Accelerator Programme entrant
- CO = College Accelerator Programme entrant
- NG = Next Gen Accelerator Program entrant
- w/o = Walkover
- r = Retired
- d = Defaulted

=== Finals ===
Quarterfinals
14	(Egypt) Mohamed Safwat	7	3	6^{4}
(Spain) Enrique López Pérez	5	6	7^{7}
(China) Wu Yibing	3^{r}
(Japan) Kaichi Uchida	5
(Russia) Evgeny Karlovskiy	6	2	6
4	(Japan) Hiroki Moriya	2	6	2
10	(China) Zhang Ze	6	3	6
2	(Cyprus) Marcos Baghdatis	2	6	2

Semifinals
(Spain) Enrique López Pérez	6	6
(Japan) Kaichi Uchida	4	2
(Russia) Evgeny Karlovskiy	7^{10}	7^{7}
10	(China) Zhang Ze	6^{8}	6^{3}

Final
(Spain) Enrique López Pérez	6	6
(Russia) Evgeny Karlovskiy	1	4

=== Top half ===
==== Section 1 ====
First round
WC	(China) Xia Zihao	7^{7}	5	1
(Australia) M Purcell	6^{3}	7	6
ITF	(Egypt) K-M Maamoun	3	2
(Dominican Republic) J Hernández-Fernández	6	6
ITF	(France) Baptiste Crepatte	6	7^{7}
(South Korea) D-h Lee	3	6^{4}
(India) S Myneni	4	6	4
(Spain) E López Pérez	6	4	6

Second round
1	(Canada) B Schnur	6	3	6^{7}
(Australia) M Purcell	1	6	7^{9}
(Dominican Republic) J Hernández-Fernández	4	6^{5}
14	(Egypt) M Safwat	6	7^{7}
11	(Slovenia) B Rola	7	6^{3}	7
ITF	(France) B Crepatte	5	7^{7}	5
(Spain) E López Pérez	7^{7}	6
6	(Germany) R Molleker	6^{4}	4

Third round
(Australia) M Purcell	2	2
14	(Egypt) M Safwat	6	6
11	(Slovenia) B Rola	6^{6}	1
(Spain) E López Pérez	7^{8}	6

Quarterfinals
14	(Egypt) M Safwat	7	3	6^{4}
(Spain) E López Pérez	5	6	7^{7}

==== Section 2 ====
First round
(Japan) Renta Tokuda	6	6
(Australia) M Banes	4	2
WC	(China) Zh Zhang	2	6^{6}
(China) Y Wu	6	7^{8}
(Japan) K Uchida	6	7^{7}
(Portugal) G Oliveira	3	6^{1}
(Australia) L Saville	2	1
(Serbia) D Petrović	6	6

Second round
3	(Germany) O Otte	7^{7}	6
(Japan) R Tokuda	6^{2}	1
(China) Y Wu	4	7	6
15	(Argentina) P Cachin	6	5	2
12	(Australia) M Polmans	2	4
(Japan) K Uchida	6	6
(Serbia) D Petrović	3	6	6
7	(Kazakhstan) A Nedovyesov	6	4	2

Third round
3	(Germany) O Otte	6	6^{6}	6^{5}
(China) Y Wu	0	7^{8}	7^{7}
(Japan) K Uchida	7^{7}	3	6
(Serbia) D Petrović	6^{5}	6	4

Quarterfinals
(China) Y Wu	3^{r}
(Japan) K Uchida	5

=== Bottom half ===
==== Section 3 ====
First round
(Canada) F Peliwo	3	0
(Belarus) U Ignatik	6	6
(Russia) E Karlovskiy	6	6
WC	(China) Y He	2	3
WC	(China) R Hua	7	3	6
(Serbia) N Serdarušić	5	6	4
ITF	(Spain) J Barranco Cosano	1	2
(Australia) A Harris	6	6

Second round
8	(Germany) M Moraing	2	3
(Belarus) U Ignatik	6	6
(Russia) E Karlovskiy	6	7^{7}
9	(Austria) J Rodionov	4	6^{2}
16	(Brazil) G Clezar	6	4	7
WC	(China) R Hua	2	6	5
(Australia) A Harris	4	1
4	(Japan) H Moriya	6	6

Third round
(Belarus) U Ignatik	6	5	3
(Russia) E Karlovskiy	2	7	6
16	(Brazil) G Clezar	3	4
4	(Japan) H Moriya	6	6

Quarterfinals
(Russia) E Karlovskiy	6	2	6
4	(Japan) H Moriya	2	6	2

==== Section 4 ====
First round
(China) D Wu	6^{3}	2
ITF	(Italy) R Brancaccio	7^{7}	6
(China) Z Li	7	7
Q	(China) Y Bai	5	5
(South Korea) Y-s Chung	7	6
Q	(Finland) H Heliövaara	5	2
WC	(China) X Gao	5	4
(Slovakia) A Molčan	7	6

Second round
5	(Israel) D Sela	6	7
ITF	(Italy) R Brancaccio	4	5
(China) Z Li	3	4
10	(China) Ze Zhang	6	6
13	(Croatia) V Galović	3	4
(South Korea) Y-s Chung	6	6
(Slovakia) A Molčan	5	6	2
2	(Cyprus) M Baghdatis	7	3	6

Third round
5	(Israel) D Sela	2^{r}
10	(China) Ze Zhang	1
(South Korea) Y-s Chung	4	2
2	(Cyprus) M Baghdatis	6	6

Quarterfinals
10	(China) Ze Zhang	6	3	6
2	(Cyprus) M Baghdatis	2	6	2
