= International Challenger Quanzhou =

- 2017 International Challenger Quanzhou

ATP Challenger Tour
- Event name: International Challenger Quanzhou
- Location: Quanzhou, China
- Venue: Blossom Garden Tennis Center
- Category: ATP Challenger Tour
- Surface: Hard
- Draw: 32S/32Q/16D
- Prize money: $50,000 + H

The International Challenger Quanzhou was a professional tennis tournament played on hardcourts. It was part of the ATP Challenger Tour. It was held in Quanzhou, China in 2017.

== Past finals ==
=== Singles ===
Year	Champion	Runner-up	Score
2017	(Italy) Thomas Fabbiano	(Italy) Matteo Berrettini	7–6^{(7–5)}, 7–6^{(9–7)}

=== Doubles ===
Year	Champions	Runners-up	Score
2017	(Chinese Taipei) Hsieh Cheng-peng (Chinese Taipei) Peng Hsien-yin	(Germany) Andre Begemann (Belarus) Aliaksandr Bury	3–6, 6–4, [10–7]
