= Li Hanwen =

Chinese tennis player

Li Hanwen 李翰文
- Country (sports): China
- Residence: Jiangsu, Yangzhou, China
- Born: 22 August 2002 (age 24) Jiangsu, China
- Height: 1.80 m (5 ft 11 in)
- Plays: Right-handed (two-handed backhand)
- Coach: Wei Zhang
- Prize money: $56,417

Singles
- Career record: 0–0
- Career titles: 0
- Highest ranking: No. 524 (15 August 2022)

Doubles
- Career record: 0–1
- Career titles: 0
- Highest ranking: No. 622 (13 June 2022)

Li Hanwen
- Simplified Chinese: 李翰文
- Traditional Chinese: 李漢文
Transcriptions
Standard Mandarin
- Hanyu Pinyin: Lǐ Hànwén

Li Hanwen (Chinese: 李翰文; pinyin: Lǐ Hànwén; born 22 August 2002) is a Chinese tennis player.

Li has a career high ATP singles ranking of World No. 524 achieved on 15 August 2022 and a career high doubles ranking of World No. 622 achieved on 13 June 2022.

== Career ==
Li has reached his first and presently only career final at the M15 Sharm El Sheikh, Egypt World Tennis Tour tournament on hard courts in April 2021 in the doubles. He and Brazilian partner Oscar José Gutierrez had to withdraw from the final, handing the title over to opponents Ryan Nijboer and Neil Oberleitner.

Li made his ATP Tour debut at the 2021 Geneva Open where he has been given a wildcard entry into the main doubles draw alongside Arthur Cazaux of France. They lost to veteran players Marin Čilić and Andrey Golubev in the first round. He also received a wildcard entry into the qualifying draw for the singles portion of the tournament, but he lost in the first round to Ilya Ivashka of Belarus in straight sets 0–6, 3–6.

== ATP Challenger and ITF Futures finals ==
=== Singles: 3 (3–0) ===
| Legend ATP Challenger (0–0) ITF World Tennis Tour (3–0) | Finals by surface Hard (3–0) Clay (0–0) Grass (0–0) Carpet (0–0) |

| Result | W–L | Date | Tournament | Tier | Surface | Opponent | Score |
|---|---|---|---|---|---|---|---|
| Win | 1–0 | Oct 2021 | M15 Doha, Qatar | World Tennis Tour | Hard | (United Kingdom) Julian Cash | 6–4, 6–3 |
| Win | 2–0 | Jun 2023 | M25 Luzhou, China | World Tennis Tour | Hard | (China) Liu Hanyiu | 6–4, 6–2 |
| Win | 3–0 | Jul 2023 | M25 Fuzhou, China | World Tennis Tour | Hard | (China) Wang Xiaofei | 6–2, 6–3 |

=== Doubles: 6 (3–3) ===
| Legend ATP Challenger (0–0) ITF Futures (3–3) | Finals by surface Hard (3–3) Clay (0–0) Grass (0–0) Carpet (0–0) |

| Result | W–L | Date | Tournament | Tier | Surface | Partner | Opponents | Score |
|---|---|---|---|---|---|---|---|---|
| Loss | 0–1 | Apr 2021 | M15 Sharm El Sheikh, Egypt | World Tennis Tour | Hard | (Brazil) Oscar José Gutierrez | (Netherlands) Ryan Nijboer (Austria) Neil Oberleitner | walkover |
| Loss | 0–2 | Oct 2021 | M15 Doha, Qatar | World Tennis Tour | Hard | (Kazakhstan) Beibit Zhukayev | (United Kingdom) Julian Cash (Denmark) Christian Sigsgaard | 3–6, 3–6 |
| Win | 1–2 | Oct 2021 | M15 Doha, Qatar | World Tennis Tour | Hard | (China) Tao Mu | (Sweden) Simon Freund (Germany) Niklas Schell | walkover |
| Win | 2–2 | Jan 2022 | M15 Monastir, Tunisia | World Tennis Tour | Hard | (China) Bu Yunchaokete | (Russia) Kirill Mishkin (Russia) Vitali Shvets | 6–3, 6–2 |
| Loss | 2–3 | Mar 2022 | M15 Monastir, Tunisia | World Tennis Tour | Hard | (China) Tao Mu | (North Macedonia) Gorazd Srbljak (Germany) Paul Woerner | 6–1, 6–7^{(2–7)}, [8–10] |
| Win | 3–3 | Mar 2022 | M15 Monastir, Tunisia | World Tennis Tour | Hard | (Argentina) Mateo Nicolas Martinez | (Tunisia) Aziz Dougaz (Luxembourg) Alex Knaff | 6–1, 2–6, [10–8] |
