= Thomas Fabbiano =

Italian tennis player (born 1989)

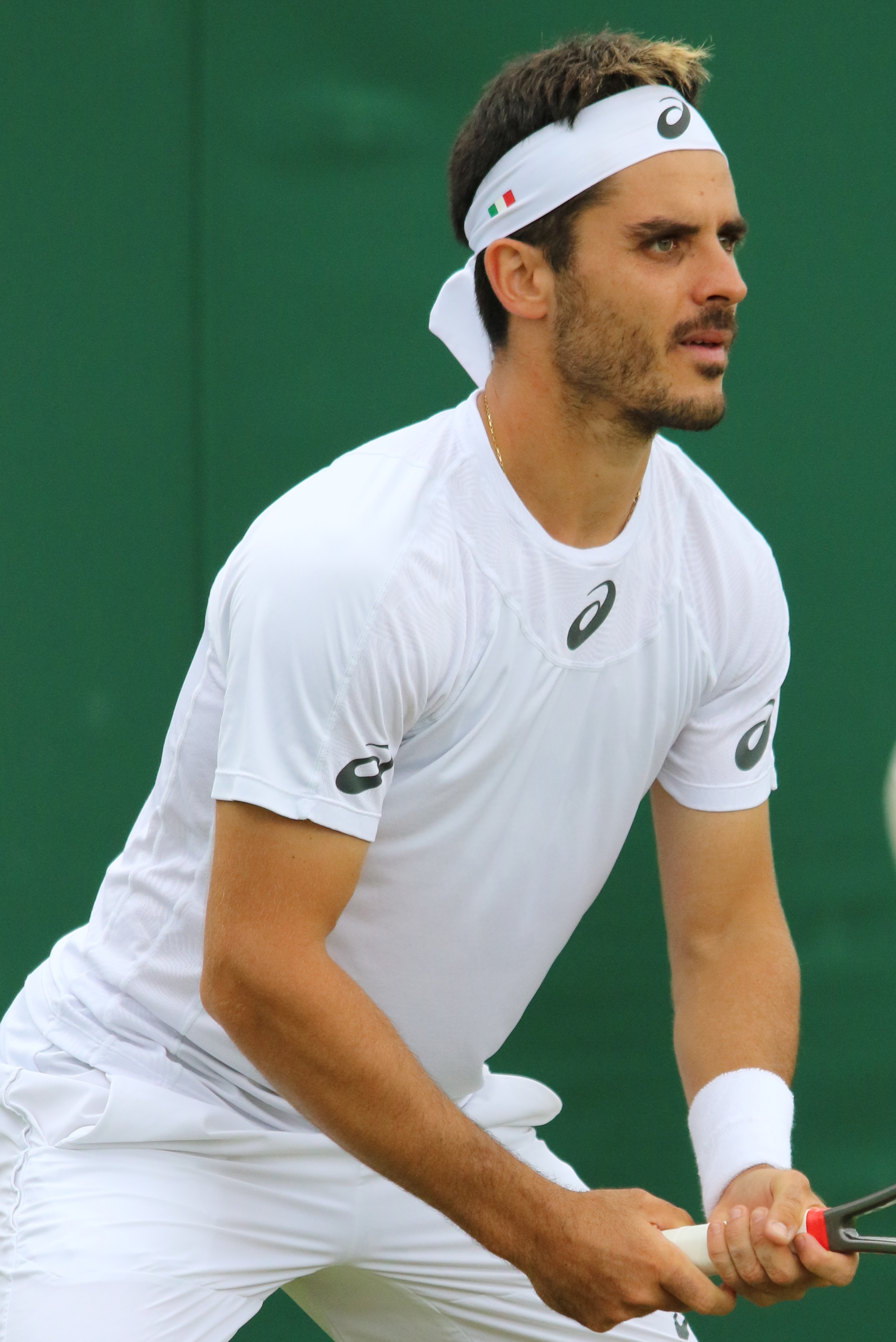
- Fabbiano at the 2017 Wimbledon Championships
- Country (sports): Italy
- Residence: San Giorgio Ionico, Italy
- Born: 26 May 1989 (age 36); Grottaglie, Italy
- Height: 1.73 m (5 ft 8 in)
- Turned pro: 2005
- Retired: 2023
- Plays: Right-handed (two handed backhand)
- Prize money: US$2,258,656

Singles
- Career record: 27–63
- Career titles: 0
- Highest ranking: No. 70 (18 September 2017)

Grand Slam singles results
- Australian Open: 3R (2019)
- French Open: 2R (2018)
- Wimbledon: 3R (2018, 2019)
- US Open: 3R (2017)

Doubles
- Career record: 5–15
- Career titles: 0
- Highest ranking: No. 208 (20 July 2009)

Grand Slam doubles results
- Australian Open: 1R (2018)
- US Open: 1R (2017)
- Last updated on: 17 March 2023.

Thomas Fabbiano (born 26 May 1989) is an Italian former tennis player who played mostly on the ATP Challenger Tour. On 11 September 2017, he reached his then-highest ATP singles ranking of 70. His highest doubles ranking was 208 on 20 July 2009.

He reached his first third round at a Grand Slam tournament at the US Open 2017 where he was defeated by fellow Italian Paolo Lorenzi. Since then he reached the second round or better at each of the Grand Slams including the 2019 Wimbledon Championships where he stunned seventh seed Stefanos Tsitsipas in the first round.

== Junior grand slam finals ==
=== Doubles finals: 1 (1–0) ===
Outcome	Year	Tournament	Surface	Partnering	Opponents in the final	Score
Winner	2007	French Open	Clay	(Belarus) Andrei Karatchenia	(United States) Kellen Damico (France) Jonathan Eysseric	6–4, 6–0

== ATP Challenger and ITF Futures finals ==
=== Singles: 25 (17–8) ===
Legend ATP Challengers (6–1) ITF Futures (11–7)	Titles by surface Hard (11–2) Grass (0–0) Clay (6-6) Carpet (0–0)

Result	W–L	Date	Tournament	Tier	Surface	Opponent	Score
Loss	0-1	Jul 2007	Italy F24, Modena	Futures	Clay	(Switzerland) Cristian Villagran	0–6, 1–6
Win	1-1	Sep 2007	Italy F32, Olbia	Futures	Clay	(Italy) Massimo Dell'Acqua	4–6, 7–5, 7–6^{(7–4)}
Win	2-1	Apr 2008	Italy F9, Francavilla	Futures	Clay	(Romania) Victor Ioniță	6–2, 6–2
Win	3-1	Aug 2008	Italy F24, La Spezia	Futures	Clay	(Italy) Marco Viola	6–4, 6–2
Win	4-1	Oct 2008	Italy F34, Quartu Sant'Elena	Futures	Clay	(Italy) Leonardo Azzaro	6–2, 4–6, 6–2
Loss	4-2	Feb 2010	Israel F3, Eilat	Futures	Hard	(Slovakia) Miloslav Mečíř	4–6, 6–7^{(6–8)}
Loss	4-3	Mar 2010	Turkey F2, Antalya	Futures	Clay	(Slovakia) Pavol Červenák	6–3, 6–4
Win	5-3	Aug 2010	Italy F19, La Spezia	Futures	Clay	(Italy) Francesco Aldi	6–0, 5–7, 6–3
Loss	5-4	Jun 2011	Romania F2, Bacău	Futures	Clay	(Romania) Victor Ioniță	6–7^{(4–7)}, 0–4^{r}
Loss	5-5	Jul 2011	Italy F17, Sassuolo	Futures	Clay	(Australia) James Duckworth	1–6, 2–6
Win	6-5	Jul 2011	Italy F18, Modena	Futures	Clay	(France) Laurent Rochette	6–4, 6–4
Win	7-5	Dec 2011	Turkey F35, Antalya	Futures	Hard	(Germany) Stefan Seifert	6–2, 6–1
Win	8-5	Mar 2012	Usa F6, Harlingen	Futures	Hard	(Canada) Peter Polansky	6–1, 4–6, 6–3
Loss	8-6	May 2013	Italy F9, Bergamo	Futures	Clay	(Italy) Matteo Trevisan	4–6, 4–6
Loss	8-7	Jun 2013	Italy F11, Parma	Futures	Clay	(Italy) Riccardo Bellotti	2–6, 2–6
Win	9-7	Jul 2013	Recanati, Italy	Challenger	Hard	(France) David Guez	6–0, 6–3
Win	10-7	Mar 2015	Tunisia F9, El Kantaoui	Futures	Hard	(Brazil) Henrique Cunha	6–3, 6–4
Win	11-7	Mar 2015	Tunisia F10, El Kantaoui	Futures	Hard	(Bulgaria) Alexandar Lazov	7–6^{(7–2)}, 4–6, 6–1
Win	12-7	Mar 2015	Tunisia F11, El Kantaoui	Futures	Hard	(Bulgaria) Alexandar Lazov	6–3, 6–1
Win	13-7	Mar 2016	Zhuhai, China	Challenger	Hard	(China) Ze Zhang	5-7, 6–1, 6-3
Loss	13-8	Mar 2017	Zhuhai, China	Challenger	Hard	(Russia) Evgeny Donskoy	3–6, 4–6
Win	14-8	Mar 2017	Quanzhou, China	Challenger	Hard	(Italy) Matteo Berrettini	7–6^{(7–5)}, 7–6^{(9–7)}
Win	15-8	May 2017	Gimcheon, South Korea	Challenger	Hard	(Russia) Teymuraz Gabashvili	7–5, 6-1
Win	16-8	May 2017	Seoul, South Korea	Challenger	Hard	(South Korea) Kwon Soon-woo	1-6, 6–4, 6-3
Win	17-8	Oct 2018	Ningbo, China	Challenger	Hard	(India) Prajnesh Gunneswaran	7–6^{(7–4)}, 4–6, 6–3

=== Doubles ===
Legend ATP Challengers (3–4) ITF Futures (5–7)	Titles by surface Hard (0–1) Grass (0–0) Clay (3–3) Carpet (0–0)

Outcome	No.	Date	Tournament	Surface	Partner	Opponents	Score
Winner	1.	24 August 2008	Manerbio, Italy	Clay	(Serbia) Boris Pašanski	(Italy) Massimo Dell'Acqua (Italy) Alessio di Mauro	7–6, 7–5
Winners	2.	11 July 2010	San Benedetto, Italy	Clay	(Spain) Gabriel Trujillo-Soler	(Italy) Francesco Aldi (Italy) Daniele Giorgini	7–6^{(7–4)}, 7–6^{(7–5)}
Winners	3.	15 August 2010	Trani, Italy	Clay	(Italy) Matteo Trevisan	(Italy) Daniele Bracciali (Italy) Filippo Volandri	6–2, 7–5
Runners-up	4.	16 April 2011	Rome, Italy	Clay	(Italy) Walter Trusendi	(Slovakia) Martin Kližan (Italy) Alessandro Motti	6–7^{(3–7)}, 4–6
Runners-up	5.	24 September 2011	İzmir, Turkey	Hard	(Italy) Flavio Cipolla	(United States) Travis Rettenmaier (Germany) Simon Stadler	0–6, 2–6
Runners-up	6.	15 July 2012	Bogotá, Colombia	Clay	(Italy) Riccardo Ghedin	(Brazil) Marcelo Demoliner (Dominican Republic) Víctor Estrella	4–6, 2–6
Runners-up	7.	12 April 2014	Mersin, Colombia	Clay	(Italy) Matteo Viola	(Moldova) Radu Albot (Czech Republic) Jaroslav Pospíšil	6–7^{(7–9)}, 1–6

== Performance timelines ==
=== Singles ===
Key
W	F	SF	QF	#R	RR	Q#	P#	DNQ	A	Z#	PO	G	S	B	NMS	NTI	P	NH

(W) winner; (F) finalist; (SF) semifinalist; (QF) quarterfinalist; (#R) rounds 4, 3, 2, 1; (RR) round-robin stage; (Q#) qualification round; (P#) preliminary round; (DNQ) did not qualify; (A) absent; (Z#) Davis/Fed Cup Zonal Group (with number indication) or (PO) play-off; (G) gold, (S) silver or (B) bronze Olympic/Paralympic medal; (NMS) not a Masters tournament; (NTI) not a Tier I tournament; (P) postponed; (NH) not held; (SR) strike rate (events won / competed); (W–L) win–loss record.
To avoid confusion and double counting, these charts are updated at the conclusion of a tournament or when the player's participation has ended.

Current through the 2022 Australian Open.

Tournament	2013	2014	2015	2016	2017	2018	2019	2020	2021	2022	W–L
Grand Slam tournaments
Australian Open	Q2	Q1	Q1	Q2	1R	1R	3R	Q1	Q1	Q3	2–3
French Open	A	Q1	Q2	1R	Q1	2R	1R	A	Q2	Q1	1–3
Wimbledon	A	Q1	Q1	Q3	1R	3R	3R	NH	Q1	Q1	4–3
US Open	1R	Q1	Q3	1R	3R	Q2	2R	A	Q1		3–4
Win–loss	0–1	0–0	0–0	0–2	2–3	3–3	5–4	0–0	0–0	0–0	10–13

== Wins over top 10 players ==
#	Player	Rank	Event	Surface	Rd	Score	TF Rank
2019
1.	(Greece) Stefanos Tsitsipas	6	Wimbledon, United Kingdom	Grass	1R	6–4, 3–6, 6–4, 6–7^{(8–10)}, 6–3	89
2.	(Austria) Dominic Thiem	4	US Open, United States	Hard	1R	6–4, 3–6, 6–3, 6–2	87
