= Gong Maoxin =

Chinese tennis player

Gong Maoxin 公茂鑫
- Country (sports): China
- Residence: Nanjing, China
- Born: August 24, 1987 (age 38) Nanjing, China
- Height: 1.78 m (5 ft 10 in)
- Turned pro: 2006
- Retired: 2023
- Plays: Right-handed
- Prize money: US$ 407,547

Singles
- Career record: 2–6
- Career titles: 0
- Highest ranking: No. 294 (31 January 2011)

Doubles
- Career record: 18–38
- Career titles: 0
- Highest ranking: No. 82 (18 March 2019)

Grand Slam doubles results
- Australian Open: 2R (2019)
Medal record
Representing China
Men's tennis
Asian Games
Silver medal – second place	2010 Guangzhou	Doubles
Silver medal – second place	2014 Incheon	Team Event

Gong Maoxin (Chinese: 公茂鑫; pinyin: Gōng Màoxīn; Mandarin pronunciation: [kʊ́ŋ mâʊ ɕín]; born August 24, 1987) is a Chinese former professional tennis player. He has a career-high ATP doubles ranking of No. 82 achieved on 18 March 2019 and a singles ranking of No. 294 achieved on 31 January 2011.

== Challenger and Futures finals ==
=== Singles: 11 (5–6) ===
Legend (singles) ATP Challenger Tour (0–0) ITF Futures Tour (5–6)	Titles by surface Hard (5–6) Clay (0–0) Grass (0–0) Carpet (0–0)

Result	W–L	Date	Tournament	Tier	Surface	Opponent	Score
Win	1–0	Apr 2008	China F3, Taizhou	Futures	Hard	(China) Li Zhe	6–4, 7–5
Loss	1–1	Sep 2008	Japan F8, Osaka	Futures	Hard	(Japan) Junn Mitsuhashi	6–7^{(2–7)}, 6–2, 5–7
Win	2–1	May 2009	China F3, Taizhou	Futures	Hard	(China) Zhang Ze	6–3, 4–6, 6–4
Loss	2–2	May 2009	China F4, Wuhan	Futures	Hard	(China) Zeng Shaoxuan	0–6, 1–6
Loss	2–3	Apr 2010	China F4, Guiyang	Futures	Hard	(China) Li Zhe	4–6, 3–6
Loss	2–4	Jun 2010	China F6, Jiaxing	Futures	Hard	(China) Wu Di	5–7, 7–5, 4–6
Loss	2–5	Oct 2010	China F8, Shanghai	Futures	Hard	(China) Bai Yan	3–6, 2–6
Win	3–5	Jan 2011	China F2, Mengzi	Futures	Hard	(China) Zhang Ze	6–1, 6–7^{(3–7)}, 6–2
Loss	3–6	Jun 2011	China F8, Huizhou	Futures	Hard	(South Korea) Lim Yong-kyu	7–6^{(8–6)}, 4–6, 1–6
Win	4–6	Jul 2012	China F10, Shenyang	Futures	Hard	(China) Wu Di	6–4, 6–3
Win	5–6	Sep 2012	Vietnam F6, Bình Dương	Futures	Hard	(Chinese Taipei) Huang Liang-chi	6–2, 7–6^{(7–5)}

=== Doubles: 73 (42–31) ===
Legend (doubles) ATP Challenger Tour (17–17) ITF Futures Tour (25–14)	Titles by surface Hard (40–25) Clay (1–5) Grass (0–1) Carpet (1–0)

Result	W–L	Date	Tournament	Tier	Surface	Partner	Opponents	Score
Loss	0–1	Oct 2006	Japan F11, Kashiwa	Futures	Hard	(China) Yu Xinyuan	(United States) Minh Le (Japan) Hiroyasu Sato	6–7^{(1–7)}, 3–6
Win	1–1	May 2007	China F2, Tianjin	Futures	Hard	(China) Li Zhe	(Chinese Taipei) Chang Huai-en (Chinese Taipei) Lee Hsin-han	6–3, 3–6, 6–1
Win	2–1	May 2007	China F3, Beijing	Futures	Hard	(China) Li Zhe	(Australia) Matthew Ebden (New Zealand) Jose Statham	0–6, 6–3, 7–5
Win	3–1	Aug 2007	Spain F30, Bakio	Futures	Hard	(China) Xu Junchao	(United Kingdom) Richard Brooks (Spain) Juan-Miguel Such-Pérez	6–2, 6–3
Loss	3–2	Nov 2007	China F8, Wuxi	Futures	Hard	(China) Li Zhe	(Netherlands) Antal van der Duim (Netherlands) Boy Westerhof	6–7^{(5–7)}, 4–6
Loss	3–3	Mar 2008	Thailand F3, Nonthaburi	Futures	Hard	(Japan) Norikazu Sugiyama	(Indonesia) Christopher Rungkat (United States) Nathan Thompson	2–6, 4–6
Loss	3–4	Mar 2008	Japan F1, Tokyo	Futures	Hard	(China) Li Zhe	(Japan) Hiroki Kondo (Japan) Hiroyasu Sato	6–3, 6–7^{(3–7)}, [2–10]
Win	4–4	Apr 2008	Japan F3, Kōfu	Futures	Hard	(China) Li Zhe	(New Zealand) G.D. Jones (New Zealand) Daniel King-Turner	6–1, 7–5
Loss	4–5	May 2008	Korea Rep. F4, Seogwipo	Futures	Hard	(China) Li Zhe	(Japan) Yaoki Ishii (Japan) Hiroki Kondo	4–6, 5–7
Win	5–5	Jun 2008	Japan F6, Akishima	Futures	Carpet	(China) Li Zhe	(China) Wang Yu jr. (China) Xu Junchao	6–4, 3–6, [10–7]
Win	6–5	Jul 2008	Japan F7, Ariake	Futures	Hard	(China) Li Zhe	(United States) Minh Le (Chinese Taipei) Lee Hsin-han	6–2, 6–1
Win	7–5	Sep 2008	Japan F8, Osaka	Futures	Hard	(China) Li Zhe	(Japan) Hiroki Kondo (Japan) Hiroyasu Sato	6–4, 6–3
Loss	7–6	Mar 2009	New Zealand F1, Auckland	Futures	Hard	(China) Yu Xinyuan	(New Zealand) G.D. Jones (New Zealand) Daniel King-Turner	3–6, 4–6
Loss	7–7	Mar 2009	New Zealand F2, Hamilton	Futures	Hard	(China) Yu Xinyuan	(Australia) Miles Armstrong (Australia) Adam Feeney	2–6, 6–7^{(4–7)}
Loss	7–8	May 2009	China F3, Taizhou	Futures	Hard	(China) Zeng Shaoxuan	(China) Lu Hao (China) Xu Junchao	7–6^{(7–3)}, 4–6, [4–10]
Win	8–8	Aug 2009	China F6, Jiaxing	Futures	Hard	(China) Xue Feng	(China) Zeng Shaoxuan (China) Zhang Ze	6–7^{(4–7)}, 7–6^{(7–5)}, [10–7]
Loss	8–9	Aug 2009	China F7, Ningbo	Futures	Hard	(China) Xue Feng	(China) Li Zhe (China) Wang Yu jr.	6–4, 1–6, [6–10]
Win	9–9	Sep 2009	France F13, Bagnères-de-Bigorre	Futures	Hard	(China) Zhang Ze	(France) Fabrice Martin (Canada) Adil Shamasdin	6–4, 6–4
Loss	9–10	Feb 2010	Azerbaijan F1, Baku	Futures	Hard (i)	(China) Li Zhe	(Romania) Petru-Alexandru Luncanu (Netherlands) Matwé Middelkoop	7–6^{(9–7)}, 3–6, [10–12]
Loss	9–11	Apr 2010	China F3, Chongqing	Futures	Hard	(China) Li Zhe	(China) Wu Di (China) Zhang Ze	3–6, 6–1, [8–10]
Win	10–11	Apr 2010	China F4, Guiyang	Futures	Hard	(China) Li Zhe	(Chinese Taipei) Chang Yao-lun (South Korea) Daniel Yoo	5–7, 6–3, [10–4]
Loss	10–12	Apr 2010	Korea F3, Changwon	Futures	Hard	(China) Li Zhe	(Austria) Nikolaus Moser (Austria) Max Raditschnigg	2–6, 6–2, [5–10]
Loss	10–13	May 2010	Fergana, Uzbekistan	Challenger	Hard	(China) Li Zhe	(United States) Brendan Evans (Japan) Toshihide Matsui	6–3, 3–6, [8–10]
Win	11–13	Jun 2010	China F5, Wuhan	Futures	Hard	(China) Li Zhe	(China) Ma Yanan (China) Yu Xinyuan	7–5, 6–3
Win	12–13	Jun 2010	China F6, Jiaxing	Futures	Hard	(China) Li Zhe	(China) Gao Peng (China) Gao Wan	6–4, 6–3
Win	13–13	Aug 2010	Karshi, Uzbekistan	Challenger	Hard	(China) Li Zhe	(India) Divij Sharan (India) Vishnu Vardhan	6–3, 6–1
Win	14–13	Sep 2010	Bangkok, Thailand	Challenger	Hard	(China) Li Zhe	(India) Yuki Bhambri (United States) Ryler DeHeart	6–3, 6–4
Win	15–13	Oct 2010	China F8, Shanghai	Futures	Hard	(China) Li Zhe	(Finland) Harri Heliövaara (New Zealand) Jose Statham	7–6^{(7–3)}, 7–6^{(8–6)}
Win	16–13	Jan 2011	China F1, Mengzi	Futures	Hard	(China) Li Zhe	(Chinese Taipei) Lee Hsin-han (Chinese Taipei) Yi Chu-huan	6–1, 6–1
Win	17–13	Jan 2011	China F2, Mengzi	Futures	Hard	(China) Li Zhe	(Chinese Taipei) Lee Hsin-han (Chinese Taipei) Yi Chu-huan	4–6, 6–3, [10–4]
Win	18–13	Apr 2011	China F3, Chengdu	Futures	Hard	(China) Li Zhe	(Chinese Taipei) Chen Ti (China) Xu Junchao	6–0, 6–3
Win	19–13	Apr 2011	China F4, Chengdu	Futures	Hard	(China) Li Zhe	(South Korea) Im Kyu-tae (Japan) Hiroki Kondo	6–3, 7–6^{(7–4)}
Win	20–13	Jun 2011	China F7, Shenzhen	Futures	Hard	(China) Li Zhe	(South Korea) Jun Woong-sun (South Korea) Daniel Yoo	6–0, 6–3
Win	21–13	Jun 2011	China F8, Huizhou	Futures	Hard	(China) Li Zhe	(China) Gao Peng (China) Gao Wan	6–4, 6–2
Win	22–13	Jul 2011	Canada F3, Mississauga	Futures	Hard	(China) Li Zhe	(United States) Peter Aarts (Canada) Daniel Chu	6–4, 7–6^{(7–1)}
Loss	22–14	May 2012	China F7, Zhangjiagang	Futures	Hard	(China) Xue Feng	(South Korea) Nam Ji-sung (South Korea) Noh Sang-woo	2–6, 4–6
Loss	22–15	Sep 2012	Ningbo, China, P.R.	Challenger	Hard	(China) Zhang Ze	(Thailand) Sanchai Ratiwatana (Thailand) Sonchat Ratiwatana	4–6, 2–6
Loss	22–16	Mar 2013	Kazakhstan F2, Aktobe	Futures	Hard (i)	(China) Zhang Ze	(Russia) Victor Baluda (Croatia) Mate Pavić	2–6, 3–6
Win	23–16	Apr 2013	China F2, Chengdu	Futures	Hard	(China) Zeng Shaoxuan	(Japan) Hiroki Moriya (Japan) Yasutaka Uchiyama	6–7^{(4–7)}, 6–3, [10–8]
Loss	23–17	Jul 2013	Beijing, China, P.R.	Challenger	Hard	(China) Zhang Ze	(Japan) Toshihide Matsui (Thailand) Danai Udomchoke	6–4, 6–7^{(6–8)}, [8–10]
Win	24–17	Apr 2014	China F4, Chengdu	Futures	Hard	(China) Li Zhe	(Chinese Taipei) Huang Liang-chi (Chinese Taipei) Hung Jui-chen	6–3, 6–4
Win	25–17	Apr 2014	China F5, Chengdu	Futures	Hard	(China) Li Zhe	(Russia) Victor Baluda (Belarus) Ilya Ivashka	0–1 ret.
Loss	25–18	May 2014	Anning, China, P.R.	Challenger	Clay	(United Kingdom) Daniel Cox	(Australia) Alex Bolt (Australia) Andrew Whittington	4–6, 3–6
Loss	25–19	May 2014	Karshi, Uzbekistan	Challenger	Hard	(Chinese Taipei) Peng Hsien-yin	(Belarus) Sergey Betov (Belarus) Aliaksandr Bury	5–7, 6–1, [6–10]
Win	26–19	Jun 2014	China F7, Putian	Futures	Hard	(China) Li Zhe	(Chinese Taipei) Peng Hsien-yin (Chinese Taipei) Yang Tsung-hua	6–1, 6–3
Win	27–19	Jul 2014	Kaohsiung, Chinese Taipei	Challenger	Hard	(Chinese Taipei) Peng Hsien-yin	(Chinese Taipei) Chen Ti (Chinese Taipei) Huang Liang-chi	6–3, 6–2
Loss	27–20	Aug 2014	Meerbusch, Uzbekistan	Challenger	Clay	(Chinese Taipei) Peng Hsien-yin	(Germany) Matthias Bachinger (Germany) Dominik Meffert	3–6, 6–3, [6–10]
Win	28–20	May 2015	Seoul, Korea, Rep.	Challenger	Hard	(Chinese Taipei) Peng Hsien-yin	(South Korea) Lee Hyung-taik (Thailand) Danai Udomchoke	6–4, 7–5
Loss	28–21	Sep 2015	Kaohsiung, Chinese Taipei	Challenger	Hard	(Chinese Taipei) Peng Hsien-yin	(Chinese Taipei) Hsieh Cheng-peng (Chinese Taipei) Yang Tsung-hua	2–6, 2–6
Loss	28–22	Nov 2015	Suzhou, China, P.R.	Challenger	Hard	(Chinese Taipei) Peng Hsien-yin	(Chinese Taipei) Lee Hsin-han (Ukraine) Denys Molchanov	6–3, 6–7^{(5–7)}, [4–10]
Win	29–22	Feb 2016	Kyoto, Japan	Challenger	Hard (i)	(Chinese Taipei) Yi Chu-huan	(Japan) Go Soeda (Japan) Yasutaka Uchiyama	6–3, 7–6^{(9–7)}
Win	30–22	Mar 2016	Zhuhai, China, P.R.	Challenger	Hard	(Chinese Taipei) Yi Chu-huan	(Chinese Taipei) Hsieh Cheng-peng (China) Wu Di	2–6, 6–1, [10–5]
Loss	30–23	May 2016	Seoul, Korea, Rep.	Challenger	Hard	(Chinese Taipei) Yi Chu-huan	(Australia) Matt Reid (Australia) John-Patrick Smith	3–6, 5–7
Win	31–23	Jun 2016	China F9, Jinan	Futures	Hard	(Chinese Taipei) Peng Hsien-yin	(United States) Mitchell Krueger (United States) Connor Smith	7–6^{(7–2)}, 6–4
Loss	31–24	Jun 2016	Blois, France	Challenger	Clay	(Japan) Yasutaka Uchiyama	(Germany) Simon Stadler (Germany) Alexander Satschko	3–6, 6–7^{(2–7)}
Win	32–24	Aug 2016	Chengdu, China, P.R.	Challenger	Hard	(China) Zhang Ze	(China) Gao Xin (China) Li Zhe	6–3, 4–6, [13–11]
Loss	32–25	Aug 2016	Qingdao, China, P.R.	Challenger	Clay	(China) Zhang Ze	(Serbia) Danilo Petrović (France) Tak Khunn Wang	2–6, 6–4, [5–10]
Loss	32–26	Feb 2017	San Francisco, USA	Challenger	Hard (i)	(China) Zhang Ze	(Australia) Matt Reid (Australia) John-Patrick Smith	7–6^{(7–4)}, 5–7, [7–10]
Win	33–26	Mar 2017	Zhuhai, China, P.R.	Challenger	Hard	(China) Zhang Ze	(South Africa) Ruan Roelofse (Chinese Taipei) Yi Chu-huan	6–3, 7–6^{(7–4)}
Loss	33–27	Oct 2017	Suzhou, China, P.R.	Challenger	Hard	(China) Zhang Ze	(China) Gao Xin (China) Sun Fajing	6–7^{(5–7)}, 6–4, [7–10]
Win	34–27	Apr 2018	Nanchang, China, P.R.	Challenger	Clay (i)	(China) Zhang Ze	(Philippines) Ruben Gonzales (Indonesia) Christopher Rungkat	3–6, 7–6^{(9–7)}, [10–7]
Loss	34–28	Apr 2018	Anning, China, P.R.	Challenger	Clay	(China) Zhang Ze	(Belarus) Aliaksandr Bury (South Africa) Lloyd Harris	3–6, 4–6
Win	35–28	Jul 2018	Recanati, Italy	Challenger	Hard	(China) Zhang Ze	(Ecuador) Gonzalo Escobar (Brazil) Fernando Romboli	2–6, 7–6^{(7–5)}, [10–8]
Win	36–28	Aug 2018	Chengdu, China, P.R.	Challenger	Hard	(China) Zhang Ze	(Russia) Mikhail Elgin (Belarus) Yaraslav Shyla	6–4, 6–4
Win	37–28	Sep 2018	Zhangjiagang, China, P.R.	Challenger	Hard	(China) Zhang Ze	(Australia) Bradley Mousley (Australia) Akira Santillan	w/o
Win	38–28	Sep 2018	Shanghai, China, P.R.	Challenger	Hard	(China) Zhang Ze	(China) Hua Runhao (China) Zhang Zhizhen	6–4, 3–6, [10–4]
Win	39–28	Oct 2018	Ningbo, China, P.R.	Challenger	Hard	(China) Zhang Ze	(Chinese Taipei) Hsieh Cheng-peng (Indonesia) Christopher Rungkat	7–5, 2–6, [10–5]
Win	40–28	Oct 2018	Liuzhou, China, P.R.	Challenger	Hard	(China) Zhang Ze	(Chinese Taipei) Hsieh Cheng-peng (Indonesia) Christopher Rungkat	6–3, 2–6, [10–3]
Win	41–28	Feb 2019	Bangkok, Thailand	Challenger	Hard	(China) Zhang Ze	(Chinese Taipei) Hsieh Cheng-peng (Indonesia) Christopher Rungkat	6–4, 6–4
Win	42–28	Mar 2019	Zhuhai, China, P.R.	Challenger	Hard	(China) Zhang Ze	(Australia) Max Purcell (Australia) Luke Saville	6–4, 6–4
Loss	42–29	Jun 2019	Nottingham, Great Britain	Challenger	Grass	(China) Zhang Ze	(Mexico) Santiago González (Pakistan) Aisam Qureshi	6–4, 6–7^{(5–7)}, [5–10]
Loss	42–30	Aug 2019	Yokkaichi, Japan	Challenger	Hard	(China) Zhang Ze	(South Korea) Nam Ji-sung (South Korea) Song Min-kyu	3–6, 6–3, [12–14]
Loss	42–31	Jan 2020	Bangkok, Thailand	Challenger	Hard	(China) Zhang Ze	(Mexico) Miguel Angel Reyes-Varela (Ecuador) Gonzalo Escobar	3–6, 3–6
