= Zhuhai Open =

Defunct tennis tournament
- Event name: Zhuhai Open (2017–2023); Zhuhai Challenger (2016); Zhuhai ITF Women's Pro Circuit (2015–2016)
- Location: Zhuhai, China
- Venue: Zhuhai Hengqin International Tennis Centre
- Surface: Hard
ATP Tour
- Category: ATP Challenger Tour
- Draw: 32S/32Q/16D
- Prize money: $75,000+H
WTA Tour
- Category: ITF Women's Circuit
- Draw: 32S/32Q/16D
- Prize money: $60,000

The Zhuhai Open was a professional tennis tournament played on hardcourts. It was part of the ATP Challenger Tour and the ITF Women's Circuit, and was held in Zhuhai, China, from 2015 till 2023.

== Past finals ==
=== Men's singles ===
Year	Champion	Runner-up	Score
2023	(France) Arthur Weber	(Chinese Taipei) Jason Jung	6–3, 5–7, 6–3
2020–22	Not held		
2019	(Spain) Enrique López Pérez	(Russia) Evgeny Karlovskiy	6–1, 6–4
2018	(Australia) Alex Bolt	(Poland) Hubert Hurkacz	5–7, 7–6^{(7–4)}, 6–2
2017	(Russia) Evgeny Donskoy	(Italy) Thomas Fabbiano	6–3, 6–4
2016	(Italy) Thomas Fabbiano	(China) Zhang Ze	5–7, 6–1, 6–3

=== Men's doubles ===
Year	Champions	Runners-up	Score
2023	(Switzerland) Luca Castelnuovo (Poland) Filip Peliwo	(China) Li Hanwen (China) Li Zhe	7–5, 7–6^{(7–4)}
2020–22	Not held		
2019	(China) Gong Maoxin (China) Zhang Ze	(Australia) Max Purcell (Australia) Luke Saville	6–4, 6–4
2018	(Ukraine) Denys Molchanov (Slovakia) Igor Zelenay	(Belarus) Aliaksandr Bury (Chinese Taipei) Peng Hsien-yin	7–5, 7–6^{(7–4)}
2017	(China) Gong Maoxin (China) Zhang Ze	(South Africa) Ruan Roelofse (Chinese Taipei) Yi Chu-huan	6–3, 7–6^{(7–4)}
2016	(China) Gong Maoxin (Chinese Taipei) Yi Chu-huan	(Chinese Taipei) Hsieh Cheng-peng (China) Wu Di	2–6, 6–1, [10–5]

=== Women's singles ===
Year	Champion	Runner-up	Score
2018	(Belgium) Maryna Zanevska	(Ukraine) Marta Kostyuk	6–2, 6–4
2017	(Czech Republic) Denisa Allertová	(China) Zheng Saisai	6–3, 2–6, 6–4
2016	(Belarus) Olga Govortsova	(Turkey) İpek Soylu	6–1, 6–2
2015	(Chinese Taipei) Chang Kai-chen	(China) Zhang Yuxuan	4–6, 6–1, 7–6^{(7–0)}

=== Women's doubles ===
Year	Champions	Runners-up	Score
2018	(Russia) Anna Blinkova (Netherlands) Lesley Kerkhove	(Japan) Nao Hibino (Montenegro) Danka Kovinić	7–5, 6–4
2017	(Netherlands) Lesley Kerkhove (Belarus) Lidziya Marozava	(Ukraine) Lyudmyla Kichenok (Ukraine) Nadiia Kichenok	6–4, 6–2
2016	(India) Ankita Raina (United Kingdom) Emily Webley-Smith	(China) Guo Hanyu (China) Jiang Xinyu	6–4, 6–4
2015	(China) Xu Shilin (China) You Xiaodi	(Russia) Irina Khromacheva (United Kingdom) Emily Webley-Smith	3–6, 6–2, [10–4]
