= 2017 ATP Finals =

- Date: 12–19 November
- Edition: 48th (singles) / 43rd (doubles)
- Category: ATP Finals
- Draw: 8S/8D
- Prize money: $8,000,000
- Surface: Hard / indoor
- Location: London, United Kingdom
- Venue: The O_{2} Arena

Champions

Singles
- (Bulgaria) Grigor Dimitrov

Doubles
- (Finland) Henri Kontinen / (Australia) John Peers
- ATP Finals

The 2017 ATP Finals (also known as the 2017 Nitto ATP Finals for Nitto sponsorship) was a men's tennis year-end tournament played at the O_{2} Arena in London, United Kingdom, from 12 to 19 November 2017. It was the season-ending event for the highest-ranked singles players and doubles teams on the 2017 ATP World Tour.

== Finals ==
=== Singles ===
(Bulgaria) Grigor Dimitrov defeated (Belgium) David Goffin, 7–5, 4–6, 6–3

- It was Dimitrov's 4th title of the year and 8th of his career. It was his 1st win at the event.

=== Doubles ===
(Finland) Henri Kontinen / (Australia) John Peers defeated (Poland) Łukasz Kubot / (Brazil) Marcelo Melo, 6–4, 6–2

== Tournament ==
The 2017 ATP Finals took place from 12 to 19 November at the O_{2} Arena in London, United Kingdom. It was the 48th edition of the tournament (43rd in doubles). The tournament was run by the Association of Tennis Professionals (ATP) and was part of the 2017 ATP World Tour. The event took on indoor hard courts. It served as the season-ending championships for players on the ATP Tour. The eight players who qualified for the event were split into two groups of four. During this stage, players competed in a round-robin format (meaning players played against all the other players in their group). The two players with the best results in each group progressed to the semifinals, where the winners of a group faced the runners-up of the other group. This stage, however, was a knock-out stage. The doubles competition used the same format.

=== Format ===
The ATP Finals had a round-robin format, with eight players/teams divided into two groups of four. The eight seeds were determined by the ATP rankings and ATP Doubles Team Rankings on the Monday after the last ATP World Tour tournament of the calendar year. All singles matches were the best of three tie-break sets, including the final. All doubles matches were two sets (no ad) and a Match Tie-break.

== Points and prize money ==
Stage	Singles	Doubles^{1}	Points
Champion	RR + $1,785,000	RR + $284,000	RR + 900
Runner-up	RR + $585,000	RR + $96,000	RR + 400
Round robin win per match	$191,000	$36,000	200
Participation fee	$191,000^{2}	$94,000^{3}	—N/a
Alternates	$105,000	$36,000	—N/a

- RR is points or prize money won in the round robin stage.
- ^{1} Prize money for doubles is per team.
- ^{2} Participation fee for 1RR match is $36,000 and 2RR matches is 71,000.
- ^{3} Participation fee for 1RR match is $105,000 and 2RR matches is $$143,000.
- An undefeated champion would earn the maximum 1,500 points, and $2,549,000 in singles or $486,000 in doubles.

== Qualification ==
=== Singles ===
Eight players compete at the tournament, with two named alternates. Players receive places in the following order of precedence:

1. First, the top 7 players in the ATP Race to London on the Monday after the final tournament of the ATP World Tour, that is, after the 2017 Paris Masters.
2. Second, up to two 2017 Grand Slam tournament winners ranked anywhere 8th-20th, in ranking order
3. Third, the eighth ranked player in the ATP rankings

In the event of this totaling more than 8 players, those lower down in the selection order become the alternates. If further alternates are needed, these players are selected by the ATP.

Provisional rankings are published weekly as the Emirates ATP Race to London, coinciding with the 52-week rolling ATP rankings on the date of selection. Points are accumulated in Grand Slam, ATP World Tour, ATP Challenger Tour and ITF Futures tournaments from the 52 weeks prior to the selection date, with points from the previous years Tour Finals excluded. Players accrue points across 18 tournaments, usually made up of:

- The 4 Grand Slam tournaments
- The 8 mandatory ATP Masters tournaments
- The best results from any 6 other tournaments that carry ranking points

All players must include the ranking points for mandatory Masters tournaments for which they are on the original acceptance list and for all Grand Slams for which they would be eligible, even if they do not compete (in which case they receive zero points). Furthermore, players who finished 2016 in the world's top 30 are commitment players who must (if not injured) include points for the 8 mandatory Masters tournament regardless of whether they enter, and who must compete in at least 4 ATP 500 tournaments (though the Monte Carlo Masters may count to this total), of which one must take place after the US Open. Zero point scores may also be taken from withdrawals by non-injured players from ATP 500 tournaments according to certain other conditions outlined by the ATP. Beyond these rules, however, a player may substitute his next best tournament result for missed Masters and Grand Slam tournaments.

Players may have their ATP World Tour Masters 1000 commitment reduced by one tournament, by reaching each of the following milestones:

1. 600 tour level matches (as of January 1, 2017), including matches from Challengers and Futures played before year 2010;
2. 12 years of service;
3. 31 years of age (as of January 1, 2017).

If a player satisfies all three of these conditions, their mandatory ATP World Tour Masters 1000 commitment is dropped entirely. Players must be in good standing as defined by the ATP as to avail of the reduced commitment.

=== Doubles ===
Eight teams compete at the tournament, with one named alternates. The eight competing teams receive places according to the same order of precedence as in Singles. The named alternate will be offered first to any unaccepted teams in the selection order, then to the highest ranked unaccepted team, and then to a team selected by the ATP. Points are accumulated in the same competitions as for the Singles tournament. However, for Doubles teams there are no commitment tournaments, so teams are ranked according to their 18 highest points scoring results from any tournaments.

== Qualified players ==
=== Singles ===
#	Players	Points	Tourn.	Date Qualified
1	(Spain) Rafael Nadal	10,645	17	13 June
2	(Switzerland) Roger Federer	9,005	11	17 July
3	(Germany) Alexander Zverev	4,410	24	6 October
4	(Austria) Dominic Thiem	3,815	26	13 October
5	(Croatia) Marin Čilić	3,805	20	24 October
6	(Bulgaria) Grigor Dimitrov	3,650	22	24 October
–	Stan Wawrinka (SUI)	3,150	12	4 August
7	(Belgium) David Goffin	2,975	24	2 November
8	(United States) Jack Sock	2,765	21	5 November

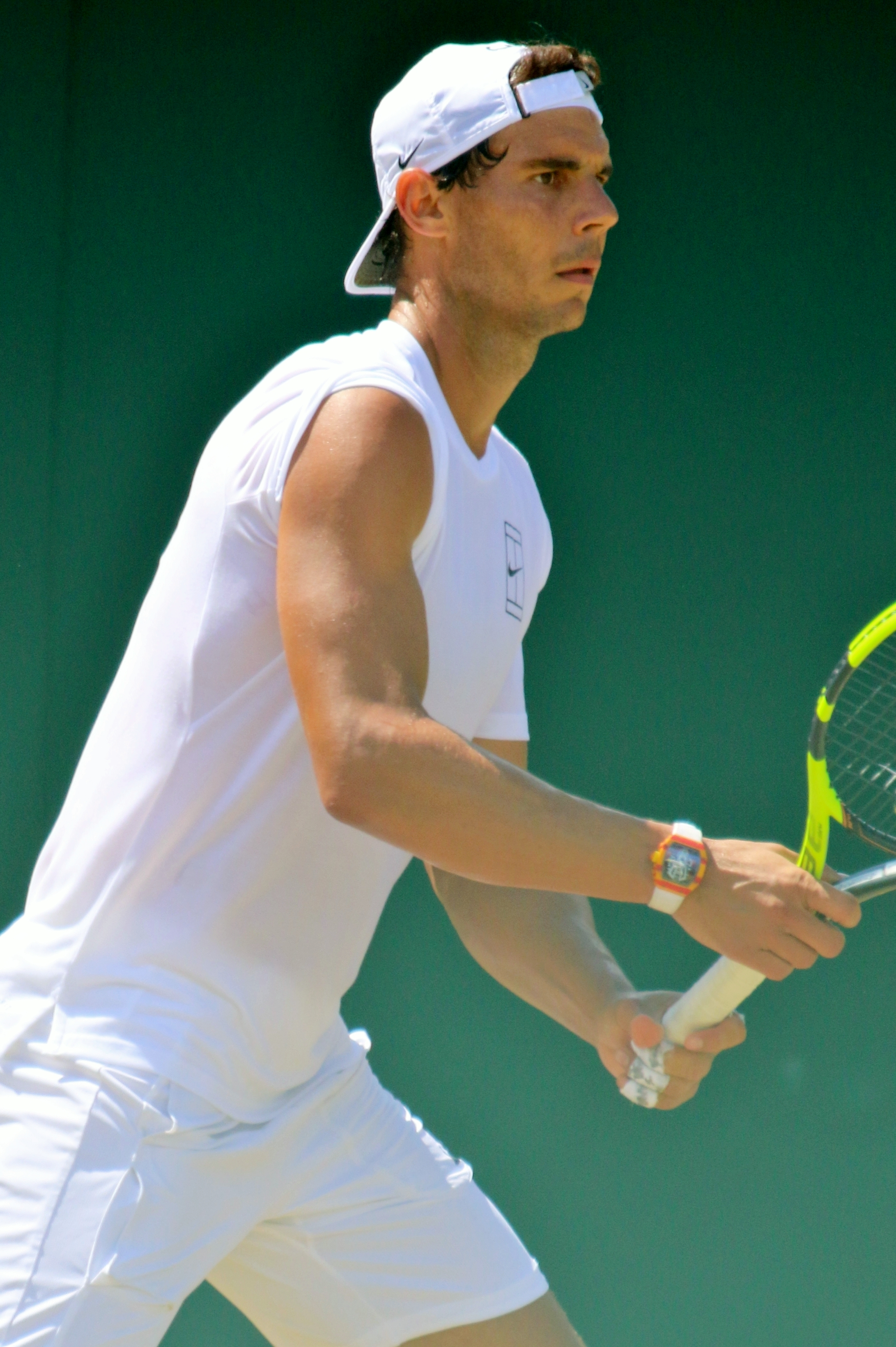
Nadal won his 10th French Open title

On June 13, following claiming his tenth French Open, Rafael Nadal became the first qualifier.

Rafael Nadal opened his season by playing at the Brisbane International for the first time, where he reached the quarterfinals before losing to Milos Raonic in three sets. Nadal then entered the Australian Open he reached the final and set up a clash against Roger Federer, his first Grand Slam final since he won the 2014 French Open. Nadal went on to lose to Federer in five sets; this was the first time that Nadal had lost to Federer in a Grand Slam since the final of the 2007 Wimbledon Championships. Nadal made it to the final of the Abierto Mexicano Telcel without dropping a set, but was defeated by big-serving Sam Querrey. In a rematch of the Australian Open final Nadal took on Federer in the fourth round of the Indian Wells Masters but again lost to his old rival. In the Miami Masters, Nadal reached the final to again play Federer, and was once again defeated in straight sets. At the European clay court swing, Nadal won back-to-back-to-back titles at the Monte-Carlo Rolex Masters defeating compatriot Albert Ramos, Barcelona Open and Mutua Madrid Open defeating Dominic Thiem in the finals on both occasions. At the Italian Open, Nadals 17-match winning streak was snapped by Thiem in the quarterfinals. Nadal then went on to beat Stan Wawrinka in straight sets and win a record tenth French Open title. This marked his first Grand Slam title since 2014 French Open, ending his three-year drought in Grand Slams.

Nadal lost in the fourth round at the Wimbledon Championships, 13–15 in the fifth set, to Gilles Müller. For his preparation for the US Open, Nadal competed at the Rogers Cup and Western & Southern Open, but had disappointing results falling in the third round to Canadian teenager Denis Shapovalov and in the quarterfinals to Nick Kyrgios, respectively. However, Nadal bounced back by earning his third US Open title against first-time Grand Slam finalist Kevin Anderson, winning the final in straight sets. Nadal extended his winning streak by winning the China Open, winning the final against Kyrgios in straight sets. He also reached the final of the Shanghai Rolex Masters but once again fell to Federer for the fourth time in the year. At the Rolex Paris Masters he retired prior to his quarterfinal match against Filip Krajinović due to a knee injury.

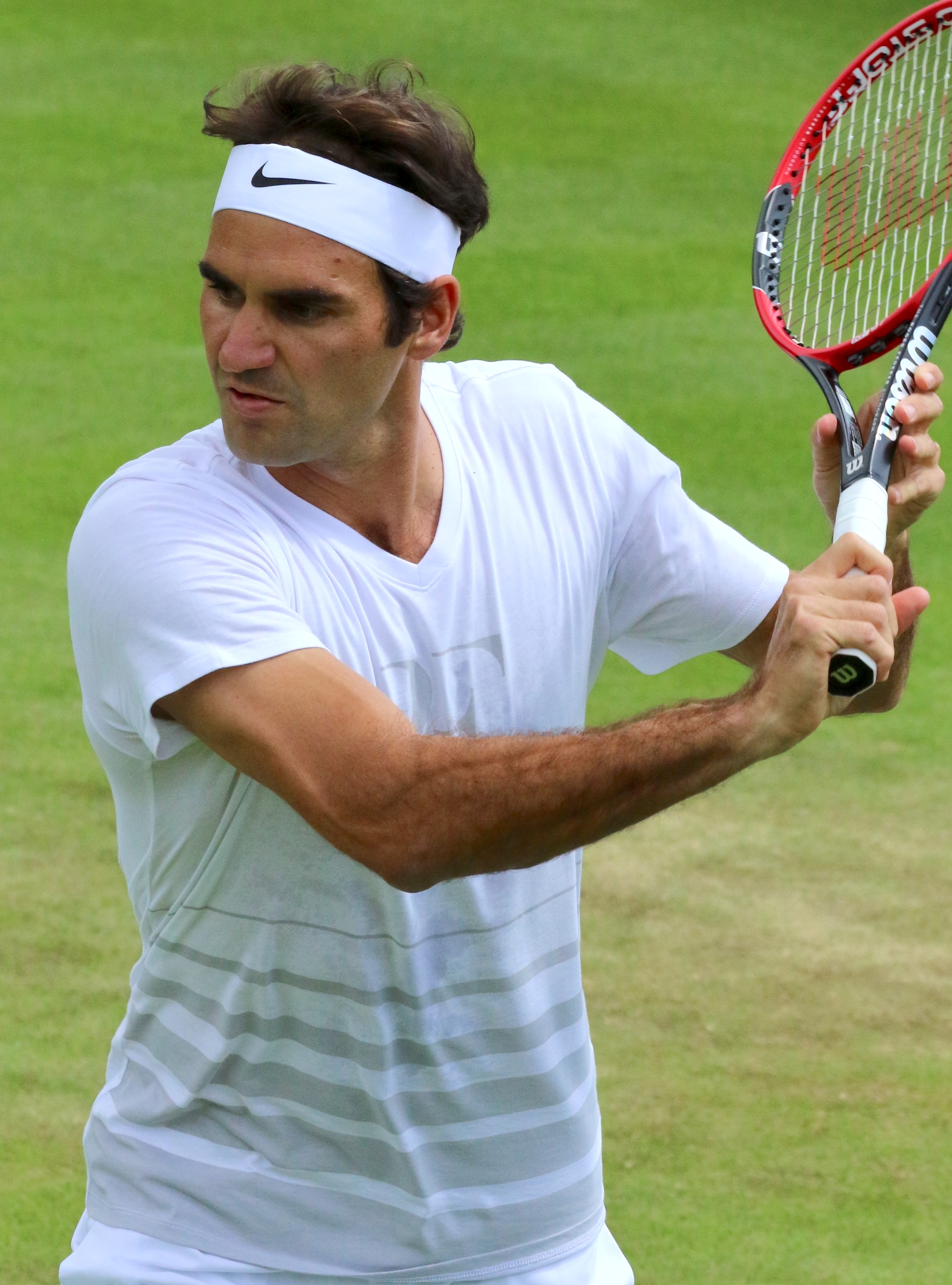
Federer won his 8th Wimbledon title

On July 17, following claiming his Wimbledon triumph, Roger Federer qualified for the event.

Roger Federer began his season by playing in the Hopman Cup teaming up with Belinda Bencic but lost in the round robin round. At the Australian Open, he reached the final thus making him the oldest player to compete in a Grand Slam final since Ken Rosewall in 1974. Coming back from a break down in the fifth set, Federer defeated Rafael Nadal to win the Australian Open. He then competed at the Dubai Tennis Championships but was upset by Evgeny Donskoy in the second round. Federer bounced back by winning the back-to-back Masters event of the Indian Wells Masters and Miami Masters defeating Stan Wawrinka and Nadal in the finals, respectively. Federer then skipped the entire European clay swing. He returned to the tour at the beginning of the grass-court season MercedesCup, where he suffered a shock defeat to 302nd ranked Tommy Haas in the second round despite holding match points, the lowest-ranked player to beat him since 1999. He rebounded the following week by winning a record-extending ninth title at the Gerry Weber Open in Halle, doing so without the loss of a set and defeating Alexander Zverev in the final. At the Wimbledon Championships, Federer made it to the final without dropping a set, where he defeated Marin Čilić in straight sets to win a record-breaking eighth Wimbledon gentlemen's singles title and his record-extending 19th major title overall, becoming the oldest male player to win Wimbledon in the Open era. At the opening of the summer hard court swing Federer was defeated in the final of the Rogers Cup by Alexander Zverev. Due to a back injury, he opted to withdraw from the Western & Southern Open. However, Federer lost to Juan Martín del Potro in the quarterfinals at the US Open. He bounced back by winning consecutive titles at the Shanghai Rolex Masters defeating World No. 1 Nadal in the final and at the Swiss Indoors beating Juan Martín del Potro in the final of his hometown tournament.

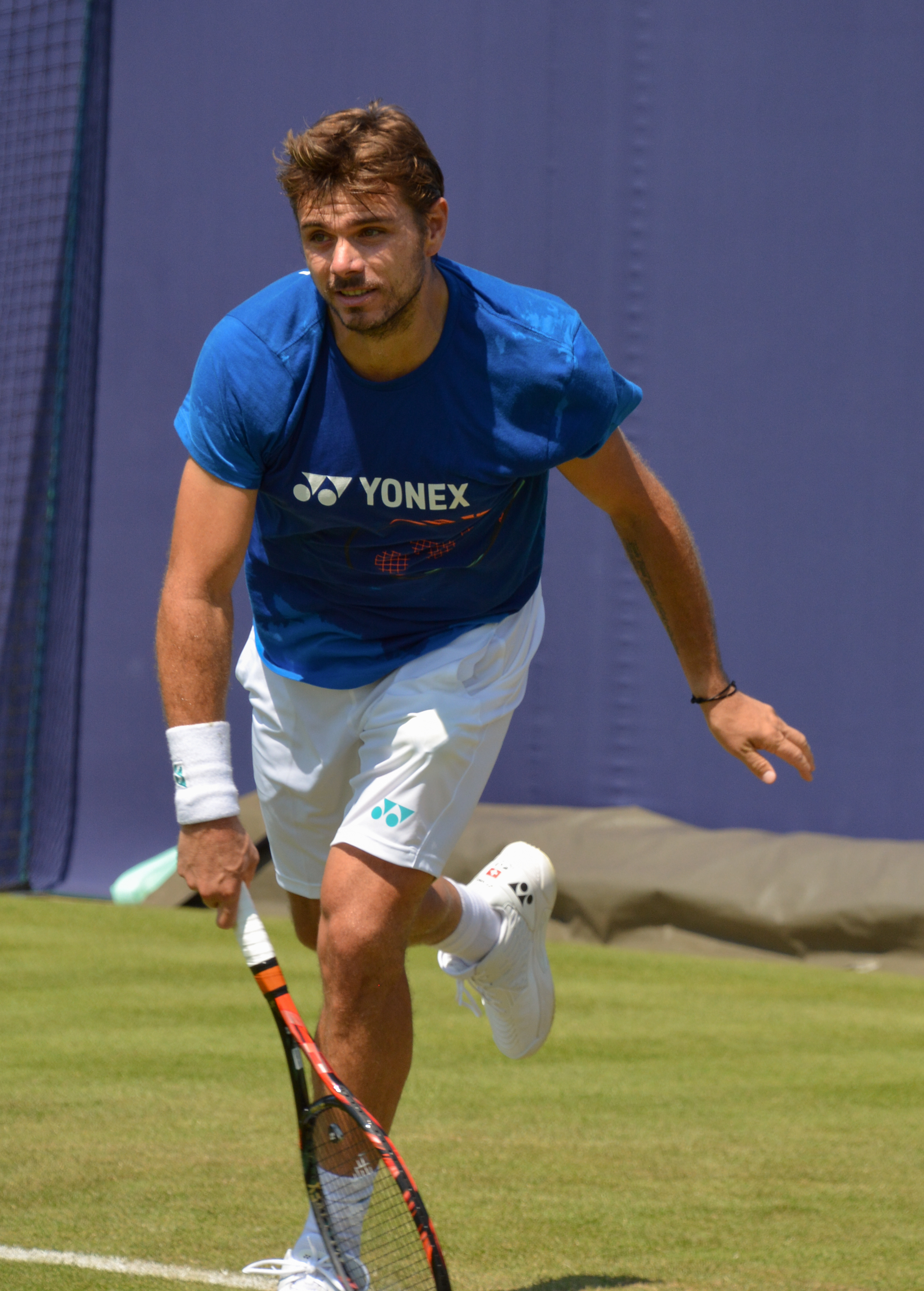
Wawrinka reached the final of the French Open.

On August 4, Stan Wawrinka announced that he was ending his season due to a knee injury, even though he would have qualified for the event

Stan Wawrinka started his 2017 campaign at the Brisbane International reaching the semifinals, losing to Kei Nishikori. At the Australian Open, he set up a semifinal against his compatriot and 17th seed Roger Federer. Wawrinka lost the all-Swiss clash, recovering from a two sets to love deficit but ultimately lost the fifth set. He then upset by Damir Džumhur in the first round of the Dubai Tennis Championships in straight sets. At the Indian Wells Masters, Wawrinka reached his first final Masters final on hard court. He was defeated by Roger Federer in the final in straight sets. He then was the top seed for the first time in a Master event at the Miami Masters but was defeated in the fourth round by Alexander Zverev Jr. in three sets. The start of his French Open preparation was disappointing as he compiled a 2–3 record in the three clay masters event losing in the third round of the Monte Carlo Rolex Masters to Pablo Cuevas, second round of Mutua Madrid Open to Benoît Paire and third round of Italian Open to John Isner. However, he bounced back by winning his lone title of the year at the Geneva Open defeating Mischa Zverev in the final in three sets. At the French Open, Wawrinka reached the final after defeating Andy Murray in the semifinals but lost his first slam final to Rafael Nadal in straight sets. At the grass season, he lost in the first rounds of the Queen's Club Championships to Feliciano López and the Wimbledon Championships to Daniil Medvedev. Wawrinka announced that he would undergo surgery to repair the damage on his knee, and that he would miss the remainder of the 2017 tennis season.

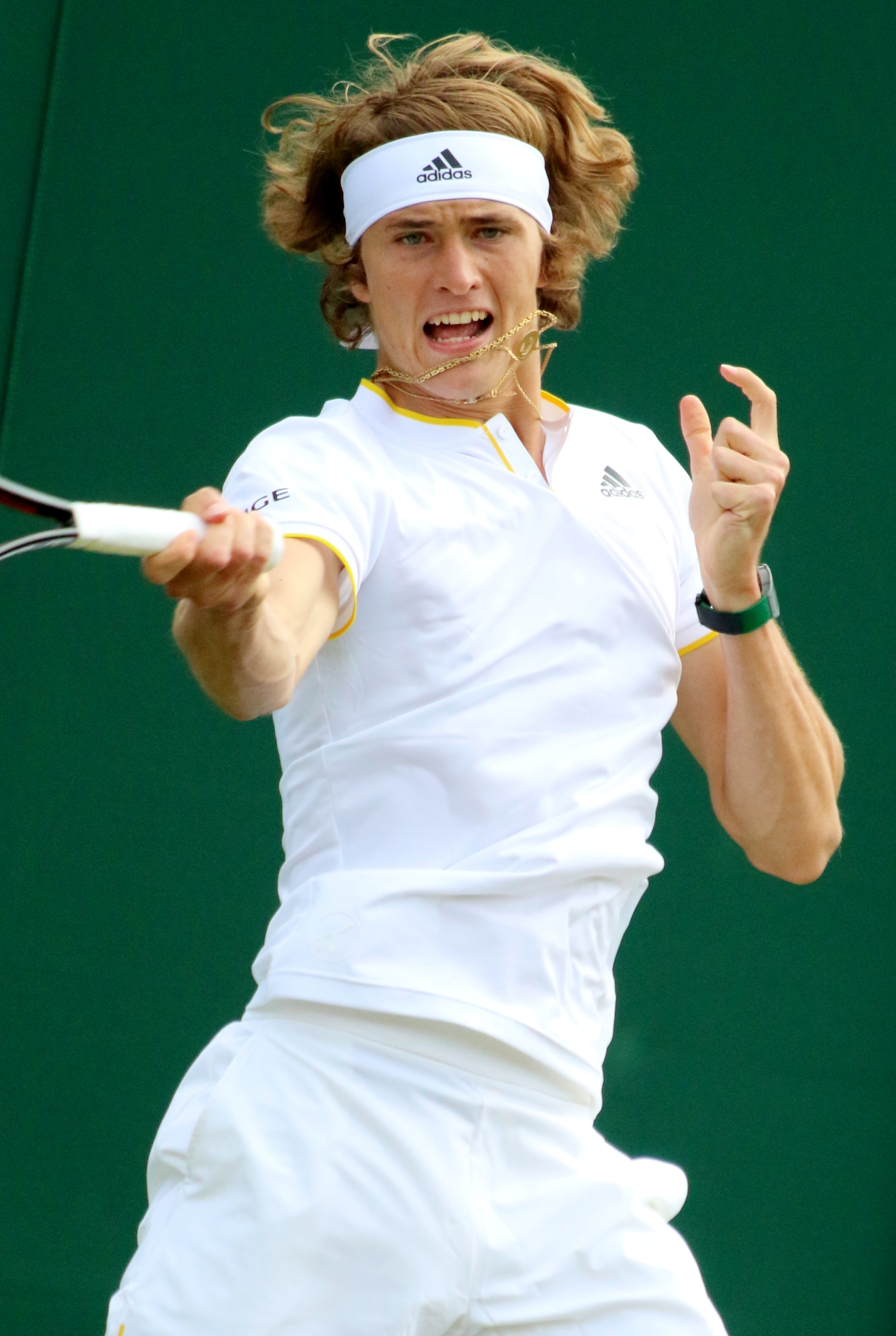
Zverev won his first two Masters of his career

On October 6, Alexander Zverev qualifies for the first time.

Alexander Zverev began the year by competing at the Hopman Cup with Andrea Petkovic but lost in the round robin round. He then fell in the third round of the Australian Open to eventual runner-up Rafael Nadal in a five-set match.In his second appearance at the Open Sud de France, Zverev won his first title of the year, beating Richard Gasquet in straight sets. After two successive first-round losses at the Rotterdam Open and Open 13 to Dominic Thiem and Nicolas Mahut, respectively, Zverev played at the Indian Wells Masters, where he lost to Nick Kyrgios in the third round. Zverev made it to his first Masters event quarterfinal at the Miami Masters, where he lost to Kyrgios once again. He started his clay court season with third round exits at the Monte-Carlo Rolex Masters losing to Nadal and Barcelona Open, where he lost to qualifier Chung Hyeon in straight sets. Zverev then won his second title of the year at the BMW Open defeating Guido Pella to win the title. Zverev then competed at the Mutua Madrid Open where he lost in the quarterfinals to Uruguayan Pablo Cuevas. At the Italian Open, Zverev continued his excellent form by winning his first Masters event title when he defeated Novak Djokovic in straight sets. Despite his triumph in Rome, he went on to lose in the first round of the French Open to Fernando Verdasco in four sets.

Zverev began his grass-court season at the Ricoh Open as second seed and reached the semifinals, where he lost to eventual champion Gilles Müller. In his next tournament, Zverev reached the final of the Gerry Weber Open for the second consecutive year, but lost to Roger Federer in only 53 minutes. At the Wimbledon Championships, he achieved his best result at a Grand Slam event to date, falling in the fourth round to the previous years' runner up and 6th seed Milos Raonic in a five-set match. Zverev returned to hard courts at the Citi Open, where he claimed his fifth ATP title. He defeated South African Kevin Anderson in straight sets in the final to win his first ATP World Tour 500 event. He next played the Rogers Cup, defeating his childhood idol and second seed Roger Federer in the final, clinching his second consecutive career Masters title. Despite his previous week's success, a fatigued Zverev lost in the second round of the Western & Southern Open to Frances Tiafoe in three sets. Zverev returned to the US Open for the fourth time, this time as a favourite and as fourth seed but was upset by Borna Ćorić in four sets, in the second round. Zverev started off the Asian swing with a quarterfinal appearance at the Shenzhen Open, losing to Damir Džumhur in straight sets. At the China Open, he reached the semifinals, where he lost to Nick Kyrgios in straight sets. This was his third loss in four matches against rival Kyrgios. At the Shanghai Rolex Masters lost to Juan Martín del Potro in the third round. He then suffered back-to-back loses in the quarterfinals of the Erste Bank Open to Jo-Wilfried Tsonga and the second round of the Rolex Paris Masters to Robin Haase

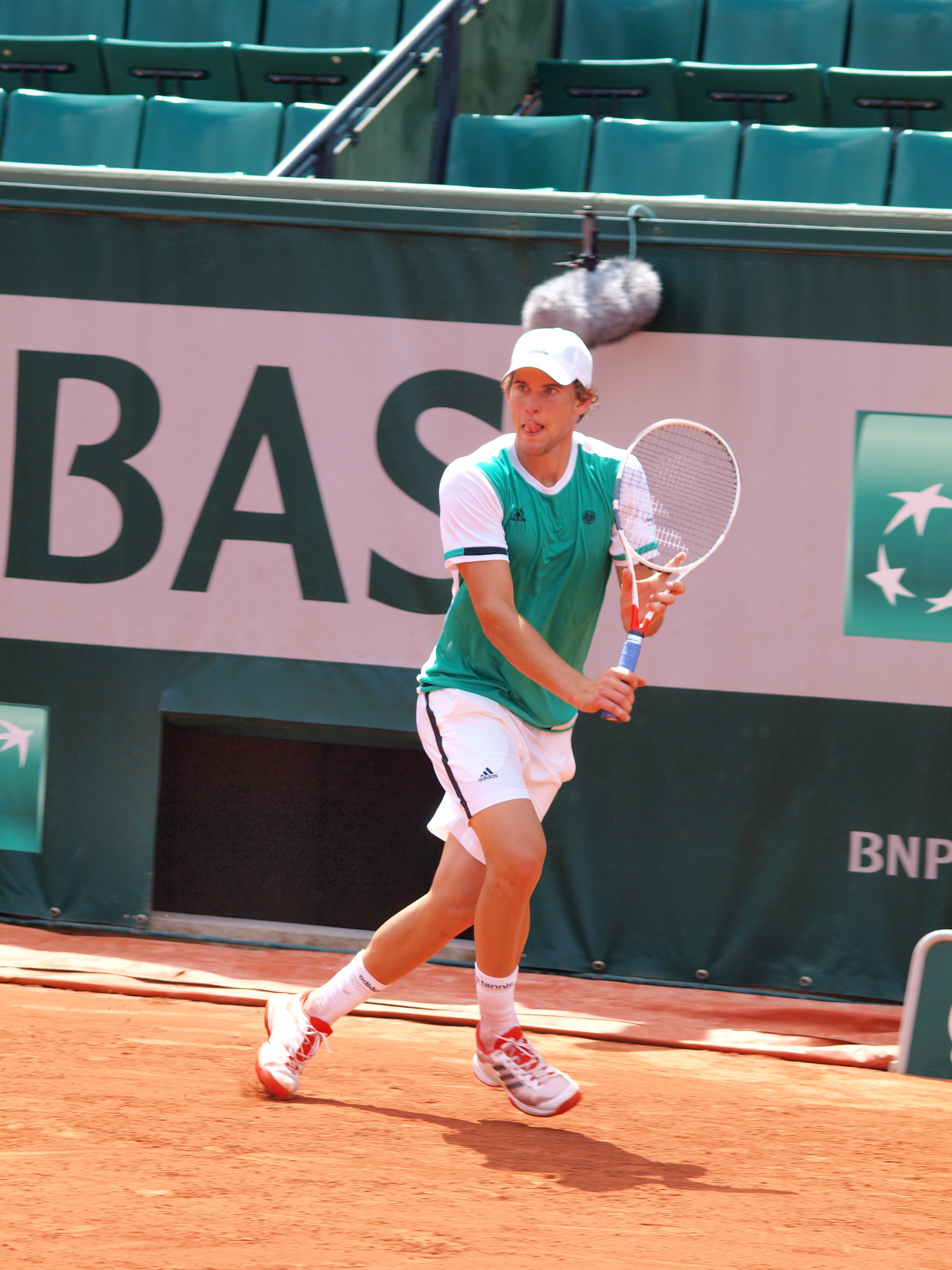
Thiem reached a career high of number 4 in the world.

On October 13, Dominic Thiem became the fourth qualifier.

Dominic Thiem began the year with quarterfinal showings at the Brisbane International and Apia International Sydney, losing eventual winner Grigor Dimitrov and finalist Dan Evans, respectively. At the Australian Open, Thiem fell once again to David Goffin as in the previous year, this time in the fourth round. After defeat in his first match at the Sofia Open to Nikoloz Basilashvili, Thiem headed to the Rotterdam Open but was surprisingly defeated in the quarterfinals by Pierre-Hugues Herbert. At the Rio Open. Thiem reached his first final of the year, and claimed his eighth title defeating Pablo Carreño Busta in the final. At the Abierto Mexicano Telcel, as the defending champion, his run was ended by Sam Querrey in the quarterfinals. Thiem then headed to the Indian Wells Masters for the first Masters 1000 event of the year. In the quarter-finals, he met Stan Wawrinka, but Thiem would miss out on a first Masters 1000 semi-final, losing a final set tie-breaker. After losing his opening round match at the Miami Masters to Borna Ćorić, and second round exit at the Monte Carlo Rolex Masters to Goffin, he made his 12th ATP tour final, and second of the year, in Barcelona Open losing to Rafael Nadal in two sets. At the Mutua Madrid Open, Thiem for the second tournament in a row faced Nadal in the final but lost once again. However at the Italian Open, he finally upset Nadal in the quarterfinals, before falling to Novak Djokovic in the Semifinals. At the French Open, he reached his second French Open semifinal in a row but lost once again to eventual champion Nadal in straight sets.

At the beginning of the grass court season, Thiem reached the second round of the Gerry Weber Open, losing to Robin Haase. Then, in opening round at the Antalya Open, he was stunned by qualifier Ramkumar Ramanathan, then ranked 222 in the world. He made a comeback in Wimbledon, reaching the fourth round for the first time in his career. He was ousted by eventual semi-finalist Tomáš Berdych. Thiem then participated in the Citi Open, where he lost narrowly to Kevin Anderson in the third round. At the Rogers Cup, he received a bye into the second round, but lost to Diego Schwartzman. He then reached the quarter-finals of the Western & Southern Open, where he lost to David Ferrer in straight sets. At the US Open, Thiem made it to the fourth round but lost to Juan Martín del Potro after winning the first two sets and failing to capitalize on two match points in the fourth set. Thiem Asian swing was a disaster, when he failed to win a match, losing in his opening matches of the Chengdu Open, Japan Open and Shanghai Rolex Masters against Guido Pella, Steve Johnson and Viktor Troicki respectively. He then lost his second match in both the Erste Bank Open and Rolex Paris Masters to Richard Gasquet and Fernando Verdasco respectively.

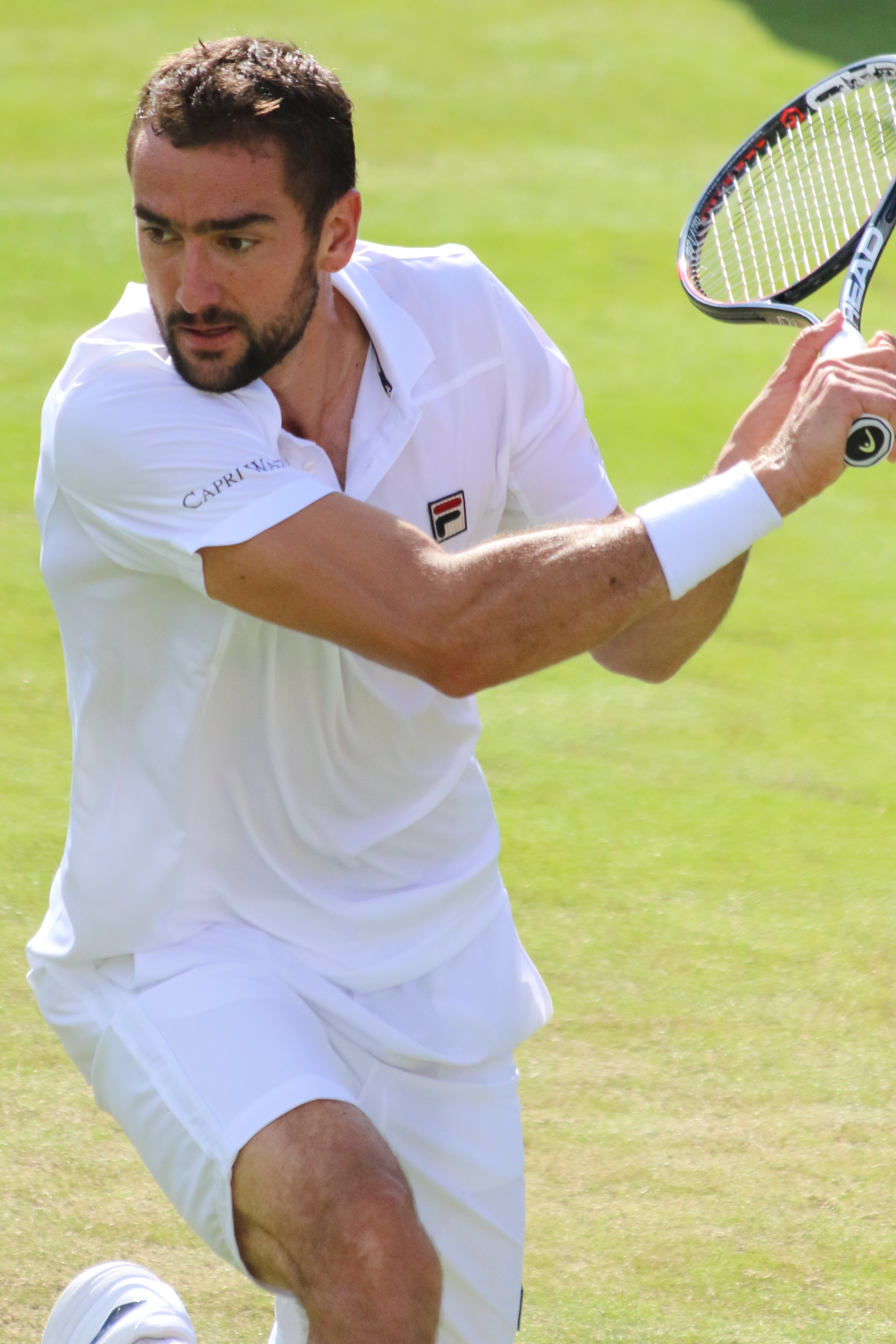
Čilić reached the final of Wimbledon

On October 24, Marin Čilić and Grigor Dimitrov occupied the next two slots.

Marin Čilić started his 2017 season as first seed at the Chennai Open but lost to Jozef Kovalík in the second round. In the first major of the year, the Australian Open, Čilić lost in the second round to Dan Evans. His bad start continued when he lost in the second round to Dustin Brown at the Open Sud de France. However, he was able compile decent results for reaching the quarterfinals of the Rotterdam Open losing to Jo-Wilfried Tsonga and the semifinals of Abierto Mexicano Telcel losing to Rafael Nadal. His struggle continued when he lost back-to-back matches in the second rounds of the Indian Wells Masters to Taylor Fritz and Miami Masters to Jérémy Chardy. His losing streak ended when he reached the quarterfinals of the Monte Carlo Rolex Masters losing to Albert Ramos Viñolas. Čilić then won the title at the Istanbul Open, defeating Milos Raonic in the final, in straight sets. Despite this, at the Mutua Madrid Open he lost in the second round to Alexander Zverev. At the Italian Open, he fell to John Isner in the quarterfinals. Čilić reached the quarterfinal of the French Open for the first time in his career and thus became one of the few tennis players who reached the quarterfinal stage of every Grand Slam. However, he lost to Stan Wawrinka in this round.

In the grass season, he began at the Queen's Club Championships, Marin made the final for the third time in his career, facing Feliciano López in the final, losing in three sets, after having a championship point in the final-set tiebreaker. At Wimbledon Championships, Čilić reached his maiden Wimbledon final, where he lost to Roger Federer in straight sets, he was suffering from a blister. An adductor injury forced Čilić to miss the Canadian Open and the Cincinnati Masters. Čilić returned to play at the US Open where he lost to Diego Schwartzman in the third round. In October, Čilić reached the semifinals of the Japan Open, Shanghai Rolex Masters and Swiss Indoors losing to Adrian Mannarino, Nadal and Juan Martín del Potro, respectively. He then reached quarterfinals of the final regular event of the year the Rolex Paris Masters losing to Julien Benneteau

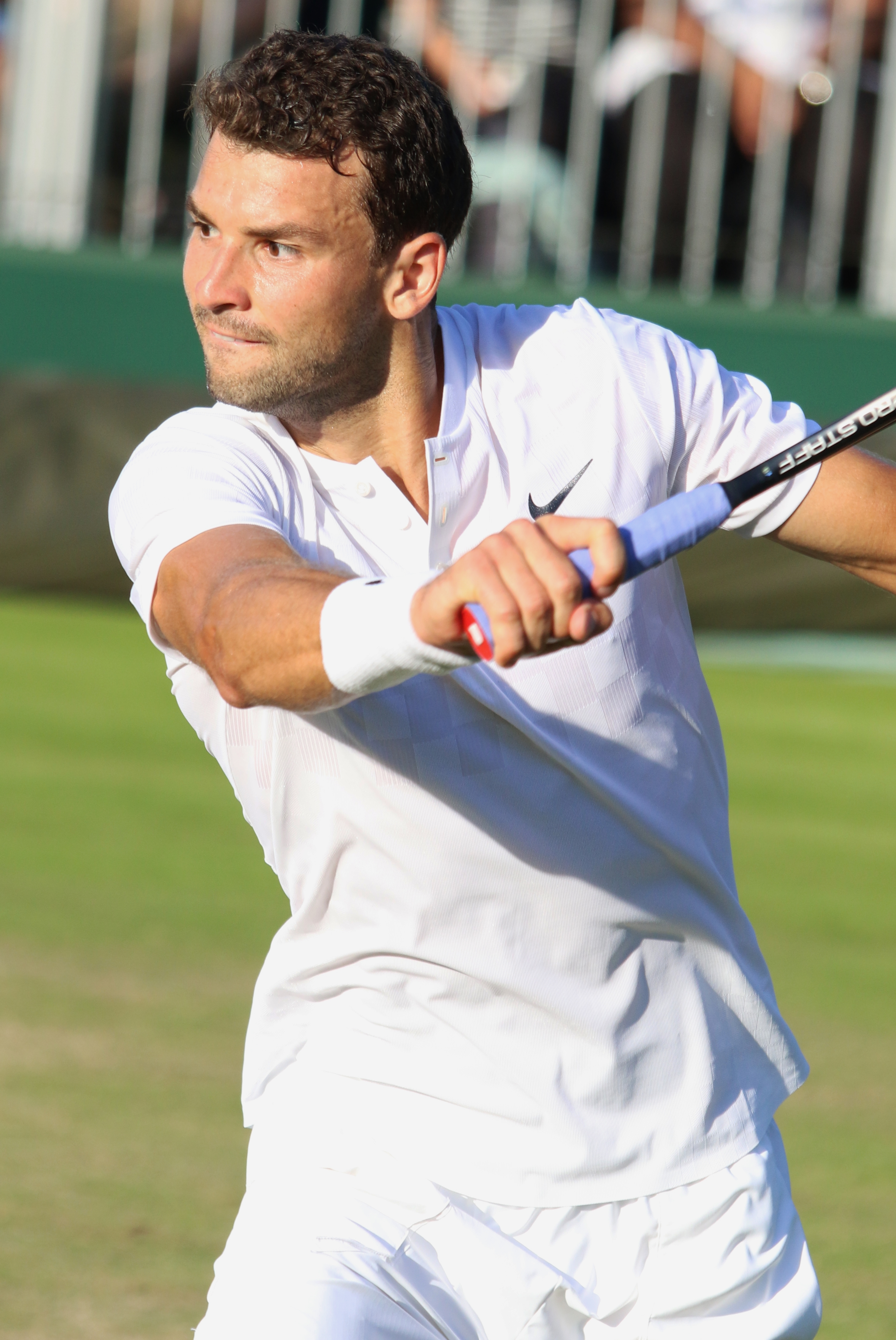
Dimitrov won his first Masters title in Cincinnati

Grigor Dimitrov had a flying start to the season winning the Brisbane International overcoming world No. 5 Kei Nishikori in three sets, winning his first ATP title in nearly three years. Dimitrov next moved on to play at the Australian Open, where he extended his winning streak further, reaching the semifinals being eliminated by Rafael Nadal in a five-set thriller, which lasted almost 5 hours. Dimitrov competed in the Sofia Open, where he was seeded third. The Bulgarian maintained his excellent start to the season, winning his second title of the year on home soil, defeating Belgian David Goffin in straight sets in the final. However, the Belgian managed to grab his first victory over Dimitrov, eliminating him in three sets in the quarterfinals of the Rotterdam Open. Dimitrov then played in the Indian Wells Masters, losing in three sets to Jack Sock in the third round, after missing four match points. This followed by an upset by unseeded Guido Pella in the second round of the Miami Masters. Dimitrov's struggle in form continued with back-to-back loses in the beginning of his clay court season with a loss to Tommy Robredo in the second round of the Grand Prix Hassan II and at the Monte-Carlo Rolex Masters second round to qualifier Jan-Lennard Struff.The Bulgarian ended his losing streak at the Mutua Madrid Open, reaching the third round, where he was eliminated by Dominic Thiem in three tight sets after missing five match points in the third-set tiebreak. Next, Dimitrov had a first-round exit in the Italian Open, being defeated by Juan Martín del Potro in three sets. Dimitrov then went to the third round of French Open, where he lost to Pablo Carreño Busta.

Dimitrov started on grass court of the MercedesCup where he lost in his first match to Jerzy Janowicz. The Bulgarian then had a good run at the Queen's Club Championships, where he reached the semifinals but lost in three sets to in-form eventual champion Feliciano López. Without dropping a set, the Bulgarian reached the fourth round at Wimbledon Championships, but then lost in straight sets to eventual champion Roger Federer. Dimitrov returned to hard courts, after reaching third rounds at the Citi Open losing to Daniil Medvedev and the Rogers Cup losing to Robin Haase, the Bulgarian won his first Masters event title at Western & Southern Open, defeating Nick Kyrgios in the final in straight sets, winning the tournament without losing a set. Dimitrov was then upset at the second round of the US Open, where he lost to teenager Andrey Rublev. At the Asian swing, Dimitrov reached the semi-finals of the China Open and the quarter-finals of the Shanghai Rolex Masters. In both events the Bulgarian was eliminated by world No. 1 Rafael Nadal in three-setters. Dimitrov then advanced to the final of the Stockholm Open but lost to US Open semifinalist Juan Martín del Potro in straight sets. At the Paris Rolex Masters he lost in the third round to big serving John Isner in three sets.

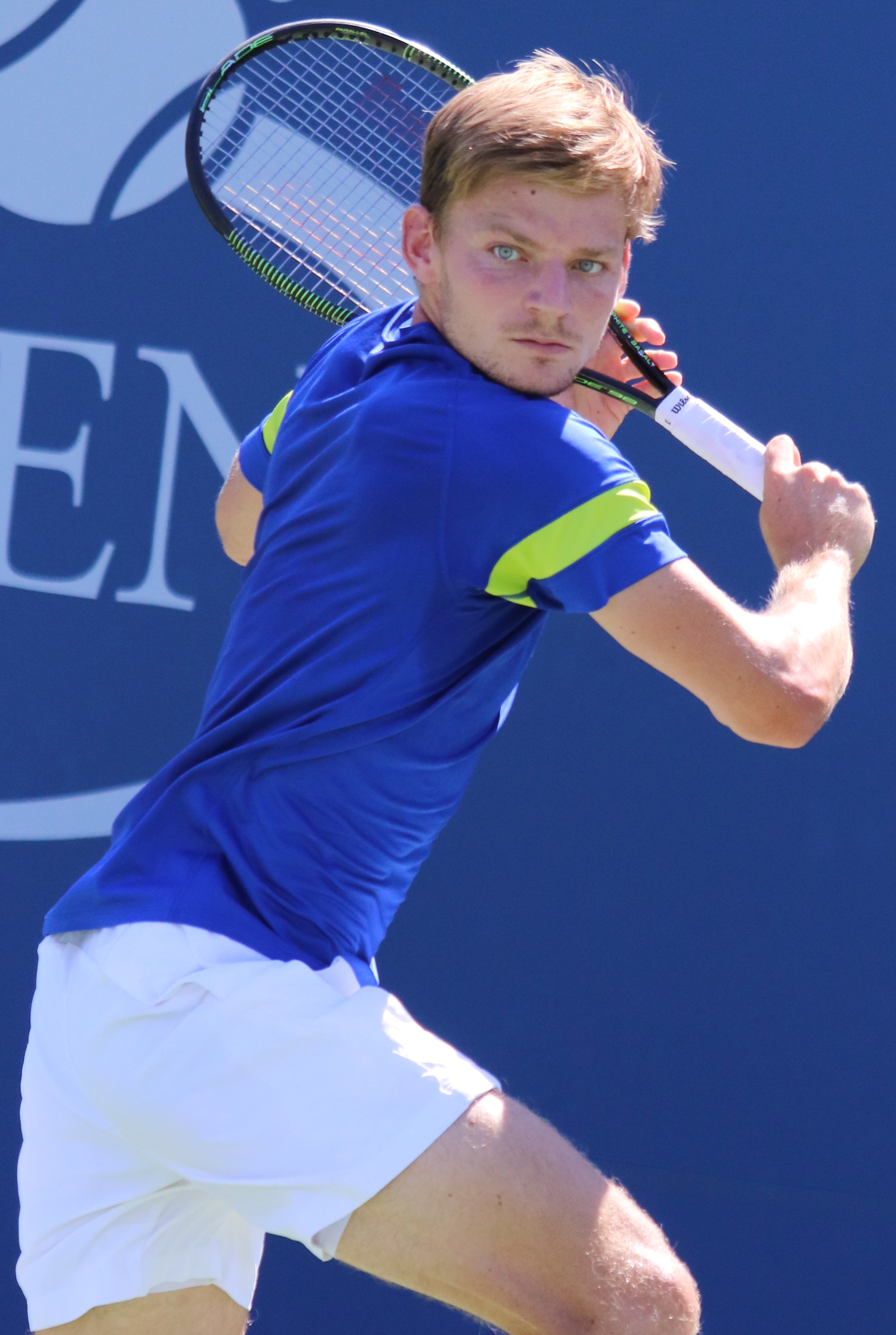
Goffin reached the quarterfinals of the Australian Open

On November 2, David Goffin became the seventh qualified for the event.

David Goffin started 2017 at the Qatar Open, losing to Fernando Verdasco in the second round. Goffin reached the quarterfinals of a Grand Slam for the second time at the Australian Open. He was then defeated in straight sets by Grigor Dimitrov. Goffin defeated defending champion Roberto Bautista Agut to reach the final of the Sofia Open. There, he lost in straight sets again to Dimitrov. A week later, he recorded his first victory over Dimitrov in the quarterfinals of the Rotterdam Open and went on to reach his second-straight final, but lost in three sets to Jo-Wilfried Tsonga. This resulted in him achieving a top ten ranking for the first time, becoming the first Belgian man to do so. At the Abierto Mexicano Telcel, he lost in the second round to eventual champion Sam Querrey. After losing in the fourth round of both the Indian Wells Masters and Miami Masters to Pablo Cuevas and Nick Kyrgios, respectively, Goffin made the semifinals of the Monte Carlo Masters where he lost in straight sets to the eventual champion, Rafael Nadal. He was then upset by Karen Khachanov in the third round of the Barcelona Open. He went on to reach the quarterfinals in Mutua Madrid Open and the fourth round of the Italian Open, falling to Nadal and Marin Čilić, respectively. At the French Open, Goffin was forced to retire whilst leading his third round match against Horacio Zeballos. He injured his right ankle when he tripped on a tarpaulin by the side of the court, which made him miss the grass season.

Goffin returned to the tour with quarterfinal losses at the Croatia Open Umag to Ivan Dodig and Swiss Open Gstaad to Robin Haase. Following second and first round losses of the Rogers Cup to Chung Hyeon and Western & Southern Open to Kyrgios, respectively, Goffin reached the fourth round of the US Open the first time. There, he lost to Andrey Rublev in straight sets. He then led Belgium to another Davis Cup victory against Australia in the World Group semifinals with four-set wins in both his singles rubbers against Nick Kyrgios and John Millman. With this win, Belgium reached its second Davis Cup final in three years. At the Moselle Open, he lost in the quarterfinals to Benoît Paire. At the Asian swing Goffin won back-to-back titles at the ATP Shenzhen Open to Alexandr Dolgopolov and Japan Open to Adrian Mannarino. However, at the Shanghai Rolex Masters, Goffin lost in his opening match to Gilles Simon. In his home event of the European Open, he lost in the quarterfinals to Stefanos Tsitsipas. At the Swiss Indoors, he was able to reach the semifinals, losing to eventual champion Roger Federer. In the Masters event of Paris Rolex Masters, he was upset by Julien Benneteau in the third round.

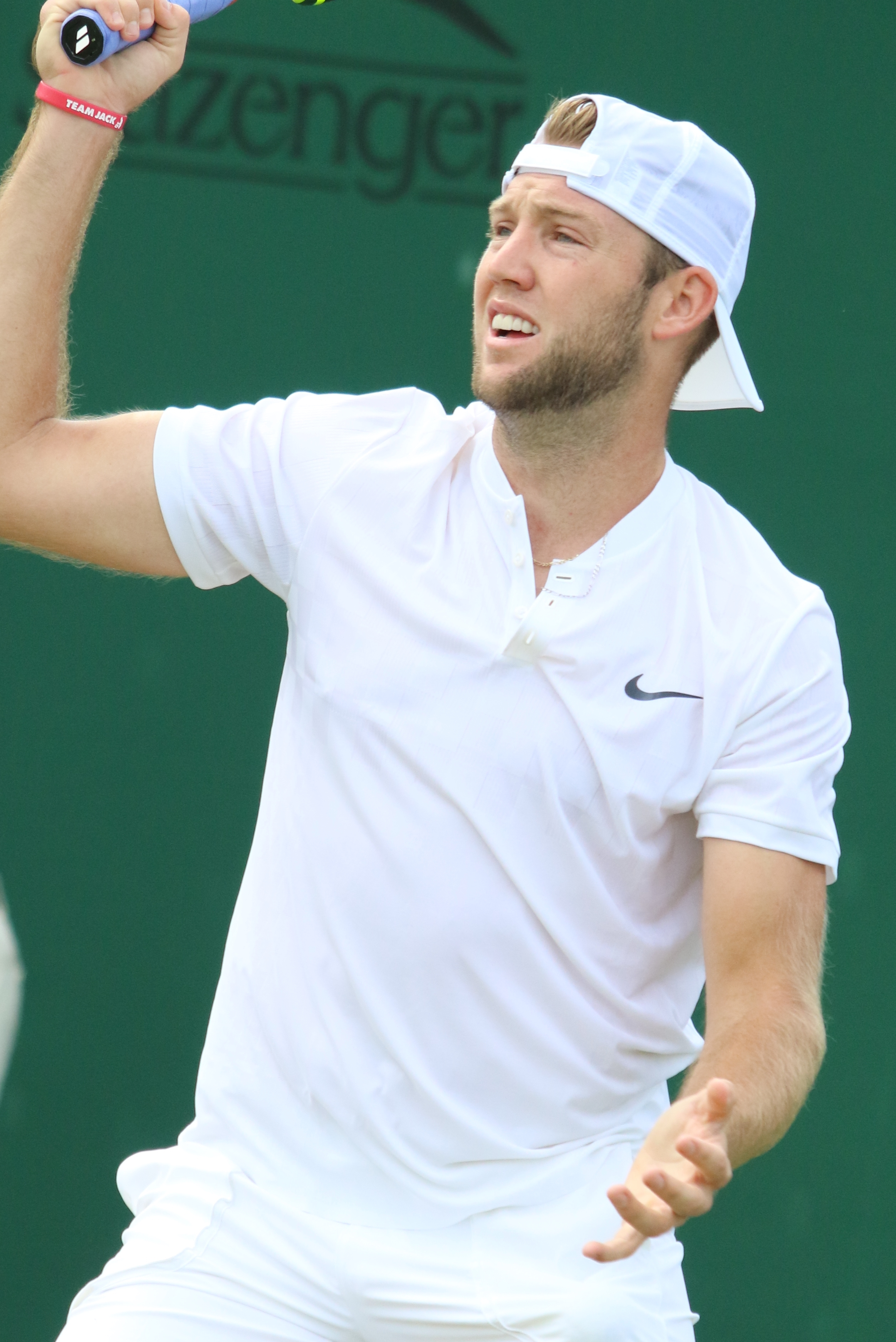
Sock won the Paris Rolex Masters

On November 2 after his Paris Masters title victory, Jack Sock took the last spot.

Jack Sock opened up the season with at the Hopman Cup with CoCo Vandeweghe where they reached the final but lost to the French team of Richard Gasquet and Kristina Mladenovic. He then defended his title at the ASB Classic this time winning the title against João Sousa. With the win, he moved into the top 20 for the first time. Sock finished his stretch down under by making his first appearance in the third round of the Australian Open, where he lost to Jo-Wilfried Tsonga. He then claimed his second title of the year at the Delray Beach Open after Milos Raonic withdrew from the final with a hamstring injury. Sock continued his impressive streak of deep runs in Masters events by reaching his first career Masters semi-final at the Indian Wells Masters losing to Roger Federer. He followed it up with a quarterfinal showing at the Miami Masters before falling to Rafael Nadal. His clay court season began at the U.S. Men's Clay Court Championships losing to compatriot Steve Johnson in the semifinal. At his next clay events, he lost in the first round to Nicolas Mahut at the Mutua Madrid Open, in the third round to Nadal at the Italian Open and to Jiří Veselý in the first round of the French Open.

He only played the Wimbledon Championships and fell to Sebastian Ofner in the second round. He began his hardcourt season at the BB&T Atlanta Open falling to Kyle Edmund in the second round. He then reached the semifinal of the Citi Open before losing to Kevin Anderson. He then suffered a five match losing streak, which began in the second round of the Rogers Cup, when he lost to David Ferrer, followed by first round losses at the Western & Southern Open, US Open, China Open and Shanghai Rolex Masters. He then made the quarterfinals of the Stockholm Open and Swiss Indoors losing to Fabio Fognini and David Goffin, respectively. Sock finished the year strong by winning the biggest tournament of his career at the Rolex Paris Masters, defeating Filip Krajinović in the final. He became the first American to win a Masters event since Andy Roddick won the Miami Masters in 2010, and the first to win the Paris Masters since Andre Agassi in 1999. This result was particularly impressive because Sock was a game away from going out in his first match, when he was down 5–1 to Kyle Edmund in the third set. With the win, Sock also made his debut in the Top 10.

== Points breakdown ==
=== Singles ===
Rank	Player	Grand Slam				ATP World Tour Masters 1000								Best Other						Total points	Tourn
Rank	Player	AUS	FRA	WIM	USO	IW	MI	MA	IT	CA	CI	SH	PA	1	2	3	4	5	6	Total points	Tourn
1	(Spain) Rafael Nadal	F 1200	W 2000	R16; 180	W 2000	R16; 90	F 600	W 1000	QF; 180	R16; 90	QF; 180	F 600	QF; 180	W 1000	W 500	W 500	F 300	QF; 45		10,645	17
2	(Switzerland) Roger Federer	W 2000	A 0	W 2000	QF; 360	W 1000	W 1000	A 0	A 0	F 600	A 0	W 1000	A 0	W 500	W 500	R16; 45	R16; 0			9,005	11
3	(Germany) Alexander Zverev	R32; 90	R128; 10	R16; 180	R64; 45	R32; 45	QF; 180	QF; 180	W 1000	W 1000	R32; 10	R16; 90	R32; 10	W 500	F 300	W 250	W 250	SF; 180	R16; 90	4,410	24
4	(Austria) Dominic Thiem	R16; 180	SF; 720	R16; 180	R16; 180	QF; 180	R64; 10	F 600	SF; 360	R32; 10	QF; 180	R32; 10	R16; 90	W 500	F 300	R16; 90	QF; 90	QF; 90	QF; 45	3,815	26
5	(Croatia) Marin Čilić	R64; 45	QF; 360	F 1200	R32; 90	R64; 10	R64; 10	R32; 10	QF; 180	SF; 90	A 0	SF; 360	QF; 180	F 300	W 250	QF; 180	SF; 180	SF; 180	SF; 180	3,805	20
6	(Bulgaria) Grigor Dimitrov	SF; 720	R32; 90	R16; 180	R64; 45	R32; 45	R64; 10	R16; 90	R64; 10	R16; 90	W 1000	QF; 180	R16; 90	W 250	W 250	SF; 180	SF; 180	F 150	QF; 90	3,650	22
7	(Switzerland) Stan Wawrinka †	SF; 720	F 1200	R128; 10	A 0	F 600	R16; 90	R32; 10	R16; 90	A 0	A 0	A 0	A 0	W 250	R16; 90	SF; 90	R32; 0	R32; 0		3,150	12
8	(Belgium) David Goffin	QF; 360	R32; 90	A 0	R16; 180	R16; 90	R16; 90	QF; 180	R16; 90	R32; 45	R64; 10	R32; 10	R16; 90	W 500	SF; 360	F 300	W 250	SF; 180	F 150	2,975	24
9	(United States) Jack Sock	R32; 90	R128; 10	R64; 45	R128; 10	SF; 360	QF; 180	R64; 10	R16; 90	R32; 45	R64; 10	R64; 10	W 1000	W 250	W 250	SF; 180	QF; 90	SF; 90	QF; 45	2,765	21
Alternates
10	(Spain) Pablo Carreño Busta	R32; 90	QF; 360	A 0	SF; 720	SF; 360	R64; 10	R64; 10	R32; 45	R32; 45	R16; 90	R32; 10	R32; 10	F 300	W 250	R16; 90	SF; 90	SF; 90	R16; 45	2,615	24
11	(Argentina) Juan Martín del Potro §	A 0	R32; 90	R64; 45	SF; 720	R32; 45	R32; 45	R16; 20	QF; 180	R32; 45	R16; 90	SF; 360	QF; 180	F 300	W 250	SF; 90	R16; 45	R16; 45	R16; 45	2,595	19
12	(Serbia) Novak Djokovic §	R64; 45	QF; 360	QF; 360	A 0	R16; 90	A 0	SF; 360	F 600	A 0	A 0	A 0	A 0	W 250	W 250	QF; 180	QF; 90			2,585	10
13	(United States) Sam Querrey	R32; 90	R128; 10	SF; 720	QF; 360	R64; 10	R32; 45	A 0	R16; 90	R16; 90	R32; 45	R16; 90	R32; 10	W 500	W 250	QF; 90	QF; 45	QF; 45	QF; 45	2,535	22

- Ranking points in italics indicate that a player used an exemption to skip (or otherwise did not qualify for) a Masters 1000 event and substituted his next best result in its place.

† Player qualified but withdrew due to injury.

§ Player declined to serve as alternate.

=== Doubles ===
Rank	Team	Points																		Total Points	Tourn
Rank	Team	1	2	3	4	5	6	7	8	9	10	11	12	13	14	15	16	17	18	Total Points	Tourn
1	(Poland) Łukasz Kubot (Brazil) Marcelo Melo	W 2000	W 1000	W 1000	W 1000	F 600	F 600	W 500	SF; 360	F 300	W 250	R16; 180	QF; 180	QF; 180	R32; 90	R32; 90	QF; 90	QF; 90	QF; 90	8,600	22
2	(Finland) Henri Kontinen (Australia) John Peers	W 2000	W 1000	SF; 720	SF; 720	W 500	W 500	SF; 360	QF; 180	QF; 180	QF; 180	QF; 180	QF; 180	QF; 180	SF; 180	R16; 90	QF; 90	QF; 90	R64; 0	7,330	20
3	(Netherlands) Jean-Julien Rojer (Romania) Horia Tecău	W 2000	W 500	SF; 360	SF; 360	W 250	W 250	R16; 180	R16; 180	QF; 180	QF; 180	SF; 180	SF; 180	R16; 90	R16; 90	QF; 90	QF; 90	QF; 90	QF; 45	5,295	26
4	(United Kingdom) Jamie Murray (Brazil) Bruno Soares	F 600	W 500	W 500	QF; 360	QF; 360	SF; 360	SF; 360	SF; 360	F 300	W 250	QF; 180	QF; 180	QF; 180	SF; 180	SF; 180	F 150	R32; 90	QF; 90	5,180	23
5	(United States) Bob Bryan (United States) Mike Bryan	F 1200	SF; 720	SF; 360	SF; 360	W 250	W 250	QF; 180	QF; 180	QF; 180	QF; 180	SF; 180	R32; 90	R32; 90	QF; 90	QF; 90	SF; 90	SF; 90	QF; 45	4,625	21
6	(France) Pierre-Hugues Herbert (France) Nicolas Mahut	W 1000	W 1000	W 1000	QF; 360	SF; 360	QF; 180	SF; 180	R32; 90	R16; 90	R16; 90	QF; 45	R64; 0	R64; 0	R16; 0	R16; 0				4,395	15
7	(Croatia) Ivan Dodig (Spain) Marcel Granollers	F 600	F 600	W 500	W 500	QF; 360	QF; 360	R16; 180	R16; 180	QF; 180	QF; 180	QF; 180	QF; 180	SF; 90	R32; 0	R16; 0	R16; 0	R16; 0		4,090	17
8	(United States) Ryan Harrison (New Zealand) Michael Venus	W 2000	QF; 360	SF; 360	W 250	R16; 90	QF; 90	R64; 0	R32; 0	R16; 0	R16; 0	R16; 0	R16; 0	R16; 0	R16; 0	R16; 0				3,150	15
Alternates
9	(Austria) Oliver Marach (Croatia) Mate Pavić	F 1200	SF; 360	W 250	R16; 180	QF; 180	SF; 180	F 150	F 150	R32; 90	R16; 90	R16; 90	SF; 90	QF; 45	QF; 45	R32; 0	R16; 0	R16; 0	R16; 0	3,100	18
10	(South Africa) Raven Klaasen (United States) Rajeev Ram	W 1000	SF; 360	W 250	R16; 180	QF; 180	QF; 180	SF; 180	F 150	R32; 90	R32; 90	QF; 90	QF; 90	SF; 90	QF; 45	QF; 45	R32; 0	R32; 0	R32; 0	3,020	22

== Head-to-head ==
2017 ATP Finals – Singles

=== Overall head-to-head ===
		Nadal	Federer	Zverev	Thiem	Čilić	Dimitrov	Goffin	Sock	Overall	YTD W–L
1	Rafael Nadal (ESP)		23–15	3–0	5–2	5–1	10–1	2–0	4–0	52–19	67–10
2	Roger Federer (SUI)	15–23		2–2	1–2	7–1	6–0	6–0	3–0	40–28	49–4
3	Alexander Zverev (GER)	0–3	2–2		1–4	3–1	2–1	1–0	1–1	10–12	54–20
4	Dominic Thiem (AUT)	2–5	2–1	4–1		1–0	2–1	3–6	2–1	16–15	48–25
5	Marin Čilić (CRO)	1–5	1–7	1–3	0–1		3–1	2–3	0–2	8–22	44–19
6	Grigor Dimitrov (BUL)	1–10	0–6	1–2	1–2	1–3		3–1	1–3	8–27	44–19
7	David Goffin (BEL)	0–2	0–6	0–1	6–3	3–2	1–3		3–0	13–17	54–22
8	Jack Sock (USA)	0–4	0–3	1–1	1–2	2–0	3–1	0–3		7–14	36–19

=== Indoor hardcourt head-to-head ===
		Nadal	Federer	Zverev	Thiem	Čilić	Dimitrov	Goffin	Sock	Overall	YTD W–L
1	Rafael Nadal (ESP)		1–5	0–0	0–0	1–0	2–0	0–0	0–0	4–5	2–0
2	Roger Federer (SUI)	5–1		0–0	0–0	1–0	2–0	3–0	1–0	12–1	5–0
3	Alexander Zverev (GER)	0–0	0–0		0–1	1–0	0–1	0–0	0–1	1–3	7–5
4	Dominic Thiem (AUT)	0–0	0–0	1–0		0–0	0–0	1–1	0–1	2–2	4–4
5	Marin Čilić (CRO)	0–1	0–1	0–1	0–0		0–1	1–0	0–0	1–4	7–4
6	Grigor Dimitrov (BUL)	0–2	0–2	1–0	0–0	1–0		1–1	1–0	4–5	10–3
7	David Goffin (BEL)	0–0	0–3	0–0	1–1	0–1	1–1		1–0	3–6	17–6
8	Jack Sock (USA)	0–0	0–1	1–0	1–0	0–0	0–1	0–1		2–3	9–2

2017 ATP Finals – Doubles

		Kubot; Melo	Kontinen; Peers	Rojer; Tecău	Murray; Soares	Bryan; Bryan	Herbert; Mahut	Dodig; Granollers	Harrison; Venus	Overall
1	Łukasz Kubot (POL) / Marcelo Melo (BRA)		1–3	4–0	3–1	2–0	0–0	2–1	0–1	12–6
2	Henri Kontinen (FIN) / John Peers (AUS)	3–1		2–2	4–1	3–0	2–1	1–2	1–1	16–8
3	Jean-Julien Rojer (NED) / Horia Tecău (ROU)	0–4	2–2		2–2	3–4	2–1	1–2	0–0	10–15
4	Jamie Murray (GBR) / Bruno Soares (BRA)	1–3	1–4	2–2		1–1	2–2	0–0	2–0	9–12
5	Bob Bryan (USA) / Mike Bryan (USA)	0–2	0–3	4–3	1–1		0–5	1–0	0–0	6–14
6	Pierre-Hugues Herbert (FRA) / Nicolas Mahut (FRA)	0–0	1–2	1–2	2–2	5–0		2–1	1–0	12–7
7	Ivan Dodig (CRO) / Marcel Granollers (ESP)	1–2	2–1	2–1	0–0	0–1	1–2		0–2	6–9
8	Ryan Harrison (USA) / Michael Venus (NZL)	1–0	1–1	0–0	0–2	0–0	0–1	2–0		4–4

== See also ==
- ATP rankings
- 2017 WTA Finals
- 2017 WTA Elite Trophy
- 2017 Next Generation ATP Finals
