= 2017 ABN AMRO World Tennis Tournament – Doubles =

Doubles
- 2017 ABN AMRO World Tennis Tournament

Final
- Champions: (Croatia) Ivan Dodig (Spain) Marcel Granollers
- Runners-up: (Netherlands) Wesley Koolhof (Netherlands) Matwé Middelkoop
- Score: 7–6^{(7–5)}, 6–3

Events
| Singles | Doubles |
| ← 2016 · | ABN AMRO World Tennis Tournament | · 2018 → |

Nicolas Mahut and Vasek Pospisil were the defending champions, but Pospisil chose not to participate this year. Mahut played alongside Pierre-Hugues Herbert, but lost in the semifinals to Ivan Dodig and Marcel Granollers.

Dodig and Granollers went on to win the title, defeating Wesley Koolhof and Matwé Middelkoop in the final, 7–6^{(7–5)}, 6–3.

== Seeds ==
1. (France) Pierre-Hugues Herbert / (France) Nicolas Mahut (semifinals)
2. (Spain) Feliciano López / (Spain) Marc López (quarterfinals)
3. (Croatia) Ivan Dodig / (Spain) Marcel Granollers (champions)
4. (Poland) Łukasz Kubot / (Brazil) Marcelo Melo (quarterfinals)

== Draw ==
=== Key ===
- Q = Qualifier
- WC = Wild card
- LL = Lucky loser
- Alt = Alternate
- SE = Special exempt
- PR = Protected ranking
- ITF = ITF entry
- JE = Junior exempt
- w/o = Walkover
- r = Retired
- d = Defaulted
- SR = Special ranking

=== Draw ===
First round
1 | (France) P-H Herbert (France) N Mahut | 6 | 7
(Croatia) M Čilić (Serbia) N Zimonjić | 4 | 5
(Germany) P Kohlschreiber (Austria) D Thiem | 2 | 1
(Croatia) M Pavić (Austria) A Peya | 6 | 6
3 | (Croatia) I Dodig (Spain) M Granollers | 7 | 6
(Bulgaria) G Dimitrov (France) L Pouille | 5 | 1
(Czech Republic) T Berdych (India) R Bopanna | 6 | 6
WC | (Netherlands) R Haase (Netherlands) G Smits | 2 | 2
(Germany) A Zverev (Germany) M Zverev | 3 | 4
WC | (Netherlands) W Koolhof (Netherlands) M Middelkoop | 6 | 6
(Belgium) D Goffin (Spain) F Verdasco | 1 | 6^{4}
4 | (Poland) Ł Kubot (Brazil) M Melo | 6 | 7^{7}
(Canada) D Nestor (France) É Roger-Vasselin | 7^{7} | 3 | [9]
(Netherlands) J-J Rojer (Romania) H Tecău | 6^{4} | 6 | [11]
Q | (Netherlands) T Griekspoor (Netherlands) N Lootsma | 5 | 2
2 | (Spain) F López (Spain) M López | 7 | 6

Quarterfinals
1 | (France) P-H Herbert (France) N Mahut | 4 | 7^{8} | [10]
(Croatia) M Pavić (Austria) A Peya | 6 | 6^{6} | [6]
3 | (Croatia) I Dodig (Spain) M Granollers | 6 | 6
(Czech Republic) T Berdych (India) R Bopanna | 3 | 4
WC | (Netherlands) W Koolhof (Netherlands) M Middelkoop | 7^{7} | 6
4 | (Poland) Ł Kubot (Brazil) M Melo | 6^{2} | 3
(Netherlands) J-J Rojer (Romania) H Tecău | 6 | 6
2 | (Spain) F López (Spain) M López | 4 | 4

Semifinals
1 | (France) P-H Herbert (France) N Mahut | 3 | 4
3 | (Croatia) I Dodig (Spain) M Granollers | 6 | 6
WC | (Netherlands) W Koolhof (Netherlands) M Middelkoop | 6 | 6
(Netherlands) J-J Rojer (Romania) H Tecău | 4 | 3

Final
3 | (Croatia) I Dodig (Spain) M Granollers | 7^{7} | 6
WC | (Netherlands) W Koolhof (Netherlands) M Middelkoop | 6^{5} | 3

== Qualifying ==
=== Seeds ===
1. (United Kingdom) Dominic Inglot / (Romania) Florin Mergea (qualifying competition)
2. (Germany) Philipp Petzschner / (Pakistan) Aisam-ul-Haq Qureshi (first round)

=== Qualifiers ===
1. (Netherlands) Tallon Griekspoor / (Netherlands) Niels Lootsma

=== Qualifying draw ===
First round
1 | (United Kingdom) Dominic Inglot (Romania) Florin Mergea | 6 | 6
PR | (Germany) Andre Begemann (Germany) Jan-Lennard Struff | 3 | 3
WC | (Netherlands) Tallon Griekspoor (Netherlands) Niels Lootsma | 6 | 3 | [10]
2 | (Germany) Philipp Petzschner (Pakistan) Aisam-ul-Haq Qureshi | 4 | 6 | [8]

Qualifying competition
1 | (United Kingdom) Dominic Inglot (Romania) Florin Mergea | 6 | 3 | [11]
WC | (Netherlands) Tallon Griekspoor (Netherlands) Niels Lootsma | 4 | 6 | [13]
