= 2017 Grand Prix Hassan II – Singles =

Singles
- 2017 Grand Prix Hassan II

Final
- Champion: (Croatia) Borna Ćorić
- Runner-up: (Germany) Philipp Kohlschreiber
- Score: 5–7, 7–6^{(7–3)}, 7–5

Details
- Draw: 28 (4 Q / 3 WC )
- Seeds: 8

Events
Singles	Doubles
- Grand Prix Hassan II

Federico Delbonis was the defending champion but retired in the first round against Reda El Amrani.

Borna Ćorić won his first ATP title, defeating Philipp Kohlschreiber in the final, 5–7, 7–6^{(7–3)}, 7–5.

== Seeds ==
The top four seeds receive a bye into the second round.

1. (Bulgaria) Grigor Dimitrov (second round)
2. (Spain) Albert Ramos Viñolas (quarterfinals)
3. (Germany) Philipp Kohlschreiber (final)
4. (Germany) Mischa Zverev (second round)
5. (Italy) Paolo Lorenzi (quarterfinals)
6. (France) Benoît Paire (semifinals)
7. (Argentina) Diego Schwartzman (first round)
8. (Spain) Marcel Granollers (first round)

== Draw ==
Key

- Q = Qualifier
- WC = Wild card
- LL = Lucky loser
- Alt = Alternate
- ITF = ITF entry
- PR = Protected ranking
- SR = Special ranking
- SE = Special exempt
- JE = Junior exempt
- JR = Junior Accelerator Programme entrant
- CO = College Accelerator Programme entrant
- NG = Next Gen Accelerator Program entrant
- w/o = Walkover
- r = Retired
- d = Defaulted

=== Finals ===
Semifinals
6	(France) Benoît Paire	2	2
3	(Germany) Philipp Kohlschreiber	6	6
(Czech Republic) Jiří Veselý	4	4
(Croatia) Borna Ćorić	6	6

Final
3	(Germany) Philipp Kohlschreiber	7	6^{3}	5
(Croatia) Borna Ćorić	5	7^{7}	7

=== Top half ===
First round
PR	(Spain) T Robredo	6	6
Q	(Ukraine) S Stakhovsky	4	4
(Moldova) R Albot	7^{8}	6
(Spain) N Almagro	6^{6}	3
(Argentina) C Berlocq	7^{7}	3	2
6	(France) B Paire	6^{0}	6	6
(Tunisia) M Jaziri	2	6	3
(France) J Chardy	6	4	6
Q	(Japan) T Daniel	6	3	1
(Germany) J-L Struff	4	6	6
WC	(Morocco) A Ahouda	6	6
8	(Spain) M Granollers	4	4

Second round
1/WC	(Bulgaria) G Dimitrov	4	6	1
PR	(Spain) T Robredo	6	1	6
(Moldova) R Albot	2	2
6	(France) B Paire	6	6
3	(Germany) P Kohlschreiber	6	2	6
(France) J Chardy	0	6	3
(Germany) J-L Struff	6	6
WC	(Morocco) A Ahouda	3	4

Quarterfinals
PR	(Spain) T Robredo	2	4
6	(France) B Paire	6	6
3	(Germany) P Kohlschreiber	3	7	6
(Germany) J-L Struff	6	5	3

Semifinals
6	(France) B Paire	2	2
3	(Germany) P Kohlschreiber	6	6

=== Bottom half ===
First round
5	(Italy) P Lorenzi	7^{7}	7
(Spain) G García López	6^{4}	5
(France) P-H Mathieu	6^{8}	3
Q	(Italy) G Quinzi	7^{10}	6
LL	(Italy) L Vanni	2	3
(Czech Republic) J Veselý	6	6
7	(Argentina) D Schwartzman	3	2
(Croatia) B Ćorić	6	6
WC	(Morocco) R El Amrani	7^{7}	1
(Argentina) F Delbonis	6^{3}	0^{r}
(Slovakia) M Kližan	6^{3}	3
Q	(Serbia) L Đere	7^{7}	6

Second round
5	(Italy) P Lorenzi	7^{7}	2	6
Q	(Italy) G Quinzi	6^{5}	6	4
(Czech Republic) J Veselý	6	6
4	(Germany) M Zverev	4	4
(Croatia) B Ćorić	6	3	7^{7}
WC	(Morocco) R El Amrani	2	6	6^{5}
Q	(Serbia) L Đere	7^{7}	1	4
2	(Spain) A Ramos Viñolas	6^{4}	6	6

Quarterfinals
5	(Italy) P Lorenzi	6	3	6^{5}
(Czech Republic) J Veselý	3	6	7^{7}
(Croatia) B Ćorić	4	6	6
2	(Spain) A Ramos Viñolas	6	4	4

Semifinals
(Czech Republic) J Veselý	4	4
(Croatia) B Ćorić	6	6

== Qualifying ==
=== Seeds ===
1. (Japan) Taro Daniel (qualified)
2. (Russia) Evgeny Donskoy (first round)
3. (Romania) Marius Copil (first round, retired)
4. (Ukraine) Sergiy Stakhovsky (qualified)
5. (Russia) Andrey Rublev (first round)
6. (Spain) Roberto Carballés Baena (first round)
7. (Italy) Luca Vanni (qualifying competition, lucky loser)
8. (South Korea) Lee Duck-hee (qualifying competition)

=== Qualifiers ===
1. (Japan) Taro Daniel
2. (Italy) Gianluigi Quinzi
3. (Serbia) Laslo Đere
4. (Ukraine) Sergiy Stakhovsky

=== Lucky loser ===
1. (Italy) Luca Vanni

=== Qualifying draw ===
==== First qualifier ====
First round
1	(Japan) Taro Daniel	6	6
WC	(Morocco) Taha Tifnouti	0	1
(Spain) Íñigo Cervantes	7^{10}	5	5
7	(Italy) Luca Vanni	6^{8}	7	7

Qualifying competition
1	(Japan) Taro Daniel	7^{7}	7^{7}
7	(Italy) Luca Vanni	6^{4}	6^{2}

==== Second qualifier ====
First round
2	(Russia) Evgeny Donskoy	6^{3}	6	3
(Italy) Gianluigi Quinzi	7^{7}	3	6
(Russia) Alexander Zhurbin	3	1
8	(South Korea) Lee Duck-hee	6	6

Qualifying competition
(Italy) Gianluigi Quinzi	6	6
8	(South Korea) Lee Duck-hee	2	3

==== Third qualifier ====
First round
3	(Romania) Marius Copil	1	0^{r}
(Serbia) Laslo Đere	6	0
(United Kingdom) Alexander Ward	7^{7}	6
5	(Russia) Andrey Rublev	6^{5}	4

Qualifying competition
(Serbia) Laslo Đere	6	6
(United Kingdom) Alexander Ward	4	2

==== Fourth qualifier ====
First round
4	(Ukraine) Sergiy Stakhovsky	6	6
WC	(Morocco) Ayoub Chakrouni	0	2
(Kazakhstan) Alexander Bublik	6	6
6	(Spain) Roberto Carballés Baena	4	4

Qualifying competition
4	(Ukraine) Sergiy Stakhovsky	7	6
(Kazakhstan) Alexander Bublik	5	0
