= 2017 ABN AMRO World Tennis Tournament – Singles =

Singles
- 2017 ABN AMRO World Tennis Tournament

Final
- Champion: (France) Jo-Wilfried Tsonga
- Runner-up: (Belgium) David Goffin
- Score: 4–6, 6–4, 6–1

Details
- Draw: 32 (4 Q / 3 WC )
- Seeds: 8

Events
Singles	Doubles
- ABN AMRO World Tennis Tournament

Martin Kližan was the defending champion but lost in the quarterfinals to Tomáš Berdych.

Jo-Wilfried Tsonga won the title, defeating David Goffin in the final, 4–6, 6–4, 6–1.

== Seeds ==
1. (Croatia) Marin Čilić (quarterfinals)
2. (Austria) Dominic Thiem (quarterfinals)
3. (Belgium) David Goffin (final)
4. (Czech Republic) Tomáš Berdych (semifinals)
5. (Bulgaria) Grigor Dimitrov (quarterfinals)
6. (France) Jo-Wilfried Tsonga (champion)
7. (Spain) Roberto Bautista Agut (withdrew)
8. (France) Lucas Pouille (first round)

== Draw ==
Key

- Q = Qualifier
- WC = Wild card
- LL = Lucky loser
- Alt = Alternate
- ITF = ITF entry
- PR = Protected ranking
- SR = Special ranking
- SE = Special exempt
- JE = Junior exempt
- JR = Junior Accelerator Programme entrant
- CO = College Accelerator Programme entrant
- NG = Next Gen Accelerator Program entrant
- w/o = Walkover
- r = Retired
- d = Defaulted

=== Finals ===
Semifinals
6	(France) Jo-Wilfried Tsonga	6	6
4	(Czech Republic) Tomáš Berdych	3	4
3	(Belgium) David Goffin	6	6
Q	(France) Pierre-Hugues Herbert	1	3

Final
6	(France) Jo-Wilfried Tsonga	4	6	6
3	(Belgium) David Goffin	6	4	1

=== Top half ===
First round
1	(Croatia) M Čilić	5	6	6
(France) B Paire	7	3	2
(Croatia) B Ćorić	7^{8}	7^{12}
(Russia) K Khachanov	6^{6}	6^{10}
WC	(Netherlands) T Griekspoor	3	2
(Luxembourg) G Müller	6	6
WC	(Greece) S Tsitsipas	4	6^{2}
6	(France) J-W Tsonga	6	7^{7}
4	(Czech Republic) T Berdych	7^{7}	6
Q	(Romania) M Copil	6^{3}	4
(Serbia) V Troicki	4	2
(France) R Gasquet	6	6
(Slovakia) M Kližan	6	0	6
(Spain) F Verdasco	4	6	1
(Germany) P Kohlschreiber	7	6
8	(France) L Pouille	5	2

Second round
1	(Croatia) M Čilić	6	2	6
(Croatia) B Ćorić	1	6	4
(Luxembourg) G Müller	4	2
6	(France) J-W Tsonga	6	6
4	(Czech Republic) T Berdych	7^{7}	6
(France) R Gasquet	6^{4}	1
(Slovakia) M Kližan	6^{5}	6	6
(Germany) P Kohlschreiber	7^{7}	4	1

Quarterfinals
1	(Croatia) M Čilić	6^{8}	6^{5}
6	(France) J-W Tsonga	7^{10}	7^{7}
4	(Czech Republic) T Berdych	6	6
(Slovakia) M Kližan	3	3

Semifinals
6	(France) J-W Tsonga	6	6
4	(Czech Republic) T Berdych	3	4

=== Bottom half ===
First round
5	(Bulgaria) G Dimitrov	6^{4}	6	6
(Germany) M Zverev	7^{7}	2	4
LL	(Uzbekistan) D Istomin	6	7^{7}
Q	(United Kingdom) A Bedene	3	6^{3}
WC	(Netherlands) R Haase	7	7
(Germany) F Mayer	5	6^{5}
(Russia) A Kuznetsov	3	2
3	(Belgium) D Goffin	6	6
Q	(Russia) E Donskoy	6	6
(Spain) M Granollers	4	4
(Spain) F López	6^{5}	6^{5}
Q	(France) P-H Herbert	7^{7}	7^{7}
(France) N Mahut	6	3	4
(France) G Simon	3	6	6
(Germany) A Zverev	6	3	4
2	(Austria) D Thiem	3	6	6

Second round
5	(Bulgaria) G Dimitrov	7^{9}	6
LL	(Uzbekistan) D Istomin	6^{7}	1
WC	(Netherlands) R Haase	7	4	4
3	(Belgium) D Goffin	5	6	6
Q	(Russia) E Donskoy	2	6^{4}
Q	(France) P-H Herbert	6	7^{7}
(France) G Simon	4	6^{4}
2	(Austria) D Thiem	6	7^{7}

Quarterfinals
5	(Bulgaria) G Dimitrov	4	6	3
3	(Belgium) D Goffin	6	1	6
Q	(France) P-H Herbert	6	7^{7}
2	(Austria) D Thiem	4	6^{3}

Semifinals
3	(Belgium) D Goffin	6	6
Q	(France) P-H Herbert	1	3

== Qualifying ==
=== Seeds ===
1. (Germany) Jan-Lennard Struff (qualifying competition)
2. (Uzbekistan) Denis Istomin (qualifying competition, lucky loser)
3. (Russia) Mikhail Youzhny (first round, retired)
4. (France) Pierre-Hugues Herbert (qualified)
5. (Ukraine) Sergiy Stakhovsky (first round)
6. (United Kingdom) Aljaž Bedene (qualified)
7. (Russia) Andrey Rublev (first round)
8. (Germany) Tobias Kamke (first round)

=== Qualifiers ===
1. (Romania) Marius Copil
2. (United Kingdom) Aljaž Bedene
3. (Russia) Evgeny Donskoy
4. (France) Pierre-Hugues Herbert

=== Lucky loser ===
1. (Uzbekistan) Denis Istomin

=== Qualifying draw ===
==== First qualifier ====
First round
1	(Germany) Jan-Lennard Struff	6	6
(Spain) Albert Montañés	1	0
(Romania) Marius Copil	6^{1}	7^{7}	6
8	(Germany) Tobias Kamke	7^{7}	6^{3}	1

Qualifying competition
1	(Germany) Jan-Lennard Struff	3	4
(Romania) Marius Copil	6	6

==== Second qualifier ====
First round				Qualifying competition
				2	(Uzbekistan) Denis Istomin	6^{8}	3
WC	(Netherlands) Niels Lootsma	3	3	6	(United Kingdom) Aljaž Bedene	7^{10}	6
6	(United Kingdom) Aljaž Bedene	6	6

==== Third qualifier ====
First round
3	(Russia) Mikhail Youzhny	3	0^{r}
(Russia) Evgeny Donskoy	6	3
PR	(Latvia) Ernests Gulbis	6^{6}	7	6
5	(Ukraine) Sergiy Stakhovsky	7^{8}	5	3

Qualifying competition
(Russia) Evgeny Donskoy	6^{5}	7^{7}	7^{12}
PR	(Latvia) Ernests Gulbis	7^{7}	6^{4}	6^{10}

==== Fourth qualifier ====
First round
4	(France) Pierre-Hugues Herbert	6^{7}	6	7
(Belgium) Ruben Bemelmans	7^{9}	4	5
WC	(Netherlands) Botic van de Zandschulp	1	6	6
7	(Russia) Andrey Rublev	6	4	3

Qualifying competition
4	(France) Pierre-Hugues Herbert	7^{7}	6
WC	(Netherlands) Botic van de Zandschulp	6^{3}	4
