= 2017 ATP Finals – Singles =

Singles
- 2017 ATP Finals

Final
- Champion: (Bulgaria) Grigor Dimitrov
- Runner-up: (Belgium) David Goffin
- Score: 7–5, 4–6, 6–3

Events
Singles	Doubles
- ATP Finals

Grigor Dimitrov defeated David Goffin in the final, 7–5, 4–6, 6–3 to win the singles tennis title at the 2017 ATP Finals. Dimitrov became the first debutant to win the title since Àlex Corretja in 1998, and it marked the first time since 2008 that two first-time finalists contested the final.

Andy Murray was the reigning champion, but did not qualify for the event this year due to injury. This marked the first time since 2013 that he did not participate in the tournament.

Of the nine participants from the previous year, only Marin Čilić, Dominic Thiem and Goffin returned this year. Stan Wawrinka qualified but did not participate due to injury. Former world No. 1 and five-time champion Novak Djokovic failed to qualify for the first time since 2006, having ended his season early due to an elbow injury.

Future world No. 1 and two-time champion Alexander Zverev, Dimitrov, Jack Sock and Pablo Carreño Busta (as an alternate replacing Rafael Nadal) made their debuts. Goffin made his debut as a direct qualifier, after playing one match as an alternate in 2016.

Roger Federer participated in the Tour Finals for a record-extending 15th time, but was defeated in the semifinals by Goffin. Goffin became only the fifth player in history to defeat both Nadal and Federer at the same tournament (defeating Nadal in the round-robin stage).

== Seeds ==
1. (Spain) Rafael Nadal (round robin, withdrew due to knee injury)
2. (Switzerland) Roger Federer (semifinals)
3. (Germany) Alexander Zverev (round robin)
4. (Austria) Dominic Thiem (round robin)
5. (Croatia) Marin Čilić (round robin)
6. (Bulgaria) Grigor Dimitrov (champion)
7. (Belgium) David Goffin (final)
8. (United States) Jack Sock (semifinals)

== Alternates ==
1. (Spain) Pablo Carreño Busta (replaced Nadal, round robin)
2. (United States) Sam Querrey (Did not play)

== Draw ==
Key

- Q = Qualifier
- WC = Wild card
- LL = Lucky loser
- Alt = Alternate
- ITF = ITF entry
- PR = Protected ranking
- SR = Special ranking
- SE = Special exempt
- JE = Junior exempt
- JR = Junior Accelerator Programme entrant
- CO = College Accelerator Programme entrant
- NG = Next Gen Accelerator Program entrant
- w/o = Walkover
- r = Retired
- d = Defaulted

=== Finals ===
Semifinals
6	(Bulgaria) Grigor Dimitrov	4	6	6
8	(United States) Jack Sock	6	0	3
2	(Switzerland) Roger Federer	6	3	4
7	(Belgium) David Goffin	2	6	6

Final
6	(Bulgaria) Grigor Dimitrov	7	4	6
7	(Belgium) David Goffin	5	6	3

=== Group Pete Sampras ===
		(Spain) Nadal (Spain) Carreño Busta	(Austria) Thiem	(Bulgaria) Dimitrov	(Belgium) Goffin	RR W–L	Set W–L	Game W–L	Standings
1; 9	(Spain) Rafael Nadal (Spain) Pablo Carreño Busta		3–6, 6–3, 4–6 (w/ Carreño Busta)	1–6, 1–6 (w/ Carreño Busta)	6–7^{(5–7)}, 7–6^{(7–4)}, 4–6 (w/ Nadal)	0–1; 0–2	1–2 (33.3%); 1–4 (20%)	17–19 (47.2%); 15–27 (35.7%)	X 4
4	(Austria) Dominic Thiem	6–3, 3–6, 6–4 (w/ Carreño Busta)		3–6, 7–5, 5–7	4–6, 1–6	1–2	3–5 (37.5%)	35–43 (44.9%)	3
6	(Bulgaria) Grigor Dimitrov	6–1, 6–1 (w/ Carreño Busta)	6–3, 5–7, 7–5		6–0, 6–2	3–0	6–1 (85.7%)	42–19 (68.8%)	1
7	(Belgium) David Goffin	7–6^{(7–5)}, 6–7^{(4–7)}, 6–4 (w/ Nadal)	6–4, 6–1	0–6, 2–6		2–1	4–3 (57.1%)	33–34 (49.2%)	2

Standings are determined by: 1. number of wins; 2. number of matches; 3. in two-players-ties, head-to-head records; 4. in three-players-ties, percentage of sets won, then percentage of games won, then head-to-head records; 5. ATP rankings.

=== Group Boris Becker ===
		(Switzerland) Federer	(Germany) Zverev	(Croatia) Čilić	(United States) Sock	RR W–L	Set W–L	Game W–L	Standings
2	(Switzerland) Roger Federer		7–6^{(8–6)}, 5–7, 6–1	6–7^{(5–7)}, 6–4, 6–1	6–4, 7–6^{(7–4)}	3–0	6–2 (75%)	49–36 (57.6%)	1
3	(Germany) Alexander Zverev	6–7^{(6–8)}, 7–5, 1–6		6–4, 3–6, 6–4	4–6, 6–1, 4–6	1–2	4–5 (44.4%)	43–45 (48.9%)	3
5	(Croatia) Marin Čilić	7–6^{(7–5)}, 4–6, 1–6	4–6, 6–3, 4–6		7–5, 2–6, 6–7^{(4–7)}	0–3	3–6 (33.3%)	41–51 (44.6%)	4
8	(United States) Jack Sock	4–6, 6–7^{(4–7)}	6–4, 1–6, 6–4	5–7, 6–2, 7–6^{(7–4)}		2–1	4–4 (50%)	41–42 (49.4%)	2

Standings are determined by: 1. number of wins; 2. number of matches; 3. in two-players-ties, head-to-head records; 4. in three-players-ties, percentage of sets won, then percentage of games won, then head-to-head records; 5. ATP rankings.
