= 2017 Erste Bank Open =

- Date: 23–29 October
- Edition: 43rd
- Category: ATP World Tour 500 Series
- Draw: 32S / 16D
- Prize money: €2,035,415
- Surface: Hard
- Location: Vienna, Austria
- Venue: Wiener Stadthalle

Champions

Singles
- (France) Lucas Pouille

Doubles
- (India) Rohan Bopanna / (Uruguay) Pablo Cuevas
- Vienna Open

The 2017 Erste Bank Open 500 was a men's tennis tournament played on indoor hard courts. It was the 43rd edition of the event, and part of the ATP World Tour 500 Series of the 2017 ATP World Tour. It was held at the Wiener Stadthalle in Vienna, Austria, from 23 October until 29 October 2017. Unseeded Lucas Pouille won the singles title.

== Points and prize money ==
=== Point distribution ===
Event	W	F	SF	QF	Round of 16	Round of 32	Q	Q2	Q1
Singles	500	300	180	90	45	0	20	10	0
Doubles	500	300	180	90	0	—N/a	—N/a	—N/a	—N/a

=== Prize money ===
Event	W	F	SF	QF	Round of 16	Round of 32	Q2	Q1
Singles	€438,505	€214,980	€108,175	€55,010	€28,570	€15,070	€3,335	€1,700
Doubles	€132,030	€64,640	€32,420	€16,640	€8,600	—N/a	—N/a	—N/a

== Singles main-draw entrants ==
=== Seeds ===
Country	Player	Rank^{1}	Seed
GER	Alexander Zverev	5	1
AUT	Dominic Thiem	6	2
BUL	~~Grigor Dimitrov~~	~~8~~	~~3~~
ESP	Pablo Carreño Busta	11	4
USA	John Isner	13	5
USA	Sam Querrey	14	6
RSA	Kevin Anderson	16	7
FRA	Jo-Wilfried Tsonga	17	8

- Rankings are as of October 16, 2017

=== Other entrants ===
The following players received wildcards into the singles main draw:

- (Latvia) Ernests Gulbis
- (Austria) Sebastian Ofner

The following player received entry as a special exempt:

- (Lithuania) Ričardas Berankis

The following players received entry from the qualifying draw:

- (Spain) Guillermo García López
- (France) Pierre-Hugues Herbert
- (Austria) Dennis Novak
- (Argentina) Guido Pella

The following players entered as a lucky loser:

- (Italy) Thomas Fabbiano

=== Withdrawals ===
- (Czech Republic) Tomáš Berdych →replaced by (United Kingdom) Kyle Edmund
- (Bulgaria) Grigor Dimitrov →replaced by (Italy) Thomas Fabbiano
- (Croatia) Ivo Karlović →replaced by (Bosnia and Herzegovina) Damir Džumhur
- (France) Gaël Monfils →replaced by (Russia) Andrey Rublev
- (Canada) Milos Raonic →replaced by (Germany) Philipp Kohlschreiber

== Doubles main-draw entrants ==
=== Seeds ===
Country	Player	Country	Player	Rank^{1}	Seed
POL	Łukasz Kubot	BRA	Marcelo Melo	7	1
USA	Bob Bryan	USA	Mike Bryan	14	2
GBR	Jamie Murray	BRA	Bruno Soares	19	3
NED	Jean-Julien Rojer	ROU	Horia Tecău	23	4

- Rankings are as of October 16, 2017

=== Other entrants ===
The following pairs received wildcards into the doubles main draw:

- (Germany) Philipp Kohlschreiber / (Belarus) Max Mirnyi
- (Austria) Philipp Oswald / (Austria) Alexander Peya

The following pair received entry from the qualifying draw:

- (Spain) Pablo Carreño Busta / (Spain) David Marrero

=== Withdrawals ===
During the tournament

- (Austria) Oliver Marach

== Finals ==
=== Singles ===
- (France) Lucas Pouille defeated (France) Jo-Wilfried Tsonga, 6–1, 6–4.

=== Doubles ===
- (India) Rohan Bopanna / (Uruguay) Pablo Cuevas defeated (Brazil) Marcelo Demoliner / (United States) Sam Querrey, 7–6^{(9–7)}, 6–7^{(4–7)}, [11–9]
