= 2017 Erste Bank Open – Doubles =

Doubles
- 2017 Erste Bank Open

Final
- Champions: (India) Rohan Bopanna (Uruguay) Pablo Cuevas
- Runners-up: (Brazil) Marcelo Demoliner (United States) Sam Querrey
- Score: 7–6^{(9–7)}, 6–7^{(4–7)}, [11–9]

Details
- Draw: 16
- Seeds: 4

Events
Singles	Doubles
← 2016 ·	Vienna Open	· 2018 →

Łukasz Kubot and Marcelo Melo were the two time defending champions, but lost in the quarterfinals to Rohan Bopanna and Pablo Cuevas.

Bopanna and Cuevas went on to win the title, defeating Marcelo Demoliner and Sam Querrey in the final, 7–6^{(9–7)}, 6–7^{(4–7)}, [11–9].

== Seeds ==
1. (Poland) Łukasz Kubot / (Brazil) Marcelo Melo (quarterfinals)
2. (United States) Bob Bryan / (United States) Mike Bryan (quarterfinals)
3. (United Kingdom) Jamie Murray / (Brazil) Bruno Soares (quarterfinals)
4. (Netherlands) Jean-Julien Rojer / (Romania) Horia Tecău (first round)

== Draw ==
=== Key ===
- Q = Qualifier
- WC = Wild card
- LL = Lucky loser
- Alt = Alternate
- SE = Special exempt
- PR = Protected ranking
- ITF = ITF entry
- JE = Junior exempt
- w/o = Walkover
- r = Retired
- d = Defaulted
- SR = Special ranking

=== Draw ===
First round
1	(Poland) Ł Kubot (Brazil) M Melo	7^{7}	6
(United States) J Isner (Canada) D Nestor	6^{3}	4
(India) R Bopanna (Uruguay) P Cuevas	6	6
WC	(Germany) P Kohlschreiber (Belarus) M Mirnyi	2	1
3	(United Kingdom) J Murray (Brazil) B Soares	6	7^{7}
(Argentina) A Molteni (Argentina) D Schwartzman	2	6^{5}
Q	(Spain) P Carreño Busta (Spain) D Marrero	4	2
(Russia) K Khachanov (France) L Pouille	6	6
(Mexico) S González (Chile) J Peralta	6	7^{7}
(Netherlands) M Middelkoop (Spain) A Ramos Viñolas	3	6^{4}
(Austria) O Marach (Croatia) M Pavić	5	7	[11]
4	(Netherlands) J-J Rojer (Romania) H Tecău	7	5	[9]
(Spain) F López (Spain) M López	6	6^{5}	[7]
(Brazil) M Demoliner (United States) S Querrey	4	7^{7}	[10]
WC	(Austria) P Oswald (Austria) A Peya	4	6	[6]
2	(United States) B Bryan (United States) M Bryan	6	2	[10]

Quarterfinals
1	(Poland) Ł Kubot (Brazil) M Melo	7^{7}	4	[8]
(India) R Bopanna (Uruguay) P Cuevas	6^{3}	6	[10]
3	(United Kingdom) J Murray (Brazil) B Soares	6	6^{3}	[7]
(Russia) K Khachanov (France) L Pouille	2	7^{7}	[10]
(Mexico) S González (Chile) J Peralta	4	6	[3]
(Austria) O Marach (Croatia) M Pavić	6	3	[10]
(Brazil) M Demoliner (United States) S Querrey	6	3	[10]
2	(United States) B Bryan (United States) M Bryan	3	6	[8]

Semifinals
(India) R Bopanna (Uruguay) P Cuevas	7^{7}	6
(Russia) K Khachanov (France) L Pouille	6^{2}	4
(Austria) O Marach (Croatia) M Pavić
(Brazil) M Demoliner (United States) S Querrey	w/o

Final
(India) R Bopanna (Uruguay) P Cuevas	7^{9}	6^{4}	[11]
(Brazil) M Demoliner (United States) S Querrey	6^{7}	7^{7}	[9]

== Qualifying ==
=== Seeds ===
1. (Sweden) Robert Lindstedt / (Australia) John-Patrick Smith (qualifying competition)
2. (Spain) Pablo Carreño Busta / (Spain) David Marrero (qualified)

=== Qualifiers ===
1. (Spain) Pablo Carreño Busta / (Spain) David Marrero

=== Qualifying draw ===
First round
1	(Sweden) Robert Lindstedt (Australia) John-Patrick Smith	6	6
WC	(Russia) Bogdan Bobrov (Germany) Richard Waite	1	4
(Austria) Maximilian Neuchrist (Austria) Tristan-Samuel Weissborn	5	2
2	(Spain) Pablo Carreño Busta (Spain) David Marrero	7	6

Qualifying competition
1	(Sweden) Robert Lindstedt (Australia) John-Patrick Smith	3	5
2	(Spain) Pablo Carreño Busta (Spain) David Marrero	6	7
