= 2017 Grand Prix Hassan II =

- Date: 10 – 16 April
- Edition: 33rd
- Category: ATP World Tour 250
- Draw: 28S / 16D
- Prize money: €482,060
- Surface: Clay
- Location: Marrakesh, Morocco

Champions

Singles
- (Croatia) Borna Ćorić

Doubles
- (United Kingdom) Dominic Inglot / (Croatia) Mate Pavić
- Grand Prix Hassan II

The 2017 Grand Prix Hassan II was a professional men's tennis tournament played on clay courts. It was the 33rd edition of the tournament and part of the ATP World Tour 250 series of the 2017 ATP World Tour. It took place in Marrakesh, Morocco between 10 April and 16 April 2017. Unseeded Borna Ćorić won the singles title.

== Finals ==
=== Singles ===
- (Croatia) Borna Ćorić defeated (Germany) Philipp Kohlschreiber, 5–7, 7–6^{(7–3)}, 7–5.

=== Doubles ===
- (United Kingdom) Dominic Inglot / (Croatia) Mate Pavić defeated (Spain) Marcel Granollers / (Spain) Marc López, 6–4, 2–6, [11–9]

== Point distribution ==
Event	W	F	SF	QF	Round of 16	Round of 32	Q	Q2
Singles	250	150	90	45	20	0	12	6
Doubles	250	150	90	45	0	—N/a	—N/a	—N/a

== Singles main-draw entrants ==
=== Seeds ===
Country	Player	Rank^{1}	Seed
BUL	Grigor Dimitrov	12	1
ESP	Albert Ramos Viñolas	24	2
GER	Philipp Kohlschreiber	32	3
GER	Mischa Zverev	33	4
ITA	Paolo Lorenzi	38	5
FRA	Benoît Paire	40	6
ARG	Diego Schwartzman	41	7
ESP	Marcel Granollers	45	8

- ^{1} Rankings are as of April 3, 2017.

=== Other entrants ===
The following players received wildcards into the singles main draw:

- (Morocco) Amine Ahouda
- (Bulgaria) Grigor Dimitrov
- (Morocco) Reda El Amrani

The following players received entry from the qualifying draw:

- (Japan) Taro Daniel
- (Serbia) Laslo Đere
- (Italy) Gianluigi Quinzi
- (Ukraine) Sergiy Stakhovsky

The following players received entry as a lucky loser:

- (Italy) Luca Vanni

=== Withdrawals ===
Before the tournament

- (Georgia (country)) Nikoloz Basilashvili →replaced by (Italy) Luca Vanni
- (Bosnia and Herzegovina) Damir Džumhur →replaced by (France) Paul-Henri Mathieu
- (Russia) Karen Khachanov →replaced by (Moldova) Radu Albot
- (Russia) Andrey Kuznetsov →replaced by (Spain) Guillermo García López
- (Russia) Daniil Medvedev →replaced by (France) Jérémy Chardy

=== Retirements ===
- (Argentina) Federico Delbonis

== Doubles main-draw entrants ==
=== Seeds ===
Country	Player	Country	Player	Rank^{1}	Seed
RSA	Raven Klaasen	USA	Rajeev Ram	23	1
ESP	Marcel Granollers	ESP	Marc López	33	2
IND	Rohan Bopanna	POL	Marcin Matkowski	51	3
ROU	Florin Mergea	PAK	Aisam-ul-Haq Qureshi	53	4

- Rankings are as of April 3, 2017.

=== Other entrants ===
The following pairs received wildcards into the doubles main draw:

- (Morocco) Amine Ahouda / (Morocco) Reda El Amrani
- (Morocco) Yassine Idmbarek / (Morocco) Mehdi Jdi

=== Withdrawals ===
During the tournament

- (Argentina) Carlos Berlocq
