= 2017 Grand Prix Hassan II – Doubles =

Doubles
- 2017 Grand Prix Hassan II

Final
- Champions: (United Kingdom) Dominic Inglot (Croatia) Mate Pavić
- Runners-up: (Spain) Marcel Granollers (Spain) Marc López
- Score: 6–4, 2–6, [11–9]

Events
Singles	Doubles
- Grand Prix Hassan II

Guillermo Durán and Máximo González were the defending champions, but González chose to compete in Houston instead. Durán played alongside Andrés Molteni, but lost in the quarterfinals to Raven Klaasen and Rajeev Ram.

Dominic Inglot and Mate Pavić won the title, defeating Marcel Granollers and Marc López in the final, 6–4, 2–6, [11–9].

== Seeds ==
1. (South Africa) Raven Klaasen / (United States) Rajeev Ram (semifinals)
2. (Spain) Marcel Granollers / (Spain) Marc López (final)
3. (India) Rohan Bopanna / (Poland) Marcin Matkowski (quarterfinals)
4. (Romania) Florin Mergea / (Pakistan) Aisam-ul-Haq Qureshi (semifinals)

== Draw ==
Key

- Q = Qualifier
- WC = Wild card
- LL = Lucky loser
- Alt = Alternate
- ITF = ITF entry
- PR = Protected ranking
- SR = Special ranking
- SE = Special exempt
- JE = Junior exempt
- JR = Junior Accelerator Programme entrant
- CO = College Accelerator Programme entrant
- NG = Next Gen Accelerator Program entrant
- w/o = Walkover
- r = Retired
- d = Defaulted

=== Draw ===
First round
1	(South Africa) R Klaasen (United States) R Ram	7^{7}	7
PR	(Spain) D Marrero (Spain) T Robredo	6^{4}	5
(Argentina) G Durán (Argentina) A Molteni	6	6
WC	(Morocco) Y Idmbarek (Morocco) M Jdi	4	0
3	(India) R Bopanna (Poland) M Matkowski	6	6
(New Zealand) M Daniell (Brazil) M Demoliner	4	3
(United Kingdom) D Inglot (Croatia) M Pavić	6	6
(Philippines) T Huey (Belarus) M Mirnyi	4	4
(Spain) N Almagro (Argentina) C Berlocq	3	6	[10]
(Italy) P Lorenzi (Germany) M Zverev	6	4	[6]
WC	(Morocco) A Ahouda (Morocco) R El Amrani	3	2
4	(Romania) F Mergea (Pakistan) A-u-H Qureshi	6	6
(Netherlands) W Koolhof (Netherlands) M Middelkoop	2	7^{7}	[6]
(France) J Chardy (France) F Martin	6	6^{2}	[10]
(Spain) G García López (Argentina) D Schwartzman	6	3	[3]
2	(Spain) M Granollers (Spain) M López	3	6	[10]

Quarterfinals
1	(South Africa) R Klaasen (United States) R Ram	7	6
(Argentina) G Durán (Argentina) A Molteni	5	4
3	(India) R Bopanna (Poland) M Matkowski	2	4
(United Kingdom) D Inglot (Croatia) M Pavić	6	6
(Spain) N Almagro (Argentina) C Berlocq
4	(Romania) F Mergea (Pakistan) A-u-H Qureshi	w/o
(France) J Chardy (France) F Martin	7	5	[8]
2	(Spain) M Granollers (Spain) M López	5	7	[10]

Semifinals
1	(South Africa) R Klaasen (United States) R Ram	6	6^{2}	[8]
(United Kingdom) D Inglot (Croatia) M Pavić	3	7^{7}	[10]
4	(Romania) F Mergea (Pakistan) A-u-H Qureshi	6^{9}	7^{7}	[4]
2	(Spain) M Granollers (Spain) M López	7^{11}	6^{4}	[10]

Final
(United Kingdom) D Inglot (Croatia) M Pavić	6	2	[11]
2	(Spain) M Granollers (Spain) M López	4	6	[9]
