= 2017 Aegon Championships – Doubles =

Doubles
- 2017 Queen's Club Championships

Final
- Champions: (United Kingdom) Jamie Murray (Brazil) Bruno Soares
- Runners-up: (France) Julien Benneteau (France) Édouard Roger-Vasselin
- Score: 6–2, 6–3

Details
- Draw: 16

Events
Singles	Doubles
- Queen's Club Championships

Pierre-Hugues Herbert and Nicolas Mahut were the two-time defending champions, but retired in the first round against Marcus Daniell and Marcelo Demoliner.

Jamie Murray and Bruno Soares won the title, defeating Julien Benneteau and Édouard Roger-Vasselin in the final, 6–2, 6–3.

== Seeds ==
1. (Finland) Henri Kontinen / (Australia) John Peers (quarterfinals)
2. (France) Pierre-Hugues Herbert / (France) Nicolas Mahut (first round, retired)
3. (United Kingdom) Jamie Murray / (Brazil) Bruno Soares (champions)
4. (United States) Bob Bryan / (United States) Mike Bryan (quarterfinals)

== Draw ==
Key

- Q = Qualifier
- WC = Wild card
- LL = Lucky loser
- Alt = Alternate
- ITF = ITF entry
- PR = Protected ranking
- SR = Special ranking
- SE = Special exempt
- JE = Junior exempt
- JR = Junior Accelerator Programme entrant
- CO = College Accelerator Programme entrant
- NG = Next Gen Accelerator Program entrant
- w/o = Walkover
- r = Retired
- d = Defaulted

=== Draw ===
First round
1	(Finland) H Kontinen (Australia) J Peers	7^{12}	7^{8}
(United States) J Isner (United States) S Johnson	6^{10}	6^{6}
WC	(United Kingdom) K Edmund (Australia) T Kokkinakis	3	7^{7}	[7]
(India) R Bopanna (Croatia) I Dodig	6	6^{5}	[10]
4	(United States) B Bryan (United States) M Bryan	7^{7}	7^{7}
(Bulgaria) G Dimitrov (France) J-W Tsonga	6^{5}	6^{5}
(France) J Benneteau (France) É Roger-Vasselin	6	7^{7}
(Canada) D Nestor (Canada) M Raonic	2	6^{3}
(Spain) F López (Spain) M López	2	4
(United States) R Harrison (New Zealand) M Venus	6	6
(Luxembourg) G Müller (United States) S Querrey	6^{4}	1
3	(United Kingdom) J Murray (Brazil) B Soares	7^{7}	6
LL	(United States) N Monroe (United States) D Young	5	6	[10]
(Croatia) M Čilić (Poland) M Matkowski	7	4	[12]
Q	(New Zealand) M Daniell (Brazil) M Demoliner	4	5
2	(France) P-H Herbert (France) N Mahut	6	3^{r}

Quarterfinals
1	(Finland) H Kontinen (Australia) J Peers	6^{2}	6	[2]
(India) R Bopanna (Croatia) I Dodig	7^{7}	4	[10]
4	(United States) B Bryan (United States) M Bryan	6^{4}	6	[6]
(France) J Benneteau (France) É Roger-Vasselin	7^{7}	4	[10]
(United States) R Harrison (New Zealand) M Venus	6^{1}	6	[6]
3	(United Kingdom) J Murray (Brazil) B Soares	7^{7}	4	[10]
(Croatia) M Čilić (Poland) M Matkowski	7^{11}	1	[10]
Q	(New Zealand) M Daniell (Brazil) M Demoliner	6^{9}	6	[8]

Semifinals
(India) R Bopanna (Croatia) I Dodig	4	5
(France) J Benneteau (France) É Roger-Vasselin	6	7
3	(United Kingdom) J Murray (Brazil) B Soares	1	6	[10]
(Croatia) M Čilić (Poland) M Matkowski	6	3	[8]

Final
(France) J Benneteau (France) É Roger-Vasselin	2	3
3	(United Kingdom) J Murray (Brazil) B Soares	6	6

== Qualifying ==
=== Seeds ===
1. (United States) Nicholas Monroe / (United States) Donald Young (qualifying competition, Lucky losers)
2. (Sweden) Robert Lindstedt / (Brazil) André Sá (first round)

=== Qualifiers ===
1. (New Zealand) Marcus Daniell / (Brazil) Marcelo Demoliner

=== Lucky losers ===
1. (United States) Nicholas Monroe / (United States) Donald Young

=== Qualifying draw ===
First round
1	(United States) Nicholas Monroe (United States) Donald Young	7^{7}	6
WC	(Austria) Julian Knowle (Serbia) Nenad Zimonjić	6^{4}	1
(New Zealand) Marcus Daniell (Brazil) Marcelo Demoliner	6	3	[10]
2	(Sweden) Robert Lindstedt (Brazil) André Sá	3	6	[8]

Qualifying competition
1	(United States) Nicholas Monroe (United States) Donald Young	6^{13}	4
(New Zealand) Marcus Daniell (Brazil) Marcelo Demoliner	7^{15}	6
