= 2017 Gerry Weber Open =

- Date: 19–25 June
- Edition: 25th
- Category: ATP World Tour 500
- Draw: 32S / 16D
- Prize money: €1,836,660
- Surface: Grass
- Location: Halle, Germany
- Venue: Gerry Weber Stadion

Champions

Singles
- (Switzerland) Roger Federer

Doubles
- (Poland) Łukasz Kubot / (Brazil) Marcelo Melo
← 2016 ·	Gerry Weber Open	· 2018 →

The 2017 Gerry Weber Open was a men's tennis tournament played on outdoor grass courts. It was the 25th edition of the tournament and part of the ATP World Tour 500 series of the 2017 ATP World Tour. It took place at the Gerry Weber Stadion in Halle, Germany, between 19 June and 25 June 2017. First-seeded Roger Federer won his ninth singles title at the event.

== Points and prize money ==
=== Point distribution ===
Event	W	F	SF	QF	Round of 16	Round of 32	Q	Q2	Q1
Singles	500	300	180	90	45	0	20	10	0
Doubles	500	300	180	90	0	—	—	—	—

=== Prize money ===
Event	W	F	SF	QF	Round of 16	Round of 32	Q	Q2	Q1
Singles	€395,690	€193,985	€97,610	€49,640	€25,780	€13,595	€0	€3,010	€1,535
Doubles*	€119,140	€58,330	€29,260	€15,020	€7,760	—	—	—	—

_{*per team}

== Singles main-draw entrants ==
=== Seeds ===
Country	Player	Rank^{1}	Seed
SUI	Roger Federer	5	1
AUT	Dominic Thiem	8	2
JPN	Kei Nishikori	9	3
GER	Alexander Zverev	10	4
FRA	Gaël Monfils	15	5
FRA	Lucas Pouille	16	6
ESP	Roberto Bautista Agut	19	7
ESP	Albert Ramos Viñolas	22	8

- ^{1} Rankings are as of June 12, 2017

=== Other entrants ===
The following players received wildcards into the singles main draw:

- (Germany) Dustin Brown
- (Germany) Tommy Haas
- (Russia) Andrey Rublev

The following players received entry from the qualifying draw:

- (Slovakia) Lukáš Lacko
- (Germany) Maximilian Marterer
- (Canada) Vasek Pospisil
- (Russia) Mikhail Youzhny

The following player received entry as a lucky loser:

- (Japan) Yūichi Sugita

=== Withdrawals ===
Before the tournament

- (Spain) Pablo Carreño Busta →replaced by (France) Benoît Paire
- (Chinese Taipei) Lu Yen-hsun →replaced by (Japan) Yūichi Sugita

=== Retirements ===
- (Japan) Kei Nishikori

== Doubles main-draw entrants ==
=== Seeds ===
Country	Player	Country	Player	Rank^{1}	Seed
POL	Łukasz Kubot	BRA	Marcelo Melo	14	1
RSA	Raven Klaasen	USA	Rajeev Ram	25	2
NED	Jean-Julien Rojer	ROU	Horia Tecău	43	3
ROU	Florin Mergea	PAK	Aisam-ul-Haq Qureshi	64	4

- Rankings are as of June 12, 2017.

=== Other entrants ===
The following pairs received wildcards into the doubles main draw:

- (Germany) Dustin Brown / (Germany) Jan-Lennard Struff
- (Germany) Florian Mayer / (Germany) Philipp Petzschner

The following pair received entry from the qualifying draw:

- (Germany) Andre Begemann / (Germany) Tim Pütz

=== Retirements ===
- (United States) Brian Baker

== Finals ==
=== Singles ===
- (Switzerland) Roger Federer defeated (Germany) Alexander Zverev, 6–1, 6–3

=== Doubles ===
- (Poland) Łukasz Kubot / (Brazil) Marcelo Melo defeated (Germany) Alexander Zverev / (Germany) Mischa Zverev, 5–7, 6–3, [10–8]
