= 2017 Gerry Weber Open – Singles =

Singles
- 2017 Gerry Weber Open

Final
- Champion: (Switzerland) Roger Federer
- Runner-up: (Germany) Alexander Zverev
- Score: 6–1, 6–3

Details
- Draw: 32 (4 Q / 3 WC )
- Seeds: 8

Events
Singles	Doubles
- Gerry Weber Open

Roger Federer defeated Alexander Zverev in the final, 6–1, 6–3 to win the singles tennis title at the 2017 Halle Open. It was his record-extending ninth title in Halle. He did not lose a single set in the entire tournament.

Florian Mayer was the defending champion, but lost to Federer in the quarterfinals.

== Seeds ==
1. (Switzerland) Roger Federer (champion)
2. (Austria) Dominic Thiem (second round)
3. (Japan) Kei Nishikori (second round, retired)
4. (Germany) Alexander Zverev (final)
5. (France) Gaël Monfils (first round)
6. (France) Lucas Pouille (second round)
7. (Spain) Roberto Bautista Agut (quarterfinals)
8. (Spain) Albert Ramos Viñolas (first round)

== Draw ==
Key

- Q = Qualifier
- WC = Wild card
- LL = Lucky loser
- Alt = Alternate
- ITF = ITF entry
- PR = Protected ranking
- SR = Special ranking
- SE = Special exempt
- JE = Junior exempt
- JR = Junior Accelerator Programme entrant
- CO = College Accelerator Programme entrant
- NG = Next Gen Accelerator Program entrant
- w/o = Walkover
- r = Retired
- d = Defaulted

=== Finals ===
Semifinals
1	(Switzerland) Roger Federer	6	7^{7}
(Russia) Karen Khachanov	4	6^{5}
4	(Germany) Alexander Zverev	4	6	6
(France) Richard Gasquet	6	4	3

Final
1	(Switzerland) Roger Federer	6	6
4	(Germany) Alexander Zverev	1	3

=== Top half ===
First round
1	(Switzerland) R Federer	6	6
LL	(Japan) Y Sugita	3	1
Q	(Slovakia) L Lacko	4	4
(Germany) M Zverev	6	6
(France) B Paire	0	4
(Germany) F Mayer	6	6
(Germany) J-L Struff	6	3	4
6	(France) L Pouille	1	6	6
3	(Japan) K Nishikori	6^{7}	6	6
(Spain) F Verdasco	7^{9}	3	4
(Russia) K Khachanov	6	6^{2}	6
(France) G Simon	2	7^{7}	3
(Croatia) I Karlović	3	6^{6}
Q	(Russia) M Youzhny	6	7^{8}
WC	(Russia) A Rublev	6^{1}	7	6
8	(Spain) A Ramos Viñolas	7^{7}	5	4

Second round
1	(Switzerland) R Federer	7^{7}	6
(Germany) M Zverev	6^{4}	4
(Germany) F Mayer	6^{6}	6	6
6	(France) L Pouille	7^{8}	4	3
3	(Japan) K Nishikori	2^{r}
(Russia) K Khachanov	3
Q	(Russia) M Youzhny	0	6	3
WC	(Russia) A Rublev	6	3	6

Quarterfinals
1	(Switzerland) R Federer	6	6
(Germany) F Mayer	3	4
(Russia) K Khachanov	7^{10}	4	6
WC	(Russia) A Rublev	6^{8}	6	3

Semifinals
1	(Switzerland) R Federer	6	7^{7}
(Russia) K Khachanov	4	6^{5}

=== Bottom half ===
First round
7	(Spain) R Bautista Agut	6	4	6
(Argentina) C Berlocq	0	6	2
WC	(Germany) D Brown	6	6^{3}	7^{7}
Q	(Canada) V Pospisil	1	7^{7}	6^{4}
(Portugal) J Sousa	6	4	4
(Germany) P Kohlschreiber	3	6	6
(Italy) P Lorenzi	3	2
4	(Germany) A Zverev	6	6
5	(France) G Monfils	6	4	3
(France) R Gasquet	3	6	6
WC	(Germany) T Haas	4	4
(Australia) B Tomic	6	6
(Netherlands) R Haase	3	7	6
(Spain) D Ferrer	6	5	3
Q	(Germany) M Marterer	5	3
2	(Austria) D Thiem	7	6

Second round
7	(Spain) R Bautista Agut	6	1	7^{8}
WC	(Germany) D Brown	4	6	6^{6}
(Germany) P Kohlschreiber	3	4
4	(Germany) A Zverev	6	6
(France) R Gasquet	6	6
(Australia) B Tomic	3	3
(Netherlands) R Haase	6	7^{9}
2	(Austria) D Thiem	3	6^{7}

Quarterfinals
7	(Spain) R Bautista Agut	7^{8}	6^{1}	1
4	(Germany) A Zverev	6^{6}	7^{7}	6
(France) R Gasquet	6	3	6
(Netherlands) R Haase	1	6	1

Semifinals
4	(Germany) A Zverev	4	6	6
(France) R Gasquet	6	4	3

== Qualifying ==
=== Seeds ===
1. (Japan) Yūichi Sugita (qualifying competition, lucky loser)
2. (Uzbekistan) Denis Istomin (first round)
3. (Italy) Andreas Seppi (qualifying competition)
4. (United States) Ernesto Escobedo (qualifying competition, retired)
5. (Russia) Andrey Kuznetsov (first round)
6. (Canada) Vasek Pospisil (qualified)
7. (Russia) Mikhail Youzhny (qualified)
8. (Slovakia) Lukáš Lacko (qualified)

=== Qualifiers ===
1. (Russia) Mikhail Youzhny
2. (Germany) Maximilian Marterer
3. (Slovakia) Lukáš Lacko
4. (Canada) Vasek Pospisil

=== Lucky loser ===
1. (Japan) Yūichi Sugita

=== Qualifying draw ===
==== First qualifier ====
First round
1	(Japan) Yūichi Sugita	7	6
WC	(Germany) Yannick Hanfmann	5	1
(Germany) Benjamin Becker	3	4
7	(Russia) Mikhail Youzhny	6	6

Qualifying competition
1	(Japan) Yūichi Sugita	6^{5}	7^{13}	6^{12}
7	(Russia) Mikhail Youzhny	7^{7}	6^{11}	7^{14}

==== Second qualifier ====
First round
2	(Uzbekistan) Denis Istomin	6^{5}	6^{3}
(Germany) Maximilian Marterer	7^{7}	7^{7}
(Kazakhstan) Alexander Bublik	2	6	6
5	(Russia) Andrey Kuznetsov	6	4	4

Qualifying competition
(Germany) Maximilian Marterer	6	6
(Kazakhstan) Alexander Bublik	0	3

==== Third qualifier ====
First round
3	(Italy) Andreas Seppi	6	6
WC	(Germany) Daniel Masur	3	3
(Belgium) Ruben Bemelmans	4	3
8	(Slovakia) Lukáš Lacko	6	6

Qualifying competition
3	(Italy) Andreas Seppi	4	5
8	(Slovakia) Lukáš Lacko	6	7

==== Fourth qualifier ====
First round
4	(United States) Ernesto Escobedo	6	7^{7}
(Italy) Luca Vanni	3	6^{2}
WC	(Germany) Daniel Altmaier	2	1
6	(Canada) Vasek Pospisil	6	6

Qualifying competition
4	(United States) Ernesto Escobedo	2^{r}
6	(Canada) Vasek Pospisil	4
