= 2017 Aegon Championships – Singles =

Singles
- 2017 Queen's Club Championships

Final
- Champion: (Spain) Feliciano López
- Runner-up: (Croatia) Marin Čilić
- Score: 4–6, 7–6^{(7–2)}, 7–6^{(10–8)}

Details
- Draw: 32 (4 Q / 3 WC )
- Seeds: 8

Events
Singles	Doubles
- Queen's Club Championships

Andy Murray was the two-time defending champion but lost to Jordan Thompson in the first round.

Feliciano López won the title, defeating Marin Čilić in the final, 4–6, 7–6^{(7–2)}, 7–6^{(10–8)}.

Ranked 698th in the world, Thanasi Kokkinakis became the lowest-ranked player to win a match against a player inside the top 10 since Juan Ignacio Chela, then ranked 890th in the world, against Sébastien Grosjean in Amsterdam in 2001.

== Seeds ==
1. (United Kingdom) Andy Murray (first round)
2. (Switzerland) Stan Wawrinka (first round)
3. (Canada) Milos Raonic (first round)
4. (Croatia) Marin Čilić (final)
5. (France) Jo-Wilfried Tsonga (second round)
6. (Bulgaria) Grigor Dimitrov (semifinals)
7. (Czech Republic) Tomáš Berdych (quarterfinals)
8. (United States) Jack Sock (withdrew due to knee injury)
9. (Australia) Nick Kyrgios (first round, retired)

== Draw ==
Key

- Q = Qualifier
- WC = Wild card
- LL = Lucky loser
- Alt = Alternate
- ITF = ITF entry
- PR = Protected ranking
- SR = Special ranking
- SE = Special exempt
- JE = Junior exempt
- JR = Junior Accelerator Programme entrant
- CO = College Accelerator Programme entrant
- NG = Next Gen Accelerator Program entrant
- w/o = Walkover
- r = Retired
- d = Defaulted

=== Finals ===
Semifinals
(Luxembourg) Gilles Müller	3	7	4
4	(Croatia) Marin Čilić	6	5	6
6	(Bulgaria) Grigor Dimitrov	5	6	2
(Spain) Feliciano López	7	3	6

Final
4	(Croatia) Marin Čilić	6	6^{2}	6^{8}
(Spain) Feliciano López	4	7^{7}	7^{10}

=== Top half ===
First round
1	(United Kingdom) A Murray	6^{4}	2
LL	(Australia) J Thompson	7^{7}	6
WC	(United Kingdom) C Norrie	1	4
(United States) S Querrey	6	6
(Georgia (country)) N Basilashvili	4	7^{19}	4
(Luxembourg) G Müller	6	6^{17}	6
(France) A Mannarino	2	2
5	(France) J-W Tsonga	6	6
4	(Croatia) M Čilić	7	6
(United States) J Isner	5	3
(United States) S Johnson	6	1	1
Q	(United States) S Kozlov	3	6	6
(Serbia) V Troicki	5	7^{7}	7^{8}
(Serbia) J Tipsarević	7	6^{5}	6^{6}
(United States) D Young	7^{7}	0
9	(Australia) N Kyrgios	6^{3}	0^{r}

Second round
LL	(Australia) J Thompson	6^{3}	6	3
(United States) S Querrey	7^{7}	3	6
(Luxembourg) G Müller	6	6
5	(France) J-W Tsonga	4	4
4	(Croatia) M Čilić	6	6
Q	(United States) S Kozlov	0	4
(Serbia) V Troicki	3	4
(United States) D Young	6	6

Quarterfinals
(United States) S Querrey	4	6^{5}
(Luxembourg) G Müller	6	7^{7}
4	(Croatia) M Čilić	6	7
(United States) D Young	4	5

Semifinals
(Luxembourg) G Müller	3	7	4
4	(Croatia) M Čilić	6	5	6

=== Bottom half ===
First round
6	(Bulgaria) G Dimitrov	6	6
(United States) R Harrison	3	1
Q	(France) J Benneteau	6	6
WC	(United Kingdom) J Ward	2	2
(Russia) D Medvedev	6^{3}	6	6
(France) N Mahut	7^{7}	4	4
WC	(Australia) T Kokkinakis	7^{7}	7^{10}
3	(Canada) M Raonic	6^{5}	6^{8}
7	(Czech Republic) T Berdych	7	6
(Belgium) S Darcis	5	3
(United Kingdom) K Edmund	6^{4}	6	4
Q	(Canada) D Shapovalov	7^{7}	4	6
LL	(United Kingdom) L Broady	4	4
Q	(France) J Chardy	6	6
(Spain) F López	7^{7}	7
2	(Switzerland) S Wawrinka	6^{4}	5

Second round
6	(Bulgaria) G Dimitrov	4	6	6
Q	(France) J Benneteau	6	3	4
(Russia) D Medvedev	6	6
WC	(Australia) T Kokkinakis	2	2
7	(Czech Republic) T Berdych	7^{7}	6^{4}	7
Q	(Canada) D Shapovalov	6^{4}	7^{7}	5
Q	(France) J Chardy	1	6^{4}
(Spain) F López	6	7^{7}

Quarterfinals
6	(Bulgaria) G Dimitrov	6	3	6
(Russia) D Medvedev	3	6	3
7	(Czech Republic) T Berdych	6^{5}	7^{7}	5
(Spain) F López	7^{7}	6^{1}	7

Semifinals
6	(Bulgaria) G Dimitrov	5	6	2
(Spain) F López	7	3	6

== Qualifying ==
=== Seeds ===
1. (United States) Frances Tiafoe (first round)
2. (United States) Jared Donaldson (first round)
3. (France) Pierre-Hugues Herbert (qualifying competition, ~~Lucky loser~~)
4. (France) Jérémy Chardy (qualified)
5. (Australia) Jordan Thompson (qualifying competition, lucky loser)
6. (France) Julien Benneteau (qualified)
7. (United States) Reilly Opelka (first round)
8. (France) Kenny de Schepper (first round)

=== Qualifiers ===
1. (Canada) Denis Shapovalov
2. (France) Julien Benneteau
3. (United States) Stefan Kozlov
4. (France) Jérémy Chardy

=== Lucky losers ===
1. (France) ~~Pierre-Hugues Herbert~~
2. (Australia) Jordan Thompson
3. (United Kingdom) Liam Broady

=== Qualifying draw ===
==== First qualifier ====
First round
1	(United States) Frances Tiafoe	1	7^{7}	2
WC	(United Kingdom) Liam Broady	6	6^{2}	6
WC	(Canada) Denis Shapovalov	6	3	7^{8}
7	(United States) Reilly Opelka	3	6	6^{6}

Qualifying competition
WC	(United Kingdom) Liam Broady	4	4
WC	(Canada) Denis Shapovalov	6	6

==== Second qualifier ====
First round
2	(United States) Jared Donaldson	1	6^{4}
(Germany) Tobias Kamke	6	7^{7}
(Japan) Akira Santillan	3	1
6	(France) Julien Benneteau	6	6

Qualifying competition
(Germany) Tobias Kamke	5	4
6	(France) Julien Benneteau	7	6

==== Third qualifier ====
First round
3	(France) Pierre-Hugues Herbert	6	6
(Italy) Stefano Napolitano	1	4
(United States) Stefan Kozlov	6^{4}	6	6
8	(France) Kenny de Schepper	7^{7}	3	4

Qualifying competition
3	(France) Pierre-Hugues Herbert	4	2
(United States) Stefan Kozlov	6	6

==== Fourth qualifier ====
First round
4	(France) Jérémy Chardy	6	5	6
WC	(United Kingdom) Edward Corrie	4	7	3
(United States) Denis Kudla	7	6^{7}	2
5	(Australia) Jordan Thompson	5	7^{9}	6

Qualifying competition
4	(France) Jérémy Chardy	4	6	6
5	(Australia) Jordan Thompson	6	4	3
