= 2017 ABN AMRO World Tennis Tournament =

- Date: 13–19 February
- Edition: 44th
- Category: ATP World Tour 500
- Draw: 32S / 16D
- Prize money: €1,724,930
- Surface: Hard
- Location: Rotterdam, Netherlands
- Venue: Rotterdam Ahoy

Champions

Singles
- (France) Jo-Wilfried Tsonga

Doubles
- (Croatia) Ivan Dodig / (Spain) Marcel Granollers

Wheelchair singles
- (United Kingdom) Gordon Reid

Wheelchair doubles
- (France) Stéphane Houdet / (France) Nicolas Peifer
- ABN AMRO World Tennis Tournament

The 2017 ABN AMRO World Tennis Tournament (or Rotterdam Open) was a men's tennis tournament played on indoor hard courts. It took place at the Rotterdam Ahoy arena in the Dutch city of Rotterdam, between 13 and 19 February 2017. It was the 44th edition of the tournament, and part of the ATP World Tour 500 series of the 2017 ATP World Tour. Sixth-seeded Jo-Wilfried Tsonga won the singles title.

== Finals ==
=== Singles ===
- (France) Jo-Wilfried Tsonga defeated (Belgium) David Goffin, 4–6, 6–4, 6–1
- It was Tsonga's 1st singles title of the year and the 13th of his career.

=== Doubles ===
- (Croatia) Ivan Dodig / (Spain) Marcel Granollers defeated (Netherlands) Wesley Koolhof / (Netherlands) Matwé Middelkoop, 7–6^{(7–5)}, 6–3

== Points and prize money ==
=== Point distribution ===
Event	W	F	SF	QF	Round of 16	Round of 32	Q	Q2	Q1
Singles	500	300	180	90	45	0	20	10	0
Doubles	500	300	180	90	0	—N/a	45	25	0

=== Prize money ===
Event	W	F	SF	QF	Round of 16	Round of 32^{1}	Q2	Q1
Singles	€371,620	€182,185	€91,680	€46,620	€24,210	€12,770	€2,825	€1,440
Doubles *	€111,890	€54,780	€27,480	€14,100	€7,290	—N/a	—N/a	—N/a

_{^{1} Qualifiers prize money is also the Round of 32 prize money}
_{* per team}

== Singles main-draw entrants ==
=== Seeds ===
Country	Player	Ranking^{1}	Seed
CRO	Marin Čilić	7	1
AUT	Dominic Thiem	8	2
BEL	David Goffin	11	3
CZE	Tomáš Berdych	12	4
BUL	Grigor Dimitrov	13	5
FRA	Jo-Wilfried Tsonga	14	6
~~ESP~~	~~Roberto Bautista Agut~~	~~16~~	~~7~~
FRA	Lucas Pouille	17	8

- ^{1} Rankings as of February 6, 2017.

=== Other entrants ===
The following players received wildcards into the main draw:

- (Netherlands) Tallon Griekspoor
- (Netherlands) Robin Haase
- (Greece) Stefanos Tsitsipas

The following players received entry from the qualifying draw:

- (United Kingdom) Aljaž Bedene
- (Romania) Marius Copil
- (Russia) Evgeny Donskoy
- (France) Pierre-Hugues Herbert

The following player received entry as a lucky loser:

- (Uzbekistan) Denis Istomin

=== Withdrawals ===
Before the tournament

- (Cyprus) Marcos Baghdatis →replaced by (Croatia) Borna Ćorić
- (Spain) Roberto Bautista Agut →replaced by (Uzbekistan) Denis Istomin
- (Spain) Rafael Nadal →replaced by (Germany) Florian Mayer
- (Switzerland) Stan Wawrinka (knee injury) →replaced by (France) Benoît Paire

== Doubles main-draw entrants ==
=== Seeds ===
Country	Player	Country	Player	Rank^{1}	Seed
FRA	Pierre-Hugues Herbert	FRA	Nicolas Mahut	3	1
ESP	Feliciano López	ESP	Marc López	23	2
CRO	Ivan Dodig	ESP	Marcel Granollers	30	3
POL	Łukasz Kubot	BRA	Marcelo Melo	30	4

- ^{1} Rankings are as of February 6, 2017.

=== Other entrants ===
The following pairs received wildcards into the main draw:

- (Netherlands) Robin Haase / (Netherlands) Glenn Smits
- (Netherlands) Wesley Koolhof / (Netherlands) Matwé Middelkoop

The following pair received entry from the qualifying draw:

- (Netherlands) Tallon Griekspoor / (Netherlands) Niels Lootsma
