= 2017 Aegon Championships =

- Date: 19–25 June
- Edition: 115th
- Category: ATP World Tour 500 series
- Draw: 32S / 16D
- Prize money: €1,836,660
- Surface: Grass
- Location: London, United Kingdom
- Venue: Queen's Club

Champions

Singles
- (Spain) Feliciano López

Doubles
- (United Kingdom) Jamie Murray / (Brazil) Bruno Soares
- Queen's Club Championships

The 2017 Aegon Championships, also known traditionally as the Queen's Club Championships, was a men's tennis tournament played on outdoor grass courts. It was the 115th edition of those championships and part of the ATP World Tour 500 series of the 2017 ATP World Tour. It took place at the Queen's Club in London, United Kingdom from 19 June until 25 June 2017. Unseeded Feliciano López won the singles title.

== Finals ==
=== Singles ===
- (Spain) Feliciano López defeated (Croatia) Marin Čilić, 4–6, 7–6^{(7–2)}, 7–6^{(10–8)}

=== Doubles ===
- (United Kingdom) Jamie Murray / (Brazil) Bruno Soares defeated (France) Julien Benneteau / (France) Édouard Roger-Vasselin, 6–2, 6–3

== Points and prize money ==
=== Point distribution ===
Event	W	F	SF	QF	Round of 16	Round of 32	Q	Q2	Q1
Singles	500	300	180	90	45	0	20	10	0
Doubles	500	300	180	90	0	—N/a	—N/a	—N/a	—N/a

=== Prize money ===
Event	W	F	SF	QF	Round of 16	Round of 32	Q	Q2	Q1
Singles	€395,690	€193,985	€97,610	€49,640	€25,780	€13,595	€0	€3,010	€1,535
Doubles*	€119,140	€58,330	€29,260	€15,020	€7,760	—N/a	—N/a	—N/a	—N/a

_{*per team}

== Singles main-draw entrants ==
=== Seeds ===
Country	Player	Rank^{1}	Seed
GBR	Andy Murray	1	1
SUI	Stan Wawrinka	3	2
CAN	Milos Raonic	6	3
CRO	Marin Čilić	7	4
FRA	Jo-Wilfried Tsonga	11	5
BUL	Grigor Dimitrov	12	6
CZE	Tomáš Berdych	14	7
USA	~~Jack Sock~~	~~18~~	~~8~~
AUS	Nick Kyrgios	20	9

- Rankings are as of June 12, 2017.

=== Other entrants ===
The following players received wildcards into the singles main draw:

- (Australia) Thanasi Kokkinakis
- (United Kingdom) Cameron Norrie
- (United Kingdom) James Ward

The following players received entry from the qualifying draw:

- (France) Julien Benneteau
- (France) Jérémy Chardy
- (United States) Stefan Kozlov
- (Canada) Denis Shapovalov

The following players received entry as lucky losers:

- (United Kingdom) Liam Broady
- (France) ~~Pierre-Hugues Herbert~~
- (Australia) Jordan Thompson

=== Withdrawals ===
Before the tournament

- (Argentina) Juan Martín del Potro →replaced by (Georgia (country)) Nikoloz Basilashvili
- (Belgium) David Goffin →replaced by (France) Adrian Mannarino
- (Spain) Rafael Nadal →replaced by (Australia) Jordan Thompson
- (Argentina) Diego Schwartzman →replaced by (United Kingdom) Kyle Edmund
- (United States) Jack Sock →replaced by (United Kingdom) Liam Broady

=== Retirements ===
- (Australia) Nick Kyrgios

== Doubles main-draw entrants ==
=== Seeds ===
Country	Player	Country	Player	Rank^{1}	Seed
FIN	Henri Kontinen	AUS	John Peers	3	1
FRA	Pierre-Hugues Herbert	FRA	Nicolas Mahut	8	2
GBR	Jamie Murray	BRA	Bruno Soares	13	3
USA	Bob Bryan	USA	Mike Bryan	16	4

- Rankings are as of June 12, 2017.

=== Other entrants ===
The following pairs received wildcards into the doubles main draw:

- (United Kingdom) Kyle Edmund / (Australia) Thanasi Kokkinakis
- (United Kingdom) Dominic Inglot / (Australia) Nick Kyrgios

The following pair received entry from the qualifying draw:

- (New Zealand) Marcus Daniell / (Brazil) Marcelo Demoliner

The following pair received entry as lucky losers:

- (United States) Nicholas Monroe / (United States) Donald Young

=== Withdrawals ===
Before the tournament

- (Australia) Nick Kyrgios

=== Retirements ===
- (France) Pierre-Hugues Herbert
