= 2017 Erste Bank Open – Singles =

Singles
- 2017 Erste Bank Open

Final
- Champion: (France) Lucas Pouille
- Runner-up: (France) Jo-Wilfried Tsonga
- Score: 6–1, 6–4

Details
- Draw: 32 (4 Q / 3 WC )
- Seeds: 8

Events
| Singles | Doubles |
- Vienna Open

Andy Murray was the defending champion, but could not participate this year due to injury.

Lucas Pouille won the title, defeating Jo-Wilfried Tsonga in the final, 6–1, 6–4.

== Seeds ==
1. (Germany) Alexander Zverev (quarterfinals)
2. (Austria) Dominic Thiem (second round)
3. (Bulgaria) Grigor Dimitrov (withdrew)
4. (Spain) Pablo Carreño Busta (second round)
5. (United States) John Isner (first round)
6. (United States) Sam Querrey (first round)
7. (South Africa) Kevin Anderson (first round)
8. (France) Jo-Wilfried Tsonga (final)

== Draw ==
Key

- Q = Qualifier
- WC = Wild card
- LL = Lucky loser
- Alt = Alternate
- ITF = ITF entry
- PR = Protected ranking
- SR = Special ranking
- SE = Special exempt
- JE = Junior exempt
- JR = Junior Accelerator Programme entrant
- CO = College Accelerator Programme entrant
- NG = Next Gen Accelerator Program entrant
- w/o = Walkover
- r = Retired
- d = Defaulted

=== Finals ===
Semifinals
8 | (France) Jo-Wilfried Tsonga | 7^{7} | 7
(Germany) Philipp Kohlschreiber | 6^{4} | 5
(United Kingdom) Kyle Edmund | 7^{9} | 4 | 3
(France) Lucas Pouille | 6^{7} | 6 | 6

Final
8 | (France) Jo-Wilfried Tsonga | 1 | 4
(France) Lucas Pouille | 6 | 6

=== Top half ===
First round
1 | (Germany) A Zverev | 6 | 4 | 6
(Serbia) V Troicki | 3 | 6 | 4
(France) G Simon | 6 | 6
WC | (Latvia) E Gulbis | 3 | 3
(Bosnia and Herzegovina) D Džumhur | 6 | 6
SE | (Lithuania) R Berankis | 4 | 2
(Russia) K Khachanov | 7^{7} | 4 | 3
8 | (France) J-W Tsonga | 6^{2} | 6 | 6
4 | (Spain) P Carreño Busta | 6 | 7^{9}
Q | (Argentina) G Pella | 2 | 6^{7}
(Argentina) D Schwartzman | 6 | 2 | 6
(Italy) F Fognini | 1 | 6 | 2
(Australia) B Tomic | 6^{4} | 5
Q | (France) P-H Herbert | 7^{7} | 7
(Germany) P Kohlschreiber | 7^{8} | 6
5 | (United States) J Isner | 6^{6} | 4

Second round
1 | (Germany) A Zverev | 7^{8} | 6
(France) G Simon | 6^{6} | 4
(Bosnia and Herzegovina) D Džumhur | 7^{7} | 6^{7} | 1
8 | (France) J-W Tsonga | 6^{5} | 7^{9} | 6
4 | (Spain) P Carreño Busta | 7 | 1 | 1
(Argentina) D Schwartzman | 5 | 6 | 6
Q | (France) P-H Herbert | 6^{4} | 3
(Germany) P Kohlschreiber | 7^{7} | 6

Quarterfinals
1 | (Germany) A Zverev | 6^{6} | 2
8 | (France) J-W Tsonga | 7^{8} | 6
(Argentina) D Schwartzman | 5 | 6^{6}
(Germany) P Kohlschreiber | 7 | 7^{8}

Semifinals
8 | (France) J-W Tsonga | 7^{7} | 7
(Germany) P Kohlschreiber | 6^{4} | 5

=== Bottom half ===
First round
6 | (United States) S Querrey | 6 | 6^{7} | 6^{3}
(Spain) A Ramos Viñolas | 3 | 7^{9} | 7^{7}
(Uruguay) P Cuevas | 5 | 1
(Germany) J-L Struff | 7 | 6
(Spain) D Ferrer | 2 | 6^{5}
(United Kingdom) K Edmund | 6 | 7^{7}
Q | (Austria) D Novak | 7^{7} | 7
LL | (Italy) T Fabbiano | 6^{4} | 5
7 | (South Africa) K Anderson | 4 | 4
Q | (Spain) G García López | 6 | 6
(France) L Pouille | 6 | 6
WC | (Austria) S Ofner | 3 | 4
(France) R Gasquet | 6 | 6
(Spain) F López | 2 | 3
(Russia) A Rublev | 4 | 3
2 | (Austria) D Thiem | 6 | 6

Second round
(Spain) A Ramos Viñolas | 7^{7} | 2 | 6^{1}
(Germany) J-L Struff | 6^{5} | 6 | 7^{7}
(United Kingdom) K Edmund | 7^{7} | 6^{5} | 7^{7}
Q | (Austria) D Novak | 6^{2} | 7^{7} | 6^{3}
Q | (Spain) G García López | 3 | 6^{8}
(France) L Pouille | 6 | 7^{10}
(France) R Gasquet | 4 | 7 | 6
2 | (Austria) D Thiem | 6 | 5 | 1

Quarterfinals
(Germany) J-L Struff | 2 | 5
(United Kingdom) K Edmund | 6 | 7
(France) L Pouille | 7^{7} | 6
(France) R Gasquet | 6^{5} | 1

Semifinals
(United Kingdom) K Edmund | 7^{9} | 4 | 3
(France) L Pouille | 6^{7} | 6 | 6

== Qualifying ==
=== Seeds ===
1. (Georgia (country)) Nikoloz Basilashvili (first round)
2. (Argentina) Guido Pella (qualified)
3. (Serbia) Dušan Lajović (first round)
4. (Italy) Thomas Fabbiano (qualifying competition, lucky loser)
5. (Brazil) Rogério Dutra Silva (first round)
6. (Spain) Guillermo García López (qualified)
7. (France) Pierre-Hugues Herbert (qualified)
8. (Italy) Andreas Seppi (first round)

=== Qualifiers ===
1. (Spain) Guillermo García López
2. (Argentina) Guido Pella
3. (France) Pierre-Hugues Herbert
4. (Austria) Dennis Novak

=== Lucky loser ===
1. (Italy) Thomas Fabbiano

=== Qualifying draw ===
==== First qualifier ====
First round
1 | (Georgia (country)) Nikoloz Basilashvili | 1 | 5
(Ukraine) Sergiy Stakhovsky | 6 | 7
(Poland) Jerzy Janowicz | 6^{7} | 4
6 | (Spain) Guillermo García López | 7^{9} | 6

Qualifying competition
(Ukraine) Sergiy Stakhovsky | 6 | 3 | 1
6 | (Spain) Guillermo García López | 3 | 6 | 6

==== Second qualifier ====
First round
2 | (Argentina) Guido Pella | 6 | 5 | 6
WC | (Sweden) Elias Ymer | 3 | 7 | 3
(Slovakia) Lukáš Lacko | 7 | 6
5 | (Brazil) Rogério Dutra Silva | 5 | 4

Qualifying competition
2 | (Argentina) Guido Pella | 6 | 6
(Slovakia) Lukáš Lacko | 2 | 2

==== Third qualifier ====
First round
3 | (Serbia) Dušan Lajović | 3 | 4
PR | (Italy) Simone Bolelli | 6 | 6
(France) Quentin Halys | 2 | 7 | 3
7 | (France) Pierre-Hugues Herbert | 6 | 5 | 6

Qualifying competition
PR | (Italy) Simone Bolelli | 6^{1} | 2
7 | (France) Pierre-Hugues Herbert | 7^{7} | 6

==== Fourth qualifier ====
First round
4 | (Italy) Thomas Fabbiano | 6 | 6
WC | (Austria) Andreas Haider-Maurer | 3 | 2
WC | (Austria) Dennis Novak | 6 | 7^{7}
8 | (Italy) Andreas Seppi | 4 | 6^{1}

Qualifying competition
4 | (Italy) Thomas Fabbiano | 4 | 6 | 3
WC | (Austria) Dennis Novak | 6 | 3 | 6
