= Niels Lootsma =

Dutch tennis player

- Country (sports): Netherlands
- Residence: Amsterdam, Netherlands
- Born: 15 August 1994 (age 31) Groningen, Netherlands
- Height: 1.93 m (6 ft 4 in)
- Plays: Right-handed (two-handed backhand)
- Prize money: $85,903

Singles
- Career record: 0–0 (at ATP Tour level, Grand Slam level, and in Davis Cup)
- Career titles: 2 ITF
- Highest ranking: No. 423 (24 July 2017)
- Current ranking: No. 1,593 (24 November 2025)

Doubles
- Career record: 0–1 (at ATP Tour level, Grand Slam level, and in Davis Cup)
- Career titles: 12 ITF
- Highest ranking: No. 252 (23 November 2015)
- Current ranking: No. 1,100 (24 November 2025)
- Last updated on: 28 November 2025.

Niels Lootsma (born 15 August 1994) is a Dutch tennis player.

Lootsma has a career high ATP singles ranking of No. 423 achieved on 24 July 2017 and a career high ATP doubles ranking of No. 252 achieved on 23 November 2015.

Lootsma made his ATP main draw debut at the 2017 ABN AMRO World Tennis Tournament in the doubles draw partnering Tallon Griekspoor.
