= 2017 ATP World Tour =

Men's tennis circuit

- Rafael Nadal finished the year as world No. 1 for the fourth time in his career. He won six tournaments during the season, including two majors at the French Open and the US Open. He also won two Masters 1000 events and finished runner-up at another major, the Australian Open.

Details
- Duration: 1 January 2017 – 26 November 2017
- Edition: 48th
- Tournaments: 68
- Categories: Grand Slam (4); ATP Finals; ATP World Tour Masters 1000 (9); ATP World Tour 500 (13); ATP World Tour 250 (40)

Achievements (singles)
- Most titles: (Switzerland) Roger Federer (7)
- Most finals: (Spain) Rafael Nadal (10)
- Prize money leader: (Spain) Rafael Nadal ($15,864,000)
- Points leader: (Spain) Rafael Nadal (10,645)

Awards
- Player of the year: (Spain) Rafael Nadal
- Doubles team of the year: (Poland) Łukasz Kubot (Brazil) Marcelo Melo
- Most improved player of the year: (Canada) Denis Shapovalov
- Star of tomorrow: (Canada) Denis Shapovalov
- Comeback player of the year: (Switzerland) Roger Federer

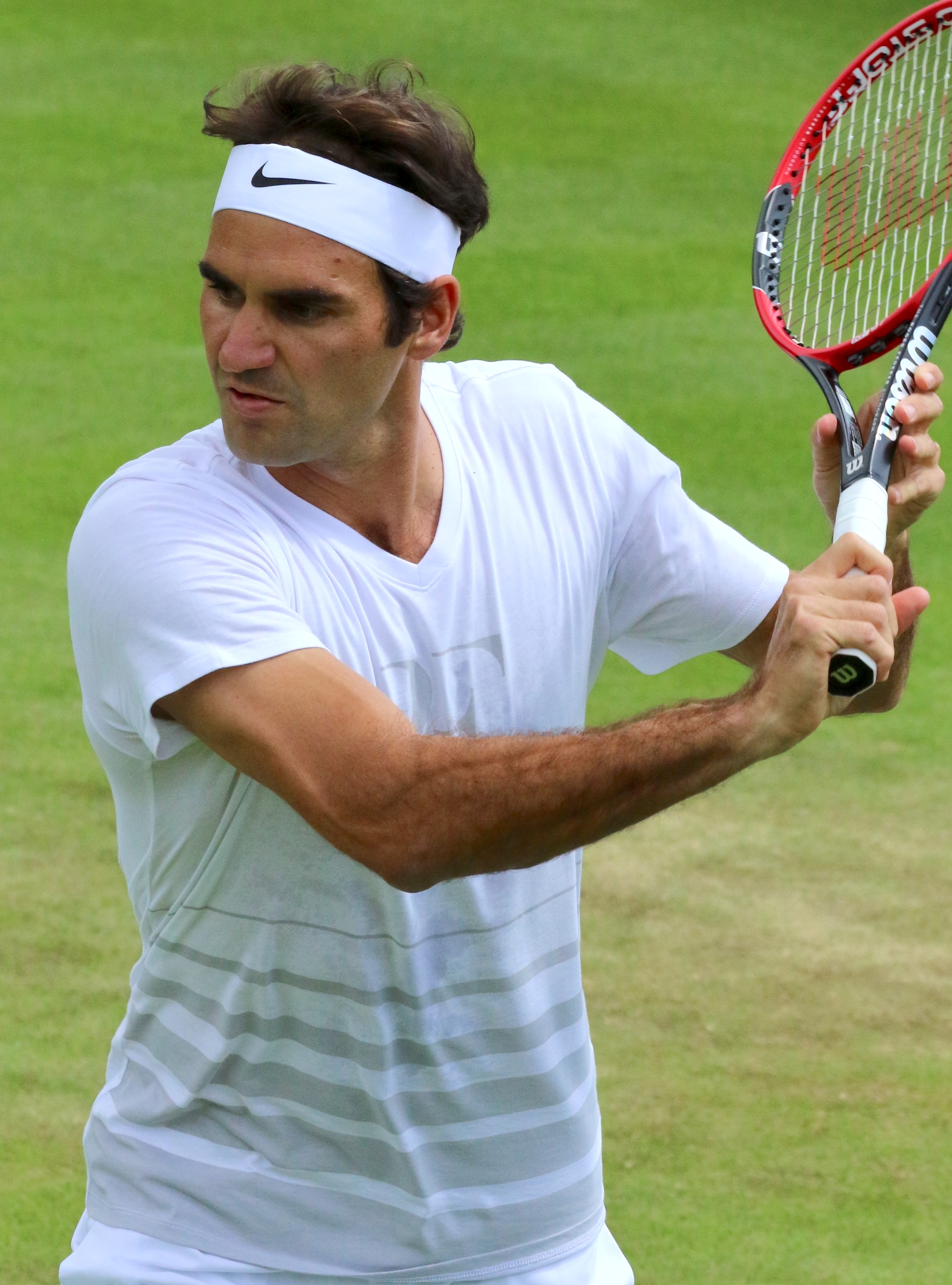
Roger Federer won his fifth Australian Open title (defeating Rafael Nadal in the final) and record-breaking eighth Wimbledon title (defeating Marin Čilić in the final), not dropping a set en route to the latter title. They were his first major championships in over four years, and extended his all-time record of men's singles major titles to 19.

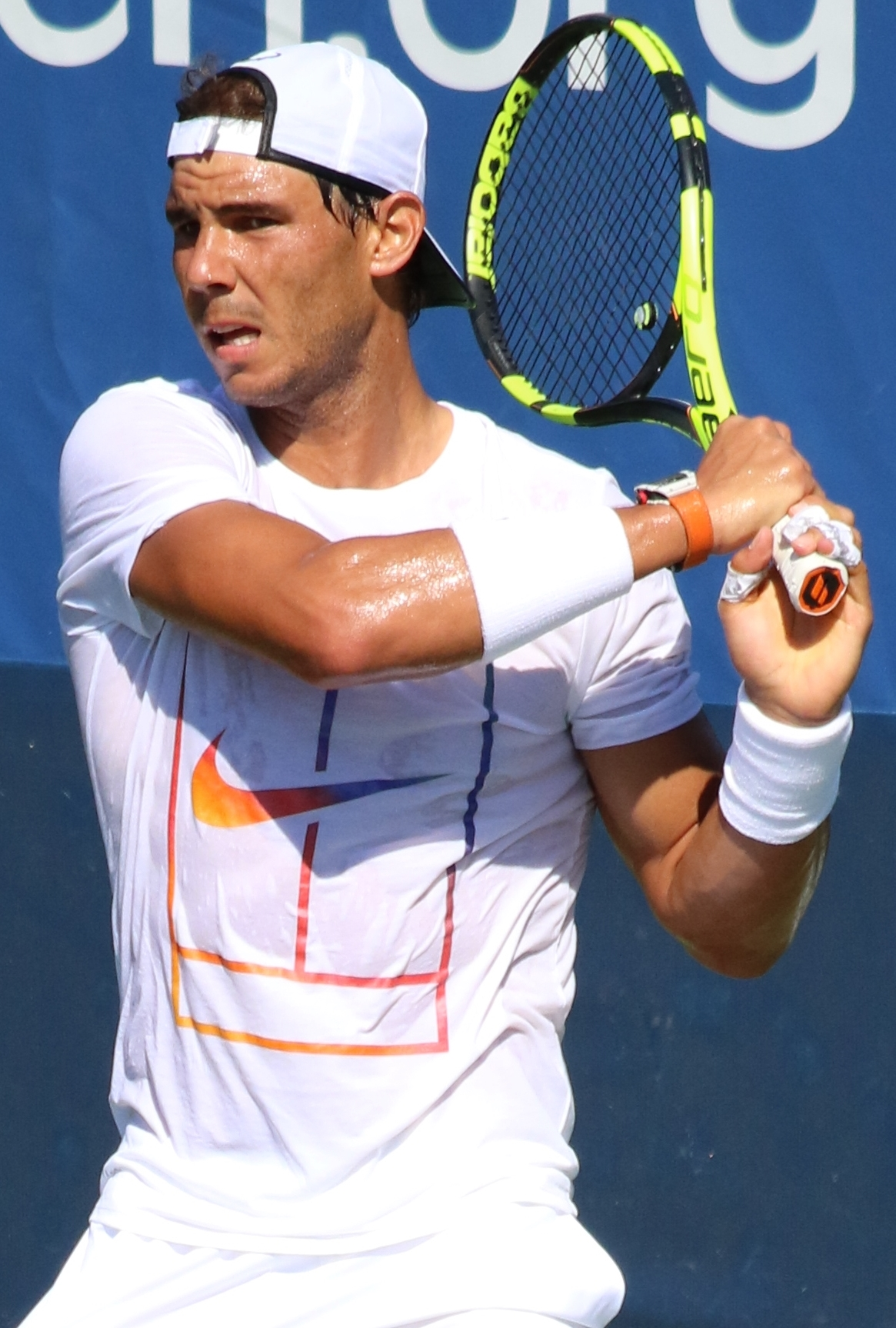
Rafael Nadal won his record-extending tenth French Open title (defeating Stan Wawrinka in the final) and third US Open title (defeating Kevin Anderson in the final), not dropping a set en route to the former title. They were his first major championships in three years, and increased his tally of major titles to 16.

The 2017 ATP World Tour was the global elite men's professional tennis circuit organized by the Association of Tennis Professionals (ATP) for the 2017 tennis season. The 2017 ATP World Tour calendar comprised the Grand Slam tournaments (supervised by the International Tennis Federation (ITF)), the ATP World Tour Masters 1000, the ATP Finals, the ATP World Tour 500 series, the ATP World Tour 250 series and the Davis Cup (organized by the ITF). Also included in the 2017 calendar are the Hopman Cup and the Next Gen ATP Finals, which do not distribute ranking points.

== Schedule ==
This is the complete schedule of events on the 2017 calendar.

Key
Grand Slam
ATP Finals
ATP World Tour Masters 1000
ATP World Tour 500
ATP World Tour 250
Team Events

=== January ===
Week	Tournament	Champions	Runners-up	Semifinalists	Quarterfinalists
2 Jan	Hopman Cup; Perth, Australia; ITF Mixed Teams Championships; Hard (i) – 8 teams (RR)	France; 2–1	United States	Round robin (Group A) Switzerland; Germany; Great Britain	Round robin (Group B) Spain; Czech Republic; Australia
2 Jan	Qatar Open; Doha, Qatar; ATP World Tour 250; Hard – $1,334,270 – 32S/16Q/16D; Singles – Doubles	(Serbia) Novak Djokovic; 6–3, 5–7, 6–4	(United Kingdom) Andy Murray	(Czech Republic) Tomáš Berdych (Spain) Fernando Verdasco	(Spain) Nicolás Almagro (France) Jo-Wilfried Tsonga (Croatia) Ivo Karlović (Czech Republic) Radek Štěpánek
2 Jan	Qatar Open; Doha, Qatar; ATP World Tour 250; Hard – $1,334,270 – 32S/16Q/16D; Singles – Doubles	(France) Jérémy Chardy (France) Fabrice Martin; 6–4, 7–6^{(7–3)}	(Canada) Vasek Pospisil (Czech Republic) Radek Štěpánek	(Czech Republic) Tomáš Berdych (Spain) Fernando Verdasco	(Spain) Nicolás Almagro (France) Jo-Wilfried Tsonga (Croatia) Ivo Karlović (Czech Republic) Radek Štěpánek
2 Jan	Chennai Open; Chennai, India; ATP World Tour 250; Hard – $505,730 – 28S/16Q/16D; Singles – Doubles	(Spain) Roberto Bautista Agut; 6–3, 6–4	(Russia) Daniil Medvedev	(Israel) Dudi Sela (France) Benoît Paire	(Slovakia) Jozef Kovalík (Spain) Albert Ramos Viñolas (United Kingdom) Aljaž Bedene (Russia) Mikhail Youzhny
2 Jan	Chennai Open; Chennai, India; ATP World Tour 250; Hard – $505,730 – 28S/16Q/16D; Singles – Doubles	(India) Rohan Bopanna (India) Jeevan Nedunchezhiyan; 6–3, 6–4	(India) Purav Raja (India) Divij Sharan	(Israel) Dudi Sela (France) Benoît Paire	(Slovakia) Jozef Kovalík (Spain) Albert Ramos Viñolas (United Kingdom) Aljaž Bedene (Russia) Mikhail Youzhny
2 Jan	Brisbane International; Brisbane, Australia; ATP World Tour 250; Hard – $495,630 – 28S/16Q/16D; Singles – Doubles	(Bulgaria) Grigor Dimitrov; 6–2, 2–6, 6–3	(Japan) Kei Nishikori	(Canada) Milos Raonic (Switzerland) Stan Wawrinka	(Spain) Rafael Nadal (Austria) Dominic Thiem (Australia) Jordan Thompson (United Kingdom) Kyle Edmund
2 Jan	Brisbane International; Brisbane, Australia; ATP World Tour 250; Hard – $495,630 – 28S/16Q/16D; Singles – Doubles	(Australia) Thanasi Kokkinakis (Australia) Jordan Thompson; 7–6^{(9–7)}, 6–4	(Luxembourg) Gilles Müller (United States) Sam Querrey	(Canada) Milos Raonic (Switzerland) Stan Wawrinka	(Spain) Rafael Nadal (Austria) Dominic Thiem (Australia) Jordan Thompson (United Kingdom) Kyle Edmund
9 Jan	Auckland Open; Auckland, New Zealand; ATP World Tour 250; Hard – $508,360 – 28S/16Q/16D; Singles – Doubles	(United States) Jack Sock; 6–3, 5–7, 6–3	(Portugal) João Sousa	(Cyprus) Marcos Baghdatis (United States) Steve Johnson	(Czech Republic) Jiří Veselý (Netherlands) Robin Haase (France) Jérémy Chardy (United States) John Isner
9 Jan	Auckland Open; Auckland, New Zealand; ATP World Tour 250; Hard – $508,360 – 28S/16Q/16D; Singles – Doubles	(Poland) Marcin Matkowski (Pakistan) Aisam-ul-Haq Qureshi; 1–6, 6–2, [10–3]	(Israel) Jonathan Erlich (United States) Scott Lipsky	(Cyprus) Marcos Baghdatis (United States) Steve Johnson	(Czech Republic) Jiří Veselý (Netherlands) Robin Haase (France) Jérémy Chardy (United States) John Isner
9 Jan	Sydney International; Sydney, Australia; ATP World Tour 250; Hard – $495,630 – 28S/16Q/16D; Singles – Doubles	(Luxembourg) Gilles Müller; 7–6^{(7–5)}, 6–2	(United Kingdom) Daniel Evans	(Russia) Andrey Kuznetsov (Serbia) Viktor Troicki	(Austria) Dominic Thiem (Spain) Pablo Carreño Busta (Germany) Philipp Kohlschreiber (Uruguay) Pablo Cuevas
9 Jan	Sydney International; Sydney, Australia; ATP World Tour 250; Hard – $495,630 – 28S/16Q/16D; Singles – Doubles	(Netherlands) Wesley Koolhof (Netherlands) Matwé Middelkoop; 6–3, 7–5	(United Kingdom) Jamie Murray (Brazil) Bruno Soares	(Russia) Andrey Kuznetsov (Serbia) Viktor Troicki	(Austria) Dominic Thiem (Spain) Pablo Carreño Busta (Germany) Philipp Kohlschreiber (Uruguay) Pablo Cuevas
16 Jan; 23 Jan	Australian Open; Melbourne, Australia; Grand Slam; Hard – A$22,737,600; 128S/128Q/64D/32X; Singles – Doubles – Mixed doubles	(Switzerland) Roger Federer; 6–4, 3–6, 6–1, 3–6, 6–3	(Spain) Rafael Nadal	(Switzerland) Stan Wawrinka (Bulgaria) Grigor Dimitrov	(Germany) Mischa Zverev (France) Jo-Wilfried Tsonga (Canada) Milos Raonic (Belgium) David Goffin
16 Jan; 23 Jan	Australian Open; Melbourne, Australia; Grand Slam; Hard – A$22,737,600; 128S/128Q/64D/32X; Singles – Doubles – Mixed doubles	(Finland) Henri Kontinen (Australia) John Peers; 7–5, 7–5	(United States) Bob Bryan (United States) Mike Bryan	(Switzerland) Stan Wawrinka (Bulgaria) Grigor Dimitrov	(Germany) Mischa Zverev (France) Jo-Wilfried Tsonga (Canada) Milos Raonic (Belgium) David Goffin
16 Jan; 23 Jan	Australian Open; Melbourne, Australia; Grand Slam; Hard – A$22,737,600; 128S/128Q/64D/32X; Singles – Doubles – Mixed doubles	(United States) Abigail Spears (Colombia) Juan Sebastián Cabal; 6–2, 6–4	(India) Sania Mirza (Croatia) Ivan Dodig	(Switzerland) Stan Wawrinka (Bulgaria) Grigor Dimitrov	(Germany) Mischa Zverev (France) Jo-Wilfried Tsonga (Canada) Milos Raonic (Belgium) David Goffin
30 Jan	Davis Cup First Round; Buenos Aires, Argentina – clay Frankfurt, Germany – hard (i); Kooyong, Australia – hard Birmingham, United States – hard (i); Tokyo, Japan – hard (i); Ottawa, Canada – hard (i); Niš, Serbia – hard (i); Osijek, Croatia – hard (i)	First-round winners Italy 3–2; Belgium 4–1; Australia 4–1; United States 5–0; France 4–1; Great Britain 3–2; Serbia 4–1; Spain 3–2	First-round losers Argentina; Germany; Czech Republic; Switzerland; Japan; Canada; Russia; Croatia		

=== February ===
Week	Tournament	Champions	Runners-up	Semifinalists	Quarterfinalists
6 Feb	Open Sud de France; Montpellier, France; ATP World Tour 250; Hard (i) – €540,310 – 28S/16Q/16D; Singles – Doubles	(Germany) Alexander Zverev; 7–6^{(7–4)}, 6–3	(France) Richard Gasquet	(France) Benoît Paire (France) Jo-Wilfried Tsonga	(Germany) Dustin Brown (France) Kenny de Schepper (France) Jérémy Chardy (Russia) Daniil Medvedev
6 Feb	Open Sud de France; Montpellier, France; ATP World Tour 250; Hard (i) – €540,310 – 28S/16Q/16D; Singles – Doubles	(Germany) Alexander Zverev (Germany) Mischa Zverev; 6–4, 6–7^{(3–7)}, [10–7]	(France) Fabrice Martin (Canada) Daniel Nestor	(France) Benoît Paire (France) Jo-Wilfried Tsonga	(Germany) Dustin Brown (France) Kenny de Schepper (France) Jérémy Chardy (Russia) Daniil Medvedev
6 Feb	Sofia Open; Sofia, Bulgaria; ATP World Tour 250; Hard (i) – €540,310 – 28S/16Q/16D; Singles – Doubles	(Bulgaria) Grigor Dimitrov; 7–5, 6–4	(Belgium) David Goffin	(Georgia (country)) Nikoloz Basilashvili (Spain) Roberto Bautista Agut	(Slovakia) Martin Kližan (Serbia) Viktor Troicki (Luxembourg) Gilles Müller (Belgium) Steve Darcis
6 Feb	Sofia Open; Sofia, Bulgaria; ATP World Tour 250; Hard (i) – €540,310 – 28S/16Q/16D; Singles – Doubles	(Serbia) Viktor Troicki (Serbia) Nenad Zimonjić; 6–4, 6–4	(Russia) Mikhail Elgin (Russia) Andrey Kuznetsov	(Georgia (country)) Nikoloz Basilashvili (Spain) Roberto Bautista Agut	(Slovakia) Martin Kližan (Serbia) Viktor Troicki (Luxembourg) Gilles Müller (Belgium) Steve Darcis
6 Feb	Ecuador Open; Quito, Ecuador; ATP World Tour 250; Clay (red) – $540,310 – 28S/16Q/16D; Singles – Doubles	(Dominican Republic) Víctor Estrella Burgos; 6–7^{(2–7)}, 7–5, 7–6^{(8–6)}	(Italy) Paolo Lorenzi	(Brazil) Thomaz Bellucci (Spain) Albert Ramos Viñolas	(Italy) Federico Gaio (Argentina) Renzo Olivo (United States) Rajeev Ram (Spain) Roberto Carballés Baena
6 Feb	Ecuador Open; Quito, Ecuador; ATP World Tour 250; Clay (red) – $540,310 – 28S/16Q/16D; Singles – Doubles	(United States) James Cerretani (Austria) Philipp Oswald; 6–3, 2–1 ret.	(Chile) Julio Peralta (Argentina) Horacio Zeballos	(Brazil) Thomaz Bellucci (Spain) Albert Ramos Viñolas	(Italy) Federico Gaio (Argentina) Renzo Olivo (United States) Rajeev Ram (Spain) Roberto Carballés Baena
13 Feb	Rotterdam Open; Rotterdam, Netherlands; ATP World Tour 500; Hard (i) – €1,854,365 – 32S/16Q/16D/4Q; Singles – Doubles	(France) Jo-Wilfried Tsonga; 4–6, 6–4, 6–1	(Belgium) David Goffin	(Czech Republic) Tomáš Berdych (France) Pierre-Hugues Herbert	(Croatia) Marin Čilić (Slovakia) Martin Kližan (Bulgaria) Grigor Dimitrov (Austria) Dominic Thiem
13 Feb	Rotterdam Open; Rotterdam, Netherlands; ATP World Tour 500; Hard (i) – €1,854,365 – 32S/16Q/16D/4Q; Singles – Doubles	(Croatia) Ivan Dodig (Spain) Marcel Granollers; 7–6^{(7–5)}, 6–3	(Netherlands) Wesley Koolhof (Netherlands) Matwé Middelkoop	(Czech Republic) Tomáš Berdych (France) Pierre-Hugues Herbert	(Croatia) Marin Čilić (Slovakia) Martin Kližan (Bulgaria) Grigor Dimitrov (Austria) Dominic Thiem
13 Feb	Memphis Open; Memphis, United States; ATP World Tour 250; Hard (i) – $720,410 – 28S/16Q/16D; Singles – Doubles	(United States) Ryan Harrison; 6–1, 6–4	(Georgia (country)) Nikoloz Basilashvili	(Kazakhstan) Mikhail Kukushkin (United States) Donald Young	(Australia) Matthew Ebden (United States) Steve Johnson (Bosnia and Herzegovina) Damir Džumhur (United States) John Isner
13 Feb	Memphis Open; Memphis, United States; ATP World Tour 250; Hard (i) – $720,410 – 28S/16Q/16D; Singles – Doubles	(United States) Brian Baker (Croatia) Nikola Mektić; 6–3, 6–4	(United States) Ryan Harrison (United States) Steve Johnson	(Kazakhstan) Mikhail Kukushkin (United States) Donald Young	(Australia) Matthew Ebden (United States) Steve Johnson (Bosnia and Herzegovina) Damir Džumhur (United States) John Isner
13 Feb	Argentina Open; Buenos Aires, Argentina; ATP World Tour 250; Clay (red) – $624,340 – 28S/16Q/16D; Singles – Doubles	(Ukraine) Alexandr Dolgopolov; 7–6^{(7–4)}, 6–4	(Japan) Kei Nishikori	(Argentina) Carlos Berlocq (Spain) Pablo Carreño Busta	(Portugal) João Sousa (Brazil) Thiago Monteiro (Spain) Albert Ramos Viñolas (Austria) Gerald Melzer
13 Feb	Argentina Open; Buenos Aires, Argentina; ATP World Tour 250; Clay (red) – $624,340 – 28S/16Q/16D; Singles – Doubles	(Colombia) Juan Sebastián Cabal (Colombia) Robert Farah; 6–1, 6–4	(Mexico) Santiago González (Spain) David Marrero	(Argentina) Carlos Berlocq (Spain) Pablo Carreño Busta	(Portugal) João Sousa (Brazil) Thiago Monteiro (Spain) Albert Ramos Viñolas (Austria) Gerald Melzer
20 Feb	Rio Open; Rio de Janeiro, Brazil; ATP World Tour 500; Clay (red) – $1,603,940 – 32S/16Q/16D/4Q; Singles – Doubles	(Austria) Dominic Thiem; 7–5, 6–4	(Spain) Pablo Carreño Busta	(Norway) Casper Ruud (Spain) Albert Ramos Viñolas	(Brazil) Thiago Monteiro (Ukraine) Alexandr Dolgopolov (Argentina) Nicolás Kicker (Argentina) Diego Schwartzman
20 Feb	Rio Open; Rio de Janeiro, Brazil; ATP World Tour 500; Clay (red) – $1,603,940 – 32S/16Q/16D/4Q; Singles – Doubles	(Spain) Pablo Carreño Busta (Uruguay) Pablo Cuevas; 6–4, 5–7, [10–8]	(Colombia) Juan Sebastián Cabal (Colombia) Robert Farah	(Norway) Casper Ruud (Spain) Albert Ramos Viñolas	(Brazil) Thiago Monteiro (Ukraine) Alexandr Dolgopolov (Argentina) Nicolás Kicker (Argentina) Diego Schwartzman
20 Feb	Open 13; Marseille, France; ATP World Tour 250; Hard (i) – €691,850 – 28S/16Q/16D; Singles – Doubles	(France) Jo-Wilfried Tsonga; 6–4, 6–4	(France) Lucas Pouille	(France) Richard Gasquet (Australia) Nick Kyrgios	(France) Gaël Monfils (Russia) Daniil Medvedev (Slovakia) Norbert Gombos (France) Gilles Simon
20 Feb	Open 13; Marseille, France; ATP World Tour 250; Hard (i) – €691,850 – 28S/16Q/16D; Singles – Doubles	(France) Julien Benneteau (France) Nicolas Mahut; 6–4, 6–7^{(9–11)}, [10–5]	(Netherlands) Robin Haase (United Kingdom) Dominic Inglot	(France) Richard Gasquet (Australia) Nick Kyrgios	(France) Gaël Monfils (Russia) Daniil Medvedev (Slovakia) Norbert Gombos (France) Gilles Simon
20 Feb	Delray Beach Open; Delray Beach, United States; ATP World Tour 250; Hard – $599,345 – 32S/16Q/16D; Singles – Doubles	(United States) Jack Sock; Walkover	(Canada) Milos Raonic	(Argentina) Juan Martín del Potro (United States) Donald Young	(United Kingdom) Kyle Edmund (United States) Sam Querrey (United States) Steve Johnson (Belgium) Steve Darcis
20 Feb	Delray Beach Open; Delray Beach, United States; ATP World Tour 250; Hard – $599,345 – 32S/16Q/16D; Singles – Doubles	(South Africa) Raven Klaasen (United States) Rajeev Ram; 7–5, 7–5	(Philippines) Treat Huey (Belarus) Max Mirnyi	(Argentina) Juan Martín del Potro (United States) Donald Young	(United Kingdom) Kyle Edmund (United States) Sam Querrey (United States) Steve Johnson (Belgium) Steve Darcis
27 Feb	Dubai Tennis Championships; Dubai, United Arab Emirates; ATP World Tour 500; Hard – $2,858,530 – 32S/16Q/16D/4Q; Singles – Doubles	(United Kingdom) Andy Murray; 6–3, 6–2	(Spain) Fernando Verdasco	(France) Lucas Pouille (Netherlands) Robin Haase	(Germany) Philipp Kohlschreiber (Russia) Evgeny Donskoy (France) Gaël Monfils (Bosnia and Herzegovina) Damir Džumhur
27 Feb	Dubai Tennis Championships; Dubai, United Arab Emirates; ATP World Tour 500; Hard – $2,858,530 – 32S/16Q/16D/4Q; Singles – Doubles	(Netherlands) Jean-Julien Rojer (Romania) Horia Tecău; 4–6, 6–3, [10–3]	(India) Rohan Bopanna (Poland) Marcin Matkowski	(France) Lucas Pouille (Netherlands) Robin Haase	(Germany) Philipp Kohlschreiber (Russia) Evgeny Donskoy (France) Gaël Monfils (Bosnia and Herzegovina) Damir Džumhur
27 Feb	Mexican Open; Acapulco, Mexico; ATP World Tour 500; Hard – $1,633,690 – 32S/16Q/16D/4Q; Singles – Doubles	(United States) Sam Querrey; 6–3, 7–6^{(7–3)}	(Spain) Rafael Nadal	(Australia) Nick Kyrgios (Croatia) Marin Čilić	(Serbia) Novak Djokovic (Austria) Dominic Thiem (United States) Steve Johnson (Japan) Yoshihito Nishioka
27 Feb	Mexican Open; Acapulco, Mexico; ATP World Tour 500; Hard – $1,633,690 – 32S/16Q/16D/4Q; Singles – Doubles	(United Kingdom) Jamie Murray (Brazil) Bruno Soares; 6–3, 6–3	(United States) John Isner (Spain) Feliciano López	(Australia) Nick Kyrgios (Croatia) Marin Čilić	(Serbia) Novak Djokovic (Austria) Dominic Thiem (United States) Steve Johnson (Japan) Yoshihito Nishioka
27 Feb	Brasil Open; São Paulo, Brazil; ATP World Tour 250; Clay (red) – $520,285 – 28S/16Q/16D; Singles – Doubles	(Uruguay) Pablo Cuevas; 6–7^{(3–7)}, 6–4, 6–4	(Spain) Albert Ramos Viñolas	(Spain) Pablo Carreño Busta (Portugal) João Sousa	(Italy) Fabio Fognini (Argentina) Diego Schwartzman (Argentina) Federico Delbonis (Argentina) Guido Pella
27 Feb	Brasil Open; São Paulo, Brazil; ATP World Tour 250; Clay (red) – $520,285 – 28S/16Q/16D; Singles – Doubles	(Brazil) Rogério Dutra Silva (Brazil) André Sá; 7–6^{(7–5)}, 5–7, [10–7]	(New Zealand) Marcus Daniell (Brazil) Marcelo Demoliner	(Spain) Pablo Carreño Busta (Portugal) João Sousa	(Italy) Fabio Fognini (Argentina) Diego Schwartzman (Argentina) Federico Delbonis (Argentina) Guido Pella

=== March ===
Week	Tournament	Champions	Runners-up	Semifinalists	Quarterfinalists
6 Mar; 13 Mar	Indian Wells Masters; Indian Wells, United States; ATP World Tour Masters 1000; Hard – $6,993,450 – 96S/48Q/32D; Singles – Doubles	(Switzerland) Roger Federer; 6–4, 7–5	(Switzerland) Stan Wawrinka	(Spain) Pablo Carreño Busta (United States) Jack Sock	(Uruguay) Pablo Cuevas (Austria) Dominic Thiem (Japan) Kei Nishikori (Australia) Nick Kyrgios
6 Mar; 13 Mar	Indian Wells Masters; Indian Wells, United States; ATP World Tour Masters 1000; Hard – $6,993,450 – 96S/48Q/32D; Singles – Doubles	(South Africa) Raven Klaasen (United States) Rajeev Ram; 6–7^{(1–7)}, 6–4, [10–8]	(Poland) Łukasz Kubot (Brazil) Marcelo Melo	(Spain) Pablo Carreño Busta (United States) Jack Sock	(Uruguay) Pablo Cuevas (Austria) Dominic Thiem (Japan) Kei Nishikori (Australia) Nick Kyrgios
20 Mar; 27 Mar	Miami Open; Key Biscayne, United States; ATP World Tour Masters 1000; Hard – $6,993,450 – 96S/48Q/32D; Singles – Doubles	(Switzerland) Roger Federer; 6–3, 6–4	(Spain) Rafael Nadal	(Australia) Nick Kyrgios (Italy) Fabio Fognini	(Germany) Alexander Zverev (Czech Republic) Tomáš Berdych (United States) Jack Sock (Japan) Kei Nishikori
20 Mar; 27 Mar	Miami Open; Key Biscayne, United States; ATP World Tour Masters 1000; Hard – $6,993,450 – 96S/48Q/32D; Singles – Doubles	(Poland) Łukasz Kubot (Brazil) Marcelo Melo; 7–5, 6–3	(United States) Nicholas Monroe (United States) Jack Sock	(Australia) Nick Kyrgios (Italy) Fabio Fognini	(Germany) Alexander Zverev (Czech Republic) Tomáš Berdych (United States) Jack Sock (Japan) Kei Nishikori

=== April ===
Week	Tournament	Champions	Runners-up	Semifinalists	Quarterfinalists
3 Apr	Davis Cup Quarterfinals; Charleroi, Belgium – hard (i); Brisbane, Australia – hard Rouen, France – clay (i); Belgrade, Serbia – hard (i)	Quarterfinals winners Belgium 3–2; Australia 3–2; France 4–1; Serbia 4–1	Quarterfinals losers Italy; United States; Great Britain; Spain		
10 Apr	U.S. Men's Clay Court Championships; Houston, United States; ATP World Tour 250; Clay (maroon) – $600,345 – 28S/16Q/16D; Singles – Doubles	(United States) Steve Johnson; 6–4, 4–6, 7–6^{(7–5)}	(Brazil) Thomaz Bellucci	(United States) Jack Sock (United States) Ernesto Escobedo	(Spain) Feliciano López (Spain) Fernando Verdasco (United States) Sam Querrey (United States) John Isner
10 Apr	U.S. Men's Clay Court Championships; Houston, United States; ATP World Tour 250; Clay (maroon) – $600,345 – 28S/16Q/16D; Singles – Doubles	(Chile) Julio Peralta (Argentina) Horacio Zeballos; 4–6, 7–5, [10–6]	(Germany) Dustin Brown (United States) Frances Tiafoe	(United States) Jack Sock (United States) Ernesto Escobedo	(Spain) Feliciano López (Spain) Fernando Verdasco (United States) Sam Querrey (United States) John Isner
10 Apr	Grand Prix Hassan II; Marrakesh, Morocco; ATP World Tour 250; Clay (red) – €540,310 – 28S/16Q/16D; Singles – Doubles	(Croatia) Borna Ćorić; 5–7, 7–6^{(7–3)}, 7–5	(Germany) Philipp Kohlschreiber	(France) Benoît Paire (Czech Republic) Jiří Veselý	(Spain) Tommy Robredo (Germany) Jan-Lennard Struff (Italy) Paolo Lorenzi (Spain) Albert Ramos Viñolas
10 Apr	Grand Prix Hassan II; Marrakesh, Morocco; ATP World Tour 250; Clay (red) – €540,310 – 28S/16Q/16D; Singles – Doubles	(United Kingdom) Dominic Inglot (Croatia) Mate Pavić; 6–4, 2–6, [11–9]	(Spain) Marcel Granollers (Spain) Marc López	(France) Benoît Paire (Czech Republic) Jiří Veselý	(Spain) Tommy Robredo (Germany) Jan-Lennard Struff (Italy) Paolo Lorenzi (Spain) Albert Ramos Viñolas
17 Apr	Monte-Carlo Masters; Roquebrune-Cap-Martin, France; ATP World Tour Masters 1000; Clay (red) – €4,273,775 – 56S/28Q/24D; Singles – Doubles	(Spain) Rafael Nadal; 6–1, 6–3	(Spain) Albert Ramos Viñolas	(France) Lucas Pouille (Belgium) David Goffin	(Croatia) Marin Čilić (Uruguay) Pablo Cuevas (Argentina) Diego Schwartzman (Serbia) Novak Djokovic
17 Apr	Monte-Carlo Masters; Roquebrune-Cap-Martin, France; ATP World Tour Masters 1000; Clay (red) – €4,273,775 – 56S/28Q/24D; Singles – Doubles	(India) Rohan Bopanna (Uruguay) Pablo Cuevas; 6–3, 3–6, [10–4]	(Spain) Feliciano López (Spain) Marc López	(France) Lucas Pouille (Belgium) David Goffin	(Croatia) Marin Čilić (Uruguay) Pablo Cuevas (Argentina) Diego Schwartzman (Serbia) Novak Djokovic
24 Apr	Barcelona Open; Barcelona, Spain; ATP World Tour 500; Clay (red) – €2,604,340 – 48S/24Q/16D/4Q; Singles – Doubles	(Spain) Rafael Nadal; 6–4, 6–1	(Austria) Dominic Thiem	(United Kingdom) Andy Murray (Argentina) Horacio Zeballos	(Spain) Albert Ramos Viñolas (Japan) Yūichi Sugita (South Korea) Chung Hyeon (Russia) Karen Khachanov
24 Apr	Barcelona Open; Barcelona, Spain; ATP World Tour 500; Clay (red) – €2,604,340 – 48S/24Q/16D/4Q; Singles – Doubles	(Romania) Florin Mergea (Pakistan) Aisam-ul-Haq Qureshi; 6–4, 6–3	(Germany) Philipp Petzschner (Austria) Alexander Peya	(United Kingdom) Andy Murray (Argentina) Horacio Zeballos	(Spain) Albert Ramos Viñolas (Japan) Yūichi Sugita (South Korea) Chung Hyeon (Russia) Karen Khachanov
24 Apr	Hungarian Open; Budapest, Hungary; ATP World Tour 250; Clay (red) – €540,310 – 28S/16Q/16D; Singles – Doubles	(France) Lucas Pouille; 6–3, 6–1	(United Kingdom) Aljaž Bedene	(Italy) Paolo Lorenzi (Serbia) Laslo Đere	(Slovakia) Martin Kližan (Russia) Andrey Kuznetsov (Spain) Fernando Verdasco (Croatia) Ivo Karlović
24 Apr	Hungarian Open; Budapest, Hungary; ATP World Tour 250; Clay (red) – €540,310 – 28S/16Q/16D; Singles – Doubles	(United States) Brian Baker (Croatia) Nikola Mektić; 7–6^{(7–2)}, 6–4	(Colombia) Juan Sebastián Cabal (Colombia) Robert Farah	(Italy) Paolo Lorenzi (Serbia) Laslo Đere	(Slovakia) Martin Kližan (Russia) Andrey Kuznetsov (Spain) Fernando Verdasco (Croatia) Ivo Karlović

=== May ===
Week	Tournament	Champions	Runners-up	Semifinalists	Quarterfinalists
1 May	Estoril Open; Cascais, Portugal; ATP World Tour 250; Clay (red) – €540,310 – 28S/16Q/16D; Singles – Doubles	(Spain) Pablo Carreño Busta; 6–2, 7–6^{(7–5)}	(Luxembourg) Gilles Müller	(Spain) David Ferrer (South Africa) Kevin Anderson	(Spain) Nicolás Almagro (United States) Ryan Harrison (Japan) Taro Daniel (France) Richard Gasquet
1 May	Estoril Open; Cascais, Portugal; ATP World Tour 250; Clay (red) – €540,310 – 28S/16Q/16D; Singles – Doubles	(United States) Ryan Harrison (New Zealand) Michael Venus; 7–5, 6–2	(Spain) David Marrero (Spain) Tommy Robredo	(Spain) David Ferrer (South Africa) Kevin Anderson	(Spain) Nicolás Almagro (United States) Ryan Harrison (Japan) Taro Daniel (France) Richard Gasquet
1 May	Bavarian Championships; Munich, Germany; ATP World Tour 250; Clay (red) – €540,310 – 28S/16Q/16D; Singles – Doubles	(Germany) Alexander Zverev; 6–4, 6–3	(Argentina) Guido Pella	(South Korea) Chung Hyeon (Spain) Roberto Bautista Agut	(Slovakia) Martin Kližan (Argentina) Horacio Zeballos (Germany) Jan-Lennard Struff (Germany) Yannick Hanfmann
1 May	Bavarian Championships; Munich, Germany; ATP World Tour 250; Clay (red) – €540,310 – 28S/16Q/16D; Singles – Doubles	(Colombia) Juan Sebastián Cabal (Colombia) Robert Farah; 6–3, 6–3	(France) Jérémy Chardy (France) Fabrice Martin	(South Korea) Chung Hyeon (Spain) Roberto Bautista Agut	(Slovakia) Martin Kližan (Argentina) Horacio Zeballos (Germany) Jan-Lennard Struff (Germany) Yannick Hanfmann
1 May	Istanbul Open; Istanbul, Turkey; ATP World Tour 250; Clay (red) – €497,255 – 28S/16Q/16D; Singles – Doubles	(Croatia) Marin Čilić; 7–6^{(7–3)}, 6–3	(Canada) Milos Raonic	(Serbia) Viktor Troicki (Argentina) Diego Schwartzman	(Australia) Bernard Tomic (Serbia) Laslo Đere (Serbia) Dušan Lajović (Belgium) Steve Darcis
1 May	Istanbul Open; Istanbul, Turkey; ATP World Tour 250; Clay (red) – €497,255 – 28S/16Q/16D; Singles – Doubles	(Czech Republic) Roman Jebavý (Czech Republic) Jiří Veselý; 6–0, 6–0	(Turkey) Tuna Altuna (Italy) Alessandro Motti	(Serbia) Viktor Troicki (Argentina) Diego Schwartzman	(Australia) Bernard Tomic (Serbia) Laslo Đere (Serbia) Dušan Lajović (Belgium) Steve Darcis
8 May	Madrid Open; Madrid, Spain; ATP World Tour Masters 1000; Clay (red) – €5,439,250 – 56S/28Q/24D; Singles – Doubles	(Spain) Rafael Nadal; 7–6^{(10–8)}, 6–4	(Austria) Dominic Thiem	(Uruguay) Pablo Cuevas (Serbia) Novak Djokovic	(Croatia) Borna Ćorić (Germany) Alexander Zverev (Belgium) David Goffin (Japan) Kei Nishikori
8 May	Madrid Open; Madrid, Spain; ATP World Tour Masters 1000; Clay (red) – €5,439,250 – 56S/28Q/24D; Singles – Doubles	(Poland) Łukasz Kubot (Brazil) Marcelo Melo; 7–5, 6–3	(France) Nicolas Mahut (France) Édouard Roger-Vasselin	(Uruguay) Pablo Cuevas (Serbia) Novak Djokovic	(Croatia) Borna Ćorić (Germany) Alexander Zverev (Belgium) David Goffin (Japan) Kei Nishikori
15 May	Italian Open; Rome, Italy; ATP World Tour Masters 1000; Clay (red) – €4,273,775 – 56S/28Q/24D; Singles – Doubles	(Germany) Alexander Zverev; 6–4, 6–3	(Serbia) Novak Djokovic	(United States) John Isner (Austria) Dominic Thiem	(Canada) Milos Raonic (Croatia) Marin Čilić (Spain) Rafael Nadal (Argentina) Juan Martín del Potro
15 May	Italian Open; Rome, Italy; ATP World Tour Masters 1000; Clay (red) – €4,273,775 – 56S/28Q/24D; Singles – Doubles	(France) Pierre-Hugues Herbert (France) Nicolas Mahut; 4–6, 6–4, [10–3]	(Croatia) Ivan Dodig (Spain) Marcel Granollers	(United States) John Isner (Austria) Dominic Thiem	(Canada) Milos Raonic (Croatia) Marin Čilić (Spain) Rafael Nadal (Argentina) Juan Martín del Potro
22 May	Geneva Open; Geneva, Switzerland; ATP World Tour 250; Clay (red) – €540,310 – 28S/16Q/16D; Singles – Doubles	(Switzerland) Stan Wawrinka; 4–6, 6–3, 6–3	(Germany) Mischa Zverev	(Russia) Andrey Kuznetsov (Japan) Kei Nishikori	(United States) Sam Querrey (Germany) Cedrik-Marcel Stebe (United States) Steve Johnson (South Africa) Kevin Anderson
22 May	Geneva Open; Geneva, Switzerland; ATP World Tour 250; Clay (red) – €540,310 – 28S/16Q/16D; Singles – Doubles	(Netherlands) Jean-Julien Rojer (Romania) Horia Tecău; 2–6, 7–6^{(11–9)}, [10–6]	(Colombia) Juan Sebastián Cabal (Colombia) Robert Farah	(Russia) Andrey Kuznetsov (Japan) Kei Nishikori	(United States) Sam Querrey (Germany) Cedrik-Marcel Stebe (United States) Steve Johnson (South Africa) Kevin Anderson
22 May	Lyon Open; Lyon, France; ATP World Tour 250; Clay (red) – €540,310 – 28S/16Q/16D; Singles – Doubles	(France) Jo-Wilfried Tsonga; 7–6^{(7–2)}, 7–5	(Czech Republic) Tomáš Berdych	(Canada) Milos Raonic (Georgia (country)) Nikoloz Basilashvili	(Portugal) Gastão Elias (France) Gilles Simon (Argentina) Nicolás Kicker (Russia) Karen Khachanov
22 May	Lyon Open; Lyon, France; ATP World Tour 250; Clay (red) – €540,310 – 28S/16Q/16D; Singles – Doubles	(Argentina) Andrés Molteni (Canada) Adil Shamasdin; 6–3, 3–6, [10–5]	(New Zealand) Marcus Daniell (Brazil) Marcelo Demoliner	(Canada) Milos Raonic (Georgia (country)) Nikoloz Basilashvili	(Portugal) Gastão Elias (France) Gilles Simon (Argentina) Nicolás Kicker (Russia) Karen Khachanov
29 May; 5 Jun	French Open; Paris, France; Grand Slam; Clay (red) – €16,790,000; 128S/128Q/64D/32X; Singles – Doubles – Mixed doubles	(Spain) Rafael Nadal; 6–2, 6–3, 6–1	(Switzerland) Stan Wawrinka	(United Kingdom) Andy Murray (Austria) Dominic Thiem	(Japan) Kei Nishikori (Croatia) Marin Čilić (Spain) Pablo Carreño Busta (Serbia) Novak Djokovic
29 May; 5 Jun	French Open; Paris, France; Grand Slam; Clay (red) – €16,790,000; 128S/128Q/64D/32X; Singles – Doubles – Mixed doubles	(United States) Ryan Harrison (New Zealand) Michael Venus; 7–6^{(7–5)}, 6–7^{(4–7)}, 6–3	(Mexico) Santiago González (United States) Donald Young	(United Kingdom) Andy Murray (Austria) Dominic Thiem	(Japan) Kei Nishikori (Croatia) Marin Čilić (Spain) Pablo Carreño Busta (Serbia) Novak Djokovic
29 May; 5 Jun	French Open; Paris, France; Grand Slam; Clay (red) – €16,790,000; 128S/128Q/64D/32X; Singles – Doubles – Mixed doubles	(Canada) Gabriela Dabrowski (India) Rohan Bopanna; 2–6, 6–2, [12–10]	(Germany) Anna-Lena Grönefeld (Colombia) Robert Farah	(United Kingdom) Andy Murray (Austria) Dominic Thiem	(Japan) Kei Nishikori (Croatia) Marin Čilić (Spain) Pablo Carreño Busta (Serbia) Novak Djokovic

=== June ===
Week	Tournament	Champions	Runners-up	Semifinalists	Quarterfinalists
12 Jun	MercedesCup; Stuttgart, Germany; ATP World Tour 250; Grass – €630,785 – 28S/16Q/16D; Singles – Doubles	(France) Lucas Pouille; 4–6, 7–6^{(7–5)}, 6–4	(Spain) Feliciano López	(Germany) Mischa Zverev (France) Benoît Paire	(Germany) Tommy Haas (Czech Republic) Tomáš Berdych (Germany) Philipp Kohlschreiber (Poland) Jerzy Janowicz
12 Jun	MercedesCup; Stuttgart, Germany; ATP World Tour 250; Grass – €630,785 – 28S/16Q/16D; Singles – Doubles	(United Kingdom) Jamie Murray (Brazil) Bruno Soares; 6–7^{(4–7)}, 7–5, [10–5]	(Austria) Oliver Marach (Croatia) Mate Pavić	(Germany) Mischa Zverev (France) Benoît Paire	(Germany) Tommy Haas (Czech Republic) Tomáš Berdych (Germany) Philipp Kohlschreiber (Poland) Jerzy Janowicz
12 Jun	Rosmalen Grass Court Championships 's-Hertogenbosch, Netherlands; ATP World Tour 250; Grass – €660,375 – 28S/16Q/16D; Singles – Doubles	(Luxembourg) Gilles Müller; 7–6^{(7–5)}, 7–6^{(7–4)}	(Croatia) Ivo Karlović	(Croatia) Marin Čilić (Germany) Alexander Zverev	(Canada) Vasek Pospisil (Russia) Daniil Medvedev (United Kingdom) Aljaž Bedene (France) Julien Benneteau
12 Jun	Rosmalen Grass Court Championships 's-Hertogenbosch, Netherlands; ATP World Tour 250; Grass – €660,375 – 28S/16Q/16D; Singles – Doubles	(Poland) Łukasz Kubot (Brazil) Marcelo Melo; 6–3, 6–4	(South Africa) Raven Klaasen (United States) Rajeev Ram	(Croatia) Marin Čilić (Germany) Alexander Zverev	(Canada) Vasek Pospisil (Russia) Daniil Medvedev (United Kingdom) Aljaž Bedene (France) Julien Benneteau
19 Jun	Halle Open; Halle, Germany; ATP World Tour 500; Grass – €1,966,095 – 32S/16Q/16D/4Q; Singles – Doubles	(Switzerland) Roger Federer; 6–1, 6–3	(Germany) Alexander Zverev	(Russia) Karen Khachanov (France) Richard Gasquet	(Germany) Florian Mayer (Russia) Andrey Rublev (Spain) Roberto Bautista Agut (Netherlands) Robin Haase
19 Jun	Halle Open; Halle, Germany; ATP World Tour 500; Grass – €1,966,095 – 32S/16Q/16D/4Q; Singles – Doubles	(Poland) Łukasz Kubot (Brazil) Marcelo Melo; 5–7, 6–3, [10–8]	(Germany) Alexander Zverev (Germany) Mischa Zverev	(Russia) Karen Khachanov (France) Richard Gasquet	(Germany) Florian Mayer (Russia) Andrey Rublev (Spain) Roberto Bautista Agut (Netherlands) Robin Haase
19 Jun	Queen's Club Championships; London, United Kingdom; ATP World Tour 500; Grass – €1,966,095 – 32S/16Q/16D/4Q; Singles – Doubles	(Spain) Feliciano López; 4–6, 7–6^{(7–2)}, 7–6^{(10–8)}	(Croatia) Marin Čilić	(Luxembourg) Gilles Müller (Bulgaria) Grigor Dimitrov	(United States) Sam Querrey (United States) Donald Young (Russia) Daniil Medvedev (Czech Republic) Tomáš Berdych
19 Jun	Queen's Club Championships; London, United Kingdom; ATP World Tour 500; Grass – €1,966,095 – 32S/16Q/16D/4Q; Singles – Doubles	(United Kingdom) Jamie Murray (Brazil) Bruno Soares; 6–2, 6–3	(France) Julien Benneteau (France) Édouard Roger-Vasselin	(Luxembourg) Gilles Müller (Bulgaria) Grigor Dimitrov	(United States) Sam Querrey (United States) Donald Young (Russia) Daniil Medvedev (Czech Republic) Tomáš Berdych
26 Jun	Eastbourne International; Eastbourne, United Kingdom; ATP World Tour 250; Grass – €693,910 – 28S/16Q/16D; Singles – Doubles	(Serbia) Novak Djokovic; 6–3, 6–4	(France) Gaël Monfils	(Russia) Daniil Medvedev (France) Richard Gasquet	(United States) Donald Young (United States) Steve Johnson (United States) John Isner (Australia) Bernard Tomic
26 Jun	Eastbourne International; Eastbourne, United Kingdom; ATP World Tour 250; Grass – €693,910 – 28S/16Q/16D; Singles – Doubles	(United States) Bob Bryan (United States) Mike Bryan; 6–7^{(4–7)}, 6–4, [10–3]	(India) Rohan Bopanna (Brazil) André Sá	(Russia) Daniil Medvedev (France) Richard Gasquet	(United States) Donald Young (United States) Steve Johnson (United States) John Isner (Australia) Bernard Tomic
26 Jun	Antalya Open; Antalya, Turkey; ATP World Tour 250; Grass – $497,255 – 28S/16Q/16D; Singles – Doubles	(Japan) Yūichi Sugita; 6–1, 7–6^{(7–4)}	(France) Adrian Mannarino	(Cyprus) Marcos Baghdatis (Italy) Andreas Seppi	(India) Ramkumar Ramanathan (Germany) Daniel Altmaier (Spain) Fernando Verdasco (Moldova) Radu Albot
26 Jun	Antalya Open; Antalya, Turkey; ATP World Tour 250; Grass – $497,255 – 28S/16Q/16D; Singles – Doubles	(Sweden) Robert Lindstedt (Pakistan) Aisam-ul-Haq Qureshi; 7–5, 4–1 ret.	(Austria) Oliver Marach (Croatia) Mate Pavić	(Cyprus) Marcos Baghdatis (Italy) Andreas Seppi	(India) Ramkumar Ramanathan (Germany) Daniel Altmaier (Spain) Fernando Verdasco (Moldova) Radu Albot

=== July ===
Week	Tournament	Champions	Runners-up	Semifinalists	Quarterfinalists
3 Jul; 10 Jul	Wimbledon; London, United Kingdom; Grand Slam; Grass – £14,840,000; 128S/128Q/64D/16Q/48X; Singles – Doubles – Mixed doubles	(Switzerland) Roger Federer; 6–3, 6–1, 6–4	(Croatia) Marin Čilić	(United States) Sam Querrey (Czech Republic) Tomáš Berdych	(United Kingdom) Andy Murray (Luxembourg) Gilles Müller (Canada) Milos Raonic (Serbia) Novak Djokovic
3 Jul; 10 Jul	Wimbledon; London, United Kingdom; Grand Slam; Grass – £14,840,000; 128S/128Q/64D/16Q/48X; Singles – Doubles – Mixed doubles	(Poland) Łukasz Kubot (Brazil) Marcelo Melo; 5–7, 7–5, 7–6^{(7–2)}, 3–6, 13–11	(Austria) Oliver Marach (Croatia) Mate Pavić	(United States) Sam Querrey (Czech Republic) Tomáš Berdych	(United Kingdom) Andy Murray (Luxembourg) Gilles Müller (Canada) Milos Raonic (Serbia) Novak Djokovic
3 Jul; 10 Jul	Wimbledon; London, United Kingdom; Grand Slam; Grass – £14,840,000; 128S/128Q/64D/16Q/48X; Singles – Doubles – Mixed doubles	(Switzerland) Martina Hingis (United Kingdom) Jamie Murray; 6–4, 6–4	(United Kingdom) Heather Watson (Finland) Henri Kontinen	(United States) Sam Querrey (Czech Republic) Tomáš Berdych	(United Kingdom) Andy Murray (Luxembourg) Gilles Müller (Canada) Milos Raonic (Serbia) Novak Djokovic
17 Jul	Hall of Fame Tennis Championships; Newport, United States; ATP World Tour 250; Grass – $600,345 – 28S/16Q/16D; Singles – Doubles	(United States) John Isner; 6–3, 7–6^{(7–4)}	(Australia) Matthew Ebden	(United States) Bjorn Fratangelo (Germany) Peter Gojowczyk	(United States) Dennis Novikov (France) Pierre-Hugues Herbert (Germany) Tobias Kamke (Croatia) Ivo Karlović
17 Jul	Hall of Fame Tennis Championships; Newport, United States; ATP World Tour 250; Grass – $600,345 – 28S/16Q/16D; Singles – Doubles	(Pakistan) Aisam-ul-Haq Qureshi (United States) Rajeev Ram; 6–4, 4–6, [10–7]	(Australia) Matt Reid (Australia) John-Patrick Smith	(United States) Bjorn Fratangelo (Germany) Peter Gojowczyk	(United States) Dennis Novikov (France) Pierre-Hugues Herbert (Germany) Tobias Kamke (Croatia) Ivo Karlović
17 Jul	Swedish Open; Båstad, Sweden; ATP World Tour 250; Clay (red) – €540,310 – 28S/16Q/16D; Singles – Doubles	(Spain) David Ferrer; 6–4, 6–4	(Ukraine) Alexandr Dolgopolov	(Russia) Andrey Kuznetsov (Spain) Fernando Verdasco	(Argentina) Diego Schwartzman (Russia) Karen Khachanov (Switzerland) Henri Laaksonen (Spain) Albert Ramos Viñolas
17 Jul	Swedish Open; Båstad, Sweden; ATP World Tour 250; Clay (red) – €540,310 – 28S/16Q/16D; Singles – Doubles	(Austria) Julian Knowle (Germany) Philipp Petzschner; 6–2, 3–6, [10–7]	(Netherlands) Sander Arends (Netherlands) Matwé Middelkoop	(Russia) Andrey Kuznetsov (Spain) Fernando Verdasco	(Argentina) Diego Schwartzman (Russia) Karen Khachanov (Switzerland) Henri Laaksonen (Spain) Albert Ramos Viñolas
17 Jul	Croatia Open; Umag, Croatia; ATP World Tour 250; Clay (red) – €540,310 – 28S/16Q/16D; Singles – Doubles	(Russia) Andrey Rublev; 6–4, 6–2	(Italy) Paolo Lorenzi	(Croatia) Ivan Dodig (Italy) Alessandro Giannessi	(Belgium) David Goffin (Italy) Fabio Fognini (Czech Republic) Jiří Veselý (Brazil) Rogério Dutra Silva
17 Jul	Croatia Open; Umag, Croatia; ATP World Tour 250; Clay (red) – €540,310 – 28S/16Q/16D; Singles – Doubles	(Argentina) Guillermo Durán (Argentina) Andrés Molteni; 6–3, 6–7^{(4–7)}, [10–6]	(Croatia) Marin Draganja (Croatia) Tomislav Draganja	(Croatia) Ivan Dodig (Italy) Alessandro Giannessi	(Belgium) David Goffin (Italy) Fabio Fognini (Czech Republic) Jiří Veselý (Brazil) Rogério Dutra Silva
24 Jul	German Open; Hamburg, Germany; ATP World Tour 500; Clay (red) – €1,629,375 – 32S/16Q/16D/4Q; Singles – Doubles	(Argentina) Leonardo Mayer; 6–4, 4–6, 6–3	(Germany) Florian Mayer	(Argentina) Federico Delbonis (Germany) Philipp Kohlschreiber	(Czech Republic) Jiří Veselý (Russia) Karen Khachanov (Argentina) Nicolás Kicker (Argentina) Diego Schwartzman
24 Jul	German Open; Hamburg, Germany; ATP World Tour 500; Clay (red) – €1,629,375 – 32S/16Q/16D/4Q; Singles – Doubles	(Croatia) Ivan Dodig (Croatia) Mate Pavić; 6–3, 6–4	(Uruguay) Pablo Cuevas (Spain) Marc López	(Argentina) Federico Delbonis (Germany) Philipp Kohlschreiber	(Czech Republic) Jiří Veselý (Russia) Karen Khachanov (Argentina) Nicolás Kicker (Argentina) Diego Schwartzman
24 Jul	Atlanta Open; Atlanta, United States; ATP World Tour 250; Hard – $720,410 – 28S/16Q/16D; Singles – Doubles	(United States) John Isner; 7–6^{(8–6)}, 7–6^{(9–7)}	(United States) Ryan Harrison	(United Kingdom) Kyle Edmund (Luxembourg) Gilles Müller	(United States) Jack Sock (United States) Christopher Eubanks (United States) Tommy Paul (Slovakia) Lukáš Lacko
24 Jul	Atlanta Open; Atlanta, United States; ATP World Tour 250; Hard – $720,410 – 28S/16Q/16D; Singles – Doubles	(United States) Bob Bryan (United States) Mike Bryan; 6–3, 6–4	(Netherlands) Wesley Koolhof (New Zealand) Artem Sitak	(United Kingdom) Kyle Edmund (Luxembourg) Gilles Müller	(United States) Jack Sock (United States) Christopher Eubanks (United States) Tommy Paul (Slovakia) Lukáš Lacko
24 Jul	Swiss Open; Gstaad, Switzerland; ATP World Tour 250; Clay (red) – €540,310 – 28S/16Q/16D; Singles – Doubles	(Italy) Fabio Fognini; 6–4, 7–5	(Germany) Yannick Hanfmann	(Netherlands) Robin Haase (Spain) Roberto Bautista Agut	(Belgium) David Goffin (Portugal) João Sousa (Latvia) Ernests Gulbis (Uzbekistan) Denis Istomin
24 Jul	Swiss Open; Gstaad, Switzerland; ATP World Tour 250; Clay (red) – €540,310 – 28S/16Q/16D; Singles – Doubles	(Austria) Oliver Marach (Austria) Philipp Oswald; 6–3, 4–6, [10–8]	(France) Jonathan Eysseric (Croatia) Franko Škugor	(Netherlands) Robin Haase (Spain) Roberto Bautista Agut	(Belgium) David Goffin (Portugal) João Sousa (Latvia) Ernests Gulbis (Uzbekistan) Denis Istomin
31 Jul	Washington Open; Washington, D.C., United States; ATP World Tour 500; Hard – $2,002,460 – 48S/24Q/16D/4Q; Singles – Doubles	(Germany) Alexander Zverev; 6–4, 6–4	(South Africa) Kevin Anderson	(United States) Jack Sock (Japan) Kei Nishikori	(India) Yuki Bhambri (Canada) Milos Raonic (Russia) Daniil Medvedev (United States) Tommy Paul
31 Jul	Washington Open; Washington, D.C., United States; ATP World Tour 500; Hard – $2,002,460 – 48S/24Q/16D/4Q; Singles – Doubles	(Finland) Henri Kontinen (Australia) John Peers; 7–6^{(7–5)}, 6–4	(Poland) Łukasz Kubot (Brazil) Marcelo Melo	(United States) Jack Sock (Japan) Kei Nishikori	(India) Yuki Bhambri (Canada) Milos Raonic (Russia) Daniil Medvedev (United States) Tommy Paul
31 Jul	Los Cabos Open; Cabo San Lucas, Mexico; ATP World Tour 250; Hard – $727,995 – 28S/16Q/16D; Singles – Doubles	(United States) Sam Querrey; 6–3, 3–6, 6–2	(Australia) Thanasi Kokkinakis	(Czech Republic) Tomáš Berdych (Bosnia and Herzegovina) Damir Džumhur	(France) Adrian Mannarino (United States) Taylor Fritz (Spain) Feliciano López (France) Vincent Millot
31 Jul	Los Cabos Open; Cabo San Lucas, Mexico; ATP World Tour 250; Hard – $727,995 – 28S/16Q/16D; Singles – Doubles	(Colombia) Juan Sebastián Cabal (Philippines) Treat Huey; 6–2, 6–3	(Peru) Sergio Galdós (Venezuela) Roberto Maytín	(Czech Republic) Tomáš Berdych (Bosnia and Herzegovina) Damir Džumhur	(France) Adrian Mannarino (United States) Taylor Fritz (Spain) Feliciano López (France) Vincent Millot
31 Jul	Austrian Open Kitzbühel; Kitzbühel, Austria; ATP World Tour 250; Clay (red) – €540,310 – 28S/16Q/16D; Singles – Doubles	(Germany) Philipp Kohlschreiber; 6–3, 6–4	(Portugal) João Sousa	(Austria) Sebastian Ofner (Italy) Fabio Fognini	(Argentina) Renzo Olivo (Austria) Gerald Melzer (Serbia) Dušan Lajović (Brazil) Thomaz Bellucci
31 Jul	Austrian Open Kitzbühel; Kitzbühel, Austria; ATP World Tour 250; Clay (red) – €540,310 – 28S/16Q/16D; Singles – Doubles	(Uruguay) Pablo Cuevas (Argentina) Guillermo Durán; 6–4, 4–6, [12–10]	(Chile) Hans Podlipnik Castillo (Belarus) Andrei Vasilevski	(Austria) Sebastian Ofner (Italy) Fabio Fognini	(Argentina) Renzo Olivo (Austria) Gerald Melzer (Serbia) Dušan Lajović (Brazil) Thomaz Bellucci

=== August ===
Week	Tournament	Champions	Runners-up	Semifinalists	Quarterfinalists
7 Aug	Canadian Open; Montreal, Canada; ATP World Tour Masters 1000; Hard – $4,662,300 – 56S/28Q/24D; Singles – Doubles	(Germany) Alexander Zverev; 6–3, 6–4	(Switzerland) Roger Federer	(Canada) Denis Shapovalov (Netherlands) Robin Haase	(France) Adrian Mannarino (South Africa) Kevin Anderson (Argentina) Diego Schwartzman (Spain) Roberto Bautista Agut
7 Aug	Canadian Open; Montreal, Canada; ATP World Tour Masters 1000; Hard – $4,662,300 – 56S/28Q/24D; Singles – Doubles	(France) Pierre-Hugues Herbert (France) Nicolas Mahut; 6–4, 3–6, [10–6]	(India) Rohan Bopanna (Croatia) Ivan Dodig	(Canada) Denis Shapovalov (Netherlands) Robin Haase	(France) Adrian Mannarino (South Africa) Kevin Anderson (Argentina) Diego Schwartzman (Spain) Roberto Bautista Agut
14 Aug	Cincinnati Masters; Mason, United States; ATP World Tour Masters 1000; Hard – $4,973,120 – 56S/28Q/24D; Singles – Doubles	(Bulgaria) Grigor Dimitrov; 6–3, 7–5	(Australia) Nick Kyrgios	(Spain) David Ferrer (United States) John Isner	(Spain) Rafael Nadal (Austria) Dominic Thiem (United States) Jared Donaldson (Japan) Yūichi Sugita
14 Aug	Cincinnati Masters; Mason, United States; ATP World Tour Masters 1000; Hard – $4,973,120 – 56S/28Q/24D; Singles – Doubles	(France) Pierre-Hugues Herbert (France) Nicolas Mahut; 7–6^{(8–6)}, 6–4	(United Kingdom) Jamie Murray (Brazil) Bruno Soares	(Spain) David Ferrer (United States) John Isner	(Spain) Rafael Nadal (Austria) Dominic Thiem (United States) Jared Donaldson (Japan) Yūichi Sugita
21 Aug	Winston-Salem Open; Winston-Salem, United States; ATP World Tour 250; Hard – $748,960 – 48S/16Q/16D; Singles – Doubles	(Spain) Roberto Bautista Agut; 6–4, 6–4	(Bosnia and Herzegovina) Damir Džumhur	(Germany) Jan-Lennard Struff (United Kingdom) Kyle Edmund	(United States) Taylor Fritz (Croatia) Borna Ćorić (United States) Steve Johnson (South Korea) Chung Hyeon
21 Aug	Winston-Salem Open; Winston-Salem, United States; ATP World Tour 250; Hard – $748,960 – 48S/16Q/16D; Singles – Doubles	(Netherlands) Jean-Julien Rojer (Romania) Horia Tecău; 6–3, 6–4	(Chile) Julio Peralta (Argentina) Horacio Zeballos	(Germany) Jan-Lennard Struff (United Kingdom) Kyle Edmund	(United States) Taylor Fritz (Croatia) Borna Ćorić (United States) Steve Johnson (South Korea) Chung Hyeon
28 Aug; 4 Sep	US Open; New York City, United States; Grand Slam; Hard – $23,943,400; 128S/128Q/64D/32X; Singles – Doubles – Mixed doubles	(Spain) Rafael Nadal; 6–3, 6–3, 6–4	(South Africa) Kevin Anderson	(Argentina) Juan Martín del Potro (Spain) Pablo Carreño Busta	(Russia) Andrey Rublev (Switzerland) Roger Federer (United States) Sam Querrey (Argentina) Diego Schwartzman
28 Aug; 4 Sep	US Open; New York City, United States; Grand Slam; Hard – $23,943,400; 128S/128Q/64D/32X; Singles – Doubles – Mixed doubles	(Netherlands) Jean-Julien Rojer (Romania) Horia Tecău; 6–4, 6–3	(Spain) Feliciano López (Spain) Marc López	(Argentina) Juan Martín del Potro (Spain) Pablo Carreño Busta	(Russia) Andrey Rublev (Switzerland) Roger Federer (United States) Sam Querrey (Argentina) Diego Schwartzman
28 Aug; 4 Sep	US Open; New York City, United States; Grand Slam; Hard – $23,943,400; 128S/128Q/64D/32X; Singles – Doubles – Mixed doubles	(Switzerland) Martina Hingis (United Kingdom) Jamie Murray; 6–1, 4–6, [10–8]	(Chinese Taipei) Chan Hao-ching (New Zealand) Michael Venus	(Argentina) Juan Martín del Potro (Spain) Pablo Carreño Busta	(Russia) Andrey Rublev (Switzerland) Roger Federer (United States) Sam Querrey (Argentina) Diego Schwartzman

=== September ===
Week	Tournament	Champions	Runners-up	Semifinalists	Quarterfinalists
11 Sep	Davis Cup Semi-finals; Brussels, Belgium – clay (i); Lille, France – clay	Semi-finals winners Belgium 3–2; France 3–1	Semi-finals losers Australia; Serbia		
18 Sep	St. Petersburg Open; St. Petersburg, Russia; ATP World Tour 250; Hard (i) – $1,064,715 – 28S/16Q/16D; Singles – Doubles	(Bosnia and Herzegovina) Damir Džumhur; 3–6, 6–4, 6–2	(Italy) Fabio Fognini	(Spain) Roberto Bautista Agut (Germany) Jan-Lennard Struff	(Serbia) Viktor Troicki (Lithuania) Ričardas Berankis (United Kingdom) Liam Broady (France) Jo-Wilfried Tsonga
18 Sep	St. Petersburg Open; St. Petersburg, Russia; ATP World Tour 250; Hard (i) – $1,064,715 – 28S/16Q/16D; Singles – Doubles	(Czech Republic) Roman Jebavý (Netherlands) Matwé Middelkoop; 6–4, 6–4	(Chile) Julio Peralta (Argentina) Horacio Zeballos	(Spain) Roberto Bautista Agut (Germany) Jan-Lennard Struff	(Serbia) Viktor Troicki (Lithuania) Ričardas Berankis (United Kingdom) Liam Broady (France) Jo-Wilfried Tsonga
18 Sep	Moselle Open; Metz, France; ATP World Tour 250; Hard (i) – €540,310 – 28S/16Q/16D; Singles – Doubles	(Germany) Peter Gojowczyk; 7–5, 6–2	(France) Benoît Paire	(Germany) Mischa Zverev (Georgia (country)) Nikoloz Basilashvili	(France) Kenny de Schepper (Romania) Marius Copil (Uzbekistan) Denis Istomin (Belgium) David Goffin
18 Sep	Moselle Open; Metz, France; ATP World Tour 250; Hard (i) – €540,310 – 28S/16Q/16D; Singles – Doubles	(France) Julien Benneteau (France) Édouard Roger-Vasselin; 7–5, 6–3	(Netherlands) Wesley Koolhof (New Zealand) Artem Sitak	(Germany) Mischa Zverev (Georgia (country)) Nikoloz Basilashvili	(France) Kenny de Schepper (Romania) Marius Copil (Uzbekistan) Denis Istomin (Belgium) David Goffin
25 Sep	Chengdu Open; Chengdu, China; ATP World Tour 250; Hard – $1,138,910 – 28S/16Q/16D; Singles – Doubles	(Uzbekistan) Denis Istomin; 3–2 ret.	(Cyprus) Marcos Baghdatis	(Argentina) Guido Pella (Japan) Yūichi Sugita	(United States) Taylor Fritz (Chinese Taipei) Lu Yen-hsun (United States) Jared Donaldson (Serbia) Dušan Lajović
25 Sep	Chengdu Open; Chengdu, China; ATP World Tour 250; Hard – $1,138,910 – 28S/16Q/16D; Singles – Doubles	(Israel) Jonathan Erlich (Pakistan) Aisam-ul-Haq Qureshi; 6–3, 7–6^{(7–3)}	(New Zealand) Marcus Daniell (Brazil) Marcelo Demoliner	(Argentina) Guido Pella (Japan) Yūichi Sugita	(United States) Taylor Fritz (Chinese Taipei) Lu Yen-hsun (United States) Jared Donaldson (Serbia) Dušan Lajović
25 Sep	Shenzhen Open; Shenzhen, China; ATP World Tour 250; Hard – $731,680 – 28S/16Q/16D; Singles – Doubles	(Belgium) David Goffin; 6–4, 6–7^{(5–7)}, 6–3	(Ukraine) Alexandr Dolgopolov	(Bosnia and Herzegovina) Damir Džumhur (Switzerland) Henri Laaksonen	(Germany) Alexander Zverev (Israel) Dudi Sela (China) Zhang Zhizhen (United States) Donald Young
25 Sep	Shenzhen Open; Shenzhen, China; ATP World Tour 250; Hard – $731,680 – 28S/16Q/16D; Singles – Doubles	(Austria) Alexander Peya (United States) Rajeev Ram; 6–3, 6–2	(Croatia) Nikola Mektić (United States) Nicholas Monroe	(Bosnia and Herzegovina) Damir Džumhur (Switzerland) Henri Laaksonen	(Germany) Alexander Zverev (Israel) Dudi Sela (China) Zhang Zhizhen (United States) Donald Young

=== October ===
Week	Tournament	Champions	Runners-up	Semifinalists	Quarterfinalists
2 Oct	China Open; Beijing, China; ATP World Tour 500; Hard – $4,280,460 – 32S/16Q/16D/4Q; Singles – Doubles	(Spain) Rafael Nadal; 6–2, 6–1	(Australia) Nick Kyrgios	(Bulgaria) Grigor Dimitrov (Germany) Alexander Zverev	(United States) John Isner (Spain) Roberto Bautista Agut (Belgium) Steve Darcis (Russia) Andrey Rublev
2 Oct	China Open; Beijing, China; ATP World Tour 500; Hard – $4,280,460 – 32S/16Q/16D/4Q; Singles – Doubles	(Finland) Henri Kontinen (Australia) John Peers; 6–3, 3–6, [10–7]	(United States) John Isner (United States) Jack Sock	(Bulgaria) Grigor Dimitrov (Germany) Alexander Zverev	(United States) John Isner (Spain) Roberto Bautista Agut (Belgium) Steve Darcis (Russia) Andrey Rublev
2 Oct	Japan Open; Tokyo, Japan; ATP World Tour 500; Hard – $1,706,175 – 32S/16Q/16D/4Q; Singles – Doubles	(Belgium) David Goffin; 6–3, 7–5	(France) Adrian Mannarino	(Croatia) Marin Čilić (Argentina) Diego Schwartzman	(United States) Ryan Harrison (Japan) Yūichi Sugita (France) Richard Gasquet (United States) Steve Johnson
2 Oct	Japan Open; Tokyo, Japan; ATP World Tour 500; Hard – $1,706,175 – 32S/16Q/16D/4Q; Singles – Doubles	(Japan) Ben McLachlan (Japan) Yasutaka Uchiyama; 6–4, 7–6^{(7–1)}	(United Kingdom) Jamie Murray (Brazil) Bruno Soares	(Croatia) Marin Čilić (Argentina) Diego Schwartzman	(United States) Ryan Harrison (Japan) Yūichi Sugita (France) Richard Gasquet (United States) Steve Johnson
9 Oct	Shanghai Masters; Shanghai, China; ATP World Tour Masters 1000; Hard – $6,216,400 – 56S/28Q/24D; Singles – Doubles	(Switzerland) Roger Federer; 6–4, 6–3	(Spain) Rafael Nadal	(Croatia) Marin Čilić (Argentina) Juan Martín del Potro	(Bulgaria) Grigor Dimitrov (Spain) Albert Ramos Viñolas (Serbia) Viktor Troicki (France) Richard Gasquet
9 Oct	Shanghai Masters; Shanghai, China; ATP World Tour Masters 1000; Hard – $6,216,400 – 56S/28Q/24D; Singles – Doubles	(Finland) Henri Kontinen (Australia) John Peers; 6–4, 6–2	(Poland) Łukasz Kubot (Brazil) Marcelo Melo	(Croatia) Marin Čilić (Argentina) Juan Martín del Potro	(Bulgaria) Grigor Dimitrov (Spain) Albert Ramos Viñolas (Serbia) Viktor Troicki (France) Richard Gasquet
16 Oct	Kremlin Cup; Moscow, Russia; ATP World Tour 250; Hard (i) – $823,600 – 28S/16Q/16D; Singles – Doubles	(Bosnia and Herzegovina) Damir Džumhur; 6–2, 1–6, 6–4	(Lithuania) Ričardas Berankis	(Bosnia and Herzegovina) Mirza Bašić (France) Adrian Mannarino	(Russia) Daniil Medvedev (Italy) Andreas Seppi (Israel) Dudi Sela (Kazakhstan) Alexander Bublik
16 Oct	Kremlin Cup; Moscow, Russia; ATP World Tour 250; Hard (i) – $823,600 – 28S/16Q/16D; Singles – Doubles	(Belarus) Max Mirnyi (Austria) Philipp Oswald; 6–3, 7–5	(Bosnia and Herzegovina) Damir Džumhur (Croatia) Antonio Šančić	(Bosnia and Herzegovina) Mirza Bašić (France) Adrian Mannarino	(Russia) Daniil Medvedev (Italy) Andreas Seppi (Israel) Dudi Sela (Kazakhstan) Alexander Bublik
16 Oct	European Open; Antwerp, Belgium; ATP World Tour 250; Hard (i) – €660,375 – 28S/16Q/16D; Singles – Doubles	(France) Jo-Wilfried Tsonga; 6–3, 7–5	(Argentina) Diego Schwartzman	(Greece) Stefanos Tsitsipas (Belgium) Ruben Bemelmans	(Belgium) David Goffin (Spain) David Ferrer (Portugal) João Sousa (France) Julien Benneteau
16 Oct	European Open; Antwerp, Belgium; ATP World Tour 250; Hard (i) – €660,375 – 28S/16Q/16D; Singles – Doubles	(United States) Scott Lipsky (India) Divij Sharan; 6–4, 2–6, [10–5]	(Mexico) Santiago González (Chile) Julio Peralta	(Greece) Stefanos Tsitsipas (Belgium) Ruben Bemelmans	(Belgium) David Goffin (Spain) David Ferrer (Portugal) João Sousa (France) Julien Benneteau
16 Oct	Stockholm Open; Stockholm, Sweden; ATP World Tour 250; Hard (i) – €660,375 – 28S/16Q/16D; Singles – Doubles	(Argentina) Juan Martín del Potro; 6–4, 6–2	(Bulgaria) Grigor Dimitrov	(Italy) Fabio Fognini (Spain) Fernando Verdasco	(Germany) Mischa Zverev (United States) Jack Sock (Japan) Yūichi Sugita (South Africa) Kevin Anderson
16 Oct	Stockholm Open; Stockholm, Sweden; ATP World Tour 250; Hard (i) – €660,375 – 28S/16Q/16D; Singles – Doubles	(Austria) Oliver Marach (Croatia) Mate Pavić; 3–6, 7–6^{(8–6)}, [10–4]	(Pakistan) Aisam-ul-Haq Qureshi (Netherlands) Jean-Julien Rojer	(Italy) Fabio Fognini (Spain) Fernando Verdasco	(Germany) Mischa Zverev (United States) Jack Sock (Japan) Yūichi Sugita (South Africa) Kevin Anderson
23 Oct	Vienna Open; Vienna, Austria; ATP World Tour 500; Hard (i) – €2,621,850 – 32S/16Q/16D/4Q; Singles – Doubles	(France) Lucas Pouille; 6–1, 6–4	(France) Jo-Wilfried Tsonga	(Germany) Philipp Kohlschreiber (United Kingdom) Kyle Edmund	(Germany) Alexander Zverev (Argentina) Diego Schwartzman (Germany) Jan-Lennard Struff (France) Richard Gasquet
23 Oct	Vienna Open; Vienna, Austria; ATP World Tour 500; Hard (i) – €2,621,850 – 32S/16Q/16D/4Q; Singles – Doubles	(India) Rohan Bopanna (Uruguay) Pablo Cuevas; 7–6^{(9–7)}, 6–7^{(4–7)}, [11–9]	(Brazil) Marcelo Demoliner (United States) Sam Querrey	(Germany) Philipp Kohlschreiber (United Kingdom) Kyle Edmund	(Germany) Alexander Zverev (Argentina) Diego Schwartzman (Germany) Jan-Lennard Struff (France) Richard Gasquet
23 Oct	Swiss Indoors; Basel, Switzerland; ATP World Tour 500; Hard (i) – €2,291,860 – 32S/16Q/16D/4Q; Singles – Doubles	(Switzerland) Roger Federer; 6–7^{(5–7)}, 6–4, 6–3	(Argentina) Juan Martín del Potro	(Belgium) David Goffin (Croatia) Marin Čilić	(France) Adrian Mannarino (United States) Jack Sock (Spain) Roberto Bautista Agut (Hungary) Márton Fucsovics
23 Oct	Swiss Indoors; Basel, Switzerland; ATP World Tour 500; Hard (i) – €2,291,860 – 32S/16Q/16D/4Q; Singles – Doubles	(Croatia) Ivan Dodig (Spain) Marcel Granollers; 7–5, 7–6^{(8–6)}	(France) Fabrice Martin (France) Édouard Roger-Vasselin	(Belgium) David Goffin (Croatia) Marin Čilić	(France) Adrian Mannarino (United States) Jack Sock (Spain) Roberto Bautista Agut (Hungary) Márton Fucsovics
30 Oct	Paris Masters; Paris, France; ATP World Tour Masters 1000; Hard (i) – €4,273,775 – 48S/24Q/24D; Singles – Doubles	(United States) Jack Sock; 5–7, 6–4, 6–1	(Serbia) Filip Krajinović	(United States) John Isner (France) Julien Benneteau	(Spain) Rafael Nadal (Argentina) Juan Martín del Potro (Croatia) Marin Čilić (Spain) Fernando Verdasco
30 Oct	Paris Masters; Paris, France; ATP World Tour Masters 1000; Hard (i) – €4,273,775 – 48S/24Q/24D; Singles – Doubles	(Poland) Łukasz Kubot (Brazil) Marcelo Melo; 7–6^{(7–3)}, 3–6, [10–6]	(Croatia) Ivan Dodig (Spain) Marcel Granollers	(United States) John Isner (France) Julien Benneteau	(Spain) Rafael Nadal (Argentina) Juan Martín del Potro (Croatia) Marin Čilić (Spain) Fernando Verdasco

=== November ===
Week	Tournament	Champions	Runners-up	Semifinalists	Quarterfinalists
6 Nov	Next Gen ATP Finals; Milan, Italy; Next Generation ATP Finals; Hard (i) – $1,275,000 – 8S (RR); Singles	(South Korea) Chung Hyeon; 3–4^{(5–7)}, 4–3^{(7–2)}, 4–2, 4–2	(Russia) Andrey Rublev	(Russia) Daniil Medvedev (3rd) (Croatia) Borna Ćorić (4th)	Round Robin (Italy) Gianluigi Quinzi (United States) Jared Donaldson (Canada) Denis Shapovalov (Russia) Karen Khachanov
13 Nov	ATP Finals; London, United Kingdom; ATP Finals; Hard (i) – $8,000,000 – 8S/8D (RR); Singles – Doubles	(Bulgaria) Grigor Dimitrov; 7–5, 4–6, 6–3	(Belgium) David Goffin	(United States) Jack Sock (Switzerland) Roger Federer	Round Robin (Austria) Dominic Thiem (Spain) Pablo Carreño Busta (Spain) Rafael Nadal (Germany) Alexander Zverev (Croatia) Marin Čilić
13 Nov	ATP Finals; London, United Kingdom; ATP Finals; Hard (i) – $8,000,000 – 8S/8D (RR); Singles – Doubles	(Finland) Henri Kontinen (Australia) John Peers; 6–4, 6–2	(Poland) Łukasz Kubot (Brazil) Marcelo Melo	(United States) Jack Sock (Switzerland) Roger Federer	Round Robin (Austria) Dominic Thiem (Spain) Pablo Carreño Busta (Spain) Rafael Nadal (Germany) Alexander Zverev (Croatia) Marin Čilić
20 Nov	Davis Cup Final; Lille, France – hard (i)	France; 3–2	Belgium		

== Statistical information ==
These tables present the number of singles (S), doubles (D), and mixed doubles (X) titles won by each player and each nation during the season, within all the tournament categories of the 2017 ATP World Tour: the Grand Slam tournaments, the ATP Finals, the ATP World Tour Masters 1000, the ATP World Tour 500 series, and the ATP World Tour 250 series. The players/nations are sorted by:

1. Total number of titles (a doubles title won by two players representing the same nation counts as only one win for the nation);
2. Cumulated importance of those titles (one Grand Slam win equalling two Masters 1000 wins, one undefeated ATP Finals win equalling one-and-a-half Masters 1000 win, one Masters 1000 win equalling two 500 events wins, one 500 event win equalling two 250 events wins);
3. A singles > doubles > mixed doubles hierarchy;
4. Alphabetical order (by family names for players).

Key
Grand Slam
ATP Finals
ATP World Tour Masters 1000
ATP World Tour 500
ATP World Tour 250

=== Titles won by player ===
Total	Player	Grand Slam			ATP Finals		Masters 1000		Tour 500		Tour 250		Total		
Total	Player	S	D	X	S	D	S	D	S	D	S	D	S	D	X
7	Roger Federer (SUI)	● ●					● ● ●		● ●				7	0	0
6	Rafael Nadal (ESP)	● ●					● ●		● ●				6	0	0
6	Łukasz Kubot (POL)		●					● ● ●		●		●	0	6	0
6	Marcelo Melo (BRA)		●					● ● ●		●		●	0	6	0
6	Alexander Zverev (GER)						● ●		●		● ●	●	5	1	0
5	Jamie Murray (GBR)			● ●						● ●		●	0	3	2
5	Henri Kontinen (FIN)		●			●		●		● ●			0	5	0
5	John Peers (AUS)		●			●		●		● ●			0	5	0
5	Pablo Cuevas (URU)							●		● ●	●	●	1	4	0
5	Aisam-ul-Haq Qureshi (PAK)									●		● ● ● ●	0	5	0
4	Jean-Julien Rojer (NED)		●							●		● ●	0	4	0
4	Horia Tecău (ROU)		●							●		● ●	0	4	0
4	Rohan Bopanna (IND)			●				●		●		●	0	3	1
4	Juan Sebastián Cabal (COL)			●								● ● ●	0	3	1
4	Grigor Dimitrov (BUL)				●		●				● ●		4	0	0
4	Nicolas Mahut (FRA)							● ● ●				●	0	4	0
4	Rajeev Ram (USA)							●				● ● ●	0	4	0
4	Jo-Wilfried Tsonga (FRA)								●		● ● ●		4	0	0
3	Ryan Harrison (USA)		●								●	●	1	2	0
3	Pierre-Hugues Herbert (FRA)							● ● ●					0	3	0
3	Jack Sock (USA)						●				● ●		3	0	0
3	Lucas Pouille (FRA)								●		● ●		3	0	0
3	Ivan Dodig (CRO)									● ● ●			0	3	0
3	Bruno Soares (BRA)									● ●		●	0	3	0
3	Mate Pavić (CRO)									●		● ●	0	3	0
3	Philipp Oswald (AUT)											● ● ●	0	3	0
2	Michael Venus (NZL)		●									●	0	2	0
2	Raven Klaasen (RSA)							●				●	0	2	0
2	Marcel Granollers (ESP)									● ●			0	2	0
2	Sam Querrey (USA)								●		●		2	0	0
2	David Goffin (BEL)								●		●		2	0	0
2	Pablo Carreño Busta (ESP)									●	●		1	1	0
2	Roberto Bautista Agut (ESP)										● ●		2	0	0
2	Novak Djokovic (SRB)										● ●		2	0	0
2	Damir Džumhur (BIH)										● ●		2	0	0
2	John Isner (USA)										● ●		2	0	0
2	Gilles Müller (LUX)										● ●		2	0	0
2	Brian Baker (USA)											● ●	0	2	0
2	Julien Benneteau (FRA)											● ●	0	2	0
2	Bob Bryan (USA)											● ●	0	2	0
2	Mike Bryan (USA)											● ●	0	2	0
2	Guillermo Durán (ARG)											● ●	0	2	0
2	Robert Farah (COL)											● ●	0	2	0
2	Roman Jebavý (CZE)											● ●	0	2	0
2	Oliver Marach (AUT)											● ●	0	2	0
2	Nikola Mektić (CRO)											● ●	0	2	0
2	Matwé Middelkoop (NED)											● ●	0	2	0
2	Andrés Molteni (ARG)											● ●	0	2	0
1	Feliciano López (ESP)								●				1	0	0
1	Leonardo Mayer (ARG)								●				1	0	0
1	Andy Murray (GBR)								●				1	0	0
1	Dominic Thiem (AUT)								●				1	0	0
1	Ben McLachlan (JPN)									●			0	1	0
1	Florin Mergea (ROU)									●			0	1	0
1	Yasutaka Uchiyama (JPN)									●			0	1	0
1	Marin Čilić (CRO)										●		1	0	0
1	Borna Ćorić (CRO)										●		1	0	0
1	Juan Martín del Potro (ARG)										●		1	0	0
1	Alexandr Dolgopolov (UKR)										●		1	0	0
1	Víctor Estrella Burgos (DOM)										●		1	0	0
1	David Ferrer (ESP)										●		1	0	0
1	Fabio Fognini (ITA)										●		1	0	0
1	Peter Gojowczyk (GER)										●		1	0	0
1	Denis Istomin (UZB)										●		1	0	0
1	Steve Johnson (USA)										●		1	0	0
1	Philipp Kohlschreiber (GER)										●		1	0	0
1	Andrey Rublev (RUS)										●		1	0	0
1	Yūichi Sugita (JPN)										●		1	0	0
1	Stan Wawrinka (SUI)										●		1	0	0
1	Jérémy Chardy (FRA)											●	0	1	0
1	James Cerretani (USA)											●	0	1	0
1	Rogério Dutra Silva (BRA)											●	0	1	0
1	Jonathan Erlich (ISR)											●	0	1	0
1	Treat Huey (PHI)											●	0	1	0
1	Dominic Inglot (GBR)											●	0	1	0
1	Julian Knowle (AUT)											●	0	1	0
1	Thanasi Kokkinakis (AUS)											●	0	1	0
1	Wesley Koolhof (NED)											●	0	1	0
1	Robert Lindstedt (SWE)											●	0	1	0
1	Scott Lipsky (USA)											●	0	1	0
1	Fabrice Martin (FRA)											●	0	1	0
1	Marcin Matkowski (POL)											●	0	1	0
1	Max Mirnyi (BLR)											●	0	1	0
1	Jeevan Nedunchezhiyan (IND)											●	0	1	0
1	Julio Peralta (CHI)											●	0	1	0
1	Philipp Petzschner (GER)											●	0	1	0
1	Alexander Peya (AUT)											●	0	1	0
1	Édouard Roger-Vasselin (FRA)											●	0	1	0
1	André Sá (BRA)											●	0	1	0
1	Adil Shamasdin (CAN)											●	0	1	0
1	Divij Sharan (IND)											●	0	1	0
1	Jordan Thompson (AUS)											●	0	1	0
1	Viktor Troicki (SRB)											●	0	1	0
1	Jiří Veselý (CZE)											●	0	1	0
1	Horacio Zeballos (ARG)											●	0	1	0
1	Nenad Zimonjić (SRB)											●	0	1	0
1	Mischa Zverev (GER)											●	0	1	0

=== Titles won by nation ===
Total	Nation	Grand Slam			ATP Finals		Masters 1000		Tour 500		Tour 250		Total		
Total	Nation	S	D	X	S	D	S	D	S	D	S	D	S	D	X
21	United States (USA)		1				1	1	1		7	10	9	12	0
14	Spain (ESP)	2					2		3	3	4		11	3	0
13	France (FRA)							3	2		5	3	7	6	0
10	Brazil (BRA)		1					3		3		3	0	10	0
9	Germany (GER)						2		1		4	2	7	2	0
9	Croatia (CRO)									3	3	3	2	7	0
8	Switzerland (SUI)	2					3		2		1		8	0	0
7	Great Britain (GBR)			2					1	2		2	1	4	2
7	Poland (POL)		1					3		1		2	0	7	0
7	Austria (AUT)								1			6	1	6	0
6	Australia (AUS)		1			1		1		2		1	0	6	0
6	Netherlands (NED)		1							1		4	0	6	0
6	Argentina (ARG)								1		1	4	2	4	0
5	Finland (FIN)		1			1		1		2			0	5	0
5	Romania (ROU)		1							2		2	0	5	0
5	India (IND)			1				1		1		2	0	4	1
5	Uruguay (URU)							1		2	1	1	1	4	0
5	Pakistan (PAK)									1		4	0	5	0
4	Colombia (COL)			1								3	0	3	1
4	Bulgaria (BUL)				1		1				2		4	0	0
3	Serbia (SRB)										2	1	2	1	0
2	New Zealand (NZL)		1									1	0	2	0
2	South Africa (RSA)							1				1	0	2	0
2	Belgium (BEL)								1		1		2	0	0
2	Japan (JPN)									1	1		1	1	0
2	Bosnia and Herzegovina (BIH)										2		2	0	0
2	Luxembourg (LUX)										2		2	0	0
2	Czech Republic (CZE)											2	0	2	0
1	Dominican Republic (DOM)										1		1	0	0
1	Italy (ITA)										1		1	0	0
1	Russia (RUS)										1		1	0	0
1	Ukraine (UKR)										1		1	0	0
1	Uzbekistan (UZB)										1		1	0	0
1	Belarus (BLR)											1	0	1	0
1	Canada (CAN)											1	0	1	0
1	Chile (CHI)											1	0	1	0
1	Israel (ISR)											1	0	1	0
1	Philippines (PHI)											1	0	1	0
1	Sweden (SWE)											1	0	1	0

=== Titles information ===
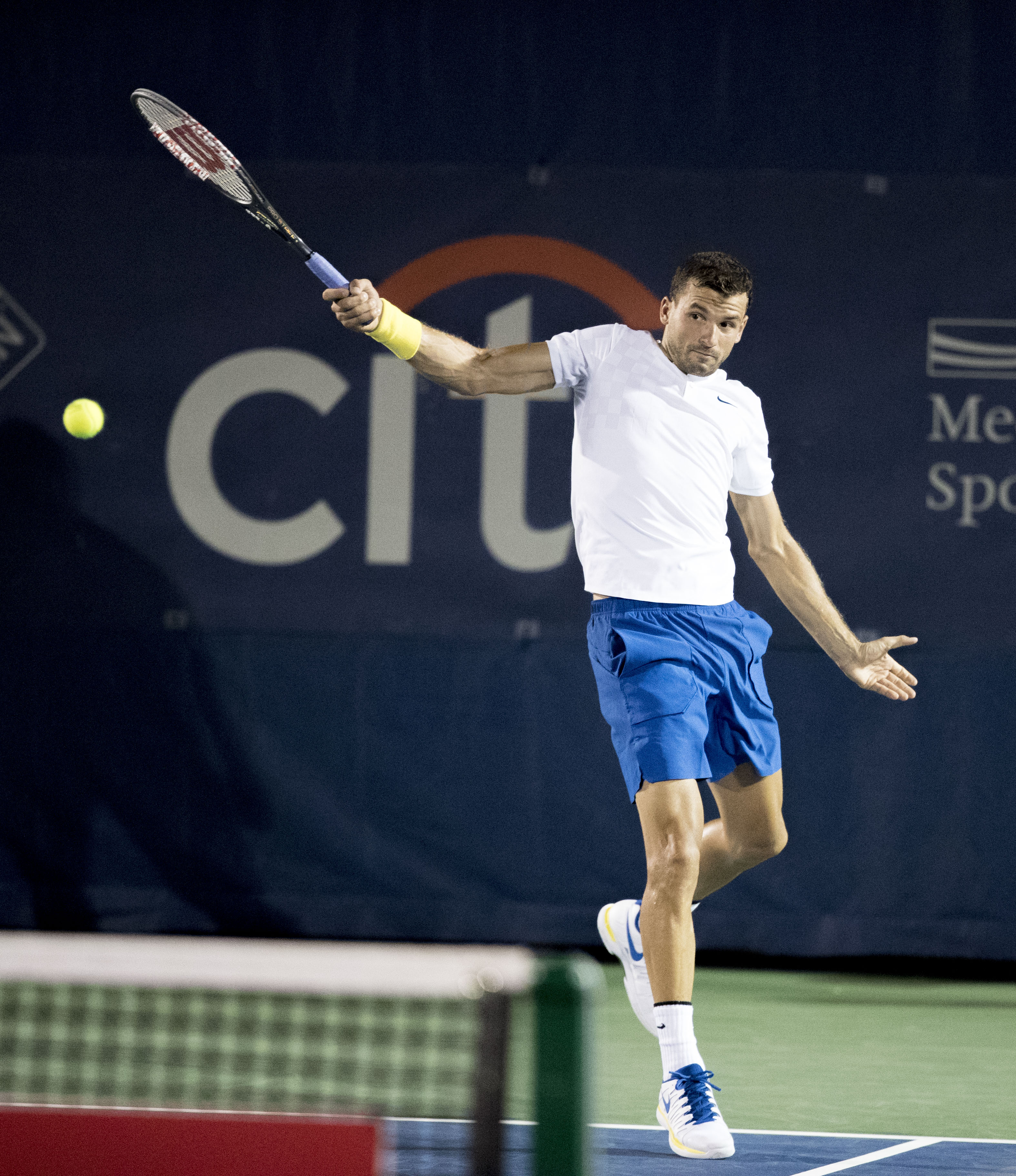
Grigor Dimitrov won the 2017 ATP Finals as undefeated champion, becoming the first debutant to win the season-ending championship since Àlex Corretja in 1998. Dimitrov ended the season at a career-high world No. 3 (only behind Nadal and Federer).

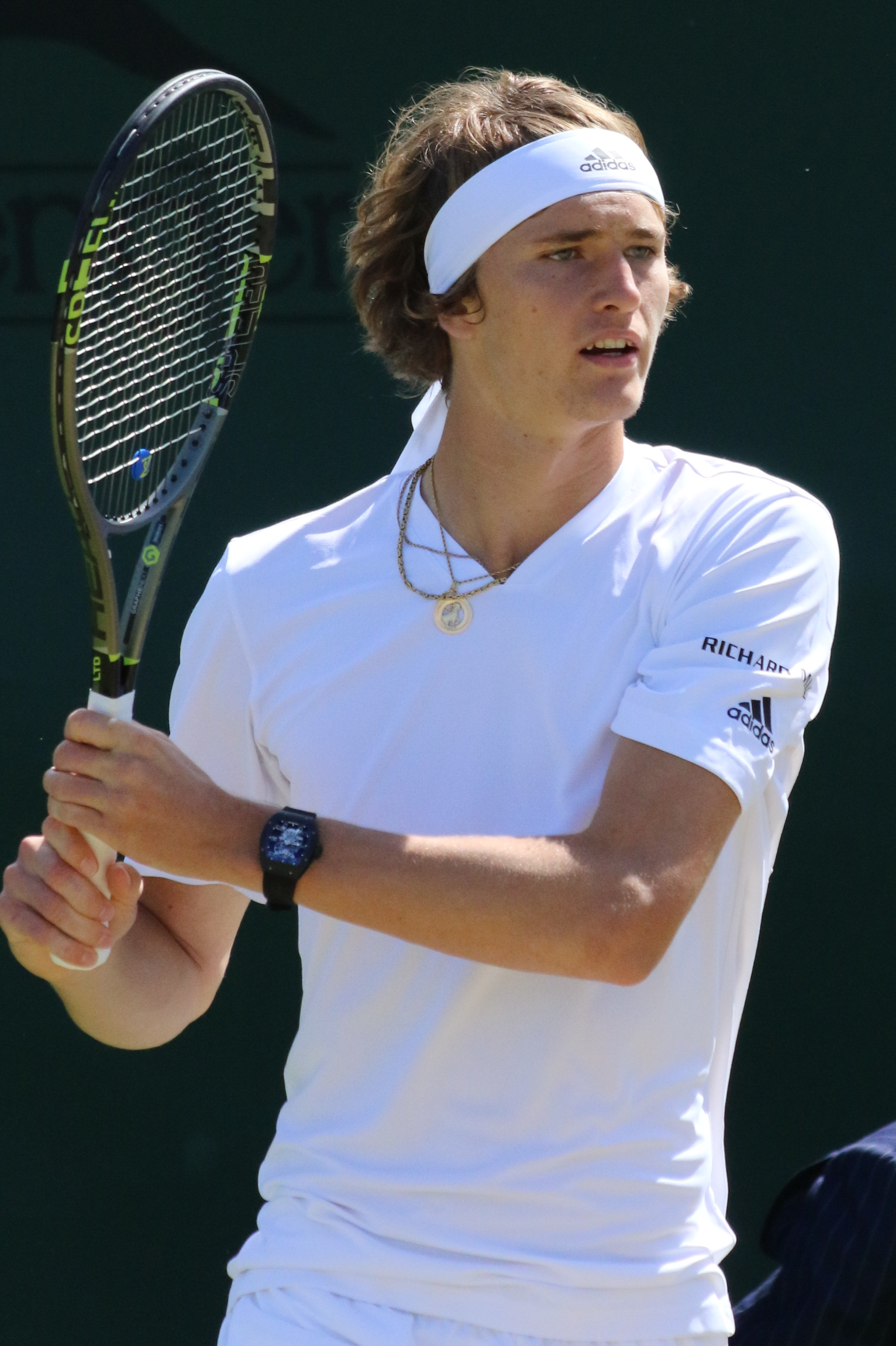
After becoming the first player born in the 1990s to win a Masters title (in Rome, def. Djokovic), Alexander Zverev entered the Top Ten at No. 10 on 22 May.

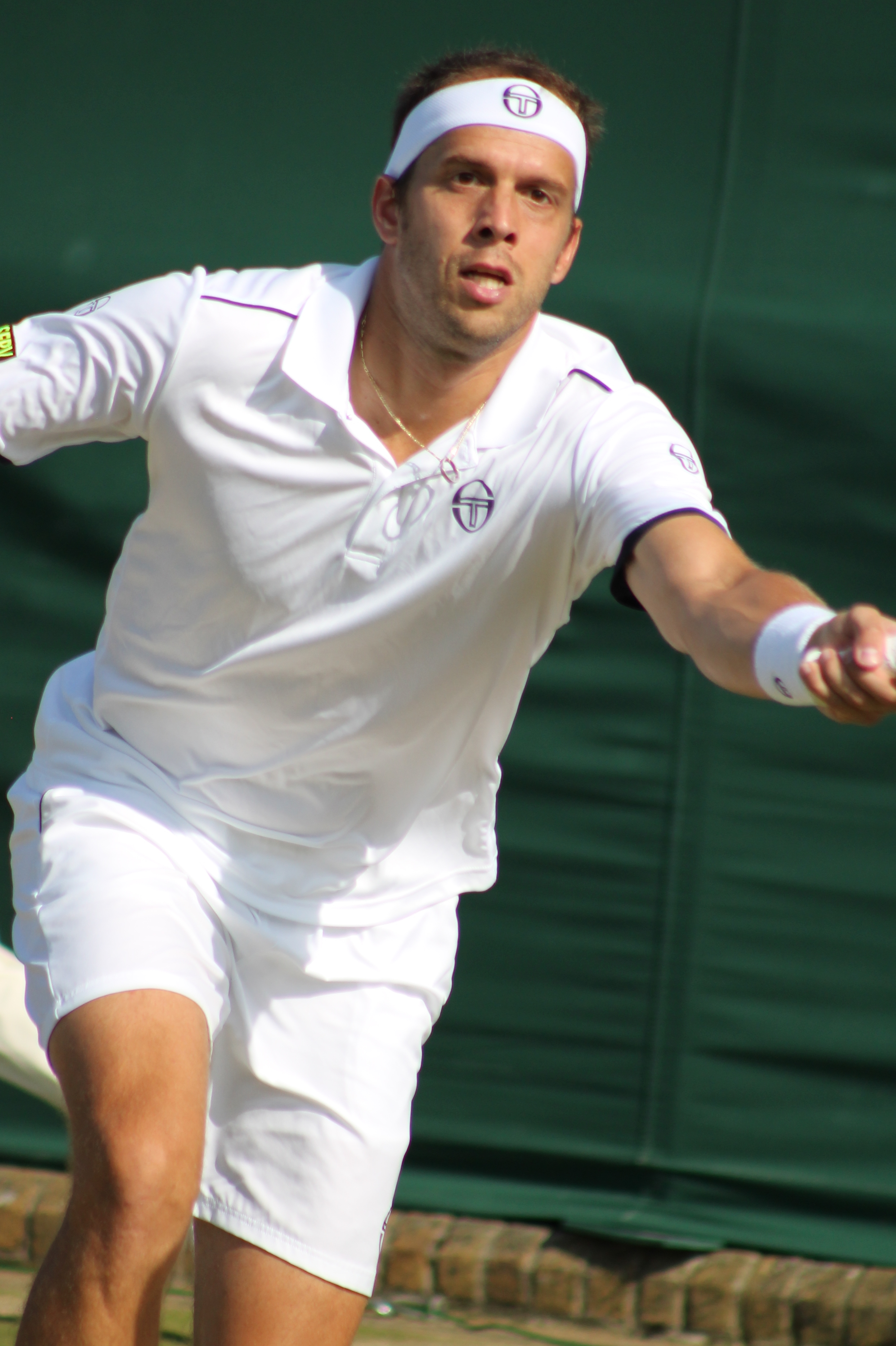
34-year-old Gilles Müller won his first two titles in Sydney (def. Evans) and Rosmalen (def. Karlović) after 16 years on the circuit.

The following players won their first main circuit title in singles, doubles or mixed doubles:

Singles

- (Luxembourg) Gilles Müller – Sydney (draw)
- (United States) Ryan Harrison – Memphis (draw)
- (Croatia) Borna Ćorić – Marrakesh (draw)
- (Japan) Yūichi Sugita – Antalya (draw)
- (Russia) Andrey Rublev – Umag (draw)
- (Germany) Peter Gojowczyk – Metz (draw)
- (Bosnia and Herzegovina) Damir Džumhur – St. Petersburg (draw)

Doubles

- (Australia) Thanasi Kokkinakis – Brisbane (draw)
- (Australia) Jordan Thompson – Brisbane (draw)
- (India) Jeevan Nedunchezhiyan – Chennai (draw)
- (Germany) Alexander Zverev – Montpellier (draw)
- (United States) Brian Baker – Memphis (draw)
- (Croatia) Nikola Mektić – Memphis (draw)
- (Brazil) Rogério Dutra Silva – São Paulo (draw)
- (Czech Republic) Roman Jebavý – Istanbul (draw)
- (Japan) Ben McLachlan – Tokyo (draw)
- (Japan) Yasutaka Uchiyama – Tokyo (draw)

Mixed doubles

- (Colombia) Juan Sebastián Cabal – Australian Open (draw)
- (India) Rohan Bopanna – French Open (draw)

The following players defended a main circuit title in singles, doubles, or mixed doubles:

Singles

- (Serbia) Novak Djokovic – Doha (draw)
- (Dominican Republic) Víctor Estrella Burgos – Quito (draw)
- (Uruguay) Pablo Cuevas – São Paulo (draw)
- (Spain) Rafael Nadal – Monte Carlo (draw), Barcelona (draw)
- (Switzerland) Stan Wawrinka – Geneva (draw)
- (Argentina) Juan Martín del Potro – Stockholm (draw)

Doubles

- (Colombia) Juan Sebastián Cabal – Buenos Aires (draw)
- (Colombia) Robert Farah – Buenos Aires (draw)
- (Finland) Henri Kontinen – ATP Finals (draw)
- (Australia) John Peers – ATP Finals (draw)

=== Top Ten entry ===
The following players entered the Top Ten for the first time in their careers:

Singles

- (Belgium) David Goffin (entered at No. 10 on 20 February)
- (Germany) Alexander Zverev (entered at No. 10 on 22 May)
- (Spain) Pablo Carreño Busta (entered at No. 10 on 11 September)
- (United States) Jack Sock (entered at No. 9 on 6 November)

== ATP rankings ==
These are the ATP rankings and yearly ATP Race rankings of the top 20 singles players, doubles players and doubles teams at the end of the 2017 season.

=== Singles ===
Singles race rankings final rankings
#	Player	Points	Tours
1	Rafael Nadal (ESP)	10,645	17
2	Roger Federer (SUI)	9,005	11
3	Alexander Zverev (GER)	4,410	24
4	Dominic Thiem (AUT)	3,815	26
5	Marin Čilić (CRO)	3,805	21
6	Grigor Dimitrov (BUL)	3,650	22
7	Stan Wawrinka (SUI)	3,150	15
8	David Goffin (BEL)	2,975	25
9	Jack Sock (USA)	2,765	21
10	Pablo Carreño Busta (ESP)	2,615	24
11	Juan Martín del Potro (ARG)	2,595	19
12	Novak Djokovic (SRB)	2,585	16
13	Sam Querrey (USA)	2,535	23
14	Kevin Anderson (RSA)	2,480	22
15	Jo-Wilfried Tsonga (FRA)	2,320	20
16	Andy Murray (GBR)	2,290	16
17	John Isner (USA)	2,265	24
18	Lucas Pouille (FRA)	2,235	24
19	Tomáš Berdych (CZE)	2,095	20
20	Roberto Bautista Agut (ESP)	2,015	24

Player competed at the 2017 ATP Finals
Player qualified for but did not compete at the 2017 ATP Finals

Year-end rankings 2017 (25 December 2017)
#	Player	Points	#Trn	'16 Rk	High	Low	'16→'17
1	Rafael Nadal (ESP)	10,645	18	9	1	9	▲8
2	Roger Federer (SUI)	9,605	12	16	2	17	▲14
3	Grigor Dimitrov (BUL)	5,150	23	17	3	17	▲14
4	Alexander Zverev (GER)	4,610	25	24	3	24	▲20
5	Dominic Thiem (AUT)	4,015	27	8	4	9	▲3
6	Marin Čilić (CRO)	3,805	27	6	4	9	Steady
7	David Goffin (BEL)	3,775	26	11	7	14	▲7
8	Jack Sock (USA)	3,165	22	23	8	23	▲15
9	Stan Wawrinka (SUI)	3,150	15	4	3	9	▼5
10	Pablo Carreño Busta (ESP)	2,615	25	30	10	31	▲20
11	Juan Martín del Potro (ARG)	2,595	19	38	11	42	▲27
12	Novak Djokovic (SRB)	2,585	16	2	2	12	▼10
13	Sam Querrey (USA)	2,535	23	31	13	40	▲18
14	Kevin Anderson (RSA)	2,480	22	67	14	80	▲53
15	Jo-Wilfried Tsonga (FRA)	2,320	20	12	7	18	▼3
16	Andy Murray (GBR)	2,290	16	1	1	16	▼15
17	John Isner (USA)	2,265	24	19	13	24	▲2
18	Lucas Pouille (FRA)	2,235	24	15	13	25	▼3
19	Tomáš Berdych (CZE)	2,095	19	10	10	20	▼9
20	Roberto Bautista Agut (ESP)	2,015	24	14	13	23	▼6

==== No. 1 ranking ====
Holder	Date gained	Date forfeited
Andy Murray (GBR)	Year end 2016	20 August 2017
Rafael Nadal (ESP)	21 August 2017	Year end 2017

=== Doubles ===
Doubles team race rankings final rankings
#	Team	Points	Tours
1	Łukasz Kubot (POL); Marcelo Melo (BRA)	8,600	22
2	Henri Kontinen (FIN); John Peers (AUS)	7,330	20
3	Jean-Julien Rojer (NED); Horia Tecău (ROU)	5,295	26
4	Jamie Murray (GBR); Bruno Soares (BRA)	5,180	23
5	Bob Bryan (USA); Mike Bryan (USA)	4,625	20
6	Pierre-Hugues Herbert (FRA); Nicolas Mahut (FRA)	4,395	15
7	Ivan Dodig (CRO); Marcel Granollers (ESP)	4,090	17
8	Ryan Harrison (USA); Michael Venus (NZL)	3,150	15
9	Oliver Marach (AUT); Mate Pavić (CRO)	3,100	18
10	Raven Klaasen (RSA); Rajeev Ram (USA)	3,020	22

Team competed at the 2017 ATP Finals

| class="col-break " style=" padding-left: 2em;" |

Year-end rankings 2017 (25 December 2017)
#	Player	Points	#Trn	16' Rank	High	Low	'16→'17
1	Marcelo Melo (BRA)	9,220	24	8	1	9	▲7
2	Łukasz Kubot (POL)	9,220	25	24	2	24	▲22
3	Henri Kontinen (FIN)	8,540	21	7	1	7	▲4
4	John Peers (AUS)	8,540	22	9	2	9	▲5
5	Ivan Dodig (CRO)	5,550	25	13	5	14	▲8
6	Nicolas Mahut (FRA)	5,535	19	1	1	10	▼5
7	Jean-Julien Rojer (NED)	5,130	28	27	7	29	▲20
8	Horia Tecău (ROU)	5,070	27	19	8	28	▲11
9	Jamie Murray (GBR)	4,980	24	4	4	11	▼5
10	Bruno Soares (BRA)	4,980	25	3	3	12	▼7
11	Bob Bryan (USA)	4,690	21	5T	3	11	▼6
11	Mike Bryan (USA)	4,690	21	5T	3	11	▼6
13	Pierre-Hugues Herbert (FRA)	4,685	16	2	2	13	▼11
14	Marcel Granollers (ESP)	4,365	23	18	11	20	▲4
15	Michael Venus (NZL)	4,065	35	32	12	42	▲17
16	Ryan Harrison (USA)	3,900	20	238	16	238	▲222
17	Mate Pavić (CRO)	3,870	33	29	15	38	▲12
18	Rohan Bopanna (IND)	3,790	26	28	16	28	▲10
19	Oliver Marach (AUT)	3,730	28	33	17	39	▲14
20	Marc López (ESP)	3,375	26	10	10	28	▼10

==== No. 1 ranking ====
Holder	Date gained	Date forfeited
Nicolas Mahut (FRA)	Year end 2016	2 April 2017
Henri Kontinen (FIN)	3 April 2017	16 July 2017
Marcelo Melo (BRA)	17 July 2017	20 August 2017
Henri Kontinen (FIN)	21 August 2017	5 November 2017
Marcelo Melo (BRA)	6 November 2017	Year end 2017

== Prize money leaders ==
#	Player	Singles	Doubles	Year-to-date
1	(Spain) Rafael Nadal	$15,851,340	$12,660	$15,864,000
2	(Switzerland) Roger Federer	$13,054,856	$0	$13,054,856
3	(Bulgaria) Grigor Dimitrov	$6,575,244	$33,266	$6,608,510
4	(Germany) Alexander Zverev	$5,006,313	$102,685	$5,108,998
5	(Austria) Dominic Thiem	$4,283,907	$61,719	$4,345,626
6	(Croatia) Marin Čilić	$4,004,923	$58,815	$4,063,738
7	(Belgium) David Goffin	$3,890,613	$14,063	$3,904,676
8	(United States) Jack Sock	$3,149,419	$257,154	$3,406,573
9	(Switzerland) Stan Wawrinka	$3,083,829	$16,683	$3,100,512
10	(Spain) Pablo Carreño Busta	$2,843,305	$166,054	$3,009,359
Prize money given in US$; as of December 4, 2017

== Best matches by ATPWorldTour.com ==
=== Best 5 Grand Slam matches ===
	Event	Round	Surface	Winner	Opponent	Result
1.	Australian Open	F	Hard	(Switzerland) Roger Federer	(Spain) Rafael Nadal	6–4, 3–6, 6–1, 3–6, 6–3
2.	US Open	R4	Hard	(Argentina) Juan Martín del Potro	(Austria) Dominic Thiem	1–6, 2–6, 6–1, 7–6^{(7–1)}, 6–4
3.	Australian Open	SF	Hard	(Spain) Rafael Nadal	(Bulgaria) Grigor Dimitrov	6–3, 5–7, 7–6^{(7–5)}, 6–7^{(4–7)}, 6–4
4.	Wimbledon	R4	Grass	(Luxembourg) Gilles Müller	(Spain) Rafael Nadal	6–3, 6–4, 3–6, 4–6, 15–13
5.	French Open	SF	Clay	(Switzerland) Stan Wawrinka	(United Kingdom) Andy Murray	6–7^{(6–8)}, 6–3, 5–7, 7–6^{(7–3)}, 6–1

=== Best 5 ATP World Tour matches ===
	Event	Round	Surface	Winner	Opponent	Result
1.	Miami Open	SF	Hard	(Switzerland) Roger Federer	(Australia) Nick Kyrgios	7–6^{(11–9)}, 6–7^{(9–11)}, 7–6^{(7–5)}
2.	Madrid Open	R3	Clay	(Austria) Dominic Thiem	(Bulgaria) Grigor Dimitrov	4–6, 6–4, 7–6^{(11–9)}
3.	Canadian Open	R2	Hard	(France) Gaël Monfils	(Japan) Kei Nishikori	6–7^{(4–7)}, 7–5, 7–6^{(8–6)}
4.	Qatar Open	F	Hard	(Serbia) Novak Djokovic	(United Kingdom) Andy Murray	6–3, 5–7, 6–4
5.	China Open	R1	Hard	(Spain) Rafael Nadal	(France) Lucas Pouille	4–6, 7–6^{(8–6)}, 7–5

== Point distribution ==
Category	W	F	SF	QF	R16	R32	R64	R128	Q	Q3	Q2	Q1
Grand Slam (128S)	2000	1200	720	360	180	90	45	10	25	16	8	0
Grand Slam (64D)	2000	1200	720	360	180	90	0	–	25	–	0	0
ATP Finals (8S/8D)	1500 (max) 1100 (min)	1000 (max) 600 (min)	600 (max); 200 (min)	200 for each round robin match win, +400 for a semi-final win, +500 for the final win.								
ATP World Tour Masters 1000 (96S)	1000	600	360	180	90	45	25	10	16	–	8	0
ATP World Tour Masters 1000 (56S/48S)	1000	600	360	180	90	45	10	–	25	–	16	0
ATP World Tour Masters 1000 (32D/24D)	1000	600	360	180	90	0	–	–	–	–	–	–
ATP World Tour 500 (48S)	500	300	180	90	45	20	0	–	10	–	4	0
ATP World Tour 500 (32S)	500	300	180	90	45	0	–	–	20	–	10	0
ATP World Tour 500 (16D)	500	300	180	90	0	–	–	–	45	–	25	0
ATP World Tour 250 (48S)	250	150	90	45	20	10	0	–	5	–	3	0
ATP World Tour 250 (32S/28S)	250	150	90	45	20	0	–	–	12	–	6	0
ATP World Tour 250 (16D)	250	150	90	45	0	–	–	–	–	–	–	–

== Retirements ==
- Martín Alund (born 26 December 1985, in Mendoza, Argentina) joined the professional tour in 2004, and reached his career-high singles ranking of no. 84 in 2013. Alund played mostly on the secondary ATP Challenger Tour and the ITF Men's Circuit, retiring in January after a year of injury.
- Benjamin Becker (born 16 June 1981, in Merzig, Germany) joined the professional tour in 2004, and reached his career-high singles ranking of no. 35 in 2014. Becker won one singles title in 2009 in Ordina Open in 's-Hertogenbosch and recorded six top 10 wins in his career. He is also known for being the last player to play and beat Andre Agassi in the latter's final US Open in 2006 in the third round. Becker announced his retirement and intent to return to studies at Baylor University in September 2017.
- Marco Chiudinelli (born 10 September 1981, in Basel, Switzerland) joined the professional tour in 2000, and reached a career-high singles of no. 52. In 2009, he won the Allianz Suisse Open Gstaad doubles title with partner Michael Lammer and later became a Davis Cup Champion in 2014. He announced his retirement after the conclusion of Swiss Indoors where, also in 2009, he managed to reach the semi-finals in singles.
- Somdev Devvarman (born 13 February 1985, in Agartala, India) joined the professional tour in 2008, and reached a career-high singles ranking of no. 62 in 2011. Studying in the United States, Devvarman won two consecutive NCAA Men's Tennis Championships (2007–08), collecting an unprecedented win–loss record of 44–1 in 2008. He made two ATP finals, but found his largest success outside the main tour, clinching gold medals at the Commonwealth Games and Asian Games in 2010. He announced his retirement in January after not playing for a year.
- Colin Fleming (born 13 August 1984, in Broxburn, United Kingdom) joined the professional tour in 2003 and reached a career-high doubles ranking of world no. 17, winning a Commonwealth Games gold medal in mixed doubles in 2010. He announced his retirement on 16 January 2017.
- Mariusz Fyrstenberg (born 8 July 1980, in Warsaw, Poland) joined the professional tour in 2001, won eighteen doubles titles and reached a career-high doubles ranking of world no. 6 in 2012. He was runner-up at the 2011 US Open and 2011 ATP World Tour Finals, alongside fellow Pole Marcin Matkowski. He announced his retirement after the finish of the Pekao Szczecin Open.
- Giovanni Lapentti (born 25 January 1983, in Guayaquil, Ecuador) joined the professional tour in 2002 and reached a career-high singles ranking of no. 110 in 2005. He never won any singles and doubles titles in ATP tournaments, having played mostly on the ATP Challenger Tour. He announced that he would retire after the Ecuador Open.
- (Croatia) Dino Marcan (born 12 February 1991, in Rijeka, Yugoslavia) joined the professional tour in 2008 and reached career-high rankings of No. 87 in doubles in May 2017. Marcan announced he had retired in this season.
- Paul-Henri Mathieu (born 12 January 1982, in Strasbourg, France) joined the professional tour in 1999 and reached a career-high singles ranking of no. 12. In 2002, Mathieu won his first two ATP Tour titles in back-to-back weeks. Mathieu won in Moscow, beating world no. 4 Marat Safin in the semi-finals en route, before he then headed to Lyon, where he beat Brazilian Gustavo Kuerten for the title. By the end of his career, he would have 4 career titles to his name. He announced his retirement after his singles qualifying match at the 2017 Rolex Paris Masters.
- Juan Mónaco (born 29 March 1984, in Tandil, Argentina) joined the professional tour in 2002, won nine ATP titles, reaching his career-high singles ranking of no. 10 in 2012 as well as also becoming a Davis Cup Champion in 2016. He announced his retirement in May.
- Albert Montañés (born 26 November 1980, in Sant Carles de la Ràpita, Spain) joined the professional tour in 1999, won six ATP 250 titles, and had a career-high singles ranking of 22, achieved in 2010. He announced that the Barcelona Open would be his final tournament.
- Rubén Ramírez Hidalgo (born 6 January 1978 in Alicante, Spain) joined the professional tour in 1998 and reached a career-high of no. 50 in singles. He retired from professional tennis after the end of the 2017 season.
- Radek Štěpánek (born 27 November 1978, in Karviná, Czechoslovakia) joined the professional tour in 1996 and reached a career-high singles ranking of no. 8 and a career-high doubles ranking of no. 4. He won 5 singles titles and 18 doubles titles, including the 2012 Australian Open and 2013 US Open doubles titles with Leander Paes. Along with Lucie Hradecká, he also won the bronze medal at the 2016 Olympic Games in the mixed doubles event as well, having previously won consecutive Davis Cups with the Czech Republic in 2012 and 2013. He announced his retirement due to an injury in November of this year.
- (Russia) Dmitry Tursunov (born 12 December 1982, in Moscow, Soviet Union) joined the professional tour in 2000 and reached a career-high singles ranking of no. 20. He won 7 singles titles.
- Grega Žemlja (born 29 September 1986, in Kranj, Slovenia) joined the professional tour in 2009 and reached a career-high singles ranking of no. 43 in 2013. He was runner-up at the 2012 Erste Bank Open. He announced that the Tilia Slovenia Open would be his final tournament.

== Comebacks ==
Following is a list of notable players (winners of a main tour title, and/or part of the ATP rankings top 100 [singles] or top 50 [doubles] for at least one week) who returned from retirement, announced their retirement from professional tennis, became inactive (after not playing for more than 52 weeks), or were permanently banned from playing, during the 2017 season:

- Juan Carlos Ferrero (born 12 February 1980, in Ontinyent, Spain) joined the professional tour in 1998 and reached a career-high singles ranking of world no. 1 in 2003, also winning the French Open in that very same year. Initially retiring in 2012, Ferrero made a comeback at the Barcelona Open, partnering Pablo Carreño Busta in the doubles draw.
- Nicolás Lapentti (born 13 August 1976, in Guayaquil, Ecuador) joined the professional tour in 1995 and reached a career-high singles ranking of world no. 6. Initially retiring in 2011, Lapentti returned for the final event of his brother Giovanni's career, partnering him in the doubles draw.

== See also ==
- 2017 WTA Tour
- 2017 ATP Challenger Tour
- Association of Tennis Professionals
- International Tennis Federation
