= 2017 Brasil Open =

- Date: February 27 – March 6
- Edition: 17th
- Category: ATP World Tour 250
- Draw: 28S / 16D
- Prize money: $455,565
- Surface: Clay - indoor
- Location: São Paulo, Brazil
- Venue: Esporte Clube Pinheiros

Champions

Singles
- (Uruguay) Pablo Cuevas

Doubles
- (Brazil) Rogério Dutra Silva / (Brazil) André Sá
- Brasil Open

The 2017 Brasil Open was a tennis tournament played on outdoor clay courts. It was the 17th edition of the Brasil Open, and part of the ATP World Tour 250 series of the 2017 ATP World Tour. It took place from February 27 through March 6, 2017, at the Esporte Clube Pinheiros in São Paulo, Brazil, with the final completed on a Monday due to rain. Third-seeded Pablo Cuevas won the singles title.

== Finals ==
=== Singles ===
- (Uruguay) Pablo Cuevas defeated (Spain) Albert Ramos Viñolas, 6–7^{(3–7)}, 6–4, 6–4

=== Doubles ===
- (Brazil) Rogério Dutra Silva / (Brazil) André Sá defeated (New Zealand) Marcus Daniell / (Brazil) Marcelo Demoliner, 7–6^{(7–5)}, 5–7, [10–7]

== Singles main-draw entrants ==
=== Seeds ===
Country	Player	Ranking^{1}	Seed
ESP	Pablo Carreño Busta	24	1
ESP	Albert Ramos Viñolas	25	2
URU	Pablo Cuevas	30	3
POR	João Sousa	39	4
ITA	Fabio Fognini	45	5
ARG	Diego Schwartzman	51	6
ARG	Federico Delbonis	52	7
ARG	Carlos Berlocq	66	8

- ^{1} Rankings as of February 20, 2017.

=== Other entrants ===
The following players received wildcards into the main draw:

- (Brazil) Orlando Luz
- (Japan) Akira Santillan
- (Brazil) João Souza

The following player received entry as a special exempt:

- (Norway) Casper Ruud

The following players received entry from the qualifying draw:

- (Italy) Marco Cecchinato
- (Brazil) Guilherme Clezar
- (Italy) Alessandro Giannessi
- (Slovakia) Jozef Kovalík

== Doubles main-draw entrants ==
=== Seeds ===
Country	Player	Country	Player	Rank^{1}	Seed
ESP	Pablo Carreño Busta	URU	Pablo Cuevas	60	1
CHI	Julio Peralta	ARG	Horacio Zeballos	90	2
USA	Nicholas Monroe	NZL	Artem Sitak	103	3
NZL	Marcus Daniell	BRA	Marcelo Demoliner	113	4

- ^{1} Rankings are as of February 20, 2017.

=== Other entrants ===
The following pairs received wildcards into the main draw:

- (Serbia) Dušan Lajović / (Brazil) Eduardo Russi Assumpção
- (Brazil) Fabrício Neis / (Brazil) João Souza

The following pair received entry as alternates:

- (Spain) Íñigo Cervantes / (Japan) Taro Daniel

=== Withdrawals ===
Before the tournament

- (Brazil) Thomaz Bellucci
