= 2017 Rakuten Japan Open Tennis Championships =

- Date: 2–8 October
- Edition: 44th
- Category: ATP World Tour 500
- Draw: 32S/16D
- Surface: Hard / outdoor
- Location: Tokyo, Japan

Champions

Singles
- (Belgium) David Goffin

Doubles
- (Japan) Ben McLachlan / (Japan) Yasutaka Uchiyama
- Japan Open

The 2017 Rakuten Japan Open Tennis Championships was a men's tennis tournament played on outdoor hard courts. It was the 44th edition of the Japan Open, and part of the 500 Series of the 2017 ATP World Tour. It was held at the Ariake Coliseum in Tokyo, Japan, from 2 October until 8 October 2017. Fourth-seeded David Goffin won the singles title.

== Finals ==
=== Singles ===
- (Belgium) David Goffin defeated (France) Adrian Mannarino, 6–3, 7–5

=== Doubles ===
- (Japan) Ben McLachlan / (Japan) Yasutaka Uchiyama defeated (United Kingdom) Jamie Murray / (Brazil) Bruno Soares, 6–4, 7–6^{(7–1)}

== Points and prize money ==
=== Point distribution ===
Event	W	F	SF	QF	Round of 16	Round of 32	Q	Q2	Q1
Singles	500	300	180	90	45	0	20	10	0
Doubles	500	300	180	90	0	—N/a	—N/a	—N/a	—N/a

=== Prize money ===
Event	W	F	SF	QF	Round of 16	Round of 32	Q2	Q1
Singles	$336,900	$165,170	$83,110	$42,265	$21,950	$11,575	$2,560	$1,310
Doubles	$101,440	$49,660	$24,910	$12,785	$6,610	—N/a	—N/a	—N/a

== Singles main-draw entrants ==
=== Seeds ===
Country	Player	Rank^{1}	Seed
CRO	Marin Čilić	5	1
AUT	Dominic Thiem	7	2
CAN	Milos Raonic	11	3
BEL	David Goffin	12	4
RSA	Kevin Anderson	15	5
USA	Sam Querrey	16	6
ESP	Albert Ramos Viñolas	25	7
ARG	Diego Schwartzman	29	8

- ^{1} Rankings are as of September 25, 2017.

=== Other entrants ===
The following players received wildcards into the singles main draw:

- (Japan) Taro Daniel
- (Japan) Go Soeda
- (Japan) Yasutaka Uchiyama

The following player received entry as a special exempt:

- (Ukraine) Alexandr Dolgopolov

The following players received entry from the qualifying draw:

- (Australia) Matthew Ebden
- (Croatia) Franko Škugor
- (Japan) Yusuke Takahashi
- (Greece) Stefanos Tsitsipas

=== Withdrawals ===
Before the tournament

- (South Korea) Chung Hyeon →replaced by (United States) Donald Young
- (France) Gaël Monfils →replaced by (Czech Republic) Jiří Veselý
- (Luxembourg) Gilles Müller →replaced by (Russia) Daniil Medvedev

=== Retirements ===
- (Canada) Milos Raonic
- (France) Benoît Paire

== Doubles main-draw entrants ==
=== Seeds ===
Country	Player	Country	Player	Rank^{1}	Seed
NED	Jean-Julien Rojer	ROU	Horia Tecău	19	1
GBR	Jamie Murray	BRA	Bruno Soares	23	2
RSA	Raven Klaasen	USA	Rajeev Ram	33	3
USA	Ryan Harrison	NZL	Michael Venus	40	4

- Rankings are as of September 25, 2017

=== Other entrants ===
The following pairs received wildcards into the doubles main draw:

- (Japan) Toshihide Matsui / (Japan) Yūichi Sugita
- (Japan) Ben McLachlan / (Japan) Yasutaka Uchiyama

The following pair received entry from the qualifying draw:

- (Philippines) Treat Huey / (Canada) Adil Shamasdin
