= 2017 Barcelona Open Banco Sabadell – Doubles =

Doubles
- 2017 Barcelona Open Banco Sabadell

Final
- Champions: (Romania) Florin Mergea (Pakistan) Aisam-ul-Haq Qureshi
- Runners-up: (Germany) Philipp Petzschner (Austria) Alexander Peya
- Score: 6–4, 6–3

Events
Singles	Doubles
← 2016 ·	Barcelona Open	· 2018 →

Bob and Mike Bryan were the defending champions, but chose not to participate this year.

Florin Mergea and Aisam-ul-Haq Qureshi won the title, defeating Philipp Petzschner and Alexander Peya in the final, 6–4, 6–3.

== Seeds ==
1. (Finland) Henri Kontinen / (Australia) John Peers (quarterfinals)
2. (United Kingdom) Jamie Murray / (Brazil) Bruno Soares (first round)
3. (Croatia) Ivan Dodig / (Spain) Marcel Granollers (first round)
4. (Spain) Feliciano López / (Spain) Marc López (first round)

== Draw ==
Key

- Q = Qualifier
- WC = Wild card
- LL = Lucky loser
- Alt = Alternate
- ITF = ITF entry
- PR = Protected ranking
- SR = Special ranking
- SE = Special exempt
- JE = Junior exempt
- JR = Junior Accelerator Programme entrant
- CO = College Accelerator Programme entrant
- NG = Next Gen Accelerator Program entrant
- w/o = Walkover
- r = Retired
- d = Defaulted

=== Draw ===
First round
1	(Finland) H Kontinen (Australia) J Peers	7^{7}	7^{7}
(India) R Bopanna (Uruguay) P Cuevas	6^{3}	6^{2}
Q	(New Zealand) M Daniell (Brazil) M Demoliner	4	4
(Romania) F Mergea (Pakistan) A-u-H Qureshi	6	6
4	(Spain) F López (Spain) M López	7	4	[6]
(Poland) Ł Kubot (Germany) M Zverev	5	6	[10]
WC	(Spain) J Munar (Spain) A Ramos Viñolas	4	2
(Netherlands) J-J Rojer (Romania) H Tecău	6	6
PR	(Germany) P Petzschner (Austria) A Peya	6	6
(Russia) K Khachanov (Austria) D Thiem	3	3
(Belgium) D Goffin (France) P-H Herbert	3	7^{7}	[10]
3	(Croatia) I Dodig (Spain) M Granollers	6	6^{2}	[7]
WC	(Spain) P Carreño Busta (Spain) JC Ferrero	2	7	[7]
(Poland) M Matkowski (Canada) D Nestor	6	5	[10]
(France) F Martin (France) É Roger-Vasselin	7^{7}	2	[10]
2	(United Kingdom) J Murray (Brazil) B Soares	6^{5}	6	[3]

Quarterfinals
1	(Finland) H Kontinen (Australia) J Peers	4	4
(Romania) F Mergea (Pakistan) A-u-H Qureshi	6	6
(Poland) Ł Kubot (Germany) M Zverev	3	4
(Netherlands) J-J Rojer (Romania) H Tecău	6	6
PR	(Germany) P Petzschner (Austria) A Peya	6	4	[10]
(Belgium) D Goffin (France) P-H Herbert	3	6	[7]
(Poland) M Matkowski (Canada) D Nestor	3	6^{4}
(France) F Martin (France) É Roger-Vasselin	6	7^{7}

Semifinals
(Romania) F Mergea (Pakistan) A-u-H Qureshi	6	5	[14]
(Netherlands) J-J Rojer (Romania) H Tecău	3	7	[12]
PR	(Germany) P Petzschner (Austria) A Peya	6	6
(France) F Martin (France) É Roger-Vasselin	1	1

Final
(Romania) F Mergea (Pakistan) A-u-H Qureshi	6	6
PR	(Germany) P Petzschner (Austria) A Peya	4	3

== Qualifying ==
=== Seeds ===
1. (New Zealand) Marcus Daniell / (Brazil) Marcelo Demoliner (qualified)
2. (India) Purav Raja / (India) Divij Sharan (first round)

=== Qualifiers ===
1. (New Zealand) Marcus Daniell / (Brazil) Marcelo Demoliner

=== Qualifying draw ===
First round
1	(New Zealand) Marcus Daniell (Brazil) Marcelo Demoliner	7^{7}	6
WC	(Spain) Roberto Carballés Baena (Spain) Íñigo Cervantes	6^{3}	4
(South Africa) Kevin Anderson (Brazil) André Sá	6	6
2	(India) Purav Raja (India) Divij Sharan	4	4

Qualifying competition
1	(New Zealand) Marcus Daniell (Brazil) Marcelo Demoliner	3	7	[10]
(South Africa) Kevin Anderson (Brazil) André Sá	6	5	[5]
