= 2017 Brasil Open – Singles =

Singles
- 2017 Brasil Open

Final
- Champion: (Uruguay) Pablo Cuevas
- Runner-up: (Spain) Albert Ramos Viñolas
- Score: 6–7^{(3–7)}, 6–4, 6–4

Details
- Draw: 28 (4 Q / 3 WC )
- Seeds: 8

Events
Singles	Doubles
- Brasil Open

Pablo Cuevas was the two-time defending champion and successfully defended his title, defeating Albert Ramos Viñolas in the final, 6–7^{(3–7)}, 6–4, 6–4.

== Seeds ==
The top four seeds receive a bye into the second round.

1. (Spain) Pablo Carreño Busta (semifinals)
2. (Spain) Albert Ramos Viñolas (final)
3. (Uruguay) Pablo Cuevas (champion)
4. (Portugal) João Sousa (semifinals)
5. (Italy) Fabio Fognini (quarterfinals)
6. (Argentina) Diego Schwartzman (quarterfinals)
7. (Argentina) Federico Delbonis (quarterfinals)
8. (Argentina) Carlos Berlocq (second round)

== Draw ==
Key

- Q = Qualifier
- WC = Wild card
- LL = Lucky loser
- Alt = Alternate
- ITF = ITF entry
- PR = Protected ranking
- SR = Special ranking
- SE = Special exempt
- JE = Junior exempt
- JR = Junior Accelerator Programme entrant
- CO = College Accelerator Programme entrant
- NG = Next Gen Accelerator Program entrant
- w/o = Walkover
- r = Retired
- d = Defaulted

=== Finals ===
Semifinals
1	(Spain) Pablo Carreño Busta	3	6^{2}
3	(Uruguay) Pablo Cuevas	6	7^{7}
4	(Portugal) João Sousa	7^{7}	5	2
2	(Spain) Albert Ramos Viñolas	6^{5}	7	6

Final
3	(Uruguay) Pablo Cuevas	6^{3}	6	6
2	(Spain) Albert Ramos Viñolas	7^{7}	4	4

=== Top half ===
First round
(Argentina) H Zeballos	2	6^{3}
WC	(Brazil) J Souza	6	7^{7}
(Brazil) R Dutra Silva	4	3
Q	(Italy) A Giannessi	6	6
Q	(Italy) M Cecchinato	4	6^{4}
5	(Italy) F Fognini	6	7^{7}
(Argentina) F Bagnis	6	7
(Serbia) D Lajović	2	5
(Austria) G Melzer	6	7^{7}
(Dominican Republic) V Estrella Burgos	2	6^{3}
(Brazil) T Bellucci	2	0
6	(Argentina) D Schwartzman	6	6

Second round
1	(Spain) P Carreño Busta	6	6
WC	(Brazil) J Souza	4	2
Q	(Italy) A Giannessi	6^{1}	6^{3}
5	(Italy) F Fognini	7^{7}	7^{7}
3	(Uruguay) P Cuevas	6	6
(Argentina) F Bagnis	2	2
(Austria) G Melzer	2	2
6	(Argentina) D Schwartzman	6	6

Quarterfinals
1	(Spain) P Carreño Busta	6	7^{7}
5	(Italy) F Fognini	0	6^{1}
3	(Uruguay) P Cuevas	5	6	6
6	(Argentina) D Schwartzman	7	4	4

Semifinals
1	(Spain) P Carreño Busta	3	6^{2}
3	(Uruguay) P Cuevas	6	7^{7}

=== Bottom half ===
First round
7	(Argentina) F Delbonis	6	7^{7}
Q	(Slovakia) J Kovalík	4	6^{5}
WC	(Japan) A Santillan	4	4
SE	(Norway) C Ruud	6	6
(Spain) Í Cervantes	6^{6}	4
(Argentina) R Olivo	7^{8}	6
8	(Argentina) C Berlocq	4	6	6
(Brazil) T Monteiro	6	4	4
(Argentina) G Pella	6	6
Q	(Brazil) G Clezar	2	3
(Portugal) G Elias	6	7
WC	(Brazil) O Luz	2	5

Second round
7	(Argentina) F Delbonis	7	6
SE	(Norway) C Ruud	5	3
(Argentina) R Olivo	2	4
4	(Portugal) J Sousa	6	6
8	(Argentina) C Berlocq	5	3
(Argentina) G Pella	7	6
(Portugal) G Elias	4	6^{5}
2	(Spain) A Ramos Viñolas	6	7^{7}

Quarterfinals
7	(Argentina) F Delbonis	3	1
4	(Portugal) J Sousa	6	6
(Argentina) G Pella	4	6	4
2	(Spain) A Ramos Viñolas	6	3	6

Semifinals
4	(Portugal) J Sousa	7^{7}	5	2
2	(Spain) A Ramos Viñolas	6^{5}	7	6

== Qualifying ==
=== Seeds ===
1. (Slovakia) Jozef Kovalík (qualified)
2. (Japan) Taro Daniel (first round)
3. (Argentina) Nicolás Kicker (qualifying competition)
4. (Italy) Alessandro Giannessi (qualified)
5. (Spain) Roberto Carballés Baena (qualifying competition)
6. (Argentina) Guido Andreozzi (qualifying competition, retired)
7. (Belgium) Arthur De Greef (qualifying competition)
8. (Argentina) Leonardo Mayer (first round)

=== Qualifiers ===
1. (Slovakia) Jozef Kovalík
2. (Brazil) Guilherme Clezar
3. (Italy) Marco Cecchinato
4. (Italy) Alessandro Giannessi

=== Qualifying draw ===
==== First qualifier ====
First round
1	(Slovakia) Jozef Kovalík	6	6
Alt	(Brazil) João Pedro Sorgi	2	1
(Spain) Jordi Samper Montaña	2	2
5	(Spain) Roberto Carballés Baena	6	6

Qualifying competition
1	(Slovakia) Jozef Kovalík	6	1	6
5	(Spain) Roberto Carballés Baena	3	6	1

==== Second qualifier ====
First round
2	(Japan) Taro Daniel	5	2
WC	(Brazil) Guilherme Clezar	7	6
Alt	(Brazil) Caio Zampieri	2	4
7	(Belgium) Arthur De Greef	6	6

Qualifying competition
WC	(Brazil) Guilherme Clezar	7	6
7	(Belgium) Arthur De Greef	5	0

==== Third qualifier ====
First round
3	(Argentina) Nicolás Kicker	6	6
WC	(Brazil) Gustavo Teisen Pereira	0	0
(Italy) Marco Cecchinato	6	2	6
8	(Argentina) Leonardo Mayer	4	6	3

Qualifying competition
3	(Argentina) Nicolás Kicker	1	7	2
(Italy) Marco Cecchinato	6	5	6

==== Fourth qualifier ====
First round
4	(Italy) Alessandro Giannessi	6	0
Alt	(Argentina) Federico Coria	0	0^{r}
(Argentina) Máximo González	3	6^{5}
6	(Argentina) Guido Andreozzi	6	7^{7}

Qualifying competition
4	(Italy) Alessandro Giannessi	4	7^{7}	2
6	(Argentina) Guido Andreozzi	6	6^{5}	0^{r}
