= 2017 Rakuten Japan Open Tennis Championships – Doubles =

Doubles
- 2017 Rakuten Japan Open Tennis Championships

Final
- Champions: (Japan) Ben McLachlan (Japan) Yasutaka Uchiyama
- Runners-up: (United Kingdom) Jamie Murray (Brazil) Bruno Soares
- Score: 6–4, 7–6^{(7–1)}

Details
- Draw: 16 (1Q / 2WC)
- Seeds: 4

Events
Singles	Doubles
- Japan Open

Marcel Granollers and Marcin Matkowski were the defending champions, but Granollers chose to compete in Beijing instead. Matkowski played alongside Aisam-ul-Haq Qureshi, but lost in the first round to Santiago González and Julio Peralta.

Ben McLachlan and Yasutaka Uchiyama won the title, defeating Jamie Murray and Bruno Soares in the final, 6–4, 7–6^{(7–1)}.

== Seeds ==
1. (Netherlands) Jean-Julien Rojer / (Romania) Horia Tecău (quarterfinals)
2. (United Kingdom) Jamie Murray / (Brazil) Bruno Soares (final)
3. (South Africa) Raven Klaasen / (United States) Rajeev Ram (quarterfinals)
4. (United States) Ryan Harrison / (New Zealand) Michael Venus (first round)

== Draw ==
Key

- Q = Qualifier
- WC = Wild card
- LL = Lucky loser
- Alt = Alternate
- ITF = ITF entry
- PR = Protected ranking
- SR = Special ranking
- SE = Special exempt
- JE = Junior exempt
- JR = Junior Accelerator Programme entrant
- CO = College Accelerator Programme entrant
- NG = Next Gen Accelerator Program entrant
- w/o = Walkover
- r = Retired
- d = Defaulted

=== Draw ===
First round
1	(Netherlands) J-J Rojer (Romania) H Tecău	6^{5}	6	[10]
(Spain) F López (Spain) M López	7^{7}	2	[5]
WC	(Japan) B McLachlan (Japan) Y Uchiyama	6	6^{5}	[10]
Q	(Philippines) T Huey (Canada) A Shamasdin	2	7^{7}	[7]
3	(South Africa) R Klaasen (United States) R Ram	6	7^{7}
(Croatia) F Škugor (Serbia) V Troicki	3	6^{5}
(Poland) M Matkowski (Pakistan) A-u-H Qureshi	3	7	[10]
(Mexico) S González (Chile) J Peralta	6	5	[12]
WC	(Japan) T Matsui (Japan) Y Sugita	0	2
(Argentina) D Schwartzman (Austria) D Thiem	6	6
(United Kingdom) D Inglot (Canada) D Nestor	6	7^{7}
4	(United States) R Harrison (New Zealand) M Venus	4	6^{1}
(Croatia) N Mektić (United States) N Monroe	6^{3}	3
(New Zealand) M Daniell (Brazil) M Demoliner	7^{7}	6
(France) B Paire (Spain) A Ramos Viñolas	1	5
2	(United Kingdom) J Murray (Brazil) B Soares	6	7

Quarterfinals
1	(Netherlands) J-J Rojer (Romania) H Tecău	6^{2}	6^{3}
WC	(Japan) B McLachlan (Japan) Y Uchiyama	7^{7}	7^{7}
3	(South Africa) R Klaasen (United States) R Ram	6	6^{5}	[9]
(Mexico) S González (Chile) J Peralta	2	7^{7}	[11]
(Argentina) D Schwartzman (Austria) D Thiem	6	4	[3]
(United Kingdom) D Inglot (Canada) D Nestor	4	6	[10]
(New Zealand) M Daniell (Brazil) M Demoliner	3	4
2	(United Kingdom) J Murray (Brazil) B Soares	6	6

Semifinals
WC	(Japan) B McLachlan (Japan) Y Uchiyama	7	6
(Mexico) S González (Chile) J Peralta	5	4
(United Kingdom) D Inglot (Canada) D Nestor	7^{7}	1	[9]
2	(United Kingdom) J Murray (Brazil) B Soares	6^{3}	6	[11]

Final
WC	(Japan) B McLachlan (Japan) Y Uchiyama	6	7^{7}
2	(United Kingdom) J Murray (Brazil) B Soares	4	6^{1}

== Qualifying ==
=== Seeds ===
1. (Belarus) Max Mirnyi / (Austria) Philipp Oswald (first round)
2. (Philippines) Treat Huey / (Canada) Adil Shamasdin (qualified)

=== Qualifiers ===
1. (Philippines) Treat Huey / (Canada) Adil Shamasdin

=== Qualifying draw ===
First round
1	(Belarus) Max Mirnyi (Austria) Philipp Oswald	5	6^{6}
WC	(Japan) Sho Shimabukuro (Japan) Kaito Uesugi	7	7^{8}
(Moldova) Radu Albot (Russia) Daniil Medvedev	3	6^{8}
2	(Philippines) Treat Huey (Canada) Adil Shamasdin	6	7^{10}

Qualifying competition
WC	(Japan) Sho Shimabukuro (Japan) Kaito Uesugi	2	2
2	(Philippines) Treat Huey (Canada) Adil Shamasdin	6	6
