= 2017 Brasil Open – Doubles =

Doubles
- 2017 Brasil Open

Final
- Champions: (Brazil) Rogério Dutra Silva (Brazil) André Sá
- Runners-up: (New Zealand) Marcus Daniell (Brazil) Marcelo Demoliner
- Score: 7–6^{(7–5)}, 5–7, [10–7]

Details
- Draw: 16
- Seeds: 4

Events
Singles	Doubles
- Brasil Open

Julio Peralta and Horacio Zeballos were the defending champions, but lost in the quarterfinals to Facundo Bagnis and Guillermo Durán.

Rogério Dutra Silva and André Sá won the title, defeating Marcus Daniell and Marcelo Demoliner in the final, 7–6^{(7–5)}, 5–7, [10–7].

== Seeds ==
1. (Spain) Pablo Carreño Busta / (Uruguay) Pablo Cuevas (quarterfinals)
2. (Chile) Julio Peralta / (Argentina) Horacio Zeballos (quarterfinals)
3. (United States) Nicholas Monroe / (New Zealand) Artem Sitak (quarterfinals)
4. (New Zealand) Marcus Daniell / (Brazil) Marcelo Demoliner (final)

== Draw ==
Key

- Q = Qualifier
- WC = Wild card
- LL = Lucky loser
- Alt = Alternate
- ITF = ITF entry
- PR = Protected ranking
- SR = Special ranking
- SE = Special exempt
- JE = Junior exempt
- JR = Junior Accelerator Programme entrant
- CO = College Accelerator Programme entrant
- NG = Next Gen Accelerator Program entrant
- w/o = Walkover
- r = Retired
- d = Defaulted

=== Draw ===
First round
1	(Spain) P Carreño Busta (Uruguay) P Cuevas	6	3	[10]
(Sweden) J Brunström (Sweden) A Siljeström	4	6	[7]
(Argentina) F Delbonis (Argentina) M González	6	1	[8]
PR	(Italy) S Bolelli (Italy) F Fognini	3	6	[10]
3	(United States) N Monroe (New Zealand) A Sitak	7^{7}	7^{7}
(Portugal) G Elias (Portugal) J Sousa	6^{5}	6^{4}
(Brazil) R Dutra Silva (Brazil) A Sá	6	6
Alt	(Spain) Í Cervantes (Japan) T Daniel	3	4
(Italy) A Giannessi (Spain) A Ramos Viñolas	6	3	[7]
(Peru) S Galdós (Chile) H Podlipnik-Castillo	2	6	[10]
WC	(Serbia) D Lajović (Brazil) E Russi Assumpção	3	1
4	(New Zealand) M Daniell (Brazil) M Demoliner	6	6
(Argentina) F Bagnis (Argentina) G Durán	7	4	[10]
WC	(Brazil) F Neis (Brazil) J Souza	5	6	[6]
(Argentina) A Molteni (Argentina) D Schwartzman	4	3
2	(Chile) J Peralta (Argentina) H Zeballos	6	6

Quarterfinals
1	(Spain) P Carreño Busta (Uruguay) P Cuevas	0	7^{7}	[10]
PR	(Italy) S Bolelli (Italy) F Fognini	6	6^{3}	[12]
3	(United States) N Monroe (New Zealand) A Sitak	6^{4}	6	[6]
(Brazil) R Dutra Silva (Brazil) A Sá	7^{7}	2	[10]
(Peru) S Galdós (Chile) H Podlipnik-Castillo	3	2
4	(New Zealand) M Daniell (Brazil) M Demoliner	6	6
(Argentina) F Bagnis (Argentina) G Durán	7^{7}	7
2	(Chile) J Peralta (Argentina) H Zeballos	6^{4}	5

Semifinals
PR	(Italy) S Bolelli (Italy) F Fognini	3	2
(Brazil) R Dutra Silva (Brazil) A Sá	6	6
4	(New Zealand) M Daniell (Brazil) M Demoliner	6	7^{8}
(Argentina) F Bagnis (Argentina) G Durán	3	6^{6}

Final
(Brazil) R Dutra Silva (Brazil) A Sá	7^{7}	5	[10]
4	(New Zealand) M Daniell (Brazil) M Demoliner	6^{5}	7	[7]
