= 2025 European Open – Singles =

Singles
- 2025 European Open

Final
- Champion: (Canada) Félix Auger-Aliassime
- Runner-up: (Czech Republic) Jiří Lehečka
- Score: 7–6^{(7–2)}, 6–7^{(6–8)}, 6–2

Details
- Draw: 28 (4 Q / 3 WC)
- Seeds: 8

Events
Singles	Doubles
← 2024 ·	European Open	· 2026 →

Félix Auger-Aliassime defeated Jiří Lehečka in the final, 7–6^{(7–2)}, 6–7^{(6–8)}, 6–2 to win the singles tennis title at the 2025 European Open. It was his second European Open title (after 2022) and his eighth ATP Tour title overall.

Roberto Bautista Agut was the reigning champion, but withdrew before the tournament began.

== Seeds ==
The top four seeds received a bye into the second round.

1. (Italy) Lorenzo Musetti (quarterfinals)
2. (Canada) Félix Auger-Aliassime (champion)
3. (Czech Republic) Jiří Lehečka (final)
4. (Spain) Alejandro Davidovich Fokina (quarterfinals)
5. (France) Giovanni Mpetshi Perricard (semifinals)
6. (Argentina) Sebastián Báez (first round)
7. (Brazil) João Fonseca (first round)
8. (Belgium) Zizou Bergs (first round)

== Draw ==
=== Key ===
- Q = Qualifier
- WC = Wild card
- LL = Lucky loser
- Alt = Alternate
- ITF = ITF entry
- PR = Protected ranking
- SR = Special ranking
- SE = Special exempt
- JE = Junior exempt
- JR = Junior Accelerator Programme entrant
- CO = College Accelerator Programme entrant
- NG = Next Gen Accelerator Program entrant
- w/o = Walkover
- r = Retired
- d = Defaulted

=== Finals ===
Semifinals
5	(France) Giovanni Mpetshi Perricard	6^{3}	6^{7}
3	(Czech Republic) Jiří Lehečka	7^{7}	7^{9}
WC	(Belgium) Raphaël Collignon	6^{2}	4
2	(Canada) Félix Auger-Aliassime	7^{7}	6

Final
3	(Czech Republic) Jiří Lehečka	6^{2}	7^{8}	2
2	(Canada) Félix Auger-Aliassime	7^{7}	6^{6}	6

=== Top half ===
First round
Q	(Germany) Y Hanfmann	6^{4}	6	6
(Italy) M Arnaldi	7^{7}	4	4
(France) Q Halys	4	4
Q	(Georgia (country)) N Basilashvili	6	6
PR	(Finland) E Ruusuvuori	6^{4}	7^{7}	4
5	(France) G Mpetshi Perricard	7^{7}	6^{5}	6
(Germany) D Altmaier	4	7^{12}	3
Q	(Belgium) G-A Bailly	6	6^{10}	6
(United States) R Opelka	4	4
(France) B Bonzi	6	6
LL	(France) V Royer	6	6
6	(Argentina) S Báez	2	3

Second round
1	(Italy) L Musetti	7^{7}	7
Q	(Germany) Y Hanfmann	6^{3}	5
Q	(Georgia (country)) N Basilashvili	5	0^{r}
5	(France) G Mpetshi Perricard	7	0
3	(Czech Republic) J Lehečka	6	6
Q	(Belgium) G-A Bailly	3	2
(France) B Bonzi	7^{7}	4	6
LL	(France) V Royer	6^{3}	6	1

Quarterfinals
1	(Italy) L Musetti	4	6^{8}
5	(France) G Mpetshi Perricard	6	7^{10}
3	(Czech Republic) J Lehečka	6^{8}	6	4
(France) B Bonzi	7^{10}	1	1^{r}

Semifinals
5	(France) G Mpetshi Perricard	6^{3}	6^{7}
3	(Czech Republic) J Lehečka	7^{7}	7^{9}

=== Bottom half ===
First round
8	(Belgium) Z Bergs	4	6^{5}
WC	(Belgium) R Collignon	6	7^{7}
(Argentina) F Comesaña	7^{7}	6
WC	(Belgium) D Goffin	6^{5}	4
(United States) M Giron	6	6
(Italy) M Bellucci	3	4
7	(Brazil) J Fonseca	5	6^{2}
(Netherlands) B van de Zandschulp	7	7^{7}
Q	(United States) E Spizzirri	6	6
(Spain) P Martínez	4	1
WC	(Italy) F Cinà	7^{7}	2	6^{3}
(Bosnia and Herzegovina) D Džumhur	6^{5}	6	7^{7}

Second round
WC	(Belgium) R Collignon	7	3	7^{12}
(Argentina) F Comesaña	5	6	6^{10}
(United States) M Giron	7^{7}	1	4
4	(Spain) A Davidovich Fokina	6^{5}	6	6
(Netherlands) B van de Zandschulp	5	0
Q	(United States) E Spizzirri	7	6
(Bosnia and Herzegovina) D Džumhur	6^{3}	6	6^{5}
2	(Canada) F Auger-Aliassime	7^{7}	4	7^{7}

Quarterfinals
WC	(Belgium) R Collignon	7^{7}	6
4	(Spain) A Davidovich Fokina	6^{5}	1
Q	(United States) E Spizzirri	2	6^{6}
2	(Canada) F Auger-Aliassime	6	7^{8}

Semifinals
WC	(Belgium) R Collignon	6^{2}	4
2	(Canada) F Auger-Aliassime	7^{7}	6

== Qualifying ==
=== Seeds ===
1. (France) Valentin Royer (qualifying competition, lucky loser)
2. (Georgia (country)) Nikoloz Basilashvili (qualified)
3. (United States) Eliot Spizzirri (qualified)
4. (Portugal) Jaime Faria (first round)
5. (Belgium) Alexander Blockx (qualifying competition)
6. (Argentina) Marco Trungelliti (first round)
7. (France) Pierre-Hugues Herbert (qualifying competition)
8. (Germany) Yannick Hanfmann (qualified)

=== Qualifiers ===
1. (Belgium) Gilles-Arnaud Bailly
2. (Georgia (country)) Nikoloz Basilashvili
3. (United States) Eliot Spizzirri
4. (Germany) Yannick Hanfmann

=== Lucky loser ===
1. (France) Valentin Royer

=== Qualifying draw ===
==== First qualifier ====
First round
1	(France) Valentin Royer	6	7
(Spain) Daniel Mérida	3	5
Alt	(Belgium) Gilles-Arnaud Bailly	6	7^{8}
6	(Argentina) Marco Trungelliti	3	6^{6}

Qualifying competition
1	(France) Valentin Royer	6^{3}	6^{2}
Alt	(Belgium) Gilles-Arnaud Bailly	7^{7}	7^{7}

==== Second qualifier ====
First round
2	(Georgia (country)) Nikoloz Basilashvili	6	6
WC	(Belgium) Alessio Basile	4	4
(Austria) Jurij Rodionov	6^{5}	4
7	(France) Pierre-Hugues Herbert	7^{7}	6

Qualifying competition
2	(Georgia (country)) Nikoloz Basilashvili	3	6	7^{7}
7	(France) Pierre-Hugues Herbert	6	3	6^{4}

==== Third qualifier ====
First round
3	(United States) Eliot Spizzirri	5	7^{8}	6
(Hungary) Zsombor Piros	7	6^{6}	1
Alt	(Belgium) Gauthier Onclin	3	4
5	(Belgium) Alexander Blockx	6	6

Qualifying competition
3	(United States) Eliot Spizzirri	7^{7}	6
5	(Belgium) Alexander Blockx	6^{4}	3

==== Fourth qualifier ====
First round
4	(Portugal) Jaime Faria	6	3	4
WC	(Belgium) Tibo Colson	1	6	6
Alt	(France) Calvin Hemery	3	4
8	(Germany) Yannick Hanfmann	6	6

Qualifying competition
WC	(Belgium) Tibo Colson	7^{7}	5	2
8	(Germany) Yannick Hanfmann	6^{3}	7	6
