= 2025 European Open – Doubles =

Doubles
- 2025 European Open

Final
- Champions: (United States) Christian Harrison (United States) Evan King
- Runners-up: (Monaco) Hugo Nys (France) Édouard Roger-Vasselin
- Score: 7–6^{(12–10)}, 7–6^{(7–5)}

Events
Singles	Doubles
← 2024 ·	European Open	· 2026 →

Christian Harrison and Evan King defeated Hugo Nys and Édouard Roger-Vasselin in the final, 7–6^{(12–10)}, 7–6^{(7–5)} to win the doubles title at the 2025 European Open.

Alexander Erler and Lucas Miedler were the reigning champions but chose to compete with different partners in Stockholm instead.

== Seeds ==
1. (Monaco) Hugo Nys / (France) Édouard Roger-Vasselin (final)
2. (United States) Christian Harrison / (United States) Evan King (champions)
3. (Netherlands) Sander Arends / (United Kingdom) Luke Johnson (first round)
4. (Brazil) Rafael Matos / (Brazil) Marcelo Melo (semifinals)

== Draw ==
=== Key ===
- Q = Qualifier
- WC = Wild card
- LL = Lucky loser
- Alt = Alternate
- ITF = ITF entry
- PR = Protected ranking
- SR = Special ranking
- SE = Special exempt
- JE = Junior exempt
- JR = Junior Accelerator Programme entrant
- CO = College Accelerator Programme entrant
- NG = Next Gen Accelerator Program entrant
- w/o = Walkover
- r = Retired
- d = Defaulted

=== Draw ===
First round
1	(Monaco) H Nys (France) É Roger-Vasselin	7	6
(Germany) D Altmaier (Mexico) S González	5	2
(Uruguay) A Behar (Belgium) J Vliegen	7^{10}	6^{9}	[10]
(Monaco) R Arneodo (Belgium) S Gillé	6^{8}	7^{11}	[8]
3	(Netherlands) S Arends (United Kingdom) L Johnson	3	3
(France) B Bonzi (France) P-H Herbert	6	6
(Bosnia and Herzegovina) D Džumhur (Poland) P Matuszewski	7	6
WC	(Belgium) R Collignon (Belgium) D Goffin	5	3
(Argentina) S Báez (Argentina) F Comesaña	6	4	[5]
WC	(Belgium) A Blockx (Belgium) T Colson	3	6	[10]
(Brazil) M Demoliner (Brazil) O Luz	6^{4}	3
4	(Brazil) R Matos (Brazil) M Melo	7^{7}	6
Alt	(France) G Jacq (France) N Mahut	4	6^{4}
(Czech Republic) P Nouza (Czech Republic) P Rikl	6	7^{7}
(Spain) M Granollers (Spain) P Martínez	0^{r}
2	(United States) C Harrison (United States) E King	3

Quarterfinals
1	(Monaco) H Nys (France) É Roger-Vasselin	6	6
(Uruguay) A Behar (Belgium) J Vliegen	4	4
(France) B Bonzi (France) P-H Herbert	7	6
(Bosnia and Herzegovina) D Džumhur (Poland) P Matuszewski	5	1
WC	(Belgium) A Blockx (Belgium) T Colson	2	6^{2}
4	(Brazil) R Matos (Brazil) M Melo	6	7^{7}
(Czech Republic) P Nouza (Czech Republic) P Rikl	6^{2}	6^{4}
2	(United States) C Harrison (United States) E King	7^{7}	7^{7}

Semifinals
1	(Monaco) H Nys (France) É Roger-Vasselin	w/o
(France) B Bonzi (France) P-H Herbert
4	(Brazil) R Matos (Brazil) M Melo	6^{5}	6	[4]
2	(United States) C Harrison (United States) E King	7^{7}	2	[10]

Final
1	(Monaco) H Nys (France) É Roger-Vasselin	6^{10}	6^{5}
2	(United States) C Harrison (United States) E King	7^{12}	7^{7}
