= 2021 European Open =

Men's indoor tennis tournament

- Date: 18–24 October
- Edition: 6th
- Category: ATP Tour 250 Series
- Draw: 28S / 16D
- Prize money: €508,600
- Surface: Hard (indoor)
- Location: Antwerp, Belgium
- Venue: Lotto Arena

Champions

Singles
- (Italy) Jannik Sinner

Doubles
- (France) Nicolas Mahut / (France) Fabrice Martin
- European Open

The 2021 European Open was a men's tennis tournament played on indoor hard courts. It was the sixth edition of the European Open and part of the ATP Tour 250 series of the 2021 ATP Tour. It took place at the Lotto Arena in Antwerp, Belgium, from 18 October until 24 October 2021.

== Finals ==
=== Singles ===
- (Italy) Jannik Sinner defeated (Argentina) Diego Schwartzman, 6–2, 6–2

=== Doubles ===
- (France) Nicolas Mahut / (France) Fabrice Martin defeated (Netherlands) Wesley Koolhof / (Netherlands) Jean-Julien Rojer, 6–0, 6–1

== Singles main-draw entrants ==
=== Seeds ===
Country	Player	Rank^{1}	Seed
ITA	Jannik Sinner	14	1
ARG	Diego Schwartzman	15	2
CHI	Cristian Garín	17	3
ESP	Roberto Bautista Agut	19	4
USA	Reilly Opelka	20	5
AUS	Alex de Minaur	27	6
RSA	Lloyd Harris	31	7
SRB	Dušan Lajović	35	8

- Rankings are as of 4 October 2021.

=== Other entrants ===
The following players received wildcards into the singles main draw:

- (Belgium) Zizou Bergs
- (France) Richard Gasquet
- (United Kingdom) Andy Murray

The following players received entry from the qualifying draw:

- (United States) Jenson Brooksby
- (Switzerland) Henri Laaksonen
- (United States) Brandon Nakashima
- (Austria) Dennis Novak

=== Withdrawals ===
Before the tournament

- (Canada) Félix Auger-Aliassime → replaced by (Australia) Alexei Popyrin
- (Georgia (country)) Nikoloz Basilashvili → replaced by (Italy) Gianluca Mager
- (Spain) Pablo Carreño Busta → replaced by (Australia) Jordan Thompson
- (Bulgaria) Grigor Dimitrov → replaced by (France) Arthur Rinderknech
- (Italy) Fabio Fognini → replaced by (Italy) Lorenzo Musetti
- (France) Ugo Humbert → replaced by (Germany) Jan-Lennard Struff
- (United Kingdom) Cameron Norrie → replaced by (Netherlands) Botic van de Zandschulp

== Doubles main-draw entrants ==
=== Seeds ===
Country	Player	Country	Player	Rank^{1}	Seed
CRO	Ivan Dodig	BRA	Marcelo Melo	33	1
FRA	Nicolas Mahut	FRA	Fabrice Martin	44	2
NED	Wesley Koolhof	NED	Jean-Julien Rojer	52	3
BEL	Sander Gillé	BEL	Joran Vliegen	73	4

- Rankings are as of 4 October 2021.

=== Other entrants ===
The following pairs received wildcards into the doubles main draw:

- (Belgium) Ruben Bemelmans / (Belgium) Kimmer Coppejans
- (South Africa) Lloyd Harris / (Belgium) Xavier Malisse

=== Withdrawals ===
Before the tournament

- (Italy) Simone Bolelli / (Argentina) Máximo González → replaced by (Netherlands) David Pel / (Netherlands) Botic van de Zandschulp
- (Bulgaria) Grigor Dimitrov / (Denmark) Frederik Nielsen → replaced by (Denmark) Frederik Nielsen / (Croatia) Matej Sabanov
- (Italy) Fabio Fognini / (Czech Republic) Roman Jebavý → replaced by (Czech Republic) Roman Jebavý / (Belarus) Andrei Vasilevski
- (Chile) Cristian Garín / (Spain) David Vega Hernández → replaced by (Argentina) Federico Delbonis / (Spain) David Vega Hernández
- (Croatia) Nikola Mektić / (Croatia) Mate Pavić → replaced by (Israel) Jonathan Erlich / (Sweden) André Göransson
- (Australia) John Peers / (Slovakia) Filip Polášek → replaced by (Monaco) Romain Arneodo / (Australia) Matt Reid
- (Germany) Tim Pütz / (New Zealand) Michael Venus → replaced by (Ukraine) Denys Molchanov / (Kazakhstan) Aleksandr Nedovyesov

During the tournament

- (Italy) Lorenzo Musetti / (France) Benoît Paire
