= 2018 European Open =

- Date: 15–21 October
- Edition: 3rd
- Category: ATP World Tour 250 series
- Draw: 28S / 16D
- Prize money: €612,755
- Surface: Hard / indoor
- Location: Antwerp, Belgium

Champions

Singles
- (United Kingdom) Kyle Edmund

Doubles
- (France) Nicolas Mahut / (France) Édouard Roger-Vasselin
- European Open

The 2018 European Open was a men's tennis tournament played on indoor hard courts. It was the third edition of the European Open and part of the ATP World Tour 250 series of the 2018 ATP World Tour. It took place at the Lotto Arena in Antwerp, Belgium, from October 15 to October 21.

== Singles main-draw entrants ==
=== Seeds ===
Country	Player	Rank^{1}	Seed
GBR	Kyle Edmund	14	1
ARG	Diego Schwartzman	16	2
CAN	Milos Raonic	20	3
FRA	Richard Gasquet	25	4
FRA	Gilles Simon	31	5
FRA	Gaël Monfils	37	6
USA	Frances Tiafoe	40	7
NED	Robin Haase	44	8

- ^{1} Rankings are as of October 8, 2018

=== Other entrants ===
The following players received wildcards into the singles main draw:

- (Belgium) Ruben Bemelmans
- (Canada) Milos Raonic
- (United States) Frances Tiafoe

The following players received entry from the qualifying draw:

- (Spain) Marcel Granollers
- (Netherlands) ~~Tallon Griekspoor~~
- (Belarus) Ilya Ivashka
- (Ukraine) Sergiy Stakhovsky

The following players received entry as lucky losers:

- (Italy) Salvatore Caruso
- (France) Constant Lestienne
- (France) Stéphane Robert

=== Withdrawals ===
Before the tournament

- (Georgia (country)) Nikoloz Basilashvili → replaced by (India) Yuki Bhambri
- (Spain) Roberto Carballés Baena → replaced by (Italy) Salvatore Caruso
- (Belgium) David Goffin → replaced by (Czech Republic) Jiří Veselý
- (Netherlands) Tallon Griekspoor → replaced by (France) Stéphane Robert
- (Slovakia) Jozef Kovalík → replaced by (France) Constant Lestienne

During the tournament

- (Belarus) Ilya Ivashka

== Doubles main-draw entrants ==
=== Seeds ===
Country	Player	Country	Player	Rank^{1}	Seed
JPN	Ben McLachlan	GER	Jan-Lennard Struff	43	1
FRA	Nicolas Mahut	FRA	Édouard Roger-Vasselin	44	2
NED	Robin Haase	NED	Matwé Middelkoop	65	3
IND	Divij Sharan	NZL	Artem Sitak	75	4

- ^{1} Rankings are as of October 8, 2018

=== Other entrants ===
The following pairs received wildcards into the doubles main draw:

- (Belgium) Ruben Bemelmans / (Belgium) Joris De Loore
- (Belgium) Sander Gillé / (Belgium) Joran Vliegen

== Finals ==
=== Singles ===
- (United Kingdom) Kyle Edmund defeated (France) Gaël Monfils, 3–6, 7–6^{(7–2)}, 7–6^{(7–4)}

=== Doubles ===
- (France) Nicolas Mahut / (France) Édouard Roger-Vasselin defeated (Brazil) Marcelo Demoliner / (Mexico) Santiago González, 6–4, 7–5
