= 2019 European Open – Singles =

Singles
- 2019 European Open

Final
- Champion: (United Kingdom) Andy Murray
- Runner-up: (Switzerland) Stan Wawrinka
- Score: 3–6, 6–4, 6–4

Details
- Draw: 28 (4 Q / 3 WC )
- Seeds: 8

Events
Singles	Doubles
← 2018 ·	European Open (tennis)	· 2020 →

Andy Murray defeated Stan Wawrinka in the final, 3–6, 6–4, 6–4 to win the singles tennis title at the 2019 European Open. It was Murray's first singles title since the 2017 Dubai Tennis Championships, his first appearance in an ATP Tour singles final and only title after his career-saving hip resurfacing operation, and his 46th and last ATP Tour-level title.

Kyle Edmund was the defending champion, but lost in the first round of qualifying to Norbert Gombos.

== Seeds ==
The top four seeds receive a bye into the second round.

1. (France) Gaël Monfils (second round)
2. (Belgium) David Goffin (second round)
3. (Argentina) Diego Schwartzman (second round)
4. (Switzerland) Stan Wawrinka (final)
5. (Argentina) Guido Pella (quarterfinals)
6. (France) Jo-Wilfried Tsonga (second round)
7. (Germany) Jan-Lennard Struff (second round)
8. (Uruguay) Pablo Cuevas (second round)

== Draw ==
Key

- Q = Qualifier
- WC = Wild card
- LL = Lucky loser
- Alt = Alternate
- ITF = ITF entry
- PR = Protected ranking
- SR = Special ranking
- SE = Special exempt
- JE = Junior exempt
- JR = Junior Accelerator Programme entrant
- CO = College Accelerator Programme entrant
- NG = Next Gen Accelerator Program entrant
- w/o = Walkover
- r = Retired
- d = Defaulted

=== Finals ===
Semifinals
WC	(Italy) Jannik Sinner	3	2
4/WC	(Switzerland) Stan Wawrinka	6	6
PR	(United Kingdom) Andy Murray	3	7	6
(France) Ugo Humbert	6	5	2

Final
4/WC	(Switzerland) Stan Wawrinka	6	4	4
PR	(United Kingdom) Andy Murray	3	6	6

=== Top half ===
First round
Q	(Poland) K Majchrzak	4	2
WC	(Italy) J Sinner	6	6
(United States) F Tiafoe	7^{9}	6
Q	(Germany) Y Maden	6^{7}	3
Q	(France) G Barrère	2	1
7	(Germany) J-L Struff	6	6
(Spain) F López	7^{7}	6
(United Kingdom) C Norrie	6^{2}	4
(France) G Simon	6	6
PR	(Belgium) S Darcis	1	2
(Italy) L Sonego	3	4
6	(France) J-W Tsonga	6	6

Second round
1	(France) G Monfils	3	2
WC	(Italy) J Sinner	6	6
(United States) F Tiafoe	6	6
7	(Germany) J-L Struff	3	4
4/WC	(Switzerland) S Wawrinka	6^{4}	6	7^{7}
(Spain) F López	7^{7}	4	6^{4}
(France) G Simon	6	7
6	(France) J-W Tsonga	4	5

Quarterfinals
WC	(Italy) J Sinner	6	3	6
(United States) F Tiafoe	4	6	3
4/WC	(Switzerland) S Wawrinka	6	6^{6}	6
(France) G Simon	3	7^{8}	2

Semifinals
WC	(Italy) J Sinner	3	2
4/WC	(Switzerland) S Wawrinka	6	6

=== Bottom half ===
First round
8	(Uruguay) P Cuevas	6	6
(Bolivia) H Dellien	4	3
PR	(United Kingdom) A Murray	6	7^{7}
WC	(Belgium) K Coppejans	4	6^{4}
(Argentina) F Delbonis	4	6^{3}
Q	(Romania) M Copil	6	7^{7}
5	(Argentina) G Pella	5	6	7^{7}
(Germany) P Gojowczyk	7	4	6^{2}
(South Korea) S-w Kwon	1	6	6
(France) R Gasquet	6	3	4
(France) U Humbert	6	7
PR	(Slovakia) J Kovalík	4	5

Second round
8	(Uruguay) P Cuevas	4	3
PR	(United Kingdom) A Murray	6	6
Q	(Romania) M Copil	6	5	7^{9}
3	(Argentina) D Schwartzman	4	7	6^{7}
5	(Argentina) G Pella	7	7
(South Korea) S-w Kwon	5	5
(France) U Humbert	6	6
2	(Belgium) D Goffin	3	1

Quarterfinals
PR	(United Kingdom) A Murray	6	6^{7}	6
Q	(Romania) M Copil	3	7^{9}	4
5	(Argentina) G Pella	7	4	4
(France) U Humbert	5	6	6

Semifinals
PR	(United Kingdom) A Murray	3	7	6
(France) U Humbert	6	5	2

== Qualifying ==
=== Seeds ===
1. (United Kingdom) Kyle Edmund (first round)
2. (France) Grégoire Barrère (qualified)
3. (Poland) Kamil Majchrzak (qualified)
4. (Romania) Marius Copil (qualified)
5. (Italy) Salvatore Caruso (first round)
6. (Spain) Jaume Munar (qualifying competition)
7. (France) Antoine Hoang (qualifying competition)
8. (Italy) Paolo Lorenzi (qualifying competition)

=== Qualifiers ===
1. (Germany) Yannick Maden
2. (France) Grégoire Barrère
3. (Poland) Kamil Majchrzak
4. (Romania) Marius Copil

=== Qualifying draw ===
==== First qualifier ====
First round
1/WC	(United Kingdom) Kyle Edmund	4	7^{8}	3
(Slovakia) Norbert Gombos	6	6^{6}	6
(Germany) Yannick Maden	6	6
5	(Italy) Salvatore Caruso	2	4

Qualifying competition
(Slovakia) Norbert Gombos	1	6	4
(Germany) Yannick Maden	6	3	6

==== Second qualifier ====
First round
2	(France) Grégoire Barrère	6	6
(Spain) Pedro Martínez	0	4
WC	(Belgium) Arnaud Bovy	7^{7}	1	4
8	(Italy) Paolo Lorenzi	6^{5}	6	6

Qualifying competition
2	(France) Grégoire Barrère	6	6
8	(Italy) Paolo Lorenzi	1	4

==== Third qualifier ====
First round
3	(Poland) Kamil Majchrzak	6	6
(Ukraine) Sergiy Stakhovsky	3	3
(Argentina) Marco Trungelliti	3	4
6	(Spain) Jaume Munar	6	6

Qualifying competition
3	(Poland) Kamil Majchrzak	7^{7}	6
6	(Spain) Jaume Munar	6^{5}	1

==== Fourth qualifier ====
First round
4	(Romania) Marius Copil	6	6
(Belgium) Ruben Bemelmans	4	4
Alt	(Spain) Carlos Taberner	2	6	2
7	(France) Antoine Hoang	6	3	6

Qualifying competition
4	(Romania) Marius Copil	6	6
7	(France) Antoine Hoang	1	3
