= 2022 European Open =

Men's indoor tennis tournament

- Date: 17–23 October
- Edition: 7th
- Category: ATP Tour 250 Series
- Draw: 28S / 16D
- Prize money: €648,130
- Surface: Hard (indoor)
- Location: Antwerp, Belgium
- Venue: Lotto Arena

Champions

Singles
- (Canada) Félix Auger-Aliassime

Doubles
- (Netherlands) Tallon Griekspoor / (Netherlands) Botic van de Zandschulp
- European Open

The 2022 European Open was a men's tennis tournament played on indoor hard courts. It was the seventh edition of the European Open and part of the ATP Tour 250 series of the 2022 ATP Tour. It took place at the Lotto Arena in Antwerp, Belgium, from 17 October until 23 October 2022.

== Champions ==
=== Singles ===
- (Canada) Félix Auger-Aliassime def. (United States) Sebastian Korda, 6–3, 6–4

=== Doubles ===
- (Netherlands) Tallon Griekspoor / (Netherlands) Botic van de Zandschulp def. (India) Rohan Bopanna / (Netherlands) Matwé Middelkoop, 3–6, 6–3, [10–5]

== Singles main-draw entrants ==
=== Seeds ===
Country	Player	Rank^{1}	Seed
POL	Hubert Hurkacz	11	1
CAN	Félix Auger-Aliassime	13	2
ARG	Diego Schwartzman	18	3
	Karen Khachanov	19	4
GBR	Dan Evans	25	5
ARG	Francisco Cerúndolo	29	6
NED	Botic van de Zandschulp	34	7
JPN	Yoshihito Nishioka	41	8

- Rankings are as of 10 October 2022

=== Other entrants ===
The following players received wildcards into the singles main draw:

- (Belgium) Gilles-Arnaud Bailly
- (Belgium) Michael Geerts
- (Switzerland) Stan Wawrinka

The following player was accepted directly into the main draw using a protected ranking:

- (Austria) Dominic Thiem

The following players received entry from the qualifying draw:

- (Netherlands) Jesper de Jong
- (Switzerland) Dominic Stricker
- (France) Luca Van Assche
- (Netherlands) Tim van Rijthoven

The following players received entry as lucky losers:

- (France) Geoffrey Blancaneaux
- (France) Manuel Guinard

=== Withdrawals ===
- (Kazakhstan) Alexander Bublik → replaced by (Switzerland) Marc-Andrea Hüsler
- (Croatia) Borna Ćorić → replaced by (Belgium) David Goffin
- (United Kingdom) Andy Murray → replaced by (France) Manuel Guinard
- (France) Arthur Rinderknech → replaced by (France) Geoffrey Blancaneaux

== Doubles main-draw entrants ==
=== Seeds ===
Country	Player	Country	Player	Rank^{1}	Seed
COL	Juan Sebastián Cabal	COL	Robert Farah	30	1
IND	Rohan Bopanna	NED	Matwé Middelkoop	45	2
GER	Kevin Krawietz	GER	Andreas Mies	56	3
FRA	Nicolas Mahut	FRA	Édouard Roger-Vasselin	67	4

- Rankings are as of 10 October 2022.

=== Other entrants ===
The following pairs received wildcards into the doubles main draw:

- (Belgium) Ruben Bemelmans / (Belgium) Alexander Blockx
- (Belgium) Xavier Malisse / (Argentina) Diego Schwartzman

The following pair received entry as alternates:

- (Serbia) Ivan Sabanov / (Serbia) Matej Sabanov

=== Withdrawals ===
- (United States) Marcos Giron / (United States) Sebastian Korda → replaced by (Serbia) Ivan Sabanov / (Serbia) Matej Sabanov
- (Spain) Marcel Granollers / (Argentina) Horacio Zeballos → replaced by (Netherlands) Sander Arends / (Netherlands) David Pel
