= 2023 European Open =

Men's indoor tennis tournament

- Date: 16–22 October
- Edition: 8th
- Category: ATP Tour 250 Series
- Draw: 28S / 16D
- Prize money: €673,630
- Surface: Hard (indoor)
- Location: Antwerp, Belgium
- Venue: Lotto Arena

Champions

Singles
- (Kazakhstan) Alexander Bublik

Doubles
- (Greece) Petros Tsitsipas / (Greece) Stefanos Tsitsipas
- European Open

The 2023 European Open is a men's tennis tournament currently played on indoor hard courts. It is the eighth edition of the European Open and part of the ATP Tour 250 series of the 2023 ATP Tour. It takes place at the Lotto Arena in Antwerp, Belgium, from 16 October until 22 October 2023.

== Champions ==
=== Singles ===
- (Kazakhstan) Alexander Bublik def. (France) Arthur Fils, 6–4, 6–4

=== Doubles ===
- (Greece) Petros Tsitsipas / (Greece) Stefanos Tsitsipas def. (Uruguay) Ariel Behar / (Czech Republic) Adam Pavlásek, 6–7^{(5–7)}, 6–4, [10–8]

== Singles main-draw entrants ==
=== Seeds ===
Country	Player	Rank^{1}	Seed
GRE	Stefanos Tsitsipas	6	1
GER	Jan-Lennard Struff	27	2
KAZ	Alexander Bublik	35	3
FRA	Arthur Fils	44	4
GER	Yannick Hanfmann	53	5
ESP	Roberto Carballés Baena	61	6
FRA	Richard Gasquet	63	7
PER	Juan Pablo Varillas	65	8

- Rankings are as of 2 October 2023.

=== Other entrants ===
The following players received wildcards into the singles main draw:

- (Belgium) David Goffin
- (Estonia) Mark Lajal
- (Italy) Luca Nardi

The following players received entry from the qualifying draw:

- (Belgium) Alexander Blockx
- (France) Benjamin Bonzi
- (Germany) Maximilian Marterer
- (France) Giovanni Mpetshi Perricard

=== Withdrawals ===
- (Italy) Matteo Arnaldi → replaced by Alexander Shevchenko
- (Croatia) Borna Ćorić → replaced by (Spain) Jaume Munar
- (Bulgaria) Grigor Dimitrov → replaced by (France) Hugo Gaston
- (France) Ugo Humbert → replaced by (Portugal) Nuno Borges
- (United States) Sebastian Korda → replaced by (Hungary) Fábián Marozsán
- (Italy) Jannik Sinner → replaced by (Switzerland) Dominic Stricker
- (France) Luca Van Assche → replaced by (Germany) Dominik Koepfer

== Doubles main-draw entrants ==
=== Seeds ===
Country	Player	Country	Player	Rank^{1}	Seed
MEX	Santiago González	FRA	Édouard Roger-Vasselin	22	1
GER	Kevin Krawietz	GER	Tim Pütz	40	2
GBR	Lloyd Glasspool	MON	Hugo Nys	55	3
NED	Matwé Middelkoop	GER	Andreas Mies	72	4

- Rankings are as of 2 October 2023.

=== Other entrants ===
The following pairs received wildcards into the doubles main draw:

- (Belgium) Zizou Bergs / (Belgium) Tibo Colson
- (Belgium) Michael Geerts / (Belgium) Gauthier Onclin

The following pair received entry as alternates:

- (Romania) Victor Vlad Cornea / (Czech Republic) Petr Nouza

=== Withdrawals ===
- (Netherlands) Sander Arends / (Netherlands) David Pel → replaced by (Netherlands) Sander Arends / (France) Quentin Halys → replaced by (Romania) Victor Vlad Cornea / (Czech Republic) Petr Nouza
- (Spain) Roberto Carballés Baena / (Spain) Bernabé Zapata Miralles → replaced by (Spain) Roberto Carballés Baena / (Spain) Jaume Munar
- (United Kingdom) Lloyd Glasspool / (France) Nicolas Mahut → replaced by (United Kingdom) Lloyd Glasspool / (Monaco) Hugo Nys
