= 2024 European Open =

Men's indoor tennis tournament

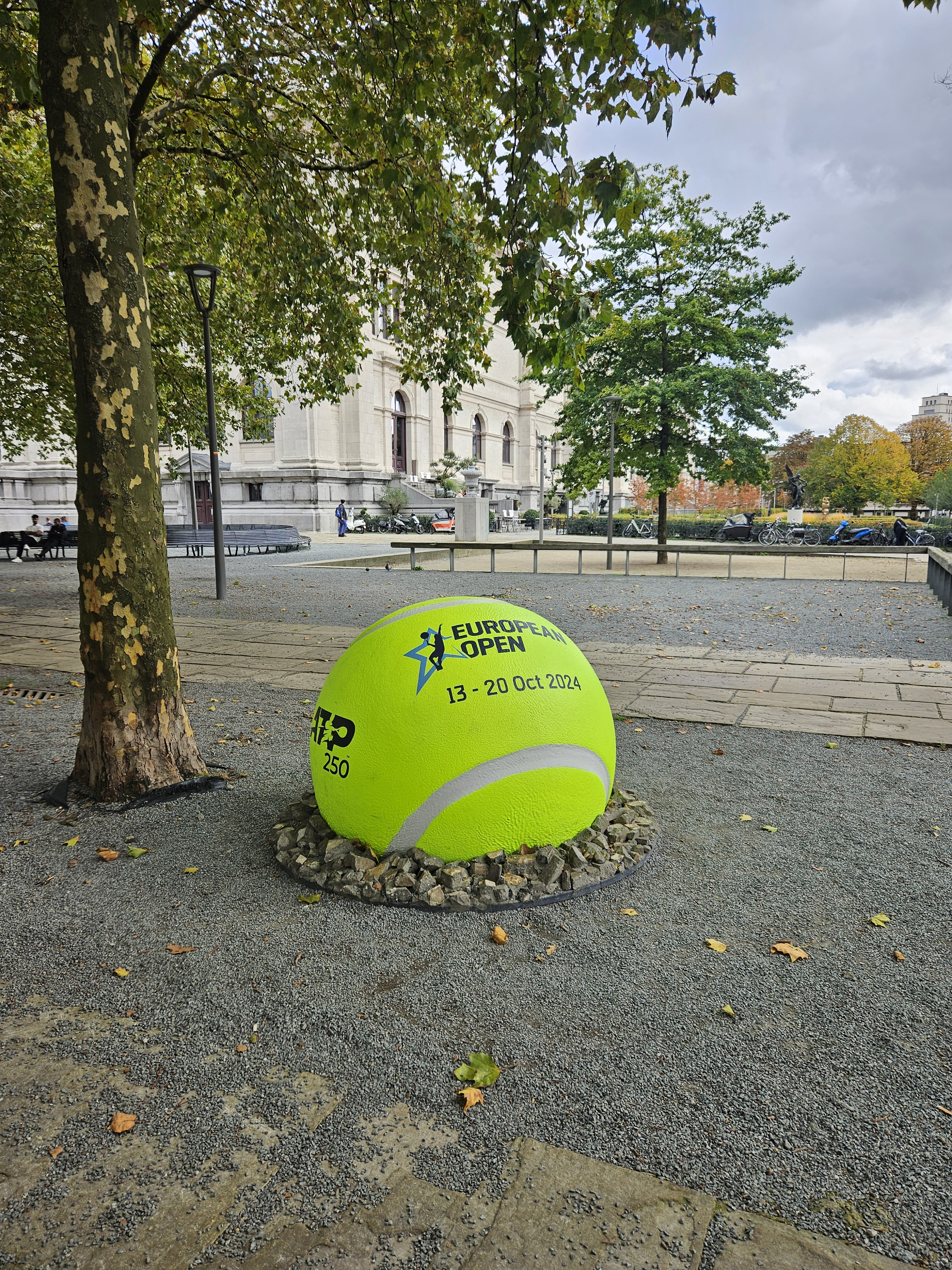
- Date: 14–20 October
- Edition: 9th
- Category: ATP Tour 250 Series
- Draw: 28S / 16D
- Prize money: €690,135
- Surface: Hard (indoor)
- Location: Antwerp, Belgium
- Venue: Lotto Arena

Champions

Singles
- (Spain) Roberto Bautista Agut

Doubles
- (Austria) Alexander Erler / (Austria) Lucas Miedler
- European Open

The 2024 European Open was a men's tennis tournament played on indoor hard courts. It was the ninth edition of the European Open and part of the ATP Tour 250 series of the 2024 ATP Tour. It took place at the Lotto Arena in Antwerp, Belgium, from 14 October until 20 October 2024.

== Champions ==
=== Singles ===
- (Spain) Roberto Bautista Agut def. (Czech Republic) Jiří Lehečka, 7–5, 6–1

=== Doubles ===
- (Austria) Alexander Erler / (Austria) Lucas Miedler def. (United States) Robert Galloway / (Kazakhstan) Aleksandr Nedovyesov, 6–4, 1–6, [10–8]

== Singles main-draw entrants ==
=== Seeds ===
Country	Player	Rank^{1}	Seed
AUS	Alex de Minaur	11	1
GRE	Stefanos Tsitsipas	12	2
CAN	Félix Auger-Aliassime	21	3
ARG	Sebastián Báez	26	4
CZE	Jiří Lehečka	34	5
ARG	Tomás Martín Etcheverry	37	6
ARG	Mariano Navone	38	7
USA	Marcos Giron	47	8

- Rankings are as of 30 September 2024.

=== Other entrants ===
The following players received wildcards into the singles main draw:

- (Belgium) Alexander Blockx
- (Belgium) Raphaël Collignon
- (France) Richard Gasquet

The following player received a late entry into the singles main draw:

- (Australia) Alex de Minaur

The following players received entry from the qualifying draw:

- (Brazil) Thiago Seyboth Wild
- Alexey Vatutin
- (Belgium) Gilles-Arnaud Bailly
- (France) Luca Van Assche

=== Withdrawals ===
- (Portugal) Nuno Borges → replaced by (Hungary) Márton Fucsovics
- (Czech Republic) Jakub Menšík → replaced by (Brazil) Thiago Monteiro
- (China) Shang Juncheng → replaced by (Spain) Jaume Munar
- (Australia) Jordan Thompson → replaced by (Germany) Daniel Altmaier

== Doubles main-draw entrants ==
=== Seeds ===
Country	Player	Country	Player	Rank^{1}	Seed
GER	Kevin Krawietz	GER	Tim Pütz	26	1
MEX	Santiago González	FRA	Édouard Roger-Vasselin	47	2
BEL	Sander Gillé	BEL	Joran Vliegen	66	3
CRO	Ivan Dodig	CZE	Adam Pavlásek	73	4

- Rankings are as of 30 September 2024.

=== Other entrants ===
The following pairs received wildcards into the doubles main draw:

- (Belgium) Alexander Blockx / (Belgium) Raphaël Collignon
- (Belgium) Michael Geerts / (Germany) Yannick Hanfmann

=== Withdrawals ===
- (Netherlands) Robin Haase / (Netherlands) Botic van de Zandschulp → replaced by (Netherlands) Robin Haase / (Netherlands) David Pel
