= 2019 European Open =

- Date: 14–20 October
- Edition: 4th
- Category: ATP Tour 250 series
- Draw: 28S / 16D
- Prize money: €635,750
- Surface: Hard / indoor
- Location: Antwerp, Belgium

Champions

Singles
- (United Kingdom) Andy Murray

Doubles
- (Germany) Kevin Krawietz / (Germany) Andreas Mies
- European Open

The 2019 European Open was a men's tennis tournament played on indoor hard courts. It was the fourth edition of the European Open and part of the ATP Tour 250 series of the 2019 ATP Tour. It took place at the Lotto Arena in Antwerp, Belgium, from October 14 to October 20.

== Singles main-draw entrants ==
=== Seeds ===
Country	Player	Rank^{1}	Seed
FRA	Gaël Monfils	11	1
BEL	David Goffin	14	2
ARG	Diego Schwartzman	16	3
SUI	Stan Wawrinka	20	4
ARG	Guido Pella	21	5
FRA	Jo-Wilfried Tsonga	35	6
GER	Jan-Lennard Struff	38	7
URU	Pablo Cuevas	48	8

- ^{1} Rankings are as of October 7, 2019

=== Other entrants ===
The following players received wildcards into the singles main draw:

- (Belgium) Kimmer Coppejans
- (Italy) Jannik Sinner
- (Switzerland) Stan Wawrinka

The following players received entry using a protected ranking into the singles main draw:

- (Belgium) Steve Darcis
- (Slovakia) Jozef Kovalík
- (United Kingdom) Andy Murray

The following players received entry from the qualifying draw:

- (France) Grégoire Barrère
- (Romania) Marius Copil
- (Germany) Yannick Maden
- (Poland) Kamil Majchrzak

=== Withdrawals ===
Before the tournament

- (France) Benoît Paire → replaced by (Bolivia) Hugo Dellien
- (Spain) Albert Ramos Viñolas → replaced by (South Korea) Kwon Soon-woo
- (Canada) Milos Raonic → replaced by (Germany) Peter Gojowczyk

== Doubles main-draw entrants ==
=== Seeds ===
Country	Player	Country	Player	Rank^{1}	Seed
GER	Kevin Krawietz	GER	Andreas Mies	26	1
USA	Rajeev Ram	GBR	Joe Salisbury	35	2
AUT	Oliver Marach	AUT	Jürgen Melzer	53	3
BEL	Sander Gillé	BEL	Joran Vliegen	83	4

- ^{1} Rankings are as of October 7, 2019

=== Other entrants ===
The following pairs received wildcards into the doubles main draw:

- (Belgium) Ruben Bemelmans / (Belgium) Kimmer Coppejans
- (Belgium) Arnaud Bovy / (Belgium) Steve Darcis

The following pair received entry as alternates:

- (Italy) Paolo Lorenzi / (Italy) Jannik Sinner

=== Withdrawals ===
Before the tournament

- (Spain) Feliciano López

During the tournament

- (Argentina) Diego Schwartzman

== Finals ==
=== Singles ===
- (United Kingdom) Andy Murray defeated (Switzerland) Stan Wawrinka, 3–6, 6–4, 6–4

=== Doubles ===
- (Germany) Kevin Krawietz / (Germany) Andreas Mies defeated (United States) Rajeev Ram / (United Kingdom) Joe Salisbury, 7–6^{(7–1)}, 6–3
