= 2022 European Open – Doubles =

Doubles
- 2022 European Open

Final
- Champions: (Netherlands) Tallon Griekspoor (Netherlands) Botic van de Zandschulp
- Runners-up: (India) Rohan Bopanna (Netherlands) Matwé Middelkoop
- Score: 3–6, 6–3, [10–5]

Events
Singles	Doubles
← 2021 ·	European Open	· 2023 →

Tallon Griekspoor and Botic van de Zandschulp defeated Rohan Bopanna and Matwé Middelkoop in the final, 3–6, 6–3, [10–5] to win the doubles tennis title at the 2022 European Open.

Nicolas Mahut and Fabrice Martin were the reigning champions, but Martin chose to compete in Naples instead. Mahut partnered Édouard Roger-Vasselin, but lost in the semifinals to Griekspoor and van de Zandschulp.

== Seeds ==
1. (Colombia) Juan Sebastián Cabal / (Colombia) Robert Farah (first round)
2. (India) Rohan Bopanna / (Netherlands) Matwé Middelkoop (final)
3. (Germany) Kevin Krawietz / (Germany) Andreas Mies (quarterfinals)
4. (France) Nicolas Mahut / (France) Édouard Roger-Vasselin (semifinals)

== Draw ==
=== Key ===
- Q = Qualifier
- WC = Wild card
- LL = Lucky loser
- Alt = Alternate
- SE = Special exempt
- PR = Protected ranking
- ITF = ITF entry
- JE = Junior exempt
- w/o = Walkover
- r = Retired
- d = Defaulted
- SR = Special ranking

=== Draw ===
First round
1	(Colombia) JS Cabal (Colombia) R Farah	2	5
(Netherlands) T Griekspoor (Netherlands) B van de Zandschulp	6	7
(South Africa) R Klaasen (Brazil) M Melo	6^{4}	5
WC	(Belgium) X Malisse (Argentina) D Schwartzman	7^{7}	7
4	(France) N Mahut (France) É Roger-Vasselin	6^{2}	6	[10]
(United States) N Lammons (United States) J Withrow	7^{7}	4	[7]
WC	(Belgium) R Bemelmans (Belgium) A Blockx	0	2
(Monaco) H Nys (Poland) J Zieliński	6	6
(Argentina) F Cerúndolo (Argentina) M González	6^{4}	3
PR	(Netherlands) S Arends (Netherlands) D Pel	7^{7}	6
(Austria) A Erler (Austria) L Miedler	7	6^{4}	[6]
3	(Germany) K Krawietz (Germany) A Mies	5	7^{7}	[10]
(United Kingdom) D Evans (United Kingdom) J O'Mara	6	6
Alt	(Serbia) I Sabanov (Serbia) M Sabanov	3	2
(Belgium) S Gillé (Belgium) J Vliegen	6	6^{5}	[4]
2	(India) R Bopanna (Netherlands) M Middelkoop	3	7^{7}	[10]

Quarterfinals
(Netherlands) T Griekspoor (Netherlands) B van de Zandschulp	7^{7}	7^{9}
WC	(Belgium) X Malisse (Argentina) D Schwartzman	6^{1}	6^{7}
4	(France) N Mahut (France) É Roger-Vasselin	2	6	[10]
(Monaco) H Nys (Poland) J Zieliński	6	1	[6]
PR	(Netherlands) S Arends (Netherlands) D Pel	4	6	[10]
3	(Germany) K Krawietz (Germany) A Mies	6	3	[4]
(United Kingdom) D Evans (United Kingdom) J O'Mara	4	1
2	(India) R Bopanna (Netherlands) M Middelkoop	6	6

Semifinals
(Netherlands) T Griekspoor (Netherlands) B van de Zandschulp	6	6
4	(France) N Mahut (France) É Roger-Vasselin	3	4
PR	(Netherlands) S Arends (Netherlands) D Pel	6^{6}	6	[7]
2	(India) R Bopanna (Netherlands) M Middelkoop	7^{8}	2	[10]

Final
(Netherlands) T Griekspoor (Netherlands) B van de Zandschulp	3	6	[10]
2	(India) R Bopanna (Netherlands) M Middelkoop	6	3	[5]
