= 2017 European Open =

- Date: 16–22 October
- Edition: 2nd
- Category: ATP World Tour 250 series
- Draw: 28S/16D
- Prize money: €589,185
- Surface: Hard / indoor
- Location: Antwerp, Belgium
- Venue: Lotto Arena

Champions

Singles
- (France) Jo-Wilfried Tsonga

Doubles
- (United States) Scott Lipsky / (India) Divij Sharan
- European Open

The 2017 European Open was a men's tennis tournament played on indoor hard courts. It was the second edition of the European Open and part of the ATP World Tour 250 series of the 2017 ATP World Tour. It was taking place at the Lotto Arena in Antwerp, Belgium, from October 16 to October 22.

== Finals ==
=== Singles ===
- (France) Jo-Wilfried Tsonga defeated (Argentina) Diego Schwartzman, 6–3, 7–5

=== Doubles ===
- (United States) Scott Lipsky / (India) Divij Sharan defeated (Mexico) Santiago González / (Chile) Julio Peralta, 6–4, 2–6, [10–5]

== Singles main-draw entrants ==
=== Seeds ===
| Country | Player | Rank^{1} | Seed |
|---|---|---|---|
| BEL | David Goffin | 10 | 1 |
| FRA | Jo-Wilfried Tsonga | 18 | 2 |
| AUS | Nick Kyrgios | 21 | 3 |
| ARG | Diego Schwartzman | 26 | 4 |
| ESP | David Ferrer | 30 | 5 |
| URU | Pablo Cuevas | 32 | 6 |
| FRA | Benoît Paire | 38 | 7 |
| UKR | Alexandr Dolgopolov | 41 | 8 |

- ^{1} Rankings are as of October 9, 2017

=== Other entrants ===
The following players received wildcards into the singles main draw:

- (Australia) Nick Kyrgios
- (United States) Frances Tiafoe
- (France) Jo-Wilfried Tsonga

The following players received entry from the qualifying draw:

- (France) Kenny de Schepper
- (Bosnia and Herzegovina) Aldin Šetkić
- (Italy) Stefano Travaglia
- (Greece) Stefanos Tsitsipas

=== Withdrawals ===
Before the tournament

- (United Kingdom) Aljaž Bedene →replaced by (Germany) Peter Gojowczyk
- (United Kingdom) Kyle Edmund →replaced by (Belgium) Ruben Bemelmans
- (France) Richard Gasquet →replaced by (Germany) Cedrik-Marcel Stebe
- (France) Gaël Monfils →replaced by (France) Julien Benneteau
- (United States) Donald Young →replaced by (Ukraine) Sergiy Stakhovsky

=== Retirements ===
- (Georgia (country)) Nikoloz Basilashvili
- (Croatia) Ivo Karlović
- (Germany) Cedrik-Marcel Stebe

== Doubles main-draw entrants ==
=== Seeds ===
| Country | Player | Country | Player | Rank^{1} | Seed |
|---|---|---|---|---|---|
| USA | Bob Bryan | USA | Mike Bryan | 12 | 1 |
| CRO | Ivan Dodig | ESP | Marcel Granollers | 31 | 2 |
| RSA | Raven Klaasen | USA | Rajeev Ram | 37 | 3 |
| FRA | Fabrice Martin | FRA | Édouard Roger-Vasselin | 61 | 4 |

- ^{1} Rankings are as of October 9, 2017

=== Other entrants ===
The following pairs received wildcards into the doubles main draw:

- (Belgium) Steve Darcis / (Belgium) Arthur De Greef
- (Belgium) Sander Gillé / (Belgium) Joran Vliegen
