= 2019 European Open – Doubles =

Doubles
- 2019 European Open

Final
- Champions: (Germany) Kevin Krawietz (Germany) Andreas Mies
- Runners-up: (United States) Rajeev Ram (United Kingdom) Joe Salisbury
- Score: 7–6^{(7–1)}, 6–3

Events
Singles	Doubles
- European Open (tennis)

Nicolas Mahut and Édouard Roger-Vasselin were the defending champions, but Mahut chose not to defend the title and Roger-Vasselin chose to compete in Stockholm instead.

Kevin Krawietz and Andreas Mies won the title, defeating Rajeev Ram and Joe Salisbury in the final, 7–6^{(7–1)}, 6–3.

== Seeds ==
1. (Germany) Kevin Krawietz / (Germany) Andreas Mies (champions)
2. (United States) Rajeev Ram / (United Kingdom) Joe Salisbury (final)
3. (Austria) Oliver Marach / (Austria) Jürgen Melzer (first round)
4. (Belgium) Sander Gillé / (Belgium) Joran Vliegen (semifinals)

== Draw ==
Key

- Q = Qualifier
- WC = Wild card
- LL = Lucky loser
- Alt = Alternate
- ITF = ITF entry
- PR = Protected ranking
- SR = Special ranking
- SE = Special exempt
- JE = Junior exempt
- JR = Junior Accelerator Programme entrant
- CO = College Accelerator Programme entrant
- NG = Next Gen Accelerator Program entrant
- w/o = Walkover
- r = Retired
- d = Defaulted

=== Draw ===
First round
1	(Germany) K Krawietz (Germany) A Mies	6	6
WC	(Belgium) R Bemelmans (Belgium) K Coppejans	3	4
(South Korea) S-w Kwon (United Kingdom) C Norrie	2	0
(Netherlands) S Arends (Netherlands) D Pel	6	6
3	(Austria) O Marach (Austria) J Melzer	3	1
Alt	(Italy) P Lorenzi (Italy) J Sinner	6	6
(Uruguay) P Cuevas (Argentina) M González	7^{7}	7
WC	(Belgium) A Bovy (Belgium) S Darcis	6^{5}	5
(Mexico) S González (Pakistan) A-u-H Qureshi	7	7^{7}
(Italy) L Sonego (Italy) A Vavassori	5	6^{4}
(Denmark) F Nielsen (Germany) T Pütz	3	6	[7]
4	(Belgium) S Gillé (Belgium) J Vliegen	6	4	[10]
(Argentina) G Pella (Argentina) D Schwartzman	7	2	[10]
(Israel) J Erlich (New Zealand) A Sitak	5	6	[7]
(Ukraine) D Molchanov (Belarus) A Vasilevski	5	4
2	(United States) R Ram (United Kingdom) J Salisbury	7	6

Quarterfinals
1	(Germany) K Krawietz (Germany) A Mies	6	6
(Netherlands) S Arends (Netherlands) D Pel	4	3
Alt	(Italy) P Lorenzi (Italy) J Sinner	6	6
(Uruguay) P Cuevas (Argentina) M González	3	3
(Mexico) S González (Pakistan) A-u-H Qureshi	4	2
4	(Belgium) S Gillé (Belgium) J Vliegen	6	6
(Argentina) G Pella (Argentina) D Schwartzman
2	(United States) R Ram (United Kingdom) J Salisbury	^{w/o}

Semifinals
1	(Germany) K Krawietz (Germany) A Mies	6	7
Alt	(Italy) P Lorenzi (Italy) J Sinner	1	5
4	(Belgium) S Gillé (Belgium) J Vliegen	7^{7}	4	[4]
2	(United States) R Ram (United Kingdom) J Salisbury	6^{5}	6	[10]

Final
1	(Germany) K Krawietz (Germany) A Mies	7^{7}	6
2	(United States) R Ram (United Kingdom) J Salisbury	6^{1}	3
