= 2023 European Open – Doubles =

Doubles
- 2023 European Open

Final
- Champions: (Greece) Petros Tsitsipas (Greece) Stefanos Tsitsipas
- Runners-up: (Uruguay) Ariel Behar (Czech Republic) Adam Pavlásek
- Score: 6–7^{(5–7)}, 6–4, [10–8]

Events
Singles	Doubles
← 2022 ·	European Open	· 2024 →

Petros Tsitsipas and Stefanos Tsitsipas defeated Ariel Behar and Adam Pavlásek in the final, 6–7^{(5–7)}, 6–4, [10–8] to win the doubles tennis title at the 2023 European Open. It was Petros' first ATP Tour title.

Tallon Griekspoor and Botic van de Zandschulp were the reigning champions, but Griekspoor chose to compete in Stockholm and van de Zandschulp chose not to participate in doubles this year.

== Seeds ==
1. (Mexico) Santiago González / (France) Édouard Roger-Vasselin (first round)
2. (Germany) Kevin Krawietz / (Germany) Tim Pütz (first round)
3. (United Kingdom) Lloyd Glasspool / (Monaco) Hugo Nys (semifinals)
4. (Netherlands) Matwé Middelkoop / (Germany) Andreas Mies (quarterfinals)

== Draw ==
=== Key ===
- Q = Qualifier
- WC = Wild card
- LL = Lucky loser
- Alt = Alternate
- ITF = ITF entry
- PR = Protected ranking
- SR = Special ranking
- SE = Special exempt
- JE = Junior exempt
- JR = Junior Accelerator Programme entrant
- CO = College Accelerator Programme entrant
- NG = Next Gen Accelerator Program entrant
- w/o = Walkover
- r = Retired
- d = Defaulted

=== Draw ===
First round
1	(Mexico) S González (France) É Roger-Vasselin	3	7^{7}	[7]
(Uruguay) A Behar (Czech Republic) A Pavlásek	6	6^{2}	[10]
Alt	(Romania) VV Cornea (Czech Republic) P Nouza	6	6^{1}	[6]
(United States) E King (United States) R Stalder	1	7^{7}	[10]
3	(United Kingdom) L Glasspool (Monaco) H Nys	7	6^{5}	[10]
(Germany) C Frantzen (Germany) H Jebens	5	7^{7}	[3]
(Kazakhstan) A Bublik; A Shevchenko	7^{7}	4	[12]
WC	(Belgium) M Geerts (Belgium) G Onclin	6^{4}	6	[10]
(Mexico) MÁ Reyes-Varela (Spain) D Vega Hernández	6^{7}	6^{2}
(Greece) Pe Tsitsipas (Greece) S Tsitsipas	7^{9}	7^{7}
WC	(Belgium) Z Bergs (Belgium) T Colson	4	7^{10}	[6]
4	(Netherlands) M Middelkoop (Germany) A Mies	6	6^{8}	[10]
(Netherlands) R Haase (Austria) P Oswald	6^{3}	7^{7}	[12]
(Spain) R Carballés Baena (Spain) J Munar	7^{7}	6^{3}	[10]
(Monaco) R Arneodo (Austria) S Weissborn	6	4	[10]
2	(Germany) K Krawietz (Germany) T Pütz	4	6	[8]

Quarterfinals
(Uruguay) A Behar (Czech Republic) A Pavlásek	7^{7}	6
(United States) E King (United States) R Stalder	6^{2}	4
3	(United Kingdom) L Glasspool (Monaco) H Nys	6	6
(Kazakhstan) A Bublik; A Shevchenko	3	3
(Greece) Pe Tsitsipas (Greece) S Tsitsipas	7	6
4	(Netherlands) M Middelkoop (Germany) A Mies	5	3
(Netherlands) R Haase (Austria) P Oswald	4	5
(Monaco) R Arneodo (Austria) S Weissborn	6	7

Semifinals
(Uruguay) A Behar (Czech Republic) A Pavlásek	6	3	[10]
3	(United Kingdom) L Glasspool (Monaco) H Nys	4	6	[5]
(Greece) Pe Tsitsipas (Greece) S Tsitsipas	4	7^{7}	[13]
(Monaco) R Arneodo (Austria) S Weissborn	6	6^{5}	[11]

Final
(Uruguay) A Behar (Czech Republic) A Pavlásek	7^{7}	4	[8]
(Greece) Pe Tsitsipas (Greece) S Tsitsipas	6^{5}	6	[10]
