= 2021 European Open – Singles =

Singles
- 2021 European Open

Final
- Champion: (Italy) Jannik Sinner
- Runner-up: (Argentina) Diego Schwartzman
- Score: 6–2, 6–2

Details
- Draw: 28 (4 Q / 3 WC )
- Seeds: 8

Events
Singles	Doubles
← 2020 ·	European Open	· 2022 →

Ugo Humbert was the defending champion, but chose not to participate this year.

Jannik Sinner won the title, defeating Diego Schwartzman in the final, 6–2, 6–2.

== Seeds ==
The top four seeds received a bye into the second round.

1. (Italy) Jannik Sinner (champion)
2. (Argentina) Diego Schwartzman (final)
3. (Chile) Cristian Garín (second round)
4. (Spain) Roberto Bautista Agut (second round)
5. (United States) Reilly Opelka (first round)
6. (Australia) Alex de Minaur (first round)
7. (South Africa) Lloyd Harris (semifinals)
8. (Serbia) Dušan Lajović (second round)

== Draw ==
=== Key ===
- Q = Qualifier
- WC = Wild card
- LL = Lucky loser
- Alt = Alternate
- ITF = ITF entry
- PR = Protected ranking
- SR = Special ranking
- SE = Special exempt
- JE = Junior exempt
- JR = Junior Accelerator Programme entrant
- CO = College Accelerator Programme entrant
- NG = Next Gen Accelerator Program entrant
- w/o = Walkover
- r = Retired
- d = Defaulted

=== Finals ===
Semifinals
1	(Italy) Jannik Sinner	6	6
7	(South Africa) Lloyd Harris	2	2
Q	(United States) Jenson Brooksby	4	0
2	(Argentina) Diego Schwartzman	6	6

Final
1	(Italy) Jannik Sinner	6	6
2	(Argentina) Diego Schwartzman	2	2

=== Top half ===
First round
(Italy) L Musetti	7^{7}	7^{7}
(Italy) G Mager	6^{2}	6^{3}
(Argentina) F Delbonis	4	4
(France) A Rinderknech	6	6
WC	(France) R Gasquet	6^{3}	1
8	(Serbia) D Lajović	7^{7}	6
Q	(Austria) D Novak	6^{4}	2
(Hungary) M Fucsovics	7^{7}	6
(Germany) J-L Struff	6	3	6
(Spain) A Ramos Viñolas	3	6	3
WC	(Belgium) Z Bergs	6^{4}	3
7	(South Africa) L Harris	7^{7}	6

Second round
1	(Italy) J Sinner	7	6
(Italy) L Musetti	5	2
(France) A Rinderknech	6	4	6
8	(Serbia) D Lajović	3	6	2
4	(Spain) R Bautista Agut	7^{7}	3	1
(Hungary) M Fucsovics	6^{5}	6	6
(Germany) J-L Struff	2	3
7	(South Africa) L Harris	6	6

Quarterfinals
1	(Italy) J Sinner	6	6
(France) A Rinderknech	4	2
(Hungary) M Fucsovics	2	5
7	(South Africa) L Harris	6	7

Semifinals
1	(Italy) J Sinner	6	6
7	(South Africa) L Harris	2	2

=== Bottom half ===
First round
5	(United States) R Opelka	4	4
Q	(United States) J Brooksby	6	6
(Australia) A Popyrin	4	6	0
(Netherlands) B van de Zandschulp	6	3	6
(Spain) A Davidovich Fokina	6	6
(Australia) J Thompson	3	3
6	(Australia) A de Minaur	4	0
Q	(United States) B Nakashima	6	6
Q	(Switzerland) H Laaksonen	4	6	6
(France) B Paire	6	0	3
(United States) F Tiafoe	6^{2}	7^{9}	6^{8}
WC	(United Kingdom) A Murray	7^{7}	6^{7}	7^{10}

Second round
Q	(United States) J Brooksby	6	6
(Netherlands) B van de Zandschulp	2	0
(Spain) A Davidovich Fokina	4	6	6
3	(Chile) C Garín	6	3	3
Q	(United States) B Nakashima	7^{7}	6^{5}	6
Q	(Switzerland) H Laaksonen	6^{5}	7^{7}	3
WC	(United Kingdom) A Murray	4	6^{6}
2	(Argentina) D Schwartzman	6	7^{8}

Quarterfinals
Q	(United States) J Brooksby	7	6
(Spain) A Davidovich Fokina	5	0
Q	(United States) B Nakashima	4	2
2	(Argentina) D Schwartzman	6	6

Semifinals
Q	(United States) J Brooksby	4	0
2	(Argentina) D Schwartzman	6	6

== Qualifying ==
=== Seeds ===
1. (United States) Jenson Brooksby (qualified)
2. (United States) Brandon Nakashima (qualified)
3. (Spain) Roberto Carballés Baena (qualifying competition)
4. (Italy) Andreas Seppi (qualifying competition)
5. (Switzerland) Henri Laaksonen (qualified)
6. (France) Pierre-Hugues Herbert (qualifying competition)
7. (Austria) Dennis Novak (qualified)
8. (Slovakia) Norbert Gombos (qualifying competition)

=== Qualifiers ===
1. (United States) Jenson Brooksby
2. (United States) Brandon Nakashima
3. (Switzerland) Henri Laaksonen
4. (Austria) Dennis Novak

=== Qualifying draw ===
==== First qualifier ====
First round
1	(United States) Jenson Brooksby	6	6
WC	(Belgium) Michael Geerts	4	2
(Spain) Bernabé Zapata Miralles	3	2
8	(Slovakia) Norbert Gombos	6	6

Qualifying competition
1	(United States) Jenson Brooksby	6	6
8	(Slovakia) Norbert Gombos	4	2

==== Second qualifier ====
First round
2	(United States) Brandon Nakashima	6	2	6
(Spain) Fernando Verdasco	4	6	3
(Denmark) Holger Rune	3	4
6/Alt	(France) Pierre-Hugues Herbert	6	6

Qualifying competition
2	(United States) Brandon Nakashima	6	6
6/Alt	(France) Pierre-Hugues Herbert	2	4

==== Third qualifier ====
First round
3	(Spain) Roberto Carballés Baena	6	3	6
(United Kingdom) Liam Broady	4	6	4
(Germany) Yannick Hanfmann	6	6^{3}	3
5	(Switzerland) Henri Laaksonen	0	7^{7}	6

Qualifying competition
3	(Spain) Roberto Carballés Baena	5	1
5	(Switzerland) Henri Laaksonen	7	6

==== Fourth qualifier ====
First round
4	(Italy) Andreas Seppi	6	7
WC	(Belgium) Gauthier Onclin	4	5
(Slovakia) Jozef Kovalík	0	1
7	(Austria) Dennis Novak	6	6

Qualifying competition
4	(Italy) Andreas Seppi	6^{9}	6	6^{6}
7	(Austria) Dennis Novak	7^{11}	3	7^{8}
