= 2018 European Open – Singles =

Singles
- 2018 European Open

Final
- Champion: (United Kingdom) Kyle Edmund
- Runner-up: (France) Gaël Monfils
- Score: 3–6, 7–6^{(7–2)}, 7–6^{(7–4)}

Details
- Draw: 28 (4 Q / 3 WC )
- Seeds: 8

Events
Singles	Doubles
← 2017 ·	European Open (tennis)	· 2019 →

Jo-Wilfried Tsonga was the defending champion, but lost in the second round to Gaël Monfils.

Kyle Edmund won his first ATP World Tour title, defeating Monfils in the final, 3–6, 7–6^{(7–2)}, 7–6^{(7–4)}.

== Seeds ==
The top four seeds receive a bye into the second round.

1. (United Kingdom) Kyle Edmund (champion)
2. (Argentina) Diego Schwartzman (semifinals)
3. (Canada) Milos Raonic (second round)
4. (France) Richard Gasquet (semifinals)
5. (France) Gilles Simon (quarterfinals)
6. (France) Gaël Monfils (final)
7. (United States) Frances Tiafoe (first round)
8. (Netherlands) Robin Haase (first round)

== Draw ==
=== Key ===
- Q = Qualifier
- WC = Wild card
- LL = Lucky loser
- Alt = Alternate
- SE = Special exempt
- PR = Protected ranking
- ITF = ITF entry
- JE = Junior exempt
- w/o = Walkover
- r = Retired
- d = Defaulted
- SR = Special ranking

=== Finals ===
Semifinals
1	(United Kingdom) Kyle Edmund	6	6
4	(France) Richard Gasquet	3	4
6	(France) Gaël Monfils	6	6
2	(Argentina) Diego Schwartzman	3	4

Final
1	(United Kingdom) Kyle Edmund	3	7^{7}	7^{7}
6	(France) Gaël Monfils	6	6^{2}	6^{4}

=== Top half ===
First round
(Spain) A Ramos Viñolas	6	6
LL	(France) S Robert	4	4
(India) Y Bhambri	6^{6}	7	1
LL	(Italy) S Caruso	7^{8}	5	6
Q	(Belarus) I Ivashka	7^{7}	7^{10}
8	(Netherlands) R Haase	6^{5}	6^{8}
(Spain) J Munar	4	4
(Czech Republic) J Veselý	6	6
(Germany) J-L Struff	6	6
LL	(France) C Lestienne	2	3
(Spain) F López	6	7^{7}
7/WC	(United States) F Tiafoe	4	6^{5}

Second round
1	(United Kingdom) K Edmund	6	6
(Spain) A Ramos Viñolas	0	2
LL	(Italy) S Caruso	3	7^{10}	5
Q	(Belarus) I Ivashka	6	6^{8}	7
4	(France) R Gasquet	6	4	6
(Czech Republic) J Veselý	3	6	3
(Germany) J-L Struff	6	3	7^{7}
(Spain) F López	1	6	6^{3}

Quarterfinals
1	(United Kingdom) K Edmund	w/o
Q	(Belarus) I Ivashka
4	(France) R Gasquet	6	6^{4}	7^{11}
(Germany) J-L Struff	4	7^{7}	6^{9}

Semifinals
1	(United Kingdom) K Edmund	6	6
4	(France) R Gasquet	3	4

=== Bottom half ===
First round
6	(France) G Monfils	6	6
WC	(Belgium) R Bemelmans	0	3
(France) J-W Tsonga	7	5	7^{7}
(Argentina) G Pella	5	7	6^{5}
(Argentina) L Mayer	3	5
(Canada) V Pospisil	6	7
5	(France) G Simon	6	6
Q	(Ukraine) S Stakhovsky	0	4
(United States) M McDonald	6	7^{10}
(Chile) N Jarry	1	6^{8}
Q	(Spain) M Granollers	3	2
(United Kingdom) C Norrie	6	6

Second round
6	(France) G Monfils	6	3	6
(France) J-W Tsonga	4	6	4
(Canada) V Pospisil	7^{7}	7
3/WC	(Canada) M Raonic	6^{3}	5
5	(France) G Simon	6	6
(United States) M McDonald	1	1
(United Kingdom) C Norrie	6^{1}	7^{7}	5
2	(Argentina) D Schwartzman	7^{7}	6^{3}	7

Quarterfinals
6	(France) G Monfils	7	6
(Canada) V Pospisil	5	4
5	(France) G Simon	4	3
2	(Argentina) D Schwartzman	6	6

Semifinals
6	(France) G Monfils	6	6
2	(Argentina) D Schwartzman	3	4

== Qualifying ==
=== Seeds ===
1. (Spain) Marcel Granollers (qualified)
2. (Belarus) Ilya Ivashka (qualified)
3. (France) Corentin Moutet (first round)
4. (Canada) Félix Auger-Aliassime (qualifying competition, retired)
5. (Ukraine) Sergiy Stakhovsky (qualified)
6. (France) Constant Lestienne (qualifying competition, lucky loser)
7. (France) Stéphane Robert (qualifying competition, lucky loser)
8. (Italy) Salvatore Caruso (qualifying competition, lucky loser)

=== Qualifiers ===
1. (Spain) Marcel Granollers
2. (Belarus) Ilya Ivashka
3. (Netherlands) Tallon Griekspoor
4. (Ukraine) Sergiy Stakhovsky

=== Lucky losers ===
1. (France) Constant Lestienne
2. (France) Stéphane Robert
3. (Italy) Salvatore Caruso

=== Qualifying draw ===
==== First qualifier ====
First round
1	(Spain) Marcel Granollers	6	6
WC	(Belgium) Yannick Mertens	4	4
(Netherlands) Scott Griekspoor	7^{7}	3	2
8	(Italy) Salvatore Caruso	6^{2}	6	6

Qualifying competition
1	(Spain) Marcel Granollers	6	5	6
8	(Italy) Salvatore Caruso	4	7	2

==== Second qualifier ====
First round
2	(Belarus) Ilya Ivashka	6	6
(France) Antoine Hoang	3	3
(France) Nicolas Mahut	2	6	6^{3}
6	(France) Constant Lestienne	6	4	7^{7}

Qualifying competition
2	(Belarus) Ilya Ivashka	4	7^{7}	6
6	(France) Constant Lestienne	6	6^{1}	3

==== Third qualifier ====
First round
3	(France) Corentin Moutet	2	1
(Netherlands) Tallon Griekspoor	6	6
Alt	(Portugal) Frederico Ferreira Silva	5	7	4
7	(France) Stéphane Robert	7	5	6

Qualifying competition
(Netherlands) Tallon Griekspoor	7^{7}	6
7	(France) Stéphane Robert	6^{2}	3

==== Fourth qualifier ====
First round
4	(Canada) Félix Auger-Aliassime	5	6	7^{7}
WC	(Belgium) Zizou Bergs	7	3	6^{2}
(France) Kenny de Schepper	6^{7}	4
5	(Ukraine) Sergiy Stakhovsky	7^{9}	6

Qualifying competition
4	(Canada) Félix Auger-Aliassime	2	0^{r}
5	(Ukraine) Sergiy Stakhovsky	6	3
