= 2017 European Open – Doubles =

Doubles
- 2017 European Open

Final
- Champions: (United States) Scott Lipsky (India) Divij Sharan
- Runners-up: (Mexico) Santiago González (Chile) Julio Peralta
- Score: 6–4, 2–6, [10–5]

Events
Singles	Doubles
- European Open

Daniel Nestor and Édouard Roger-Vasselin were the defending champions but chose not to participate together. Nestor played alongside Dominic Inglot, but lost in the first round to Santiago González and Julio Peralta. Roger-Vasselin teamed up with Fabrice Martin, but lost in the quarterfinals to Wesley Koolhof and Artem Sitak.

Scott Lipsky and Divij Sharan won the title, defeating González and Peralta in the final, 6–4, 2–6, [10–5].

== Seeds ==
1. (United States) Bob Bryan / (United States) Mike Bryan (quarterfinals)
2. (Croatia) Ivan Dodig / (Spain) Marcel Granollers (semifinals)
3. (South Africa) Raven Klaasen / (United States) Rajeev Ram (quarterfinals)
4. (France) Fabrice Martin / (France) Édouard Roger-Vasselin (quarterfinals)

== Draw ==
Key

- Q = Qualifier
- WC = Wild card
- LL = Lucky loser
- Alt = Alternate
- ITF = ITF entry
- PR = Protected ranking
- SR = Special ranking
- SE = Special exempt
- JE = Junior exempt
- JR = Junior Accelerator Programme entrant
- CO = College Accelerator Programme entrant
- NG = Next Gen Accelerator Program entrant
- w/o = Walkover
- r = Retired
- d = Defaulted

=== Draw ===
First round
1	(United States) B Bryan (United States) M Bryan	6	7
WC	(Belgium) S Gillé (Belgium) J Vliegen	4	5
(Mexico) S González (Chile) J Peralta	6	6^{7}	[10]
(United Kingdom) D Inglot (Canada) D Nestor	1	7^{9}	[6]
4	(France) F Martin (France) É Roger-Vasselin	6	6
(Czech Republic) R Jebavý (Netherlands) M Middelkoop	4	4
(United Kingdom) K Skupski (United Kingdom) N Skupski	4	6	[8]
(Netherlands) W Koolhof (New Zealand) A Sitak	6	4	[10]
WC	(Belgium) S Darcis (Belgium) A De Greef	5	6	[8]
(United States) S Lipsky (India) D Sharan	7	4	[10]
(Germany) F Mayer (Germany) C-M Stebe	5	1
3	(South Africa) R Klaasen (United States) R Ram	7	6
(Japan) B McLachlan (Argentina) A Molteni	6^{5}	7	[10]
(Germany) A Begemann (France) H Nys	7^{7}	5	[8]
(Australia) N Kyrgios (Australia) M Reid	6	1	[7]
2	(Croatia) I Dodig (Spain) M Granollers	4	6	[10]

Quarterfinals
1	(United States) B Bryan (United States) M Bryan	6	6^{8}	[7]
(Mexico) S González (Chile) J Peralta	1	7^{10}	[10]
4	(France) F Martin (France) É Roger-Vasselin	4	6^{4}
(Netherlands) W Koolhof (New Zealand) A Sitak	6	7^{7}
(United States) S Lipsky (India) D Sharan	6	4	[10]
3	(South Africa) R Klaasen (United States) R Ram	4	6	[8]
(Japan) B McLachlan (Argentina) A Molteni	2	7^{7}	[7]
2	(Croatia) I Dodig (Spain) M Granollers	6	6^{4}	[10]

Semifinals
(Mexico) S González (Chile) J Peralta	7	6
(Netherlands) W Koolhof (New Zealand) A Sitak	5	3
(United States) S Lipsky (India) D Sharan	0	6	[10]
2	(Croatia) I Dodig (Spain) M Granollers	6	4	[5]

Final
(Mexico) S González (Chile) J Peralta	4	6	[5]
(United States) S Lipsky (India) D Sharan	6	2	[10]
