= 2017 European Open – Singles =

Singles
- 2017 European Open

Final
- Champion: (France) Jo-Wilfried Tsonga
- Runner-up: (Argentina) Diego Schwartzman
- Score: 6–3, 7–5

Details
- Draw: 28 (4 Q / 3 WC )
- Seeds: 8

Events
Singles	Doubles
← 2016 ·	European Open	· 2018 →

Richard Gasquet was the defending champion but withdrew before the tournament began.

Jo-Wilfried Tsonga won the title, defeating Diego Schwartzman in the final, 6–3, 7–5.

== Seeds ==
The top four seeds receive a bye into the second round.

1. (Belgium) David Goffin (quarterfinals)
2. (France) Jo-Wilfried Tsonga (champion)
3. (Australia) Nick Kyrgios (second round)
4. (Argentina) Diego Schwartzman (final)
5. (Spain) David Ferrer (quarterfinals)
6. (Uruguay) Pablo Cuevas (first round)
7. (France) Benoît Paire (first round)
8. (Ukraine) Alexandr Dolgopolov (first round)

== Draw ==
=== Key ===
- Q = Qualifier
- WC = Wild card
- LL = Lucky loser
- Alt = Alternate
- SE = Special exempt
- PR = Protected ranking
- ITF = ITF entry
- JE = Junior exempt
- w/o = Walkover
- r = Retired
- d = Defaulted
- SR = Special ranking

=== Finals ===
Semifinals
Q	(Greece) Stefanos Tsitsipas	3	5
4	(Argentina) Diego Schwartzman	6	7
(Belgium) Ruben Bemelmans	3	3
2/WC	(France) Jo-Wilfried Tsonga	6	6

Final
4	(Argentina) Diego Schwartzman	3	5
2/WC	(France) Jo-Wilfried Tsonga	6	7

=== Top half ===
First round
(Germany) F Mayer	3	4
WC	(United States) F Tiafoe	6	6
(Croatia) I Karlović	3	7	7^{12}
(Argentina) G Pella	6	5	6^{10}
Q	(Greece) S Tsitsipas	6	6
6	(Uruguay) P Cuevas	1	4
(United States) E Escobedo	7^{7}	6
(Canada) D Shapovalov	6^{5}	4
(Germany) C-M Stebe	6	4	0^{r}
(Belgium) S Darcis	4	6	1
Q	(Italy) S Travaglia	6	4	6^{3}
5	(Spain) D Ferrer	4	6	7^{7}

Second round
1	(Belgium) D Goffin	7^{7}	6
WC	(United States) F Tiafoe	6^{1}	2
(Croatia) I Karlović	6^{4}	6^{r}
Q	(Greece) S Tsitsipas	7^{7}	5
4	(Argentina) D Schwartzman	6	7^{7}
(United States) E Escobedo	3	6^{5}
(Belgium) S Darcis	5	7	3
5	(Spain) D Ferrer	7	5	6

Quarterfinals
1	(Belgium) D Goffin	6	6^{1}	6^{4}
Q	(Greece) S Tsitsipas	2	7^{7}	7^{7}
4	(Argentina) D Schwartzman	7	6
5	(Spain) D Ferrer	5	2

Semifinals
Q	(Greece) S Tsitsipas	3	5
4	(Argentina) D Schwartzman	6	7

=== Bottom half ===
First round
7	(France) B Paire	4	7^{7}	5
(Portugal) J Sousa	6	6^{2}	7
(Ukraine) S Stakhovsky	7^{7}	6
(United States) J Donaldson	6^{4}	4
(Belgium) R Bemelmans	4	7^{7}	7^{7}
(Germany) P Gojowczyk	6	6^{5}	6^{2}
8	(Ukraine) A Dolgopolov	2	6^{5}
(Switzerland) H Laaksonen	6	7^{7}
(Georgia (country)) N Basilashvili	4	0^{r}
(France) J Benneteau	6	0
Q	(Bosnia and Herzegovina) A Šetkić	2	1
Q	(France) K de Schepper	6	6

Second round
(Portugal) J Sousa	5	6	6
(Ukraine) S Stakhovsky	7	4	4
(Belgium) R Bemelmans	6^{3}	6	6
3/WC	(Australia) N Kyrgios	7^{7}	3	3
(Switzerland) H Laaksonen	1	1
(France) J Benneteau	6	6
Q	(France) K de Schepper	4	3
2/WC	(France) J-W Tsonga	6	6

Quarterfinals
(Portugal) J Sousa	6	6^{2}	4
(Belgium) R Bemelmans	4	7^{7}	6
(France) J Benneteau	6^{5}	2
2/WC	(France) J-W Tsonga	7^{7}	6

Semifinals
(Belgium) R Bemelmans	3	3
2/WC	(France) J-W Tsonga	6	6

== Qualifying ==
=== Seeds ===
1. (Canada) Vasek Pospisil (qualifying competition)
2. (France) Nicolas Mahut (first round)
3. (France) Quentin Halys (first round)
4. (Greece) Stefanos Tsitsipas (qualified)
5. (Italy) Stefano Travaglia (qualified)
6. (Austria) Sebastian Ofner (qualifying competition)
7. (Australia) Bernard Tomic (qualifying competition)
8. (Belgium) Arthur De Greef (first round)

=== Qualifiers ===
1. (Italy) Stefano Travaglia
2. (Bosnia and Herzegovina) Aldin Šetkić
3. (France) Kenny de Schepper
4. (Greece) Stefanos Tsitsipas

=== Qualifying draw ===
==== First qualifier ====
First round
1	(Canada) Vasek Pospisil	3	7	6
(Germany) Yannick Maden	6	5	0
WC	(Belgium) Kimmer Coppejans	6	2	3
5	(Italy) Stefano Travaglia	4	6	6

Qualifying competition
1	(Canada) Vasek Pospisil	6	3	4
5	(Italy) Stefano Travaglia	3	6	6

==== Second qualifier ====
First round
2	(France) Nicolas Mahut	5	6^{1}
(Bosnia and Herzegovina) Aldin Šetkić	7	7^{7}
Alt	(France) Gleb Sakharov	4	4
7	(Australia) Bernard Tomic	6	6

Qualifying competition
(Bosnia and Herzegovina) Aldin Šetkić	7^{7}	7
7	(Australia) Bernard Tomic	6^{3}	5

==== Third qualifier ====
First round
3	(France) Quentin Halys	4	2
(France) Kenny de Schepper	6	6
(France) Mathias Bourgue	7^{7}	6
8	(Belgium) Arthur De Greef	6^{4}	3

Qualifying competition
(France) Kenny de Schepper	6	6
(France) Mathias Bourgue	4	4

==== Fourth qualifier ====
First round
4	(Greece) Stefanos Tsitsipas	6	6
WC	(Belgium) Zizou Bergs	0	3
(India) Ramkumar Ramanathan	5	4
6	(Austria) Sebastian Ofner	7	6

Qualifying competition
4	(Greece) Stefanos Tsitsipas	6^{7}	6	6
6	(Austria) Sebastian Ofner	7^{9}	4	4
