= 2022 European Open – Singles =

Singles
- 2022 European Open

Final
- Champion: (Canada) Félix Auger-Aliassime
- Runner-up: (United States) Sebastian Korda
- Score: 6–3, 6–4

Details
- Draw: 28
- Seeds: 8

Events
Singles	Doubles
← 2021 ·	European Open	· 2023 →

Félix Auger-Aliassime defeated Sebastian Korda in the final, 6–3, 6–4 to win the singles tennis title at the 2022 European Open. It was his second title in as many weeks and third career ATP Tour singles title overall.

Jannik Sinner was the reigning champion, but did not participate this year.

== Seeds ==
The top four seeds receive a bye into the second round.

1. (Poland) Hubert Hurkacz (quarterfinals)
2. (Canada) Félix Auger-Aliassime (champion)
3. (Argentina) Diego Schwartzman (second round)
4. Karen Khachanov (second round)
5. (United Kingdom) Dan Evans (quarterfinals)
6. (Argentina) Francisco Cerúndolo (second round)
7. (Netherlands) Botic van de Zandschulp (first round)
8. (Japan) Yoshihito Nishioka (quarterfinals)

== Draw ==
=== Key ===
- Q = Qualifier
- WC = Wild card
- LL = Lucky loser
- Alt = Alternate
- ITF = ITF entry
- PR = Protected ranking
- SR = Special ranking
- SE = Special exempt
- JE = Junior exempt
- JR = Junior Accelerator Programme entrant
- CO = College Accelerator Programme entrant
- NG = Next Gen Accelerator Program entrant
- w/o = Walkover
- r = Retired
- d = Defaulted

=== Finals ===
Semifinals
PR	(Austria) Dominic Thiem	7^{7}	3	6^{4}
(United States) Sebastian Korda	6^{4}	6	7^{7}
(France) Richard Gasquet	6^{2}	6^{3}
2	(Canada) Félix Auger-Aliassime	7^{7}	7^{7}

Final
(United States) Sebastian Korda	3	4
2	(Canada) Félix Auger-Aliassime	6	6

=== Top half ===
First round
(United Kingdom) J Draper	6	6
(United States) J Brooksby	1	2
WC	(Belgium) M Geerts	4	0
PR	(Austria) D Thiem	6	6
(Switzerland) M-A Hüsler	7	6^{3}	3
6	(Argentina) F Cerúndolo	5	7^{7}	6
(United States) M Giron	3	7^{7}	4
(United States) S Korda	6	6^{0}	6
Q	(Netherlands) T van Rijthoven	7^{9}	4	6^{4}
(Spain) J Munar	6^{7}	6	7^{7}
Q	(France) L Van Assche	7	2	6^{1}
8	(Japan) Y Nishioka	5	6	7^{7}

Second round
1	(Poland) H Hurkacz	7^{7}	6^{5}	6
(United Kingdom) J Draper	6^{5}	7^{7}	1
PR	(Austria) D Thiem	6	1	7
6	(Argentina) F Cerúndolo	1	6	5
4	K Khachanov	5	6^{9}
(United States) S Korda	7	7^{11}
(Spain) J Munar	1	6^{3}
8	(Japan) Y Nishioka	6	7^{7}

Quarterfinals
1	(Poland) H Hurkacz	6	6^{9}	6^{4}
PR	(Austria) D Thiem	3	7^{11}	7^{7}
(United States) S Korda	6	6
8	(Japan) Y Nishioka	0	2

Semifinals
PR	(Austria) D Thiem	7^{7}	3	6^{4}
(United States) S Korda	6^{4}	6	7^{7}

=== Bottom half ===
First round
7	(Netherlands) B van de Zandschulp	2	4
Q	(Switzerland) D Stricker	6	6
WC	(Switzerland) S Wawrinka	6	6^{4}	4
(France) R Gasquet	2	7^{7}	6
WC	(Belgium) G-A Bailly	6^{7}	7	4
(Belgium) D Goffin	7^{9}	5	6
5	(United Kingdom) D Evans	6	6
(Netherlands) T Griekspoor	3	4
(France) C Lestienne	6	6
Q	(Netherlands) J de Jong	3	4
LL	(France) M Guinard	3	6	7
LL	(France) G Blancaneaux	6	3	5

Second round
Q	(Switzerland) D Stricker	6^{6}	5
(France) R Gasquet	7^{8}	7
(Belgium) D Goffin	7^{7}	6
3	(Argentina) D Schwartzman	6^{3}	2
5	(United Kingdom) D Evans	6	6
(France) C Lestienne	2	1
LL	(France) M Guinard	3	3
2	(Canada) F Auger-Aliassime	6	6

Quarterfinals
(France) R Gasquet	6	7^{8}
(Belgium) D Goffin	2	6^{6}
5	(United Kingdom) D Evans	6	6^{4}	2
2	(Canada) F Auger-Aliassime	4	7^{7}	6

Semifinals
(France) R Gasquet	6^{2}	6^{3}
2	(Canada) F Auger-Aliassime	7^{7}	7^{7}

== Qualifying ==
=== Seeds ===
1. (Netherlands) Tim van Rijthoven (qualified)
2. (Switzerland) Dominic Stricker (qualified)
3. (France) Geoffrey Blancaneaux (qualifying competition, lucky loser)
4. (France) Manuel Guinard (qualifying competition, lucky loser)
5. (France) Evan Furness (first round)
6. (Netherlands) Jesper de Jong (qualified)
7. (Spain) Nicolás Álvarez Varona (qualifying competition, retired)
8. (France) Luca Van Assche (qualified)

=== Qualifiers ===
1. (Netherlands) Tim van Rijthoven
2. (Switzerland) Dominic Stricker
3. (France) Luca Van Assche
4. (Netherlands) Jesper de Jong

=== Lucky losers ===
1. (France) Manuel Guinard
2. (France) Geoffrey Blancaneaux

=== Qualifying draw ===
==== First qualifier ====
First round
1	(Netherlands) Tim van Rijthoven	6	7^{10}
(Kazakhstan) Denis Yevseyev	3	6^{8}
Alt	(Austria) Alexander Erler	6	6
5	(France) Evan Furness	1	4

Qualifying competition
1	(Netherlands) Tim van Rijthoven	7^{7}	6
Alt	(Austria) Alexander Erler	6^{3}	3

==== Second qualifier ====
First round
2	(Switzerland) Dominic Stricker	6	6
WC	(Belgium) Alexander Blockx	4	4
(Germany) Louis Wessels	4	4
7	(Spain) Nicolás Álvarez Varona	6	6

Qualifying competition
2	(Switzerland) Dominic Stricker	7^{11}	0
7	(Spain) Nicolás Álvarez Varona	6^{9}	0^{r}

==== Third qualifier ====
First round
3	(France) Geoffrey Blancaneaux	4	6	6
WC	(Belgium) Ruben Bemelmans	6	3	3
Alt	(Austria) Lucas Miedler	7^{7}	5	2
8	(France) Luca Van Assche	6^{2}	7	6

Qualifying competition
3	(France) Geoffrey Blancaneaux	6^{11}	6	2
8	(France) Luca Van Assche	7^{13}	4	6

==== Fourth qualifier ====
First round
4	(France) Manuel Guinard	6	6
(Slovakia) Filip Horanský	4	4
Alt	(Belgium) Yannick Mertens	3	6	1
6	(Netherlands) Jesper de Jong	6	3	6

Qualifying competition
4	(France) Manuel Guinard	6^{7}	2
6	(Netherlands) Jesper de Jong	7^{9}	6
