= 2026 European Open – Singles =

Singles
- 2026 European Open

Final
- Champion: (Netherlands) Tallon Griekspoor
- Runner-up: (Germany) Jan-Lennard Struff
- Score: 4–6, 6–3, 6–4
- Date: 25 October 2026

Details
- Draw: 28 (4 Q / 3 WC)
- Seeds: 8

Events
Singles	Doubles
- European Open

Tallon Griekspoor defeated Jan-Lennard Struff in the final, 4–6, 6–3, 6–4 to win the singles tennis title at the 2026 European Open. It was his fourth career ATP Tour title.

Félix Auger-Aliassime was the reigning champion, but withdrew before the tournament due to a knee injury.

This event marked the final professional appearance of former world No. 7 and 2017 ATP Finals runner-up David Goffin. He lost in the second round to Alex Michelsen.

== Seeds ==
The top four seeds received a bye into the second round.

1. (France) Arthur Fils (semifinals)
2. (Czech Republic) Jiří Lehečka (quarterfinals)
3. (Argentina) Francisco Cerúndolo (semifinals)
4. (Belgium) Alexander Blockx (withdrew)
5. (United States) Alex Michelsen (quarterfinals)
6. (Belgium) Zizou Bergs (quarterfinals)
7. (Netherlands) Botic van de Zandschulp (first round)
8. (Argentina) Mariano Navone (second round)

== Draw ==
Key

- Q = Qualifier
- WC = Wild card
- LL = Lucky loser
- Alt = Alternate
- ITF = ITF entry
- PR = Protected ranking
- SR = Special ranking
- SE = Special exempt
- JE = Junior exempt
- JR = Junior Accelerator Programme entrant
- CO = College Accelerator Programme entrant
- NG = Next Gen Accelerator Program entrant
- w/o = Walkover
- r = Retired
- d = Defaulted

=== Finals ===
Semifinals
1	(France) Arthur Fils	4	7^{9}	6^{5}
(Germany) Jan-Lennard Struff	6	6^{7}	7^{7}
3	(Argentina) Francisco Cerúndolo	6	3	6^{4}
(Netherlands) Tallon Griekspoor	2	6	7^{7}

Final
(Germany) Jan-Lennard Struff	6	3	4
(Netherlands) Tallon Griekspoor	4	6	6

=== Top half ===
First round
Q	(Italy) F Cinà	4	3
(Spain) J Munar	6	6
WC	(Belgium) D Goffin	3	6	6
LL	(Switzerland) R Bertola	6	3	4
Q	(Italy) A Guerrieri	1	2
5	(United States) A Michelsen	6	6
(Germany) J-L Struff	7^{7}	7^{7}
(United States) M Giron	6^{3}	6^{3}
(Croatia) D Prižmić	6^{5}	6	2
(Bosnia and Herzegovina) D Džumhur	7^{7}	2	6
(United Kingdom) T Samuel	3	6^{3}
6	(Belgium) Z Bergs	6	7^{7}

Second round
1	(France) A Fils	w/o
(Spain) J Munar
WC	(Belgium) D Goffin	3	4
5	(United States) A Michelsen	6	6
LL	(Belgium) G Onclin	4	2
(Germany) J-L Struff	6	6
(Bosnia and Herzegovina) D Džumhur	2	4
6	(Belgium) Z Bergs	6	6

Quarterfinals
1	(France) A Fils	6	7^{14}
5	(United States) A Michelsen	4	6^{12}
(Germany) J-L Struff	6	7^{8}
6	(Belgium) Z Bergs	3	6^{6}

Semifinals
1	(France) A Fils	4	7^{9}	6^{5}
(Germany) J-L Struff	6	6^{7}	7^{7}

=== Bottom half ===
First round
7	(Netherlands) B van de Zandschulp	1	4
Q	(France) C Chidekh	6	6
(United Kingdom) J Fearnley	6	6
(France) H Gaston	3	0
(Germany) Y Hanfmann	5	3
LL	(United States) M Damm	7	6
8	(Argentina) M Navone	7^{12}	6
(Argentina) JM Cerúndolo	6^{10}	2
(Netherlands) T Griekspoor	7^{7}	6^{5}	7
WC	(Germany) M Schönhaus	6^{3}	7^{7}	5
Q	(United States) N Basavareddy	6	3	4
(Belgium) R Collignon	3	6	6

Second round
Q	(France) C Chidekh	7^{7}	6
(United Kingdom) J Fearnley	6^{4}	2
LL	(United States) M Damm	4	6^{4}
3	(Argentina) F Cerúndolo	6	7^{7}
8	(Argentina) M Navone	6^{4}	5
(Netherlands) T Griekspoor	7^{7}	7
(Belgium) R Collignon	4	2
2	(Czech Republic) J Lehečka	6	6

Quarterfinals
Q	(France) C Chidekh	2	4
3	(Argentina) F Cerúndolo	6	6
(Netherlands) T Griekspoor	4	6	6
2	(Czech Republic) J Lehečka	6	4	3

Semifinals
3	(Argentina) F Cerúndolo	6	3	6^{4}
(Netherlands) T Griekspoor	2	6	7^{7}

== Qualifying ==
=== Seeds ===
1. (United States) Martin Damm (qualifying competition, lucky loser)
2. (France) Giovanni Mpetshi Perricard (first round)
3. (United States) Nishesh Basavareddy (qualified)
4. (France) Clément Chidekh (qualified)
5. (Italy) Federico Cinà (qualified)
6. (Germany) Tom Gentzsch (first round)
7. (Italy) Andrea Guerrieri (qualified)
8. (Belgium) Gauthier Onclin (qualifying competition, lucky loser)

=== Qualifiers ===
1. (Italy) Andrea Guerrieri
2. (Italy) Federico Cinà
3. (United States) Nishesh Basavareddy
4. (France) Clément Chidekh

=== Lucky losers ===
1. (Switzerland) Rémy Bertola
2. (United States) Martin Damm
3. (Belgium) Gauthier Onclin

=== Qualifying draw ===
==== First qualifier ====
First round
1	(United States) Martin Damm	6	6
WC	(Belgium) Buvaysar Gadamauri	1	4
(Belgium) Kimmer Coppejans	6^{2}	4
7	(Italy) Andrea Guerrieri	7^{7}	6

Qualifying competition
1	(United States) Martin Damm	6^{6}	7^{7}	3
7	(Italy) Andrea Guerrieri	7^{8}	6^{5}	6

==== Second qualifier ====
First round
2	(France) Giovanni Mpetshi Perricard	6^{4}	7^{7}	5
(Switzerland) Rémy Bertola	7^{7}	6^{2}	7
(Austria) Joel Schwärzler	3	6^{4}
5	(Italy) Federico Cinà	6	7^{7}

Qualifying competition
(Switzerland) Rémy Bertola	6	6^{6}	6^{4}
5	(Italy) Federico Cinà	3	7^{8}	7^{7}

==== Third qualifier ====
First round
3	(United States) Nishesh Basavareddy	6	6
(Lithuania) Edas Butvilas	2	1
PR	(Tunisia) Aziz Dougaz	6	2	7^{7}
6	(Germany) Tom Gentzsch	4	6	6^{0}

Qualifying competition
3	(United States) Nishesh Basavareddy	6	7
PR	(Tunisia) Aziz Dougaz	4	5

==== Fourth qualifier ====
First round
4	(France) Clément Chidekh	6	6
WC	(Belgium) Gilles Arnaud Bailly	1	3
(United Kingdom) Harry Wendelken	3	6	0
8	(Belgium) Gauthier Onclin	6	4	6

Qualifying competition
4	(France) Clément Chidekh	6	7^{7}
8	(Belgium) Gauthier Onclin	2	6^{3}
