= 2018 European Open – Doubles =

Doubles
- 2018 European Open

Final
- Champions: (France) Nicolas Mahut (France) Édouard Roger-Vasselin
- Runners-up: (Brazil) Marcelo Demoliner (Mexico) Santiago González
- Score: 6–4, 7–5

Events
Singles	Doubles
- European Open (tennis)

Scott Lipsky and Divij Sharan were the defending champions, but Lipsky chose not to participate. Sharan played alongside Artem Sitak, but lost in the semifinals to Nicolas Mahut and Édouard Roger-Vasselin.

Mahut and Roger-Vasselin went on to win the title, defeating Marcelo Demoliner and Santiago González in the final, 6–4, 7–5.

== Seeds ==
1. (Japan) Ben McLachlan / (Germany) Jan-Lennard Struff (first round)
2. (France) Nicolas Mahut / (France) Édouard Roger-Vasselin (champions)
3. (Netherlands) Robin Haase / (Netherlands) Matwé Middelkoop (quarterfinals)
4. (India) Divij Sharan / (New Zealand) Artem Sitak (semifinals)

== Draw ==
Key

- Q = Qualifier
- WC = Wild card
- LL = Lucky loser
- Alt = Alternate
- ITF = ITF entry
- PR = Protected ranking
- SR = Special ranking
- SE = Special exempt
- JE = Junior exempt
- JR = Junior Accelerator Programme entrant
- CO = College Accelerator Programme entrant
- NG = Next Gen Accelerator Program entrant
- w/o = Walkover
- r = Retired
- d = Defaulted

=== Draw ===
First round
1	(Japan) B McLachlan (Germany) J-L Struff	5	6	[11]
(Argentina) M González (Chile) N Jarry	7	2	[13]
(Brazil) M Demoliner (Mexico) S González	6	7^{7}
WC	(Belgium) R Bemelmans (Belgium) J De Loore	2	6^{3}
3	(Netherlands) R Haase (Netherlands) M Middelkoop	6^{5}	7^{7}	[13]
(Argentina) G Pella (Argentina) D Schwartzman	7^{7}	6^{5}	[11]
(Spain) D Marrero (Argentina) L Mayer	3	4
(Spain) G Granollers (Spain) M Granollers	6	6
(Netherlands) S Arends (Monaco) R Arneodo	3	7^{7}	[8]
(United States) M McDonald (United Kingdom) C Norrie	6	6^{5}	[10]
(India) L Paes (Mexico) MÁ Reyes-Varela	5	4
4	(India) D Sharan (New Zealand) A Sitak	7	6
(Spain) F López (Spain) J Munar	7^{8}	7^{7}
WC	(Belgium) S Gillé (Belgium) J Vliegen	6^{6}	6^{3}
(Germany) P Petzschner (United States) F Tiafoe	2	2
2	(France) N Mahut (France) É Roger-Vasselin	6	6

Quarterfinals
(Argentina) M González (Chile) N Jarry	0	7	[5]
(Brazil) M Demoliner (Mexico) S González	6	5	[10]
3	(Netherlands) R Haase (Netherlands) M Middelkoop	6	2	[4]
(Spain) G Granollers (Spain) M Granollers	2	6	[10]
(United States) M McDonald (United Kingdom) C Norrie	1	2
4	(India) D Sharan (New Zealand) A Sitak	6	6
(Spain) F López (Spain) J Munar	4	5
2	(France) N Mahut (France) É Roger-Vasselin	6	7

Semifinals
(Brazil) M Demoliner (Mexico) S González	6	6
(Spain) G Granollers (Spain) M Granollers	3	4
4	(India) D Sharan (New Zealand) A Sitak	5	6^{3}
2	(France) N Mahut (France) É Roger-Vasselin	7	7^{7}

Final
(Brazil) M Demoliner (Mexico) S González	4	5
2	(France) N Mahut (France) É Roger-Vasselin	6	7
