= 2025 European Open =

Men's indoor tennis tournament

- Date: 13–19 October
- Edition: 10th
- Category: ATP 250
- Draw: 28S / 16D
- Surface: Hard (indoor)
- Location: Brussels, Belgium
- Venue: ING Arena, Brussels Expo

Champions

Singles
- (Canada) Félix Auger-Aliassime

Doubles
- (United States) Christian Harrison / (United States) Evan King
- European Open

The 2025 European Open (also known as the BNP Paribas Fortis European Open for sponsorship reasons) was a men's tennis tournament played on indoor hard courts. It was the tenth edition of the European Open and an ATP 250 event on the 2025 ATP Tour. It took place at the Brussels Expo in Brussels, Belgium (moved this year from Antwerp), from 13 October until 19 October 2025.

== Champions ==
=== Singles ===
- (Canada) Félix Auger-Aliassime def. (Czech Republic) Jiří Lehečka, 7–6^{(7–2)}, 6–7^{(6–8)}, 6–2

=== Doubles ===
- (United States) Christian Harrison / (United States) Evan King def. (Monaco) Hugo Nys / (France) Édouard Roger-Vasselin, 7–6^{(12–10)}, 7–6^{(7–5)}

== Singles main-draw entrants ==
=== Seeds ===
Country	Player	Rank^{1}	Seed
ITA	Lorenzo Musetti	9	1
CAN	Félix Auger-Aliassime	13	2
CZE	Jiří Lehečka	19	3
ESP	Alejandro Davidovich Fokina	20	4
FRA	Giovanni Mpetshi Perricard	37	5
ARG	Sebastián Báez	42	6
BRA	João Fonseca	43	7
BEL	Zizou Bergs	44	8

- Rankings are as of 29 September 2025.

=== Other entrants ===
The following players received wildcards into the singles main draw:

- (Italy) Federico Cinà
- (Belgium) Raphaël Collignon
- (Belgium) David Goffin

The following player received entry using a protected ranking into the singles main draw:

- (Finland) Emil Ruusuvuori

The following players received entry from the qualifying draw:

- (Belgium) Gilles-Arnaud Bailly
- (Georgia (country)) Nikoloz Basilashvili
- (Germany) Yannick Hanfmann
- (United States) Eliot Spizzirri

The following player received entry as a lucky loser:

- (France) Valentin Royer

=== Withdrawals ===
- (Spain) Roberto Bautista Agut → replaced by (France) Valentin Royer
- (Portugal) Nuno Borges → replaced by (France) Quentin Halys
- (Spain) Jaume Munar → replaced by (Finland) Emil Ruusuvuori
- (France) Arthur Rinderknech → replaced by (Italy) Matteo Arnaldi
- (United States) Frances Tiafoe → replaced by (Bosnia and Herzegovina) Damir Džumhur

== Doubles main-draw entrants ==
=== Seeds ===
Country	Player	Country	Player	Rank^{1}	Seed
MON	Hugo Nys	FRA	Édouard Roger-Vasselin	35	1
USA	Christian Harrison	USA	Evan King	35	2
NED	Sander Arends	GBR	Luke Johnson	56	3
BRA	Rafael Matos	BRA	Marcelo Melo	98	4

- Rankings are as of 29 September 2025.

=== Other entrants ===
The following pairs received wildcards into the doubles main draw:

- (Belgium) Alexander Blockx / (Belgium) Tibo Colson
- (Belgium) Raphaël Collignon / (Belgium) David Goffin

The following pair received entry as alternates:

- (France) Grégoire Jacq / (France) Nicolas Mahut

=== Withdrawals ===
- (Belgium) Zizou Bergs / (United States) Marcos Giron → replaced by (France) Grégoire Jacq / (France) Nicolas Mahut
