= 2026 European Open – Doubles =

Doubles
- 2026 European Open

Final
- Champions: (Germany) Constantin Frantzen (United States) Robert Galloway
- Runners-up: (France) Sadio Doumbia (Netherlands) Bart Stevens
- Score: 6–7^{(4–7)}, 6–4, [10–8]
- Date: 25 October 2026

Events
Singles	Doubles
- European Open

Constantin Frantzen and Robert Galloway defeated Sadio Doumbia and Bart Stevens in the final, 6–7^{(4–7)}, 6–4, [10–8] to win the doubles tennis title at the 2026 European Open. Frantzen and Galloway won the title by playing only two matches, as their quarterfinal and semifinal opponents both withdrew.

Christian Harrison and Evan King were the reigning champions, but Harrison did not participate this year and King chose to compete in Almaty instead.

== Seeds ==
1. (Argentina) Guido Andreozzi / (France) Manuel Guinard (quarterfinals)
2. (Brazil) Orlando Luz / (Brazil) Rafael Matos (quarterfinals)
3. (Australia) Marc Polmans / (Poland) Jan Zieliński (first round)
4. (France) Sadio Doumbia / (Netherlands) Bart Stevens (final)

== Draw ==
Key

- Q = Qualifier
- WC = Wild card
- LL = Lucky loser
- Alt = Alternate
- ITF = ITF entry
- PR = Protected ranking
- SR = Special ranking
- SE = Special exempt
- JE = Junior exempt
- JR = Junior Accelerator Programme entrant
- CO = College Accelerator Programme entrant
- NG = Next Gen Accelerator Program entrant
- w/o = Walkover
- r = Retired
- d = Defaulted

=== Draw ===
First round
1	(Argentina) G Andreozzi (France) M Guinard	6	6
WC	(Belgium) M Geerts (Belgium) J Vliegen	4	4
(Colombia) N Barrientos (Netherlands) D Pel	4	7^{7}	[10]
(Brazil) M Melo (Australia) J-P Smith	6	6^{1}	[2]
4	(France) S Doumbia (Netherlands) B Stevens	6	7
(Argentina) M González (Argentina) A Molteni	4	5
(Netherlands) T Griekspoor (Netherlands) B van de Zandschulp	7^{7}	6
(Argentina) JM Cerúndolo (United States) B Kittay	6^{0}	3
(Czech Republic) P Nouza (New Zealand) M Venus	4	2
(Germany) C Frantzen (United States) R Galloway	6	6
WC	(Belgium) R Collignon (Belgium) D Goffin	6	7
3	(Australia) M Polmans (Poland) J Zieliński	4	5
(Argentina) F Cerúndolo (United States) A Michelsen	3	6	[10]
Alt	(Czech Republic) D Poljak (Czech Republic) M Vrbenský	6	3	[2]
(Netherlands) S Arends (United Kingdom) L Johnson	5	4
2	(Brazil) O Luz (Brazil) R Matos	7	6

Quarterfinals
1	(Argentina) G Andreozzi (France) M Guinard	6	5	[8]
(Colombia) N Barrientos (Netherlands) D Pel	2	7	[10]
4	(France) S Doumbia (Netherlands) B Stevens	w/o
(Netherlands) T Griekspoor (Netherlands) B van de Zandschulp
(Germany) C Frantzen (United States) R Galloway	^{w/o}
WC	(Belgium) R Collignon (Belgium) D Goffin
(Argentina) F Cerúndolo (United States) A Michelsen	6	7
2	(Brazil) O Luz (Brazil) R Matos	3	5

Semifinals
(Colombia) N Barrientos (Netherlands) D Pel	5	4
4	(France) S Doumbia (Netherlands) B Stevens	7	6
(Germany) C Frantzen (United States) R Galloway	w/o
(Argentina) F Cerúndolo (United States) A Michelsen

Final
4	(France) S Doumbia (Netherlands) B Stevens	7^{7}	4	[8]
(Germany) C Frantzen (United States) R Galloway	6^{4}	6	[10]
