= 2021 European Open – Doubles =

Tennis tournament

Doubles
- 2021 European Open

Final
- Champions: (France) Nicolas Mahut (France) Fabrice Martin
- Runners-up: (Netherlands) Wesley Koolhof (Netherlands) Jean-Julien Rojer
- Score: 6–0, 6–1

Events
Singles	Doubles
- European Open

John Peers and Michael Venus were the defending champions, but chose not to participate this year.

Nicolas Mahut and Fabrice Martin won the title, defeating Wesley Koolhof and Jean-Julien Rojer in the final, 6–0, 6–1.

== Seeds ==
1. (Croatia) Ivan Dodig / (Brazil) Marcelo Melo (quarterfinals)
2. (France) Nicolas Mahut / (France) Fabrice Martin (champions)
3. (Netherlands) Wesley Koolhof / (Netherlands) Jean-Julien Rojer (final)
4. (Belgium) Sander Gillé / (Belgium) Joran Vliegen (first round)

== Draw ==
Key

- Q = Qualifier
- WC = Wild card
- LL = Lucky loser
- Alt = Alternate
- ITF = ITF entry
- PR = Protected ranking
- SR = Special ranking
- SE = Special exempt
- JE = Junior exempt
- JR = Junior Accelerator Programme entrant
- CO = College Accelerator Programme entrant
- NG = Next Gen Accelerator Program entrant
- w/o = Walkover
- r = Retired
- d = Defaulted

=== Draw ===
First round
1	(Croatia) I Dodig (Brazil) M Melo	6	7^{7}
(Netherlands) D Pel (Netherlands) B van de Zandschulp	3	6^{4}
WC	(South Africa) L Harris (Belgium) X Malisse	6	7^{7}
(Monaco) R Arneodo (Australia) M Reid	4	6^{4}
3	(Netherlands) W Koolhof (Netherlands) J-J Rojer	6	6
(Czech Republic) R Jebavý (Belarus) A Vasilevski	4	2
(Italy) L Musetti (France) B Paire	6^{2}	7^{9}	[10]
(United States) N Monroe (United States) R Opelka	7^{7}	6^{7}	[8]
(Denmark) F Nielsen (Croatia) M Sabanov	4	4
(Ukraine) D Molchanov (Kazakhstan) A Nedovyesov	6	6
(Argentina) F Delbonis (Spain) D Vega Hernández	5	6	[11]
4	(Belgium) S Gillé (Belgium) J Vliegen	7	4	[9]
(Austria) O Marach (Austria) P Oswald	4	6	[10]
(Israel) J Erlich (Sweden) A Göransson	6	4	[6]
WC	(Belgium) R Bemelmans (Belgium) K Coppejans	3	2
2	(France) N Mahut (France) F Martin	6	6

Quarterfinals
1	(Croatia) I Dodig (Brazil) M Melo	4	6	[7]
WC	(South Africa) L Harris (Belgium) X Malisse	6	3	[10]
3	(Netherlands) W Koolhof (Netherlands) J-J Rojer	w/o
(Italy) L Musetti (France) B Paire
(Ukraine) D Molchanov (Kazakhstan) A Nedovyesov	6	0
(Argentina) F Delbonis (Spain) D Vega Hernández	3	0^{r}
(Austria) O Marach (Austria) P Oswald	6^{3}	4
2	(France) N Mahut (France) F Martin	7^{7}	6

Semifinals
WC	(South Africa) L Harris (Belgium) X Malisse	4	2
3	(Netherlands) W Koolhof (Netherlands) J-J Rojer	6	6
(Ukraine) D Molchanov (Kazakhstan) A Nedovyesov	6^{5}	2
2	(France) N Mahut (France) F Martin	7^{7}	6

Final
3	(Netherlands) W Koolhof (Netherlands) J-J Rojer	0	1
2	(France) N Mahut (France) F Martin	6	6
