= 2023 European Open – Singles =

Singles
- 2023 European Open

Final
- Champion: (Kazakhstan) Alexander Bublik
- Runner-up: (France) Arthur Fils
- Score: 6–4, 6–4

Details
- Draw: 28
- Seeds: 8

Events
Singles	Doubles
- European Open

Alexander Bublik defeated Arthur Fils in the final, 6–4, 6–4 to win the singles title at the 2023 European Open. It was his third ATP Tour singles title.

Félix Auger-Aliassime was the reigning champion, but chose to compete in Tokyo instead.

== Seeds ==
The top four seeds received a bye into the second round.

1. (Greece) Stefanos Tsitsipas (semifinals)
2. (Germany) Jan-Lennard Struff (second round)
3. (Kazakhstan) Alexander Bublik (champion)
4. (France) Arthur Fils (final)
5. (Germany) Yannick Hanfmann (quarterfinals)
6. (Spain) Roberto Carballés Baena (first round)
7. (France) Richard Gasquet (first round)
8. (Peru) Juan Pablo Varillas (quarterfinals)

== Draw ==
Key

- Q = Qualifier
- WC = Wild card
- LL = Lucky loser
- Alt = Alternate
- ITF = ITF entry
- PR = Protected ranking
- SR = Special ranking
- SE = Special exempt
- JE = Junior exempt
- JR = Junior Accelerator Programme entrant
- CO = College Accelerator Programme entrant
- NG = Next Gen Accelerator Program entrant
- w/o = Walkover
- r = Retired
- d = Defaulted

=== Finals ===
Semifinals
1	(Greece) Stefanos Tsitsipas	6^{5}	6^{4}
4	(France) Arthur Fils	7^{7}	7^{7}
3	(Kazakhstan) Alexander Bublik	6	6
Q	(Germany) Maximilian Marterer	4	4

Final
4	(France) Arthur Fils	4	4
3	(Kazakhstan) Alexander Bublik	6	6

=== Top half ===
First round
(Switzerland) D Stricker	7^{7}	3	3
(Netherlands) B van de Zandschulp	6^{4}	6	6
WC	(Italy) L Nardi	6	6^{7}	2
(Austria) D Thiem	3	7^{9}	6
Q	(Belgium) A Blockx	4	6^{3}
5	(Germany) Y Hanfmann	6	7^{7}
(Spain) J Munar	3	4
WC	(Estonia) M Lajal	6	6
Q	(France) B Bonzi	7^{7}	6^{5}	3
A Shevchenko	6^{5}	7^{7}	6
(Hungary) F Marozsán	6^{7}	4
8	(Peru) JP Varillas	7^{9}	6

Second round
1	(Greece) S Tsitsipas	7	6
(Netherlands) B van de Zandschulp	5	3
(Austria) D Thiem	4	7	4
5	(Germany) Y Hanfmann	6	5	6
4	(France) A Fils	7^{7}	7^{7}
WC	(Estonia) M Lajal	6^{4}	6^{2}
A Shevchenko	6	3	2
8	(Peru) JP Varillas	3	6	6

Quarterfinals
1	(Greece) S Tsitsipas	6	6
5	(Germany) Y Hanfmann	3	3
4	(France) A Fils	6	6
8	(Peru) JP Varillas	0	3

Semifinals
1	(Greece) S Tsitsipas	6^{5}	6^{4}
4	(France) A Fils	7^{7}	7^{7}

=== Bottom half ===
First round
6	(Spain) R Carballés Baena	6	3	6^{4}
Q	(France) G Mpetshi Perricard	0	6	7^{7}
WC	(Belgium) D Goffin	6	6
(France) Q Halys	4	1
(France) G Barrère	6	7^{7}
(Colombia) DE Galán	1	6^{5}
7	(France) R Gasquet	3	4
Q	(Germany) M Marterer	6	6
(Portugal) N Borges	7^{8}	6
(Germany) D Koepfer	6^{6}	4
(France) A Rinderknech	6^{7}	4
(France) H Gaston	7^{9}	6

Second round
Q	(France) G Mpetshi Perricard	7	6
WC	(Belgium) D Goffin	5	3
(France) G Barrère	4	2
3	(Kazakhstan) A Bublik	6	6
Q	(Germany) M Marterer	6	7^{7}
(Portugal) N Borges	3	6^{3}
(France) H Gaston	5	7^{7}	7^{13}
2	(Germany) J-L Struff	7	6^{5}	6^{11}

Quarterfinals
Q	(France) G Mpetshi Perricard	4	6	2
3	(Kazakhstan) A Bublik	6	4	6
Q	(Germany) M Marterer	6	6
(France) H Gaston	3	2

Semifinals
3	(Kazakhstan) A Bublik	6	6
Q	(Germany) M Marterer	4	4

== Qualifying ==
=== Seeds ===
1. (France) Benjamin Bonzi (qualified)
2. (Serbia) Hamad Medjedovic (first round)
3. (United States) Maxime Cressy (first round)
4. (Germany) Maximilian Marterer (qualified)
5. (Italy) Giulio Zeppieri (qualifying competition)
6. (Spain) Pablo Llamas Ruiz (first round)
7. (France) Antoine Escoffier (first round)
8. (France) Titouan Droguet (qualifying competition)

=== Qualifiers ===
1. (France) Benjamin Bonzi
2. (Belgium) Alexander Blockx
3. (France) Giovanni Mpetshi Perricard
4. (Germany) Maximilian Marterer

=== Qualifying draw ===
==== First qualifier ====
First round
1	(France) Benjamin Bonzi	6	6
(Germany) Oscar Otte	1	2
Alt	(France) Hugo Grenier	3	4
5	(Italy) Giulio Zeppieri	6	6

Qualifying competition
1	(France) Benjamin Bonzi	7	7
5	(Italy) Giulio Zeppieri	5	5

==== Second qualifier ====
First round
2	(Serbia) Hamad Medjedovic	6^{3}	2
WC	(Belgium) Alexander Blockx	7^{7}	6
WC	(Belgium) Gilles Arnaud Bailly	7^{7}	5	7^{7}
6	(Spain) Pablo Llamas Ruiz	6^{5}	7	6^{5}

Qualifying competition
WC	(Belgium) Alexander Blockx	6	7
WC	(Belgium) Gilles Arnaud Bailly	4	5

==== Third qualifier ====
First round
3	(United States) Maxime Cressy	2	6	6^{1}
(Belgium) Gauthier Onclin	6	1	7^{7}
Alt	(France) Giovanni Mpetshi Perricard	6	7^{7}
7	(France) Antoine Escoffier	1	6^{4}

Qualifying competition
(Belgium) Gauthier Onclin	4	2
Alt	(France) Giovanni Mpetshi Perricard	6	6

==== Fourth qualifier ====
First round
4	(Germany) Maximilian Marterer	6	6
(Netherlands) Gijs Brouwer	1	4
(Belgium) Zizou Bergs	5	7^{9}	2
8	(France) Titouan Droguet	7	6^{7}	6

Qualifying competition
4	(Germany) Maximilian Marterer	6	6
8	(France) Titouan Droguet	4	4
