= 2024 European Open – Singles =

Singles
- 2024 European Open

Final
- Champion: (Spain) Roberto Bautista Agut
- Runner-up: (Czech Republic) Jiří Lehečka
- Score: 7–5, 6–1

Details
- Draw: 28 (4 Q / 3 WC)
- Seeds: 8

Events
Singles	Doubles
- European Open

Roberto Bautista Agut defeated Jiří Lehečka in the final, 7–5, 6–1 to win the singles tennis title at the 2024 European Open. It was his 12th ATP Tour title. Aged 36 years and six months, Bautista Agut became the oldest quarterfinalist, semifinalist, and champion in the tournament's history.

Alexander Bublik was the reigning champion, but did not participate this year.

== Seeds ==
The top four seeds received a bye into the second round.

1. (Australia) Alex de Minaur (quarterfinals)
2. (Greece) Stefanos Tsitsipas (quarterfinals)
3. (Canada) Félix Auger-Aliassime (quarterfinals)
4. (Argentina) Sebastián Báez (second round)
5. (Czech Republic) Jiří Lehečka (final)
6. (Argentina) Tomás Martín Etcheverry (second round)
7. (Argentina) Mariano Navone (second round)
8. (United States) Marcos Giron (semifinals)

== Draw ==
Key

- Q = Qualifier
- WC = Wild card
- LL = Lucky loser
- Alt = Alternate
- ITF = ITF entry
- PR = Protected ranking
- SR = Special ranking
- SE = Special exempt
- JE = Junior exempt
- JR = Junior Accelerator Programme entrant
- CO = College Accelerator Programme entrant
- NG = Next Gen Accelerator Program entrant
- w/o = Walkover
- r = Retired
- d = Defaulted

=== Finals ===
Semifinals
(France) Hugo Gaston	3	4
(Spain) Roberto Bautista Agut	6	6
8	(United States) Marcos Giron	3	6	2
5	(Czech Republic) Jiří Lehečka	6	4	6

Final
(Spain) Roberto Bautista Agut	7	6
5	(Czech Republic) Jiří Lehečka	5	1

=== Top half ===
First round
(Germany) D Koepfer	4	0
(Spain) R Carballés Baena	6	6
Q	A Vatutin	6	3	3
(France) H Gaston	3	6	6
(Brazil) T Monteiro	3	6	6^{6}
7	(Argentina) M Navone	6	4	7^{8}
WC	(Belgium) R Collignon	2	0
(Hungary) M Fucsovics	6	6
Q	(France) L Van Assche	2	1
(Spain) R Bautista Agut	6	6
WC	(France) R Gasquet	6^{4}	4
6	(Argentina) TM Etcheverry	7^{7}	6

Second round
1	(Australia) A de Minaur	2	6	6
(Spain) R Carballés Baena	6	4	2
(France) H Gaston	6	6^{3}	7^{7}
7	(Argentina) M Navone	4	7^{7}	6^{4}
3	(Canada) F Auger-Aliassime	6^{4}	6	6
(Hungary) M Fucsovics	7^{7}	4	2
(Spain) R Bautista Agut	7^{7}	6
6	(Argentina) TM Etcheverry	6^{2}	4

Quarterfinals
1	(Australia) A de Minaur	3	6	5
(France) H Gaston	6	3	7
3	(Canada) F Auger-Aliassime	6	2	6^{6}
(Spain) R Bautista Agut	3	6	7^{8}

Semifinals
(France) H Gaston	3	4
(Spain) R Bautista Agut	6	6

=== Bottom half ===
First round
8	(United States) M Giron	6	6
(Netherlands) B van de Zandschulp	4	1
(France) A Rinderknech	6	6
WC	(Belgium) A Blockx	3	1
(Argentina) F Díaz Acosta	5	4
(Belgium) Z Bergs	7	6
5	(Czech Republic) J Lehečka	6	6
(Spain) J Munar	1	4
Q	(Belgium) G-A Bailly	4	3
(Germany) D Altmaier	6	6
(France) G Mpetshi Perricard	6^{4}	3
Q	(Brazil) T Seyboth Wild	7^{7}	6

Second round
8	(United States) M Giron	7^{8}	7^{7}
(France) A Rinderknech	6^{6}	6^{4}
(Belgium) Z Bergs	6	6
4	(Argentina) S Báez	3	4
5	(Czech Republic) J Lehečka	6	6
(Germany) D Altmaier	4	3
Q	(Brazil) T Seyboth Wild	6^{5}	6	5
2	(Greece) S Tsitsipas	7^{7}	4	7

Quarterfinals
8	(United States) M Giron	6	6
(Belgium) Z Bergs	2	2
5	(Czech Republic) J Lehečka	6	6
2	(Greece) S Tsitsipas	4	4

Semifinals
8	(United States) M Giron	3	6	2
5	(Czech Republic) J Lehečka	6	4	6

== Qualifying ==
=== Seeds ===
1. (Germany) Yannick Hanfmann (first round)
2. (Brazil) Thiago Seyboth Wild (qualified)
3. (France) Luca Van Assche (qualified)
4. (France) Pierre-Hugues Herbert (first round)
5. (Germany) Henri Squire (withdrew)
6. (Estonia) Mark Lajal (qualifying competition)
7. (Romania) Filip Cristian Jianu (first round)
8. (France) Manuel Guinard (qualifying competition)

=== Qualifiers ===
1. Alexey Vatutin
2. (Brazil) Thiago Seyboth Wild
3. (France) Luca Van Assche
4. (Belgium) Gilles-Arnaud Bailly

=== Qualifying draw ===
==== First qualifier ====
First round
1	(Germany) Yannick Hanfmann	4	2
Alexey Vatutin	6	6
(Belgium) Michael Geerts	6^{4}	4
8	(France) Manuel Guinard	7^{7}	6

Qualifying competition
Alexey Vatutin	6	3	7
8	(France) Manuel Guinard	4	6	5

==== Second qualifier ====
First round
2	(Brazil) Thiago Seyboth Wild	5	7^{7}	6
WC	(Belgium) Émilien Demanet	7	6^{5}	4
(Spain) Miguel Damas	2	0
6	(Estonia) Mark Lajal	6	6

Qualifying competition
2	(Brazil) Thiago Seyboth Wild	6	6
6	(Estonia) Mark Lajal	2	3

==== Third qualifier ====
First round
3	(France) Luca Van Assche	6	6
(Netherlands) Jelle Sels	2	4
(Spain) Àlex Martí Pujolràs	6	7
7	(Romania) Filip Cristian Jianu	4	5

Qualifying competition
3	(France) Luca Van Assche	6	6
(Spain) Àlex Martí Pujolràs	0	4

==== Fourth qualifier ====
First round
4	(France) Pierre-Hugues Herbert	6^{7}	3
WC	(Belgium) Gilles-Arnaud Bailly	7^{9}	6
(Georgia (country)) Nikoloz Basilashvili	6	6
Alt	(Germany) Tim Pütz	2	2

Qualifying competition
WC	(Belgium) Gilles-Arnaud Bailly	7^{7}	6
(Georgia (country)) Nikoloz Basilashvili	6^{4}	1
