= 2024 European Open – Doubles =

Doubles
- 2024 European Open

Final
- Champions: (Austria) Alexander Erler (Austria) Lucas Miedler
- Runners-up: (United States) Robert Galloway (Kazakhstan) Aleksandr Nedovyesov
- Score: 6–4, 1–6, [10–8]

Events
| Singles | Doubles |
- European Open

Alexander Erler and Lucas Miedler won the doubles title at the 2024 European Open, defeating Robert Galloway and Aleksandr Nedovyesov in the final, 6–4, 1–6, [10–8].

Petros and Stefanos Tsitsipas were the defending champions, but lost in the first round to Robin Haase and David Pel.

== Seeds ==
1. (Germany) Kevin Krawietz / (Germany) Tim Pütz (first round, retired)
2. (Mexico) Santiago González / (France) Édouard Roger-Vasselin (quarterfinals)
3. (Belgium) Sander Gillé / (Belgium) Joran Vliegen (quarterfinals)
4. (Croatia) Ivan Dodig / (Czech Republic) Adam Pavlásek (quarterfinals)

== Draw ==
Key

- Q = Qualifier
- WC = Wild card
- LL = Lucky loser
- Alt = Alternate
- ITF = ITF entry
- PR = Protected ranking
- SR = Special ranking
- SE = Special exempt
- JE = Junior exempt
- JR = Junior Accelerator Programme entrant
- CO = College Accelerator Programme entrant
- NG = Next Gen Accelerator Program entrant
- w/o = Walkover
- r = Retired
- d = Defaulted

=== Draw ===
First round
1 | (Germany) K Krawietz (Germany) T Pütz | 6 | 0^{r}
(Netherlands) M Middelkoop (Argentina) A Molteni | 1 | 2
PR | (Netherlands) R Haase (Netherlands) D Pel | 6 | 6
(Greece) Pe Tsitsipas (Greece) S Tsitsipas | 3 | 4
4 | (Croatia) I Dodig (Czech Republic) A Pavlásek | 7^{7} | 6
WC | (Belgium) A Blockx (Belgium) R Collignon | 6^{3} | 4
(United Kingdom) J Murray (Australia) J Peers | 5 | 7^{7} | [12]
(United States) R Galloway (Kazakhstan) A Nedovyesov | 7 | 6^{4} | [14]
(Austria) A Erler (Austria) L Miedler | 7^{7} | 7
(Germany) C Frantzen (Germany) H Jebens | 6^{4} | 5
(France) M Guinard (France) G Jacq | 6 | 3 | [11]
3 | (Belgium) S Gillé (Belgium) J Vliegen | 4 | 6 | [13]
(Netherlands) S Arends (United Kingdom) L Johnson | 6 | 6
WC | (Belgium) M Geerts (Germany) Y Hanfmann | 3 | 2
(Spain) R Carballés Baena (Argentina) M Navone | 1 | 5
2 | (Mexico) S González (France) É Roger-Vasselin | 6 | 7

Quarterfinals
(Netherlands) M Middelkoop (Argentina) A Molteni | 6 | 3 | [8]
PR | (Netherlands) R Haase (Netherlands) D Pel | 3 | 6 | [10]
4 | (Croatia) I Dodig (Czech Republic) A Pavlásek | 6 | 3 | [5]
(United States) R Galloway (Kazakhstan) A Nedovyesov | 3 | 6 | [10]
(Austria) A Erler (Austria) L Miedler | 7^{10} | 6
3 | (Belgium) S Gillé (Belgium) J Vliegen | 6^{8} | 3
(Netherlands) S Arends (United Kingdom) L Johnson | 2 | 6 | [10]
2 | (Mexico) S González (France) É Roger-Vasselin | 6 | 3 | [8]

Semifinals
PR | (Netherlands) R Haase (Netherlands) D Pel | 2 | 3
(United States) R Galloway (Kazakhstan) A Nedovyesov | 6 | 6
(Austria) A Erler (Austria) L Miedler | 6 | 1 | [10]
(Netherlands) S Arends (United Kingdom) L Johnson | 4 | 6 | [6]

Final
(United States) R Galloway (Kazakhstan) A Nedovyesov | 4 | 6 | [8]
(Austria) A Erler (Austria) L Miedler | 6 | 1 | [10]
