= 2026 European Open =

Men's indoor tennis tournament

- Date: 19–25 October
- Edition: 11th
- Category: ATP 250
- Draw: 28S / 16D
- Surface: Hard (indoor)
- Location: Brussels, Belgium
- Venue: ING Arena, Brussels Expo

Champions

Singles
- (Netherlands) Tallon Griekspoor

Doubles
- (Germany) Constantin Frantzen / (United States) Robert Galloway
- European Open

The 2026 European Open (also known as the BNP Paribas Fortis European Open for sponsorship reasons) is a men's tennis tournament to be played on indoor hard courts. It will be the eleventh edition of the European Open and an ATP 250 event on the 2026 ATP Tour. It will take place at the Brussels Expo in Brussels, Belgium from 19 October until 25 October 2026.

== Champions ==
=== Singles ===
- (Netherlands) Tallon Griekspoor def. (Germany) Jan-Lennard Struff, 4–6, 6–3, 6–4

=== Doubles ===
- (Germany) Constantin Frantzen / (United States) Robert Galloway def. (France) Sadio Doumbia / (Netherlands) Bart Stevens, 6–7^{(4–7)}, 6–4, [10–8]

== Singles main-draw entrants ==
=== Seeds ===
| Country | Player | Rank^{1} | Seed |
|---|---|---|---|
| FRA | Arthur Fils | 11 | 1 |
| CZE | Jiří Lehečka | 16 | 2 |
| ARG | Francisco Cerúndolo | 20 | 3 |
| ~~BEL~~ | ~~Alexander Blockx~~ | ~~28~~ | ~~4~~ |
| USA | Alex Michelsen | 35 | 5 |
| BEL | Zizou Bergs | 39 | 6 |
| NED | Botic van de Zandschulp | 41 | 7 |
| ARG | Mariano Navone | 47 | 8 |

- Rankings are as of 5 October 2026.

=== Other entrants ===
The following players received wildcards into the singles main draw:

- (Belgium) David Goffin
- ~~(Denmark) Holger Rune~~
- (Germany) Max Schönhaus

The following players received entry from the qualifying draw:

- (United States) Nishesh Basavareddy
- (France) Clément Chidekh
- (Italy) Federico Cinà
- (Italy) Andrea Guerrieri

The following players received entry as lucky losers:

- (Switzerland) Rémy Bertola
- (United States) Martin Damm
- (Belgium) Gauthier Onclin

=== Withdrawals ===
- (Canada) Félix Auger-Aliassime → replaced by (United Kingdom) Toby Samuel
- (Belgium) Alexander Blockx → replaced by (Belgium) Gauthier Onclin
- (Argentina) Román Andrés Burruchaga → replaced by (Spain) Jaume Munar
- (Spain) Alejandro Davidovich Fokina → replaced by (France) Hugo Gaston
- (France) Quentin Halys → replaced by (Germany) Jan-Lennard Struff
- (Denmark) Holger Rune → replaced by (United States) Martin Damm
- (Norway) Casper Ruud → replaced by (Croatia) Dino Prižmić
- (Paraguay) Adolfo Daniel Vallejo → replaced by (Switzerland) Rémy Bertola

== Doubles main-draw entrants ==
=== Seeds ===
| Country | Player | Country | Player | Rank^{1} | Seed |
|---|---|---|---|---|---|
| ARG | Guido Andreozzi | FRA | Manuel Guinard | 31 | 1 |
| BRA | Orlando Luz | BRA | Rafael Matos | 35 | 2 |
| AUS | Marc Polmans | POL | Jan Zieliński | 58 | 3 |
| FRA | Sadio Doumbia | NED | Bart Stevens | 75 | 4 |

- Rankings are as of 5 October 2026.

=== Other entrants ===
The following pairs received wildcards into the doubles main draw:

- (Belgium) Raphaël Collignon / (Belgium) David Goffin
- (Belgium) Michael Geerts / (Belgium) Joran Vliegen

The following pair received entry as alternates:

- (Czech Republic) David Poljak / (Czech Republic) Michael Vrbenský

=== Withdrawals ===
- (Belgium) Zizou Bergs / (Belgium) Alexander Blockx → replaced by (Czech Republic) David Poljak / (Czech Republic) Michael Vrbenský
