= Arnaud Bovy =

Belgian tennis player (born 2000)

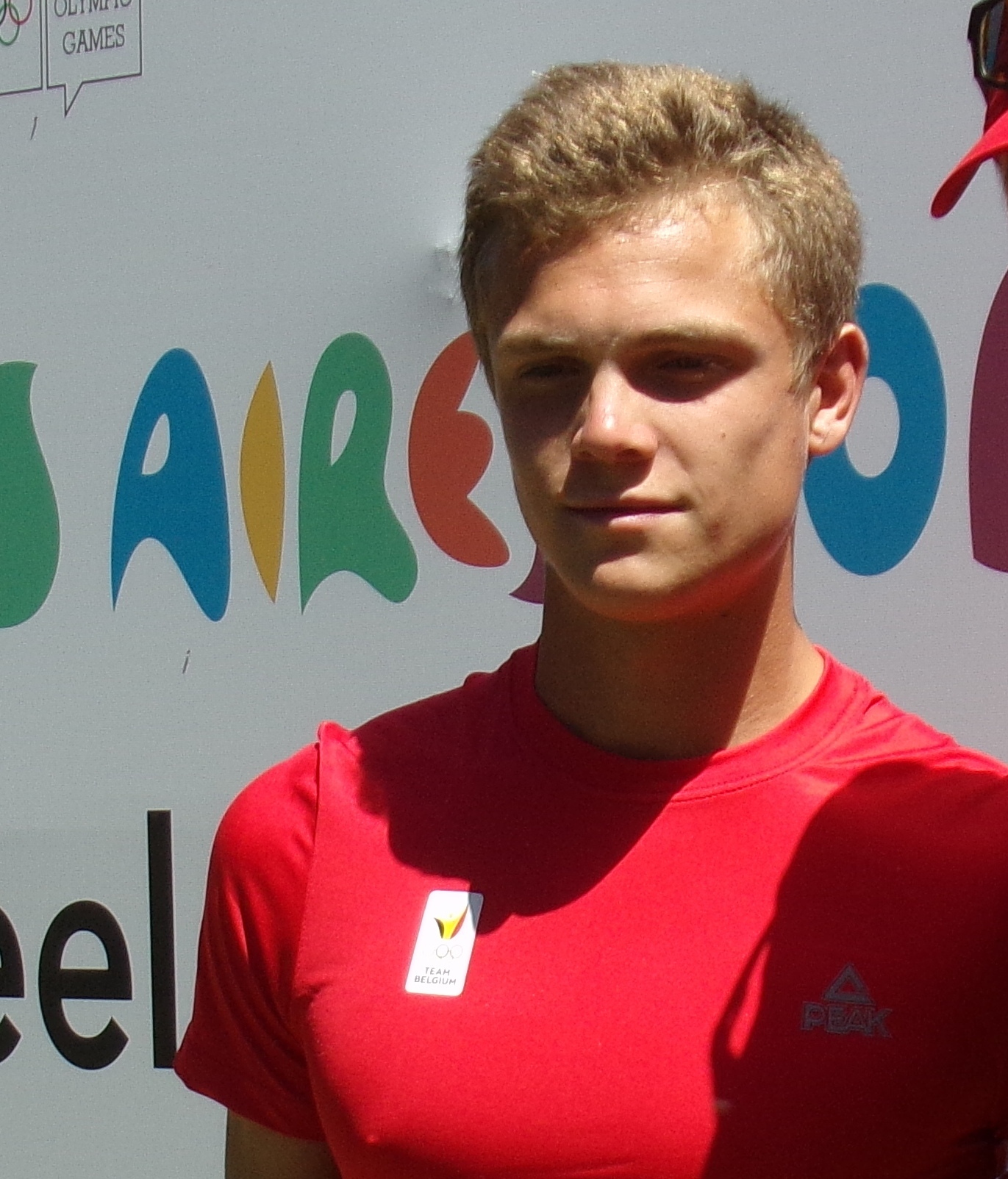
- Bovy at the 2018 Summer Youth Olympics
- Country (sports): Belgium
- Born: 17 September 2000 (age 25) Liège, Belgium
- Retired: 2022
- Plays: Left-handed
- Prize money: US $38,549

Singles
- Career record: 0–0 (at ATP Tour level, Grand Slam level, and in Davis Cup)
- Career titles: 0
- Highest ranking: No. 570 (13 January 2020)

Doubles
- Career record: 0–1 (at ATP Tour level, Grand Slam level, and in Davis Cup)
- Career titles: 0
- Highest ranking: No. 572 (10 February 2020)
- Last updated on: 21 August 2023.

Arnaud Bovy (born 17 September 2000) is a former Belgian tennis player.

Bovy had a career high ATP singles ranking of No. 570 achieved on 13 January 2020. He also had a career high ATP doubles ranking of No. 572 achieved on 14 February 2020. He retired from professional tennis in August 2022.

Bovy made his ATP main draw debut at the 2019 European Open after receiving a wildcard for the doubles main draw partnering Steve Darcis.

== ITF World Tennis Tour finals ==
=== Singles: 4 (1 title, 3 runner-ups) ===
Legend ITF WTT (1–3)	Finals by surface Hard (1–2) Clay (0–1) Grass (0–0) Carpet (0–0)

Result	W–L	Date	Tournament	Tier	Surface	Opponent	Score
Loss	0–1	Jun 2019	M15 Irpin, Ukraine	WTT	Clay	(Kazakhstan) Denis Yevseyev	1–6, 3–6
Win	1–1	Nov 2019	M15 Monastir, Tunisia	WTT	Hard	(Ukraine) Georgii Kravchenkko	6–1, 3–6, 6–3
Loss	1–2	Feb 2021	M15 Sharm El Sheikh, Egypt	WTT	Hard	(Chinese Taipei) Hsu Yu-hsiou	4–6, 4–6
Loss	1–3	Mar 2022	M15 Monastir, Tunisia	WTT	Hard	(Tunisia) Skander Mansouri	5–7, 6–4, 0–6

=== Doubles: 5 (5 runner-ups) ===
Legend ITF WTT (0–5)	Finals by surface Hard (0–4) Clay (0–1) Grass (0–0) Carpet (0–0)

Result	W–L	Date	Tournament	Tier	Surface	Partner	Opponents	Score
Loss	0–1	Mar 2019	M15 Doha, Qatar	WTT	Hard	(Netherlands) Jesper de Jong	(Belgium) Zizou Bergs (France) Geoffrey Blancaneaux	2–6, 4–6
Loss	0–2	Mar 2019	M15 Doha, Qatar	WTT	Hard	(Germany) Dominik Boehler	(Netherlands) Jesper de Jong (Netherlands) Michiel de Krom	3–6, 3–6
Loss	0–3	Aug 2019	M15 Koksijde, Belgium	WTT	Clay	(Belgium) Romain Barbosa	(Belgium) Zizou Bergs (France) Dan Added	4–6, 6–3, [3–10]
Loss	0–4	Feb 2020	M15 Monastir, Tunisia	WTT	Hard	(Belgium) Gauthier Onclin	(Romania) Adrian Barbu (Tunisia) Aziz Dougaz	4–6, 4–6
Loss	0–5	Feb 2021	M15 Sharm El Sheikh	WTT	Hard	(United Kingdom) Aidan McHugh	(Dominican Republic) Nick Hardt (United States) Nicolas Moreno de Alboran	3–6, 4–6
