= European Open (tennis) =

- 2026 European Open

ATP Tour
- Event name: European Open
- Tour: ATP Tour (since 2016)
- Founded: 2016; 10 years ago
- Location: Antwerp (2016–2024); Brussels (2025–); Belgium
- Venue: Lotto Arena (2016–2024); Brussels Expo: ING Arena (2025–)
- Category: ATP 250 series
- Surface: Hard (indoor)
- Draw: 28S / 16Q / 16D
- Prize money: €706,850 (2025)
- Website: europeanopen.be
- Notes: Tournament director: Dick Norman (since 2018)

Current champions (2025)
- Singles: (Netherlands) Tallon Griekspoor
- Doubles: (Germany) Constantin Frantzen (United States) Robert Galloway

The BNP Paribas Fortis European Open (sponsored by BNP Paribas Fortis) is an ATP Tour 250 tennis tournament that takes place in Brussels, Belgium (since 2025). It was introduced for the 2016 ATP World Tour. The tournament took place in Antwerp from 2016 to 2024.

== Past finals ==
=== Singles ===
Year	Champions	Runners-up	Score
↓ Antwerp ↓
2016	(France) Richard Gasquet	(Argentina) Diego Schwartzman	7−6^{(7−4)}, 6−1
2017	(France) Jo-Wilfried Tsonga	(Argentina) Diego Schwartzman	6−3, 7−5
2018	(United Kingdom) Kyle Edmund	(France) Gaël Monfils	3–6, 7–6^{(7–2)}, 7–6^{(7–4)}
2019	(United Kingdom) Andy Murray	(Switzerland) Stan Wawrinka	3–6, 6–4, 6–4
2020	(France) Ugo Humbert	(Australia) Alex de Minaur	6–1, 7–6^{(7–4)}
2021	(Italy) Jannik Sinner	(Argentina) Diego Schwartzman	6−2, 6−2
2022	(Canada) Félix Auger-Aliassime	(United States) Sebastian Korda	6−3, 6−4
2023	(Kazakhstan) Alexander Bublik	(France) Arthur Fils	6−4, 6−4
2024	(Spain) Roberto Bautista Agut	(Czech Republic) Jiří Lehečka	7−5, 6−1
↓ Brussels ↓
2025	(Canada) Félix Auger-Aliassime (2)	(Czech Republic) Jiří Lehečka	7–6^{(7–2)}, 6–7^{(6–8)}, 6–2
2026	(Netherlands) Tallon Griekspoor	(Germany) Jan-Lennard Struff	4–6, 6–3, 6–4

=== Doubles ===
Year	Champions	Runners-up	Score
↓ Antwerp ↓
2016	(Canada) Daniel Nestor (France) Édouard Roger-Vasselin	(France) Pierre-Hugues Herbert (France) Nicolas Mahut	6–4, 6–4
2017	(United States) Scott Lipsky (India) Divij Sharan	(Mexico) Santiago González (Chile) Julio Peralta	6–4, 2–6, [10–5]
2018	(France) Nicolas Mahut (France) Édouard Roger-Vasselin (2)	(Brazil) Marcelo Demoliner (Mexico) Santiago González	6–4, 7–5
2019	(Germany) Kevin Krawietz (Germany) Andreas Mies	(United States) Rajeev Ram (United Kingdom) Joe Salisbury	7–6^{(7–1)}, 6–3
2020	(Australia) John Peers (New Zealand) Michael Venus	(India) Rohan Bopanna (Netherlands) Matwé Middelkoop	6–3, 6–4
2021	(France) Nicolas Mahut (2) (France) Fabrice Martin	(Netherlands) Wesley Koolhof (Netherlands) Jean-Julien Rojer	6–0, 6–1
2022	(Netherlands) Tallon Griekspoor (Netherlands) Botic van de Zandschulp	(India) Rohan Bopanna (Netherlands) Matwé Middelkoop	3–6, 6–3, [10–5]
2023	(Greece) Petros Tsitsipas (Greece) Stefanos Tsitsipas	(Uruguay) Ariel Behar (Czech Republic) Adam Pavlásek	6–7^{(5–7)}, 6–4, [10–8]
2024	(Austria) Alexander Erler (Austria) Lucas Miedler	(United States) Robert Galloway (Kazakhstan) Aleksandr Nedovyesov	6–4, 1–6, [10–8]
↓ Brussels ↓
2025	(United States) Christian Harrison (United States) Evan King	(Monaco) Hugo Nys (France) Édouard Roger-Vasselin	7–6^{(10–8)}, 7–6^{(7–5)}
2026	(Germany) Constantin Frantzen (United States) Robert Galloway	(France) Sadio Doumbia (Netherlands) Bart Stevens	6–7^{(4–7)}, 6–4, [10–8]

== See also ==
- ECC Antwerp
