= 2017 Croatia Open Umag – Doubles =

Doubles
- 2017 Croatia Open Umag
- 2016 Champions: (Slovakia) Martin Kližan (Spain) David Marrero

Final
- Champions: (Argentina) Guillermo Durán (Argentina) Andrés Molteni
- Runners-up: (Croatia) Marin Draganja (Croatia) Tomislav Draganja
- Score: 6–3, 6–7^{(4–7)}, [10–6]

Details
- Draw: 16
- Seeds: 4

Events
Singles	Doubles
← 2016 ·	Croatia Open	· 2018 →

Martin Kližan and David Marrero were the defending champions, but Kližan chose not to participate this year and Marrero chose to compete in Båstad instead.

Guillermo Durán and Andrés Molteni won the title, defeating Marin and Tomislav Draganja in the final, 6–3, 6–7^{(4–7)}, [10–6].

== Seeds ==
1. (Belarus) Max Mirnyi / (Canada) Daniel Nestor (semifinals)
2. (Croatia) Ivan Dodig / (Croatia) Franko Škugor (quarterfinals)
3. (Argentina) Guillermo Durán / (Argentina) Andrés Molteni (champions)
4. (United States) James Cerretani / (United States) Max Schnur (first round)

== Draw ==
=== Key ===
- Q = Qualifier
- WC = Wild card
- LL = Lucky loser
- Alt = Alternate
- ITF = ITF entry
- PR = Protected ranking
- SR = Special ranking
- SE = Special exempt
- JE = Junior exempt
- JR = Junior Accelerator Programme entrant
- CO = College Accelerator Programme entrant
- NG = Next Gen Accelerator Program entrant
- w/o = Walkover
- r = Retired
- d = Defaulted

=== Draw ===
First round
1	(Belarus) M Mirnyi (Canada) D Nestor	7^{7}	6
(Belarus) A Bury (Bosnia and Herzegovina) D Džumhur	6^{2}	0
(Russia) M Elgin (Uzbekistan) D Istomin	7	4	[10]
(Croatia) D Marcan (Croatia) A Šančić	5	6	[6]
3	(Argentina) G Durán (Argentina) A Molteni	w/o
WC	(Croatia) B Ćorić (Croatia) N Serdarušić
(Australia) M Polmans (France) G Simon	w/o
(Argentina) C Berlocq (Portugal) J Sousa
(Italy) M Cecchinato (Russia) A Rublev	5	1
(Brazil) R Dutra Silva (Italy) P Lorenzi	7	6
(United Kingdom) A Bedene (United Kingdom) D Inglot	7^{7}	0	[13]
4	(United States) J Cerretani (United States) M Schnur	6^{5}	6	[11]
(Italy) F Fognini (Italy) A Giannessi	6	6^{6}	[4]
WC	(Croatia) M Draganja (Croatia) T Draganja	3	7^{8}	[10]
(Czech Republic) R Jebavý (Czech Republic) J Veselý	2	6	[7]
2	(Croatia) I Dodig (Croatia) F Škugor	6	4	[10]

Quarterfinals
1	(Belarus) M Mirnyi (Canada) D Nestor	6	6
(Russia) M Elgin (Uzbekistan) D Istomin	4	3
3	(Argentina) G Durán (Argentina) A Molteni	6	6
(Australia) M Polmans (France) G Simon	3	4
(Brazil) R Dutra Silva (Italy) P Lorenzi	5	3
(United Kingdom) A Bedene (United Kingdom) D Inglot	7	6
WC	(Croatia) M Draganja (Croatia) T Draganja	7^{8}	4	[11]
2	(Croatia) I Dodig (Croatia) F Škugor	6^{6}	6	[9]

Semifinals
1	(Belarus) M Mirnyi (Canada) D Nestor	5	6	[6]
3	(Argentina) G Durán (Argentina) A Molteni	7	3	[10]
(United Kingdom) A Bedene (United Kingdom) D Inglot	7^{8}	5	[10]
WC	(Croatia) M Draganja (Croatia) T Draganja	6^{6}	7	[12]

Final
3	(Argentina) G Durán (Argentina) A Molteni	6	6^{4}	[10]
WC	(Croatia) M Draganja (Croatia) T Draganja	3	7^{7}	[6]
