= 2017 Croatia Open Umag – Singles =

Tennis tournament – men's singles

Singles
- 2017 Croatia Open Umag

Final
- Champion: (Russia) Andrey Rublev
- Runner-up: (Italy) Paolo Lorenzi
- Score: 6–4, 6–2

Details
- Draw: 28 (4 Q / 3 WC )
- Seeds: 8

Events
Singles	Doubles
- Croatia Open

Fabio Fognini was the defending champion, but lost in the quarterfinals to lucky loser Andrey Rublev.

Rublev went on to win his first ATP World Tour title, defeating Paolo Lorenzi in the final, 6–4, 6–2. He was the seventh lucky loser in ATP history to win a tour-level title and the first to do so since Rajeev Ram at 2009 Newport.

== Seeds ==
The top four seeds receive a bye into the second round.

1. (Belgium) David Goffin (quarterfinals)
2. (France) Gaël Monfils (second round)
3. (Italy) Fabio Fognini (quarterfinals)
4. (Italy) Paolo Lorenzi (final)
5. (France) Gilles Simon (first round)
6. (Croatia) Borna Ćorić (withdrew)
7. (France) Benoît Paire (first round)
8. (Czech Republic) Jiří Veselý (quarterfinals)

== Draw ==
Key

- Q = Qualifier
- WC = Wild card
- LL = Lucky loser
- Alt = Alternate
- ITF = ITF entry
- PR = Protected ranking
- SR = Special ranking
- SE = Special exempt
- JE = Junior exempt
- JR = Junior Accelerator Programme entrant
- CO = College Accelerator Programme entrant
- NG = Next Gen Accelerator Program entrant
- w/o = Walkover
- r = Retired
- d = Defaulted

=== Finals ===
Semifinals
WC	(Croatia) Ivan Dodig	6^{4}	1
LL	(Russia) Andrey Rublev	7^{7}	6
4	(Italy) Paolo Lorenzi	6	4	6
(Italy) Alessandro Giannessi	2	6	3

Final
LL	(Russia) Andrey Rublev	6	6
4	(Italy) Paolo Lorenzi	4	2

=== Top half ===
First round
Q	(Hungary) A Balázs	6	0	7
(Bosnia and Herzegovina) D Džumhur	3	6	5
(Romania) M Copil	4	6^{4}
WC	(Croatia) I Dodig	6	7^{7}
(Italy) M Cecchinato	6	3	6
5	(France) G Simon	1	6	1
(Russia) M Youzhny	3	5
(Argentina) N Kicker	6	7
(Slovakia) A Martin	6	6
(Uzbekistan) D Istomin	3	2
(Argentina) C Berlocq	2	4
LL	(Russia) A Rublev	6	6

Second round
1/WC	(Belgium) D Goffin	6	6^{7}	6
Q	(Hungary) A Balázs	4	7^{9}	2
WC	(Croatia) I Dodig	3	7^{8}	6
(Italy) M Cecchinato	6	6^{6}	2
3	(Italy) F Fognini	6	1	6
(Argentina) N Kicker	4	6	2
(Slovakia) A Martin	6^{5}	5
LL	(Russia) A Rublev	7^{7}	7

Quarterfinals
1/WC	(Belgium) D Goffin	5	3
WC	(Croatia) I Dodig	7	6
3	(Italy) F Fognini	7^{7}	2	6^{2}
LL	(Russia) A Rublev	6^{5}	6	7^{7}

Semifinals
WC	(Croatia) I Dodig	6^{4}	1
LL	(Russia) A Rublev	7^{7}	6

=== Bottom half ===
First round
8	(Czech Republic) J Veselý	6	6
(Slovakia) N Gombos	4	0
(Moldova) R Albot	6	6
Q	(Serbia) M Zekić	4	0
(Portugal) J Sousa	3	6	4
(United Kingdom) A Bedene	6	4	6
7	(France) B Paire	2	6	3
Q	(France) K de Schepper	6	4	6
WC	(Australia) M Polmans	7^{7}	3	4
(Italy) A Giannessi	6^{3}	6	6
(Brazil) R Dutra Silva	6	6
Q	(Argentina) M Trungelliti	1	2

Second round
8	(Czech Republic) J Veselý	7^{7}	6
(Moldova) R Albot	6^{3}	2
(United Kingdom) A Bedene	5	3
4	(Italy) P Lorenzi	7	6
Q	(France) K de Schepper	2	6	3
(Italy) A Giannessi	6	3	6
(Brazil) R Dutra Silva	7^{7}	4	6
2	(France) G Monfils	6^{5}	6	3

Quarterfinals
8	(Czech Republic) J Veselý	6	5	3
4	(Italy) P Lorenzi	1	7	6
(Italy) A Giannessi	6^{3}	6	7
(Brazil) R Dutra Silva	7^{7}	2	5

Semifinals
4	(Italy) P Lorenzi	6	4	6
(Italy) A Giannessi	2	6	3

== Qualifying ==
=== Seeds ===
1. (Russia) Andrey Rublev (qualifying competition, Lucky loser)
2. (France) Kenny de Schepper (qualified)
3. (Argentina) Marco Trungelliti (qualified)
4. (Italy) Stefano Napolitano (qualifying competition)
5. (Hungary) Attila Balázs (qualified)
6. (Serbia) Miljan Zekić (qualified)
7. (Croatia) Franko Škugor (qualifying competition)
8. (Italy) Matteo Donati (qualifying competition)

=== Qualifiers ===
1. (Hungary) Attila Balázs
2. (France) Kenny de Schepper
3. (Argentina) Marco Trungelliti
4. (Serbia) Miljan Zekić

=== Lucky losers ===
1. (Russia) Andrey Rublev

=== Qualifying draw ===
==== First qualifier ====
First round
1	(Russia) Andrey Rublev	6	6
(Spain) Jordi Samper Montaña	2	4
PR	(Croatia) Matija Pecotić	6	6^{4}	2
5	(Hungary) Attila Balázs	3	7^{7}	6

Qualifying competition
1	(Russia) Andrey Rublev	3	5
5	(Hungary) Attila Balázs	6	7

==== Second qualifier ====
First round
2	(France) Kenny de Schepper	6	7
(Italy) Matteo Viola	2	5
(Germany) Nils Langer	7^{8}	2	3
7	(Croatia) Franko Škugor	6^{6}	6	6

Qualifying competition
2	(France) Kenny de Schepper	1	7^{7}	7^{9}
7	(Croatia) Franko Škugor	6	6^{2}	6^{7}

==== Third qualifier ====
First round
3	(Argentina) Marco Trungelliti	6	6
WC	(Croatia) Rocco Savin	1	1
(Italy) Walter Trusendi	6	4	3
8	(Italy) Matteo Donati	4	6	6

Qualifying competition
3	(Argentina) Marco Trungelliti	6	6
8	(Italy) Matteo Donati	2	4

==== Fourth qualifier ====
First round
4	(Italy) Stefano Napolitano	6	7
(Bosnia and Herzegovina) Tomislav Brkić	3	5
WC	(Croatia) Nino Serdarušić	6	3	4
6	(Serbia) Miljan Zekić	3	6	6

Qualifying competition
4	(Italy) Stefano Napolitano	3	5
6	(Serbia) Miljan Zekić	6	7
