= 2017 Croatia Open Umag =

- Date: 17–23 July
- Edition: 28th
- Category: ATP World Tour 250
- Draw: 28S / 16D
- Prize money: €482,060
- Surface: Clay
- Location: Umag, Croatia

Champions

Singles
- (Russia) Andrey Rublev

Doubles
- (Argentina) Guillermo Durán / (Argentina) Andrés Molteni
| ← 2016 · | Croatia Open | · 2018 → |

The 2017 Croatia Open Umag (also known as the Plava Laguna Croatia Open Umag for sponsorship reasons) was a men's tennis tournament played on outdoor clay courts. It was the 28th edition of the Croatia Open, and part of the World Tour 250 Series tier of the 2017 ATP World Tour. It took place at the International Tennis Center in Umag, Croatia, from 17 July through 23 July 2017. Unseeded Andrey Rublev, who entered the main draw as a lucky loser, won the singles title.

== Finals ==
=== Singles ===
(Russia) Andrey Rublev defeated (Italy) Paolo Lorenzi, 6–4, 6–2

- It was Rublev's only singles title of the year and the 1st of his career.

=== Doubles ===
(Argentina) Guillermo Durán / (Argentina) Andrés Molteni defeated (Croatia) Marin Draganja / (Croatia) Tomislav Draganja, 6–3, 6–7^{(4–7)}, [10–6]

== Singles main draw entrants ==
=== Seeds ===
| Country | Player | Rank^{1} | Seed |
|---|---|---|---|
| BEL | David Goffin | 13 | 1 |
| FRA | Gaël Monfils | 14 | 2 |
| ITA | Fabio Fognini | 29 | 3 |
| ITA | Paolo Lorenzi | 33 | 4 |
| FRA | Gilles Simon | 36 | 5 |
| ~~CRO~~ | ~~Borna Ćorić~~ | ~~45~~ | ~~6~~ |
| FRA | Benoît Paire | 46 | 7 |
| CZE | Jiří Veselý | 48 | 8 |

- ^{1} Rankings are as of July 3, 2017

=== Other entrants ===
The following players received wildcards into the singles main draw:

- (Croatia) Ivan Dodig
- (Belgium) David Goffin
- (Australia) Marc Polmans

The following players received entry from the qualifying draw:

- (Hungary) Attila Balázs
- (France) Kenny de Schepper
- (Argentina) Marco Trungelliti
- (Serbia) Miljan Zekić

The following player received entry as a lucky loser:

- (Russia) Andrey Rublev

=== Withdrawals ===
Before the tournament

- (Croatia) Borna Ćorić →replaced by (Russia) Andrey Rublev
- (Austria) Andreas Haider-Maurer →replaced by (Italy) Alessandro Giannessi
- (Slovakia) Martin Kližan →replaced by (Slovakia) Andrej Martin
- (Germany) Philipp Kohlschreiber →replaced by (Italy) Marco Cecchinato
- (Japan) Yūichi Sugita →replaced by (Slovakia) Norbert Gombos

== Doubles main draw entrants ==
=== Seeds ===
| Country | Player | Country | Player | Rank^{1} | Seed |
|---|---|---|---|---|---|
| BLR | Max Mirnyi | CAN | Daniel Nestor | 66 | 1 |
| CRO | Ivan Dodig | CRO | Franko Škugor | 100 | 2 |
| ARG | Guillermo Durán | ARG | Andrés Molteni | 132 | 3 |
| USA | James Cerretani | USA | Max Schnur | 188 | 4 |

- Rankings are as of July 3, 2017

=== Other entrants ===
The following pairs received wildcards into the doubles main draw:

- (Croatia) Borna Ćorić / (Croatia) Nino Serdarušić
- (Croatia) Marin Draganja / (Croatia) Tomislav Draganja

=== Withdrawals ===
Before the tournament

- (Croatia) Borna Ćorić
- (Portugal) João Sousa
