= Lucky loser =

Losing sports player entering due to player withdrawal

The 1958 World Cup football qualifying playoff of Israel against "lucky loser" Wales, who were the eventual quarter-finalists in the tournament.

A lucky loser is a sports competitor (player or team) who loses a match in a knockout tournament or loses in qualifying, but who then enters the main draw. This can occur when another competitor withdraws during the tournament because of illness, injury, or other reasons, in which case the lucky loser re-enters the competition in place of the withdrawn competitor, or due to the structure of the tournament.

In the event of a lucky loser's re-entry to a competition, it usually occurs before all competitors in the main draw have started their first match in the tournament.

== Tennis ==
=== Lucky losers as winners and finalists ===
It is rare for a lucky loser to win an ATP or WTA Tour tournament; Heinz Gunthardt did it in 1978 (at Springfield), Bill Scanlon in 1978 (at Maui), Francisco Clavet in 1990 in Hilversum, Christian Miniussi in 1991 in São Paulo, Sergiy Stakhovsky in 2008 in Zagreb, Rajeev Ram in 2009 in Newport, Andrey Rublev in 2017 in Umag, Leonardo Mayer in the following week in 2017 in Hamburg, Marco Cecchinato at the Hungarian Open in 2018, and Kwon Soon-Woo at the 2023 Adelaide International 2. In total, ten men have done it since 1978.

In May 2023, Jan-Lennard Struff became the first lucky loser to reach a final of an ATP Masters 1000 event, at the 2023 Mutua Madrid Open. Three men's doubles teams have won a tournament as lucky losers.

In March 1980, Kay McDaniel won a WTA minor league title in Atlanta as a lucky loser, but the WTA recognizes Andrea Jaeger as the first lucky loser to win a WTA title, in Las Vegas in 1980.

In 2018, Olga Danilović won a WTA Tour event as a lucky loser in Moscow in 2018, where some sources have claimed she is the first woman to win a main tour WTA singles title as a lucky loser.

In October 2019, Coco Gauff defeated Jeļena Ostapenko 6–3, 1–6, 6–2 at the Upper Austria Ladies Linz tournament at the age of 15 to become the third woman to accomplish the feat.

The next to do so was Maria Timofeeva, who won the title at the 2023 Hungarian Grand Prix. She defeated Kateryna Baindl in the final, after losing to Anna Sisková in the final qualifying round. Not only was she a lucky loser, it was also her first main-draw appearance in a WTA tournament. She became the first player to win on debut since Angelique Widjaja in 2001. Just two weeks after Timofeeva's triumph in Budapest, Nao Hibino became the fifth woman to win a WTA title as a lucky loser, defeating Linda Nosková in the final of the Prague Open. And it was only three more weeks before yet another lucky loser triumphed, this one being Sara Sorribes Tormo at the Tennis in the Land tournament in Cleveland, Ohio. Donna Vekić became the seventh lucky loser to win a WTA event, defeating Emma Raducanu in the final of the 2026 Queen's Club Championships, the first to do so at a WTA 500 tournament.

Vitalia Diatchenko joined the list of such winners when triumphing in the inaugural WTA 125 series tournament in Angers in 2021, although this is not regarded as a full WTA title. Not only did she win the title as a lucky loser, but she came back from a set and 0-4 down in the second round to defeat Daniela Vismane, the player who had beaten her in the final qualifying round.

Lucky losers who have reached the finals of a tennis tournament and lost include Andreas Haider-Maurer, who reached the final in 2010 Vienna before losing to top-seeded Jürgen Melzer, Marcel Granollers who lost against David Ferrer in 2010 Valencia, and Pablo Cuevas, beaten in the 2019 Estoril Open final by Stefanos Tsitsipas. Cuevas had lost to Salvatore Caruso in the second round of qualifying, but beat him when they met again in the first round proper. On the women's side, Melinda Czink reached the final of the 2005 Canberra International but lost to Ana Ivanovic, who had also defeated Czink in the final round of qualifying. In 2012, CoCo Vandeweghe finished runner-up to Serena Williams at the Stanford Classic. In 2021, Jaqueline Cristian finished runner-up to Alison Riske Amritraj at the WTA event in Linz.

=== Ethical issues and change in policy ===
In tennis, the rule for choosing a player to enter the main draw as a lucky loser is as follows: from all players eliminated in the final round of qualifying, the highest-ranked player in the ATP or WTA rankings is the first one to enter the draw, followed by the second highest-ranked player and so on (if more players withdrew before the start of the tournament). On rare occasions that there are more late withdrawals than losers in the last qualifying rounds or players eligible for lucky losers are not available, a player who lost in the penultimate round of qualifying may enter as lucky loser.

Prior to the 2005 Wimbledon Championships, American player Justin Gimelstob faced George Bastl from Switzerland in the final qualification round. Gimelstob, who was the highest-ranked player remaining in the qualifying tournament, aggravated a chronic back complaint during his second qualification match against Vladimir Voltchkov. Gimelstob planned to withdraw before the match with Bastl, and informed his opponent of his intent. However, officials suggested that Gimelstob play at least one game, as it was almost certain someone would withdraw from the main draw before the tournament started, giving Gimelstob a good chance of getting a berth as a lucky loser (as well as giving him time for his back to recover). Gimelstob did indeed enter the main draw as a lucky loser after the withdrawal of Andre Agassi, reaching the third round, where he lost to Lleyton Hewitt.

While Gimelstob's behavior was not generally considered unethical, it raised concerns by pointing out that any player in a similar position would have little incentive to play a competitive match. For example, a high-ranking player paired against a lower-ranked friend might deliberately lose the match to help his friend gain entry to the tournament, if the first player had already clinched a lucky loser spot. The possibility of bribery was also a concern.

Shortly thereafter, a new policy was introduced in Grand Slam tournaments to help prevent this potential problem. If a main-draw withdrawal occurs after the completion of qualifying, then the highest-ranked player who lost in the final round of qualifying moves into the main draw as a lucky loser. Similarly, if a second main-draw withdrawal occurs after the completion of qualifying, this slot is awarded to the second highest-ranked loser from the final round of qualifying. This same method of choosing would continue if there are further main-draw withdrawals in the tournament. However, if a main-draw withdrawal occurs before the completion of qualifying, then the two highest-ranked losers in the final round of qualifying go into a random draw for the main-draw spot. Similarly, if two main-draw withdrawals occur before the completion of qualifying, then the three highest-ranked losers in the final round of qualifying go into a random draw for the two main-draw slots.

== Association football ==
After three teams which qualified for the 1950 World Cup withdrew, several teams which had failed to qualify were invited to replace them, but declined.

In qualification for the 1958 World Cup, Israel won the Asia–Africa group without playing a match after their opponents withdrew as part of a mass boycott. FIFA then required Israel to play off against a team drawn from among the other groups' runners-up. Italy and Uruguay declined to enter the draw, while Belgium were selected but withdrew. Ultimately, Wales, who had lost to Czechoslovakia in Group 4 of European qualification, were drawn, defeated Israel and reached the quarter-finals of the tournament.

The 1960–1999 UEFA Cup Winners' Cup was intended for the winners of each UEFA member's domestic knock-out cup competition. However, where a club won the double of both the cup and the round-robin league, they entered the more prestigious European Cup reserved for league champions, with the losing cup finalists entering the Cup Winners' Cup. Five domestic cup runners-up won the Cup Winners' Cup: Fiorentina (1960–61), Rangers (1971–72), Anderlecht (1977–78), Dinamo Tbilisi (1980–81), and Barcelona (1996–97). Similar provisions now apply for the Champions League and Europa League as respective successors to the European Cup and Cup Winners' Cup.

At the 1970 Women's World Cup, West Germany played and lost in two quarter-finals, because travel visa problems prevented Czechoslovakia from attending the tournament in Italy.

The Intercontinental Cup was intended to be contested by the winners of the European Cup and the Copa Libertadores, but on several occasions, the European champions declined to participate and were replaced by the runners-up. Atlético Madrid in 1975 became the only European loser to win the Intercontinental Cup.

Denmark lost to Yugoslavia in group 4 of the qualifying round for UEFA Euro 1992. When Yugoslavia were suspended by a UN sports boycott owing to the Yugoslav Wars, Denmark replaced them and went on to win the tournament.

Manchester United withdrew from the 1999–2000 FA Cup as their first fixture in the tournament clashed with the 2000 FIFA Club World Championship in Brazil. A lucky loser from the second round ties were selected to take the final place in the third round draw, guaranteed an away tie. Darlington, who had been defeated by Gillingham in the second round, were selected and drawn away to Aston Villa. Villa won the tie 2–1, and went on to reach the final, where they were defeated by Chelsea.

Mamelodi Sundowns won the 2016 CAF Champions League despite losing to AS Vita Club in the second qualifying round, which originally sent the team down to the 2016 CAF Confederation Cup. They were reinstated to the Champions League after losing the Confederation Cup play-off as Vita Club was found guilty of fielding an ineligible player in their preliminary round tie against Mafunzo and was disqualified, henceforth nullifying the second qualifying round and Mamelodi was the winner by forfeit.

Portugal lost to Russia in qualifying play-offs for UEFA Women's Euro 2022. However, Russia were suspended by FIFA and UEFA on 28 February 2022 due to their country's invasion of Ukraine. As a consequence, Russia were banned from the tournament and Portugal replaced them.

== College basketball ==
NCAA Division I men's college basketball teams compete to earn a place in an annual tournament to determine that season's champion. Teams may qualify for the tournament by earning an automatic bid as the champion or other designated representative of their conference or by being selected at-large by a committee.

In general, each conference conducts a tournament at the conclusion of its regular season to determine which team gets its automatic bid to the NCAA tournament. Each conference determines its own format for its tournament, including how many of its teams participate and how match-ups are determined. Some conferences have member teams that are not eligible for the NCAA tournament due to either being in transition to Division I or sanctions as a result of rules violations. While some conferences exclude such teams from the conference tournament, others do not. A team in transition to Division I is generally not eligible for the NCAA tournament during its first four years as a Division I team. Some conferences exclude teams from the conference tournament for part, but not all, of the transition period.

If a conference allows ineligible teams to participate in its tournament, it must have a system in place to determine to which team the automatic bid will be awarded, should an ineligible team win the conference tournament. In 2023, six of the 32 Division I conferences allowed some or all of their ineligible teams to participate in the conference tournament. Five of these placed no restriction on participation; one, the Northeast Conference, allowed teams in their third and fourth years of transition to participate.

The rules used to determine the automatic bid for conferences allowing ineligible teams to participate in 2023 conference tournaments were as follows:

- ASUN Conference: If a team that is not eligible for the NCAA tournament won the ASUN tournament, the conference's automatic bid would go to the conference's regular-season champion. In the case of a tie for first place, the automatic bid would go to the tied team that advanced furthest in the conference tournament. If all tied teams are eliminated in the same round of the conference tournament, the automatic bid would go to the highest seeded team in accordance with the conference's tiebreaking procedures.
- Northeast Conference: If a reclassifying institution won the NEC tournament, the conference's automatic bid to the NCAA tournament would go to the NEC tournament runner-up.
- Ohio Valley Conference: If a team that is not eligible for the NCAA tournament won the conference tournament, the conference's automatic bid would go to the tournament runner-up. If that team is also not eligible, i.e. two ineligible teams met in the tournament final, the automatic bid would go to the highest seeded tournament-eligible team.
- Southland Conference: If a team that is not eligible for the NCAA tournament won the Southland Conference tournament, the conference's automatic bid would go to the regular-season champion.
- Summit League: If a team that is not eligible for the NCAA tournament won the Summit League tournament, the conference's automatic bid would go to the highest seeded postseason eligible team.
- Western Athletic Conference: If a team that is not eligible for the NCAA tournament won the conference tournament, the conference's automatic bid would go to the highest seeded tournament-eligible team.

Since many teams are selected for the NCAA tournament despite losing in their conference tournament, and it is not uncommon for them to win the NCAA tournament, not every such team can be branded a lucky loser. However, many conferences are regarded as weaker and will clearly have only one team representing each of them at the NCAA tournament. Further, the seeding of a team that receives an automatic bid to the NCAA tournament implicitly confirms or disproves the team would have received an at-large bid. Therefore, a team that qualifies for the NCAA tournament despite losing in its conference tournament and clearly would not have received an at-large bid has characteristics typical of a lucky loser.

In 2022, the Bellarmine Knights won the ASUN Tournament but were ineligible for the NCAA tournament, because they were in the second year of their four-year transition period from Division II. The Jacksonville State Gamecocks, who lost in the ASUN tournament semifinals, were awarded the conference's automatic bid, because they were the conference's regular-season champions. The Gamecocks lost their first-round game in the NCAA tournament to Auburn, 80–61.

The Merrimack Warriors were ineligible for the 2023 NCAA tournament, because they were just a few months away from completing the mandated four-year reclassification process from Division II to Division I. Merrimack's victory in the semifinals of the conference tournament was completed before the second semifinal between the Fairleigh Dickinson Knights and the Saint Francis Red Flash began, which meant both teams knew that the winner of their semifinal game would get the automatic bid. The Knights defeated the Red Flash, 70–50, to earn the automatic bid. Three days later, Fairleigh Dickinson became a lucky loser, when it lost the NEC tournament championship game to Merrimack, 67–66. Fairleigh Dickinson went on to defeat the Texas Southern Tigers, 84–61, in a First Four contest on March 15, before its 63–58 upset of the Purdue Boilermakers at Nationwide Arena two days later, to become the second-ever underdog to win a #1 vs. #16 match. Fairleigh Dickinson was eliminated from the NCAA tournament with a 78–70 loss to the Florida Atlantic Owls in the second round on March 19.

Because conferences do not determine which team gets their automatic bid the same way, a lucky loser college basketball team may qualify for the NCAA tournament either before or after it loses in its conference tournament. In the 2022 ASUN tournament, when Jacksonville State, the 2022 ASUN regular-season champion, lost its semifinal game, Bellarmine had already defeated Liberty in the other semifinal. Therefore, Jacksonville State had an opportunity to become a lucky loser, if Bellarmine (which was ineligible) were to defeat Jacksonville in the ASUN tournament final, because the ASUN gives its automatic bid to the regular-season champion, if the tournament champion is ineligible. Had Bellarmine lost the ASUN tournament final, Jacksonville would have earned the ASUN's automatic bid.

In contrast, the Northeast Conference gives the automatic bid to its tournament runner-up, if the tournament winner is ineligible. Since Merrimack was ineligible in 2023, and had already won its semifinal game to reach the tournament final before the second semifinal between Fairleigh Dickinson and Saint Francis (PA) began, those two teams were assured of the automatic bid with a semifinal victory. Since Fairleigh Dickinson's loss in the Northeast Conference tournament came after it had secured a berth in the NCAA tournament, its lucky loser status was acquired in a game in which it could not be eliminated.

== Beach volleyball ==
In beach volleyball at the Summer Olympics, the tournaments are structured such that wild card rounds are required for the number of teams in the final rounds to be a power of two. under the rules used for the 2020 and 2024 Summer Olympics, 24 teams compete in a round-robin tournament in six pools of four teams each. The first- and second-place teams from each pool advance to the eighthfinal round of 16, while the third-place teams from each pool compete in a playoff to fill the remaining 4 spots.

== Ski jumping ==
The Four Hills Tournament events follow a knock-out system first introduced for the 1996–97 season. Unlike most ski jumping events where the best 30 out of 50 competitors in the first round qualify for the second round, the 50 competitors are divided into 25 pairs. All 25 winners of these duels plus the five best "lucky losers" qualify for the second round.

== See also ==
- Bye (sports)
- Wild card (sports)
