= Andrey Rublev =

Russian tennis player (born 1997)

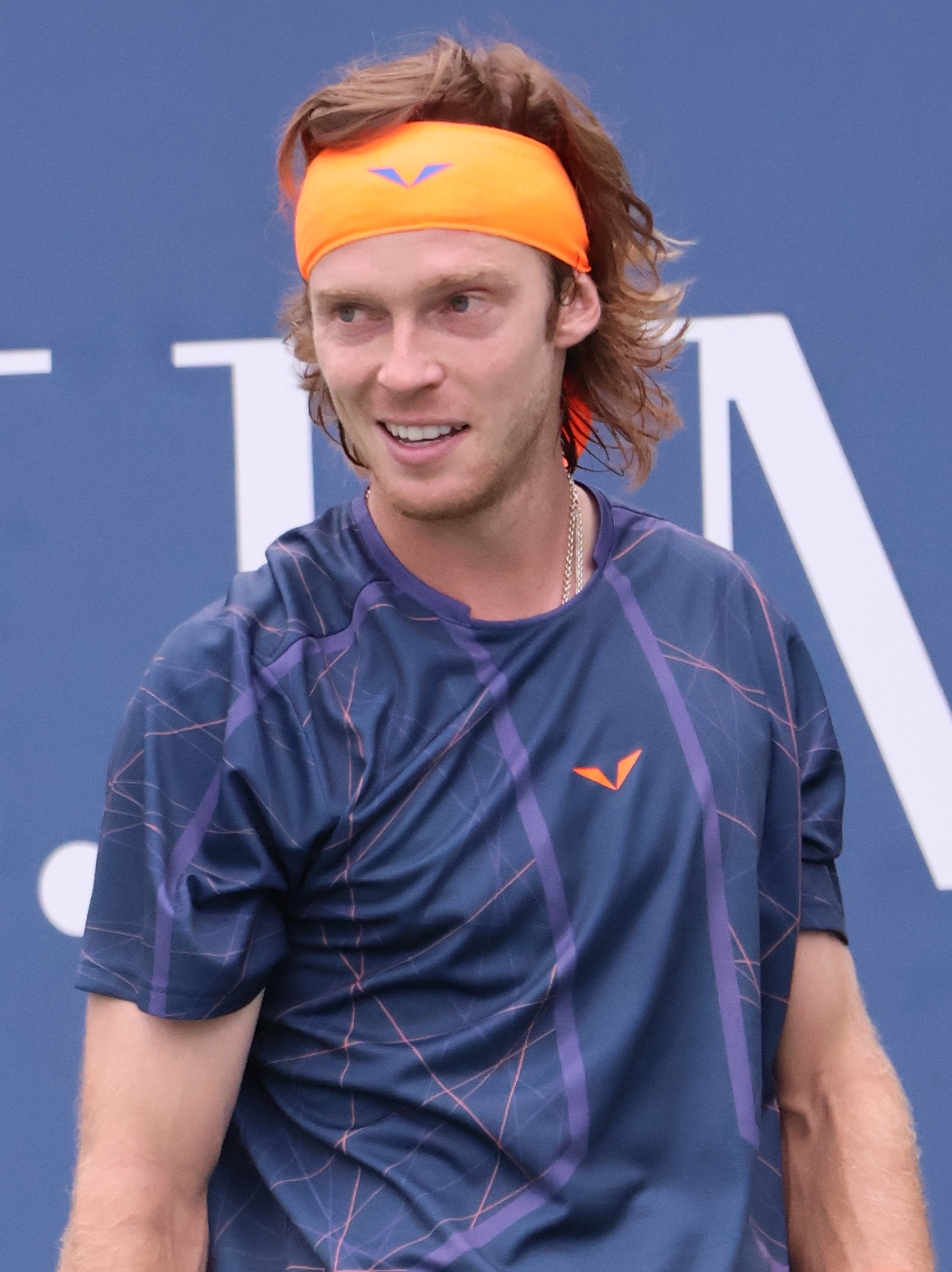
- Rublev at the 2023 US Open
- Full name: Andrey Andreyevich Rublev
- Native name: Андрей Андреевич Рублёв
- Country (sports): Russia
- Residence: Dubai, UAE
- Born: 20 October 1997 (age 29) Moscow, Russia
- Height: 1.88 m (6 ft 2 in)
- Turned pro: 2014
- Plays: Right-handed (two-handed backhand)
- Coach: Marat Safin (Apr 2025–); Fernando Vicente; Alberto Martín (2023–May 2025)
- Prize money: US $35,541,944: 12th all-time in earnings

Singles
- Career record: 402–232
- Career titles: 18
- Highest ranking: No. 5 (13 September 2021)
- Current ranking: No. 23 (9 November 2026)

Grand Slam singles results
- Australian Open: QF (2021, 2023, 2024)
- French Open: QF (2020, 2022)
- Wimbledon: QF (2023)
- US Open: QF (2017, 2020, 2022, 2023)

Other tournaments
- Tour Finals: SF (2022)
- Olympic Games: 1R (2020)

Doubles
- Career record: 92–92
- Career titles: 4
- Highest ranking: No. 44 (6 November 2023)
- Current ranking: No. 220 (28 September 2026)

Grand Slam doubles results
- Australian Open: 2R (2019)
- US Open: 3R (2017)

Other doubles tournaments
- Olympic Games: 1R (2020)

Mixed doubles
- Career titles: 1

Grand Slam mixed doubles results
- US Open: SF (2026)

Other mixed doubles tournaments
- Olympic Games: W (2021)

Team competitions
- Davis Cup: W (2021)
Medal record
Representing ROC
Olympic Games
Gold medal – first place	2020 Tokyo	Mixed doubles
Representing Russia
Youth Olympic Games
Bronze medal – third place	2014 Nanjing	Singles
Silver medal – second place	2014 Nanjing	Doubles
- Last updated on: 28 September 2026.

Andrey Andreyevich Rublev (Note: Also transliterated as Andrey Rublyov; Russian: Андрей Андреевич Рублёв, Russian pronunciation: [andrej rublʲov]) (born 20 October 1997) is a Russian professional tennis player. He has been ranked by the ATP as high as world No. 5 in singles, which he achieved on 13 September 2021, and No. 44 in doubles, attained on 6 November 2023. Rublev has won 18 ATP Tour singles titles, including two ATP Masters 1000 events in Monte-Carlo and Madrid. He has also won four tour-level doubles titles, including the 2023 Madrid Open, with Karen Khachanov. He has reached the singles quarterfinals of all four majors and won a gold medal in mixed doubles at the 2020 Tokyo Olympics, with Anastasia Pavlyuchenkova.

Rublev won his first ATP Tour title in doubles at the 2015 Kremlin Cup, with Dmitry Tursunov. He won his first singles title at the 2017 Croatia Open. Rublev first reached the top 10 in the ATP rankings in October 2020. He was part of the victorious Russian team at the 2020–21 Davis Cup.

== Early life ==
Andrey Rublev was born in Moscow to Andrey Rublev Sr., a former professional boxer turned restaurant manager, and Marina Marenko (née Tyurakova; Russian: Тюракова), a tennis coach at the Spartak Tennis Club. His mother worked with tennis players such as Anna Kournikova and received the Medal of the Order "For Merit to the Fatherland" in 2009. She is also the mother of Anna Arina Marenko, Rublev's older half-sister and former professional tennis player.

Rublev has Austrian ancestry on his paternal side, through his grandmother Larisa Genrikhovna Rubleva. He often credits his paternal grandparents for raising him as a child for five days a week until he was 15. Rublev denies the claims his mother used to be harsh towards him: "She was definitely not harsh. My parents always did everything for me. They love me very much". His maternal grandfather, Andrey Fyodorovich Tyurakov was a pro-coach in Greco-Roman wrestling, an amateur tennis player and doubles partner of Boris Sobkin, a coach of professional tennis player Mikhail Youzhny and sparring partner of Grand Slam doubles champion Olga Morozova in her prime years.

In 2013, Belarusian Sergey Tarasevich became his other coach. Then Tarasevich was replaced by Fernando Vicente from Spain.

== Junior career ==
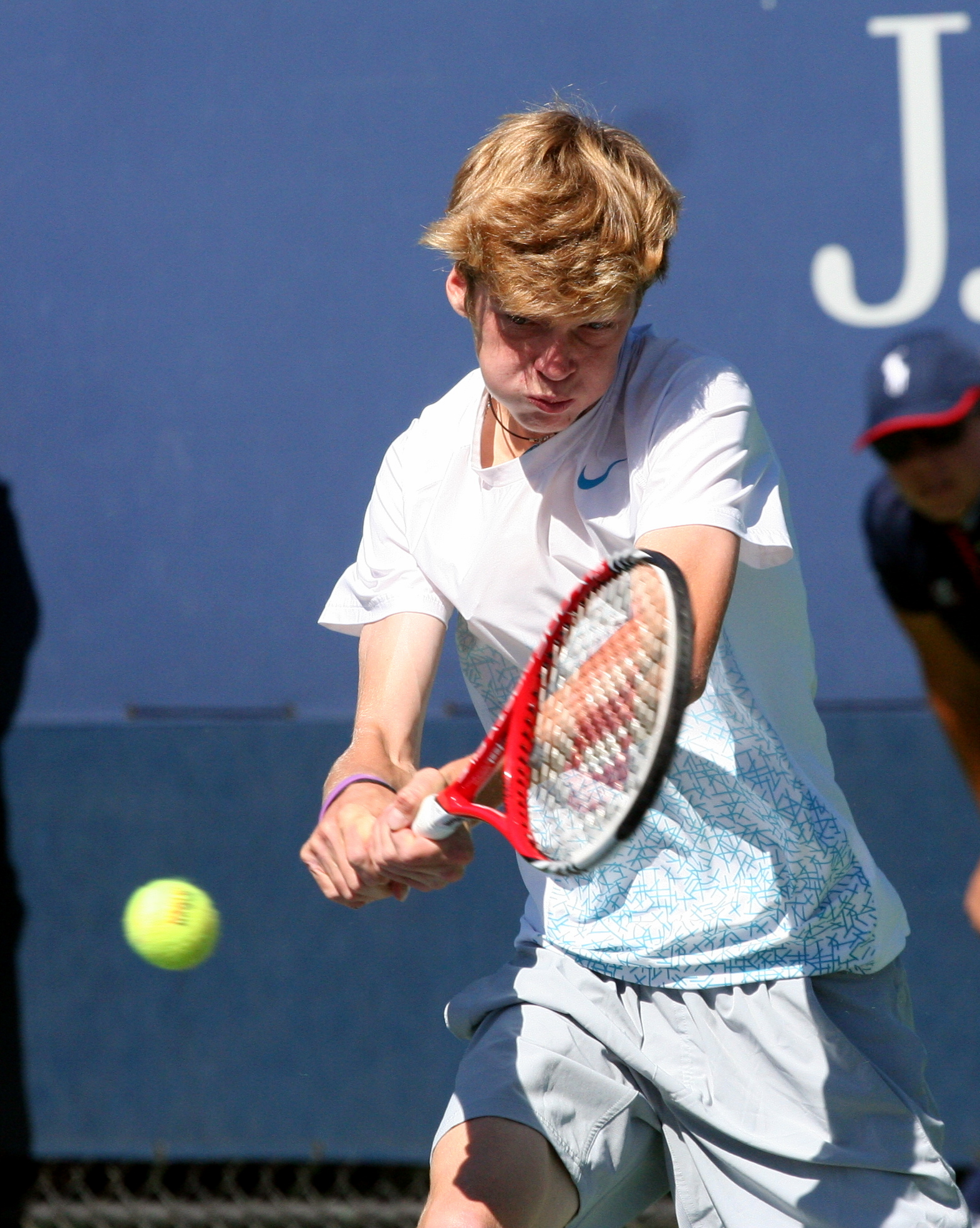
Rublev playing at the 2013 junior US Open

Rublev debuted in Luxembourg at age 13, getting his first win in his second competition in Phoenix. In the following years, Rublev could climb the third rounds in singles, and in December 2012, he won one of the most prestigious junior events, the Orange Bowl.

Next, in spring of 2013, Rublev achieved the NWU Pukke/RVTA Junior ITF 1 cup in Potchefstroom, South Africa. He successfully competed in following tournaments, especially on clay surface, including the Trofeo Bonfiglio in Milan. He became a quarterfinalist in the boys' singles category at the 2014 Australian Open. In the boys' doubles, he paired with German Alexander Zverev, where they reached the quarterfinals. His best result at junior-level came at the 2014 French Open, where he was crowned champion in the boys' singles. He defeated Spaniard Jaume Munar in the final. There, he also reached the semifinals with American Stefan Kozlov. The pair was defeated by eventual champions Benjamin Bonzi and Quentin Halys. As a result of that successful campaign in Paris, he became world No. 1 ITF Junior player on 9 June 2014.

In June 2014, shortly before Wimbledon, Rublev captured the cup at the Nike Junior International in Roehampton, England. In the Wimbledon Championships, he reached the third round, before being beaten by Dutch Tim van Rijthoven in three sets. In doubles, Rublev and Kozlov were runners-up. The pair lost to Brazilians Orlando Luz and Marcelo Zormann in three sets.

Rublev took a break before competing at the 2014 Summer Youth Olympics, where he played in all three events as first-seeded. In singles, he lost to Kamil Majchrzak in three sets, but received a bronze medal for beating Jumpei Yamasaki. Partnering with fellow Karen Khachanov in doubles, Rublev reached the finals, where they again lost to Brazilians Luz and Zormann. He and his mixed partner Daria Kasatkina only reached the second round, where they were defeated by silver medalists Ye Qiuyu and Yamazaki.

In April 2015, Rublev finished his junior career by winning the inaugural ITF Junior Masters in Chengdu, China. In the final, he beat American Taylor Fritz in three sets.

== Professional career ==
=== 2013–2014: Early career and Davis Cup debut ===
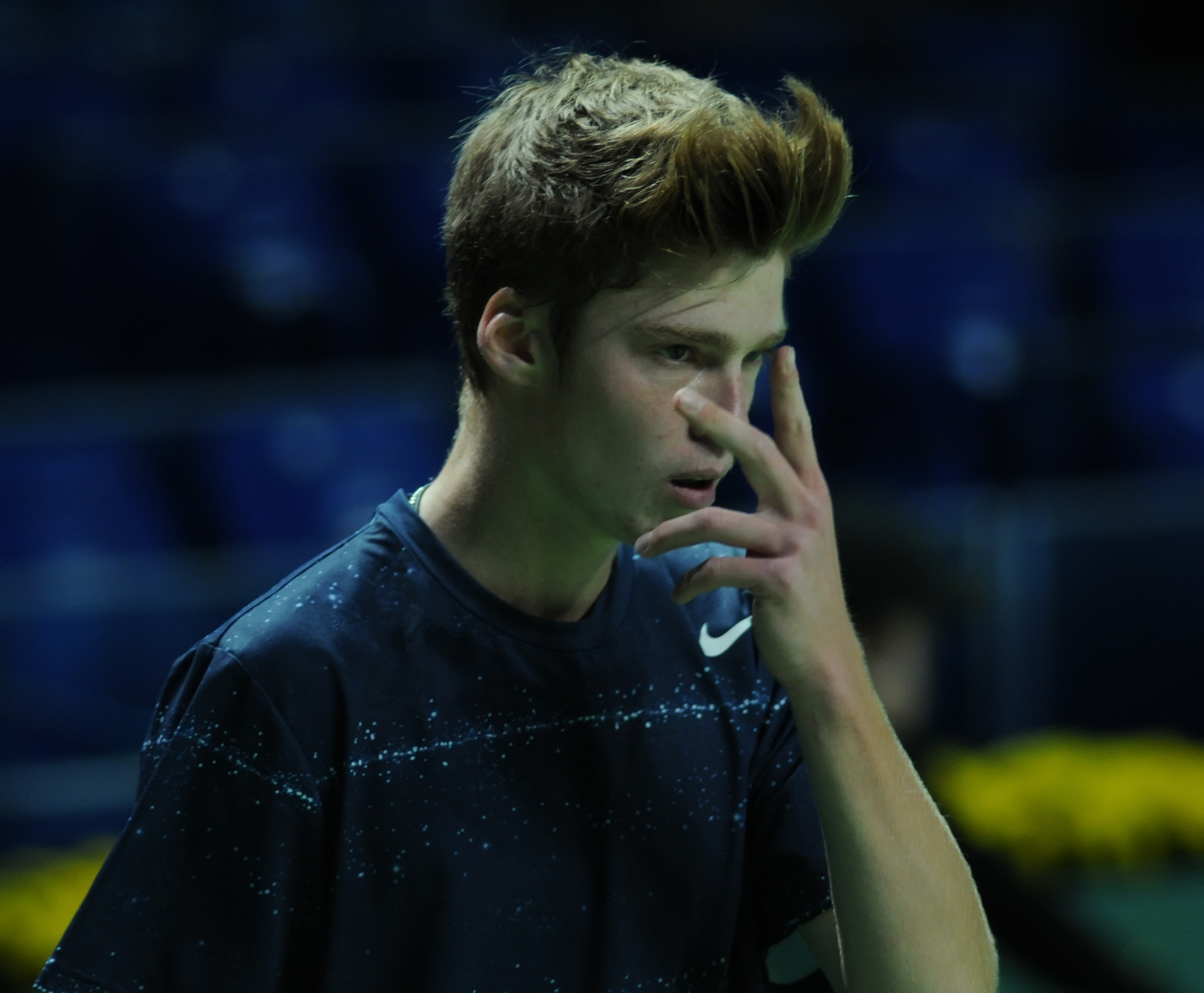
Rublev at the 2014 Kremlin Cup

Rublev debuted at the Bulgaria F6 Futures, reaching the quarterfinals. He continued his career in Bulgaria, where he again reached the quarterfinals, but became runner-up in doubles. The 15-year-old reached his first ITF Futures final in 2013 in Minsk, Belarus. After an unsuccessful fall, he recorded his first win at the F31 Futures in Bradenton, Florida.

In the 2014 Tour he started in Kazakhstan, reaching a semifinal and a final in the two Futures events in Aktobe, respectively. In the latter he beat Belarusian Yaraslav Shyla for his second win. Rublev reached the final of the Czech F1 Futures in doubles, partnering with Pole Andriej Kapaś, and continued his success in the Russian F3 Futures in Moscow, becoming champion in singles and runner-up in the doubles competition.

=== 2015: ATP debut, first doubles title ===
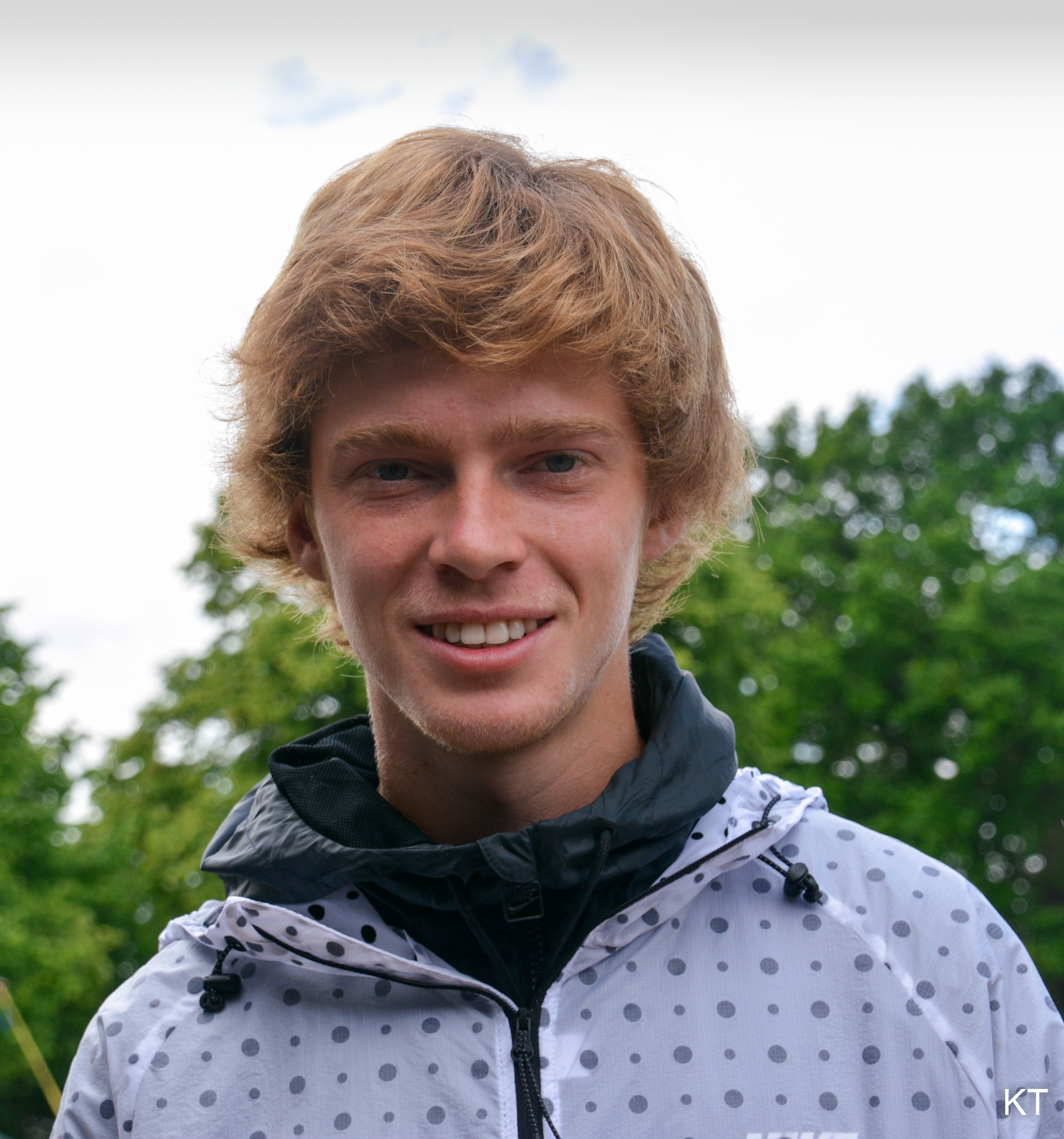
Rublev at the 2015 Wimbledon qualifying round

In 2015, Rublev entered his first ATP tournament in Delray Beach, where he reached the second round losing to Steve Johnson in straight sets.

Rublev made his debut at the Davis Cup, where in the second round play-off of the Europe Zone Group I, in the third rubber, he partnered with Konstantin Kravchuk and won the match against the Portuguese team Gastão Elias / João Sousa in three sets.

The Russian participated at his first Masters 1000 entry in Miami, where he defeated Pablo Carreño Busta, but lost to John Isner. He entered the clay season at the Barcelona Open, where as a qualifier he reached the second round after overcoming Fernando Verdasco.

With his win over Finn Jarkko Nieminen at Geneva Open, 17-year-old Rublev repeated Nadal's success in winning at least once on five ATP tournaments in one season as a teenager who is under 18 years old. (Nadal did that in 2004.)

Rublev was called for the Davis Cup team in the 2015 Davis Cup Europea/Africa Zone Group I match against Spain, held in Vladivostok. After losing his first match against Tommy Robredo, Rublev won his second match against Pablo Andújar in the decisive fifth rubber to complete a 0–2 comeback for Russia against five-time champion Spain. This secured team Russia a place in the World Group play-offs. Russia played in the World Group play-offs last time in 2012, losing then to Brazil 0–5.

Rublev made his major debut at 2015 US Open as a qualifier. Rublev won his first ATP title at the 2015 Kremlin Cup in doubles, partnering with comeback Dmitry Tursunov.

=== 2016: Challenger title ===
Rublev started the 2016 year at the Chennai Open, losing to Stan Wawrinka in the second round. He reached only the first and second rounds of ATP 250 and Challenger tournaments. In March, this poor performance led to his decision to part ways with his coach Sergey Tarasevich. Immediately after that, on 6 March 2016 he made a turn by winning his first Challenger in singles, defeating Paul-Henri Mathieu in Quimper, France. As a result, Rublev jumped 47 positions from 208th to 161st ranking position, a new career-high. In April, he joined 4Slam Academy in Barcelona, run by Galo Blanco.

=== 2017: First ATP title & major quarterfinal, top 50 ===
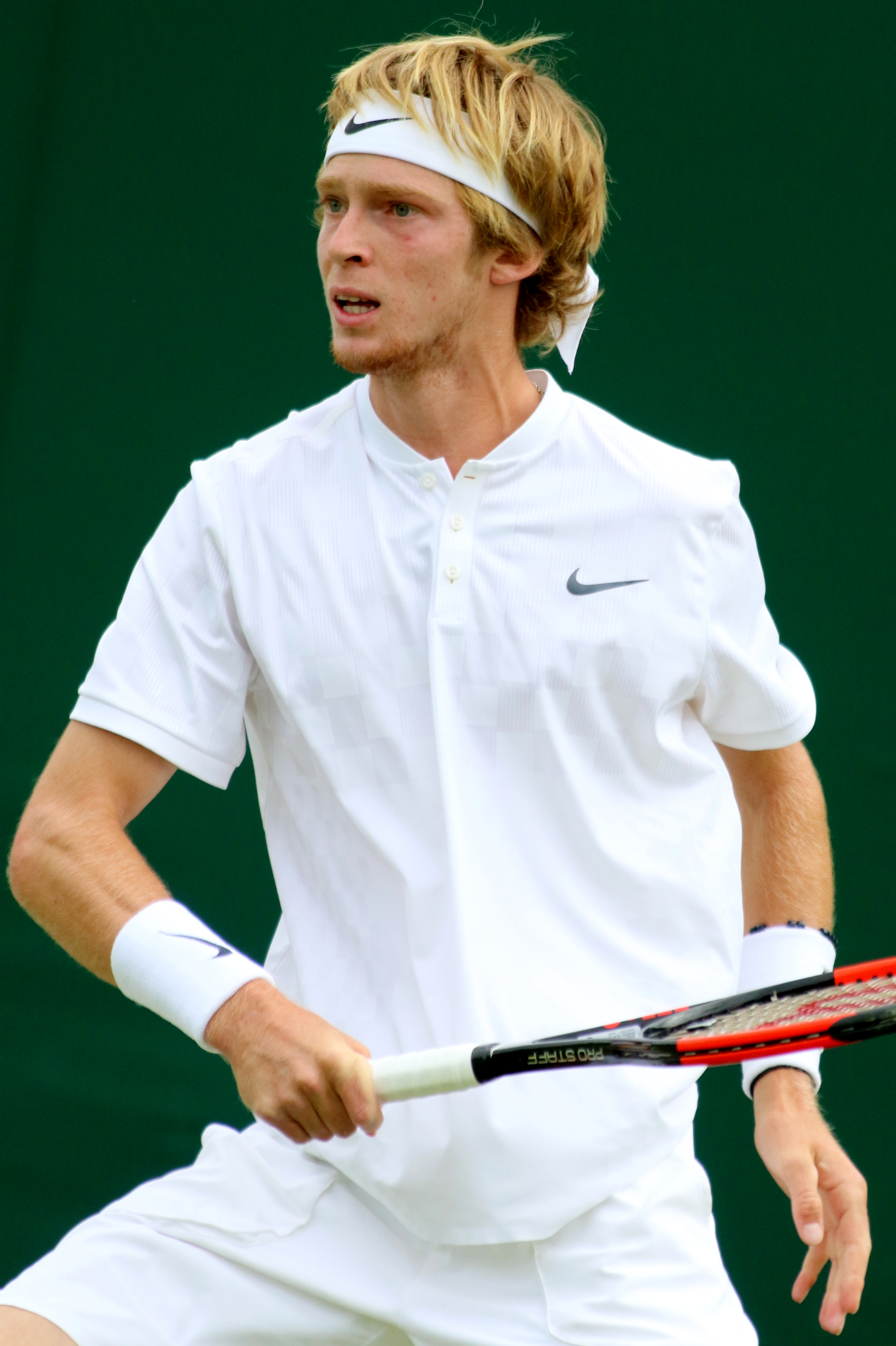
Rublev at the 2017 Wimbledon Championships

Rublev started well in the 2017 ATP World Tour, reaching the second round of the Australian Open after qualifying. On the way he beat 60th-ranked Lu Yen-hsun, but then lost to Andy Murray. Rublev was successful in some Challenger tournaments. He reached the 2017 Open de Rennes Challenger final, losing there to Belarusian Uladzimir Ignatik. Again in Quimper, France, Rublev reached the semifinals, losing to Peter Gojowczyk. Rublev also reached the semifinals in Irving, Texas.

The Russian had some success on grass-court tournaments. He got into the quarterfinals of the Halle Open, losing there to his compatriot Karen Khachanov in a tight match. In the next tournament, the Wimbledon Championships, Rublev could reach round two, losing there to Albert Ramos Viñolas. Despite losing in the qualification round, Rublev as lucky loser reached his first ATP singles final at the Umag Open, beating in the quarterfinals defending champion Fabio Fognini. In the final, he beat Paolo Lorenzi in straight sets to win his first ATP singles title. It was the seventh time that a lucky loser would win a tournament, the last tennis player doing so at that time was Rajeev Ram in 2009 Hall of Fame Tennis Championships. He reached the top 50 at world No. 49, on 24 July 2017.

Rublev went on to compete at the 2017 US Open as a direct entrant. He grabbed his first win against top-10 player, beating No. 9 Grigor Dimitrov in straight sets and made it through to the quarterfinals, beating David Goffin in the fourth round in straight sets. Rublev lost in straight sets to world No. 1 and eventual champion, Rafael Nadal, in the quarterfinals.

The young Russian qualified for the Next Generation ATP Finals in Milan and made it into the finals, but lost to Chung Hyeon.

=== 2018: First Masters doubles final ===
Rublev commenced the 2018 season in Doha, where he went to the final, eventually losing in straight sets to Gaël Monfils. Next, he reached the round of 32 of the Australian Open, where he was seeded for the first time in a Grand Slam event at No. 30, but lost to third seed Grigor Dimitrov, in four sets.

Rublev continued his run of good form by reaching back-to-back quarterfinals in Montepellier and Rotterdam, losing to Jo-Wilfried Tsonga and Grigor Dimitrov, respectively. The Russian then had a first-round exit in Acapulco, losing to David Ferrer. He did not compete at the 2018 French Open or 2018 Wimbledon due to a back injury he sustained at the Monte-Carlo Masters where he lost in the third round to Dominic Thiem after having had a match point.

Later in the season after returning to active play he lost to Frenchman Jérémy Chardy in the first round of the US Open.

=== 2019: Top 10 wins, second ATP title ===
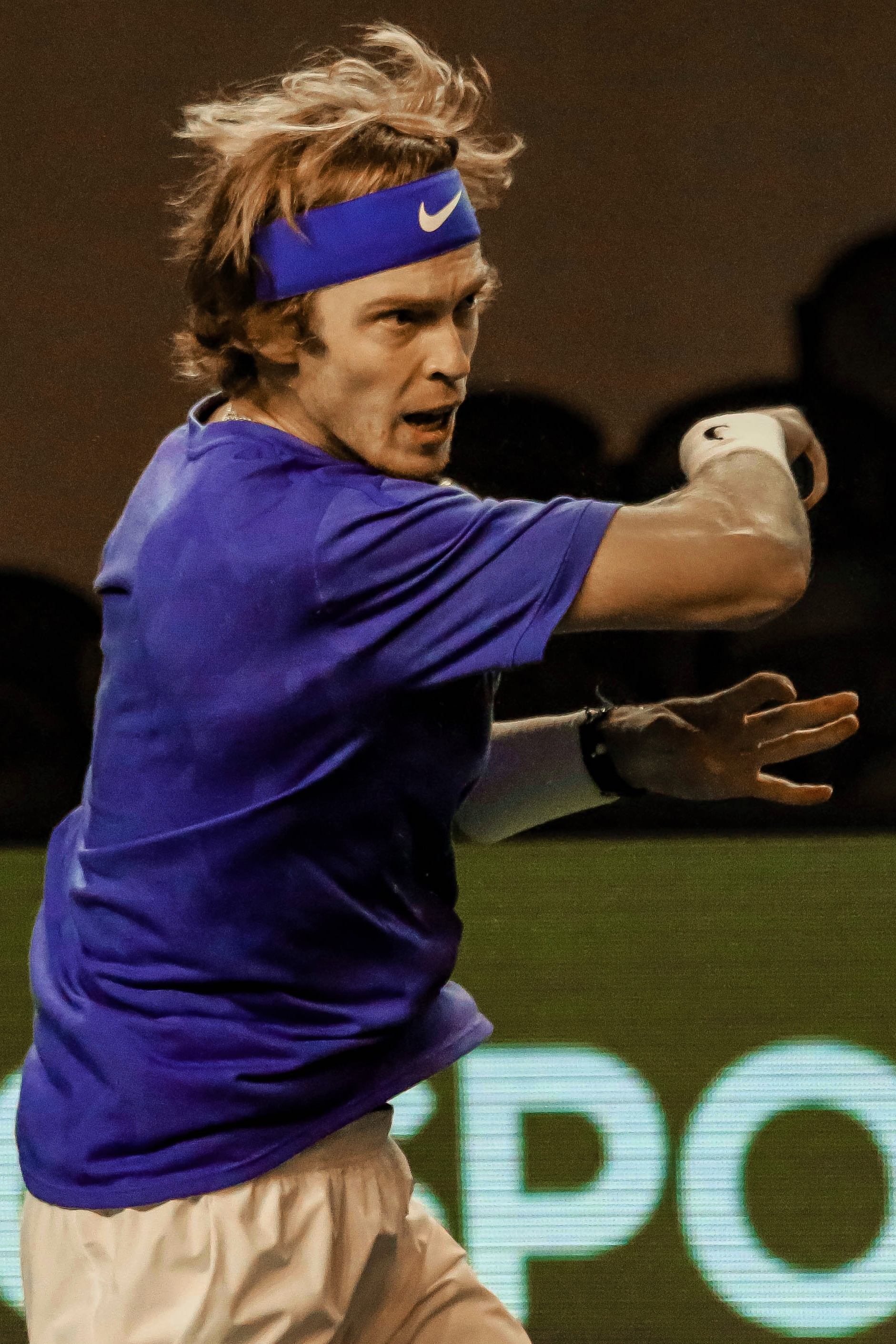
Rublev at the 2019 Paris Masters

Rublev opened 2019 by making the round of sixteen in Doha at a tournament in which he had been the runner-up in the previous year. This loss came at the hand of the fifth seeded Nikoloz Basilashvili who defeated Rublev in straight sets in only 61 minutes. Next, in the 2019 Australian Open, Rublev lost in the first round in four sets to American Mackenzie McDonald.

In the Hamburg European Open, Rublev achieved his second win over a top 10 player by defeating the top seed and world No. 4, Dominic Thiem, in the quarterfinals. He lost to fourth seed Nikoloz Basilashvili in the final.

In August, Rublev had the biggest win of his career so far at the Western & Southern Open in Cincinnati, where he defeated world No. 3, Roger Federer, in the third round in straight sets, handing Federer his fastest loss in some sixteen years. Rublev then went onto to lose to the tournament's eventual winner Daniil Medvedev in the quarterfinals.

At the US Open, the unseeded Rublev defeated eighth seed Stefanos Tsitsipas in four sets in the first round. In the second round, Rublev won the first set against Gilles Simon, but Simon retired early in the second set, sending Rublev into the third round. There he defeated Australian Nick Kyrgios in straight sets, catapulting him to the round of 16 at a Grand Slam tournament for the second time. There, he lost in straight sets to Matteo Berrettini.

Later in the 2019 campaign, Rublev lost in the second round to Fabio Fognini, in straight sets, at the China Open in Beijing, after having beaten Grigor Dimitrov in the first round.

On his 22nd birthday, Rublev won his second ATP title at the Kremlin Cup, defeating Frenchman Adrian Mannarino in straight sets in the final.

=== 2020: Five ATP titles, world No. 8 ===
Rublev entered the 2020 ATP season by winning back-to-back titles. Not allowed to compete in the newly established ATP Cup, as only a country's top two singles tennis players qualified, Rublev instead entered the Qatar Open, this time winning the trophy as he failed to do so two years ago. Next, Rublev took part in the maiden Adelaide International. Third-seeded, Rublev overcame Canadian Félix Auger-Aliassime in a three-set marathon match in the semifinal, before reaching the final and soundly defeating qualifier Lloyd Harris. Together with his results at 2019 Davis Cup Finals, this was 12th consecutive win for Rublev. He became the first player to win two ATP tournaments in the first two weeks of the season since 2004, when Dominik Hrbatý won tournaments in Adelaide and Auckland.

Next up for Rublev was the first of the year's four Grand Slam tournaments, the Australian Open where Rublev extended his early 2020 undefeated winning streak to 11 matches by coming from behind for a four-set third round victory over the 11th seed David Goffin of Belgium. His unbeaten 2020 run then ended the fourth round where he lost in straight sets to the seventh seed Alexander Zverev of Germany, who advanced to his first Australian Open quarterfinal.

Next in the Rotterdam Open, the seventh-seeded Rublev advanced into the quarterfinals with a round of 16 victory over Alexander Bublik of Kazakhstan. However, he then lost in straight sets to Filip Krajinović of Serbia who then advanced to the semifinals. Then, in February at the Dubai Championships, Rublev made it to the quarterfinals where he lost in straight sets to the unseeded Dan Evans of Great Britain.

After tournaments that should have started but were cancelled or postponed due to the COVID-19 pandemic, the late 2020 season saw a number of replacement exhibition tournaments. Rublev participated at the Adria Tour, taking place in the Balkans. The tournament was split into four groups of four players each. Rublev, playing in the Alexander Zverev group, in Zadar, Croatia, beat Marin Čilić, Danilo Petrović and Zverev to qualify into the final, where would have competed with Novak Djokovic. However, one of the participants, Grigor Dimitrov, was tested positive for the coronavirus, and so the final match was cancelled.

Later in the season when competition resumed prior to the US Open, Rublev lost in three sets in a two out of three-set-match to British player Dan Evans in the opening round of the Western & Southern Open, which was played this year at the Billie Jean King National Tennis Center in Flushing Meadows, home of the US Open, instead of Mason, Ohio, where it is traditionally being held. Seeded 10th at the US Open, Rublev defeated Jérémy Chardy and Grégoire Barrère, Salvatore Caruso, all in straight sets. Rublev's round of 16 match pitted was a rematch against a player he lost to in the same round in 2019, the fifth seed Matteo Berrettini. This time, Rublev won in four sets and advanced to his second US Open quarterfinal. He then lost in his quarterfinal match to Daniil Medvedev in straight sets with two tiebreakers.

Next, Rublev achieved his third tour title of the year at the Hamburg European Open, where in the final he defeated second seeded Stefanos Tsitsipas in three sets. However, Tsitsipas returned serve by defeating Rublev in straight sets in the quarterfinals of the French Open. However, this performance guaranteed him a place in the top ten of the ATP rankings on 12 October 2020. Rublev then won his fourth title of the year at the St. Petersburg Open, defeating seventh seed Borna Ćorić, in straight sets. He reached a career-high of World No. 8 on 19 October 2020.

In late October, Rublev achieved his fifth title of 2020 by winning the Vienna Open as the fifth seed. He defeated qualifier Norbert Gombos in straight sets to win his first match of the tournament. Rublev would then beat Jannik Sinner in three sets with Sinner retiring after only three games due to injury. Rublev would then upset second seed and defending champion Dominic Thiem. Rublev would then eliminate Kevin Anderson, Anderson would retire in the second set due to injury. Rublev won his match with Anderson. Rublev would then defeat lucky loser Lorenzo Sonego to win the 2020 Vienna Open singles title. With this win, Rublev qualified for the ATP Finals in London, which was his first ATP Finals appearance.

In mid-November, at the ATP Finals, Rublev was placed in Group London 2020, where he would be eliminated in the round-robin phase. He started off his ATP-Finals debut with a match against Rafael Nadal – the second seed. Nadal beat Rublev. Two days after his loss, Rublev would face off against defending champion and sixth seed, Stefanos Tsitsipas. In his match, Rublev got match point on serve during the deciding set tiebreaker, but he double faulted, and lost the tiebreak and the match. Tsitsipas won, and Rublev was eliminated from the tournament. Two days later, Rublev faced his final opponent: third seed Dominic Thiem whom Rublev defeated to conclude his ATP Final debut.

=== 2021: Mixed doubles Olympic gold, world No. 5 ===
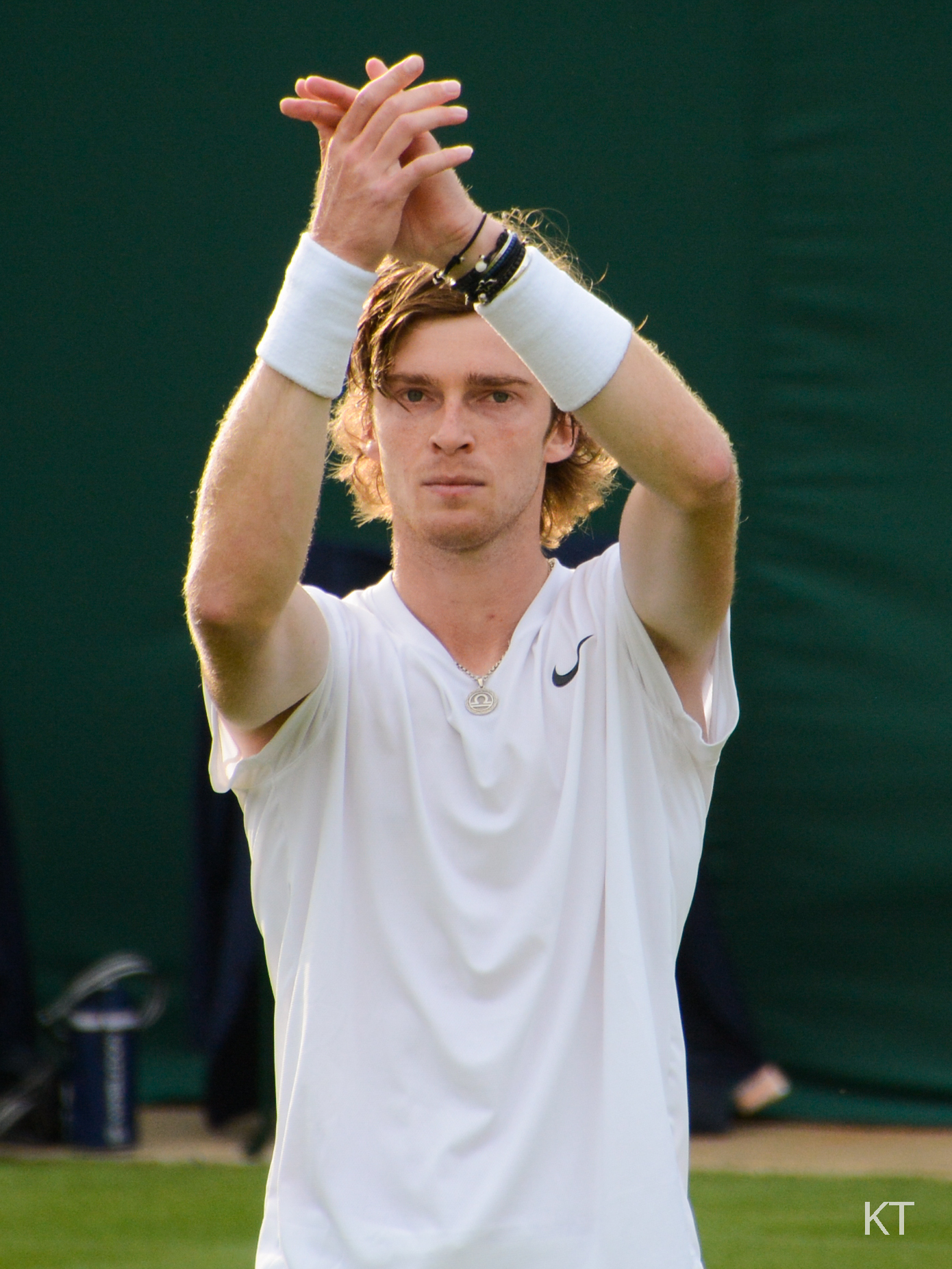
Rublev at the 2021 Wimbledon Championships

Rublev started his 2021 season with a title at the ATP Cup, a country-based team event. Playing for Russia, in a team with Daniil Medvedev, Aslan Karatsev, and Evgeny Donskoy, Rublev bested Argentina's Guido Pella and Japan's Yoshihito Nishioka in the group stage to help his team advance into the semifinals. There he defeated Jan-Lennard Struff, coming back from a set down to win. In the final of the ATP Cup, Rublev beat Fabio Fognini in straight sets.

Rublev advanced to the quarterfinals of the Australian Open after defeating Yannick Hanfmann, Thiago Monteiro, Feliciano López, and Casper Ruud.

Rublev then won the Rotterdam Open, defeating Márton Fucsovics in the final. He also bested top-ten player Tsitsipas en route to the final. With this title, Rublev reached a twenty match winning streak at ATP Tour 500 tournaments, which is the third longest ATP 500 winning streak in tennis history.

The next week, he went on to win doubles at the Qatar Open partnering Aslan Karatsev but lost his first singles match to Roberto Bautista Agut in the semifinal. Rublev's previous rounds were won by walkovers due to his opponents' injuries. The week after at Dubai, he extended his winning streak to twenty one matches with his victory over Emil Ruusuvuori in the second round. With this 21st consecutive win at ATP 500 events, Rublev tied Andy Murray for the second-longest winning streak at the tournament level (since 2009) and also second overall, the only other player to own a longer run of ATP 500 victories being Roger Federer (28). Rublev went on to reach the semifinals defeating Taylor Fritz and Márton Fucsovics in the quarterfinals (for the third time in 2021), losing to wildcard and eventual champion Aslan Karatsev in the semifinals.

In April, seeded fourth, Rublev reached his first semifinal at a Masters 1000 level at the 2021 Miami Open where he was defeated by the eventual champion Hubert Hurkacz.

In Monte-Carlo, Rublev reached his first singles Masters 1000 final, defeating 11-time champion Rafael Nadal en route. Although he lost to Tsitsipas in the championship match, he reached a career-high of world No. 7 and overtook Roger Federer in the rankings for the first time in his career.

At the French Open, Rublev was upset in the first round in five sets by Jan-Lennard Struff.

At Wimbledon, Rublev reached the fourth round for the first time in his career defeating 26th seed Fabio Fognini. This marked the first time three Russian players reached the fourth round at the All England Club since 2006, when Elena Dementieva, Anastasia Myskina and Maria Sharapova made their run. He was finally defeated by Márton Fucsovics whom he beat in five consecutive meetings between the two since his win at the 2020 French Open including Fucsovics's withdrawal in Qatar.

At the 2020 Tokyo Olympics, he won the mixed doubles title with Anastasia Pavlyuchenkova defeating compatriots Aslan Karatsev and Elena Vesnina in the final. Rublev was playing mixed doubles for the first time in his professional career and has no plans to continue until the next Olympics.

At the Western & Southern Open, Rublev reached his second Masters 1000 final defeating Marin Čilić, Gaël Monfils, Benoît Paire in the quarterfinals and compatriot and top seed Daniil Medvedev in the semifinal, his maiden win over the world No. 2 and the biggest win of his career. In the final, he lost to Alexander Zverev in straight sets. The match, lasting just 59 minutes, was the shortest final contested in the history of the tournament.

At the US Open, Rublev was seeded fifth in lieu of the absence of such players as Rafael Nadal and Dominic Thiem. He lost in the third round in five sets to Frances Tiafoe of the United States. As a result of this run, he made his top 5 debut on 13 September 2021.

At San Diego, he reached his eighth semifinal of the year defeating sixth seed Diego Schwartzman.

At Indian Wells, he reached the final in doubles partnering Aslan Karatsev where they were defeated by John Peers/Filip Polášek duo. As a result, he reached a new career-high ranking in doubles of No. 59 on 18 October 2021.

=== 2022: Four titles, ATP Finals semifinalist ===
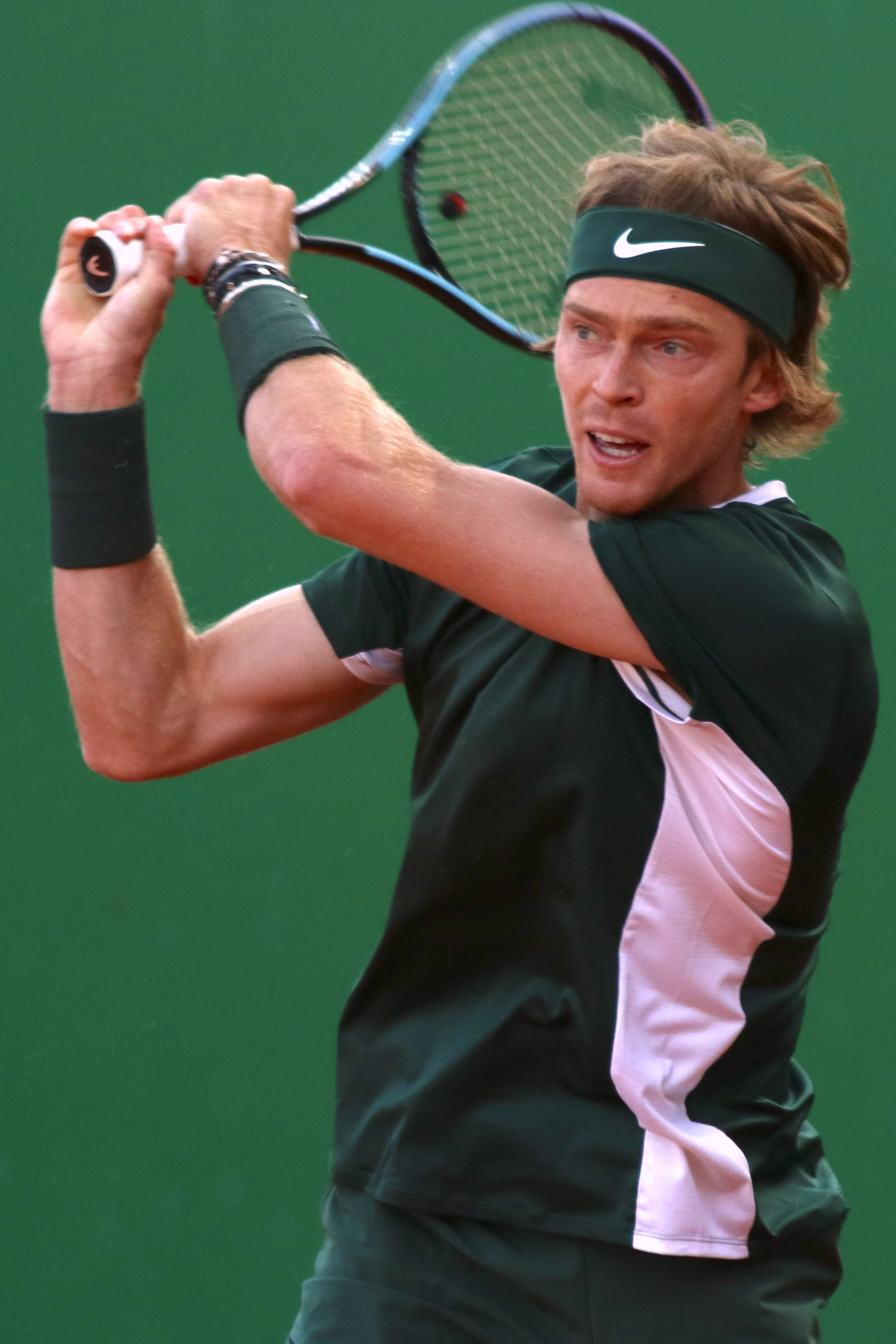
Rublev at the 2022 Monte-Carlo Masters

Rublev reached the third round of the 2022 Australian Open where he was defeated by Marin Čilić.

Rublev reached his first final of 2022 at the Open 13 in Marseille, defeating three French players en route Richard Gasquet, Lucas Pouille and ninth seed Benjamin Bonzi with all matches going to three sets. He defeated world No. 9, Félix Auger-Aliassime, for his ninth singles title. At the same tournament he reached the quarterfinals with Ukrainian Denys Molchanov. The duo won against the French pair of Bonzi/Albano Olivetti to reach the semifinals and Hugo Gaston/Holger Rune to reach also the final. He lifted the doubles trophy as well just hours after winning the singles to make it a Marseille double against South African Raven Klaasen and Japanese Ben McLachlan. With the victory, he became just the third player to sweep both the singles and doubles titles in the tournament's 30-year history.

On 26 February, Rublev won the Dubai Championships defeating Czech player Jiří Veselý in straight sets to gain his tenth ATP singles title. Rublev also made international news headlines when, after winning his semifinal match, he wrote "No war please" on a camera lens a few days into the Russian invasion of Ukraine.

Next, Rublev defeated 33rd seed Grigor Dimitrov in the quarterfinals at the Indian Wells Open, before losing in straight sets to the 20th seed and eventual champion, Taylor Fritz.

In April 2022, Rublev defeated in three sets world No. 1 ranked Novak Djokovic, in the final of Serbia Open. At Roland Garros, Rublev reached the quarterfinals where he lost in a fifth set tiebreak to 20th seed Marin Čilić.

The All England Club announced a ban on all Russian and Belarusian players, including Rublev, from competing at the 2022 Wimbledon Championships due to the Russian invasion of Ukraine.

Seeded ninth at the US Open he reached the fourth round, defeating 19th seed Denis Shapovalov in a five set thriller with a fifth set super tiebreak lasting over four hours, for the fourth time at this major. Next, he defeated seventh seed Cameron Norrie in straight sets to reach the quarterfinals, where he was subsequently defeated by Frances Tiafoe.

Rublev won his fourth title of the year at the Gijón Open in Spain where he defeated Sebastian Korda in straight sets.

Seeded sixth, the world No. 7 Rublev qualified for his third ATP Finals in a row and reached the semifinals for the first time defeating two former season finale champions world No. 5, Daniil Medvedev, and world No. 3, Stefanos Tsitsipas, to set up a meeting with world No. 4, Casper Ruud. In the semifinal, he lost in straight sets to Ruud.

=== 2023: Monte-Carlo title, three major quarterfinals ===
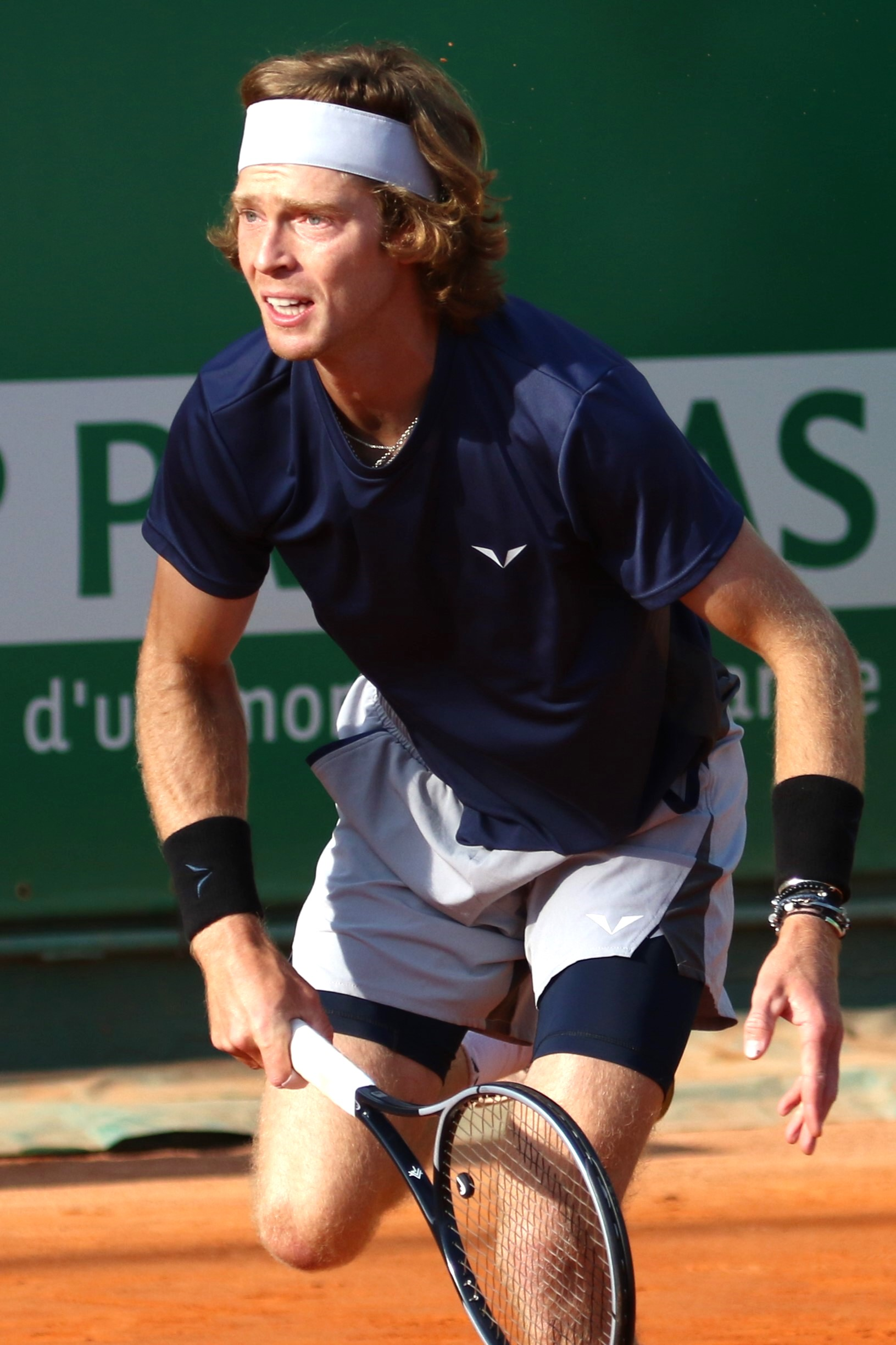
Rublev at the 2023 Monte-Carlo Masters

Rublev advanced to the quarterfinals of the Australian Open for the second time, where he then lost to eventual champion Novak Djokovic, winning just seven games.

Rublev reached his first final of the year in Dubai as the defending champion defeating Filip Krajinović, Alejandro Davidovich Fokina, Botic van de Zandschulp & Alexander Zverev (for the first time) before losing to Daniil Medvedev.

In Monte-Carlo he recorded his 250th career win by defeating Jaume Munar. Rublev became the 25th active men's player to record 250 career wins, the ninth man born in 1990 or later to achieve the feat, and just the fourth man born in 1995 or later to do it after Alexander Zverev, Daniil Medvedev and Stefanos Tsitsipas. Following wins over Karen Khachanov, Jan-Lennard Struff, Taylor Fritz and Holger Rune he lifted his first Masters 1000 trophy, the biggest of his career. In the final, Rublev defeated Rune in three sets, coming from 1–4 down in the third set to claim victory.

At the Banja Luka Open, he reached his second consecutive clay-court final following wins over Juan Pablo Varillas, Damir Džumhur, and Alex Molčan, but lost to Dušan Lajović in the final in three sets. Next, at the Madrid Open, he reached the fourth round in singles but lost to compatriot Karen Khachanov. In doubles, the pair went on to win the title after defeating seventh seeds Matthew Ebden/Rohan Bopanna in the final.

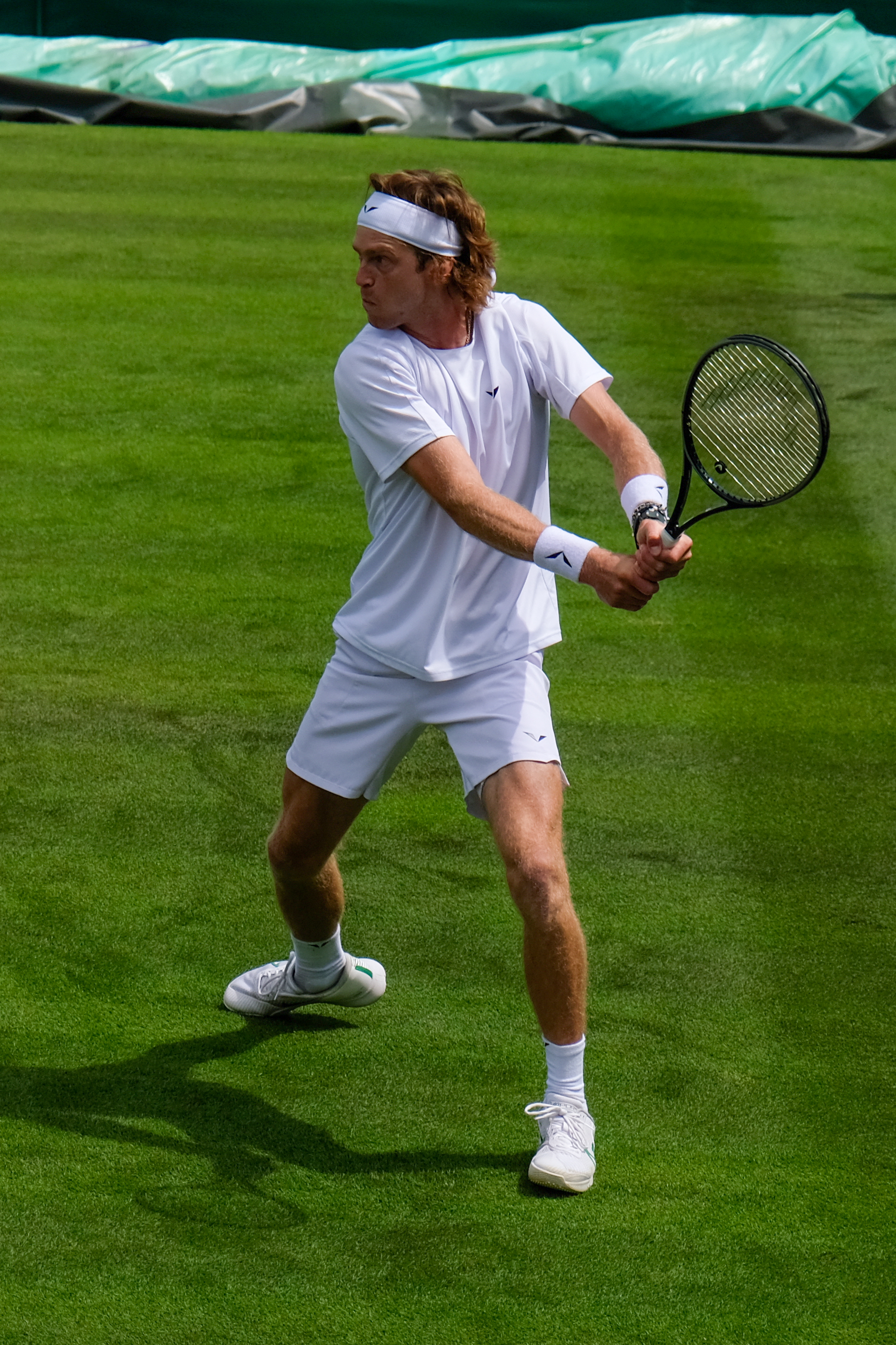
Rublev at the 2023 Wimbledon Championships

He reached the quarterfinals at Wimbledon for the first time in his career, defeating Max Purcell, Aslan Karatsev, David Goffin & Alexander Bublik, before losing to Novak Djokovic in four sets. Rublev won the Swedish Open, defeating Casper Ruud in the final.

Seeded eight at the US Open, Rublev lost to Daniil Medvedev in the quarterfinals, becoming the first player to lose his first nine major quarterfinals.

Seeded fifth at the China Open, he reached the second round defeating Cameron Norrie but lost to Ugo Humbert. At the same tournament, in doubles he reached the semifinals with Karen Khachanov. Also seeded fifth at the Shanghai Masters, he defeated this time 32nd seed Ugo Humbert and 18th seed Grigor Dimitrov to reach his second Masters final of the season. He became the only player, male or female, to record 50 wins in each of the past three years. He lost in the final to 16th seed Hubert Hurkacz.

=== 2024: Madrid Open title, 300th win ===
As the top seed in Hong Kong, Rublev won his first title of the season, defeating Liam Broady, Arthur Fils, Shang Juncheng, and Emil Ruusuvuori. At the Australian Open, Rublev reached the quarterfinals, but lost to fourth seed and eventual champion Jannik Sinner. En route to the quarterfinal, Rublev recorded his 300th win, defeating tenth seed Alex de Minaur from 2–1 down and winning in five sets to reach his tenth major quarterfinal. He became the eighth man born in 1990 or later to reach this milestone, and the fourth man born in 1995 or later to do so after Alexander Zverev, Daniil Medvedev and Stefanos Tsitsipas.

Seeded second in Rotterdam, Rublev defeated Zizou Bergs and Félix Auger-Aliassime before losing to Alex de Minaur in the quarterfinals. As the top seed in Doha, Rublev received a bye into the second round and beat Richard Gasquet before being upset by world No. 116 Jakub Menšík in the quarterfinals. Seeded second in Dubai, Rublev reached the semifinals after a defeat over Arthur Cazaux and an early retirement by Sebastian Korda. At 5–6 in the third set of the semifinals against Alexander Bublik, Rublev was defaulted for verbally abusing a line judge. However, the ATP later restored Rublev's ranking points and prize money from the tournament.

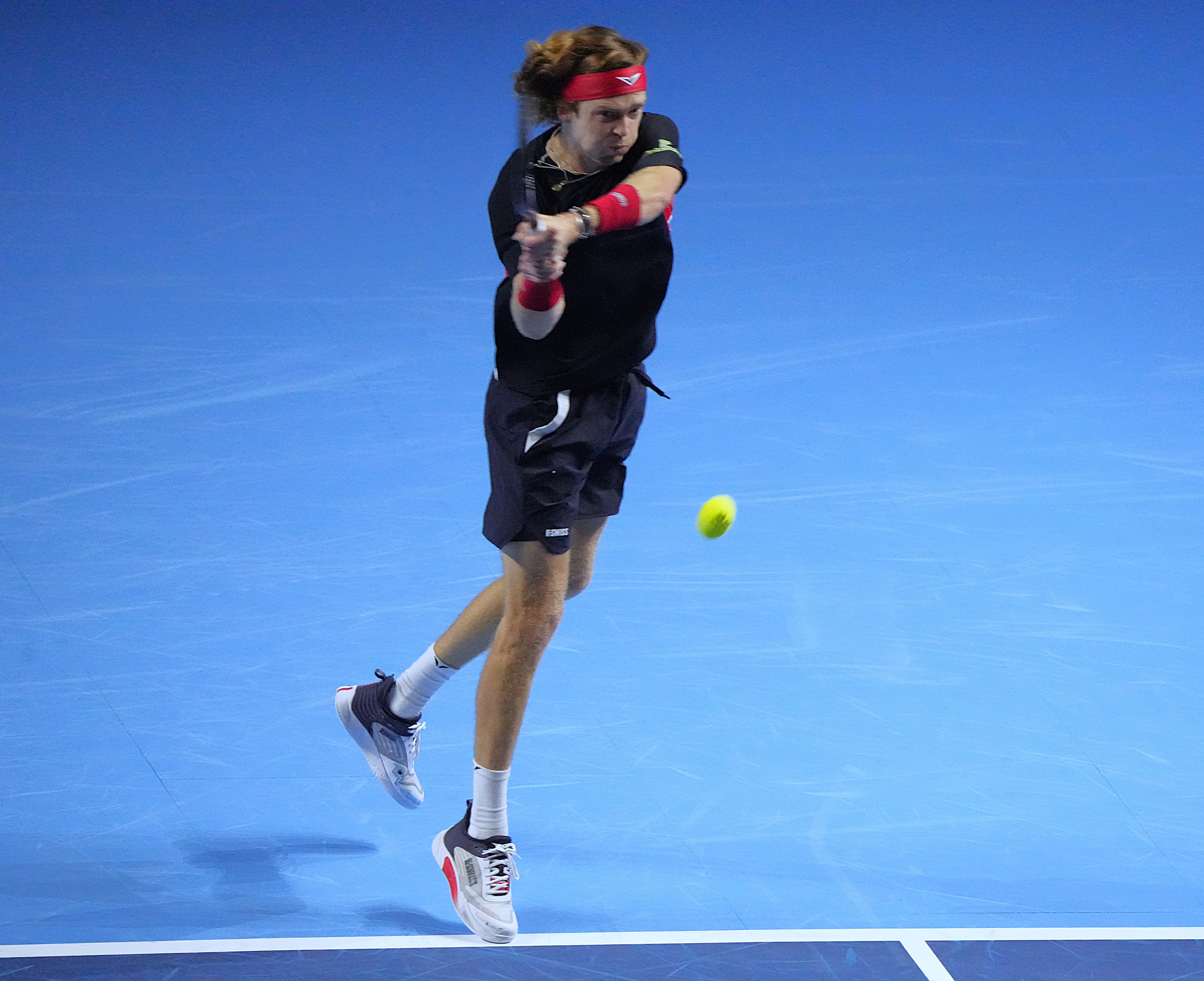
Andrei Andrejewitsch Rubljow, ATP Basel 2024.

After his default in Dubai, Rublev struggled with form. Seeded fifth in Indian Wells, Rublev beat Andy Murray before losing to 32nd seed Jiří Lehečka. In Miami, Rublev received a bye into the second round and was upset by world No. 60 Tomáš Macháč. Defending his title in Monte-Carlo, he received a bye into the second round before losing to 46th ranked Alexei Popyrin in straight sets. As the top seed in Barcelona after Carlos Alcaraz's withdrawal, Rublev fell to world No. 87 Brandon Nakashima. However, Rublev returned to form in Madrid and won his second Masters 1000 title after defeating Facundo Bagnis, Alejandro Davidovich Fokina, Tallon Griekspoor, second seed Carlos Alcaraz, Taylor Fritz, and Félix Auger-Aliassime in the final. With this win, Rublev became the only man to win in both singles and doubles in Madrid. At the French Open, Rublev defeated Taro Daniel and Pedro Martínez, but was upset by Matteo Arnaldi in the third round, marking his second consecutive third-round exit at the tournament.

Rublev began his grass season seeded fourth in Halle, but was upset in the first round by Marcos Giron. He was also defeated in the first round at the 2024 Wimbledon Championships by major debutant Francisco Comesaña.

At the 2024 National Bank Open, he first reached the quarterfinals with wins over Tomas Martin Etcheverry and qualifier Brandon Nakashima and completed the career set of both Masters and Grand Slam quarterfinals becoming the first man born in 1997 or later to achieve the feat and the third man born in 1990 or later, after 1991-born Grigor Dimitrov and 1996-born Daniil Medvedev. He was also the seventh man after Dominic Thiem (1993), Stefanos Tsitsipas (1998), Alexander Zverev (1997), Grigor Dimitrov (1991), Daniil Medvedev (1996) and Hubert Hurkacz (1997), all born after 1990, to complete the nine Masters 1000 career set. He subsequently reached the semifinals for the first time in Canada, having played two matches on the same day, with an upset over top seed and defending champion Jannik Sinner, recording his second win over a world No. 1. He reached his sixth Masters 1000 final defeating Matteo Arnaldi in straight sets, but was upset by Alexei Popyrin. At the end of the season, Rublev was ranked number 8 in the world.

=== 2025: Doha title, new coaching ===
At the 2025 Australian Open, Rublev lost in straight sets to 18-year-old Brazilian prospect João Fonseca at his Grand Slam tournament debut.

The Russian won his first title of the season in Doha defeating Alexander Bublik, Nuno Borges, Alex de Minaur with which he earned his first top 10 win of the season, Félix Auger-Aliassime & Jack Draper in the final. With his title win, he finally won a tournament twice after winning 16 different titles.

Ahead of the clay season, Marat Safin joined as the new head coach of Rublev's team. As the defending champion at Madrid, Rublev was defeated by Bublik in the third round, and his ranking fell sharply to No. 17, his lowest since January 2020.

At the 2025 French Open, he lost in straight sets to top seed Jannik Sinner in the fourth round. He also reached the fourth round at Wimbledon and lost to Carlos Alcaraz in four sets.

During the North American hard-court swing, Rublev reached the semifinals of the Los Cabos Open, where he was defeated by American Aleksandar Kovacevic. He then competed at the Washington Open, but his campaign ended in the second round following a loss to 19-year-old American Learner Tien. Rublev later reached the quarterfinals of the Canadian Open and the Cincinnati Open, losing at both tournaments before the semifinals.

At the 2025 US Open, Rublev advanced to the fourth round after defeating Tristan Boyer and Coleman Wong in the second and third rounds. His run ended against Félix Auger-Aliassime, who defeated him in straight sets, 7–5, 6–3, 6–4. This marked Rublev's third consecutive appearance in the fourth round of a Grand Slam tournament that season.

Rublev's results during the Asian hard-court swing were less successful, with early exits at the Hangzhou Open, China Open and Shanghai Masters. He also suffered a first-round defeat to Cameron Norrie at the Vienna Open. He ended his season at the Paris Masters, reaching the round of 16 before losing to Ben Shelton.

=== 2026: Mixed results; 1 title and 2 finals ===
Rublev at the 2026 Cincinnati Open

Rublev began the season by reaching the semifinals of the Hong Kong Open. At the Australian Open, he advanced to the third round before losing. He then reached the semifinals of both the Qatar Open and the Dubai Tennis Championships. His campaigns at Indian Wells and the Miami Open ended in the opening rounds.

During the European clay-court season, Rublev reached the final of the Barcelona Open, where he finished as runner-up. He was eliminated in the opening round at the Madrid Open, before reaching the quarterfinals of the Italian Open. At the French Open, he advanced to the fourth round.

Rublev's grass-court results were shorter, as he exited in the opening rounds at the Halle Open and Wimbledon. He returned to clay for the Nordea Open, where he won the title after defeating Luciano Darderi in the final, 6–4, 6–3. The victory marked his first ATP Tour title of the season. He later reached the quarterfinals of the Estoril Open.

During the North American hard-court swing, Rublev lost in the opening rounds of the Canadian Open and Cincinnati Open. At the 2026 US Open, he defeated Otto Virtanen in the first round but was eliminated in the second round by Daniel Mérida.

Rublev returned to the final at the Hangzhou Open, where he faced fellow Russian Daniil Medvedev. Medvedev won the match 7–5, 6–4 to claim the title. Rublev subsequently reached the quarterfinals of the China Open, but exited in the opening rounds at the Shanghai Masters, Almaty Open and Vienna Open. He ended his season at the Paris Masters, where he was eliminated in the first round.

== Playing style ==
Rublev is an offensive baseliner with a big forehand – his favorite shot — and he has a dangerous but somewhat inconsistent two-handed backhand. His running forehand is particularly lethal because of his consistency and comfort with the shot, making many passing shots with it. Despite his power, Rublev is often hyper-aggressive and can enter situations where he makes consecutive unforced errors, causing technical and mental difficulty to follow. However, he can also demonstrate periods when his forehand is consistent and overpowering. He states that he does not prefer a particular tennis surface.

Rublev has a powerful first serve that often reaches 200+ km/h (125+ mph). His second serve, however, is underwhelming because of his high number of double faults during matches, as well as being much slower than his first serve. In 2020, Yevgeny Kafelnikov said the following about Rublev's game: "I think his whole game, it just has some elements of playing junior tennis, hitting the ball harder and harder. If he improves in those two departments, his footwork and second serve, his whole game is going to change."

== Endorsements ==
Rublev has been endorsed by Head for racquets, Italian luxury brand Bulgari for watches He used to be endorsed by Wilson for racquets and by Nike for apparel and shoes. In 2023, Rublev launched his own clothing brand Rublo, that is "not about clothes". Rublo has been created to drive awareness around equality and kindness with the hope of making our world a better place, as he claims. K-Swiss has been on the brand's list of collaborations since August 2024. In July 2025, Ra Optics released their new frames, a limited-edition collaboration with Rublev.

== Personal life ==
Outside tennis, Rublev practices boxing and basketball. Rublev also creates his own electronic music like his idols – Martin Garrix and Alan Walker. Rublev is nicknamed the "Rublo'", akin to the Russian word 'ruble'. He is also sometimes affectionately referred to as "Bweh", a reference to his grunt. He speaks Russian, English, and Spanish, and he is a longtime fan of the Golden State Warriors (NBA) and a supporter of FC Barcelona.

Rublev is an Orthodox Christian and can be regularly seen crossing himself after matches. He is the godfather to Daniil Medvedev’s daughter, Alisa.

== Career statistics ==
=== Grand Slam tournament performance timeline ===
Key
W	F	SF	QF	#R	RR	Q#	DNQ	A	NH

(W) winner; (F) finalist; (SF) semifinalist; (QF) quarterfinalist; (#R) rounds 4, 3, 2, 1; (RR) round-robin stage; (Q#) qualification round; (DNQ) did not qualify; (A) absent; (NH) not held; (SR) strike rate (events won / competed); (W–L) win–loss record.
To avoid confusion and double counting, these charts are updated at the conclusion of a tournament or when the player's participation has ended.

Current through the 2026 US Open.

Tournament	2014	2015	2016	2017	2018	2019	2020	2021	2022	2023	2024	2025	2026	SR	W–L	Win %
Australian Open	A	A	A	2R	3R	1R	4R	QF	3R	QF	QF	1R	3R	0 / 10	22–10	69%
French Open	A	A	Q2	1R	A	A	QF	1R	QF	3R	3R	4R (Note: Rublev received a walkover in the third round of the 2025 French Open against Arthur Fils, which does not officially count as a win.)	4R	0 / 7	17–8	68%
Wimbledon	A	Q2	Q2	2R	A	2R	NH	4R	A (Note: Russian athletes were banned from competing following the 2022 Russian invasion of Ukraine.)	QF	1R	4R	1R	0 / 7	12–7	63%
US Open	A	1R	Q1	QF	1R	4R	QF	3R	QF	QF	4R	4R	2R	0 / 11	28–11	72%
Win–loss	0–0	0–1	0–0	6–4	2–2	4–3	11–3	9–4	10–3	14–4	9–4	8–4	6–4	0 / 35	79–36	69%

=== ATP Masters 1000 ===
==== Singles: 6 (2 titles, 4 runner-ups) ====
Result	Year	Tournament	Surface	Opponent	Score
Loss	2021	Monte-Carlo Masters	Clay	(Greece) Stefanos Tsitsipas	3–6, 3–6
Loss	2021	Cincinnati Open	Hard	(Germany) Alexander Zverev	2–6, 3–6
Win	2023	Monte-Carlo Masters	Clay	(Denmark) Holger Rune	5–7, 6–2, 7–5
Loss	2023	Shanghai Masters	Hard	(Poland) Hubert Hurkacz	3–6, 6–3, 6–7^{(8–10)}
Win	2024	Madrid Open	Clay	(Canada) Félix Auger-Aliassime	4–6, 7–5, 7–5
Loss	2024	Canadian Open	Hard	(Australia) Alexei Popyrin	2–6, 4–6

==== Doubles: 4 (1 title, 3 runner-ups) ====
Result	Year	Tournament	Surface	Partner	Opponents	Score
Loss	2018	Miami Open	Hard	(Russia) Karen Khachanov	(United States) Bob Bryan (United States) Mike Bryan	6–4, 6–7^{(5–7)}, [4–10]
Loss	2019	Paris Masters	Hard	(Russia) Karen Khachanov	(France) Pierre-Hugues Herbert (France) Nicolas Mahut	4–6, 1–6
Loss	2021	Indian Wells Open	Hard	(Russia) Aslan Karatsev	(Australia) John Peers (Slovakia) Filip Polášek	3–6, 6–7^{(5–7)}
Win	2023	Madrid Open	Clay	Karen Khachanov	(India) Rohan Bopanna (Australia) Matthew Ebden	6–3, 3–6, [10–3]

=== Summer Olympics ===
==== Mixed doubles: 1 (gold medal) ====
Result	Year	Tournament	Surface	Partner	Opponents	Score
Gold	2021	2020 Tokyo Summer Olympics	Hard	(Russia) Anastasia Pavlyuchenkova	(Russia) Elena Vesnina (Russia) Aslan Karatsev	6–3, 6–7^{(5–7)}, [13–11]

=== Records ===
- These records were attained in the Open Era of tennis.

Tournament	Year	Record accomplished	Player tied
Croatia Open	2017	Winning an ATP tournament as lucky loser	Heinz Günthardt; Bill Scanlon; Francisco Clavet; Christian Miniussi; Sergiy Stakhovsky; Rajeev Ram; Leonardo Mayer; Marco Cecchinato; Kwon Soon-woo
Australian Open / French Open / Wimbledon / US Open	2017–2024	Lost first ten Grand Slam quarterfinals	Stands alone

== Awards and honours ==
International

- ITF Junior World Champion: 2014.
- ATP Most Improved Player: 2020.

National

- The Russian Cup in the nominations:
  - Team of the Year – Boys Under-16: 2013; (Note: (as part of the Team: Roman Safiullin, Evgenii Tiurnev; captain Ivan Pridankin))
  - Junior of the Year: 2014;
  - Olympians-2020;
  - Team of the Year: 2019, 2021.
- Sports title "Merited Master of Sports of Russia" (6 August 2021)
- Order of Friendship (11 August 2021)

== Notes ==
Sporting positions
Preceded by (South Korea) Chung Hyeon	Orange Bowl Boys' Singles Champion; Category: 16 and under 2012	Succeeded by (South Korea) Chung Yun-seong
Awards and achievements
Preceded by (Germany) Alexander Zverev	ITF Junior World Champion; 2014	Succeeded by (United States) Taylor Fritz
Preceded by (Italy) Matteo Berrettini	ATP Most Improved Player; 2020	Succeeded by (Russia) Aslan Karatsev
Preceded by (Austria) Dominic Thiem	Arthur Ashe Humanitarian of the Year; 2025	Succeeded by Incumbent
