= 2018 Novak Djokovic tennis season =

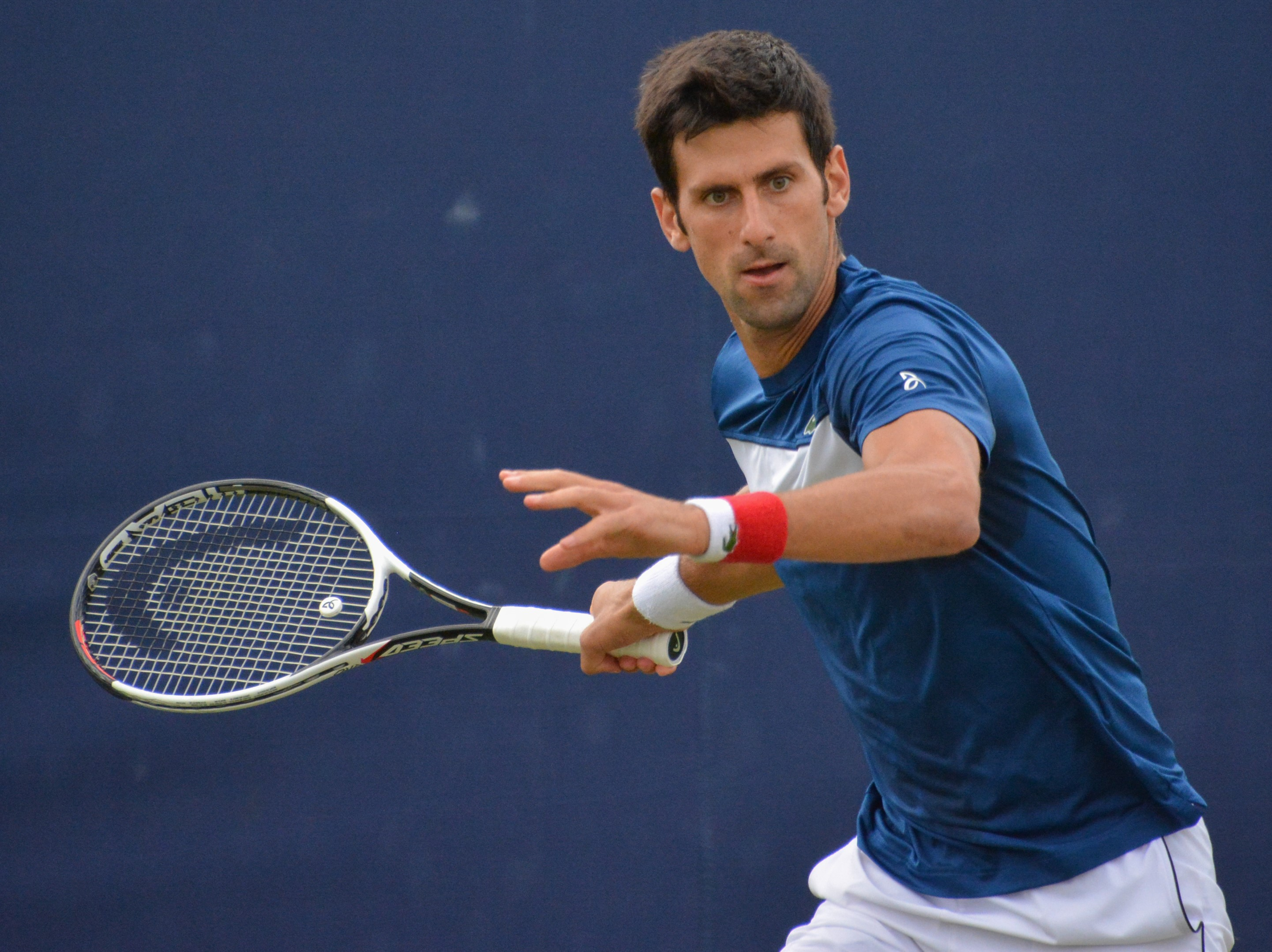
- Djokovic at the 2018 Queen's Club Championships
- Full name: Novak Djokovic
- Country: Serbia
- Calendar prize money: $15,967,184 (singles & doubles)

Singles
- Season record: 53–13 (80%)
- Calendar titles: 4
- Year-end ranking: No. 1
- Ranking change from previous year: ▲11

Grand Slam & significant results
- Australian Open: 4R
- French Open: QF
- Wimbledon: W
- US Open: W
- Other tournaments
- Tour Finals: F

Doubles
- Season record: 2–4
- Calendar titles: 0
- Current ranking: 268
- Year-end ranking: ▼34

The 2018 Novak Djokovic tennis season started with the Tie Break Tens event in Melbourne, Australia.

== Yearly summary ==
=== Early Hard Court Season ===
==== Australian Open ====
Djokovic played his first official match since Wimbledon at the Australian Open. After defeating Donald Young in straight sets, he defeated Gaël Monfils in the second round after dropping the first set, with Monfils succumbing to extreme heat in the latter stages of the match. With a victory over Albert Ramos Viñolas in third round, Djokovic set up a meeting with Korean Chung Hyeon. In a match of constant breaks of serve, Djokovic eventually lost in straight sets due to relentless backcourt defense from Chung and copious unforced errors on critical points. After his loss, Djokovic decided to undergo a surgery on his right elbow, which he claimed was affecting him from previous two years.

==== Indian Wells Open ====
Djokovic surprisingly returned to tour after his surgery, playing at the Indian Wells Masters. After receiving a first round bye, he was upset in the second round by World No. 109 Taro Daniel in three sets.

==== Miami Open ====
Djokovic's next event was at the Miami Open, where his spring slump continued as he lost to Benoît Paire in straight sets.

=== Clay Court Season ===
==== Monte Carlo Masters ====
Hoping to regain form at the clay court events, Djokovic played at the Monte Carlo Masters. He won his first two matches in straight sets, defeating Dušan Lajović and Borna Ćorić in first and second rounds respectively. His 6–0, 6–1 win over Lajović was particularly dominant and suggested significant improvements in form. He needed 10 match points to beat Coric in round 2. In the third round, he lost to World No. 7 and clay court specialist Dominic Thiem. After the match, Djokovic stated : "After two years finally I can play without pain".

==== Barcelona Open ====
Inspired by his improvement, Djokovic took a wildcard to play at Barcelona Open He was unable to carry on his run there, and lost to Martin Klizan in his opening round match.

==== Madrid Open ====
Djokovic next competed at the Madrid Open. In his first victory over a top-20 opponent in over eight months, he defeated former World No. 5 Kei Nishikori in the first round, before falling to Briton Kyle Edmund. As a result of the loss and failing to defend his semifinals position at the event, Djokovic fell to No. 18, his lowest ranking in twelve years.

==== Italian Open ====
Djokovic's next event was the Italian Open, where he has previously won four times and was the defending finalist. He progressed to his first quarterfinals appearance since 2017 Wimbledon, defeating Alexandr Dolgopolov, Nikoloz Basilashvili and Albert Ramos in straight sets. He would go on to beat Kei Nishikori, but lose to eventual champion Rafael Nadal in the semifinal. After failing to defend his finalist points from 2017, Djokovic's ranking fell to No. 22. This was his first time out of the top 20 since October 2006.

==== French Open ====
At the French Open, Djokovic beat Roberto Bautista Agut and Fernando Verdasco en route to the quarterfinals, where he suffered a shocking defeat to Marco Cecchinato in four sets.

=== Grass Court Season ===
==== Queen's Club ====
Djokovic took a wildcard to play at Queen's Club for the first time since 2010. He beat second seed Grigor Dimitrov, Adrian Mannarino, and Jérémy Chardy to reach the final. In the final, he lost to Marin Čilić in three sets, despite holding a match point.

==== Wimbledon ====
Showing further improvement in form, Djokovic beat Australian Open quarter-finalist Tennys Sandgren, British number one Kyle Edmund, and Kei Nishikori to set up a semifinal against Rafael Nadal. In the second longest Wimbledon semifinal to date (second only to the first semifinal between Isner and Anderson), Djokovic beat Nadal in five sets played over two days due to Wimbledons 11pm curfew and the first semifinal delaying the start of the Djokovic Nadal semifinal to after 8PM local time.

He then defeated Kevin Anderson in the final in straight sets to win his fourth Wimbledon title and 13th overall Grand Slam title. This was his first title of the season, which catapulted him from 21st back into the 10th spot in the rankings. He also became the lowest ranked male player to win a Wimbledon title since Goran Ivanišević won it in 2001 as a wildcard.

=== US Open Series ===
==== Canadian Open ====
Djokovic started his US Open series campaign with straightforward wins against Mirza Bašić and Peter Polansky in Toronto, but fell in the third round to Stefanos Tsitsipas.

==== Cincinnati Open ====
Next for Djokovic was the Cincinnati Open, the only Masters 1000 tournament he hadn't won. After beating Steve Johnson in straight sets, Djokovic faced several difficult matches in a row. He had to come back from a one-set deficit against Adrian Mannarino and ATP number 5 Grigor Dimitrov, and needed three sets to beat Milos Raonic in the quarterfinals and Marin Čilić in the semifinals.

Djokovic then beat top-seeded and number 2 ranked Roger Federer in straight sets in the final. It was their first match since their semifinal match at the 2016 Australian Open. With this win, Djokovic became the first singles player to complete the Career Golden Masters.

==== US Open ====
Struggling with the heat and humidity, Djokovic survived an upset scare and beat Márton Fucsovics in four sets in the first round. He would again need four sets to overcome Tennys Sandgren in the second round. With cooler conditions, the next rounds proved to be easier: Richard Gasquet in the third round, João Sousa, and John Millman in the quarterfinal were all defeated in straight sets.

He would then face Kei Nishikori in their first match at the US Open since Nishikori's upset over Djokovic in 2014. This time Djokovic prevailed in straight sets to set up a final against Juan Martín del Potro. In the final, Djokovic took control of the match early, winning the first set and securing a break early in the second. However, a spirited comeback from del Potro prolonged the second set, with Djokovic winning in a tiebreaker after a 95-minute set. Djokovic eventually closed out the match in straight sets.

The victory earned Djokovic his third US Open and 14th Grand Slam title overall, tying Pete Sampras. He also climbed back to number 3 in the ATP rankings and qualified for the ATP Finals.

=== Fall hard court season ===
==== Shanghai Masters ====
Seeded second at the Shanghai Masters, he defeated Jérémy Chardy, 16th seed Marco Cecchinato, 7th seed Kevin Anderson, 4th seed Alexander Zverev, and 13th seed Borna Ćorić in a decisive run. He did not drop a set nor have his serve broken during the tournament. This was his fourth title in Shanghai and second Masters title of the year. With this win, he overtook Roger Federer and returned to the #2 ranking for the first time since the 2017 French Open.

==== Paris Masters ====
Djokovic defeated João Sousa, Damir Džumhur, Marin Čilić, and his rival Roger Federer en route to the final, where he lost in straight sets to Karen Khachanov.

However, with Rafael Nadal's withdrawal from the tournament, Djokovic regained the No. 1 ranking after the tournament concluded. It was exactly two years ago when he lost the No. 1 ranking in Paris, following a quarterfinals exit.

==== ATP Finals ====
Djokovic easily qualified for the semifinals, winning all 3 of his round robin matches in straight sets and without losing serve. He defeated John Isner, Sascha Zverev and Marin Cilic. In the semifinals he defeated Wimbledon runner up Kevin Anderson in straight sets. In the final he faced Sascha Zverev, who Djokovic beat four days earlier in round robin play. This time Zverev came out on top in straight sets for his first ATP Finals title.

== All matches ==
This table lists all the matches of Djokovic this year, including walkovers W/O (they are marked ND for non-decision)

Key
W	F	SF	QF	#R	RR	Q#	P#	DNQ	A	Z#	PO	G	S	B	NMS	NTI	P	NH

(W) winner; (F) finalist; (SF) semifinalist; (QF) quarterfinalist; (#R) rounds 4, 3, 2, 1; (RR) round-robin stage; (Q#) qualification round; (P#) preliminary round; (DNQ) did not qualify; (A) absent; (Z#) Davis/Fed Cup Zonal Group (with number indication) or (PO) play-off; (G) gold, (S) silver or (B) bronze Olympic/Paralympic medal; (NMS) not a Masters tournament; (NTI) not a Tier I tournament; (P) postponed; (NH) not held; (SR) strike rate (events won / competed); (W–L) win–loss record.
To avoid confusion and double counting, these charts are updated at the conclusion of a tournament or when the player's participation has ended.

=== Singles matches ===
Tournament	Match	Round	Opponent (seed or key)	Rank	Result	Score
Australian Open; Melbourne, Australia; Grand Slam tournament Hard, outdoor 15 – 28 January 2018
Australian Open; Melbourne, Australia; Grand Slam tournament Hard, outdoor 15 – 28 January 2018	1 / 947	1R	(United States) Donald Young	63	Win	6–1, 6–4, 6–2
Australian Open; Melbourne, Australia; Grand Slam tournament Hard, outdoor 15 – 28 January 2018	2 / 948	2R	(France) Gaël Monfils	39	Win	4–6, 6–3, 6–1, 6–3
Australian Open; Melbourne, Australia; Grand Slam tournament Hard, outdoor 15 – 28 January 2018	3 / 949	3R	(Spain) Albert Ramos Viñolas (21)	22	Win	6–2, 6–3, 6–3
Australian Open; Melbourne, Australia; Grand Slam tournament Hard, outdoor 15 – 28 January 2018	4 / 950	4R	(South Korea) Chung Hyeon	58	Loss	6–7^{(4–7)}, 5–7, 6–7^{(3–7)}
Indian Wells Masters; Indian Wells, United States; ATP 1000; Hard, outdoor 5 – 18 March 2018
Indian Wells Masters; Indian Wells, United States; ATP 1000; Hard, outdoor 5 – 18 March 2018	–	1R	Bye			
Indian Wells Masters; Indian Wells, United States; ATP 1000; Hard, outdoor 5 – 18 March 2018	5 / 951	2R	(Japan) Taro Daniel	109	Loss	6–7^{(3–7)}, 6–4, 1–6
Miami Open; Miami, United States; ATP 1000; Hard, outdoor 19 March – 1 April 2018
Miami Open; Miami, United States; ATP 1000; Hard, outdoor 19 March – 1 April 2018	–	1R	Bye			
Miami Open; Miami, United States; ATP 1000; Hard, outdoor 19 March – 1 April 2018	6 / 952	2R	(France) Benoît Paire	47	Loss	3–6, 4–6
Monte-Carlo Masters; Monte Carlo, Monaco; ATP 1000; Clay, outdoor 15 – 22 April 2018
Monte-Carlo Masters; Monte Carlo, Monaco; ATP 1000; Clay, outdoor 15 – 22 April 2018	7 / 953	1R	(Serbia) Dušan Lajović	93	Win	6–1, 6–0
Monte-Carlo Masters; Monte Carlo, Monaco; ATP 1000; Clay, outdoor 15 – 22 April 2018	8 / 954	2R	(Croatia) Borna Ćorić	39	Win	7–6^{(7–2)}, 7–5
Monte-Carlo Masters; Monte Carlo, Monaco; ATP 1000; Clay, outdoor 15 – 22 April 2018	9 / 955	3R	(Austria) Dominic Thiem (5)	7	Loss	7–6^{(7–2)}, 2–6, 3–6
Barcelona Open; Barcelona, Spain; ATP 500; Clay, outdoor 23 – 29 April 2018
Barcelona Open; Barcelona, Spain; ATP 500; Clay, outdoor 23 – 29 April 2018	–	1R	Bye			
Barcelona Open; Barcelona, Spain; ATP 500; Clay, outdoor 23 – 29 April 2018	10 / 956	2R	(Slovakia) Martin Kližan	140	Loss	2–6, 6–1, 3–6
Madrid Open; Madrid, Spain; ATP 1000; Clay, outdoor 7 – 13 May 2018
Madrid Open; Madrid, Spain; ATP 1000; Clay, outdoor 7 – 13 May 2018	11 / 957	1R	(Japan) Kei Nishikori	20	Win	7–5, 6–4
Madrid Open; Madrid, Spain; ATP 1000; Clay, outdoor 7 – 13 May 2018	12 / 958	2R	(United Kingdom) Kyle Edmund	22	Loss	3–6, 6–2, 3–6
Italian Open; Rome, Italy; ATP 1000; Clay, outdoor 14 – 20 May 2018
Italian Open; Rome, Italy; ATP 1000; Clay, outdoor 14 – 20 May 2018	13 / 959	1R	(Ukraine) Alexandr Dolgopolov	54	Win	6–1, 6–3
Italian Open; Rome, Italy; ATP 1000; Clay, outdoor 14 – 20 May 2018	14 / 960	2R	(Georgia (country)) Nikoloz Basilashvili	74	Win	6–4, 6–2
Italian Open; Rome, Italy; ATP 1000; Clay, outdoor 14 – 20 May 2018	15 / 961	3R	(Spain) Albert Ramos Viñolas	41	Win	6–1, 7–5
Italian Open; Rome, Italy; ATP 1000; Clay, outdoor 14 – 20 May 2018	16 / 962	QF	(Japan) Kei Nishikori	24	Win	2–6, 6–1, 6–3
Italian Open; Rome, Italy; ATP 1000; Clay, outdoor 14 – 20 May 2018	17 / 963	SF	(Spain) Rafael Nadal (1)	2	Loss	6–7^{(4–7)}, 3–6
French Open; Paris, France; Grand Slam tournament Clay, outdoor 28 May – 10 June 2018
French Open; Paris, France; Grand Slam tournament Clay, outdoor 28 May – 10 June 2018	18 / 964	1R	(Brazil) Rogério Dutra Silva	134	Win	6–3, 6–4, 6–4
French Open; Paris, France; Grand Slam tournament Clay, outdoor 28 May – 10 June 2018	19 / 965	2R	(Spain) Jaume Munar	155	Win	7–6^{(7–1)}, 6–4, 6–4
French Open; Paris, France; Grand Slam tournament Clay, outdoor 28 May – 10 June 2018	20 / 966	3R	(Spain) Roberto Bautista Agut (13)	13	Win	6–4, 6–7^{(6–8)}, 7–6^{(7–4)}, 6–2
French Open; Paris, France; Grand Slam tournament Clay, outdoor 28 May – 10 June 2018	21 / 967	4R	(Spain) Fernando Verdasco (30)	35	Win	6–3, 6–4, 6–2
French Open; Paris, France; Grand Slam tournament Clay, outdoor 28 May – 10 June 2018	22 / 968	QF	(Italy) Marco Cecchinato	72	Loss	3–6, 6–7^{(4–7)}, 6–1, 6–7^{(11–13)}
Queen's Club Championships; London, UK; ATP 500; Grass, outdoor 18 – 24 June 2018
Queen's Club Championships; London, UK; ATP 500; Grass, outdoor 18 – 24 June 2018	23 / 969	1R	(Australia) John Millman	63	Win	6–2, 6–1
Queen's Club Championships; London, UK; ATP 500; Grass, outdoor 18 – 24 June 2018	24 / 970	2R	(Bulgaria) Grigor Dimitrov (2)	5	Win	6–4, 6–1
Queen's Club Championships; London, UK; ATP 500; Grass, outdoor 18 – 24 June 2018	25 / 971	QF	(France) Adrian Mannarino	26	Win	7–5, 6–1
Queen's Club Championships; London, UK; ATP 500; Grass, outdoor 18 – 24 June 2018	26 / 972	SF	(France) Jérémy Chardy	61	Win	7–6^{(7–5)}, 6–4
Queen's Club Championships; London, UK; ATP 500; Grass, outdoor 18 – 24 June 2018	27 / 973	F	(Croatia) Marin Čilić (1)	6	Loss (1)	7–5, 6–7^{(4–7)}, 3–6
Wimbledon Championships; London, United Kingdom; Grand Slam tournament Grass, outdoor 2 – 15 July 2018
Wimbledon Championships; London, United Kingdom; Grand Slam tournament Grass, outdoor 2 – 15 July 2018	28 / 974	1R	(United States) Tennys Sandgren	57	Win	6–3, 6–1, 6–2
Wimbledon Championships; London, United Kingdom; Grand Slam tournament Grass, outdoor 2 – 15 July 2018	29 / 975	2R	(Argentina) Horacio Zeballos	126	Win	6–1, 6–2, 6–3
Wimbledon Championships; London, United Kingdom; Grand Slam tournament Grass, outdoor 2 – 15 July 2018	30 / 976	3R	(United Kingdom) Kyle Edmund (21)	17	Win	4–6, 6–3, 6–2, 6–4
Wimbledon Championships; London, United Kingdom; Grand Slam tournament Grass, outdoor 2 – 15 July 2018	31 / 977	4R	(Russia) Karen Khachanov	40	Win	6–4, 6–2, 6–2
Wimbledon Championships; London, United Kingdom; Grand Slam tournament Grass, outdoor 2 – 15 July 2018	32 / 978	QF	(Japan) Kei Nishikori (24)	28	Win	6–3, 3–6, 6–2, 6–2
Wimbledon Championships; London, United Kingdom; Grand Slam tournament Grass, outdoor 2 – 15 July 2018	33 / 979	SF	(Spain) Rafael Nadal (2)	1	Win	6–4, 3–6, 7–6^{(11–9)}, 3–6, 10–8
Wimbledon Championships; London, United Kingdom; Grand Slam tournament Grass, outdoor 2 – 15 July 2018	34 / 980	W	(South Africa) Kevin Anderson (8)	8	Win (1)	6–2, 6–2, 7–6^{(7–3)}
Canadian Open; Toronto, Canada; ATP 1000; Hard, outdoor 6 – 12 August 2018
Canadian Open; Toronto, Canada; ATP 1000; Hard, outdoor 6 – 12 August 2018	35 / 981	1R	(Bosnia and Herzegovina) Mirza Bašić (LL)	84	Win	6–3, 7–6^{(7–3)}
Canadian Open; Toronto, Canada; ATP 1000; Hard, outdoor 6 – 12 August 2018	36 / 982	2R	(Canada) Peter Polansky (WC)	121	Win	6–3, 6–4
Canadian Open; Toronto, Canada; ATP 1000; Hard, outdoor 6 – 12 August 2018	37 / 983	3R	(Greece) Stefanos Tsitsipas	27	Loss	3–6, 7–6^{(7–5)}, 3–6
Cincinnati Masters; Cincinnati, USA; ATP 1000; Hard, outdoor 13 – 19 August 2018
Cincinnati Masters; Cincinnati, USA; ATP 1000; Hard, outdoor 13 – 19 August 2018	38 / 984	1R	(United States) Steve Johnson	34	Win	6–4, 7–6^{(7–4)}
Cincinnati Masters; Cincinnati, USA; ATP 1000; Hard, outdoor 13 – 19 August 2018	39 / 985	2R	(France) Adrian Mannarino	25	Win	4–6, 6–2, 6–1
Cincinnati Masters; Cincinnati, USA; ATP 1000; Hard, outdoor 13 – 19 August 2018	40 / 986	3R	(Bulgaria) Grigor Dimitrov	5	Win	2–6, 6–3, 6–4
Cincinnati Masters; Cincinnati, USA; ATP 1000; Hard, outdoor 13 – 19 August 2018	41 / 987	QF	(Canada) Milos Raonic	29	Win	7–5, 4–6, 6–3
Cincinnati Masters; Cincinnati, USA; ATP 1000; Hard, outdoor 13 – 19 August 2018	42 / 988	SF	(Croatia) Marin Čilić (7)	7	Win	6–4, 3–6, 6–3
Cincinnati Masters; Cincinnati, USA; ATP 1000; Hard, outdoor 13 – 19 August 2018	43 / 989	W	(Switzerland) Roger Federer (2)	2	Win (2)	6–4, 6–4
US Open; New York City, United States; Grand Slam tournament Hard, outdoor 27 August – 9 September 2018
US Open; New York City, United States; Grand Slam tournament Hard, outdoor 27 August – 9 September 2018	44 / 990	1R	(Hungary) Márton Fucsovics	41	Win	6–3, 3–6, 6–4, 6–0
US Open; New York City, United States; Grand Slam tournament Hard, outdoor 27 August – 9 September 2018	45 / 991	2R	(United States) Tennys Sandgren	61	Win	6–1, 6–3, 6–7^{(2–7)}, 6–2
US Open; New York City, United States; Grand Slam tournament Hard, outdoor 27 August – 9 September 2018	46 / 992	3R	(France) Richard Gasquet (26)	25	Win	6–2, 6–3, 6–3
US Open; New York City, United States; Grand Slam tournament Hard, outdoor 27 August – 9 September 2018	47 / 993	4R	(Portugal) João Sousa	68	Win	6–3, 6–4, 6–3
US Open; New York City, United States; Grand Slam tournament Hard, outdoor 27 August – 9 September 2018	48 / 994	QF	(Australia) John Millman	55	Win	6–3, 6–4, 6–4
US Open; New York City, United States; Grand Slam tournament Hard, outdoor 27 August – 9 September 2018	49 / 995	SF	(Japan) Kei Nishikori (21)	19	Win	6–3, 6–4, 6–2
US Open; New York City, United States; Grand Slam tournament Hard, outdoor 27 August – 9 September 2018	50 / 996	W	(Argentina) Juan Martín del Potro (3)	3	Win (3)	6–3, 7–6^{(7–4)}, 6–3
Laver Cup; Chicago, United States; Laver Cup; Hard, indoor 21 – 23 September 2018
Laver Cup; Chicago, United States; Laver Cup; Hard, indoor 21 – 23 September 2018	51 / 997	Day 2	(South Africa) Kevin Anderson	9	Lost	6–7^{(5–7)}, 7–5, 6–10
Laver Cup; Chicago, United States; Laver Cup; Hard, indoor 21 – 23 September 2018	–	Day 3	(Australia) Nick Kyrgios	27	not played	N/A
Shanghai Masters; Shanghai, China; ATP 1000; Hard, outdoor 6 – 14 October 2018
Shanghai Masters; Shanghai, China; ATP 1000; Hard, outdoor 6 – 14 October 2018	–	1R	Bye			
Shanghai Masters; Shanghai, China; ATP 1000; Hard, outdoor 6 – 14 October 2018	52 / 998	2R	(France) Jérémy Chardy	41	Win	6–3, 7–5
Shanghai Masters; Shanghai, China; ATP 1000; Hard, outdoor 6 – 14 October 2018	53 / 999	3R	(Italy) Marco Cecchinato (16)	21	Win	6–4, 6–0
Shanghai Masters; Shanghai, China; ATP 1000; Hard, outdoor 6 – 14 October 2018	54 / 1000	QF	(South Africa) Kevin Anderson (7)	8	Win	7–6^{(7–1)}, 6–3
Shanghai Masters; Shanghai, China; ATP 1000; Hard, outdoor 6 – 14 October 2018	55 / 1001	SF	(Germany) Alexander Zverev (4)	5	Win	6–2, 6–1
Shanghai Masters; Shanghai, China; ATP 1000; Hard, outdoor 6 – 14 October 2018	56 / 1002	W	(Croatia) Borna Ćorić (13)	19	Win (4)	6–3, 6–4
Paris Masters; Paris, France; ATP 1000; Hard, indoor 29 October – 4 November 2018
Paris Masters; Paris, France; ATP 1000; Hard, indoor 29 October – 4 November 2018	–	1R	Bye			
Paris Masters; Paris, France; ATP 1000; Hard, indoor 29 October – 4 November 2018	57 / 1003	2R	(Portugal) João Sousa (Q)	48	Win	7–5, 6–1
Paris Masters; Paris, France; ATP 1000; Hard, indoor 29 October – 4 November 2018	58 / 1004	3R	(Bosnia and Herzegovina) Damir Džumhur	52	Win	6–1, 2–1 ret.
Paris Masters; Paris, France; ATP 1000; Hard, indoor 29 October – 4 November 2018	59 / 1005	QF	(Croatia) Marin Čilić (5)	7	Win	4–6, 6–2, 6–3
Paris Masters; Paris, France; ATP 1000; Hard, indoor 29 October – 4 November 2018	60 / 1006	SF	(Switzerland) Roger Federer (3)	3	Win	7–6^{(8–6)}, 5–7, 7–6^{(7–3)}
Paris Masters; Paris, France; ATP 1000; Hard, indoor 29 October – 4 November 2018	61 / 1007	F	(Russia) Karen Khachanov	18	Loss (2)	5–7, 4–6
ATP Finals; London, United Kingdom; ATP Finals; Hard, indoor 11 – 18 November 2018
ATP Finals; London, United Kingdom; ATP Finals; Hard, indoor 11 – 18 November 2018	62 / 1008	RR	(United States) John Isner (8)	10	Win	6–4, 6–3
ATP Finals; London, United Kingdom; ATP Finals; Hard, indoor 11 – 18 November 2018	63 / 1009	RR	(Germany) Alexander Zverev (3)	5	Win	6–4, 6–1
ATP Finals; London, United Kingdom; ATP Finals; Hard, indoor 11 – 18 November 2018	64 / 1010	RR	(Croatia) Marin Čilić (5)	7	Win	7–6^{(9–7)}, 6–2
ATP Finals; London, United Kingdom; ATP Finals; Hard, indoor 11 – 18 November 2018	65 / 1011	SF	(South Africa) Kevin Anderson (4)	6	Win	6–2, 6–2
ATP Finals; London, United Kingdom; ATP Finals; Hard, indoor 11 – 18 November 2018	66 / 1012	F	(Germany) Alexander Zverev (3)	5	Loss (3)	4–6, 3–6

=== Doubles matches ===
Tournament	Match	Round	Opponents (seed or key)	Ranks	Result	Score
Miami Open; Miami, United States; ATP 1000; Hard, outdoor 19 March – 1 April 2018; Partner: (Serbia) Viktor Troicki
Miami Open; Miami, United States; ATP 1000; Hard, outdoor 19 March – 1 April 2018; Partner: (Serbia) Viktor Troicki	1 / 106	1R	(Croatia) Mektić / (Austria) Peya	32 / 36	Loss	6–4, 5–7, [3–10]
Queen's Club Championships; London, UK; ATP 500; Grass, outdoor 18 – 24 June 2018; Partner: (Switzerland) Stan Wawrinka
Queen's Club Championships; London, UK; ATP 500; Grass, outdoor 18 – 24 June 2018; Partner: (Switzerland) Stan Wawrinka	2 / 107	1R	(New Zealand) Daniell / (Netherlands) Koolhof (LL)	40 / 46	Loss	4–6, 6–7^{(2–7)}
Canadian Open; Toronto, Canada; ATP 1000; Hard, outdoor 6 – 12 August 2018; Partner: (South Africa) Kevin Anderson
Canadian Open; Toronto, Canada; ATP 1000; Hard, outdoor 6 – 12 August 2018; Partner: (South Africa) Kevin Anderson	3 / 108	1R	(Canada) Auger-Aliassime / (Canada) Shapovalov (WC)	587 / 398	Win	6–3, 6–2
Canadian Open; Toronto, Canada; ATP 1000; Hard, outdoor 6 – 12 August 2018; Partner: (South Africa) Kevin Anderson	4 / 109	2R	(France) Herbert / (France) Mahut (3)	6 / 5	Win	4–6, 6–4, [10–7]
Canadian Open; Toronto, Canada; ATP 1000; Hard, outdoor 6 – 12 August 2018; Partner: (South Africa) Kevin Anderson	5 / 110	QF	(Croatia) Mektić / (Austria) Peya (4)	24 / 18	Loss	5–7, 5–7
Laver Cup; Chicago, United States; Laver Cup; Hard, indoor 21 – 23 September 2018; Partner: (Switzerland) Roger Federer
Laver Cup; Chicago, United States; Laver Cup; Hard, indoor 21 – 23 September 2018; Partner: (Switzerland) Roger Federer	6 / 111	Day 1	(South Africa) Kevin Anderson / (United States) Jack Sock	241 / 2	Loss	7–6^{(7–5)}, 3–6, [6–10]

=== Exhibition matches ===
Tournament	Match	Round	Opponent (seed or key)	Rank	Result	Score
2017 Mubadala World Tennis Championship; Abu Dhabi, United Arab Emirates Hard, outdoor 28 – 30 December 2017
2017 Mubadala World Tennis Championship; Abu Dhabi, United Arab Emirates Hard, outdoor 28 – 30 December 2017	–	QF	Bye			
2017 Mubadala World Tennis Championship; Abu Dhabi, United Arab Emirates Hard, outdoor 28 – 30 December 2017	–	SF	(Spain) Roberto Bautista Agut (5)	20	Withdrew	N/A
2017 Mubadala World Tennis Championship; Abu Dhabi, United Arab Emirates Hard, outdoor 28 – 30 December 2017	–	SF-B	(Austria) Dominic Thiem (1)	5	Withdrew	N/A
Tie Break Tens; Melbourne, Australia Hard, indoor 10 January 2018
Tie Break Tens; Melbourne, Australia Hard, indoor 10 January 2018	1	QF	(Australia) Lleyton Hewitt	–	Loss	[6–10]
Radek Štěpánek's farewell match Prague, Czech Republic Hard, indoor 18 October 2018
Radek Štěpánek's farewell match Prague, Czech Republic Hard, indoor 18 October 2018	2		(Czech Republic) Radek Štěpánek	–	Loss	6–7^{(6–8)}

=== Singles schedule ===
Date	Tournament	Location	Category	Surface	Prev. result	Prev. points	New points	Result
15 January 2018– 28 January 2018	Australian Open	Melbourne (AUS)	Grand Slam	Hard	2R	45	180	Fourth round (lost to Chung Hyeon, 6–7^{(4–7)}, 5–7, 6–7^{(3–7)})
5 March 2018– 18 March 2018	Indian Wells Masters	Indian Wells (USA)	Masters 1000	Hard	4R	90	10	Second round (lost to Taro Daniel, 6–7^{(3–7)}, 6–4, 1–6
19 March 2018– 1 April 2018	Miami Open	Miami (USA)	Masters 1000	Hard	A	N/A	10	Second round (lost to Benoît Paire, 3–6, 4–6)
15 April 2018– 22 April 2018	Monte-Carlo Masters	Monte-Carlo (MON)	Masters 1000	Clay	QF	180	90	Third round (lost to Dominic Thiem, 7–6^{(7–2)}, 2–6, 3–6)
23 April 2018– 29 April 2018	Barcelona Open	Barcelona (ESP)	500 Series	Clay	A	N/A	0	Second round (lost to Martin Kližan, 2–6, 6–1, 3–6)
7 May 2018– 13 May 2018	Madrid Open	Madrid (ESP)	Masters 1000	Clay	SF	360	45	Second round (lost to Kyle Edmund, 3–6, 6–2, 3–6)
14 May 2018– 20 May 2018	Italian Open	Rome (ITA)	Masters 1000	Clay	F	600	360	Semifinals (lost to Rafael Nadal, 6–7^{(4–7)}, 3–6)
28 May 2018– 10 June 2018	French Open	Paris (FRA)	Grand Slam	Clay	QF	360	360	Quarterfinals (lost to Marco Cecchinato, 3–6, 6–7^{(4–7)}, 6–1, 6–7^{(11–13)})
18 June 2018– 24 June 2018	Queen's Club	London (GBR)	500 Series	Grass	A	N/A	300	Final (lost to Marin Čilić, 7–5, 6–7^{(4–7)}, 3–6)
2 July 2018– 15 July 2018	Wimbledon	London (GBR)	Grand Slam	Grass	QF	360	2000	Champion (defeated Kevin Anderson, 6–2, 6–2, 7–6^{(7–3)})
6 August 2018– 12 August 2018	Canadian Open	Toronto (CAN)	Masters 1000	Hard	A	N/A	90	Third round (lost to Stefanos Tsitsipas, 3–6, 7–6^{(7–5)}, 3–6)
13 August 2018– 19 August 2018	Cincinnati Masters	Cincinnati (USA)	Masters 1000	Hard	A	N/A	1000	Champion (defeated Roger Federer, 6–4, 6–4)
27 August 2018– 9 September 2018	US Open	New York (USA)	Grand Slam	Hard	A	N/A	2000	Champion (defeated Juan Martín del Potro, 6–3, 7–6^{(7–4)}, 6–3)
8 October 2018– 14 October 2018	Shanghai Masters	Shanghai (CHN)	Masters 1000	Hard	A	N/A	1000	Champion (defeated Borna Ćorić, 6–3, 6–4)
29 October 2018– 4 November 2018	Paris Masters	Paris (FRA)	Masters 1000	Hard (i)	A	N/A	600	Final (lost to Karen Khachanov, 5–7, 4–6)
11 November 2018– 18 November 2018	ATP Finals	London (GBR)	ATP Finals	Hard (i)	DNQ	N/A	1000	Final (lost to Alexander Zverev, 4–6, 3–6)
Total year-end points						2585	9045	▲6460 difference

== Yearly records ==
=== Head-to-head matchups ===
Novak Djokovic has a 53–13 ATP match win–loss record in the 2018 season. His record against players who were part of the ATP rankings Top Ten at the time of their meetings is 15–5. Bold indicates player was ranked top 10 at the time of at least one meeting. The following list is ordered by number of wins:

- (Japan) Kei Nishikori 4–0
- **(South Africa) Kevin Anderson** 3–1
- **(Croatia) Marin Čilić** 3–1
- **(Switzerland) Roger Federer** 2–0
- **(Bulgaria) Grigor Dimitrov** 2–0
- (Spain) Albert Ramos Viñolas 2–0
- (France) Adrian Mannarino 2–0
- (United States) Tennys Sandgren 2–0
- (Australia) John Millman 2–0
- (France) Jérémy Chardy 2–0
- (Croatia) Borna Ćorić 2–0
- (Portugal) João Sousa 2–0
- **(Germany) Alexander Zverev** 2–1
- **(Spain) Rafael Nadal** 1–1
- (United Kingdom) Kyle Edmund 1–1
- (Russia) Karen Khachanov 1–1
- (Italy) Marco Cecchinato 1–1
- **(Argentina) Juan Martín del Potro** 1–0
- **(United States) John Isner** 1–0
- (United States) Donald Young 1–0
- (France) Gaël Monfils 1–0
- (Serbia) Dušan Lajović 1–0
- (Ukraine) Alexandr Dolgopolov 1–0
- (Georgia (country)) Nikoloz Basilashvili 1–0
- (Brazil) Rogério Dutra Silva 1–0
- (Spain) Jaume Munar 1–0
- (Spain) Roberto Bautista Agut 1–0
- (Spain) Fernando Verdasco 1–0
- (Argentina) Horacio Zeballos 1–0
- (Bosnia and Herzegovina) Mirza Bašić 1–0
- (Canada) Peter Polansky 1–0
- (United States) Steve Johnson 1–0
- (Canada) Milos Raonic 1–0
- (Hungary) Márton Fucsovics 1–0
- (France) Richard Gasquet 1–0
- (Bosnia and Herzegovina) Damir Džumhur 1–0
- **(Austria) Dominic Thiem** 0–1
- (South Korea) Chung Hyeon 0–1
- (Japan) Taro Daniel 0–1
- (France) Benoît Paire 0–1
- (Slovakia) Martin Kližan 0–1
- (Greece) Stefanos Tsitsipas 0–1

* Statistics correct as of 18 November 2018.

=== Finals ===
==== Singles: 7 (4 titles, 3 runner-ups) ====
Category Grand Slam (2–0) ATP Finals (0–1) ATP World Tour Masters 1000 (2–1) ATP World Tour 500 (0–1) ATP World Tour 250 (0–0)	Titles by surface Hard (3–1) Clay (0–0) Grass (1–1)	Titles by setting Outdoor (4–1) Indoor (0–2)

Result	W–L	Date	Tournament	Tier	Surface	Opponent	Score
Loss	0–1	Jun 2018	Queen's Club Championships, United Kingdom	500 Series	Grass	(Croatia) Marin Čilić	7–5, 6–7^{(4–7)}, 3–6
Win	1–1	Jul 2018	Wimbledon, United Kingdom (4)	Grand Slam	Grass	(South Africa) Kevin Anderson	6–2, 6–2, 7–6^{(7–3)}
Win	2–1	Aug 2018	Cincinnati Masters, United States	Masters 1000	Hard	(Switzerland) Roger Federer	6–4, 6–4
Win	3–1	Sept 2018	US Open, United States (3)	Grand Slam	Hard	(Argentina) Juan Martín del Potro	6–3, 7–6^{(7–4)}, 6–3
Win	4–1	Oct 2018	Shanghai Masters, China (4)	Masters 1000	Hard	(Croatia) Borna Ćorić	6–3, 6–4
Loss	4–2	Nov 2018	Paris Masters, France	Masters 1000	Hard (i)	(Russia) Karen Khachanov	5–7, 4–6
Loss	4–3	Nov 2018	ATP Finals, United Kingdom	Tour Finals	Hard (i)	(Germany) Alexander Zverev	3–6, 3–6

=== Earnings ===
- **Bold** font denotes tournament win

Event	Prize money	Year-to-date
Australian Open	A$240,000	$189,888
Indian Wells Masters	$25,465	$215,353
Miami Open	$25,465	$240,818
Monte-Carlo Masters	€60,945	$315,950
Barcelona Open	€17,240	$337,128
Madrid Open	€40,900	$386,040
Italian Open	€230,830	$661,628
French Open	€380,000	$1,104,328
Queen's Club	€209,630	$1,347,583
**Wimbledon**	**£2,250,000**	**$4,318,033**
Rogers Cup	$66,490	$4,384,524
**Cincinnati Masters**	**$1,088,450**	**$5,472,974**
**US Open**	**$3,800,000**	**$9,272,974**
**Shanghai Masters**	**$1,360,560**	**$10,633,534**
Paris Masters	€477,315	$11,177,673
ATP Finals	$1,432,000	$12,609,673
Bonus Pool	$3,325,000	$15,934,672
Doubles	$32,512	$32,512
**Total**		**$15,967,184**

Figures in United States dollars (USD) unless noted.

- source：

== See also ==
- 2018 ATP World Tour
- 2018 Roger Federer tennis season
- 2018 Rafael Nadal tennis season
- 2018 Juan Martín del Potro tennis season
