= 2018 Rafael Nadal tennis season =

Statistics for Spanish tennis player

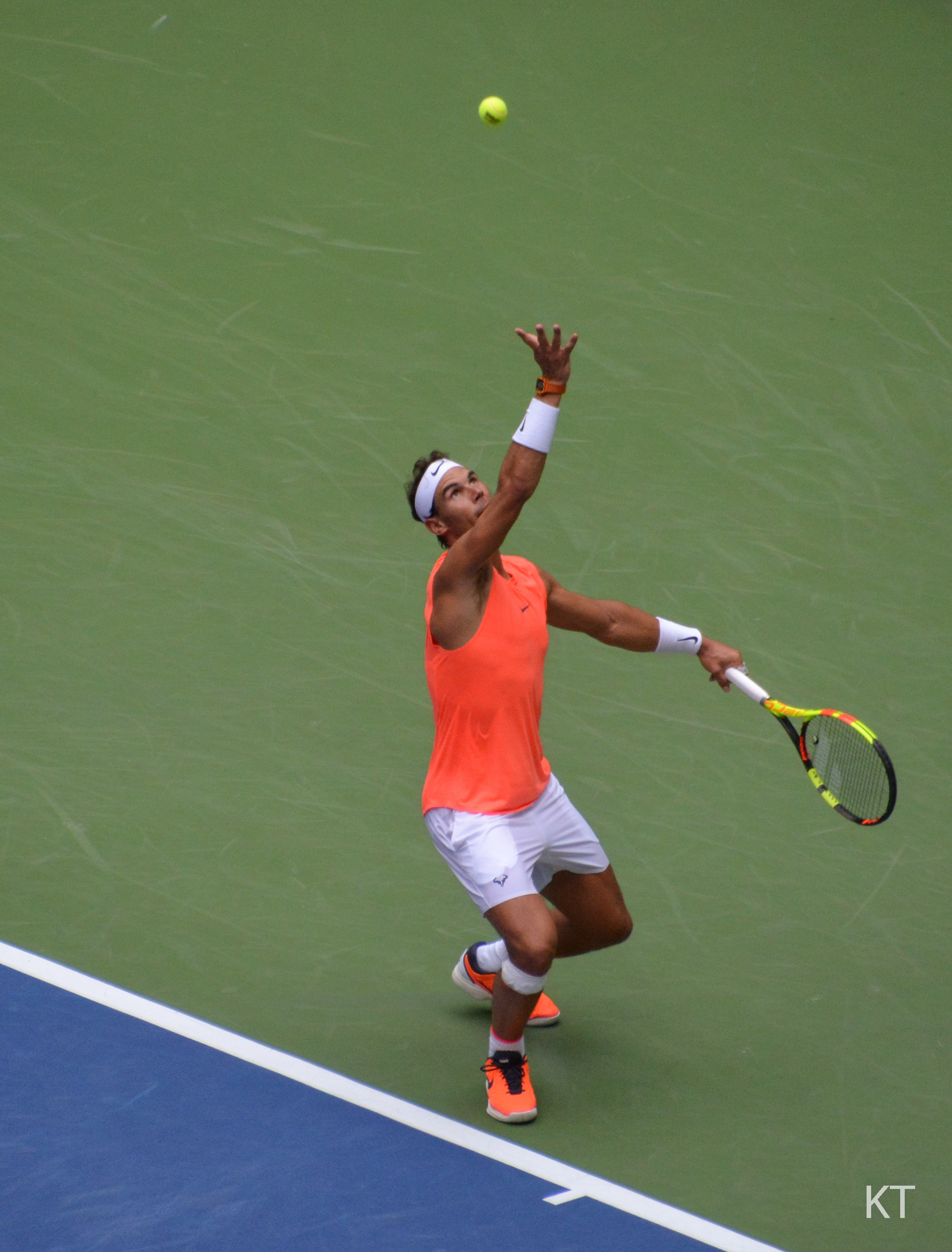
- Full name: Rafael Nadal Parera
- Country: Spain
- Calendar prize money: $8,663,347

Singles
- Season record: 45–4
- Calendar titles: 5
- Current ranking: No. 2
- Ranking change from previous year: ▼1

Grand Slam & significant results
- Australian Open: QF
- French Open: W
- Wimbledon: SF
- US Open: SF
- Other tournaments
- Tour Finals: A

Doubles
- Season record: 0–0
- Current ranking: Unranked

Mixed doubles
- Season record: 0–0

Davis Cup
- Davis Cup: SF

Injuries
- Injuries: Hip injury (January – March); Knee injury (September – October); Abdominal/ankle injury (season ending)
- Last updated on: 5 November 2018.

The 2018 Rafael Nadal tennis season officially began on 15 January 2018, with the start of the Australian Open, and ended on 8 September 2018, with a loss at the semifinals of the US Open and subsequent injury.

The season was largely shortened by the hip, knee, abdominal and ankle injuries Nadal suffered during the year. He played only nine tournaments, his lowest since 2002 (which was his first year on the ATP tour). However, the season still saw Nadal win five titles (5–0 in finals) including a record extending 11th title at the French Open, and have his highest winning percentage of a single season at 91.83%. By the time he ended his season after 49 matches, he also led the ATP Tour in return statistics, second-serve points won, titles won, and match-winning percentage.

== Year summary ==
=== Early hard court season ===
==== Exhibition matches ====
As of in his 2017 season, Nadal's schedule before the Australian Open included the World Tennis Championship, in Abu Dhabi, the Brisbane International and the Fast4 Showdown, in Sydney. However, he pulled out of all three events due to a knee injury. His season started in Melbourne with a match against Richard Gasquet, included in the Kooyong Classic exhibition tournament, which he lost in straight sets. On the day after, Nadal moved on to play the Tie Break Tens, another exhibition tournament where only tie-break matches are played. He defeated Lucas Pouille in the quarterfinals and Lleyton Hewitt in the semifinals, before losing in the final against Tomáš Berdych. Nadal closed his Australian Open preparation with another exhibition match against Dominic Thiem in the Margaret Court Arena, which he won in a third-set match tiebreaker.

==== Australian Open ====
In the first major tournament of the year, the Australian Open, Nadal was the top seed, knowing that he would need to reach the quarterfinals in order to secure the No. 1 position in the ATP rankings. Despite playing his first official match in more than two months, Nadal easily defeated Víctor Estrella Burgos in straight sets. Following strong performances in straight sets victories against Leonardo Mayer and Damir Džumhur, he defeated Diego Schwartzman in the fourth round, reaching the quarterfinals and thus retaining the world No. 1 status. In the quarterfinals he faced World No. 6 Marin Čilić, and despite leading two sets to one, he eventually had to retire after going down a break in the fifth set due to a hip injury.

==== Mexican Open ====
Having been relegated to No. 2 in the ATP rankings a week before, Nadal was set to play at the Mexican Open. However, he was forced to again pull out of the tournament due to the hip injury sustained at the Australian Open that was aggravated in a practice session. On 2 March 2018, through his Facebook account, Nadal announced the withdrawal from the season's first two Masters 1000 tournaments: the Indian Wells Masters and the Miami Open. Despite his absence, Nadal regained the world No. 1 position on 2 April 2018, due to Roger Federer losing in the second round of the Miami Open.

=== Spring clay court season ===
==== Davis Cup World Group quarterfinals ====
As announced on 27 March 2018 by the Spain Davis Cup team captain Sergi Bruguera, Nadal represented his country participating in the Davis Cup World Group quarterfinal tie against Germany, in Valencia. These were Nadal's first matches since his Australian Open defeat, more than two months later. Nadal won both his singles rubbers, against Philipp Kohlschreiber and Alexander Zverev, in straight sets, to help Spain advancing to the semifinals.

==== Monte-Carlo Masters ====
At the Monte-Carlo Masters, Nadal successfully defended his title by winning an unprecedented 11th title in Monte-Carlo, reaching the finals without dropping a set and not losing more than 4 games in each set that he played against Aljaž Bedene, Karen Khachanov, Dominic Thiem and Grigor Dimitrov. In the final, he halted former top 4 player Kei Nishikori's resurgence by beating him in straight sets, extending his clay winning streak to 36 sets in a row. Additionally, none of his opponents were able to win more than 4 games in each of those 36 sets. This tournament victory marked the Spaniard's 31st Masters 1000 title, putting him yet again at the top of most Masters 1000 titles won, passing rival Novak Djokovic who stands at 30. His 36 straight sets won on clay also became a record, surpassing both Ilie Nastase and Guillermo Coria, who won 34 and 35 straight sets respectively and are the only players to win 30 or more consecutive sets on clay other than Nadal. In that process, he also retained his World No. 1 ranking for another week.

==== Barcelona Open ====
Coming to Barcelona, Nadal again required to defend his title at the Barcelona Open if he were to retain his no.1 ranking, which he did in pure dominance. He extended his record of straight sets won on clay to 46 consecutive sets, with Martin Klizan, Nadal's quarterfinal opponent becoming the first man to take more than 4 games off in a single set against Nadal since Dominic Thiem beat him at last year's Rome Masters. Nadal's semifinal win against David Goffin was his 400th match won on clay, making him the only player, of either gender, to win at least 400 matches in both clay and hard courts. In the final, he defeated Greek rising star Stefanos Tsitsipas in straight sets with the loss of only 3 games, despite the Greek having not lost a single set in the tournament. This victory was his 11th Barcelona Open title and his 77th overall. The win marked his 20th ATP 500 series title, which put him back atop the list of most ATP 500 titles, tied with Roger Federer. Additionally, it marked his 14th consecutive season in which he won at least 1 ATP 500 title.

==== Madrid Open ====
Fresh after achieving the 'Undecima' of Monte Carlo and Barcelona titles, Nadal had to defend yet another title at Madrid if he were to retain his No. 1 ranking, with the tournament taking place on his home soil. He reached the quarterfinals, defeating Gael Monfils and Diego Schwartzman in straight sets, to extend his record to 50 consecutive sets on clay starting from 2017 French Open. His win over Schwartzman broke John McEnroe's record of 49 straight sets won on a single surface. McEnroe had previously achieved the record on carpet in 1984. In a surprise, Nadal lost in straight sets to Dominic Thiem in quarterfinals, ending his 21-match and record 50-set winning streak on clay. He also relinquished his world no. 1 ranking to Federer in the process.

==== Italian Open ====
Nadal next participated at the Italian Open with a chance to regain his No.1 ranking if he were to win the tournament, which he did convincingly. He started off fresh and dominant, dispatching both Damir Džumhur and Canadian #NextGen Denis Shapovalov in just the loss of 6 games. He reached the semifinals by mounting a comeback against home-favourite Fabio Fognini after losing the first set. In the semifinals, he faced his resurging arch-rival Novak Djokovic for the 51st time, beating him in two sets after a tight first set tiebreak. This victory was his 356th match win in Masters 1000 level, thus surpassing Roger Federer for most matches won in the category. He faced in form German Alexander Zverev in the finals who was riding on a 13-match winning streak after reaching his 3rd tournament final in as many weeks, winning the previous two. After easily winning the first set, Zverev won the second set and was up a break in the third set before a rain delay interrupted the match. However, after the delay, Nadal would go on to win 5 straight games to seal the victory. This was his 8th Italian Open title and overall record-extending 32nd Masters 1000 title. It is also his 78th career title, making him the 4th most title holder in the Open Era, passing John McEnroe whom he was tied with before this tournament. He became world no. 1 again after relinquishing it for only one week.

==== French Open ====
Nadal needed to win the French Open to retain his World No. 1 ranking. He began the tournament by defeating Simone Bolelli, Guido Pella, Richard Gasquet, and Maximilian Marterer all without losing a set en route to the quarterfinals. His opponent in the QF, clay-court specialist Diego Schwartzman, took the first set and became the first person to win a set against Nadal in the tournament since Djokovic defeated Nadal in straight sets in the 2015 French Open, thus ending Nadal's 37 sets win streak at the French Open. Nadal won the next three sets and continued his form by defeating Juan Martín del Potro in the semifinals in straight sets. In the final, he met Dominic Thiem, the only man to beat Nadal on clay in 2017 and 2018. Nadal dispatched the Austrian in three sets, never losing more than 4 games in a set, to win his record-extending 11th French Open title, equalling the record for most titles won in a single major by either men or women held by Margaret Court with her 11 titles in the Australian Open. His win was also his 17th major singles title, which is 2nd on the men's Open Era list behind only Roger Federer.

=== Grass court season ===
==== Exhibition matches ====
Nadal's schedule for 2018 included the Queen's Club Championships, but in the week before he chose to withdraw from the tournament to be able to recover after the clay court season. He chose to participate in the Hurlingham Tennis Classic, an exhibition tournament played from 26 to 29 June at the Hurlingham Club, in London, to get some preparation for the following week's Wimbledon Championships. He first played Matthew Ebden, winning the match in two tight sets, and on the tournament's last day he played Lucas Pouille – this time losing in straight sets.

==== Wimbledon ====
Despite being ranked ATP No. 1 coming to Wimbledon, Nadal was seeded 2nd according to their special formula (behind defending champion Roger Federer). He successfully replicated his previous result of reaching the 4th round by defeating Dudi Sela, Mikhail Kukushkin, and rising-star Alex de Minaur all in straight sets, guaranteeing himself the No. 1 ranking after Wimbledon. Nadal booked his first quarterfinal spot since reaching the Wimbledon final in 2011 by beating Jiří Veselý in straight sets. He proceeded towards the semis after outlasting Juan Martín del Potro in a five-set thriller which lasted nearly 5 hours. In the semifinals, he suffered a heart-breaking five set loss to Djokovic after squandering three set points in the third set, that would have put him at a 2-1 set lead after that set, with the match lasting two days due to Wimbledon's 11pm curfew. However, a semifinal at Wimbledon indicated his best performances here since 2011. This semifinal match was the second longest ever, the longest was Kevin Anderson vs John Isner which the two had played before the Nadal-Djokovic match earlier on that day.

=== North American hard court season ===
==== Canadian Open ====
Nadal opened his hard court season campaign by beating Benoît Paire in straight sets. In the round of 16, he beat resurging former World No. 3 Stan Wawrinka in straight sets, and followed this with a comeback victory against World No. 7 Marin Cilic, whom he lost to after retiring in the Australian Open, in the quarterfinals. He remained solid and defeated in-form NextGen player Karen Khachanov in straight sets to reach his first hard court final of the year. Nadal faced off against Stefanos Tsitsipas in the final and won in straight sets, winning his 4th Rogers Cup title and extending his record Masters 1000 titles to 33 titles. It was his first victory at a hard court Masters 1000 tournament since 2013 Western & Southern Open. He also became the 4th male player to win 80 career singles titles.

==== US Open ====
Having not played since his victory in Canada due to withdrawing from Cincinnati, Nadal was seeded No.1 at the US Open, where he was the defending champion. In the first round, Nadal faced compatriot David Ferrer, who was playing in his last grand tournament. In the last grand slam match of his career, Ferrer retired with a foot injury in second set. In the second round, Nadal faced Canadian Vasek Pospisil, who he defeated easily in straight sets. In the third round, Nadal faced Russian Karen Khachanov, who pushed Nadal hard before he managed to win in four tight sets. His next opponent was Georgian Nikoloz Basilashvili, whom he defeated in four sets. This marked the first year since 2011 that Nadal had reached the QF of all four majors. In his quarterfinal match, Nadal faced World No. 9 Dominic Thiem, whom he defeated earlier in the year in the French Open final. In an epic match, Nadal managed to seal the victory in the fifth set tiebreak, after having lost the first set 0-6. Nadal went on to then face Juan Martin del Potro, in a rematch of the previous year's semifinal which Nadal had won in four sets. However, Nadal retired after going down two sets to love due to a right knee injury. On 19 September, Nadal withdrew from the Asian tournaments at Beijing and Shanghai to fully recover from the injury.

=== European indoor hard court season ===
==== Paris Masters ====
Nadal was scheduled to return from knee injury hiatus in the Paris Masters, but withdrew from an abdominal injury suffered during a training session. In that process, he also lost his world No. 1 ranking to Novak Djokovic.

==== ATP Tour Finals ====
On November 5, Nadal announced his withdrawal from the ATP Finals due to the abdominal injury, and also citing an ankle injury on which he decided to undergo surgery. This marked the end of his 2018 season, having not played since retiring in the semifinals of the US Open.

== All matches ==
This table chronicles all the matches of Rafael Nadal in 2018, including walkovers (W/O) which the ATP does not count as wins.

Key
| W | F | SF | QF | #R | RR | Q# | P# | DNQ | A | Z# | PO | G | S | B | NMS | NTI | P | NH |

(W) winner; (F) finalist; (SF) semifinalist; (QF) quarterfinalist; (#R) rounds 4, 3, 2, 1; (RR) round-robin stage; (Q#) qualification round; (P#) preliminary round; (DNQ) did not qualify; (A) absent; (Z#) Davis/Fed Cup Zonal Group (with number indication) or (PO) play-off; (G) gold, (S) silver or (B) bronze Olympic/Paralympic medal; (NMS) not a Masters tournament; (NTI) not a Tier I tournament; (P) postponed; (NH) not held; (SR) strike rate (events won / competed); (W–L) win–loss record.
To avoid confusion and double counting, these charts are updated at the conclusion of a tournament or when the player's participation has ended.

=== Singles matches ===
| Tournament | Match | Round | Opponent (seed or key) | Rank | Result | Score |
|---|---|---|---|---|---|---|
Australian Open; Melbourne, Australia; Grand Slam tournament Hard, outdoor 15 – 28 January 2018
| Australian Open; Melbourne, Australia; Grand Slam tournament Hard, outdoor 15 – 28 January 2018 | 1 / 1061 | 1R | (Dominican Republic) Víctor Estrella Burgos | 79 | Win | 6–1, 6–1, 6–1 |
| Australian Open; Melbourne, Australia; Grand Slam tournament Hard, outdoor 15 – 28 January 2018 | 2 / 1062 | 2R | (Argentina) Leonardo Mayer | 52 | Win | 6–3, 6–4, 7–6^{(7–4)} |
| Australian Open; Melbourne, Australia; Grand Slam tournament Hard, outdoor 15 – 28 January 2018 | 3 / 1063 | 3R | (Bosnia and Herzegovina) Damir Džumhur (28) | 30 | Win | 6–1, 6–3, 6–1 |
| Australian Open; Melbourne, Australia; Grand Slam tournament Hard, outdoor 15 – 28 January 2018 | 4 / 1064 | 4R | (Argentina) Diego Schwartzman (24) | 26 | Win | 6–3, 6–7^{(4–7)}, 6–3, 6–3 |
| Australian Open; Melbourne, Australia; Grand Slam tournament Hard, outdoor 15 – 28 January 2018 | 5 / 1065 | QF | (Croatia) Marin Čilić (6) | 6 | Loss | 6–3, 3–6, 7–6^{(7–5)}, 2–6, 0–2 ret. |
Mexican Open; Acapulco, Mexico; ATP 500; Hard, outdoor 26 February – 3 March 2018
| Mexican Open; Acapulco, Mexico; ATP 500; Hard, outdoor 26 February – 3 March 2018 | Withdrew | | | | | |
Davis Cup World Group QF; Valencia, Spain; Davis Cup; Clay, outdoor 6 – 8 April 2018
| Davis Cup World Group QF; Valencia, Spain; Davis Cup; Clay, outdoor 6 – 8 April 2018 | 6 / 1066 | QF | (Germany) Philipp Kohlschreiber | 34 | Win | 6–2, 6–2, 6–3 |
| Davis Cup World Group QF; Valencia, Spain; Davis Cup; Clay, outdoor 6 – 8 April 2018 | 7 / 1067 | QF | (Germany) Alexander Zverev | 4 | Win | 6–1, 6–4, 6–4 |
Monte-Carlo Masters; Roquebrune-Cap-Martin, France; ATP 1000; Clay, outdoor 15 – 22 April 2018
| Monte-Carlo Masters; Roquebrune-Cap-Martin, France; ATP 1000; Clay, outdoor 15 – 22 April 2018 | – | 1R | Bye | | | |
| Monte-Carlo Masters; Roquebrune-Cap-Martin, France; ATP 1000; Clay, outdoor 15 – 22 April 2018 | 8 / 1068 | 2R | (Slovenia) Aljaž Bedene | 58 | Win | 6–1, 6–3 |
| Monte-Carlo Masters; Roquebrune-Cap-Martin, France; ATP 1000; Clay, outdoor 15 – 22 April 2018 | 9 / 1069 | 3R | (Russia) Karen Khachanov | 38 | Win | 6–3, 6–2 |
| Monte-Carlo Masters; Roquebrune-Cap-Martin, France; ATP 1000; Clay, outdoor 15 – 22 April 2018 | 10 / 1070 | QF | (Austria) Dominic Thiem (5) | 7 | Win | 6–0, 6–2 |
| Monte-Carlo Masters; Roquebrune-Cap-Martin, France; ATP 1000; Clay, outdoor 15 – 22 April 2018 | 11 / 1071 | SF | (Bulgaria) Grigor Dimitrov (4) | 5 | Win | 6–4, 6–1 |
| Monte-Carlo Masters; Roquebrune-Cap-Martin, France; ATP 1000; Clay, outdoor 15 – 22 April 2018 | 12 / 1072 | W | (Japan) Kei Nishikori | 36 | Win (1) | 6–3, 6–2 |
Barcelona Open; Barcelona, Spain; ATP 500; Clay, outdoor 23 – 29 April 2018
| Barcelona Open; Barcelona, Spain; ATP 500; Clay, outdoor 23 – 29 April 2018 | – | 1R | Bye | | | |
| Barcelona Open; Barcelona, Spain; ATP 500; Clay, outdoor 23 – 29 April 2018 | 13 / 1073 | 2R | (Spain) Roberto Carballés Baena | 77 | Win | 6–4, 6–4 |
| Barcelona Open; Barcelona, Spain; ATP 500; Clay, outdoor 23 – 29 April 2018 | 14 / 1074 | 3R | (Spain) Guillermo García López | 69 | Win | 6–1, 6–3 |
| Barcelona Open; Barcelona, Spain; ATP 500; Clay, outdoor 23 – 29 April 2018 | 15 / 1075 | QF | (Slovakia) Martin Kližan (Q) | 140 | Win | 6–0, 7–5 |
| Barcelona Open; Barcelona, Spain; ATP 500; Clay, outdoor 23 – 29 April 2018 | 16 / 1076 | SF | (Belgium) David Goffin (4) | 10 | Win | 6–4, 6–0 |
| Barcelona Open; Barcelona, Spain; ATP 500; Clay, outdoor 23 – 29 April 2018 | 17 / 1077 | W | (Greece) Stefanos Tsitsipas | 63 | Win (2) | 6–2, 6–1 |
Madrid Open; Madrid, Spain; ATP 1000; Clay, outdoor 7 – 13 May 2018
| Madrid Open; Madrid, Spain; ATP 1000; Clay, outdoor 7 – 13 May 2018 | – | 1R | Bye | | | |
| Madrid Open; Madrid, Spain; ATP 1000; Clay, outdoor 7 – 13 May 2018 | 18 / 1078 | 2R | (France) Gaël Monfils | 41 | Win | 6–3, 6–1 |
| Madrid Open; Madrid, Spain; ATP 1000; Clay, outdoor 7 – 13 May 2018 | 19 / 1079 | 3R | (Argentina) Diego Schwartzman (13) | 16 | Win | 6–3, 6–4 |
| Madrid Open; Madrid, Spain; ATP 1000; Clay, outdoor 7 – 13 May 2018 | 20 / 1080 | QF | (Austria) Dominic Thiem (5) | 7 | Loss | 5–7, 3–6 |
Italian Open; Rome, Italy; ATP 1000; Clay, outdoor 14 – 20 May 2018
| Italian Open; Rome, Italy; ATP 1000; Clay, outdoor 14 – 20 May 2018 | – | 1R | Bye | | | |
| Italian Open; Rome, Italy; ATP 1000; Clay, outdoor 14 – 20 May 2018 | 21 / 1081 | 2R | (Bosnia and Herzegovina) Damir Džumhur | 31 | Win | 6–1, 6–0 |
| Italian Open; Rome, Italy; ATP 1000; Clay, outdoor 14 – 20 May 2018 | 22 / 1082 | 3R | (Canada) Denis Shapovalov | 29 | Win | 6–4, 6–1 |
| Italian Open; Rome, Italy; ATP 1000; Clay, outdoor 14 – 20 May 2018 | 23 / 1083 | QF | (Italy) Fabio Fognini | 21 | Win | 4–6, 6–1, 6–2 |
| Italian Open; Rome, Italy; ATP 1000; Clay, outdoor 14 – 20 May 2018 | 24 / 1084 | SF | (Serbia) Novak Djokovic (11) | 18 | Win | 7–6^{(7–4)}, 6–3 |
| Italian Open; Rome, Italy; ATP 1000; Clay, outdoor 14 – 20 May 2018 | 25 / 1085 | W | (Germany) Alexander Zverev (2) | 3 | Win (3) | 6–1, 1–6, 6–3 |
French Open; Paris, France; Grand Slam tournament Clay, outdoor 28 May – 10 June 2018
| French Open; Paris, France; Grand Slam tournament Clay, outdoor 28 May – 10 June 2018 | 26 / 1086 | 1R | (Italy) Simone Bolelli (LL) | 130 | Win | 6–4, 6–3, 7–6^{(11–9)} |
| French Open; Paris, France; Grand Slam tournament Clay, outdoor 28 May – 10 June 2018 | 27 / 1087 | 2R | (Argentina) Guido Pella | 78 | Win | 6–2, 6–1, 6–1 |
| French Open; Paris, France; Grand Slam tournament Clay, outdoor 28 May – 10 June 2018 | 28 / 1088 | 3R | (France) Richard Gasquet (27) | 32 | Win | 6–3, 6–2, 6–2 |
| French Open; Paris, France; Grand Slam tournament Clay, outdoor 28 May – 10 June 2018 | 29 / 1089 | 4R | (Germany) Maximilian Marterer | 70 | Win | 6–3, 6–2, 7–6^{(7–4)} |
| French Open; Paris, France; Grand Slam tournament Clay, outdoor 28 May – 10 June 2018 | 30 / 1090 | QF | (Argentina) Diego Schwartzman (11) | 12 | Win | 4–6, 6–3, 6–2, 6–2 |
| French Open; Paris, France; Grand Slam tournament Clay, outdoor 28 May – 10 June 2018 | 31 / 1091 | SF | (Argentina) Juan Martín del Potro (5) | 6 | Win | 6–4, 6–1, 6–2 |
| French Open; Paris, France; Grand Slam tournament Clay, outdoor 28 May – 10 June 2018 | 32 / 1092 | W | (Austria) Dominic Thiem (7) | 8 | Win (4) | 6–4, 6–3, 6–2 |
Wimbledon Championships; London, United Kingdom; Grand Slam tournament Grass, outdoor 2 – 15 July 2018
| Wimbledon Championships; London, United Kingdom; Grand Slam tournament Grass, outdoor 2 – 15 July 2018 | 33 / 1093 | 1R | (Israel) Dudi Sela | 129 | Win | 6–3, 6–3, 6–2 |
| Wimbledon Championships; London, United Kingdom; Grand Slam tournament Grass, outdoor 2 – 15 July 2018 | 34 / 1094 | 2R | (Kazakhstan) Mikhail Kukushkin | 77 | Win | 6–4, 6–3, 6–4 |
| Wimbledon Championships; London, United Kingdom; Grand Slam tournament Grass, outdoor 2 – 15 July 2018 | 35 / 1095 | 3R | (Australia) Alex de Minaur | 80 | Win | 6–1, 6–2, 6–4 |
| Wimbledon Championships; London, United Kingdom; Grand Slam tournament Grass, outdoor 2 – 15 July 2018 | 36 / 1096 | 4R | (Czech Republic) Jiří Veselý | 93 | Win | 6–3, 6–3, 6–4 |
| Wimbledon Championships; London, United Kingdom; Grand Slam tournament Grass, outdoor 2 – 15 July 2018 | 37 / 1097 | QF | (Argentina) Juan Martín del Potro (5) | 4 | Win | 7–5, 6–7^{(7–9)}, 4–6, 6–4, 6–4 |
| Wimbledon Championships; London, United Kingdom; Grand Slam tournament Grass, outdoor 2 – 15 July 2018 | 38 / 1098 | SF | (Serbia) Novak Djokovic (12) | 21 | Loss | 4–6, 6–3, 6–7^{(9–11)}, 6–3, 8–10 |
Canadian Open; Toronto, Canada; ATP 1000; Hard, outdoor 6 – 12 August 2018
| Canadian Open; Toronto, Canada; ATP 1000; Hard, outdoor 6 – 12 August 2018 | – | 1R | Bye | | | |
| Canadian Open; Toronto, Canada; ATP 1000; Hard, outdoor 6 – 12 August 2018 | 39 / 1099 | 2R | (France) Benoît Paire | 55 | Win | 6–2, 6–3 |
| Canadian Open; Toronto, Canada; ATP 1000; Hard, outdoor 6 – 12 August 2018 | 40 / 1100 | 3R | (Switzerland) Stan Wawrinka (WC) | 195 | Win | 7–5, 7–6^{(7–4)} |
| Canadian Open; Toronto, Canada; ATP 1000; Hard, outdoor 6 – 12 August 2018 | 41 / 1101 | QF | (Croatia) Marin Čilić (6) | 7 | Win | 2–6, 6–4, 6–4 |
| Canadian Open; Toronto, Canada; ATP 1000; Hard, outdoor 6 – 12 August 2018 | 42 / 1102 | SF | (Russia) Karen Khachanov | 38 | Win | 7–6^{(7–3)}, 6–4 |
| Canadian Open; Toronto, Canada; ATP 1000; Hard, outdoor 6 – 12 August 2018 | 43 / 1103 | W | (Greece) Stefanos Tsitsipas | 27 | Win (5) | 6–2, 7–6^{(7–4)} |
Cincinnati Masters; Cincinnati, United States; ATP 1000; Hard, outdoor 13 – 19 August 2018
| Cincinnati Masters; Cincinnati, United States; ATP 1000; Hard, outdoor 13 – 19 August 2018 | Withdrew | | | | | |
US Open; New York City, United States; Grand Slam tournament Hard, outdoor 27 August – 9 September 2018
| US Open; New York City, United States; Grand Slam tournament Hard, outdoor 27 August – 9 September 2018 | 44 / 1104 | 1R | (Spain) David Ferrer | 148 | Win | 6–3, 3–4 ret. |
| US Open; New York City, United States; Grand Slam tournament Hard, outdoor 27 August – 9 September 2018 | 45 / 1105 | 2R | (Canada) Vasek Pospisil | 88 | Win | 6–3, 6–4, 6–2 |
| US Open; New York City, United States; Grand Slam tournament Hard, outdoor 27 August – 9 September 2018 | 46 / 1106 | 3R | (Russia) Karen Khachanov (27) | 26 | Win | 5–7, 7–5, 7–6^{(9–7)}, 7–6^{(7–3)} |
| US Open; New York City, United States; Grand Slam tournament Hard, outdoor 27 August – 9 September 2018 | 47 / 1107 | 4R | (Georgia (country)) Nikoloz Basilashvili | 37 | Win | 6–3, 6–3, 6–7^{(6–8)}, 6–4 |
| US Open; New York City, United States; Grand Slam tournament Hard, outdoor 27 August – 9 September 2018 | 48 / 1108 | QF | (Austria) Dominic Thiem (9) | 9 | Win | 0–6, 6–4, 7–5, 6–7^{(4–7)}, 7–6^{(7–5)} |
| US Open; New York City, United States; Grand Slam tournament Hard, outdoor 27 August – 9 September 2018 | 49 / 1109 | SF | (Argentina) Juan Martín del Potro (3) | 3 | Loss | 6–7^{(3–7)}, 2–6 ret. |
Paris Masters; Paris, France; ATP 1000; Hard, indoor 29 October – 4 November 2018
| Paris Masters; Paris, France; ATP 1000; Hard, indoor 29 October – 4 November 2018 | Withdrew | | | | | |

== Exhibition matches ==
=== Singles ===
| Tournament | Match | Round | Opponent (seed or key) | Rank | Result | Score |
|---|---|---|---|---|---|---|
Kooyong Classic; Melbourne, Australia Hard, outdoor 9 – 12 January 2018
| Kooyong Classic; Melbourne, Australia Hard, outdoor 9 – 12 January 2018 | 1 | 1R | (France) Richard Gasquet | 31 | Loss | 4–6, 5–7 |
Tie Break Tens; Melbourne, Australia Hard, outdoor 10 January 2018
| Tie Break Tens; Melbourne, Australia Hard, outdoor 10 January 2018 | 1 | QF | (France) Lucas Pouille | 18 | Win | [10–1] |
| Tie Break Tens; Melbourne, Australia Hard, outdoor 10 January 2018 | 2 | SF | (Australia) Lleyton Hewitt | – | Win | [13–11] |
| Tie Break Tens; Melbourne, Australia Hard, outdoor 10 January 2018 | 3 | F | (Czech Republic) Tomáš Berdych | 20 | Loss | [5–10] |
Australian Open Preparation; Melbourne, Australia Hard, outdoor 12 January 2018
| Australian Open Preparation; Melbourne, Australia Hard, outdoor 12 January 2018 | 1 | N/A | (Austria) Dominic Thiem | 5 | Win | 6–7^{(4–7)}, 6–2, [10–8] |
Hurlingham Tennis Classic; London, United Kingdom Grass, outdoor 26 – 29 June 2018
| Hurlingham Tennis Classic; London, United Kingdom Grass, outdoor 26 – 29 June 2018 | 1 | N/A | (Australia) Matthew Ebden | 51 | Win | 7–6^{(7–3)}, 7–5 |
| Hurlingham Tennis Classic; London, United Kingdom Grass, outdoor 26 – 29 June 2018 | 2 | N/A | (France) Lucas Pouille | 20 | Loss | 6–7^{(10–12)}, 5–7 |

== Schedule ==
Per Rafael Nadal, this is his current 2018 schedule (subject to change).

=== Singles schedule ===
| Date | Tournament | Location | Category | Surface | Prev. result | Prev. points | New points | Result |
|---|---|---|---|---|---|---|---|---|
| 15 January 2018– 28 January 2018 | Australian Open | Melbourne (AUS) | Grand Slam | Hard | F | 1200 | 360 | Quarterfinals (lost to Marin Čilić, 6–3, 3–6, 7–6^{(7–5)}, 2–6, 0–2 ret.) |
| 26 February 2018– 3 March 2018 | Mexican Open | Acapulco (MEX) | 500 Series | Hard | F | 300 | N/A | Withdrew due to hip injury |
| 6 April 2018– 8 April 2018 | Davis Cup World Group QF | Valencia (ESP) | Davis Cup | Clay | A | N/A | N/A | Spain defeated Germany, 3–2 |
| 15 April 2018– 22 April 2018 | Monte-Carlo Masters | Monte Carlo (MON) | Masters 1000 | Clay | W | 1000 | 1000 | Champion (defeated Kei Nishikori, 6–3, 6–2) |
| 23 April 2018– 29 April 2018 | Barcelona Open | Barcelona (ESP) | 500 Series | Clay | W | 500 | 500 | Champion (defeated Stefanos Tsitsipas, 6–2, 6–1) |
| 7 May 2018– 13 May 2018 | Madrid Open | Madrid (ESP) | Masters 1000 | Clay | W | 1000 | 180 | Quarterfinals (lost to Dominic Thiem, 5–7, 3–6) |
| 14 May 2018– 20 May 2018 | Italian Open | Rome (ITA) | Masters 1000 | Clay | QF | 180 | 1000 | Champion (defeated Alexander Zverev, 6–1, 1–6, 6–3) |
| 28 May 2018– 10 June 2018 | French Open | Paris (FRA) | Grand Slam | Clay | W | 2000 | 2000 | Champion (defeated Dominic Thiem, 6–4, 6–3, 6–2) |
| 2 July 2018– 15 July 2018 | Wimbledon | London (GBR) | Grand Slam | Grass | 4R | 180 | 720 | Semifinals (lost to Novak Djokovic, 4–6, 6–3, 6–7^{(9–11)}, 6–3, 8–10) |
| 6 August 2018– 12 August 2018 | Canadian Open | Toronto (CAN) | Masters 1000 | Hard | 3R | 90 | 1000 | Champion (defeated Stefanos Tsitsipas, 6–2, 7–6^{(7–4)}) |
| 13 August 2018– 19 August 2018 | Cincinnati Masters | Cincinnati (USA) | Masters 1000 | Hard | QF | 180 | N/A | Withdrew due to schedule change |
| 27 August 2018– 9 September 2018 | US Open | New York (USA) | Grand Slam | Hard | W | 2000 | 720 | Semifinals (lost to Juan Martín del Potro, 6–7^{(3–7)}, 2–6 ret.) |
| 29 October 2018– 4 November 2018 | Paris Masters | Paris (FRA) | Masters 1000 | Hard (i) | QF | 180 | N/A | Withdrew due to abdominal injury |
| Total year-end points | | | | | | 10645 | 7480 | ▼3165 difference |

== Yearly records ==
=== Head-to-head matchups ===
Rafael Nadal had a 45–4 ATP match win–loss record in the 2018 season. His record against players who were part of the ATP rankings Top Ten at the time of their meetings was 10–3. Bold indicates player was ranked top 10 at time of at least one meeting. The following list is ordered by number of wins:

- (Russia) Karen Khachanov 3–0
- (Argentina) Diego Schwartzman 3–0
- (Austria) **Dominic Thiem** 3–1
- (Bosnia and Herzegovina) Damir Džumhur 2–0
- (Greece) Stefanos Tsitsipas 2–0
- (Germany) **Alexander Zverev** 2–0
- (Argentina) **Juan Martín del Potro** 2–1
- (Georgia (country)) Nikoloz Basilashvili 1–0
- (Slovenia) Aljaž Bedene 1–0
- (Italy) Simone Bolelli 1–0
- (Spain) Roberto Carballés Baena 1–0
- (Australia) Alex de Minaur 1–0
- (Bulgaria) **Grigor Dimitrov** 1–0
- (Dominican Republic) Víctor Estrella Burgos 1–0
- (Spain) David Ferrer 1–0
- (Italy) Fabio Fognini 1–0
- (Spain) Guillermo García López 1–0
- (France) Richard Gasquet 1–0
- (Belgium) **David Goffin** 1–0
- (Slovakia) Martin Kližan 1–0
- (Germany) Philipp Kohlschreiber 1–0
- (Kazakhstan) Mikhail Kukushkin 1–0
- (Germany) Maximilian Marterer 1–0
- (Argentina) Leonardo Mayer 1–0
- (France) Gaël Monfils 1–0
- (Japan) Kei Nishikori 1–0
- (France) Benoît Paire 1–0
- (Argentina) Guido Pella 1–0
- (Canada) Vasek Pospisil 1–0
- (Israel) Dudi Sela 1–0
- (Canada) Denis Shapovalov 1–0
- (Czech Republic) Jiří Veselý 1–0
- (Switzerland) Stan Wawrinka 1–0
- (Croatia) **Marin Čilić** 1–1
- (Serbia) Novak Djokovic 1–1

=== Finals ===
==== Singles: 5 (5 titles) ====
| Category Grand Slam (1–0) ATP Finals (0–0) ATP World Tour Masters 1000 (3–0) ATP World Tour 500 (1–0) ATP World Tour 250 (0–0) | Titles by surface Hard (1–0) Clay (4–0) Grass (0–0) | Titles by setting Outdoor (5–0) Indoor (0–0) |

| Result | W–L | Date | Tournament | Tier | Surface | Opponent | Score |
|---|---|---|---|---|---|---|---|
| Win | 1–0 | Apr 2018 | Monte-Carlo Masters, Monaco (11) | Masters 1000 | Clay | (Japan) Kei Nishikori | 6–3, 6–2 |
| Win | 2–0 | Apr 2018 | Barcelona Open, Spain (11) | 500 Series | Clay | (Greece) Stefanos Tsitsipas | 6–2, 6–1 |
| Win | 3–0 | May 2018 | Italian Open, Italy (8) | Masters 1000 | Clay | (Germany) Alexander Zverev | 6–1, 1–6, 6–3 |
| Win | 4–0 | Jun 2018 | French Open, France (11) | Grand Slam | Clay | (Austria) Dominic Thiem | 6–4, 6–3, 6–2 |
| Win | 5–0 | Aug 2018 | Canadian Open, Canada (4) | Masters 1000 | Hard | (Greece) Stefanos Tsitsipas | 6–2, 7–6^{(7–4)} |

=== Earnings ===
- **Bold** font denotes tournament win

| Event | Prize money | Year-to-date |
|---|---|---|
| Australian Open | A$440,000 | $348,128 |
| **Monte-Carlo Masters** | €935,385 | $1,501,270 |
| **Barcelona Open** | €501,700 | $2,117,558 |
| Madrid Open | €149,390 | $2,296,214 |
| **Italian Open** | €935,385 | $3,412,970 |
| **French Open** | €2,200,000 | $5,975,970 |
| Wimbledon | £562,000 | $6,717,922 |
| **Canadian Open** | $1,020,425 | $7,738,347 |
| US Open | $925,000 | $8,663,347 |
| | | $8,663,347 |

Figures in United States dollars (USD) unless noted.

== Television ==
Some of Nadal's matches had significant audiences on Spanish television:

- At the Madrid Open, the round of 16 match versus Diego Schwartzman had an average 5.2% share and 780,000 viewers on Teledeporte, and the quarter-finals match versus Dominic Thiem had an average 7.9% share on Telemadrid.
- At the French Open, the semifinals match versus Juan Martín del Potro had an average 3.4% share and 419,000 viewers, and the final match versus Dominic Thiem averaged 6.5% share and 877,000 viewers, both on Eurosport.
- At the Wimbledon Championships, the semifinals match versus Novak Djokovic had an average 2.3% share and 244,000 viewers on Movistar #0, and an average 1.6% share and 175,000 viewers on Movistar Deportes.
- At the Davis Cup quarter-finals tie versus Germany, the Saturday matches had an average 4.4% share on Teledeporte, and the Sunday matches had an average 5.6% share on Teledeporte.

== See also ==
- 2018 ATP World Tour
- 2018 Roger Federer tennis season
- 2018 Novak Djokovic tennis season
- 2018 Juan Martín del Potro tennis season
