= 2018 Italian Open – Women's doubles =

Women's doubles
- 2018 Italian Open

Final
- Champions: (Australia) Ashleigh Barty (Netherlands) Demi Schuurs
- Runners-up: (Czech Republic) Andrea Sestini Hlaváčková (Czech Republic) Barbora Strýcová
- Score: 6–3, 6–4

Details
- Draw: 28
- Seeds: 8

Events
Singles	men	women
Doubles	men	women
← 2017 ·	Italian Open	· 2019 →

Latisha Chan and Martina Hingis were the defending champions, but Hingis retired from professional tennis at the end of 2017. Chan played alongside Bethanie Mattek-Sands, but lost in the first round to Svetlana Kuznetsova and Karolína Plíšková.

Ashleigh Barty and Demi Schuurs won the title, defeating Andrea Sestini Hlaváčková and Barbora Strýcová in the final 6–3, 6–4.

Ekaterina Makarova and Elena Vesnina were in contention for the No. 1 ranking but withdrew before their opening match.

== Seeds ==
The top four seeds received a bye into the second round.

1. (Russia) Ekaterina Makarova / (Russia) Elena Vesnina (withdrew)
2. (Czech Republic) Andrea Sestini Hlaváčková / (Czech Republic) Barbora Strýcová (final)
3. (Hungary) Tímea Babos / (France) Kristina Mladenovic (quarterfinals)
4. (Canada) Gabriela Dabrowski / (China) Xu Yifan (quarterfinals)
5. (Chinese Taipei) Latisha Chan / (United States) Bethanie Mattek-Sands (first round)
6. (Czech Republic) Barbora Krejčíková / (Czech Republic) Kateřina Siniaková (first round)
7. (Slovenia) Andreja Klepač / (Spain) María José Martínez Sánchez (first round)
8. (Australia) Ashleigh Barty / (Netherlands) Demi Schuurs (champions)

== Draw ==
=== Key ===
- Q = Qualifier
- WC = Wild card
- LL = Lucky loser
- Alt = Alternate
- ITF = ITF entry
- PR = Protected ranking
- SR = Special ranking
- SE = Special exempt
- JE = Junior exempt
- JR = Junior Accelerator Programme entrant
- CO = College Accelerator Programme entrant
- NG = Next Gen Accelerator Program entrant
- w/o = Walkover
- r = Retired
- d = Defaulted

=== Finals ===
Semifinals
8	(Australia) Ashleigh Barty (Netherlands) Demi Schuurs	6	6
(Romania) Sorana Cîrstea (Latvia) Jeļena Ostapenko	2	3
(United States) Raquel Atawo (Germany) Anna-Lena Grönefeld	2	4
2	(Czech Republic) Andrea Sestini Hlaváčková (Czech Republic) Barbora Strýcová	6	6

Final
8	(Australia) Ashleigh Barty (Netherlands) Demi Schuurs	6	6
2	(Czech Republic) Andrea Sestini Hlaváčková (Czech Republic) Barbora Strýcová	3	4

=== Top half ===
First round
(Australia) D Gavrilova (Chinese Taipei) S-w Hsieh	6	6
(Poland) A Rosolska (United States) A Spears	4	4
(Russia) A Kudryavtseva (Czech Republic) R Voráčová	3	6	[10]
(Spain) L Arruabarrena (Romania) I-C Begu	6	3	[5]
(United States) N Melichar (Czech Republic) K Peschke	3	2
8	(Australia) A Barty (Netherlands) D Schuurs	6	6
WC	(Italy) S Errani (Italy) M Trevisan	7	7^{7}
(China) S Peng (China) Y Wang	5	6^{1}
(Romania) S Cîrstea (Latvia) J Ostapenko	7^{7}	6
(Slovakia) M Rybáriková (Latvia) A Sevastova	6^{4}	3
(Russia) S Kuznetsova (Czech Republic) Ka Plíšková	7	7^{7}
5	(Chinese Taipei) L Chan (United States) B Mattek-Sands	5	6^{3}

Second round
Alt	(United Kingdom) J Konta (China) S Zhang
(Australia) D Gavrilova (Chinese Taipei) S-w Hsieh	w/o
(Russia) A Kudryavtseva (Czech Republic) R Voráčová	6	4	[2]
8	(Australia) A Barty (Netherlands) D Schuurs	4	6	[10]
3	(Hungary) T Babos (France) K Mladenovic	6	6
WC	(Italy) S Errani (Italy) M Trevisan	0	3
(Romania) S Cîrstea (Latvia) J Ostapenko	6	6
(Russia) S Kuznetsova (Czech Republic) Ka Plíšková	3	3

Quarterfinals
(Australia) D Gavrilova (Chinese Taipei) S-w Hsieh	6	3	[5]
8	(Australia) A Barty (Netherlands) D Schuurs	3	6	[10]
3	(Hungary) T Babos (France) K Mladenovic	2	5
(Romania) S Cîrstea (Latvia) J Ostapenko	6	7

Semifinals
8	(Australia) A Barty (Netherlands) D Schuurs	6	6
(Romania) S Cîrstea (Latvia) J Ostapenko	2	3

=== Bottom half ===
First round
6	(Czech Republic) B Krejčíková (Czech Republic) K Siniaková	6	1	[8]
(United States) M Keys (United States) V Williams	2	6	[10]
(United States) R Atawo (Germany) A-L Grönefeld	6	6
WC	(Ukraine) O Savchuk (Ukraine) E Svitolina	1	1
(Ukraine) N Kichenok (Australia) An Rodionova	3	7	[13]
(Australia) M Adamczak (Ukraine) L Kichenok	6	5	[11]
7	(Slovenia) A Klepač (Spain) MJ Martínez Sánchez	6^{4}	4
PR	(Spain) A Medina Garrigues (Spain) A Parra Santonja	7^{7}	6
PR	(United States) V King (Slovenia) K Srebotnik	7	6
WC	(Italy) D Chiesa (Italy) A Matteucci	5	0
(Chinese Taipei) H-c Chan (China) Z Yang	6	6
(Japan) S Aoyama (Japan) M Kato	4	4

Second round
(United States) M Keys (United States) V Williams
(United States) R Atawo (Germany) A-L Grönefeld	w/o
(Ukraine) N Kichenok (Australia) An Rodionova	4	3
4	(Canada) G Dabrowski (China) Y Xu	6	6
PR	(Spain) A Medina Garrigues (Spain) A Parra Santonja	4	7^{7}	[9]
PR	(United States) V King (Slovenia) K Srebotnik	6	6^{4}	[11]
(Chinese Taipei) H-c Chan (China) Z Yang	2	4
2	(Czech Republic) A Sestini Hlaváčková (Czech Republic) B Strýcová	6	6

Quarterfinals
(United States) R Atawo (Germany) A-L Grönefeld	7^{7}	6
4	(Canada) G Dabrowski (China) Y Xu	6^{5}	1
PR	(United States) V King (Slovenia) K Srebotnik	4	2
2	(Czech Republic) A Sestini Hlaváčková (Czech Republic) B Strýcová	6	6

Semifinals
(United States) R Atawo (Germany) A-L Grönefeld	2	4
2	(Czech Republic) A Sestini Hlaváčková (Czech Republic) B Strýcová	6	6
