= 2018 Italian Open – Women's singles =

Women's singles
- 2018 Italian Open

Final
- Champion: (Ukraine) Elina Svitolina
- Runner-up: (Romania) Simona Halep
- Score: 6–0, 6–4

Details
- Draw: 56 (8 Q / 5 WC )
- Seeds: 16

Events
Singles	men	women
Doubles	men	women
← 2017 ·	Italian Open	· 2019 →

Defending champion Elina Svitolina defeated Simona Halep in a rematch of the previous year's final, 6–0, 6–4 to win the women's singles tennis title at the 2018 Italian Open.

Halep and Caroline Wozniacki were in contention for the WTA no. 1 singles ranking at the beginning of the tournament. Halep retained the top ranking when Wozniacki lost in the quarterfinals.

This tournament marked the retirement of former US Open finalist Roberta Vinci. She lost in the first round to Aleksandra Krunić.

== Seeds ==
The top eight seeds received a bye into the second round.

1. (Romania) Simona Halep (final)
2. (Denmark) Caroline Wozniacki (quarterfinals)
3. (Spain) Garbiñe Muguruza (second round)
4. (Ukraine) Elina Svitolina (champion)
5. (Latvia) Jeļena Ostapenko (quarterfinals)
6. (Czech Republic) Karolína Plíšková (second round)
7. (France) Caroline Garcia (quarterfinals)
8. (United States) Venus Williams (third round)
9. (United States) Sloane Stephens (third round)
10. (Czech Republic) Petra Kvitová (withdrew)
11. (Germany) Angelique Kerber (quarterfinals)
12. (United States) CoCo Vandeweghe (first round)
13. (United States) Madison Keys (third round, withdrew)
14. (Russia) Daria Kasatkina (third round)
15. (Latvia) Anastasija Sevastova (third round)
16. (Australia) Ashleigh Barty (first round)
17. (Slovakia) Magdaléna Rybáriková (first round)

Click on the seed number of a player to go to their draw section.

== Draw ==
=== Key ===
- Q = Qualifier
- WC = Wild card
- LL = Lucky loser
- Alt = Alternate
- ITF = ITF entry
- PR = Protected ranking
- SR = Special ranking
- SE = Special exempt
- JE = Junior exempt
- JR = Junior Accelerator Programme entrant
- CO = College Accelerator Programme entrant
- NG = Next Gen Accelerator Program entrant
- w/o = Walkover
- r = Retired
- d = Defaulted

=== Finals ===
Quarterfinals
1	(Romania) Simona Halep	6	6
7	(France) Caroline Garcia	2	3
(Russia) Maria Sharapova	6^{6}	6	7
5	(Latvia) Jeļena Ostapenko	7^{8}	4	5
11	(Germany) Angelique Kerber	4	4
4	(Ukraine) Elina Svitolina	6	6
(Estonia) Anett Kontaveit	6	6
2	(Denmark) Caroline Wozniacki	3	1

Semifinals
1	(Romania) Simona Halep	4	6	6
(Russia) Maria Sharapova	6	1	4
4	(Ukraine) Elina Svitolina	6	6
(Estonia) Anett Kontaveit	4	3

Final
1	(Romania) Simona Halep	0	4
4	(Ukraine) Elina Svitolina	6	6

=== Top half ===
==== Section 1 ====
First round
PR	(Belarus) V Azarenka	0	3
(Japan) N Osaka	6	6
(Spain) C Suárez Navarro	1	2
Q	(Croatia) D Vekić	6	6
(Russia) A Pavlyuchenkova	4	1
13	(United States) M Keys	6	6
9	(United States) S Stephens	6^{4}	6	6
(Czech Republic) B Strýcová	7^{7}	3	1
Q	(Estonia) K Kanepi	6	6
WC	(Italy) C Rosatello	1	2
(Hungary) T Babos	6	7^{8}
WC	(Italy) S Errani	3	6^{6}

Second round
1	(Romania) S Halep	6	6
(Japan) N Osaka	1	0
Q	(Croatia) D Vekić	6^{2}	6^{0}
13	(United States) M Keys	7^{7}	7^{7}
9	(United States) S Stephens	6	5	6
Q	(Estonia) K Kanepi	0	7	4
(Hungary) T Babos	3	4
7	(France) C Garcia	6	6

Third round
1	(Romania) S Halep	w/o
13	(United States) M Keys
9	(United States) S Stephens	1	6^{7}
7	(France) C Garcia	6	7^{9}

Quarterfinals
1	(Romania) S Halep	6	6
7	(France) C Garcia	2	3

==== Section 2 ====
First round
(Australia) D Gavrilova	5	6	6
Q	(Russia) N Vikhlyantseva	7	4	3
WC	(Italy) F Schiavone	1	7^{7}	2
(Slovakia) D Cibulková	6	6^{5}	6
(Russia) M Sharapova	7	3	6
16	(Australia) A Barty	5	6	2
17	(Slovakia) M Rybáriková	4	3
(United Kingdom) J Konta	6	6
Q	(Chinese Taipei) S-w Hsieh	6	6
LL	(Belarus) A Sabalenka	2	4
(China) S Zhang	6	7^{7}
(Romania) M Buzărnescu	3	6^{2}

Second round
3	(Spain) G Muguruza	7	2	6^{6}
(Australia) D Gavrilova	5	6	7^{8}
(Slovakia) D Cibulková	6	4	2
(Russia) M Sharapova	3	6	6
(United Kingdom) J Konta	6	6
Q	(Chinese Taipei) S-w Hsieh	0	4
(China) S Zhang	2	5
5	(Latvia) J Ostapenko	6	7

Third round
(Australia) D Gavrilova	3	4
(Russia) M Sharapova	6	6
(United Kingdom) J Konta	6	3	4
5	(Latvia) J Ostapenko	2	6	6

Quarterfinals
(Russia) M Sharapova	6^{6}	6	7
5	(Latvia) J Ostapenko	7^{8}	4	5

=== Bottom half ===
==== Section 3 ====
First round
(Netherlands) K Bertens	2	6	3
(Greece) M Sakkari	6	4	6
(Romania) I-C Begu	4	6	6
(China) S Peng	6	4	1
LL	(Kazakhstan) Z Diyas	2	6^{6}
11	(Germany) A Kerber	6	7^{8}
14	(Russia) D Kasatkina	6	6
Q	(Australia) A Tomljanović	0	4
Q	(United States) D Collins	6	4	6
(Romania) S Cîrstea	3	6	4
(Croatia) P Martić	6	6
(Ukraine) L Tsurenko	1	2

Second round
6	(Czech Republic) Ka Plíšková	6	3	5
(Greece) M Sakkari	3	6	7
(Romania) I-C Begu	6	5	5
11	(Germany) A Kerber	3	7	7
14	(Russia) D Kasatkina	6	6
Q	(United States) D Collins	2	3
(Croatia) P Martić	1	2
4	(Ukraine) E Svitolina	6	6

Third round
(Greece) M Sakkari	1	1
11	(Germany) A Kerber	6	6
14	(Russia) D Kasatkina	6	3	2
4	(Ukraine) E Svitolina	0	6	6

Quarterfinals
11	(Germany) A Kerber	4	4
4	(Ukraine) E Svitolina	6	6

==== Section 4 ====
First round
(Russia) E Vesnina	7^{7}	6
PR	(Germany) L Siegemund	6^{5}	2
(Russia) S Kuznetsova	6	6
Q	(Slovenia) P Hercog	2	4
(Estonia) A Kontaveit	6	6
12	(United States) C Vandeweghe	1	1
15	(Latvia) A Sevastova	6	3
(France) K Mladenovic	3	0^{r}
LL	(Serbia) A Krunić	2	6	6
WC	(Italy) R Vinci	6	0	3
WC	(Australia) S Stosur	7^{8}	3	2
Q	(Belgium) A Van Uytvanck	6^{6}	6	6

Second round
8	(United States) V Williams	6	4	7
(Russia) E Vesnina	2	6	5
(Russia) S Kuznetsova	5	5
(Estonia) A Kontaveit	7	7
15	(Latvia) A Sevastova	6	6
LL	(Serbia) A Krunić	4	4
Q	(Belgium) A Van Uytvanck	1	4
2	(Denmark) C Wozniacki	6	6

Third round
8	(United States) V Williams	2	6^{3}
(Estonia) A Kontaveit	6	7^{7}
15	(Latvia) A Sevastova	2	7	3
2	(Denmark) C Wozniacki	6	5	6

Quarterfinals
(Estonia) A Kontaveit	6	6
2	(Denmark) C Wozniacki	3	1

== Qualifying ==
=== Seeds ===
1. (Serbia) Aleksandra Krunić (qualifying competition, lucky loser)
2. (Belarus) Aryna Sabalenka (qualifying competition, lucky loser)
3. (Belgium) Alison Van Uytvanck (qualified)
4. (United States) Danielle Collins (qualified)
5. (Croatia) Donna Vekić (qualified)
6. (Czech Republic) Kateřina Siniaková (qualifying competition)
7. (Chinese Taipei) Hsieh Su-wei (qualified)
8. (Kazakhstan) Zarina Diyas (qualifying competition, lucky loser)
9. (Italy) Camila Giorgi (qualifying competition)
10. (Belarus) Aliaksandra Sasnovich (first round)
11. (Estonia) Kaia Kanepi (qualified)
12. (Romania) Monica Niculescu (withdrew)
13. (Slovenia) Polona Hercog (qualified)
14. (China) Wang Qiang (qualifying competition)
15. (Puerto Rico) Monica Puig (qualifying competition, retired)
16. (Poland) Magda Linette (first round)

=== Qualifiers ===
1. (Slovenia) Polona Hercog
2. (Russia) Natalia Vikhlyantseva
3. (Belgium) Alison Van Uytvanck
4. (United States) Danielle Collins
5. (Croatia) Donna Vekić
6. (Estonia) Kaia Kanepi
7. (Chinese Taipei) Hsieh Su-wei
8. (Australia) Ajla Tomljanović

=== Lucky losers ===
1. (Serbia) Aleksandra Krunić
2. (Belarus) Aryna Sabalenka
3. (Kazakhstan) Zarina Diyas

=== Qualifying draw ===
==== First qualifier ====
First round
1	(Serbia) Aleksandra Krunić	6	6
(China) Wang Yafan	4	4
WC	(Italy) Federica Di Sarra	3	3
13	(Slovenia) Polona Hercog	6	6

Qualifying competition
1	(Serbia) Aleksandra Krunić	6^{4}	4
13	(Slovenia) Polona Hercog	7^{7}	6

==== Second qualifier ====
First round
2	(Belarus) Aryna Sabalenka	6	1	6
(United States) Alison Riske	3	6	3
(Russia) Natalia Vikhlyantseva	6	5	7
Alt	(United States) Bernarda Pera	4	7	5

Qualifying competition
2	(Belarus) Aryna Sabalenka	2	6	4
(Russia) Natalia Vikhlyantseva	6	1	6

==== Third qualifier ====
First round
3	(Belgium) Alison Van Uytvanck	7	1	6
PR	(United States) Bethanie Mattek-Sands	5	6	1
(Spain) Lara Arruabarrena	6^{4}	1
14	(China) Wang Qiang	7^{7}	6

Qualifying competition
3	(Belgium) Alison Van Uytvanck	3	6	6
14	(China) Wang Qiang	6	3	1

==== Fourth qualifier ====
First round
4	(United States) Danielle Collins	6	6
(United States) Varvara Lepchenko	2	3
WC	(Italy) Deborah Chiesa	2	3
9	(Italy) Camila Giorgi	6	6

Qualifying competition
4	(United States) Danielle Collins	2	6	6
9	(Italy) Camila Giorgi	6	4	2

==== Fifth qualifier ====
First round
5	(Croatia) Donna Vekić	3	6	6
(United States) Jennifer Brady	6	3	1
WC	(Italy) Martina Trevisan	2	5
15	(Puerto Rico) Monica Puig	6	7

Qualifying competition
5	(Croatia) Donna Vekić	4
15	(Puerto Rico) Monica Puig	1^{r}

==== Sixth qualifier ====
First round
6	(Czech Republic) Kateřina Siniaková	6	6
(United States) Christina McHale	3	2
(United States) Sofia Kenin	6	2	2
11	(Estonia) Kaia Kanepi	2	6	6

Qualifying competition
6	(Czech Republic) Kateřina Siniaková	3	6	3
11	(Estonia) Kaia Kanepi	6	3	6

==== Seventh qualifier ====
First round
7	(Chinese Taipei) Hsieh Su-wei	1	7	6
(Kazakhstan) Yulia Putintseva	6	5	3
(Germany) Mona Barthel	7	6
10	(Belarus) Aliaksandra Sasnovich	5	2

Qualifying competition
7	(Chinese Taipei) Hsieh Su-wei	6	7^{7}
(Germany) Mona Barthel	2	6^{3}

==== Eighth qualifier ====
First round
8	(Kazakhstan) Zarina Diyas	6	7^{7}
WC	(Italy) Anastasia Grymalska	4	6^{4}
(Australia) Ajla Tomljanović	6	3	6
16	(Poland) Magda Linette	2	6	4

Qualifying competition
8	(Kazakhstan) Zarina Diyas	6^{4}	3
(Australia) Ajla Tomljanović	7^{7}	6
