= 2018 Monte-Carlo Masters – Doubles =

Doubles
- 2018 Monte-Carlo Masters

Final
- Champions: (United States) Bob Bryan (United States) Mike Bryan
- Runners-up: (Austria) Oliver Marach (Croatia) Mate Pavić
- Score: 7–6^{(7–5)}, 6–3

Events
Singles	Doubles
← 2017 ·	Monte-Carlo Masters	· 2019 →

Rohan Bopanna and Pablo Cuevas were the defending champions, but chose not to participate together. Bopanna played alongside Édouard Roger-Vasselin, but lost in the semifinals to Oliver Marach and Mate Pavić. Cuevas teamed up with Marcel Granollers, but lost in the quarterfinals to Bob and Mike Bryan.

The Bryan brothers went on to win the title, beating Marach and Pavić in the final, 7–6^{(7–5)}, 6–3.

== Seeds ==
All seeds received a bye into the second round.

1. (Poland) Łukasz Kubot / (Brazil) Marcelo Melo (second round)
2. (Finland) Henri Kontinen / (Australia) John Peers (second round)
3. (Austria) Oliver Marach / (Croatia) Mate Pavić (final)
4. (United States) Bob Bryan / (United States) Mike Bryan (champions)
5. (France) Pierre-Hugues Herbert / (France) Nicolas Mahut (second round)
6. (Netherlands) Jean-Julien Rojer / (Romania) Horia Tecău (withdrew)
7. (United Kingdom) Jamie Murray / (Brazil) Bruno Soares (second round)
8. (Croatia) Ivan Dodig / (United States) Rajeev Ram (second round)

== Draw ==
=== Key ===
- Q = Qualifier
- WC = Wild card
- LL = Lucky loser
- Alt = Alternate
- ITF = ITF entry
- PR = Protected ranking
- SR = Special ranking
- SE = Special exempt
- JE = Junior exempt
- JR = Junior Accelerator Programme entrant
- CO = College Accelerator Programme entrant
- NG = Next Gen Accelerator Program entrant
- w/o = Walkover
- r = Retired
- d = Defaulted

=== Finals ===
Semifinals
WC	(Italy) Simone Bolelli (Italy) Fabio Fognini	6	3	[7]
4	(United States) Bob Bryan (United States) Mike Bryan	4	6	[10]
3	(Austria) Oliver Marach (Croatia) Mate Pavić	7^{7}	4	[10]
(India) Rohan Bopanna (France) Édouard Roger-Vasselin	6^{4}	6	[7]

Final
4	(United States) Bob Bryan (United States) Mike Bryan	7^{7}	6
3	(Austria) Oliver Marach (Croatia) Mate Pavić	6^{5}	3

=== Top half ===
First round
WC	(Italy) S Bolelli (Italy) F Fognini	w/o
(Czech Republic) T Berdych (Spain) F Verdasco
(France) L Pouille (Russia) A Rublev	1	1
(South Africa) R Klaasen (New Zealand) M Venus	6	6
(Mexico) S González (Japan) B McLachlan	4	6^{2}
WC	(Monaco) R Arneodo (France) H Nys	6	7^{7}
(Uruguay) P Cuevas (Spain) M Granollers	6	3	[10]
Alt	(Bosnia and Herzegovina) D Džumhur (Pakistan) A-u-H Qureshi	2	6	[6]

Second round
1	(Poland) Ł Kubot (Brazil) M Melo	6	2	[7]
WC	(Italy) S Bolelli (Italy) F Fognini	2	6	[10]
(South Africa) R Klaasen (New Zealand) M Venus	w/o
6	(Netherlands) J-J Rojer (Romania) H Tecău
4	(United States) B Bryan (United States) M Bryan	6^{5}	6	[11]
WC	(Monaco) R Arneodo (France) H Nys	7^{7}	0	[9]
(Uruguay) P Cuevas (Spain) M Granollers	7	7^{7}
5	(France) P-H Herbert (France) N Mahut	5	6^{4}

Quarterfinals
WC	(Italy) S Bolelli (Italy) F Fognini	7^{10}	6
(South Africa) R Klaasen (New Zealand) M Venus	6^{8}	3
4	(United States) B Bryan (United States) M Bryan	7^{7}	6^{5}	[10]
(Uruguay) P Cuevas (Spain) M Granollers	6^{5}	7^{7}	[5]

Semifinals
WC	(Italy) S Bolelli (Italy) F Fognini	6	3	[7]
4	(United States) B Bryan (United States) M Bryan	4	6	[10]

=== Bottom half ===
First round
(Bulgaria) G Dimitrov (Belgium) D Goffin	7^{7}	6
(France) A Mannarino (France) F Martin	6^{3}	2
(Germany) A Zverev (Germany) M Zverev	6	4	[10]
(Argentina) A Molteni (Argentina) D Schwartzman	2	6	[8]
Alt	(United States) J Cerretani (Italy) A Seppi	1	5
(India) R Bopanna (France) É Roger-Vasselin	6	7
(Spain) F López (Spain) M López	3	4
(Colombia) JS Cabal (Colombia) R Farah	6	6

Second round
8	(Croatia) I Dodig (United States) R Ram	7	6^{4}	[8]
(Bulgaria) G Dimitrov (Belgium) D Goffin	5	7^{7}	[10]
(Germany) A Zverev (Germany) M Zverev	2	1
3	(Austria) O Marach (Croatia) M Pavić	6	6
7	(United Kingdom) J Murray (Brazil) B Soares	6	4	[9]
(India) R Bopanna (France) É Roger-Vasselin	3	6	[11]
(Colombia) JS Cabal (Colombia) R Farah	5	6	[18]
2	(Finland) H Kontinen (Australia) J Peers	7	2	[16]

Quarterfinals
(Bulgaria) G Dimitrov (Belgium) D Goffin
3	(Austria) O Marach (Croatia) M Pavić	w/o
(India) R Bopanna (France) É Roger-Vasselin	6	6
(Colombia) JS Cabal (Colombia) R Farah	4	4

Semifinals
3	(Austria) O Marach (Croatia) M Pavić	7^{7}	4	[10]
(India) R Bopanna (France) É Roger-Vasselin	6^{4}	6	[7]
