= 2018 Monte-Carlo Masters – Singles =

Singles
- 2018 Monte-Carlo Masters

Final
- Champion: (Spain) Rafael Nadal
- Runner-up: (Japan) Kei Nishikori
- Score: 6–3, 6–2

Details
- Draw: 56 (7 Q / 4 WC )
- Seeds: 16

Events
| Singles | Doubles |
- Monte-Carlo Masters

Two-time defending champion Rafael Nadal defeated Kei Nishikori in the final, 6–3, 6–2 to win the singles tennis title at the 2018 Monte-Carlo Masters. It was his record-extending 11th Monte-Carlo Masters title and his record 31st Masters title. Nadal also became the first man in the Open Era to win 11 titles at the same tournament. By winning the title, Nadal also retained the ATP no. 1 singles ranking. He did not lose a single set during the tournament, losing no more than 5 games per match, and lost just 21 games in total.

== Seeds ==
The top eight seeds receive a bye into the second round.

1. (Spain) Rafael Nadal (champion)
2. (Croatia) Marin Čilić (quarterfinals)
3. (Germany) Alexander Zverev (semifinals)
4. (Bulgaria) Grigor Dimitrov (semifinals)
5. (Austria) Dominic Thiem (quarterfinals)
6. (Belgium) David Goffin (quarterfinals)
7. (France) Lucas Pouille (second round)
8. (Spain) Pablo Carreño Busta (withdrew)

9. (Serbia) Novak Djokovic (third round)
10. (Argentina) Diego Schwartzman (second round)
11. (Spain) Roberto Bautista Agut (third round)
12. (Czech Republic) Tomáš Berdych (first round)
13. (Italy) Fabio Fognini (second round)
14. (Canada) Milos Raonic (third round, withdrew due to knee injury)
15. (Spain) Albert Ramos Viñolas (second round)
16. (France) Adrian Mannarino (first round)

Click on the seed number of a player to go to their draw section.

== Draw ==
Key

- Q = Qualifier
- WC = Wild card
- LL = Lucky loser
- Alt = Alternate
- ITF = ITF entry
- PR = Protected ranking
- SR = Special ranking
- SE = Special exempt
- JE = Junior exempt
- JR = Junior Accelerator Programme entrant
- CO = College Accelerator Programme entrant
- NG = Next Gen Accelerator Program entrant
- w/o = Walkover
- r = Retired
- d = Defaulted

=== Finals ===
Quarterfinals
1 | (Spain) Rafael Nadal | 6 | 6
5 | (Austria) Dominic Thiem | 0 | 2
4 | (Bulgaria) Grigor Dimitrov | 6 | 7^{7}
6 | (Belgium) David Goffin | 4 | 6^{5}
(France) Richard Gasquet | 6 | 2 | 5
3 | (Germany) Alexander Zverev | 4 | 6 | 7
(Japan) Kei Nishikori | 6 | 6^{1} | 6
2 | (Croatia) Marin Čilić | 4 | 7^{7} | 3

Semifinals
1 | (Spain) Rafael Nadal | 6 | 6
4 | (Bulgaria) Grigor Dimitrov | 4 | 1
3 | (Germany) Alexander Zverev | 6 | 3 | 4
(Japan) Kei Nishikori | 3 | 6 | 6

Final
1 | (Spain) Rafael Nadal | 6 | 6
(Japan) Kei Nishikori | 3 | 2

=== Top half ===
==== Section 1 ====
First round
(Slovenia) A Bedene | 6 | 7^{7}
LL | (Bosnia and Herzegovina) M Bašić | 4 | 6^{3}
WC | (Australia) T Kokkinakis | 5 | 4
(Russia) K Khachanov | 7 | 6
WC | (France) G Simon | 6 | 4 | 6
16 | (France) A Mannarino | 3 | 6 | 2
9 | (Serbia) N Djokovic | 6 | 6
Q | (Serbia) D Lajović | 0 | 1
(Croatia) B Ćorić | 6 | 6
(France) J Benneteau | 2 | 3
(Russia) A Rublev | 7^{9} | 2 | 7
(Netherlands) R Haase | 6^{7} | 6 | 5

Second round
1 | (Spain) R Nadal | 6 | 6
(Slovenia) A Bedene | 1 | 3
(Russia) K Khachanov | 6 | 6
WC | (France) G Simon | 2 | 2
9 | (Serbia) N Djokovic | 7^{7} | 7
(Croatia) B Ćorić | 6^{2} | 5
(Russia) A Rublev | 7 | 5 | 5
5 | (Austria) D Thiem | 5 | 7 | 7

Third round
1 | (Spain) R Nadal | 6 | 6
(Russia) K Khachanov | 3 | 2
9 | (Serbia) N Djokovic | 7^{7} | 2 | 3
5 | (Austria) D Thiem | 6^{2} | 6 | 6

Quarterfinals
1 | (Spain) R Nadal | 6 | 6
5 | (Austria) D Thiem | 0 | 2

==== Section 2 ====
First round
Q | (France) P-H Herbert | 7^{9} | 6
(Italy) P Lorenzi | 6^{7} | 4
(United States) T Sandgren | 2 | 2
(Germany) P Kohlschreiber | 6 | 6
(United States) J Donaldson | 3 | 3
15 | (Spain) A Ramos Viñolas | 6 | 6
11 | (Spain) R Bautista Agut | 6 | 6
(Germany) P Gojowczyk | 4 | 3
(France) B Paire | 7 | 6^{5} | 4
(Spain) F López | 5 | 7^{7} | 6
(Canada) D Shapovalov | 3 | 4
Q | (Greece) S Tsitsipas | 6 | 6

Second round
4 | (Bulgaria) G Dimitrov | 3 | 6 | 6
Q | (France) P-H Herbert | 6 | 2 | 4
(Germany) P Kohlschreiber | 6 | 6
15 | (Spain) A Ramos Viñolas | 4 | 2
11 | (Spain) R Bautista Agut | 6 | 7^{7}
(Spain) F López | 3 | 6^{5}
Q | (Greece) S Tsitsipas | 6^{4} | 5
6 | (Belgium) D Goffin | 7^{7} | 7

Third round
4 | (Bulgaria) G Dimitrov | 4 | 6 | 6
(Germany) P Kohlschreiber | 6 | 3 | 4
11 | (Spain) R Bautista Agut | 4 | 5
6 | (Belgium) D Goffin | 6 | 7

Quarterfinals
4 | (Bulgaria) G Dimitrov | 6 | 7^{7}
6 | (Belgium) D Goffin | 4 | 6^{5}

=== Bottom half ===
==== Section 3 ====
First round
(Germany) M Zverev | 6 | 6^{4} | 6
WC | (Canada) F Auger-Aliassime | 2 | 7^{7} | 1
Q | (France) J Chardy | 4 | 6^{5}
(France) R Gasquet | 6 | 7^{7}
(Argentina) G Pella | 6 | 2 | 3
10 | (Argentina) D Schwartzman | 0 | 6 | 6
13 | (Italy) F Fognini | 6 | 7
Q | (Belarus) I Ivashka | 4 | 5
(Japan) Y Sugita | 3 | 2
(Germany) J-L Struff | 6 | 6
LL | (Germany) F Mayer | 5 | 4
(Luxembourg) G Müller | 7 | 6

Second round
7 | (France) L Pouille | 6 | 1 | 6^{3}
(Germany) M Zverev | 2 | 6 | 7^{7}
(France) R Gasquet | 6 | 6
10 | (Argentina) D Schwartzman | 2 | 1
13 | (Italy) F Fognini | 4 | 2
(Germany) J-L Struff | 6 | 6
(Luxembourg) G Müller | 6 | 3 | 2
3 | (Germany) A Zverev | 4 | 6 | 6

Third round
(Germany) M Zverev | 2 | 5
(France) R Gasquet | 6 | 7
(Germany) J-L Struff | 4 | 6 | 4
3 | (Germany) A Zverev | 6 | 4 | 6

Quarterfinals
(France) R Gasquet | 6 | 2 | 5
3 | (Germany) A Zverev | 4 | 6 | 7

==== Section 4 ====
First round
(United Kingdom) K Edmund | 3 | 7 | 2
Q | (Italy) A Seppi | 6 | 5 | 6
(Hungary) M Fucsovics | 7^{7} | 2 | 5
(Russia) D Medvedev | 6^{4} | 6 | 7
(Japan) K Nishikori | 4 | 6 | 6
12 | (Czech Republic) T Berdych | 6 | 2 | 1
14 | (Canada) M Raonic | 3 | 6 | 6
WC | (Monaco) L Catarina | 6 | 2 | 3
(Bosnia and Herzegovina) D Džumhur | 3 | 2
Q | (Italy) M Cecchinato | 6 | 6
(Spain) F Verdasco | 5 | 7^{7} | 6
(Uruguay) P Cuevas | 7 | 6^{4} | 1

Second round
LL | (Spain) G García López | 6 | 3 | 5
Q | (Italy) A Seppi | 4 | 6 | 7
(Russia) D Medvedev | 5 | 2
(Japan) K Nishikori | 7 | 6
14 | (Canada) M Raonic | 7^{7} | 6
Q | (Italy) M Cecchinato | 6^{5} | 2
(Spain) F Verdasco | 3 | 6^{4}
2 | (Croatia) M Čilić | 6 | 7^{7}

Third round
Q | (Italy) A Seppi | 0 | 6 | 3
(Japan) K Nishikori | 6 | 2 | 6
14 | (Canada) M Raonic
2 | (Croatia) M Čilić | w/o

Quarterfinals
(Japan) K Nishikori | 6 | 6^{1} | 6
2 | (Croatia) M Čilić | 4 | 7^{7} | 3

== Qualifying ==
=== Seeds ===
1. (Italy) Andreas Seppi (qualified)
2. (Spain) Guillermo García López (qualifying competition, lucky loser)
3. (Serbia) Viktor Troicki (first round)
4. (Greece) Stefanos Tsitsipas (qualified)
5. (Germany) Maximilian Marterer (first round)
6. (Germany) Florian Mayer (qualifying competition, lucky loser)
7. (Argentina) Federico Delbonis (first round)
8. (Spain) Roberto Carballés Baena (first round)
9. (France) Pierre-Hugues Herbert (qualified)
10. (France) Jérémy Chardy (qualified)
11. (Uzbekistan) Denis Istomin (first round)
12. (Serbia) Dušan Lajović (qualified)
13. (Kazakhstan) Mikhail Kukushkin (first round)
14. (Bosnia and Herzegovina) Mirza Bašić (qualifying competition, lucky loser)

=== Qualifiers ===
1. (Italy) Andreas Seppi
2. (Italy) Marco Cecchinato
3. (Serbia) Dušan Lajović
4. (Greece) Stefanos Tsitsipas
5. (France) Pierre-Hugues Herbert
6. (Belarus) Ilya Ivashka
7. (France) Jérémy Chardy

=== Lucky losers ===
1. (Germany) Florian Mayer
2. (Bosnia and Herzegovina) Mirza Bašić
3. (Spain) Guillermo García López

=== Qualifying draw ===
==== First qualifier ====
First round
1 | (Italy) Andreas Seppi | 6 | 7
(Australia) Alex de Minaur | 4 | 5
(Spain) Marcel Granollers | 6 | 6
11 | (Uzbekistan) Denis Istomin | 2 | 3

Qualifying competition
1 | (Italy) Andreas Seppi | 6 | 6
(Spain) Marcel Granollers | 3 | 3

==== Second qualifier ====
First round
2 | (Spain) Guillermo García López | 6 | 6
(Italy) Lorenzo Sonego | 4 | 3
(Italy) Marco Cecchinato | 6 | 6
13 | (Kazakhstan) Mikhail Kukushkin | 3 | 4

Qualifying competition
2 | (Spain) Guillermo García López | 4 | 2
(Italy) Marco Cecchinato | 6 | 6

==== Third qualifier ====
First round
3 | (Serbia) Viktor Troicki | 1 | 3
(Ukraine) Sergiy Stakhovsky | 6 | 6
WC | (France) Hugo Nys | 2 | 4
12 | (Serbia) Dušan Lajović | 6 | 6

Qualifying competition
(Ukraine) Sergiy Stakhovsky | 4 | 4
12 | (Serbia) Dušan Lajović | 6 | 6

==== Fourth qualifier ====
First round
4 | (Greece) Stefanos Tsitsipas | 6 | 6
WC | (France) Florent Diep | 3 | 2
WC | (France) Amaury Delmas | 4 | 0
14 | (Bosnia and Herzegovina) Mirza Bašić | 6 | 6

Qualifying competition
4 | (Greece) Stefanos Tsitsipas | 6 | 6
14 | (Bosnia and Herzegovina) Mirza Bašić | 1 | 4

==== Fifth qualifier ====
First round
5 | (Germany) Maximilian Marterer | 1 | 6 | 3
(Slovakia) Andrej Martin | 6 | 3 | 6
(Italy) Stefano Travaglia | 5 | 7^{7} | 6^{4}
9 | (France) Pierre-Hugues Herbert | 7 | 6^{3} | 7^{7}

Qualifying competition
(Slovakia) Andrej Martin | 3 | 3
9 | (France) Pierre-Hugues Herbert | 6 | 6

==== Sixth qualifier ====
First round
6 | (Germany) Florian Mayer | 6 | 7
(Spain) Tommy Robredo | 2 | 5
(Belarus) Ilya Ivashka | 3 | 6 | 6
8 | (Spain) Roberto Carballés Baena | 6 | 4 | 3

Qualifying competition
6 | (Germany) Florian Mayer | 5 | 0
(Belarus) Ilya Ivashka | 7 | 6

==== Seventh qualifier ====
First round
7 | (Argentina) Federico Delbonis | 4 | 3
(France) Nicolas Mahut | 6 | 6
WC | (Monaco) Romain Arneodo | 3 | 2
10 | (France) Jérémy Chardy | 6 | 6

Qualifying competition
(France) Nicolas Mahut | 4 | 1
10 | (France) Jérémy Chardy | 6 | 6
