= 2018 Italian Open – Men's singles =

Men's singles
- 2018 Italian Open

Final
- Champion: (Spain) Rafael Nadal
- Runner-up: (Germany) Alexander Zverev
- Score: 6–1, 1–6, 6–3

Details
- Draw: 56 (7 Q / 4 WC )
- Seeds: 16

Events
Singles	men	women
Doubles	men	women
← 2017 ·	Italian Open	· 2019 →

Rafael Nadal defeated defending champion Alexander Zverev in the final, 6–1, 1–6, 6–3 to win the men's singles tennis title at the 2018 Italian Open. It was his record-extending eighth Italian Open title and his record-extending 32nd Masters 1000 title overall. With the win, Nadal also regained the world No. 1 singles ranking.

After failing to defend his runner-up points from the previous year, Novak Djokovic fell outside the top 20 in rankings for the first time since October 2006.

== Seeds ==
The top eight seeds receive a bye into the second round.

1. (Spain) Rafael Nadal (champion)
2. (Germany) Alexander Zverev (final)
3. (Bulgaria) Grigor Dimitrov (second round)
4. (Croatia) Marin Čilić (semifinals)
5. (Argentina) Juan Martín del Potro (third round, retired)
6. (Austria) Dominic Thiem (second round)
7. (South Africa) Kevin Anderson (second round, retired)
8. (United States) John Isner (second round)

9. (Belgium) David Goffin (quarterfinals)
10. (Spain) Pablo Carreño Busta (quarterfinals)
11. (Serbia) Novak Djokovic (semifinals)
12. (United States) Sam Querrey (first round)
13. (United States) Jack Sock (second round)
14. (Argentina) Diego Schwartzman (second round)
15. (Czech Republic) Tomáš Berdych (first round)
16. (France) Lucas Pouille (second round)

Click on the seed number of a player to go to their draw section.

== Draw ==
=== Key ===
- Q = Qualifier
- WC = Wild card
- LL = Lucky loser
- Alt = Alternate
- ITF = ITF entry
- PR = Protected ranking
- SR = Special ranking
- SE = Special exempt
- JE = Junior exempt
- JR = Junior Accelerator Programme entrant
- CO = College Accelerator Programme entrant
- NG = Next Gen Accelerator Program entrant
- w/o = Walkover
- r = Retired
- d = Defaulted

=== Finals ===
Quarterfinals
1	(Spain) Rafael Nadal	4	6	6
(Italy) Fabio Fognini	6	1	2
(Japan) Kei Nishikori	6	1	3
11	(Serbia) Novak Djokovic	2	6	6
10	(Spain) Pablo Carreño Busta	3	3
4	(Croatia) Marin Čilić	6	6
9	(Belgium) David Goffin	4	6	3
2	(Germany) Alexander Zverev	6	3	6

Semifinals
1	(Spain) Rafael Nadal	7^{7}	6
11	(Serbia) Novak Djokovic	6^{4}	3
4	(Croatia) Marin Čilić	6^{13}	5
2	(Germany) Alexander Zverev	7^{15}	7

Final
1	(Spain) Rafael Nadal	6	1	6
2	(Germany) Alexander Zverev	1	6	3

=== Top half ===
==== Section 1 ====
First round
(Spain) F Verdasco	3	1
(Bosnia and Herzegovina) D Džumhur	6	6
(Russia) D Medvedev	6	4	1
(Netherlands) R Haase	3	6	6
(Canada) D Shapovalov	1	6	7^{7}
15	(Czech Republic) T Berdych	6	3	6^{5}
12	(United States) S Querrey	2	6^{7}
(Germany) P Gojowczyk	6	7^{9}
WC	(Italy) L Sonego	2	7^{7}	6
(France) A Mannarino	6	6^{4}	3
(Italy) F Fognini	6	6
(France) G Monfils	3	1

Second round
1	(Spain) R Nadal	6	6
(Bosnia and Herzegovina) D Džumhur	1	0
(Netherlands) R Haase	6^{3}	7^{7}	3
(Canada) D Shapovalov	7^{7}	6^{5}	6
(Germany) P Gojowczyk	6	6
WC	(Italy) L Sonego	3	4
(Italy) F Fognini	6	1	6
6	(Austria) D Thiem	4	6	3

Third round
1	(Spain) R Nadal	6	6
(Canada) D Shapovalov	4	1
(Germany) P Gojowczyk	4	4
(Italy) F Fognini	6	6

Quarterfinals
1	(Spain) R Nadal	4	6	6
(Italy) F Fognini	6	1	2

==== Section 2 ====
First round
(Japan) K Nishikori	7^{7}	6
(Spain) F López	6^{5}	4
(Russia) K Khachanov	5	7^{9}	6^{6}
(Germany) P Kohlschreiber	7	6^{7}	7^{8}
(Spain) D Ferrer	3	4
13	(United States) J Sock	6	6
11	(Serbia) N Djokovic	6	6
(Ukraine) A Dolgopolov	1	3
Q	(Georgia (country)) N Basilashvili	6	4	6
Q	(Italy) F Baldi	4	6	4
Q	(Argentina) F Delbonis	6	5	1
(Spain) A Ramos Viñolas	2	7	6

Second round
3	(Bulgaria) G Dimitrov	7^{7}	5	4
(Japan) K Nishikori	6^{4}	7	6
(Germany) P Kohlschreiber	6	6
13	(United States) J Sock	4	3
11	(Serbia) N Djokovic	6	6
Q	(Georgia (country)) N Basilashvili	4	2
(Spain) A Ramos Viñolas	6^{5}	7^{7}	7^{7}
8	(United States) J Isner	7^{7}	6^{2}	6^{5}

Third round
(Japan) K Nishikori	6	6
(Germany) P Kohlschreiber	1	2
11	(Serbia) N Djokovic	6	7
(Spain) A Ramos Viñolas	1	5

Quarterfinals
(Japan) K Nishikori	6	1	3
11	(Serbia) N Djokovic	2	6	6

=== Bottom half ===
==== Section 3 ====
First round
(Slovenia) A Bedene	6	6
(Luxembourg) G Müller	4	4
(Switzerland) S Wawrinka	4	4
(United States) S Johnson	6	6
(United States) J Donaldson	4	6	0
10	(Spain) P Carreño Busta	6	3	6
14	(Argentina) D Schwartzman	6	6
Q	(Chile) N Jarry	4	1
(France) B Paire	6	6
(France) R Gasquet	4	4
(United States) R Harrison	7^{7}	6
(Japan) Y Sugita	6^{5}	3

Second round
7	(South Africa) K Anderson	4	0^{r}
(Slovenia) A Bedene	6	0
(United States) S Johnson	4	6	4
10	(Spain) P Carreño Busta	6	2	6
14	(Argentina) D Schwartzman	6	4	2
(France) B Paire	2	6	6
(United States) R Harrison	7^{7}	1	6^{1}
4	(Croatia) M Čilić	6^{3}	6	7^{7}

Third round
(Slovenia) A Bedene	4	7^{7}	2
10	(Spain) P Carreño Busta	6	6^{3}	6
(France) B Paire	3	4
4	(Croatia) M Čilić	6	6

Quarterfinals
10	(Spain) P Carreño Busta	3	3
4	(Croatia) M Čilić	6	6

==== Section 4 ====
First round
(Croatia) B Ćorić	1^{r}
Q	(Greece) S Tsitsipas	4
(Uruguay) P Cuevas	6	5	4
WC	(Italy) M Cecchinato	2	7	6
(Argentina) L Mayer	1	2
9	(Belgium) D Goffin	6	6
16	(France) L Pouille	6	3	7^{7}
WC	(Italy) A Seppi	2	6	6^{3}
Q	(Tunisia) M Jaziri	3	6	3
(United Kingdom) K Edmund	6	3	6
WC	(Italy) M Berrettini	6	7^{7}
Q	(United States) F Tiafoe	3	6^{1}

Second round
5	(Argentina) JM del Potro	7	6
Q	(Greece) S Tsitsipas	5	3
WC	(Italy) M Cecchinato	7	2	2
9	(Belgium) D Goffin	5	6	6
16	(France) L Pouille	2	6^{3}
(United Kingdom) K Edmund	6	7^{7}
WC	(Italy) M Berrettini	5	2
2	(Germany) A Zverev	7	6

Third round
5	(Argentina) JM del Potro	2	5^{r}
9	(Belgium) D Goffin	6	4
(United Kingdom) K Edmund	5	6^{11}
2	(Germany) A Zverev	7	7^{13}

Quarterfinals
9	(Belgium) D Goffin	4	6	3
2	(Germany) A Zverev	6	3	6

== Qualifying ==
=== Seeds ===
1. (Greece) Stefanos Tsitsipas (qualified)
2. (Portugal) João Sousa (qualifying competition)
3. (Germany) Mischa Zverev (qualifying competition)
4. (United States) Frances Tiafoe (qualified)
5. (France) Julien Benneteau (qualifying competition)
6. (Hungary) Márton Fucsovics (first round)
7. (Tunisia) Malek Jaziri (qualified)
8. (Chile) Nicolás Jarry (qualified)
9. (United States) Taylor Fritz (first round)
10. (Spain) Guillermo García López (qualifying competition)
11. (Germany) Florian Mayer (first round)
12. (Georgia (country)) Nikoloz Basilashvili (qualified)
13. (Argentina) Federico Delbonis (qualified)
14. (Serbia) Viktor Troicki (qualifying competition, withdrew)

=== Qualifiers ===
1. (Greece) Stefanos Tsitsipas
2. (Chile) Nicolás Jarry
3. (Argentina) Federico Delbonis
4. (United States) Frances Tiafoe
5. (Georgia (country)) Nikoloz Basilashvili
6. (Italy) Filippo Baldi
7. (Tunisia) Malek Jaziri

=== Qualifying draw ===
==== First qualifier ====
First round
1	(Greece) Stefanos Tsitsipas	5	6	7^{7}
(Kazakhstan) Mikhail Kukushkin	7	3	6^{5}
(Serbia) Dušan Lajović	7	3	6
11	(Germany) Florian Mayer	5	6	2

Qualifying competition
1	(Greece) Stefanos Tsitsipas	7^{11}	6
(Serbia) Dušan Lajović	6^{9}	4

==== Second qualifier ====
First round
2	(Portugal) João Sousa	6	6
(Argentina) Horacio Zeballos	4	0
(Argentina) Nicolás Kicker	7^{7}	5	6^{7}
8	(Chile) Nicolás Jarry	6^{3}	7	7^{9}

Qualifying competition
2	(Portugal) João Sousa	4	3
8	(Chile) Nicolás Jarry	6	6

==== Third qualifier ====
First round
3	(Germany) Mischa Zverev	6	6
WC	(Italy) Andrea Pellegrino	1	2
(United Kingdom) Cameron Norrie	2	0
13	(Argentina) Federico Delbonis	6	6

Qualifying competition
3	(Germany) Mischa Zverev	6	3	4
13	(Argentina) Federico Delbonis	3	6	6

==== Fourth qualifier ====
First round
4	(United States) Frances Tiafoe	3	7	6
WC	(Italy) Salvatore Caruso	6	5	4
(Italy) Thomas Fabbiano	5	3
14	(Serbia) Viktor Troicki	7	6

Qualifying competition
4	(United States) Frances Tiafoe	w/o
14	(Serbia) Viktor Troicki

==== Fifth qualifier ====
First round
5	(France) Julien Benneteau	6	6
WC	(Italy) Liam Caruana	2	0
(Romania) Marius Copil	4	6	2
12	(Georgia (country)) Nikoloz Basilashvili	6	3	6

Qualifying competition
5	(France) Julien Benneteau	6	5	4
12	(Georgia (country)) Nikoloz Basilashvili	3	7	6

==== Sixth qualifier ====
First round
6	(Hungary) Márton Fucsovics	6^{4}	7^{7}	5
WC	(Italy) Filippo Baldi	7^{7}	6^{5}	7
(Belgium) Ruben Bemelmans	3	1
10	(Spain) Guillermo García López	6	6

Qualifying competition
WC	(Italy) Filippo Baldi	4	6	7^{7}
10	(Spain) Guillermo García López	6	4	6^{5}

==== Seventh qualifier ====
First round
7	(Tunisia) Malek Jaziri	6	6
(Russia) Evgeny Donskoy	3	2
(Russia) Mikhail Youzhny	6	3	6
9	(United States) Taylor Fritz	4	6	4

Qualifying competition
7	(Tunisia) Malek Jaziri	6	3	6
(Russia) Mikhail Youzhny	4	6	3
