= 2018 Monte-Carlo Masters =

Tennis tournament

- Date: April 15 – 22
- Edition: 112th
- Category: Masters 1000
- Draw: 56S / 24D
- Prize money: €4,273,775
- Surface: Clay
- Location: Roquebrune-Cap-Martin, France (billed as Monte Carlo, Monaco)
- Venue: Monte Carlo Country Club

Champions

Singles
- (Spain) Rafael Nadal

Doubles
- (United States) Bob Bryan / (United States) Mike Bryan
← 2017 ·	Monte-Carlo Masters	· 2019 →

The 2018 Monte-Carlo Masters (also known as the Rolex Monte-Carlo Masters for sponsorship reasons) was a tennis tournament for male professional players that was played on outdoor clay courts. It was the 112th edition of the annual Monte Carlo Masters tournament, sponsored by Rolex for the tenth time. It took place at the Monte Carlo Country Club in Roquebrune-Cap-Martin, France (though billed as Monte Carlo, Monaco).

== Points ==
Because the Monte Carlo Masters is the non-mandatory Masters 1000 event, special rules regarding points distribution are in place. The Monte Carlo Masters counts as one of a player's 500 level tournaments, while distributing Masters 1000 points.

Event	W	F	SF	QF	Round of 16	Round of 32	Round of 64	Q	Q2	Q1
Men's singles	1,000	600	360	180	90	45	10	25	16	0
Men's doubles	1,000	600	360	180	90	0	—	—	—	—

== Singles main-draw entrants ==
=== Seeds ===
Country	Player	Rank^{1}	Seed
ESP	Rafael Nadal	1	1
CRO	Marin Čilić	3	2
GER	Alexander Zverev	4	3
BUL	Grigor Dimitrov	5	4
AUT	Dominic Thiem	7	5
BEL	David Goffin	10	6
FRA	Lucas Pouille	11	7
~~ESP~~	~~Pablo Carreño Busta~~	~~12~~	~~8~~
SRB	Novak Djokovic	13	9
ARG	Diego Schwartzman	15	10
ESP	Roberto Bautista Agut	17	11
CZE	Tomáš Berdych	18	12
ITA	Fabio Fognini	20	13
CAN	Milos Raonic	22	14
ESP	Albert Ramos Viñolas	23	15
FRA	Adrian Mannarino	25	16

- Rankings are as of April 9, 2018.

=== Other entrants ===
The following players received wildcards into the main draw:

- (Canada) Félix Auger-Aliassime
- (Monaco) Lucas Catarina
- (Australia) Thanasi Kokkinakis
- (France) Gilles Simon

The following players received entry via the qualifying draw:

- (Italy) Marco Cecchinato
- (France) Jérémy Chardy
- (France) Pierre-Hugues Herbert
- (Belarus) Ilya Ivashka
- (Serbia) Dušan Lajović
- (Italy) Andreas Seppi
- (Greece) Stefanos Tsitsipas

The following players received entry as lucky losers:

- (Bosnia and Herzegovina) Mirza Bašić
- (Germany) Florian Mayer
- (Spain) Guillermo García López

=== Withdrawals ===
Before the tournament

- (Spain) Pablo Carreño Busta → replaced by (Spain) Guillermo García López
- (Ukraine) Aleksandr Dolgopolov → replaced by (Bosnia and Herzegovina) Mirza Bašić
- (Spain) David Ferrer → replaced by (Argentina) Guido Pella
- (Serbia) Filip Krajinović → replaced by (Germany) Florian Mayer
- (Argentina) Leonardo Mayer → replaced by (Hungary) Márton Fucsovics
- (France) Gaël Monfils → replaced by (France) Julien Benneteau
- (France) Jo-Wilfried Tsonga → replaced by (United States) Tennys Sandgren

During the tournament

- (Canada) Milos Raonic

== Doubles main-draw entrants ==
=== Seeds ===
Country	Player	Country	Player	Rank^{1}	Seed
POL	Łukasz Kubot	BRA	Marcelo Melo	2	1
FIN	Henri Kontinen	AUS	John Peers	9	2
AUT	Oliver Marach	CRO	Mate Pavić	9	3
USA	Bob Bryan	USA	Mike Bryan	14	4
FRA	Pierre-Hugues Herbert	FRA	Nicolas Mahut	22	5
~~NED~~	~~Jean-Julien Rojer~~	~~ROU~~	~~Horia Tecău~~	~~23~~	~~6~~
GBR	Jamie Murray	BRA	Bruno Soares	29	7
CRO	Ivan Dodig	USA	Rajeev Ram	37	8

- Rankings are as of April 9, 2018.

=== Other entrants ===
The following pairs received wildcards into the doubles main draw:

- (Monaco) Romain Arneodo / (France) Hugo Nys
- (Italy) Simone Bolelli / (Italy) Fabio Fognini

The following pairs received entry as alternates:

- (United States) James Cerretani / (Italy) Andreas Seppi
- (Bosnia and Herzegovina) Damir Džumhur / (Pakistan) Aisam-ul-Haq Qureshi

=== Withdrawals ===
Before the tournament

- (Serbia) Filip Krajinović
- (Canada) Milos Raonic
- (Romania) Horia Tecău
- (Spain) Fernando Verdasco

During the tournament

- (Bulgaria) Grigor Dimitrov

== Champions ==
=== Singles ===
- (Spain) Rafael Nadal def. (Japan) Kei Nishikori, 6–3, 6–2

=== Doubles ===
- (United States) Bob Bryan / (United States) Mike Bryan def. (Austria) Oliver Marach / (Croatia) Mate Pavić, 7–6^{(7–5)}, 6–3.
