= 2018 Italian Open (tennis) =

- Date: 14–20 May
- Edition: 75th
- Draw: 56S / 24D (men); 56S / 28D (women)
- Prize money: €4,872,105 (men) $3,351,720 (women)
- Surface: Clay / outdoor
- Location: Rome, Italy
- Venue: Foro Italico

Champions

Men's singles
- (Spain) Rafael Nadal

Women's singles
- (Ukraine) Elina Svitolina

Men's doubles
- (Colombia) Juan Sebastián Cabal / (Colombia) Robert Farah

Women's doubles
- (Australia) Ashleigh Barty / (Netherlands) Demi Schuurs
← 2017 ·	Italian Open	· 2019 →

The 2018 Italian Open (also known as the 2018 Rome Masters and sponsored title 2018 Internazionali BNL d'Italia) was a professional tennis tournament played on outdoor clay courts at the Foro Italico in Rome, Italy from 14 to 20 May 2018. It was the 75th edition of the Italian Open and it is classified as an ATP World Tour Masters 1000 event on the 2018 ATP World Tour and a Premier 5 event on the 2018 WTA Tour.

== Finals ==
=== Men's singles ===
- (Spain) Rafael Nadal defeated (Germany) Alexander Zverev, 6–1, 1–6, 6–3

=== Women's singles ===
- (Ukraine) Elina Svitolina defeated (Romania) Simona Halep, 6–0, 6–4

=== Men's doubles ===
- (Colombia) Juan Sebastián Cabal / (Colombia) Robert Farah defeated (Spain) Pablo Carreño Busta / (Portugal) João Sousa, 3–6, 6–4, [10–4]

=== Women's doubles ===
- (Australia) Ashleigh Barty / (Netherlands) Demi Schuurs defeated (Czech Republic) Andrea Sestini Hlaváčková / (Czech Republic) Barbora Strýcová, 6–3, 6–4

== Points and prize money ==
=== Point distribution ===
Event	W	F	SF	QF	Round of 16	Round of 32	Round of 64	Q	Q2	Q1
Men's singles	1000	600	360	180	90	45	10	25	16	0
Men's doubles	1000	600	360	180	90	10	—	—	—	—
Women's singles	900	585	350	190	105	60	1	30	20	1
Women's doubles	900	585	350	190	105	1	—	—	—	—

=== Prize money ===
Event	W	F	SF	QF	Round of 16	Round of 32	Round of 64	Q2	Q1
Men's singles	€935,385	€458,640	€230,830	€117,375	€60,945	€32,135	€17,350	€4,000	€2,040
Women's singles	€507,100	€253,425	€126,590	€58,313	€28,910	€14,840	€7,627	€4,245	€2,184
Men's doubles	€289,670	€141,820	€71,130	€35,510	€18,870	€9,960	—	—	—
Women's doubles	€145,167	€73,322	€36,293	€18,269	€9,227	€4,572	—	—	—

== ATP singles main-draw entrants ==
=== Seeds ===
The following are the seeded players. Seedings are based on ATP rankings as of 7 May 2018. Rankings and points before are as of 14 May 2018.

Seed	Rank	Player	Points before	Points defending	Points won	Points after	Status
1	2	(Spain) Rafael Nadal	7,950	180	1000	8,770	Champion, defeated (Germany) Alexander Zverev [2]
2	3	(Germany) Alexander Zverev	6,015	1,000	600	5,615	Runner-up, lost to (Spain) Rafael Nadal [1]
3	4	(Bulgaria) Grigor Dimitrov	4,870	10	10	4,870	Second round lost to (Japan) Kei Nishikori
4	5	(Croatia) Marin Čilić	4,770	180	360	4,950	Semifinals lost to (Germany) Alexander Zverev [2]
5	6	(Argentina) Juan Martín del Potro	4,540	180	90	4,450	Third round retired against (Belgium) David Goffin [9]
6	8	(Austria) Dominic Thiem	3,545	360	10	3,195	Second round lost to (Italy) Fabio Fognini
7	7	(South Africa) Kevin Anderson	3,660	35	10	3,635	Second round retired against (Slovenia) Aljaž Bedene
8	9	(United States) John Isner	3,305	360	10	2,955	Second round lost to (Spain) Albert Ramos Viñolas
9	10	(Belgium) David Goffin	2,930	90	180	3,020	Quarterfinals lost to (Germany) Alexander Zverev
10	11	(Spain) Pablo Carreño Busta	2,280	45	180	2,415	Quarterfinals lost to (Croatia) Marin Čilić [4]
11	18	(Serbia) Novak Djokovic	1,905	600	360	1,665	Semifinals lost to (Spain) Rafael Nadal [1]
12	12	(United States) Sam Querrey	2,220	90	10	2,140	First round lost to (Germany) Peter Gojowczyk
13	14	(United States) Jack Sock	2,155	90	45	2,110	Second round lost to (Germany) Philipp Kohlschreiber
14	15	(Argentina) Diego Schwartzman	2,130	10	45	2,165	Second round lost to (France) Benoît Paire
15	17	(Czech Republic) Tomáš Berdych	1,980	90	10	1,900	First round lost to (Canada) Denis Shapovalov
16	16	(France) Lucas Pouille	1,995	10	45	2,030	Second round lost to (United Kingdom) Kyle Edmund

The following players would have been seeded, but they withdrew from the event.

Rank	Player	Points before	Points defending	Points after	Reason
1	(Switzerland) Roger Federer	9,670	0	8,670	Scheduling
13	(Spain) Roberto Bautista Agut	2,210	10	2,120	Personal

=== Other entrants ===
The following players received wildcards into the main draw:

- (Italy) Matteo Berrettini
- (Italy) Marco Cecchinato
- (Italy) Andreas Seppi
- (Italy) Lorenzo Sonego

The following players received entry from the qualifying draw:

- (Italy) Filippo Baldi
- (Georgia (country)) Nikoloz Basilashvili
- (Argentina) Federico Delbonis
- (Chile) Nicolás Jarry
- (Tunisia) Malek Jaziri
- (United States) Frances Tiafoe
- (Greece) Stefanos Tsitsipas

=== Withdrawals ===
Before the tournament

- (Spain) Roberto Bautista Agut → replaced by (United States) Steve Johnson
- (South Korea) Hyeon Chung → replaced by (Ukraine) Alexandr Dolgopolov
- (Switzerland) Roger Federer → replaced by (Canada) Denis Shapovalov
- (Serbia) Filip Krajinović → replaced by (Slovenia) Aljaž Bedene
- (Australia) Nick Kyrgios → replaced by (United States) Ryan Harrison
- (United Kingdom) Andy Murray → replaced by (Argentina) Leonardo Mayer
- (Canada) Milos Raonic → replaced by (Germany) Peter Gojowczyk
- (Russia) Andrey Rublev → replaced by (Russia) Daniil Medvedev
- (France) Jo-Wilfried Tsonga → replaced by (France) Benoît Paire

== ATP doubles main-draw entrants ==
=== Seeds ===
Country	Player	Country	Player	Rank^{1}	Seed
POL	Łukasz Kubot	BRA	Marcelo Melo	3	1
AUT	Oliver Marach	CRO	Mate Pavić	7	2
~~USA~~	~~Bob Bryan~~	~~USA~~	~~Mike Bryan~~	~~10~~	~~3~~
FIN	Henri Kontinen	AUS	John Peers	15	4
GBR	Jamie Murray	BRA	Bruno Soares	27	5
COL	Juan Sebastián Cabal	COL	Robert Farah	37	6
IND	Rohan Bopanna	FRA	Édouard Roger-Vasselin	44	7
ESP	Feliciano López	ESP	Marc López	46	8

- Rankings are as of May 7, 2018.

=== Other entrants ===
The following pairs received wildcards into the doubles main draw:

- (Italy) Simone Bolelli / (Italy) Fabio Fognini
- (Italy) Julian Ocleppo / (Italy) Andrea Vavassori

The following pair received entry as alternates:

- (Spain) Pablo Carreño Busta / (Portugal) João Sousa

=== Withdrawals ===
Before the tournament

- (United States) Bob Bryan

== WTA singles main-draw entrants ==
=== Seeds ===
Country	Player	Rank^{1}	Seed
ROU	Simona Halep	1	1
DEN	Caroline Wozniacki	2	2
ESP	Garbiñe Muguruza	3	3
UKR	Elina Svitolina	4	4
LAT	Jeļena Ostapenko	5	5
CZE	Karolína Plíšková	6	6
FRA	Caroline Garcia	7	7
USA	Venus Williams	8	8
USA	Sloane Stephens	9	9
~~CZE~~	~~Petra Kvitová~~	~~10~~	~~10~~
GER	Angelique Kerber	11	11
USA	CoCo Vandeweghe	13	12
USA	Madison Keys	14	13
RUS	Daria Kasatkina	15	14
LAT	Anastasija Sevastova	17	15
AUS	Ashleigh Barty	18	16
SVK	Magdaléna Rybáriková	19	17

- Rankings are as of 7 May 2018.

=== Other entrants ===
The following players received wildcards into the main draw:

- (Italy) Sara Errani
- (Italy) Camilla Rosatello
- (Italy) Francesca Schiavone
- (Australia) Samantha Stosur
- (Italy) Roberta Vinci

The following players received entry using a protected ranking:

- (Belarus) Victoria Azarenka
- (Germany) Laura Siegemund

The following players received entry from the qualifying draw:

- (United States) Danielle Collins
- (Slovenia) Polona Hercog
- (Chinese Taipei) Hsieh Su-wei
- (Estonia) Kaia Kanepi
- (Australia) Ajla Tomljanović
- (Belgium) Alison Van Uytvanck
- (Croatia) Donna Vekić
- (Russia) Natalia Vikhlyantseva

The following players received entry as lucky losers:

- (Kazakhstan) Zarina Diyas
- (Serbia) Aleksandra Krunić
- (Belarus) Aryna Sabalenka

=== Withdrawals ===
Before the tournament

- (France) Alizé Cornet → replaced by (Russia) Elena Vesnina
- (Germany) Julia Görges → replaced by (Hungary) Tímea Babos
- (Czech Republic) Petra Kvitová → replaced by (Serbia) Aleksandra Krunić
- (Russia) Ekaterina Makarova → replaced by (Belarus) Aryna Sabalenka
- (Belgium) Elise Mertens → replaced by (Greece) Maria Sakkari
- (United States) Serena Williams → replaced by (Kazakhstan) Zarina Diyas

During the tournament

- (United States) Madison Keys

== WTA doubles main-draw entrants ==
=== Seeds ===
Country	Player	Country	Player	Rank^{1}	Seed
~~RUS~~	~~Ekaterina Makarova~~	~~RUS~~	~~Elena Vesnina~~	~~4~~	~~1~~
CZE	Andrea Sestini Hlaváčková	CZE	Barbora Strýcová	17	2
HUN	Tímea Babos	FRA	Kristina Mladenovic	18	3
CAN	Gabriela Dabrowski	CHN	Xu Yifan	25	4
TPE	Latisha Chan	USA	Bethanie Mattek-Sands	32	5
CZE	Barbora Krejčíková	CZE	Kateřina Siniaková	33	6
SLO	Andreja Klepač	ESP	María José Martínez Sánchez	34	7
AUS	Ashleigh Barty	NED	Demi Schuurs	35	8

- Rankings are as of May 7, 2018.

=== Other entrants ===
The following pairs received wildcards into the doubles main draw:

- (Italy) Deborah Chiesa / (Italy) Alice Matteucci
- (Italy) Sara Errani / (Italy) Martina Trevisan
- (Ukraine) Olga Savchuk / (Ukraine) Elina Svitolina

The following pair received entry as alternates:

- (United Kingdom) Johanna Konta / (China) Zhang Shuai

=== Withdrawals ===
Before the tournament

- (Russia) Ekaterina Makarova

During the tournament

- (United States) Madison Keys
