= 2017 Andy Murray tennis season =

- Full name: Andy Murray
- Country: United Kingdom
- Calendar prize money: $2,092,625

Singles
- Season record: 25–10
- Calendar titles: 1
- Year-end ranking: No. 16
- Ranking change from previous year: ▼15

Grand Slam & significant results
- Australian Open: 4R
- French Open: SF
- Wimbledon: QF
- US Open: A

Doubles
- Season record: 1–3
- Calendar titles: 0
- Year-end ranking: No. 543
- Ranking change from previous year: ▼199
- Last updated on: 11 December 2017.

Andy Murray's 2017 tennis season officially began at the Qatar Open.

== Year summary ==
=== Australian Open and early hard court season ===
==== Exhibitions and Qatar Open ====
Prior to the Qatar Open, Murray played in the exhibition Mubadala World Tennis Championship, where he lost in the semi-finals to David Goffin before beating Milos Raonic in the third-place play-off. This event occurred prior to the 2017 season (December 29–31st)

Murray competed at the Qatar Open for the first time since 2014, when he lost in the second round. He competed in the tournament as the top seed, entering the tournament on a 24-match win streak. He extended that streak with a first round win against Jérémy Chardy, a second round win against Gerald Melzer, and a quarterfinal win against Nicolás Almagro. In the semi-final he beat Tomáš Berdych (Murray's hundredth career win against a top ten opponent) in straight sets. Murray lost in the final against Novak Djokovic in three sets, to make their head-to-head record 25–11 in favor of Djokovic. Murray saved three championship points in the second set, but was not able to win the decider.

==== Australian Open ====
Murray entered the Australian Open as the top seed, and began his campaign for a first title in Melbourne with straight-set wins over Illya Marchenko, Andrey Rublev, and Sam Querrey. Murray was then stunned by Mischa Zverev in four sets. Throughout the match, Zverev used aggressive tactics and a serve-and-volley style of play to bamboozle Murray.

==== Dubai Tennis Championships ====
Murray's next tournament was the Dubai Open. After straight-set wins over Malek Jaziri and Guillermo García López, Murray won a thrilling three-set match against Phillipp Kohlschreiber, saving seven match points in a second-set tiebreak he eventually won 20–18. Murray followed this up with a victory against Lucas Pouille to reach the final, where he beat Fernando Verdasco in straight sets to win a first Dubai title.

==== Indian Wells Masters ====
Upon entering Indian Wells, Murray was stunned by world No. 129 Vasek Pospisil in straight sets.

=== European clay court season and French Open ===
==== Monte-Carlo Masters ====
After missing a month due to an elbow injury, Murray competed in the Monte-Carlo Masters where he received a bye in the first round before defeating Gilles Müller in straight sets. Murray was then upset by world No. 24 Albert Ramos Viñolas in the next round despite having a 4–0 lead in the third set.

==== Barcelona Open ====
In the Barcelona Open, Murray advanced to the quarterfinals after a walkover over Bernard Tomic and a straight sets victory over Feliciano López. He then defeated Albert Ramos Viñolas in three sets, rebounding from his defeat in the Monte-Carlo Masters, but lost in the semifinals to Dominic Thiem in three sets.

==== Madrid Open ====
Murray then competed at the Madrid Open where he defeated Marius Copil in straight sets in the second round but lost in the third round to Borna Ćorić in straight sets.

==== Italian Open ====
Murray was the defending champion at the Italian Open however his title defense ended in a straight sets defeat against Fabio Fognini.

==== French Open ====
In the French Open, Murray defeated Andrey Kuznetsov and Martin Kližan in four sets before defeating Juan Martín del Potro and Karen Khachanov in straight sets to reach the quarterfinals. He then defeated Kei Nishikori in four sets to reach the semifinals where he lost to eventual finalist Stan Wawrinka in five sets.

=== Grass Court Season ===
==== Queen's Club Championships ====
Murray then played at the Queen's Club Championships where he was the two-time defending champion, however he lost in the first round to Jordan Thompson in straight sets.

==== Wimbledon Championships ====
Murray then entered the Wimbledon Championships as the defending champion, despite sustaining a lingering hip injury beforehand. He defeated Alexander Bublik and Dustin Brown in straight sets to reach the third round. He then defeated Fabio Fognini in four sets and Benoît Paire in straight sets to progress into the quarterfinals. He then lost to Sam Querrey in five sets.

=== Hip injury and end of Season ===
The loss to Sam Querrey in the Wimbledon quarterfinals officially ended Murray's 2017 tennis season as Murray was forced to withdraw from all the following tournaments as a result of his hip injury, despite attempting to participate at the US Open. As a result, he did not qualify for the ATP Finals and his world ranking fell to World No. 16, his lowest ranking since May 2008. Despite not playing in an official tournament again in 2017, he returned to the court to play a charity match against Roger Federer in Glasgow.

== All matches ==
This table chronicles all the matches of Andy Murray in 2017, including walkovers (W/O) which the ATP does not count as wins. They are marked ND for non-decision or no decision.

Key
W	F	SF	QF	#R	RR	Q#	P#	DNQ	A	Z#	PO	G	S	B	NMS	NTI	P	NH

(W) winner; (F) finalist; (SF) semifinalist; (QF) quarterfinalist; (#R) rounds 4, 3, 2, 1; (RR) round-robin stage; (Q#) qualification round; (P#) preliminary round; (DNQ) did not qualify; (A) absent; (Z#) Davis/Fed Cup Zonal Group (with number indication) or (PO) play-off; (G) gold, (S) silver or (B) bronze Olympic/Paralympic medal; (NMS) not a Masters tournament; (NTI) not a Tier I tournament; (P) postponed; (NH) not held; (SR) strike rate (events won / competed); (W–L) win–loss record.
To avoid confusion and double counting, these charts are updated at the conclusion of a tournament or when the player's participation has ended.

=== Singles ===
Tournament	Match	Round	Opponent (seed or key)	Rank	Result	Score
Qatar Open; Doha, Qatar; ATP 250; Hard, outdoor 2–7 January 2017
Qatar Open; Doha, Qatar; ATP 250; Hard, outdoor 2–7 January 2017	1 / 805	1R	(France) Jérémy Chardy	69	Win	6–0, 7–6^{(7–2)}
Qatar Open; Doha, Qatar; ATP 250; Hard, outdoor 2–7 January 2017	2 / 806	2R	(Austria) Gerald Melzer	68	Win	7–6^{(8–6)}, 7–5
Qatar Open; Doha, Qatar; ATP 250; Hard, outdoor 2–7 January 2017	3 / 807	QF	(Spain) Nicolás Almagro	44	Win	7–6^{(7–4)}, 7–5
Qatar Open; Doha, Qatar; ATP 250; Hard, outdoor 2–7 January 2017	4 / 808	SF	(Czech Republic) Tomáš Berdych (3)	10	Win	6–3, 6–4
Qatar Open; Doha, Qatar; ATP 250; Hard, outdoor 2–7 January 2017	5 / 809	F	(Serbia) Novak Djokovic (2)	2	Loss (1)	3–6, 7–5, 4–6
Australian Open; Melbourne, Australia; Grand Slam tournament Hard, outdoor 16–29 January 2017
Australian Open; Melbourne, Australia; Grand Slam tournament Hard, outdoor 16–29 January 2017	6 / 810	1R	(Ukraine) Illya Marchenko	95	Win	7–5, 7–6^{(7–5)}, 6–2
Australian Open; Melbourne, Australia; Grand Slam tournament Hard, outdoor 16–29 January 2017	7 / 811	2R	(Russia) Andrey Rublev (Q)	152	Win	6–3, 6–0, 6–2
Australian Open; Melbourne, Australia; Grand Slam tournament Hard, outdoor 16–29 January 2017	8 / 812	3R	(United States) Sam Querrey (31)	32	Win	6–4, 6–2, 6–4
Australian Open; Melbourne, Australia; Grand Slam tournament Hard, outdoor 16–29 January 2017	9 / 813	4R	(Germany) Mischa Zverev	50	Loss	5–7, 7–5, 2–6, 4–6
Dubai Tennis Championships; Dubai, United Arab Emirates; ATP 500; Hard, outdoor 25 February – 5 March 2017
Dubai Tennis Championships; Dubai, United Arab Emirates; ATP 500; Hard, outdoor 25 February – 5 March 2017	10 / 814	1R	(Tunisia) Malek Jaziri	51	Win	6–4, 6–1
Dubai Tennis Championships; Dubai, United Arab Emirates; ATP 500; Hard, outdoor 25 February – 5 March 2017	11 / 815	2R	(Spain) Guillermo García López	97	Win	6–2, 6–0
Dubai Tennis Championships; Dubai, United Arab Emirates; ATP 500; Hard, outdoor 25 February – 5 March 2017	12 / 816	QF	(Germany) Philipp Kohlschreiber	29	Win	6–7^{(4–7)}, 7–6^{(20–18)}, 6–1
Dubai Tennis Championships; Dubai, United Arab Emirates; ATP 500; Hard, outdoor 25 February – 5 March 2017	13 / 817	SF	(France) Lucas Pouille (7)	15	Win	7–5, 6–1
Dubai Tennis Championships; Dubai, United Arab Emirates; ATP 500; Hard, outdoor 25 February – 5 March 2017	14 / 818	W	(Spain) Fernando Verdasco	35	Win (1)	6–3, 6–2
Indian Wells Masters; Indian Wells, United States; ATP 1000; Hard, outdoor 6–19 March 2017
Indian Wells Masters; Indian Wells, United States; ATP 1000; Hard, outdoor 6–19 March 2017	–	1R	Bye			
Indian Wells Masters; Indian Wells, United States; ATP 1000; Hard, outdoor 6–19 March 2017	15 / 819	2R	(Canada) Vasek Pospisil (Q)	129	Loss	4–6, 6–7^{(5–7)}
Monte-Carlo Masters; Monte Carlo, Monaco; ATP 1000; Clay, outdoor 17–23 April 2017
Monte-Carlo Masters; Monte Carlo, Monaco; ATP 1000; Clay, outdoor 17–23 April 2017	–	1R	Bye			
Monte-Carlo Masters; Monte Carlo, Monaco; ATP 1000; Clay, outdoor 17–23 April 2017	16 / 820	2R	(Luxembourg) Gilles Müller	28	Win	7–5, 7–5
Monte-Carlo Masters; Monte Carlo, Monaco; ATP 1000; Clay, outdoor 17–23 April 2017	17 / 821	3R	(Spain) Albert Ramos Viñolas (15)	24	Loss	6–2, 2–6, 5–7
Barcelona Open; Barcelona, Spain; ATP 500; Clay, outdoor 24–30 April 2017
Barcelona Open; Barcelona, Spain; ATP 500; Clay, outdoor 24–30 April 2017	–	1R	Bye			
Barcelona Open; Barcelona, Spain; ATP 500; Clay, outdoor 24–30 April 2017	–	2R	(Australia) Bernard Tomic	41	Walkover	N/A
Barcelona Open; Barcelona, Spain; ATP 500; Clay, outdoor 24–30 April 2017	18 / 822	3R	(Spain) Feliciano López (16)	40	Win	6–4, 6–4
Barcelona Open; Barcelona, Spain; ATP 500; Clay, outdoor 24–30 April 2017	19 / 823	QF	(Spain) Albert Ramos Viñolas (10)	19	Win	2–6, 6–4, 7–6^{(7–4)}
Barcelona Open; Barcelona, Spain; ATP 500; Clay, outdoor 24–30 April 2017	20 / 824	SF	(Austria) Dominic Thiem (4)	9	Loss	2–6, 6–3, 4–6
Madrid Open; Madrid, Spain; ATP 1000; Clay, outdoor 5–14 May 2017
Madrid Open; Madrid, Spain; ATP 1000; Clay, outdoor 5–14 May 2017	–	1R	Bye			
Madrid Open; Madrid, Spain; ATP 1000; Clay, outdoor 5–14 May 2017	21 / 825	2R	(Romania) Marius Copil (WC)	104	Win	6–4, 6–3
Madrid Open; Madrid, Spain; ATP 1000; Clay, outdoor 5–14 May 2017	22 / 826	3R	(Croatia) Borna Ćorić (LL)	59	Loss	3–6, 3–6
Italian Open; Rome, Italy; ATP 1000; Clay, outdoor 15–21 May 2017
Italian Open; Rome, Italy; ATP 1000; Clay, outdoor 15–21 May 2017	–	1R	Bye			
Italian Open; Rome, Italy; ATP 1000; Clay, outdoor 15–21 May 2017	23 / 827	2R	(Italy) Fabio Fognini	29	Loss	2–6, 4–6
French Open; Paris, France; Grand Slam tournament Clay, outdoor 28 May – 11 June 2017
French Open; Paris, France; Grand Slam tournament Clay, outdoor 28 May – 11 June 2017	24 / 828	1R	(Russia) Andrey Kuznetsov	73	Win	6–4, 4–6, 6–2, 6–0
French Open; Paris, France; Grand Slam tournament Clay, outdoor 28 May – 11 June 2017	25 / 829	2R	(Slovakia) Martin Kližan	50	Win	6–7^{(3–7)}, 6–2, 6–2, 7–6^{(7–3)}
French Open; Paris, France; Grand Slam tournament Clay, outdoor 28 May – 11 June 2017	26 / 830	3R	(Argentina) Juan Martín del Potro (29)	30	Win	7–6^{(10–8)}, 7–5, 6–0
French Open; Paris, France; Grand Slam tournament Clay, outdoor 28 May – 11 June 2017	27 / 831	4R	(Russia) Karen Khachanov	53	Win	6–3, 6–4, 6–4
French Open; Paris, France; Grand Slam tournament Clay, outdoor 28 May – 11 June 2017	28 / 832	QF	(Japan) Kei Nishikori (8)	9	Win	2–6, 6–1, 7–6^{(7–0)}, 6–1
French Open; Paris, France; Grand Slam tournament Clay, outdoor 28 May – 11 June 2017	29 / 833	SF	(Switzerland) Stan Wawrinka (3)	3	Loss	7–6^{(8–6)}, 3–6, 7–5, 6–7^{(3–7)}, 1–6
Queen's Club Championships; London, United Kingdom; ATP 500; Grass, outdoor 19–25 June 2017
Queen's Club Championships; London, United Kingdom; ATP 500; Grass, outdoor 19–25 June 2017	30 / 834	1R	(Australia) Jordan Thompson (LL)	90	Loss	6–7^{(4–7)}, 2–6
Wimbledon Championships; London, United Kingdom; Grand Slam tournament Grass, outdoor 3–16 July 2017
Wimbledon Championships; London, United Kingdom; Grand Slam tournament Grass, outdoor 3–16 July 2017	31 / 835	1R	(Kazakhstan) Alexander Bublik (LL)	135	Win	6–1, 6–4, 6–2
Wimbledon Championships; London, United Kingdom; Grand Slam tournament Grass, outdoor 3–16 July 2017	32 / 836	2R	(Germany) Dustin Brown	97	Win	6–3, 6–2, 6–2
Wimbledon Championships; London, United Kingdom; Grand Slam tournament Grass, outdoor 3–16 July 2017	33 / 837	3R	(Italy) Fabio Fognini (28)	29	Win	6–2, 4–6, 6–1, 7–5
Wimbledon Championships; London, United Kingdom; Grand Slam tournament Grass, outdoor 3–16 July 2017	34 / 838	4R	(France) Benoît Paire	46	Win	7–6^{(7–1)}, 6–4, 6–4
Wimbledon Championships; London, United Kingdom; Grand Slam tournament Grass, outdoor 3–16 July 2017	35 / 839	QF	(United States) Sam Querrey (24)	28	Loss	6–3, 4–6, 7–6^{(7–4)}, 1–6, 1–6
US Open; New York City, United States; Grand Slam tournament Hard, outdoor 28 August – 10 September 2017
US Open; New York City, United States; Grand Slam tournament Hard, outdoor 28 August – 10 September 2017	Withdrew					

=== Doubles ===
Tournament	Match	Round	Opponent (seed or key)	Rank	Result	Score
Qatar Open; Doha, Qatar; ATP 250; Hard, outdoor 2–7 January 2017; Partner: (Poland) Mariusz Fyrstenberg
Qatar Open; Doha, Qatar; ATP 250; Hard, outdoor 2–7 January 2017; Partner: (Poland) Mariusz Fyrstenberg	1 / 134	1R	(Spain) Marrero / (Serbia) Zimonjić	41 / 61	Loss	2–6, 4–6
Dubai Tennis Championships; Dubai, United Arab Emirates; ATP 500; Hard, outdoor 25 February – 5 March 2017; Partner: (Serbia) Nenad Zimonjić
Dubai Tennis Championships; Dubai, United Arab Emirates; ATP 500; Hard, outdoor 25 February – 5 March 2017; Partner: (Serbia) Nenad Zimonjić	2 / 135	1R	(United Kingdom) Evans / (Luxembourg) Müller	276 / 160	Loss	1–6, 6–7^{(2–7)}
Indian Wells Masters; Indian Wells, United States; ATP 1000; Hard, outdoor 6–19 March 2017; Partner: (United Kingdom) Dan Evans
Indian Wells Masters; Indian Wells, United States; ATP 1000; Hard, outdoor 6–19 March 2017; Partner: (United Kingdom) Dan Evans	3 / 136	1R	(Spain) F. López / (Spain) M. López (5)	11 / 12	Win	6–3, 1–6, [10–6]
Indian Wells Masters; Indian Wells, United States; ATP 1000; Hard, outdoor 6–19 March 2017; Partner: (United Kingdom) Dan Evans	4 / 137	2R	(Netherlands) Rojer / (Romania) Tecău	20 / 15	Loss	4–6, 3–6

=== Exhibitions ===
Tournament	Match	Round	Opponent (Seed or Key)	Rank	Result	Score
Mubadala World Tennis Championship; Abu Dhabi, United Arab Emirates; Singles exhibition Hard, outdoor 29–31 December 2016
Mubadala World Tennis Championship; Abu Dhabi, United Arab Emirates; Singles exhibition Hard, outdoor 29–31 December 2016	–	QF	Bye			
Mubadala World Tennis Championship; Abu Dhabi, United Arab Emirates; Singles exhibition Hard, outdoor 29–31 December 2016	1	SF	(Belgium) David Goffin (5)	11	Loss	6–7^{(4–7)}, 4–6
Mubadala World Tennis Championship; Abu Dhabi, United Arab Emirates; Singles exhibition Hard, outdoor 29–31 December 2016	2	SF-B	(Canada) Milos Raonic (2)	3	Win	6–3, 7–6^{(8–6)}
The Match for Africa 3 Zürich, Switzerland; Singles exhibition Hard, indoor 10 April 2017
The Match for Africa 3 Zürich, Switzerland; Singles exhibition Hard, indoor 10 April 2017	3	F	(Switzerland) Roger Federer	4	Loss	3–6, 6–7^{(6–8)}
Match for UNICEF – Andy Murray Live; Glasgow, Scotland; Singles exhibition Hard, indoor 7 November 2017
Match for UNICEF – Andy Murray Live; Glasgow, Scotland; Singles exhibition Hard, indoor 7 November 2017	4	F	(Switzerland) Roger Federer	2	Loss	3–6, 6–3, [6–10]

== Tournament schedule ==
=== Singles schedule ===
Date	Tournament	Location	Category	Surface	Prev. result	Prev. points	New points	Result
2 January 2017– 7 January 2017	Qatar Open	Doha, Qatar	250 Series	Hard	DNP	N/A	150	Final (lost to Novak Djokovic, 3–6, 7–5, 4–6)
16 January 2017– 29 January 2017	Australian Open	Melbourne, Australia	Grand Slam	Hard	F	1200	180	Fourth round (lost to Mischa Zverev, 5–7, 7–5, 2–6, 4–6)
27 February 2017– 4 March 2017	Dubai Championships	Dubai, UAE	500 Series	Hard	DNP	N/A	500	Champion (defeated Fernando Verdasco, 6–3, 6–2)
6 March 2017– 19 March 2017	Indian Wells Masters	Indian Wells, USA	Masters 1000	Hard	3R	45	10	Second round (lost to Vasek Pospisil, 4–6, 6–7^{(5–7)})
20 March 2017 – 2 April 2017	Miami Open	Miami, USA	Masters 1000	Hard	3R	45	N/A	Withdrew due to right elbow injury
17 April 2017– 23 April 2017	Monte-Carlo Masters	Monte Carlo, Monaco	Masters 1000	Clay	SF	360	90	Third round (lost to Albert Ramos Viñolas, 6–2, 2–6, 5–7)
17 April 2017– 23 April 2017	Barcelona Open	Barcelona, Spain	500 Series	Clay	DNP	N/A	180	Semifinals (lost to Dominic Thiem, 2–6, 6–3, 4–6)
7 May 2017– 14 May 2017	Madrid Open	Madrid, Spain	Masters 1000	Clay	F	600	90	Third round (lost to Borna Ćorić, 3–6, 3–6)
14 May 2017 – 21 May 2017	Italian Masters	Rome, Italy	Masters 1000	Clay	W	1000	10	Second round (lost to Fabio Fognini, 2–6, 4–6)
28 May 2017– 11 June 2017	French Open	Paris, France	Grand Slam	Clay	F	1200	720	Semifinals (lost to Stan Wawrinka 7–6^{(8–6)}, 3–6, 7–5, 6–7^{(3–7)}, 1–6)
19 Jun 2017– 25 June 2017	Queen's Club Championships	London, Great Britain	ATP World Tour 500	Grass	W	500	0	First round (lost to Jordan Thompson 6–7^{(4–7)}, 2–6)
3 Jul 2017– 16 July 2017	The Championships, Wimbledon	London, Great Britain	Grand Slam	Grass	W	2000	360	Quarterfinals (lost to Sam Querrey 6–3, 4–6, 7–6^{(7–4)}, 1–6, 1–6)
7 Aug 2017– 13 August 2017	Canadian Open	Montreal, Canada	Masters 1000	Hard	DNP	N/A	N/A	Withdrew due to hip injury
14 Aug 2017– 20 August 2017	Cincinnati Masters	Cincinnati, United States	Masters 1000	Hard	F	600	N/A	Withdrew due to hip injury
28 Aug 2017– 10 September 2017	US Open	New York City, United States	Grand Slam	Hard	QF	360	N/A	Withdrew due to hip injury
2 Oct 2017– 8 October 2017	China Open	Beijing, China	ATP World Tour 500	Hard	W	500	N/A	Withdrew due to hip injury
9 Oct 2017– 15 October 2017	Shanghai Masters	Shanghai, China	Masters 1000	Hard	W	1000	N/A	Withdrew due to hip injury
23 Oct 2017– 29 October 2017	Vienna Open	Vienna, Austria	ATP World Tour 500	Hard	W	500	N/A	Withdrew
30 Oct 2017– 5 November 2017	Paris Masters	Paris, France	Masters 1000	Hard	W	1000	N/A	Withdrew
12 Nov 2017– 19 November 2017	ATP Finals	London, Great Britain	ATP World Tour Finals	Hard	W	1500	N/A	Did not qualify
Total year-end points						12410	2290	▼ -10120 difference

== Yearly records ==
=== Head-to-head matchups ===
Andy Murray had a 25–10 match win–loss record in the 2017 season. His record against players who were part of the ATP rankings Top Ten at the time of their meetings was 2–3. The following list is ordered by number of wins: (Bold denotes a top 10 player at the time of the most recent match between the two players, Italic denotes top 50.)

- (France) Jérémy Chardy 1–0
- (Austria) Gerald Melzer 1–0
- (Spain) Nicolás Almagro 1–0
- (Czech Republic) **Tomáš Berdych** 1–0
- (Ukraine) Illya Marchenko 1–0
- (Russia) Andrey Rublev 1–0
- (Tunisia) Malek Jaziri 1–0
- (Spain) Guillermo García López 1–0
- (Germany) Philipp Kohlschreiber 1–0
- (France) Lucas Pouille 1–0
- (Spain) Fernando Verdasco 1–0
- (Luxembourg) Gilles Müller 1–0
- (Spain) Feliciano López 1–0
- (Romania) Marius Copil 1–0
- (Russia) Andrey Kuznetsov 1–0
- (Slovakia) Martin Kližan 1–0
- (Argentina) Juan Martín del Potro 1–0
- (Russia) Karen Khachanov 1–0
- (Japan) **Kei Nishikori** 1–0
- (Kazakhstan) Alexander Bublik 1–0
- (Germany) Dustin Brown 1–0
- (France) Benoît Paire 1–0
- (Spain) Albert Ramos Viñolas 1–1
- (Italy) Fabio Fognini 1–1
- (United States) Sam Querrey 1–1
- (Serbia) **Novak Djokovic** 0–1
- (Germany) Mischa Zverev 0–1
- (Canada) Vasek Pospisil 0–1
- (Austria) **Dominic Thiem** 0–1
- (Croatia) Borna Ćorić 0–1
- (Switzerland) **Stan Wawrinka** 0–1
- (Australia) Jordan Thompson 0–1

=== Finals ===
==== Singles: 2 (1–1) ====
Category Grand Slam (0–0) ATP World Tour Finals (0–0) ATP World Tour Masters 1000 (0–0) ATP World Tour 500 (1–0) ATP World Tour 250 (0–1)	Titles by surface Hard (1–1) Clay (0–0) Grass (0–0)	Titles by conditions Outdoors (1–1) Indoors (0–0)

Result	Date	Tournament	Surface	Opponent	Score
Runner-up	7 January 2017	Qatar Open, Doha, Qatar	Hard	(Serbia) Novak Djokovic	3–6, 7–5, 4–6
Winner	4 March 2017	Dubai Tennis Championships, Dubai, United Arab Emirates	Hard	(Spain) Fernando Verdasco	6–3, 6–2

=== Earnings ===
**Singles**
Event	Prize money	Year-to-date
Qatar Open	$110,420	$110,420
Australian Open	A$220,000	$275,376
**Dubai Tennis Championships**	$523,330	$798,706
Indian Wells Masters	$22,325	$821,031
Monte-Carlo Masters	€53,435	$877,720
Barcelona Open	€114,540	$1,000,530
Madrid Open	€68,010	$1,075,300
Italian Open	€28,170	$1,106,084
French Open	€530,000	$1,698,412
Queen's Club Championships	€13,595	$1,713,630
Wimbledon Championships	£275,000	$2,071,625
		$2,071,625
**Doubles**
Event	Prize money	Year-to-date
Qatar Open	$3,205	$3,205
Dubai Tennis Championships	$5,135	$8,340
Indian Wells Masters	$12,660	$21,000
		$21,000
**Total**
		$2,092,625

Figures in United States dollars (USD) unless noted.

Bold denotes tournament win

== See also ==
- 2017 ATP World Tour
- 2017 Novak Djokovic tennis season
- 2017 Roger Federer tennis season
- 2017 Rafael Nadal tennis season
- 2017 Stan Wawrinka tennis season
