= 2017 Novak Djokovic tennis season =

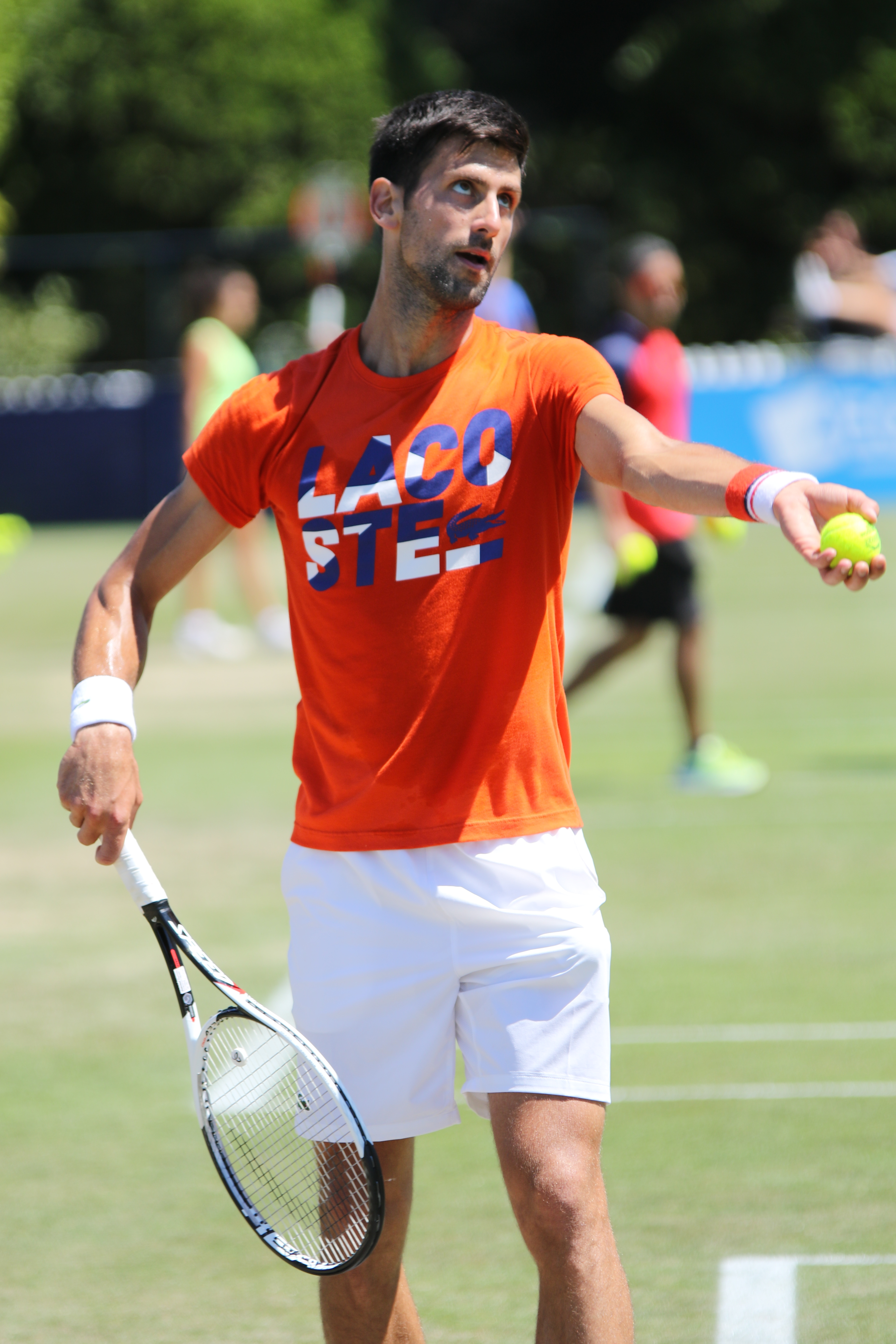
- Novak getting ready for Wimbledon (2017).
- Full name: Novak Djokovic
- Country: Serbia
- Calendar prize money: $2,116,524 (singles & doubles)

Singles
- Season record: 32–8
- Calendar titles: 2
- Current ranking: No. 12
- Ranking change from previous year: ▼10

Grand Slam & significant results
- Australian Open: 2R
- French Open: QF
- Wimbledon: QF
- US Open: A

Doubles
- Season record: 3–2
- Calendar titles: 0
- Current ranking: 234
- Year-end ranking: New entry

Grand Slam mixed doubles results
- Injuries: Elbow pain throughout the year, leading to season ending elbow injury following Wimbledon

The 2017 Novak Djokovic tennis season began on 1 January 2017 with the start of the Qatar ExxonMobil Open and ended with a quarterfinal loss at the 2017 Wimbledon Championships in July.

== Yearly summary ==
=== Asian/Pacific hard court season and Australian Open ===
==== Qatar Open ====
Djokovic's first tournament of the season was in Qatar, where he was the defending champion. In his semi-final match against Fernando Verdasco, Djokovic saved five match points, eventually winning in three sets. He would go on to win the tournament defeating long-time rival and the number one ranked Andy Murray in the final.

==== Australian Open ====
In Melbourne, Djokovic won his first round match against Verdasco in straight sets. In the Round of 64, he was upset in five sets by Denis Istomin. He was up 2 sets to 1 and was 3 points from the win in the fourth set. The loss marked Djokovic's earliest exit at a Grand Slam event since Wimbledon in 2008, and his earliest in Australia when he lost in the first round in 2006.

=== North American spring hard court season ===
==== Mexican Open ====
Djokovic accepted a wild card and made his ATP World Tour debut in Latin America. He started in Acapulco with a tough first round win against Martin Kližan. Djokovic next got the better of Juan Martín del Potro after losing the first set. Djokovic then lost to Nick Kyrgios in straight sets.

==== Indian Wells Open ====
Djokovic beat British Kyle Edmund in the second round and del Potro with a strong third set in the third round. The win over del Potro gave Djokovic his 19th consecutive win at Indian Wells, the longest win streak in the event's 43-year history. The streak was then ended, as Djokovic was beaten again by Kyrgios who overpowered him with first and second serves and a varied overall game.

=== European clay court season ===
==== Monte-Carlo Masters ====
Djokovic was hanging onto a thread throughout the tournament till the quarterfinals where that thread was cut by Belgian David Goffin, where he lost in 3 tight sets.

===== Madrid Open =====
Djokovic beat Spaniards Nicolás Almagro and Feliciano López in succession before receiving a walkover when Kei Nishikori withdrew with a wrist injury. Rafael Nadal then ended his seven match losing streak against Djokovic with a comprehensive straight sets win.

==== Italian Open ====
Djokovic successfully defended his 2016-point total by reaching the final after straight set victories over Aljaž Bedene, Roberto Bautista Agut, Juan Martín del Potro, and Dominic Thiem. However, Djokovic was then stopped by 20-year-old Alexander Zverev Jr. in the final. Shortly after the match, Djokovic confirmed a coaching partnership with Andre Agassi, beginning at Roland-Garros.

==== French Open ====
Djokovic was the defending champion. He made it to the quarter-finals, losing to Dominic Thiem in straight sets including a bagel in the final set.

=== Grass court season ===
==== Eastbourne International ====
Djokovic took a wild card in an effort to pick up some match play on grass. It was the first grass tune-up ahead of Wimbledon he had played since 2010. Djokovic went on to win the event with four straight-sets wins.

==== Wimbledon ====
Djokovic beat Martin Kližan, Adam Pavlásek and Ernests Gulbis in the first three rounds without dropping a set. In his 4th round match with Adrian Mannarino, both players were forced to move the match to the next day due to a five set battle between Rafael Nadal and Gilles Müller, which ended with less than one hour of playable daylight on a then roofless No. 1 Court, meaning that after beating Mannarino in three sets, Novak had less time to recover for the upcoming quarterfinal match against Tomáš Berdych. Fighting with persisting right elbow problems, he criticized Wimbledon organisers for delaying his 4R match instead of moving it to Centre Court. The next day he retired against Tomáš Berdych while down 6–7, 0–2, due to an elbow injury.

=== Injury hiatus ===
On July 27, Djokovic announced he would be missing the rest of the season to recover from a persistent injury on his right elbow.

Missing the last four months of the season, Djokovic saw his ranking drop to 12th, the lowest since 2007. This had been the first time Djokovic had to miss a Grand Slam since his first appearance in 2005.

== All matches ==
This table lists all the matches of Djokovic this year, including walkovers W/O (they are marked ND for non-decision)

Key
W	F	SF	QF	#R	RR	Q#	P#	DNQ	A	Z#	PO	G	S	B	NMS	NTI	P	NH

(W) winner; (F) finalist; (SF) semifinalist; (QF) quarterfinalist; (#R) rounds 4, 3, 2, 1; (RR) round-robin stage; (Q#) qualification round; (P#) preliminary round; (DNQ) did not qualify; (A) absent; (Z#) Davis/Fed Cup Zonal Group (with number indication) or (PO) play-off; (G) gold, (S) silver or (B) bronze Olympic/Paralympic medal; (NMS) not a Masters tournament; (NTI) not a Tier I tournament; (P) postponed; (NH) not held; (SR) strike rate (events won / competed); (W–L) win–loss record.
To avoid confusion and double counting, these charts are updated at the conclusion of a tournament or when the player's participation has ended.

=== Singles ===
Tournament	Match	Round	Opponent (seed or key)	Rank	Result	Score
Qatar Open; Doha, Qatar; ATP 250; Hard, outdoor 2–7 January 2017
Qatar Open; Doha, Qatar; ATP 250; Hard, outdoor 2–7 January 2017	1 / 907	1R	(Germany) Jan-Lennard Struff	63	Win	7–6^{(7–1)}, 6–3
Qatar Open; Doha, Qatar; ATP 250; Hard, outdoor 2–7 January 2017	2 / 908	2R	(Argentina) Horacio Zeballos	71	Win	6–3, 6–4
Qatar Open; Doha, Qatar; ATP 250; Hard, outdoor 2–7 January 2017	3 / 909	QF	(Czech Republic) Radek Štěpánek (Q)	103	Win	6–3, 6–3
Qatar Open; Doha, Qatar; ATP 250; Hard, outdoor 2–7 January 2017	4 / 910	SF	(Spain) Fernando Verdasco	42	Win	4–6, 7–6^{(9–7)}, 6–3
Qatar Open; Doha, Qatar; ATP 250; Hard, outdoor 2–7 January 2017	5 / 911	W	(United Kingdom) Andy Murray (1)	1	Win (1)	6–3, 5–7, 6–4
Australian Open; Melbourne, Australia; Grand Slam tournament Hard, outdoor 16–29 January 2017
Australian Open; Melbourne, Australia; Grand Slam tournament Hard, outdoor 16–29 January 2017	6 / 912	1R	(Spain) Fernando Verdasco	40	Win	6–1, 7–6^{(7–4)}, 6–2
Australian Open; Melbourne, Australia; Grand Slam tournament Hard, outdoor 16–29 January 2017	7 / 913	2R	(Uzbekistan) Denis Istomin (WC)	117	Loss	6–7^{(8–10)}, 7–5, 6–2, 6–7^{(5–7)}, 4–6
Davis Cup World Group First round Niš, Serbia; Davis Cup; Hard, indoor 3–5 February 2017
Davis Cup World Group First round Niš, Serbia; Davis Cup; Hard, indoor 3–5 February 2017	8 / 914	1R; R1	(Russia) Daniil Medvedev	63	Win	3–6, 6–4, 6–1, 1–0 ret.
Mexican Open; Acapulco, Mexico; ATP 500; Hard, outdoor 27 February 2017–4 March 2017
Mexican Open; Acapulco, Mexico; ATP 500; Hard, outdoor 27 February 2017–4 March 2017	9 / 915	1R	(Slovakia) Martin Kližan	62	Win	6–3, 7–6^{(7–4)}
Mexican Open; Acapulco, Mexico; ATP 500; Hard, outdoor 27 February 2017–4 March 2017	10 / 916	2R	(Argentina) Juan Martín del Potro	32	Win	4–6, 6–4, 6–4
Mexican Open; Acapulco, Mexico; ATP 500; Hard, outdoor 27 February 2017–4 March 2017	11 / 917	QF	(Australia) Nick Kyrgios (6)	17	Loss	6–7^{(9–11)}, 5–7
Indian Wells Masters; Indian Wells, United States; ATP 1000; Hard, outdoor 9–19 March 2017
Indian Wells Masters; Indian Wells, United States; ATP 1000; Hard, outdoor 9–19 March 2017	–	1R	Bye			
Indian Wells Masters; Indian Wells, United States; ATP 1000; Hard, outdoor 9–19 March 2017	12 / 918	2R	(United Kingdom) Kyle Edmund	46	Win	6–4, 7–6^{(7–5)}
Indian Wells Masters; Indian Wells, United States; ATP 1000; Hard, outdoor 9–19 March 2017	13 / 919	3R	(Argentina) Juan Martín del Potro (31)	35	Win	7–5, 4–6, 6–1
Indian Wells Masters; Indian Wells, United States; ATP 1000; Hard, outdoor 9–19 March 2017	14 / 920	4R	(Australia) Nick Kyrgios (15)	16	Loss	4–6, 6–7^{(3–7)}
Davis Cup World Group Quarter-Final; Belgrade, Serbia; Davis Cup; Hard, indoor 7–9 April 2017
Davis Cup World Group Quarter-Final; Belgrade, Serbia; Davis Cup; Hard, indoor 7–9 April 2017	15 / 921	QF	(Spain) Albert Ramos Viñolas	24	Win	6–3, 6–4, 6–2
Monte-Carlo Masters; Monte Carlo, Monaco; ATP 1000; Clay, outdoor 17–23 April 2017
Monte-Carlo Masters; Monte Carlo, Monaco; ATP 1000; Clay, outdoor 17–23 April 2017	–	1R	Bye			
Monte-Carlo Masters; Monte Carlo, Monaco; ATP 1000; Clay, outdoor 17–23 April 2017	16 / 922	2R	(France) Gilles Simon	32	Win	6–3, 3–6, 7–5
Monte-Carlo Masters; Monte Carlo, Monaco; ATP 1000; Clay, outdoor 17–23 April 2017	17 / 923	3R	(Spain) Pablo Carreño Busta (13)	19	Win	6–2, 4–6, 6–4
Monte-Carlo Masters; Monte Carlo, Monaco; ATP 1000; Clay, outdoor 17–23 April 2017	18 / 924	QF	(Belgium) David Goffin (10)	13	Loss	2–6, 6–3, 5–7
Madrid Open; Madrid, Spain; ATP 1000; Clay, outdoor 5–14 May 2017
Madrid Open; Madrid, Spain; ATP 1000; Clay, outdoor 5–14 May 2017	–	1R	Bye			
Madrid Open; Madrid, Spain; ATP 1000; Clay, outdoor 5–14 May 2017	19 / 925	2R	(Spain) Nicolás Almagro (WC)	76	Win	6–1, 4–6, 7–5
Madrid Open; Madrid, Spain; ATP 1000; Clay, outdoor 5–14 May 2017	20 / 926	3R	(Spain) Feliciano López	38	Win	6–4, 7–5
Madrid Open; Madrid, Spain; ATP 1000; Clay, outdoor 5–14 May 2017	–	QF	(Japan) Kei Nishikori (8)	6	Walkover	N/A
Madrid Open; Madrid, Spain; ATP 1000; Clay, outdoor 5–14 May 2017	21 / 927	SF	(Spain) Rafael Nadal (4)	5	Loss	2–6, 4–6
Italian Open; Rome, Italy; ATP 1000; Clay, outdoor 15–21 May 2017
Italian Open; Rome, Italy; ATP 1000; Clay, outdoor 15–21 May 2017	–	1R	Bye			
Italian Open; Rome, Italy; ATP 1000; Clay, outdoor 15–21 May 2017	22 / 928	2R	(United Kingdom) Aljaž Bedene (Q)	55	Win	7–6^{(7–2)}, 6–2
Italian Open; Rome, Italy; ATP 1000; Clay, outdoor 15–21 May 2017	23 / 929	3R	(Spain) Roberto Bautista Agut	20	Win	6–4, 6–4
Italian Open; Rome, Italy; ATP 1000; Clay, outdoor 15–21 May 2017	24 / 930	QF	(Argentina) Juan Martín del Potro	34	Win	6–1, 6–4
Italian Open; Rome, Italy; ATP 1000; Clay, outdoor 15–21 May 2017	25 / 931	SF	(Austria) Dominic Thiem (8)	7	Win	6–1, 6–0
Italian Open; Rome, Italy; ATP 1000; Clay, outdoor 15–21 May 2017	26 / 932	F	(Germany) Alexander Zverev (16)	17	Loss (1)	4–6, 3–6
French Open; Paris, France; Grand Slam tournament Clay, outdoor 28 May – 11 June 2017
French Open; Paris, France; Grand Slam tournament Clay, outdoor 28 May – 11 June 2017	27 / 933	1R	(Spain) Marcel Granollers	77	Win	6–3, 6–4, 6–2
French Open; Paris, France; Grand Slam tournament Clay, outdoor 28 May – 11 June 2017	28 / 934	2R	(Portugal) João Sousa	59	Win	6–1, 6–4, 6–3
French Open; Paris, France; Grand Slam tournament Clay, outdoor 28 May – 11 June 2017	29 / 935	3R	(Argentina) Diego Schwartzman	41	Win	5–7, 6–3, 3–6, 6–1, 6–1
French Open; Paris, France; Grand Slam tournament Clay, outdoor 28 May – 11 June 2017	30 / 936	4R	(Spain) Albert Ramos Viñolas (19)	20	Win	7–6^{(7–5)}, 6–1, 6–3
French Open; Paris, France; Grand Slam tournament Clay, outdoor 28 May – 11 June 2017	31 / 937	QF	(Austria) Dominic Thiem (6)	7	Loss	6–7^{(5–7)}, 3–6, 0–6
Eastbourne International; Eastbourne, United Kingdom; ATP 250; Grass, outdoor 26 June – 1 July 2017
Eastbourne International; Eastbourne, United Kingdom; ATP 250; Grass, outdoor 26 June – 1 July 2017	–	1R	Bye			
Eastbourne International; Eastbourne, United Kingdom; ATP 250; Grass, outdoor 26 June – 1 July 2017	32 / 938	2R	(Canada) Vasek Pospisil (Q)	75	Win	6–4, 6–3
Eastbourne International; Eastbourne, United Kingdom; ATP 250; Grass, outdoor 26 June – 1 July 2017	33 / 939	QF	(United States) Donald Young	47	Win	6–2, 7–6^{(11–9)}
Eastbourne International; Eastbourne, United Kingdom; ATP 250; Grass, outdoor 26 June – 1 July 2017	34 / 940	SF	(Russia) Daniil Medvedev	52	Win	6–4, 6–4
Eastbourne International; Eastbourne, United Kingdom; ATP 250; Grass, outdoor 26 June – 1 July 2017	35 / 941	W	(France) Gaël Monfils (2)	16	Win (2)	6–3, 6–4
Wimbledon Championships; London, United Kingdom; Grand Slam tournament Grass, outdoor 3–16 July 2017
Wimbledon Championships; London, United Kingdom; Grand Slam tournament Grass, outdoor 3–16 July 2017	36 / 942	1R	(Slovakia) Martin Kližan	44	Win	6–3, 2–0 ret.
Wimbledon Championships; London, United Kingdom; Grand Slam tournament Grass, outdoor 3–16 July 2017	37 / 943	2R	(Czech Republic) Adam Pavlásek	136	Win	6–2, 6–2, 6–1
Wimbledon Championships; London, United Kingdom; Grand Slam tournament Grass, outdoor 3–16 July 2017	38 / 944	3R	(Latvia) Ernests Gulbis (PR)	589	Win	6–4, 6–1, 7–6^{(7–2)}
Wimbledon Championships; London, United Kingdom; Grand Slam tournament Grass, outdoor 3–16 July 2017	39 / 945	4R	(France) Adrian Mannarino	51	Win	6–2, 7–6^{(7–5)}, 6–4
Wimbledon Championships; London, United Kingdom; Grand Slam tournament Grass, outdoor 3–16 July 2017	40 / 946	QF	(Czech Republic) Tomáš Berdych (11)	15	Loss	6–7^{(2–7)}, 0–2 ret.

=== Doubles ===
Tournament	Match	Round	Opponent (seed or key)	Rank	Result	Score
Indian Wells Masters; Indian Wells, United States; ATP 1000; Hard, outdoor 9–19 March 2017; Partner: (Serbia) Viktor Troicki
Indian Wells Masters; Indian Wells, United States; ATP 1000; Hard, outdoor 9–19 March 2017; Partner: (Serbia) Viktor Troicki	1 / 101	1R	(India) Bopanna / (Uruguay) Cuevas	23 / 33	Win	2–6, 6–3, [10–7]
Indian Wells Masters; Indian Wells, United States; ATP 1000; Hard, outdoor 9–19 March 2017; Partner: (Serbia) Viktor Troicki	2 / 102	2R	(France) Herbert / (France) Mahut (1)	2 / 1	Win	5–7, 6–1, [11–9]
Indian Wells Masters; Indian Wells, United States; ATP 1000; Hard, outdoor 9–19 March 2017; Partner: (Serbia) Viktor Troicki	3 / 103	QF	(South Africa) Klaasen / (United States) Ram (6)	13 / 14	Loss	6–3, 2–6, [6–10]
Monte-Carlo Masters; Monte Carlo, Monaco; ATP 1000; Clay, outdoor 17–23 April 2017; Partner: (Serbia) Viktor Troicki
Monte-Carlo Masters; Monte Carlo, Monaco; ATP 1000; Clay, outdoor 17–23 April 2017; Partner: (Serbia) Viktor Troicki	4 / 104	1R	(Luxembourg) Müller / (France) Simon	75 / 342	Win	7–5, 6–3
Monte-Carlo Masters; Monte Carlo, Monaco; ATP 1000; Clay, outdoor 17–23 April 2017; Partner: (Serbia) Viktor Troicki	5 / 105	2R	(Finland) Kontinen / (Australia) Peers (1)	1 / 2	Loss	3–6, 4–6

== Tournament schedule ==
=== Singles schedule ===
Date	Tournament	Location	Category	Surface	Prev. result	Prev. points	New points	Result
2 January 2017– 7 January 2017	Qatar Open	Doha, Qatar	250 Series	Hard	W	250	250	Champion (defeated Andy Murray, 6–3, 5–7, 6–4)
16 January 2017– 29 January 2017	Australian Open	Melbourne, Australia	Grand Slam	Hard	W	2000	45	Second round (lost to Denis Istomin, 6–7^{(8–10)}, 7–5, 6–2, 6–7^{(5–7)}, 4–6)
3 February 2017– 5 February 2017	Davis Cup: Serbia vs. Russia	Niš, Serbia	Davis Cup	Hard(i)	QF	N/A	N/A	Serbia progresses to WG QF ( SRB def. (Russia) RUS, 4–1)
27 February 2017– 4 March 2017	Mexican Open	Acapulco, Mexico	500 Series	Hard	DNP	N/A	90	Quarterfinals (lost to Nick Kyrgios, 6–7^{(9–11))}, 5–7
6 March 2017 – 19 March 2017	Indian Wells Masters	Indian Wells, USA	Masters 1000	Hard	W	1000	90	Fourth round (lost to Nick Kyrgios, 4–6, 6–7^{(3–7)})
20 March 2017 – 2 April 2017	Miami Open	Miami, USA	Masters 1000	Hard	W	1000	N/A	Withdrew due to right elbow injury
16 April 2017 – 23 April 2017	Monte-Carlo Masters	Roquebrune-Cap-Martin, Monaco	Masters 1000	Clay	2R	10	180	Quarterfinals (lost to David Goffin, 2–6, 6–3, 5–7)
7 May 2017 – 14 May 2017	Madrid Open	Madrid, Spain	Masters 1000	Clay	W	1000	360	Semifinals (lost to Rafael Nadal, 2−6, 4−6)
14 May 2017 – 21 May 2017	Italian Open	Rome	Masters 1000	Clay	F	600	600	Final (lost to Alexander Zverev Jr., 4–6, 3–6)
28 May 2017– 11 June 2017	French Open	Paris, France	Grand Slam	Clay	W	2000	360	Quarterfinals (lost to Dominic Thiem, 6–7^{(5–7)}, 3–6, 0–6)
26 June 2017– 1 July 2017	Eastbourne International	Eastbourne, United Kingdom	250 Series	Grass	DNP	N/A	250	Champion (defeated Gaël Monfils, 6–3, 6–4)
3 Jul 2017– 16 July 2017	Wimbledon	London, Great Britain	Grand Slam	Grass	3R	90	360	Quarterfinals (lost to Tomáš Berdych, 6–7^{(2–7)}, 0–2 ret.)
7 August 2017– 13 August 2017	Canadian Open	Montreal	Masters 1000	Hard	W	1000	N/A	Withdrew
14 August 2017– 20 August 2017	Cincinnati Masters	Cincinnati	Masters 1000	Hard	DNP	N/A	N/A	Withdrew
28 August 2017– 10 September 2017	US Open	New York City	Grand Slam	Hard	F	1200	N/A	Withdrew
9 October 2017– 15 October 2017	Shanghai Masters	Shanghai	Masters 1000	Hard	SF	360	N/A	Withdrew
30 October 2017– 5 November 2017	Paris Masters	Paris	Masters 1000	Hard (i)	QF	180	N/A	Withdrew
12 Nov 2017– 19 November 2017	ATP Finals	London	Tour Finals	Hard (i)	F	1000	N/A	Did not qualify
Total year-end points						11780	2585	▼ -9195 difference

== Yearly records ==
=== Head-to-head matchups ===
Novak Djokovic had a 2–2 record against the top 10, 15–4 against the top 11–50, 14–1 against other players; 22–7 against right-handed players and 10–1 against left-handed players.

Ordered by number of wins (Bolded number marks a top 10 player at the time of first match of the year, Italic means top 50; "L" means left-handed player).

- (Argentina) Juan Martín del Potro 3–0
- (Spain) Fernando Verdasco (L) 2–0
- (Spain) Albert Ramos Viñolas (L) 2–0
- (Russia) Daniil Medvedev 2–0
- (Slovakia) Martin Kližan (L) 2–0
- **(United Kingdom) Andy Murray** 1–0
- (United Kingdom) Kyle Edmund 1–0
- (Germany) Jan-Lennard Struff 1–0
- (Argentina) Horacio Zeballos (L) 1–0
- (France) Gilles Simon 1–0
- (France) Gaël Monfils 1–0
- (Czech Republic) Radek Štěpánek 1–0
- (Spain) Pablo Carreño Busta 1–0
- (Spain) Nicolás Almagro 1–0
- (Spain) Feliciano López (L) 1–0
- (United Kingdom) Aljaž Bedene 1–0
- (Spain) Roberto Bautista Agut 1–0
- (Spain) Marcel Granollers 1–0
- (Portugal) João Sousa 1–0
- (Argentina) Diego Schwartzman 1–0
- (Canada) Vasek Pospisil 1–0
- (United States) Donald Young (L) 1–0
- (Czech Republic) Adam Pavlásek 1–0
- (Latvia) Ernests Gulbis 1–0
- (France) Adrian Mannarino (L) 1–0
- **(Austria) Dominic Thiem** 1–1
- (Czech Republic) Tomáš Berdych 0–1
- (Belgium) David Goffin 0–1
- (Uzbekistan) Denis Istomin 0–1
- **(Spain) Rafael Nadal (L)** 0–1
- (Germany) Alexander Zverev 0–1
- (Australia) Nick Kyrgios 0–2

=== Finals ===
==== Singles: 3 (2 titles, 1 runner-up) ====
Category Grand Slam (0–0) ATP World Tour Finals (0–0) ATP World Tour Masters 1000 (0–1) ATP World Tour 500 (0–0) ATP World Tour 250 (2–0)	Titles by surface Hard (1–0) Clay (0–1) Grass (1–0)	Titles by conditions Outdoors (2–1) Indoors (0–0)

Result	Date	Tournament	Surface	Opponent	Score
Winner	January 7, 2017	Qatar Open, Qatar	Hard	(United Kingdom) Andy Murray	6–3, 5–7, 6–4
Runner-up	May 21, 2017	Italian Open, Italy	Clay	(Germany) Alexander Zverev	4–6, 3–6
Winner	July 1, 2017	Eastbourne International, U.K.	Grass	(France) Gaël Monfils	6–3, 6–4

=== Earnings ===
**Singles**
Event	Prize money	Year-to-date
**Qatar Open**	**$209,665**	**$209,665**
Australian Open	A$80,000	$269,649
Mexican Open	$40,305	$309,954
Indian Wells Masters	$77,265	$387,219
Monte-Carlo Masters	€102,900	$496,385
Madrid Open	€257,555	$779,540
Italian Open	€402,080	$1,218,931
French Open	€340,000	$1,598,915
**Eastbourne International**	**€113,330**	**$1,725,745**
Wimbledon Championships	£275,000	$2,083,742
		$2,083,742
**Doubles**
Event	Prize money	Year-to-date
Indian Wells Masters	$24,005	$24,005
Monte-Carlo Masters	€8,275	$32,784
		$32,784
**Total**
		$2,116,524

Figures in United States dollars (USD) unless noted.

Bold denotes tournament win

== See also ==
- 2017 ATP World Tour
- 2017 Roger Federer tennis season
- 2017 Rafael Nadal tennis season
- 2017 Andy Murray tennis season
- 2017 Stan Wawrinka tennis season
