= 2017 Stan Wawrinka tennis season =

- Full name: Stan Wawrinka
- Country: Switzerland
- Calendar prize money: $2,802,229

Singles
- Season record: 26–11
- Calendar titles: 1
- Current ranking: No. 9
- Ranking change from previous year: ▼5

Grand Slam & significant results
- Australian Open: SF
- French Open: F
- Wimbledon: 1R
- US Open: A

Doubles
- Season record: 1–3
- Calendar titles: 0
- Current ranking: No. 341
- Ranking change from previous year: ▲245

Grand Slam mixed doubles results
- Injuries: knee injury
- Last updated on: 24 July 2017.

The 2017 Stan Wawrinka season started with the 2017 Brisbane International and ended with a first round loss at Wimbledon.

== Year summary ==
=== Australian Open and early hard court season ===
==== Brisbane International ====
Wawrinka opened his season for the first time in his career in Brisbane after eight consecutive years in Chennai. After a bye in the first round he beat Viktor Troicki. In the quarter-finals, Wawrinka beat Kyle Edmund in three sets. In the semifinal the Swiss player was defeated by Kei Nishikori.

==== Australian Open ====
Wawrinka entered the first Grand Slam of the year as the fourth seed. In the first round he rescues, only to be defeated by Martin Klizan. Wawrinka lost the first set 4–6, but the Swiss won the following two sets by 6–4, 7–5. When the match seemed to be in the Stan's hands Klizan recovered and he broke Wawrinka in the seventh game of the fourth set. In the final set Wawrinka was under a break with the score of 2–4. Wawrinka retrieved again and at the end he won the set and the match. In the following rounds the Swiss faced in order Steve Johnson, Viktor Troicki and Andreas Seppi. In these three matches Wawrinka lost only one set against the Serbian tennis player and he was particularly in trouble with Seppi who was defeated in three tie-breaks by the Swiss. In the quarter-finals Wawrinka's opponent was the French Jo-Wilfried Tsonga. Wawrinka got rid of Tsonga quickly in three sets. In the semifinal Wawrinka faced his compatriot Roger Federer and was beaten in five sets.

==== Dubai Open ====
Wawrinka is the defending champion in Dubai. The Swiss player lost in the first round against Damir Džumhur in two sets, despite the Wawrinka's advantage of one break in the first set.

==== Indian Wells Masters ====
Wawrinka entered the final and ended up losing to Roger Federer in two close sets.

=== Clay court season and French Open ===
==== Geneva Open ====
Stan Wawrinka retained his title at Geneva Open

==== French Open ====
At the French Open Wawrinka, the 2015 champion, reached the final round but lost to Rafael Nadal 6–2, 6–3, 6–1. Nadal won a record 10th Roland Garros title on his favoured clay surface, his first Grand Slam victory since the 2014 French Open.

== All matches ==
This table chronicles all the matches of Stan Wawrinka in 2017, including walkovers (W/O) which the ATP does not count as wins. They are marked ND for non-decision or no decision.

Key
| W | F | SF | QF | #R | RR | Q# | P# | DNQ | A | Z# | PO | G | S | B | NMS | NTI | P | NH |

(W) winner; (F) finalist; (SF) semifinalist; (QF) quarterfinalist; (#R) rounds 4, 3, 2, 1; (RR) round-robin stage; (Q#) qualification round; (P#) preliminary round; (DNQ) did not qualify; (A) absent; (Z#) Davis/Fed Cup Zonal Group (with number indication) or (PO) play-off; (G) gold, (S) silver or (B) bronze Olympic/Paralympic medal; (NMS) not a Masters tournament; (NTI) not a Tier I tournament; (P) postponed; (NH) not held; (SR) strike rate (events won / competed); (W–L) win–loss record.
To avoid confusion and double counting, these charts are updated at the conclusion of a tournament or when the player's participation has ended.

=== Singles matches ===
| Tournament | Match | Round | Opponent (seed or key) | Rank | Result | Score |
|---|---|---|---|---|---|---|
Brisbane International; Brisbane, Australia; ATP 250; Hard, outdoor 1 – 8 January 2017
| Brisbane International; Brisbane, Australia; ATP 250; Hard, outdoor 1 – 8 January 2017 | – | 1R | Bye | | | |
| Brisbane International; Brisbane, Australia; ATP 250; Hard, outdoor 1 – 8 January 2017 | 1 / 691 | 2R | (Serbia) Viktor Troicki | 29 | Win | 7–6^{(7–5)}, 6–4 |
| Brisbane International; Brisbane, Australia; ATP 250; Hard, outdoor 1 – 8 January 2017 | 2 / 692 | QF | (United Kingdom) Kyle Edmund | 45 | Win | 6–7^{(2–7)}, 6–4, 6–4 |
| Brisbane International; Brisbane, Australia; ATP 250; Hard, outdoor 1 – 8 January 2017 | 3 / 693 | SF | (Japan) Kei Nishikori (3) | 5 | Loss | 6–7^{(3–7)}, 3–6 |
Australian Open; Melbourne, Australia; Grand Slam tournament Hard, outdoor 16 – 29 January 2017
| Australian Open; Melbourne, Australia; Grand Slam tournament Hard, outdoor 16 – 29 January 2017 | 4 / 694 | 1R | (Slovakia) Martin Kližan | 34 | Win | 4–6, 6–4, 7–5, 4–6, 6–4 |
| Australian Open; Melbourne, Australia; Grand Slam tournament Hard, outdoor 16 – 29 January 2017 | 5 / 695 | 2R | (United States) Steve Johnson | 30 | Win | 6–3, 6–4, 6–4 |
| Australian Open; Melbourne, Australia; Grand Slam tournament Hard, outdoor 16 – 29 January 2017 | 6 / 696 | 3R | (Serbia) Viktor Troicki (29) | 35 | Win | 3–6, 6–2, 6–2, 7–6^{(9–7)} |
| Australian Open; Melbourne, Australia; Grand Slam tournament Hard, outdoor 16 – 29 January 2017 | 7 / 697 | 4R | (Italy) Andreas Seppi | 89 | Win | 7–6^{(7–2)}, 7–6^{(7–4)}, 7–6^{(7–4)} |
| Australian Open; Melbourne, Australia; Grand Slam tournament Hard, outdoor 16 – 29 January 2017 | 8 / 698 | QF | (France) Jo-Wilfried Tsonga (12) | 12 | Win | 7–6^{(7–2)}, 6–4, 6–3 |
| Australian Open; Melbourne, Australia; Grand Slam tournament Hard, outdoor 16 – 29 January 2017 | 9 / 699 | SF | (Switzerland) Roger Federer (17) | 17 | Loss | 5–7, 3–6, 6–1, 6–4, 3–6 |
Dubai Tennis Championships; Dubai, United Arab Emirates; ATP 500; Hard, outdoor 27 February – 4 March 2017
| Dubai Tennis Championships; Dubai, United Arab Emirates; ATP 500; Hard, outdoor 27 February – 4 March 2017 | 10 / 700 | 1R | (Bosnia and Herzegovina) Damir Džumhur | 77 | Loss | 6–7^{(4–7)}, 3–6 |
Indian Wells Masters; Indian Wells, United States; ATP 1000; Hard, outdoor 6 – 19 March 2017
| Indian Wells Masters; Indian Wells, United States; ATP 1000; Hard, outdoor 6 – 19 March 2017 | – | 1R | Bye | | | |
| Indian Wells Masters; Indian Wells, United States; ATP 1000; Hard, outdoor 6 – 19 March 2017 | 11 / 701 | 2R | (Italy) Paolo Lorenzi | 38 | Win | 6–3, 6–4 |
| Indian Wells Masters; Indian Wells, United States; ATP 1000; Hard, outdoor 6 – 19 March 2017 | 12 / 702 | 3R | (Germany) Philipp Kohlschreiber (28) | 31 | Win | 7–5, 6–3 |
| Indian Wells Masters; Indian Wells, United States; ATP 1000; Hard, outdoor 6 – 19 March 2017 | 13 / 703 | 4R | (Japan) Yoshihito Nishioka (LL) | 70 | Win | 3–6, 6–3, 7–6^{(7–4)} |
| Indian Wells Masters; Indian Wells, United States; ATP 1000; Hard, outdoor 6 – 19 March 2017 | 14 / 704 | QF | (Austria) Dominic Thiem (8) | 9 | Win | 6–4, 4–6, 7–6^{(7–2)} |
| Indian Wells Masters; Indian Wells, United States; ATP 1000; Hard, outdoor 6 – 19 March 2017 | 15 / 705 | SF | (Spain) Pablo Carreño Busta (21) | 23 | Win | 6–2, 6–2 |
| Indian Wells Masters; Indian Wells, United States; ATP 1000; Hard, outdoor 6 – 19 March 2017 | 16 / 706 | F | (Switzerland) Roger Federer (9) | 10 | Loss (1) | 4–6, 5–7 |
Miami Masters; Key Biscayne, United States; ATP 1000; Hard, outdoor 20 March – 2 April 2017
| Miami Masters; Key Biscayne, United States; ATP 1000; Hard, outdoor 20 March – 2 April 2017 | – | 1R | Bye | | | |
| Miami Masters; Key Biscayne, United States; ATP 1000; Hard, outdoor 20 March – 2 April 2017 | 17 / 707 | 2R | (Argentina) Horacio Zeballos | 75 | Win | 6–3, 6–4 |
| Miami Masters; Key Biscayne, United States; ATP 1000; Hard, outdoor 20 March – 2 April 2017 | 18 / 708 | 3R | (Tunisia) Malek Jaziri | 53 | Win | 6–3, 6–4 |
| Miami Masters; Key Biscayne, United States; ATP 1000; Hard, outdoor 20 March – 2 April 2017 | 19 / 709 | 4R | (Germany) Alexander Zverev (16) | 20 | Loss | 6–4, 2–6, 1–6 |
Monte-Carlo Masters; Monte Carlo, Monaco; ATP 1000; Clay, outdoor 17 – 23 April 2017
| Monte-Carlo Masters; Monte Carlo, Monaco; ATP 1000; Clay, outdoor 17 – 23 April 2017 | – | 1R | Bye | | | |
| Monte-Carlo Masters; Monte Carlo, Monaco; ATP 1000; Clay, outdoor 17 – 23 April 2017 | 20 / 710 | 2R | (Czech Republic) Jiří Veselý | 54 | Win | 6–2, 4–6, 6–2 |
| Monte-Carlo Masters; Monte Carlo, Monaco; ATP 1000; Clay, outdoor 17 – 23 April 2017 | 21 / 711 | 3R | (Uruguay) Pablo Cuevas (16) | 27 | Loss | 4–6, 4–6 |
Madrid Open; Madrid, Spain; ATP 1000; Clay, outdoor 7 – 14 May 2017
| Madrid Open; Madrid, Spain; ATP 1000; Clay, outdoor 7 – 14 May 2017 | – | 1R | Bye | | | |
| Madrid Open; Madrid, Spain; ATP 1000; Clay, outdoor 7 – 14 May 2017 | 22 / 712 | 2R | (France) Benoît Paire | 52 | Loss | 5–7, 6–4, 2–6 |
Italian Open; Rome, Italy; ATP 1000; Clay, outdoor 15 – 21 May 2017
| Italian Open; Rome, Italy; ATP 1000; Clay, outdoor 15 – 21 May 2017 | – | 1R | Bye | | | |
| Italian Open; Rome, Italy; ATP 1000; Clay, outdoor 15 – 21 May 2017 | 23 / 713 | 2R | (France) Benoît Paire | 44 | Win | 6–3, 1–6, 6–3 |
| Italian Open; Rome, Italy; ATP 1000; Clay, outdoor 15 – 21 May 2017 | 24 / 714 | 3R | (United States) John Isner | 24 | Loss | 6–7^{(1–7)}, 4–6 |
Geneva Open; Geneva, Switzerland; ATP 250; Clay, outdoor 21 – 27 May 2017
| Geneva Open; Geneva, Switzerland; ATP 250; Clay, outdoor 21 – 27 May 2017 | – | 1R | Bye | | | |
| Geneva Open; Geneva, Switzerland; ATP 250; Clay, outdoor 21 – 27 May 2017 | 25 / 715 | 2R | (Brazil) Rogério Dutra Silva | 78 | Win | 5–2 ret. |
| Geneva Open; Geneva, Switzerland; ATP 250; Clay, outdoor 21 – 27 May 2017 | 26 / 716 | QF | (United States) Sam Querrey (6) | 28 | Win | 4–6, 7–5, 6–2 |
| Geneva Open; Geneva, Switzerland; ATP 250; Clay, outdoor 21 – 27 May 2017 | 27 / 717 | SF | (Russia) Andrey Kuznetsov | 85 | Win | 6–3, 7–6^{(7–4)} |
| Geneva Open; Geneva, Switzerland; ATP 250; Clay, outdoor 21 – 27 May 2017 | 28 / 718 | W | (Germany) Mischa Zverev (Q) | 33 | Win (1) | 4–6, 6–3, 6–3 |
French Open; Paris, France; Grand Slam tournament Clay, outdoor 28 May – 11 June 2017
| French Open; Paris, France; Grand Slam tournament Clay, outdoor 28 May – 11 June 2017 | 29 / 719 | 1R | (Slovakia) Jozef Kovalík (Q) | 152 | Win | 6–2, 7–6^{(8–6)}, 6–3 |
| French Open; Paris, France; Grand Slam tournament Clay, outdoor 28 May – 11 June 2017 | 30 / 720 | 2R | (Ukraine) Alexandr Dolgopolov | 89 | Win | 6–4, 7–6^{(7–5)}, 7–5 |
| French Open; Paris, France; Grand Slam tournament Clay, outdoor 28 May – 11 June 2017 | 31 / 721 | 3R | (Italy) Fabio Fognini (28) | 29 | Win | 7–6^{(7–2)}, 6–0, 6–2 |
| French Open; Paris, France; Grand Slam tournament Clay, outdoor 28 May – 11 June 2017 | 32 / 722 | 4R | (France) Gael Monfils (15) | 16 | Win | 7–5, 7–6^{(9–7)}, 6–2 |
| French Open; Paris, France; Grand Slam tournament Clay, outdoor 28 May – 11 June 2017 | 33 / 723 | QF | (Croatia) Marin Čilić (7) | 8 | Win | 6–3, 6–3, 6–1 |
| French Open; Paris, France; Grand Slam tournament Clay, outdoor 28 May – 11 June 2017 | 34 / 724 | SF | (United Kingdom) Andy Murray (1) | 1 | Win | 6–7^{(6–8)}, 6–3, 5–7, 7–6^{(7–3)}, 6–1 |
| French Open; Paris, France; Grand Slam tournament Clay, outdoor 28 May – 11 June 2017 | 35 / 725 | F | (Spain) Rafael Nadal (4) | 4 | Loss (2) | 2–6, 3–6, 1–6 |
Queen's Club Championships; London, United Kingdom; ATP 500; Grass, outdoor 19 – 25 June 2017
| Queen's Club Championships; London, United Kingdom; ATP 500; Grass, outdoor 19 – 25 June 2017 | 36 / 726 | 1R | (Spain) Feliciano López | 32 | Loss | 6–7^{(4–7)}, 5–7 |
Wimbledon Championships; London, United Kingdom; Grand Slam tournament Grass, outdoor 3 – 16 July 2017
| Wimbledon Championships; London, United Kingdom; Grand Slam tournament Grass, outdoor 3 – 16 July 2017 | 37 / 727 | 1R | (Russia) Daniil Medvedev | 49 | Loss | 4–6, 6–3, 4–6, 1–6 |

=== Doubles matches ===
| Tournament | Match | Round | Opponents (seed or key) | Ranks | Result | Score |
|---|---|---|---|---|---|---|
Brisbane International; Brisbane, Australia; ATP 250; Hard, outdoor 1 – 8 January 2017; Partner: (France) Lucas Pouille
| Brisbane International; Brisbane, Australia; ATP 250; Hard, outdoor 1 – 8 January 2017; Partner: (France) Lucas Pouille | 1 | 1R | (Australia) Thanasi Kokkinakis / (Australia) Jordan Thompson (WC) | #- / #115 | Loss | 2–6, 6–2, [9–11] |
Indian Wells Masters; Indian Wells, United States; ATP 1000; Hard, outdoor 6 – 19 March 2017; Partner: (Bulgaria) Grigor Dimitrov
| Indian Wells Masters; Indian Wells, United States; ATP 1000; Hard, outdoor 6 – 19 March 2017; Partner: (Bulgaria) Grigor Dimitrov | 2 | 1R | (Philippines) Treat Huey / (Belarus) Max Mirnyi | #30 / #29 | Loss | 4–6, 6–3, [3–10] |
Monte-Carlo Masters; Monte Carlo, Monaco; ATP 1000; Clay, outdoor 17 – 23 April 2017; Partner: (Italy) Fabio Fognini
| Monte-Carlo Masters; Monte Carlo, Monaco; ATP 1000; Clay, outdoor 17 – 23 April 2017; Partner: (Italy) Fabio Fognini | 3 | 1R | (Belarus) Max Mirnyi / (Canada) Daniel Nestor | #34 / #22 | Win | 6–4, 7–6^{(7–2)} |
| Monte-Carlo Masters; Monte Carlo, Monaco; ATP 1000; Clay, outdoor 17 – 23 April 2017; Partner: (Italy) Fabio Fognini | 4 | 2R | (France) Pierre-Hugues Herbert / (France) Nicolas Mahut (2) | #9 / #6 | Loss | 5–7, 2–6 |

=== Exhibition matches ===
| Tournament | Match | Round | Opponent (Seed or Key) | Rank | Result | Score |
|---|---|---|---|---|---|---|
Tie Break Tens; Madrid, Spain; Singles exhibition Clay, indoor 4 May 2017
| Tie Break Tens; Madrid, Spain; Singles exhibition Clay, indoor 4 May 2017 | 1 | QF | (Spain) Feliciano López | 37 | Loss | [1–10] |

== Tournament schedule ==
=== Singles ===
| Date | Tournament | City | Category | Surface | 2016 result | 2016 points | 2017 points | Outcome |
|---|---|---|---|---|---|---|---|---|
| 1 January 2017– 8 January 2017 | Brisbane International | Brisbane | ATP World Tour 250 | Hard | DNS | 0 | 90 | Semifinals (lost to Kei Nishikori, 6–7^{(3–7)},3–6) |
| 16 January 2017– 29 January 2017 | Australian Open | Melbourne | Grand Slam | Hard | 4R | 180 | 720 | Semifinals (lost to Roger Federer, 5–7, 3–6, 6–1, 6–4, 3–6) |
| 13 February 2017– 19 February 2017 | Rotterdam Open | Rotterdam | ATP World Tour 500 | Hard | N/A | N/A | N/A | Withdrew |
| 20 February 2017– 27 February 2017 | Dubai Tennis Championships | Dubai | ATP World Tour 500 | Hard | W | 500 | 0 | First round (lost to Damir Džumhur, 6–7^{(4–7)}, 3–6) |
| 9 March 2017– 19 March 2017 | Indian Wells Masters | Indian Wells | ATP Masters 1000 | Hard | 4R | 90 | 600 | Final (lost to Roger Federer, 4–6, 5–7) |
| 22 March 2017– 2 April 2017 | Miami Open | Miami | ATP Masters 1000 | Hard | 2R | 10 | 90 | Fourth round (lost to Alexander Zverev, 6–4, 2–6, 1–6) |
| 16 April 2017– 23 April 2017 | Monte-Carlo Masters | Monte-Carlo | ATP Masters 1000 | Clay | QF | 180 | 90 | Third round (lost to Pablo Cuevas, 4–6, 4–6) |
| 7 May 2017– 14 May 2017 | Madrid Open | Madrid | ATP Masters 1000 | Clay | 2R | 10 | 10 | Second round (lost to Benoît Paire, 5–7, 6–4, 2–6) |
| 14 May 2017– 21 May 2017 | Italian Open | Rome | ATP Masters 1000 | Clay | 3R | 90 | 90 | Third round (lost to John Isner, 6–7^{(1–7)}, 4–6) |
| 21 May 2017– 27 May 2017 | Geneva Open | Geneva | ATP World Tour 250 | Clay | W | 250 | 250 | Champion (defeated Mischa Zverev, 4–6, 6–3, 6–3) |
| 28 May 2017– 11 June 2017 | French Open | Paris | Grand Slam | Clay | SF | 720 | 1200 | Final (lost to Rafael Nadal, 2–6, 3–6, 1–6) |
| 19 June 2017– 25 June 2017 | Queen's Club Championships | London | ATP World Tour 500 | Grass | 1R | 0 | 0 | First round (lost to Feliciano López, 6–7^{(4–7)}, 5–7) |
| 3 July 2017– 16 July 2017 | Wimbledon | London | Grand Slam | Grass | 2R | 45 | 10 | First round (lost to Daniil Medvedev, 4–6, 6–3, 4–6, 1–6) |
| 7 August 2017– 13 August 2017 | Canadian Open | Montreal | Masters 1000 | Hard | SF | 360 | N/A | Withdrew |
| 14 August 2017– 20 August 2017 | Cincinnati Masters | Cincinnati | Masters 1000 | Hard | 3R | 90 | N/A | Withdrew |
| 28 August 2017– 10 September 2017 | US Open | New York City | Grand Slam | Hard | W | 2000 | N/A | Withdrew |
| 18 September 2017– 24 September 2017 | St. Petersburg Open | Saint Petersburg | ATP World Tour 250 | Hard (i) | F | 150 | N/A | Withdrew |
| 9 October 2017– 15 October 2017 | Shanghai Masters | Shanghai | Masters 1000 | Hard | 3R | 90 | N/A | Withdrew |
| 23 October 2017– 29 October 2017 | Swiss Indoors | Basel | 500 Series | Hard (i) | QF | 90 | N/A | Withdrew |
| 30 October 2017– 5 November 2017 | Paris Masters | Paris | Masters 1000 | Hard (i) | 2R | 10 | N/A | Withdrew |
| Total year-end points | | | | | | 5315 | 3150 | ▼ -2165 difference |

== Yearly records ==
=== Head-to-head matchups ===
Stan Wawrinka had a 26–11 match win–loss record in the 2017 season. His record against players who were part of the ATP rankings Top Ten at the time of their meetings was 3–3. The following list is ordered by number of wins:

- (Serbia) Viktor Troicki 2–0
- (Spain) Pablo Carreño Busta 1–0
- (Croatia) Marin Čilić 1–0
- (Ukraine) Alexandr Dolgopolov 1–0
- (United Kingdom) Kyle Edmund 1–0
- (Italy) Fabio Fognini 1–0
- (Tunisia) Malek Jaziri 1–0
- (United States) Steve Johnson 1–0
- (Slovakia) Martin Kližan 1–0
- (Germany) Philipp Kohlschreiber 1–0
- (Serbia) Jozef Kovalík 1–0
- (Russia) Andrey Kuznetsov 1–0
- (Italy) Paolo Lorenzi 1–0
- (France) Gael Monfils 1–0
- (United Kingdom) Andy Murray 1–0
- (Japan) Yoshihito Nishioka 1–0
- (United States) Sam Querrey 1–0
- (Italy) Andreas Seppi 1–0
- (Brazil) Rogério Dutra Silva 1–0
- (Austria) Dominic Thiem 1–0
- (France) Jo-Wilfried Tsonga 1–0
- (Czech Republic) Jiří Veselý 1–0
- (Argentina) Horacio Zeballos 1–0
- (Germany) Mischa Zverev 1–0
- (France) Benoît Paire 1–1
- (Uruguay) Pablo Cuevas 0–1
- (Bosnia and Herzegovina) Damir Džumhur 0–1
- (United States) John Isner 0–1
- (Spain) Feliciano López 0–1
- (Russia) Daniil Medvedev 0–1
- (Spain) Rafael Nadal 0–1
- (Japan) Kei Nishikori 0–1
- (Germany) Alexander Zverev 0–1
- (Switzerland) Roger Federer 0–2

=== Finals ===
==== Singles: 3 (1–2) ====
| Category Grand Slam (0–1) ATP World Tour Finals (0–0) ATP World Tour Masters 1000 (0–1) ATP World Tour 500 (0–0) ATP World Tour 250 (1–0) | Titles by surface Hard (0–1) Clay (1–1) Grass (0–0) | Titles by conditions Outdoors (1–2) Indoors (0–0) |

| Result | No. | Date | Category | Tournament | Surface | Opponent | Score |
|---|---|---|---|---|---|---|---|
| Runner-up | 11. | 19 March 2017 | Masters 1000 | Indian Wells Masters, United States | Hard | (Switzerland) Roger Federer | 4–6, 5–7 |
| Winner | 16. | 27 May 2017 | 250 Series | Geneva Open, Switzerland | Clay | (Germany) Mischa Zverev | 4–6, 6–3, 6–3 |
| Runner-up | 12. | 11 June 2017 | Grand Slam | French Open, France | Clay | (Spain) Rafael Nadal | 2–6, 3–6, 1–6 |

=== Earnings ===
- **Bold** font denotes tournament win

| Event | Prize money | Year-to-date |
|---|---|---|
| Brisbane International | $22,245 | $22,245 |
| Australian Open | A$820,000 | $637,081 |
| Dubai Tennis Championships | $17,980 | $655,061 |
| Indian Wells Masters | $573,680 | $1,228,741 |
| Miami Masters | $77,265 | $1,306,006 |
| Monte-Carlo Masters | €53,435 | $1,362,695 |
| Madrid Open | €35,855 | $1,402,114 |
| Italian Open | €53,435 | $1,460,507 |
| **Geneva Open** | €85,945 | $1,556,792 |
| French Open | €1,060,000 | $2,741,448 |
| Queen's Club Championships | €13,595 | $2,756,666 |
| Wimbledon Championships | £35,000 | $2,802,229 |
| | | $2,802,229 |

Figures in United States dollars (USD) unless noted.

== See also ==
- 2017 ATP World Tour
- 2017 Roger Federer tennis season
- 2017 Rafael Nadal tennis season
- 2017 Novak Djokovic tennis season
- 2017 Andy Murray tennis season
