= 2017 Roger Federer tennis season =

Statistics for Swiss tennis player

- Full name: Roger Federer
- Country: Switzerland
- Calendar prize money: $13,054,856

Singles
- Season record: 54–5
- Calendar titles: 7
- Year-end ranking: No. 2
- Ranking change from previous year: ▲14

Grand Slam & significant results
- Australian Open: W
- French Open: A
- Wimbledon: W
- US Open: QF
- Other tournaments
- Tour Finals: SF

Doubles
- Season record: 1–0
- Year-end ranking: Unranked

Mixed doubles
- Season record: 2–1

Injuries
- Injuries: Back injury following Canadian Open

Roger Federer's 2017 tennis season officially commenced on 2 January 2017, with the start of the Hopman Cup, and ended on 18 November 2017, with a loss in the semifinals of the ATP Finals.

This season is regarded by some as one of the greatest comeback seasons of all time. It saw Federer return from an injury shortened 2016 season that saw him drop to world No. 16 in the ATP rankings. This season marked a renaissance and a return to success for Federer, winning two majors, the Australian Open and the Wimbledon Championships, marking the first season since 2009 in which he won multiple majors. Federer won a total of seven titles in the season, the most since 2007, and with a win–loss record of 54–5 his winning percentage was the highest since 2006. With these accomplishments, the season was statistically Federer's most successful in over a decade.

== Year summary ==
=== Early hard court season ===
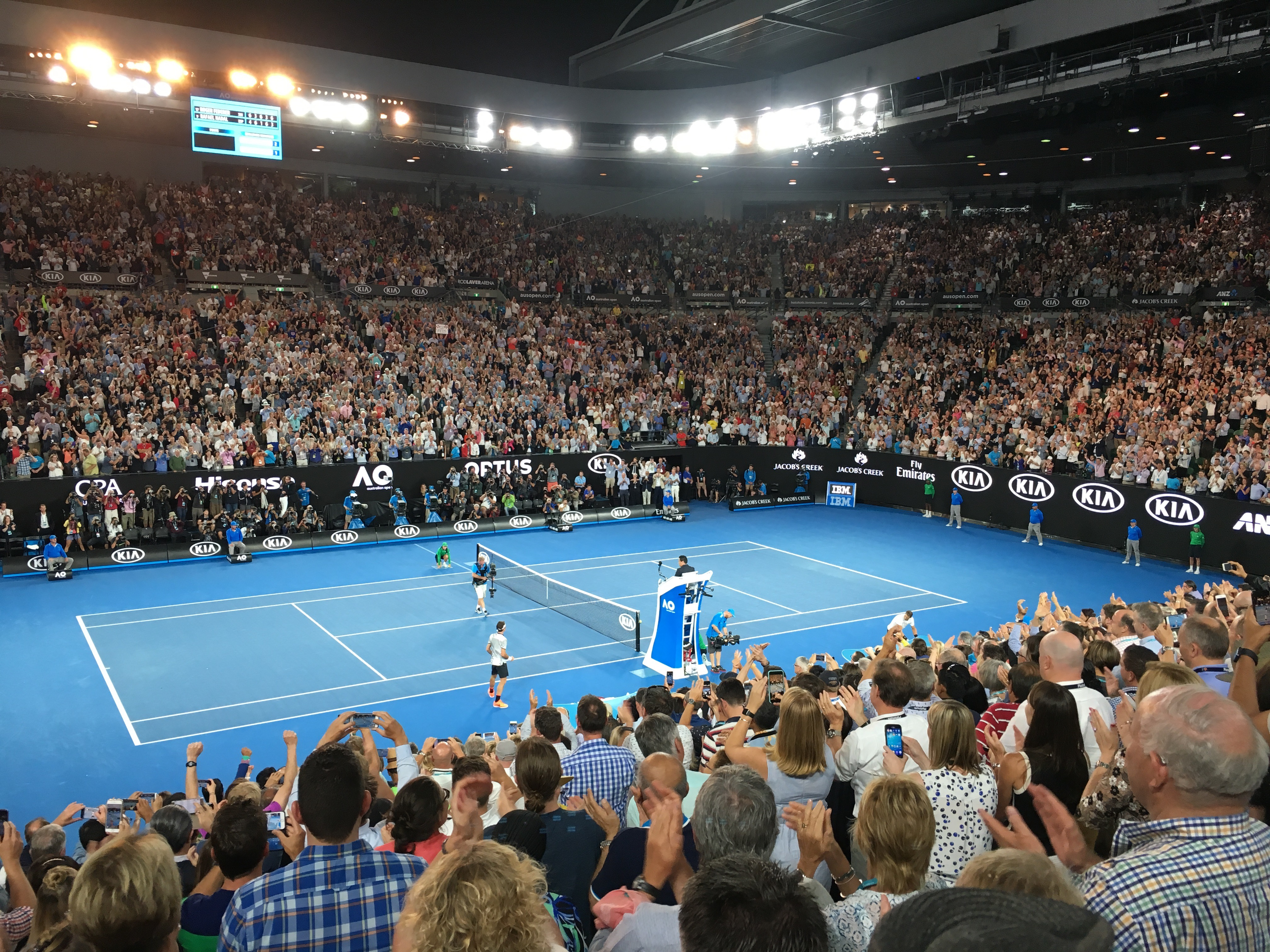
The 2017 Australian Open men's final.

==== Hopman Cup ====
After returning from injury, prior to the Australian Open, Federer paired with Belinda Bencic to compete in the Hopman Cup, representing Switzerland. They were knocked out in the round robin stage after winning two out of three ties. Federer played three singles matches during the event, winning two and losing one against Alexander Zverev.

==== Australian Open ====
In his first major tournament of the year, Federer progressed all the way to the final, winning over top 10 players Tomáš Berdych, Kei Nishikori, and fellow countryman Stan Wawrinka, to face his archrival Rafael Nadal in the final. Nadal had won all six matches between the two in major tournaments since the Wimbledon final of 2007, including all three of their encounters at the Australian Open. Federer ultimately triumphed after being a break down in the fifth set, winning a record-extending and historic 18th men's singles Grand Slam title and becoming the first man to win at least five singles titles at three different major tournaments each, while denying Nadal's second opportunity to become the first man in the Open Era to win each major in men's singles twice. His previous record of winning at least four titles at three majors was also unmatched. Federer's campaign in winning the Australian Open 2017 title saw three of his matches going to five sets (fourth round against Nishikori, semi-final against Wawrinka, and final against Nadal) and the five-set major final was the 7th in Federer's career, which broke the record tie with Björn Borg of a career count of 6 five-set major men's singles finals. With the Australian Open 2017 title, Federer's ATP ranking rose from No. 17 to No. 10 and marked his first win over Nadal in a Grand Slam match outside the grass courts of Wimbledon.

==== Dubai Tennis Championships ====
Upon his return to Dubai, Federer beat Benoît Paire in the first round, but was upset in the second round by world No. 116 and qualifier Evgeny Donskoy in three sets, despite holding three match points in the second set, being up a break in the third set, and being ahead by four points in the third set tiebreak.

==== Indian Wells Masters ====
Federer began the tournament by defeating Stéphane Robert and Steve Johnson in straight sets to set up a meeting with Nadal. Federer won in straight sets, marking the first time he had ever achieved three consecutive wins over the Spaniard. He reached the semifinals with a walkover from Nick Kyrgios due to food poisoning and reached the final after beating Jack Sock in straight sets. He defeated fellow countryman Stan Wawrinka in two sets in the final, to win a record-equaling fifth title in Indian Wells and the 90th title of his career. With this title, Federer's ranking rose from No. 10 to No. 6. This is the seventh time Federer has won a Masters 1000 title without dropping a set, and was only broken once in the entire tournament. At the age of 35, he became the oldest Masters 1000 finalist and winner ever, ahead of Andre Agassi who won the Cincinnati title in 2004 at the age of 34.

==== Miami Open ====
After receiving a bye in the first round, Federer won his first match in Miami in straight sets against teenager Frances Tiafoe. He defeated Juan Martín del Potro and Roberto Bautista Agut in straight sets. In the quarterfinals, he edged Tomáš Berdych in a close match, saving two match points in a third-set tiebreak and successfully avenged his fourth round loss to Berdych at this tournament in 2010. In the semi-final, he defeated Australian Nick Kyrgios in three tie-break sets to set up the final against Rafael Nadal. Federer won the match in two sets, capturing his third Sunshine Double, his fourth consecutive victory over Nadal, and his third Miami title but first since 2006. By doing so, he surpassed his previous record in Indian Wells as the oldest man ever to win a Master's 1000 event. Federer's ranking also improved to world No. 4. After his victory, he decided to take rest by skipping the entire clay court season including the French Open, which he initially planned to play, but eventually decided to skip for the second consecutive year in order to prepare for the grass court season.

=== Grass court season ===
==== Stuttgart Open ====
In his first tour match after winning the Miami final, Federer lost to Tommy Haas in the second round in three sets, having won the first set and held a match point in the second-set tiebreak. This was the first time since the 2002 Wimbledon championships that he had lost his opening match at a grass-court event.

==== Halle Open ====
Federer defeated Yūichi Sugita, Mischa Zverev, Florian Mayer, and Karen Khachanov to reach the final without dropping a set. In the final he defeated Alexander Zverev, securing a record-extending ninth Halle title, and the third which he won without the loss of a set. This made him one of just two men in the Open Era, along with Rafael Nadal, to win the same tournament more than eight times. This title victory also saw Federer equal Nadal's all-time record of 18 ATP 500 titles won.

==== Wimbledon ====
During the first round, Federer advanced when his opponent, Alexandr Dolgopolov, withdrew mid-match due to injury. Still, Federer hit and surpassed the 10000 aces mark in his career during his shortened first round match. He then topped Dušan Lajović, Mischa Zverev, and Grigor Dimitrov, reaching an all-time record 15th Wimbledon quarter-final without the loss of a set. Against Milos Raonic whom he had lost to in the previous year's semifinal, Federer won the match in straight sets with a tiebreaker in the 3rd set to move onto his all-time record 12th Wimbledon semifinal, where he dispatched Tomáš Berdych in straight sets to advance to his 11th Wimbledon final, subsequently setting the record for the highest number of men's singles finals made at a single major. In the final, Federer defeated Marin Čilić in straight sets to win a record 8th Wimbledon Gentleman's singles title, breaking his previous tie with William Renshaw and Pete Sampras, and his 19th Grand Slam singles title overall. He became the second male player in the Open Era to win the championships without dropping a set, after Björn Borg in 1976. Following his victory, he also qualified for the 2017 ATP Finals for a record 15th time along with Rafael Nadal where he's won a record six titles.

=== North American hard court season ===
==== Canadian Open ====
Federer announced that he would return to Montreal for the first time since 2011. Due to the absence of Andy Murray, he was seeded two behind Rafael Nadal, making this the first tournament since 2011 Monte-Carlo Masters where Nadal and Federer were the top two seeds. Federer started his campaign by beating Canadian Peter Polansky in straight sets in the second round. He went on to beat David Ferrer in the third round in 3 sets after recovering from a slow start, improving his career record against Ferrer to 17–0. However, his loss of the first set in that match broke his winning streak of 32 consecutive sets. He defeated Spaniard Roberto Bautista Agut in the quarterfinals in straight sets, improving to 7–0 against Bautista Agut. He defeated Dutchman Robin Haase in the semifinals to book his 6th final of the year. Federer suffered from a recurring back injury in the final, where he lost to Alexander Zverev in straight sets.

==== Cincinnati Masters ====
After losing the Montreal final, he traveled to Cincinnati only to pull out of the event due to a recurring back injury, missing a chance to return to No. 1.

==== US Open ====
Federer would make his return to New York after a back injury he suffered in Montreal. He was seeded third and drawn in the same half as Rafael Nadal, with both chasing the No.1 spot after the tournament. He faced American teenager Frances Tiafoe in the first round and defeated him in five sets; the first time he was taken to five sets in the opening round at the US Open since 2000. He went on to beat Russian Mikhail Youzhny by playing another five set match and improved to 17–0 in head-to-head matches. It is the first time in his career that he has played five-setters in both the first and second rounds of a major tournament. He easily dispatched Spaniard Feliciano López in the third round with a straight sets win to improve his record against him to 13–0. During his victory, Federer moved into second place in the all-time aces list surpassing Croatian Goran Ivanisevic's 10,131 tally. He went on to improve to 12–0 in head-to-head matches by beating German Philipp Kohlschreiber in straight sets to set up an encounter with Argentine Juan Martín del Potro in the quarterfinals, which he lost in 4 sets. After the encounter with del Potro, Federer reiterated that his back was healthy, but stated that he was "not in a safe place" going into the match and explained that his shot accuracy throughout the tournament had not been reliable enough.

=== Asian swing ===
==== Shanghai Masters ====
Federer began his campaign in Shanghai by defeating Diego Schwartzman, Alexandr Dolgopolov, and Richard Gasquet in straight sets. After prevailing in a 3-set semifinal match against Juan Martín del Potro, Federer defeated Rafael Nadal in the final in their fourth encounter of the season to equal Ivan Lendl for the second-most titles of the open era with 94. He beat his great rival for the fifth consecutive time, their 4 encounters in 2017 and the Basel 2015 Final. He also extended his own record as the oldest male player ever to win a Masters 1000 tournament. The win over Nadal was Federer's 350th match won at a Masters 1000 tournament.

=== European indoor hard court season ===
==== Swiss Indoors ====
Upon his return to Basel, Federer defeated Frances Tiafoe and Benoît Paire in straight sets. With this win Federer moved to the quarterfinals where he defeated Adrian Mannarino in three sets, then beat David Goffin in the semis to set up a final clash with Juan Martín del Potro. In the final Federer came from a set down, after losing a closely contested tiebreaker, to win in three sets. It was his 95th career title and his 8th in Basel.

==== Paris Masters ====
Federer was expected to play the Paris Masters, but withdrew before his first match citing a back injury.

==== ATP Finals ====
Federer qualified for the ATP finals as the second seed and won all three of his round-robin matches against Jack Sock, Alexander Zverev, and Marin Čilić. At the semifinals, he was defeated by David Goffin in three sets despite being a set up, ending his 2017 season.

== All matches ==
This table chronicles all the matches of Roger Federer in 2017, including walkovers (W/O) which the ATP does not count as wins or losses.

Key
W	F	SF	QF	#R	RR	Q#	P#	DNQ	A	Z#	PO	G	S	B	NMS	NTI	P	NH

(W) winner; (F) finalist; (SF) semifinalist; (QF) quarterfinalist; (#R) rounds 4, 3, 2, 1; (RR) round-robin stage; (Q#) qualification round; (P#) preliminary round; (DNQ) did not qualify; (A) absent; (Z#) Davis/Fed Cup Zonal Group (with number indication) or (PO) play-off; (G) gold, (S) silver or (B) bronze Olympic/Paralympic medal; (NMS) not a Masters tournament; (NTI) not a Tier I tournament; (P) postponed; (NH) not held; (SR) strike rate (events won / competed); (W–L) win–loss record.

=== Singles matches ===
Tournament	Match	Round	Opponent (seed or key)	Rank	Result	Score
Australian Open; Melbourne, Australia; Grand Slam tournament Hard, outdoor 16 – 29 January 2017
Australian Open; Melbourne, Australia; Grand Slam tournament Hard, outdoor 16 – 29 January 2017	1 / 1326	1R	(Austria) Jürgen Melzer (Q)	300	Win	7–5, 3–6, 6–2, 6–2
Australian Open; Melbourne, Australia; Grand Slam tournament Hard, outdoor 16 – 29 January 2017	2 / 1327	2R	(United States) Noah Rubin (Q)	200	Win	7–5, 6–3, 7–6^{(7–3)}
Australian Open; Melbourne, Australia; Grand Slam tournament Hard, outdoor 16 – 29 January 2017	3 / 1328	3R	(Czech Republic) Tomáš Berdych (10)	10	Win	6–2, 6–4, 6–4
Australian Open; Melbourne, Australia; Grand Slam tournament Hard, outdoor 16 – 29 January 2017	4 / 1330	4R	(Japan) Kei Nishikori (5)	5	Win	6–7^{(4–7)}, 6–4, 6–1, 4–6, 6–3
Australian Open; Melbourne, Australia; Grand Slam tournament Hard, outdoor 16 – 29 January 2017	5 / 1329	QF	(Germany) Mischa Zverev	50	Win	6–1, 7–5, 6–2
Australian Open; Melbourne, Australia; Grand Slam tournament Hard, outdoor 16 – 29 January 2017	6 / 1331	SF	(Switzerland) Stan Wawrinka (4)	4	Win	7–5, 6–3, 1–6, 4–6, 6–3
Australian Open; Melbourne, Australia; Grand Slam tournament Hard, outdoor 16 – 29 January 2017	7 / 1332	W	(Spain) Rafael Nadal (9)	9	Win (1)	6–4, 3–6, 6–1, 3–6, 6–3
Dubai Tennis Championships; Dubai, United Arab Emirates; ATP 500; Hard, outdoor 27 February – 4 March 2017
Dubai Tennis Championships; Dubai, United Arab Emirates; ATP 500; Hard, outdoor 27 February – 4 March 2017	8 / 1333	1R	(France) Benoît Paire	39	Win	6–1, 6–3
Dubai Tennis Championships; Dubai, United Arab Emirates; ATP 500; Hard, outdoor 27 February – 4 March 2017	9 / 1334	2R	(Russia) Evgeny Donskoy (Q)	116	Loss	6–3, 6–7^{(7–9)}, 6–7^{(5–7)}
Indian Wells Masters; Indian Wells, United States; ATP 1000; Hard, outdoor 6 – 19 March 2017
Indian Wells Masters; Indian Wells, United States; ATP 1000; Hard, outdoor 6 – 19 March 2017	–	1R	Bye			
Indian Wells Masters; Indian Wells, United States; ATP 1000; Hard, outdoor 6 – 19 March 2017	10 / 1335	2R	(France) Stéphane Robert	81	Win	6–2, 6–1
Indian Wells Masters; Indian Wells, United States; ATP 1000; Hard, outdoor 6 – 19 March 2017	11 / 1336	3R	(United States) Steve Johnson (24)	27	Win	7–6^{(7–3)}, 7–6^{(7–5)}
Indian Wells Masters; Indian Wells, United States; ATP 1000; Hard, outdoor 6 – 19 March 2017	12 / 1337	4R	(Spain) Rafael Nadal (5)	6	Win	6–2, 6–3
Indian Wells Masters; Indian Wells, United States; ATP 1000; Hard, outdoor 6 – 19 March 2017	–	QF	(Australia) Nick Kyrgios (15)	16	Walkover	N/A
Indian Wells Masters; Indian Wells, United States; ATP 1000; Hard, outdoor 6 – 19 March 2017	13 / 1338	SF	(United States) Jack Sock (17)	18	Win	6–1, 7–6^{(7–4)}
Indian Wells Masters; Indian Wells, United States; ATP 1000; Hard, outdoor 6 – 19 March 2017	14 / 1339	W	(Switzerland) Stan Wawrinka (3)	3	Win (2)	6–4, 7–5
Miami Open; Miami, United States; ATP 1000; Hard, outdoor 20 March – 2 April 2017
Miami Open; Miami, United States; ATP 1000; Hard, outdoor 20 March – 2 April 2017	–	1R	Bye			
Miami Open; Miami, United States; ATP 1000; Hard, outdoor 20 March – 2 April 2017	15 / 1340	2R	(United States) Frances Tiafoe (Q)	101	Win	7–6^{(7–2)}, 6–3
Miami Open; Miami, United States; ATP 1000; Hard, outdoor 20 March – 2 April 2017	16 / 1341	3R	(Argentina) Juan Martín del Potro (29)	34	Win	6–3, 6–4
Miami Open; Miami, United States; ATP 1000; Hard, outdoor 20 March – 2 April 2017	17 / 1342	4R	(Spain) Roberto Bautista Agut (14)	18	Win	7–6^{(7–5)}, 7–6^{(7–4)}
Miami Open; Miami, United States; ATP 1000; Hard, outdoor 20 March – 2 April 2017	18 / 1343	QF	(Czech Republic) Tomáš Berdych (10)	14	Win	6–2, 3–6, 7–6^{(8–6)}
Miami Open; Miami, United States; ATP 1000; Hard, outdoor 20 March – 2 April 2017	19 / 1344	SF	(Australia) Nick Kyrgios (12)	16	Win	7–6^{(11–9)}, 6–7^{(9–11)}, 7–6^{(7–5)}
Miami Open; Miami, United States; ATP 1000; Hard, outdoor 20 March – 2 April 2017	20 / 1345	W	(Spain) Rafael Nadal (5)	7	Win (3)	6–3, 6–4
Stuttgart Open; Stuttgart, Germany; ATP 250; Grass, outdoor 12 – 18 June 2017
Stuttgart Open; Stuttgart, Germany; ATP 250; Grass, outdoor 12 – 18 June 2017	–	1R	Bye			
Stuttgart Open; Stuttgart, Germany; ATP 250; Grass, outdoor 12 – 18 June 2017	21 / 1346	2R	(Germany) Tommy Haas (WC)	302	Loss	6–2, 6–7^{(8–10)}, 4–6
Halle Open; Halle, Germany; ATP 500; Grass, outdoor 19 – 25 June 2017
Halle Open; Halle, Germany; ATP 500; Grass, outdoor 19 – 25 June 2017	22 / 1347	1R	(Japan) Yūichi Sugita (LL)	66	Win	6–3, 6–1
Halle Open; Halle, Germany; ATP 500; Grass, outdoor 19 – 25 June 2017	23 / 1348	2R	(Germany) Mischa Zverev	29	Win	7–6^{(7–4)}, 6–4
Halle Open; Halle, Germany; ATP 500; Grass, outdoor 19 – 25 June 2017	24 / 1349	QF	(Germany) Florian Mayer	134	Win	6–3, 6–4
Halle Open; Halle, Germany; ATP 500; Grass, outdoor 19 – 25 June 2017	25 / 1350	SF	(Russia) Karen Khachanov	38	Win	6–4, 7–6^{(7–5)}
Halle Open; Halle, Germany; ATP 500; Grass, outdoor 19 – 25 June 2017	26 / 1351	W	(Germany) Alexander Zverev (4)	12	Win (4)	6–1, 6–3
Wimbledon Championships; London, United Kingdom; Grand Slam tournament Grass, outdoor 3 – 16 July 2017
Wimbledon Championships; London, United Kingdom; Grand Slam tournament Grass, outdoor 3 – 16 July 2017	27 / 1352	1R	(Ukraine) Alexandr Dolgopolov	84	Win	6–3, 3–0 ret.
Wimbledon Championships; London, United Kingdom; Grand Slam tournament Grass, outdoor 3 – 16 July 2017	28 / 1353	2R	(Serbia) Dušan Lajović	79	Win	7–6^{(7–0)}, 6–3, 6–2
Wimbledon Championships; London, United Kingdom; Grand Slam tournament Grass, outdoor 3 – 16 July 2017	29 / 1354	3R	(Germany) Mischa Zverev (27)	30	Win	7–6^{(7–3)}, 6–4, 6–4
Wimbledon Championships; London, United Kingdom; Grand Slam tournament Grass, outdoor 3 – 16 July 2017	30 / 1355	4R	(Bulgaria) Grigor Dimitrov (13)	11	Win	6–4, 6–2, 6–4
Wimbledon Championships; London, United Kingdom; Grand Slam tournament Grass, outdoor 3 – 16 July 2017	31 / 1356	QF	(Canada) Milos Raonic (6)	7	Win	6–4, 6–2, 7–6^{(7–4)}
Wimbledon Championships; London, United Kingdom; Grand Slam tournament Grass, outdoor 3 – 16 July 2017	32 / 1357	SF	(Czech Republic) Tomáš Berdych (11)	15	Win	7–6^{(7–4)}, 7–6^{(7–4)}, 6–4
Wimbledon Championships; London, United Kingdom; Grand Slam tournament Grass, outdoor 3 – 16 July 2017	33 / 1358	W	(Croatia) Marin Čilić (7)	6	Win (5)	6–3, 6–1, 6–4
Canadian Open; Montreal, Canada; ATP 1000; Hard, outdoor 7 – 13 August 2017
Canadian Open; Montreal, Canada; ATP 1000; Hard, outdoor 7 – 13 August 2017	–	1R	Bye			
Canadian Open; Montreal, Canada; ATP 1000; Hard, outdoor 7 – 13 August 2017	34 / 1359	2R	(Canada) Peter Polansky (WC)	116	Win	6–2, 6–1
Canadian Open; Montreal, Canada; ATP 1000; Hard, outdoor 7 – 13 August 2017	35 / 1360	3R	(Spain) David Ferrer	33	Win	4–6, 6–4, 6–2
Canadian Open; Montreal, Canada; ATP 1000; Hard, outdoor 7 – 13 August 2017	36 / 1361	QF	(Spain) Roberto Bautista Agut (12)	16	Win	6–4, 6–4
Canadian Open; Montreal, Canada; ATP 1000; Hard, outdoor 7 – 13 August 2017	37 / 1362	SF	(Netherlands) Robin Haase	52	Win	6–3, 7–6^{(7–5)}
Canadian Open; Montreal, Canada; ATP 1000; Hard, outdoor 7 – 13 August 2017	38 / 1363	F	(Germany) Alexander Zverev (4)	8	Loss (1)	3–6, 4–6
Cincinnati Masters; Cincinnati, United States; ATP 1000; Hard, outdoor 14 – 20 August 2017
Cincinnati Masters; Cincinnati, United States; ATP 1000; Hard, outdoor 14 – 20 August 2017	Withdrew					
US Open; New York City, United States; Grand Slam tournament Hard, outdoor 28 August – 10 September 2017
US Open; New York City, United States; Grand Slam tournament Hard, outdoor 28 August – 10 September 2017	39 / 1364	1R	(United States) Frances Tiafoe	71	Win	4–6, 6–2, 6–1, 1–6, 6–4
US Open; New York City, United States; Grand Slam tournament Hard, outdoor 28 August – 10 September 2017	40 / 1365	2R	(Russia) Mikhail Youzhny	101	Win	6–1, 6–7^{(3–7)}, 4–6, 6–4, 6–2
US Open; New York City, United States; Grand Slam tournament Hard, outdoor 28 August – 10 September 2017	41 / 1366	3R	(Spain) Feliciano López (31)	35	Win	6–3, 6–3, 7–5
US Open; New York City, United States; Grand Slam tournament Hard, outdoor 28 August – 10 September 2017	42 / 1367	4R	(Germany) Philipp Kohlschreiber (33)	37	Win	6–4, 6–2, 7–5
US Open; New York City, United States; Grand Slam tournament Hard, outdoor 28 August – 10 September 2017	43 / 1368	QF	(Argentina) Juan Martín del Potro (24)	28	Loss	5–7, 6–3, 6–7^{(8–10)}, 4–6
Laver Cup; Prague, Czech Republic; Laver Cup; Hard, indoor 22 – 24 September 2017
Laver Cup; Prague, Czech Republic; Laver Cup; Hard, indoor 22 – 24 September 2017	44 / 1369	Day 2	(United States) Sam Querrey	16	Win	6–4, 6–2
Laver Cup; Prague, Czech Republic; Laver Cup; Hard, indoor 22 – 24 September 2017	45 / 1370	Day 3	(Australia) Nick Kyrgios	20	Win	4–6, 7–6^{(8–6)}, [11–9]
Shanghai Masters; Shanghai, China; ATP 1000; Hard, outdoor 9 – 15 October 2017
Shanghai Masters; Shanghai, China; ATP 1000; Hard, outdoor 9 – 15 October 2017	–	1R	Bye			
Shanghai Masters; Shanghai, China; ATP 1000; Hard, outdoor 9 – 15 October 2017	46 / 1371	2R	(Argentina) Diego Schwartzman	26	Win	7–6^{(7–4)}, 6–4
Shanghai Masters; Shanghai, China; ATP 1000; Hard, outdoor 9 – 15 October 2017	47 / 1372	3R	(Ukraine) Alexandr Dolgopolov (Q)	41	Win	6–4, 6–2
Shanghai Masters; Shanghai, China; ATP 1000; Hard, outdoor 9 – 15 October 2017	48 / 1373	QF	(France) Richard Gasquet	31	Win	7–5, 6–4
Shanghai Masters; Shanghai, China; ATP 1000; Hard, outdoor 9 – 15 October 2017	49 / 1374	SF	(Argentina) Juan Martín del Potro (16)	23	Win	3–6, 6–3, 6–3
Shanghai Masters; Shanghai, China; ATP 1000; Hard, outdoor 9 – 15 October 2017	50 / 1375	W	(Spain) Rafael Nadal (1)	1	Win (6)	6–4, 6–3
Swiss Indoors; Basel, Switzerland; ATP 500; Hard, indoor 23 – 29 October 2017
Swiss Indoors; Basel, Switzerland; ATP 500; Hard, indoor 23 – 29 October 2017	51 / 1376	1R	(United States) Frances Tiafoe (WC)	76	Win	6–1, 6–3
Swiss Indoors; Basel, Switzerland; ATP 500; Hard, indoor 23 – 29 October 2017	52 / 1377	2R	(France) Benoît Paire	40	Win	6–1, 6–3
Swiss Indoors; Basel, Switzerland; ATP 500; Hard, indoor 23 – 29 October 2017	53 / 1378	QF	(France) Adrian Mannarino (7)	28	Win	4–6, 6–1, 6–3
Swiss Indoors; Basel, Switzerland; ATP 500; Hard, indoor 23 – 29 October 2017	54 / 1379	SF	(Belgium) David Goffin (3)	10	Win	6–1, 6–2
Swiss Indoors; Basel, Switzerland; ATP 500; Hard, indoor 23 – 29 October 2017	55 / 1380	W	(Argentina) Juan Martín del Potro (4)	19	Win (7)	6–7^{(5–7)}, 6–4, 6–3
Paris Masters; Paris, France; ATP 1000; Hard, indoor 30 October – 5 November 2017
Paris Masters; Paris, France; ATP 1000; Hard, indoor 30 October – 5 November 2017	Withdrew					
ATP Finals; London, United Kingdom; ATP Finals; Hard, indoor 12 – 19 November 2017
ATP Finals; London, United Kingdom; ATP Finals; Hard, indoor 12 – 19 November 2017	56 / 1381	RR	(United States) Jack Sock (8)	9	Win	6–4, 7–6^{(7–4)}
ATP Finals; London, United Kingdom; ATP Finals; Hard, indoor 12 – 19 November 2017	57 / 1382	RR	(Germany) Alexander Zverev (3)	3	Win	7–6^{(8–6)}, 5–7, 6–1
ATP Finals; London, United Kingdom; ATP Finals; Hard, indoor 12 – 19 November 2017	58 / 1383	RR	(Croatia) Marin Čilić (5)	5	Win	6–7^{(5–7)}, 6–4, 6–1
ATP Finals; London, United Kingdom; ATP Finals; Hard, indoor 12 – 19 November 2017	59 / 1384	SF	(Belgium) David Goffin (7)	8	Loss	6–2, 3–6, 4–6

=== Doubles matches ===
Tournament	Match	Round	Opponents (seed or key)	Ranks	Result	Score
Laver Cup; Prague, Czech Republic; Laver Cup; Hard, indoor 22 – 24 September 2017; Partner: (Spain) Rafael Nadal
Laver Cup; Prague, Czech Republic; Laver Cup; Hard, indoor 22 – 24 September 2017; Partner: (Spain) Rafael Nadal	1 / 219	Day 2	(United States) Sam Querrey / (United States) Jack Sock	76 / 25	Win	6–4, 1–6, [10–5]

=== Hopman Cup matches ===
==== Singles ====
Tournament	Match	Round	Opponent (seed or key)	Rank	Result	Score
Hopman Cup; Perth, Australia; Hopman Cup; Hard, indoor 1 – 7 January 2017
Hopman Cup; Perth, Australia; Hopman Cup; Hard, indoor 1 – 7 January 2017	1 / 15	RR	(United Kingdom) Daniel Evans	66	Win	6–3, 6–4
Hopman Cup; Perth, Australia; Hopman Cup; Hard, indoor 1 – 7 January 2017	3 / 17	RR	(Germany) Alexander Zverev	24	Loss	6–7^{(1–7)}, 7–6^{(7–4)}, 6–7^{(4–7)}
Hopman Cup; Perth, Australia; Hopman Cup; Hard, indoor 1 – 7 January 2017	5 / 19	RR	(France) Richard Gasquet	18	Win	6–1, 6–4

==== Mixed doubles ====
Tournament	Match	Round	Opponents (seed or key)	Ranks	Result	Score
Hopman Cup; Perth, Australia; Hopman Cup; Hard, indoor 1 – 7 January 2017; Partner: (Switzerland) Belinda Bencic
Hopman Cup; Perth, Australia; Hopman Cup; Hard, indoor 1 – 7 January 2017; Partner: (Switzerland) Belinda Bencic	2 / 16	RR	(United Kingdom) Heather Watson / (United Kingdom) Daniel Evans	– / –	Win	4–0, 4–1
Hopman Cup; Perth, Australia; Hopman Cup; Hard, indoor 1 – 7 January 2017; Partner: (Switzerland) Belinda Bencic	4 / 18	RR	(Germany) Andrea Petkovic / (Germany) Alexander Zverev	– / –	Win	4–1, 4–2
Hopman Cup; Perth, Australia; Hopman Cup; Hard, indoor 1 – 7 January 2017; Partner: (Switzerland) Belinda Bencic	6 / 20	RR	(France) Kristina Mladenovic / (France) Richard Gasquet	– / –	Loss	2–4, 2–4

== Exhibition matches ==
=== Singles ===
Tournament	Match	Round	Opponent (seed or key)	Rank	Result	Score
Match for Africa 3 and 4 Zürich, Switzerland; Seattle, United States; Exhibition; Hard, indoor 10 and 29 April 2017
Match for Africa 3 and 4 Zürich, Switzerland; Seattle, United States; Exhibition; Hard, indoor 10 and 29 April 2017	1	–	(United Kingdom) Andy Murray	1	Win	6–3, 7–6^{(8–6)}
Match for Africa 3 and 4 Zürich, Switzerland; Seattle, United States; Exhibition; Hard, indoor 10 and 29 April 2017	3	–	(United States) John Isner	24	Win	6–4, 7–6^{(9–7)}
Match for UNICEF; Glasgow, Scotland; Exhibition; Hard, indoor 7 November 2017
Match for UNICEF; Glasgow, Scotland; Exhibition; Hard, indoor 7 November 2017	1	–	(United Kingdom) Andy Murray	16	Win	6–3, 3–6, [10–6]

=== Doubles ===
Tournament	Match	Round	Opponents (seed or key)	Ranks	Result	Score
Match for Africa 4 Seattle, United States; Exhibition; Hard, indoor 29 April 2017; Partner: (United States) Bill Gates
Match for Africa 4 Seattle, United States; Exhibition; Hard, indoor 29 April 2017; Partner: (United States) Bill Gates	2	–	(United States) John Isner / (United States) Mike McCready	54 / –	Win	6–4

== Schedule ==
=== Singles schedule ===
Date	Tournament	Location	Category	Surface	Prev. result	Prev. points	New points	Result
16 January 2017– 29 January 2017	Australian Open	Melbourne (AUS)	Grand Slam	Hard	SF	720	2000	Champion (defeated Rafael Nadal, 6–4, 3–6, 6–1, 3–6, 6–3)
27 February 2017– 4 March 2017	Dubai Tennis Championships	Dubai (UAE)	500 Series	Hard	A	N/A	45	Second round (lost to Evgeny Donskoy, 6–3, 6–7^{(7–9)}, 6–7^{(5–7)})
6 March 2017– 19 March 2017	Indian Wells Masters	Indian Wells (USA)	Masters 1000	Hard	A	N/A	1000	Champion (defeated Stan Wawrinka, 6–4, 7–5)
20 March 2017– 2 April 2017	Miami Open	Miami (USA)	Masters 1000	Hard	A	N/A	1000	Champion (defeated Rafael Nadal, 6–3, 6–4)
12 June 2017– 18 June 2017	Stuttgart Open	Stuttgart (GER)	250 Series	Grass	SF	90	0	Second round (lost to Tommy Haas, 6–2, 6–7^{(8–10)}, 4–6)
19 June 2017– 25 June 2017	Halle Open	Halle (GER)	500 Series	Grass	SF	180	500	Champion (defeated Alexander Zverev, 6–1, 6–3)
3 July 2017– 16 July 2017	Wimbledon	London (GBR)	Grand Slam	Grass	SF	720	2000	Champion (defeated Marin Čilić, 6–3, 6–1, 6–4)
7 August 2017– 13 August 2017	Canadian Open	Montreal (CAN)	Masters 1000	Hard	A	N/A	600	Final (lost to Alexander Zverev, 3–6, 4–6)
14 August 2017– 20 August 2017	Cincinnati Masters	Cincinnati (USA)	Masters 1000	Hard	A	N/A	N/A	Withdrew due to back injury
28 August 2017– 10 September 2017	US Open	New York (USA)	Grand Slam	Hard	A	N/A	360	Quarterfinals (lost to Juan Martín del Potro, 5–7, 6–3, 6–7^{(8–10)}, 4–6)
22 September 2017– 24 September 2017	Laver Cup	Prague (CZE)	Laver Cup	Hard (i)	N/A	N/A	N/A	Europe defeated World, 15–9
8 October 2017– 15 October 2017	Shanghai Masters	Shanghai (CHN)	Masters 1000	Hard	A	N/A	1000	Champion (defeated Rafael Nadal, 6–4, 6–3)
23 October 2017– 29 October 2017	Swiss Indoors	Basel (SUI)	500 Series	Hard (i)	A	N/A	500	Champion (defeated Juan Martín del Potro, 6–7^{(5–7)}, 6–4, 6–3)
30 October 2017– 5 November 2017	Paris Masters	Paris (FRA)	Masters 1000	Hard (i)	A	N/A	N/A	Withdrew due to back injury
12 November 2017– 19 November 2017	ATP Finals	London (GBR)	Tour Finals	Hard (i)	DNQ	N/A	600	Semifinals (lost to David Goffin, 6–2, 3–6, 4–6)
Total year-end points						2130	9605	▲7475 difference

=== Doubles schedule ===
Date	Tournament	Location	Category	Surface	Prev. result	Prev. points	New points	Result
22 September 2017– 24 September 2017	Laver Cup	Prague (CZE)	Laver Cup	Hard (i)	N/A	N/A	N/A	Europe defeated World, 15–9
Total year-end points						0	0	0 difference

== Yearly records ==
=== Head-to-head matchups ===
==== ATP and Grand Slam sanctioned matches ====
Roger Federer has a 54–5 ATP match win–loss record in the 2017 season. His record against players who were part of the ATP rankings Top Ten at the time of their meetings is 14–2. Bold indicates player was ranked top 10 at time of at least one meeting. The following list is ordered by number of wins:

- (Spain) **Rafael Nadal** 4–0
- (Czech Republic) **Tomáš Berdych** 3–0
- (United States) Frances Tiafoe 3–0
- (Germany) Mischa Zverev 3–0
- (Argentina) Juan Martín del Potro 3–1
- (Spain) Roberto Bautista Agut 2–0
- (Croatia) **Marin Čilić** 2–0
- (Ukraine) Alexandr Dolgopolov 2–0
- (Australia) Nick Kyrgios 2–0
- (France) Benoît Paire 2–0
- (United States) **Jack Sock** 2–0
- (Switzerland) **Stan Wawrinka** 2–0
- (Germany) **Alexander Zverev** 2–1
- (Bulgaria) Grigor Dimitrov 1–0
- (Spain) David Ferrer 1–0
- (France) Richard Gasquet 1–0
- (Netherlands) Robin Haase 1–0
- (United States) Steve Johnson 1–0
- (Russia) Karen Khachanov 1–0
- (Germany) Philipp Kohlschreiber 1–0
- (Serbia) Dušan Lajović 1–0
- (Spain) Feliciano López 1–0
- (France) Adrian Mannarino 1–0
- (Germany) Florian Mayer 1–0
- (Austria) Jürgen Melzer 1–0
- (Japan) **Kei Nishikori** 1–0
- (Canada) Peter Polansky 1–0
- (United States) Sam Querrey 1–0
- (Canada) **Milos Raonic** 1–0
- (France) Stéphane Robert 1–0
- (United States) Noah Rubin 1–0
- (Argentina) Diego Schwartzman 1–0
- (Japan) Yūichi Sugita 1–0
- (Russia) Mikhail Youzhny 1–0
- (Belgium) **David Goffin** 1–1
- (Russia) Evgeny Donskoy 0–1
- (Germany) Tommy Haas 0–1

==== ITF sanctioned matches ====
His official ITF sanctioned season record for 2017 is 56–6. While these are official sanctioned matches per the ITF, the ATP does not count them in their totals. Bold indicates player was ranked top 10 at time of at least one meeting. The extra ITF matches are as follows:

- (United Kingdom) Daniel Evans 1–0
- (France) Richard Gasquet 1–0
- (Germany) Alexander Zverev 0–1

=== Finals ===
==== Singles: 8 (7 titles, 1 runner-up) ====
Category Grand Slam (2–0) ATP Finals (0–0) ATP World Tour Masters 1000 (3–1) ATP World Tour 500 (2–0) ATP World Tour 250 (0–0)	Titles by surface Hard (5–1) Clay (0–0) Grass (2–0)	Titles by setting Outdoor (6–1) Indoor (1–0)

Result	W–L	Date	Tournament	Tier	Surface	Opponent	Score
Win	1–0	Jan 2017	Australian Open, Australia (5)	Grand Slam	Hard	(Spain) Rafael Nadal	6–4, 3–6, 6–1, 3–6, 6–3
Win	2–0	Mar 2017	Indian Wells Masters, United States (5)	Masters 1000	Hard	(Switzerland) Stan Wawrinka	6–4, 7–5
Win	3–0	Apr 2017	Miami Open, United States (3)	Masters 1000	Hard	(Spain) Rafael Nadal	6–3, 6–4
Win	4–0	Jun 2017	Halle Open, Germany (9)	500 Series	Grass	(Germany) Alexander Zverev	6–1, 6–3
Win	5–0	Jul 2017	Wimbledon, United Kingdom (8)	Grand Slam	Grass	(Croatia) Marin Čilić	6–3, 6–1, 6–4
Loss	5–1	Aug 2017	Canadian Open, Canada	Masters 1000	Hard	(Germany) Alexander Zverev	3–6, 4–6
Win	6–1	Oct 2017	Shanghai Masters, China (2)	Masters 1000	Hard	(Spain) Rafael Nadal	6–4, 6–3
Win	7–1	Oct 2017	Swiss Indoors, Switzerland (8)	500 Series	Hard (i)	(Argentina) Juan Martín del Potro	6–7^{(5–7)}, 6–4, 6–3

==== Team competitions: 1 (1 title) ====
Result	W–L	Date	Tournament	Tier	Surface	Partners	Opponents	Score
Win	1–0	Sep 2017	Laver Cup, Czech Republic	Laver Cup	Hard (i)	(Spain) Rafael Nadal (Germany) Alexander Zverev (Austria) Dominic Thiem (Croatia) Marin Čilić (Czech Republic) Tomáš Berdych	(United States) Sam Querrey (United States) John Isner (Australia) Nick Kyrgios (United States) Jack Sock (Canada) Denis Shapovalov (United States) Frances Tiafoe	15–9

=== Earnings ===
- **Bold** font denotes tournament win

Event	Prize money	Year-to-date
**Australian Open**	A$3,700,000	$2,774,260
Dubai Tennis Championships	$34,100	$2,808,360
**Indian Wells Masters**	$1,175,505	$3,983,865
**Miami Open**	$1,175,505	$5,159,370
Stuttgart Open	€10,770	$5,171,424
**Halle Open**	€395,690	$5,614,360
**Wimbledon**	£2,200,000	$8,478,320
Canadian Open	$438,635	$8,916,955
US Open	$470,000	$9,386,955
**Shanghai Masters**	$1,136,850	$10,523,805
**Swiss Indoors**	€395,850	$11,022,856
ATP Finals	$764,000	$11,786,856
Bonus pool	$1,200,000	$13,054,856
		$13,054,856

Figures in United States dollars (USD) unless noted.

=== Awards ===
- Comeback Player of the Year
- Stefan Edberg Sportsmanship Award
  - Record thirteenth award in career (seventh consecutive)
- ATPWorldTour.com Fans' Favourite
  - Record fifteenth consecutive award in career
- BBC Overseas Sports Personality of the Year
  - Record fourth award in career
- Laureus World Sports Award for Sportsman of the Year (2018)
  - Record fifth award in career
- Laureus World Sports Award for Comeback of the Year (2018)

== See also ==
- 2017 ATP World Tour
- 2017 Novak Djokovic tennis season
- 2017 Andy Murray tennis season
- 2017 Rafael Nadal tennis season
- 2017 Stan Wawrinka tennis season
