= 2017 Qatar ExxonMobil Open =

- Date: 2–7 January
- Edition: 25th
- Category: ATP World Tour 250 series
- Draw: 32S/16D
- Surface: Hard / outdoor
- Location: Doha, Qatar

Champions

Singles
- (Serbia) Novak Djokovic

Doubles
- (France) Jérémy Chardy / (France) Fabrice Martin
← 2016 ·	ATP Qatar Open	· 2018 →

The 2017 Qatar Open (also known as 2017 Qatar ExxonMobil Open for sponsorship reasons) was a men's tennis tournament played on outdoor hard courts. It was the 25th edition of the Qatar Open, and part of the ATP World Tour 250 series of the 2017 ATP World Tour. It took place at the Khalifa International Tennis and Squash Complex in Doha, Qatar, from 2 January until 7 January 2017. Second-seeded Novak Djokovic won his second consecutive singles title at the event.

== Finals ==
=== Singles ===
(Serbia) Novak Djokovic defeated (United Kingdom) Andy Murray, 6–3, 5–7, 6–4

- It was Djokovic's 1st singles title of the year and the 67th of his career.

=== Doubles ===
(France) Jérémy Chardy / (France) Fabrice Martin defeated (Canada) Vasek Pospisil / (Czech Republic) Radek Štěpánek, 6–4, 7–6^{(7–3)}

== Points and prize money ==
=== Point distribution ===
Event	W	F	SF	QF	Round of 16	Round of 32	Q	Q2	Q1
Singles	250	150	90	45	20	0	12	6	0
Doubles	250	150	90	45	0	—	—	—	—

=== Prize money ===
Event	W	F	SF	QF	Round of 16	Round of 32	Q2	Q1
Singles	$209,665	$110,420	$59,810	$34,080	$20,080	$11,895	$5,355	$2,675
Doubles	$67,140	$35,300	$19,130	$10,940	$6,410	—	—	—
Doubles prize money per team

== Singles main-draw entrants ==
=== Seeds ===
Country	Player	Rank^{1}	Seed
GBR	Andy Murray	1	1
SRB	Novak Djokovic	2	2
CZE	Tomáš Berdych	10	3
BEL	David Goffin	11	4
FRA	Jo-Wilfried Tsonga	12	5
CRO	Ivo Karlović	20	6
GER	Philipp Kohlschreiber	32	7
CYP	Marcos Baghdatis	36	8

- ^{1} Rankings as of December 26, 2016

=== Other entrants ===
The following players received wildcards into the singles main draw:

- (Belgium) Arthur De Greef
- (Turkey) Anıl Yüksel
- (Qatar) Mubarak Shannan Zayid

The following players received entry from the qualifying draw:

- (Italy) Alessandro Giannessi
- (Canada) Vasek Pospisil
- (Egypt) Mohamed Safwat
- (Czech Republic) Radek Štěpánek

== Doubles main-draw entrants ==
=== Seeds ===
Country	Player	Country	Player	Rank^{1}	Seed
GBR	Jamie Murray	BRA	Bruno Soares	7	1
CRO	Mate Pavić	AUT	Alexander Peya	52	2
CAN	Vasek Pospisil	CZE	Radek Štěpánek	58	3
GBR	Dominic Inglot	ROM	Florin Mergea	69	4

- ^{1} Rankings as of December 26, 2016

=== Other entrants ===
The following pairs received wildcards into the doubles main draw:

- (Tunisia) Malek Jaziri / (Qatar) Mubarak Shannan Zayid
- (Qatar) Jabor Al-Mutawa / (Qatar) Mousa Shanan Zayed
