= 2017 Italian Open (tennis) =

- Date: 15–21 May
- Edition: 74th
- Category: Masters 1000; Premier 5
- Draw: 56S / 24D (men); 56S / 28D (women)
- Prize money: €4,273,775 (men) $3,076,495 (women)
- Surface: Clay / outdoor
- Location: Rome, Italy
- Venue: Foro Italico

Champions

Men's singles
- (Germany) Alexander Zverev

Women's singles
- (Ukraine) Elina Svitolina

Men's doubles
- (France) Pierre-Hugues Herbert / (France) Nicolas Mahut

Women's doubles
- (Chinese Taipei) Chan Yung-jan / (Switzerland) Martina Hingis
← 2016 ·	Italian Open	· 2018 →

The 2017 Italian Open (also known as the 2017 Rome Masters and the sponsored title 2017 Internazionali BNL d'Italia) was a tennis tournament played on outdoor clay courts at the Foro Italico in Rome, Italy. It was the 74th edition of the Italian Open and is classified as an ATP World Tour Masters 1000 event on the 2017 ATP World Tour and a Premier 5 event on the 2017 WTA Tour. It took place from 15 to 21 May 2017.

== Finals ==
=== Men's singles ===
- (Germany) Alexander Zverev defeated (Serbia) Novak Djokovic 6–4, 6–3

=== Women's singles ===
- (Ukraine) Elina Svitolina defeated (Romania) Simona Halep, 4–6, 7–5, 6–1

=== Men's doubles ===
- (France) Pierre-Hugues Herbert / (France) Nicolas Mahut defeated (Croatia) Ivan Dodig / (Spain) Marcel Granollers, 4–6, 6–4, [10–3]

=== Women's doubles ===
- (Chinese Taipei) Chan Yung-jan / (Switzerland) Martina Hingis defeated (Russia) Ekaterina Makarova / (Russia) Elena Vesnina, 7–5, 7–6^{(7–4)}

== Points and prize money ==
=== Point distribution ===
Event	W	F	SF	QF	Round of 16	Round of 32	Round of 64	Q	Q2	Q1
Men's singles	1000	600	360	180	90	45	10	25	16	0
Men's doubles	1000	600	360	180	90	0	—	—	—	—
Women's singles	900	585	350	190	105	60	1	30	20	1
Women's doubles	900	585	350	190	105	1	—	—	—	—

=== Prize money ===
Event	W	F	SF	QF	Round of 16	Round of 32	Round of 64	Q2	Q1
Men's singles	€820,035	€402,080	€202,365	€102,900	€53,435	€28,170	€15,210	€3,505	€1,785
Women's singles	€461,355	€230,565	€115,170	€53,055	€26,302	€13,501	€6,939	€3,860	€1,987
Men's doubles	€253,950	€124,330	€62,360	€32,010	€16,550	€8,730	—	—	—
Women's doubles	€132,074	€66,710	€33,020	€16,620	€8,395	€4,160	—	—	—

== ATP main-draw entrants ==
=== Singles ===
==== Seeds ====
The following are the seeded players. Seedings are based on ATP rankings as of 8 May 2017. Rankings and points before are as of 15 May 2017.

Because the tournament took place one week later than in 2016, the points defended from last year was not superseded within a 52-week run, the results during the 52-week period were from 2016 Geneva Open and 2016 Open de Nice Côte d'Azur.

Seed	Rank	Player	Points before	Points defending	Points won	Points after	Status
1	1	(United Kingdom) Andy Murray	10,360	0	10	10,370	Second round lost to (Italy) Fabio Fognini
2	2	(Serbia) Novak Djokovic	6,845	0	600	7,445	Runner-up, lost to (Germany) Alexander Zverev [16]
3	3	(Switzerland) Stan Wawrinka	5,605	250	90	5,445	Third round lost to (United States) John Isner
4	4	(Spain) Rafael Nadal	5,195	0	180	5,375	Quarterfinals lost to (Austria) Dominic Thiem [8]
5	6	(Canada) Milos Raonic	4,180	0	180	4,360	Quarterfinals lost to (Germany) Alexander Zverev [16]
6	8	(Croatia) Marin Čilić	3,735	150	180	3,765	Quarterfinals lost to (United States) John Isner
7	9	(Japan) Kei Nishikori	3,470	0	90	3,560	Third round lost to (Argentina) Juan Martín del Potro
8	7	(Austria) Dominic Thiem	4,035	250	360	4,145	Semifinals lost to (Serbia) Novak Djokovic [2]
9	10	(Belgium) David Goffin	3,055	(90)	90	3,055	Third round lost to (Croatia) Marin Čilić [6]
10	11	(Bulgaria) Grigor Dimitrov	2,900	(10)	10	2,900	First round lost to (Argentina) Juan Martín del Potro
11	16	(France) Lucas Pouille	2,330	(20)	10	2,320	First round lost to (United States) Sam Querrey
12	13	(Czech Republic) Tomáš Berdych	2,690	0	90	2,780	Third round lost to (Canada) Milos Raonic [5]
13	14	(United States) Jack Sock	2,370	(45)	90	2,415	Third round lost to (Spain) Rafael Nadal [4]
14	19	(Spain) Albert Ramos Viñolas	2,145	(90)	10	2,065	First round lost to (United States) John Isner
15	21	(Spain) Pablo Carreño Busta	2,090	(90)^{†}	45	2,045	Second round lost to (Spain) Roberto Bautista Agut
16	17	(Germany) Alexander Zverev	2,300	150	1,000	3,150	Champion, defeated (Serbia) Novak Djokovic [2]

† The player did not qualify for the tournament in 2016. Accordingly, points for his 18th best result are deducted instead.

==== Other entrants ====
The following players received wildcards into the main draw:

- (Italy) Matteo Berrettini
- (Italy) Gianluca Mager
- (Italy) Stefano Napolitano
- (Italy) Andreas Seppi

The following player received entry using a protected ranking:

- (Germany) Tommy Haas

The following players received entry from the qualifying draw:

- (Spain) Nicolás Almagro
- (South Africa) Kevin Anderson
- (United Kingdom) Aljaž Bedene
- (Argentina) Carlos Berlocq
- (France) Adrian Mannarino
- (Brazil) Thiago Monteiro
- (Germany) Jan-Lennard Struff

The following players received entry as lucky losers:

- (Brazil) Thomaz Bellucci
- (Ukraine) Alexandr Dolgopolov
- (United States) Jared Donaldson
- (United States) Ernesto Escobedo

==== Withdrawals ====
Before the tournament

- (Cyprus) Marcos Baghdatis →replaced by (United States) Jared Donaldson
- (Switzerland) Roger Federer →replaced by (United Kingdom) Dan Evans
- (France) Richard Gasquet →replaced by (Germany) Florian Mayer
- (United States) Steve Johnson →replaced by (United Kingdom) Kyle Edmund
- (Croatia) Ivo Karlović →replaced by (United States) Ernesto Escobedo
- (Germany) Philipp Kohlschreiber →replaced by (Brazil) Thomaz Bellucci
- (Australia) Nick Kyrgios →replaced by (Ukraine) Alexandr Dolgopolov
- (Italy) Paolo Lorenzi →replaced by (France) Nicolas Mahut
- (France) Gaël Monfils →replaced by (Netherlands) Robin Haase
- (Luxembourg) Gilles Müller →replaced by (United States) Ryan Harrison
- (France) Jo-Wilfried Tsonga →replaced by (Czech Republic) Jiří Veselý

==== Retirements ====
- (Spain) Nicolás Almagro
- (Italy) Gianluca Mager

=== Doubles ===
==== Seeds ====
Country	Player	Country	Player	Rank^{1}	Seed
FIN	Henri Kontinen	AUS	John Peers	3	1
USA	Bob Bryan	USA	Mike Bryan	6	2
GBR	Jamie Murray	BRA	Bruno Soares	15	3
FRA	Pierre-Hugues Herbert	FRA	Nicolas Mahut	17	4
POL	Łukasz Kubot	BRA	Marcelo Melo	17	5
RSA	Raven Klaasen	USA	Rajeev Ram	21	6
ESP	Feliciano López	ESP	Marc López	28	7
CRO	Ivan Dodig	ESP	Marcel Granollers	30	8

- Rankings are as of May 8, 2017.

==== Other entrants ====
The following pairs received wildcards into the doubles main draw:

- (Italy) Simone Bolelli / (Italy) Andreas Seppi
- (Italy) Federico Gaio / (Italy) Stefano Napolitano

The following pair received entry as alternates:

- (Philippines) Treat Huey / (New Zealand) Michael Venus

==== Withdrawals ====
Before the tournament

- (Australia) Nick Kyrgios

== WTA main-draw entrants ==
=== Singles ===
==== Seeds ====
Country	Player	Rank^{1}	Seed
GER	Angelique Kerber	2	1
CZE	Karolína Plíšková	3	2
ESP	Garbiñe Muguruza	4	3
SVK	Dominika Cibulková	5	4
GBR	Johanna Konta	6	5
ROU	Simona Halep	7	6
RUS	Svetlana Kuznetsova	9	7
UKR	Elina Svitolina	10	8
USA	Venus Williams	12	9
USA	Madison Keys	13	10
RUS	Elena Vesnina	14	11
RUS	Anastasia Pavlyuchenkova	16	12
FRA	Kristina Mladenovic	17	13
CZE	Barbora Strýcová	18	14
NED	Kiki Bertens	19	15
CRO	Mirjana Lučić-Baroni	21	16

- Rankings are as of May 8, 2017.

==== Other entrants ====
The following players received wildcards into the main draw:

- (Italy) Deborah Chiesa
- (Italy) Sara Errani
- (Russia) Maria Sharapova

The following players received entry from the qualifying draw:

- (Germany) Mona Barthel
- (United States) Catherine Bellis
- (Australia) Daria Gavrilova
- (Estonia) Anett Kontaveit
- (Latvia) Jeļena Ostapenko
- (Germany) Andrea Petkovic
- (Croatia) Donna Vekić
- (China) Wang Qiang

==== Withdrawals ====
Before the tournament

- (Croatia) Ana Konjuh →replaced by (Kazakhstan) Yaroslava Shvedova
- (Poland) Agnieszka Radwańska →replaced by (Romania) Monica Niculescu
- (United States) CoCo Vandeweghe →replaced by (Japan) Misaki Doi
- (Denmark) Caroline Wozniacki →replaced by (Japan) Naomi Osaka

==== Retirements ====
- (Russia) Daria Kasatkina
- (Spain) Garbiñe Muguruza
- (Russia) Maria Sharapova

=== Doubles ===
==== Seeds ====
Country	Player	Country	Player	Rank^{1}	Seed
RUS	Ekaterina Makarova	RUS	Elena Vesnina	6	1
TPE	Chan Yung-jan	SUI	Martina Hingis	19	2
IND	Sania Mirza	KAZ	Yaroslava Shvedova	20	3
HUN	Tímea Babos	CZE	Andrea Hlaváčková	23	4
CZE	Karolína Plíšková	CZE	Barbora Strýcová	30	5
USA	Abigail Spears	SLO	Katarina Srebotnik	40	6
CAN	Gabriela Dabrowski	CHN	Xu Yifan	44	7
TPE	Chan Hao-ching	LAT	Jeļena Ostapenko	50	8

- Rankings are as of May 8, 2017.

==== Other entrants ====
The following pairs received wildcards into the doubles main draw:

- (Italy) Deborah Chiesa / (Italy) Stefania Rubini
- (Italy) Sara Errani / (Italy) Martina Trevisan
- (Serbia) Jelena Janković / (Germany) Andrea Petkovic

The following pair received entry as alternates:

- (Ukraine) Olga Savchuk / (Ukraine) Elina Svitolina

==== Withdrawals ====
Before the tournament

- (Russia) Daria Kasatkina
