= 2017 Rafael Nadal tennis season =

Statistics for Spanish tennis player

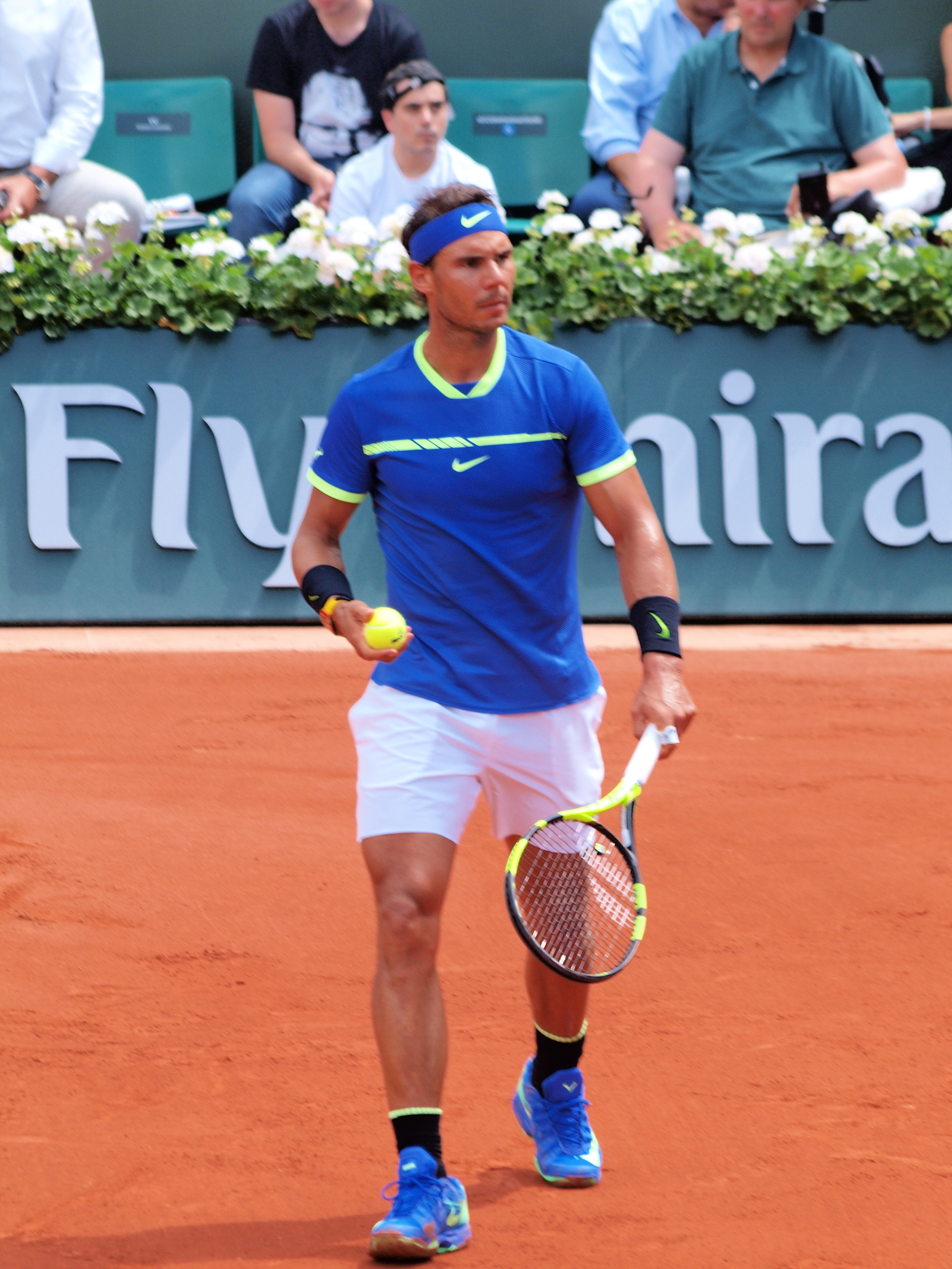
- Rafael Nadal at the 2017 French Open
- Full name: Rafael Nadal Parera
- Country: Spain
- Calendar prize money: $15,864,000

Singles
- Season record: 68–12
- Calendar titles: 6
- Year-end ranking: No. 1
- Ranking change from previous year: ▲8

Grand Slam & significant results
- Australian Open: F
- French Open: W
- Wimbledon: 4R
- US Open: W
- Other tournaments
- Tour Finals: RR

Doubles
- Season record: 2–2
- Year-end ranking: No. 543
- Ranking change from previous year: ▼430

The 2017 Rafael Nadal tennis season officially began on 3 January 2017, with the start of the Brisbane International, and ended on 13 November 2017, with a loss in the round robin of the ATP Finals and subsequent withdrawal from the tournament.

The season marked a resurgence for Nadal after an injury-shortened 2016 season. Nadal won two Majors (the French Open and US Open), six titles, and ended the year as the world No. 1 for the first time since 2013.

== Year summary ==
=== Early hard court season ===
==== Brisbane International ====
Having started the 2017 season defending his title in the World Tennis Championship, Nadal played his first competitive tournament of the season in Australia by taking part in the Brisbane International. His first match and win was against Ukrainian Alexandr Dolgopolov. He beat Mischa Zverev in the next round, before losing to top-seed Milos Raonic in the quarter finals. He next played a FAST4 exhibition tournament in Sydney, which was run concurrently with the Apia International Sydney. He lost to Nick Kyrgios in his only match.

==== Australian Open ====
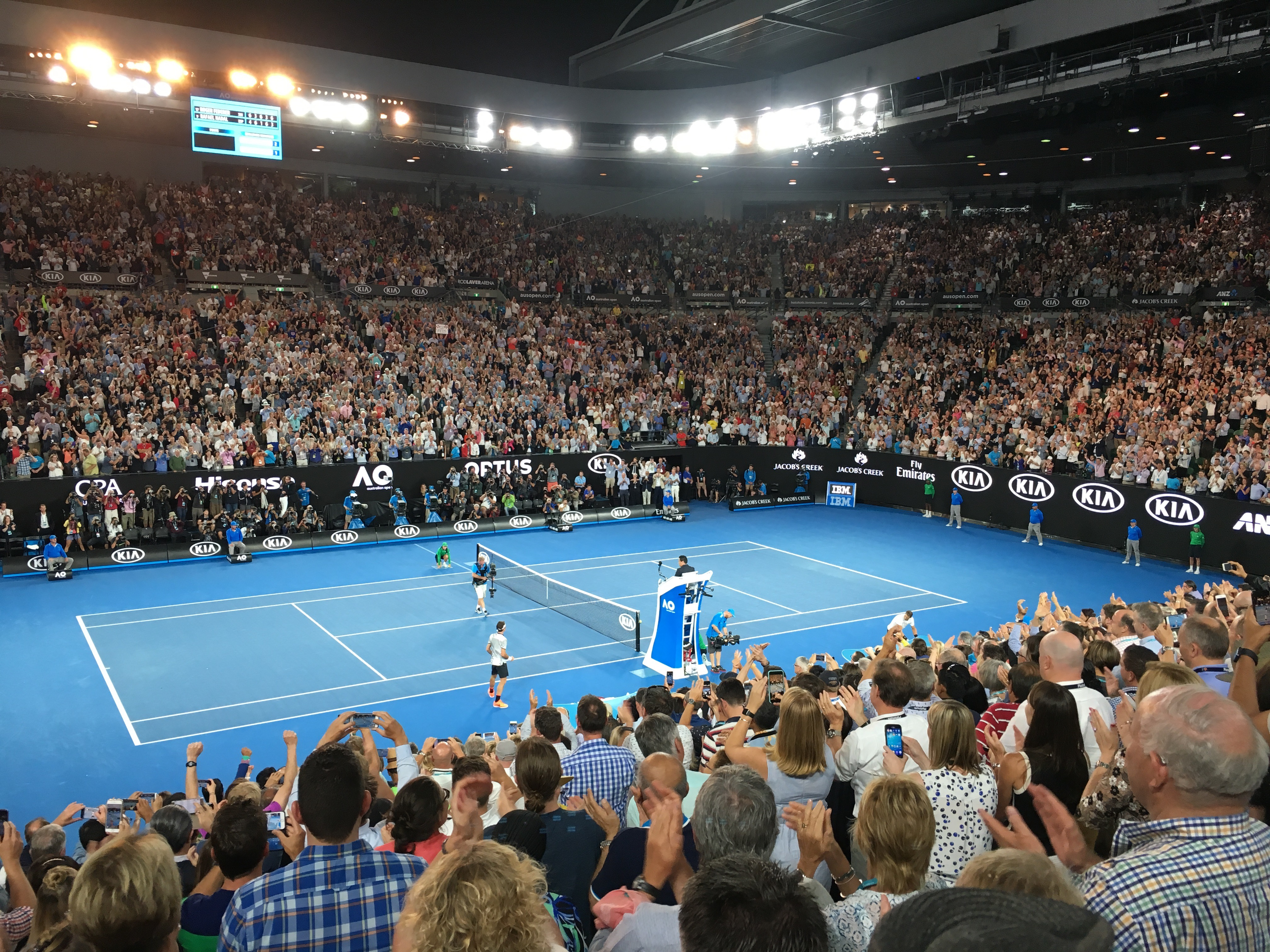
The 2017 Australian Open men's final

Nadal was seeded ninth in the first major of the year, the Australian Open. After two relatively easy rounds against Florian Mayer, and former finalist Marcos Baghdatis, he faced 19-year-old Alexander Zverev in the third round. He prevailed in a five-set match, twice coming back from one set down, after the youngster began suffering cramps in the final set. He defeated the French number one, and world number nine Gaël Monfils in four sets in the fourth round to reach his first quarterfinal since the 2015 French Open. In a rematch against Raonic, he won in straight sets. In the semifinal, he defeated rising Bulgarian star Grigor Dimitrov in a five-set match that lasted just under five hours to reach his first major final since the 2014 French Open. The Australian Open final was the 35th meeting between him and former world number one and long-time rival Roger Federer. Due to their storied rivalry, the advancing age of both players in their respective careers, critical speculation of this being their last Grand Slam finals contest against one another, and the potential tennis history made from either victory and subsequent implications on their respective legacies, the match, referred by the moniker 'Fedal XXXV', was one of the most highly anticipated finals in not only the tournament's history but also all tennis history. The match went to five sets, but despite leading by a break in the final set, Nadal lost the match to Federer (who won his record-extending 18th major title) losing 5 games in a row. It was the first time Nadal lost to Federer at a major outside of Wimbledon, and the first time he lost a Grand slam match to Federer since the Wimbledon 2007 final, won by Federer in 5 sets.

==== Mexican Open ====
Nadal's first scheduled tournament after the Australian Open was to be the Rotterdam Open in Rotterdam. However, he pulled out of this tournament citing fatigue. He decided to play the Mexican Open in Acapulco, and continued his impressive form by reaching the final without the loss of a set. In the first round, he defeated Mischa Zverev for the second time, before winning his second round match against Italian Paolo Lorenzi for the loss of just two games. In the quarterfinal, he eventually closed out Japanese upstart Yoshihito Nishioka despite struggling in the first set. He played eighth-ranked Croatian, Marin Čilić, in the semifinal, winning with the loss of only three games. However, he lost his second consecutive final of the season in two sets to American Sam Querrey.

==== Indian Wells Masters ====
In the first Masters 1000 of the season, the Indian Wells Masters, he was handed a difficult draw due to his low ranking, being placed in the same quarter as his closest rivals, Federer, and Novak Djokovic. He followed his opening round bye with relatively easy straight set victories over Guido Pella, and countryman Fernando Verdasco, before playing Federer once again; the Swiss winning in straight sets this time. He played his first competitive doubles matches of the year, partnering Bernard Tomic. They lost in the second round to the South African-American pairing of Raven Klaasen and Rajeev Ram.

==== Miami Open ====
Nadal then stayed in the United States to compete in the Miami Open. He won in straight sets against Israeli Dudi Sela, and then beat Philipp Kohlschreiber in three sets, despite winning no games in the first set. Two straight set victories over French doubles-specialist Nicolas Mahut, and Jack Sock took him to his first Masters 1000 semifinal since the Monte-Carlo Rolex Masters last year. In the semifinal, he played world number 40, Fabio Fognini; the Italian famous for his comeback victory against Nadal at the 2015 US Open. The two had split their last six matches, but Nadal outclassed him in the first set, before winning a close second set, thereby reaching his fifth Miami Open final and setting up a third meeting between himself and Federer this season. In the final, Nadal lost to Roger Federer, marking his fourth consecutive loss to the Swiss and his fifth final loss in the Miami Open.

=== Spring clay court season ===
==== Monte-Carlo Masters ====
With the absence of Federer, the 5th-ranked Nadal, a nine-time former champion at the tournament, was seeded 4th. After an opening round bye, he played British rising star, Kyle Edmund, in his first competitive match on clay this season. Despite winning the first set comprehensively, Nadal had to overcome a shaky second set to win the match in three sets. Nadal fared better in his next match with Alexander Zverev, winning for the loss of just two games. Nadal took on Diego Schwartzman in the quarterfinal and despite a less-dominant display, rallied to win the match in straight sets. In the semifinal, Nadal made light work of David Goffin to reach his 11th Monte-Carlo final, with Goffin visibly affected by an incorrect line call. He won his first title of the year, and a record 10th Monte-Carlo Masters title by beating compatriot Albert Ramos Viñolas in the final in straight sets, and thus, became the first man in the Open Era to win a single tournament 10 times. The title was also his 50th on clay courts, surpassing the Open Era record for most clay titles previously held by Guillermo Vilas (49 titles). It was also his 29th ATP Masters 1000 title, one short of Novak Djokovic's all-time record of 30 ATP Masters 1000 titles.

==== Barcelona Open ====
Fresh from a landmark victory in Monte Carlo, Nadal proceeded to the Barcelona Open where he was seeded 3rd, and received a bye into the second round. He defeated Brazilian journeyman, Rogério Dutra Silva, for the loss of just three games, before beating Kevin Anderson. In his quarterfinal match, Nadal initially struggled against the upstart Korean, Chung Hyeon, before pulling through. Rafa managed to reach the finals with a straight set victory over Horacio Zeballos in the semifinals. A week after clinching his tenth title at Monte Carlo, he replicated that achievement at Barcelona, dominating Dominic Thiem in the final, winning in straight sets to grab his 10th title in Barcelona. The title was Nadal's record 18th ATP World Tour 500 title, his 71st tour-level crown and 51st on clay.

==== Madrid Open ====
Unbeaten on clay so far, Nadal proceeded to participate in the Madrid Open where he was seeded 4th. After an opening round bye, his second round match against Italian Fabio Fognini lasted three hours, with Nadal winning in three tight sets. He won his third round match versus the big-serving Australian, Nick Kyrgios, fairly easily; the Australian playing his first competitive tournament on clay this year. In a rematch of their Monte-Carlo semifinal, Nadal played David Goffin in the quarterfinal. Nadal won in straight sets yet again, and booked a semifinal clash with longtime nemesis and rival, World No. 2 Novak Djokovic for the 50th time in their careers. Nadal was riding a seven-match losing streak (15 consecutive sets) to the struggling Serb coming into the match. Their contrasting form continued as Nadal won in straight sets, losing just six games, for a spot in the final. The win improved Nadal's head-to-head record with Djokovic to 24–26. In the final, Nadal played Dominic Thiem for the second straight final. After saving two set points in the opening set tiebreak, Nadal recovered to win his third straight title of the season, and his fifth Madrid Open title by winning the final in straight sets. With the win, Nadal tied Djokovic's record of 30 ATP World Tour Masters 1000 singles titles.

==== Italian Open ====
Bidding for a 4th consecutive title of the season and riding a 15-match winning streak, Nadal was seeded 4th and received a bye into the second round in the Italian International. He reached the third round after compatriot Nicolás Almagro retired after three games with an apparent knee injury. A straight sets victory over American 13th seed, Jack Sock pushed him to his ninth consecutive quarterfinal in Rome. For the third tournament in a row, Nadal faced Dominic Thiem, this time in the quarterfinal, but his 17–match winning streak was put to an end with a straight sets loss to the young Austrian.

==== French Open ====
Despite being seeded 4th, Nadal came to the second Grand Slam of the year possessing a 17–1 win–loss record on clay for the season, and as a heavy favourite to win his 10th Roland-Garros title. His strong form continued, as he easily defeated home favorite Benoît Paire, and Dutchman Robin Haase, in the first two rounds. In the third round against top-ranked Georgian Nikoloz Basilashvili, Nadal produced an absolute masterclass, winning the match for the loss of a sole game in the second set. In an all-Spanish affair in the fourth round, Nadal made light work of 17th-seed Roberto Bautista Agut, who managed to take just five games off the former champion. In the quarterfinal, another all-Spanish clash beckoned, Nadal facing Pablo Carreño Busta this time. After a dominant display in the first set, Nadal moved into the semifinals as his compatriot withdrew with an abdominal problem early in the second set. Bidding to reach his tenth final in Paris, and seventh final of the season, Nadal met Dominic Thiem in the semifinal. In the latest chapter to their budding rivalry, Nadal avenged his sole loss of the clay court season, as he beat the Austrian to reach the final. Having lost just 29 games on his road to the final, Nadal faced a Swiss for the second consecutive Slam final, this time World No. 3, Stan Wawrinka. In the final, Nadal continued his outstanding form, defeating Wawrinka to win La Décima (Spanish: the tenth; first used during Real Madrid's 2014 UEFA Champions League victory, and subsequently in the buildup to Nadal's 10th titles at Monte-Carlo, Barcelona, and Paris) at the French Open and consigning the Swiss to his first loss in a Slam final. With this landmark victory, Nadal became the first person in the Open Era to win 10 titles in single Grand Slam event. Nadal won the tournament for the loss of 35 games, thereby marking it as the second best performance, in terms of games lost, by a male tennis player in winning a Grand Slam singles title right after Björn Borg, who lost 32 games at the 1978 Roland-Garros. Nadal also passed Pete Sampras for sole second on the men's Grand Slam singles title list with the victory, his 15 titles only second to Roger Federer's 18 (since 20). It was also Nadal's 73rd Tour title, which ranks him 6th highest in the Open Era, one behind Rod Laver.

=== Grass court season ===
Nadal entered the grass court season not having played a match on grass since his loss to Dustin Brown in the 2015 Wimbledon Championships. He was scheduled to play the Aegon Championships, however withdrew citing a need for rest. Instead of an official tournament, Nadal played two matches in an exhibition tournament at The Hurlingham Club in London before his Wimbledon campaign, losing to Tomáš Berdych, but later defeating Tommy Haas.

==== Wimbledon ====
Nadal was seeded 4th behind Federer, Djokovic and Murray for Wimbledon despite being ranked No. 2 and was in contention for the world No. 1 ranking at the start of the tournament. He began his campaign to win a 3rd Wimbledon title by defeating Australia's John Millman in straight sets. In the round of 32, Nadal dominated the No. 30-seed, Karen Khachanov, defeating him in straight sets and bringing his streak to 28 consecutive grand slam sets won, which equaled his previous best and is the 3rd longest in the Open Era. On 10 July 2017, Nadal faced Gilles Müller in the round of 16 and after forcing a fifth set from 2 sets down, Nadal then saved 4 match points in the deciding set, but came up short on the fifth match point, losing 15-13 in the final set.

=== North American hard court season ===
==== Canadian Open ====
Nadal opened his campaign by beating Borna Ćorić in 2R but went on to lose his 3R encounter against 18 year old Canadian Denis Shapovalov. With this early exit, his chance to get back to top spot halted. Had he reached semifinals, he would have become the world No. 1.

==== Cincinnati Masters ====
Due to the last minute withdrawal of Roger Federer, Rafa ascended to the world No. 1-ranking for the 4th time in his career on 21 August 2017, his 142nd week at the pinnacle of men's tennis. With only 370 points to defend for the rest of 2017, there was a strong possibility that he could finish year-end No. 1 for a 4th separate stint (only two other players have ever finished year-end No. 1 in separate stints, but Federer and Ivan Lendl have only done it in 2 separate stints). Nadal was the No. 1 seed and began his campaign against Frenchman Richard Gasquet. Rafa defeated Gasquet in straight sets, improved his head-to-head record to 15-0 and had now won their last 25 consecutive sets. Due to heavy rain, Nadal was required to play 2 matches in a day, dispatching Albert Ramos in straight sets only to be sent packing by Nick Kyrgios in straight sets later on. Despite this loss, Nadal still was ranked No.1 in the following week.

==== US Open ====
Nadal was seeded No.1 in a grand slam for the first time since the 2014 French Open. Rafa opened the last major of the year against 85th-ranked Serbian Dušan Lajović whom he dismissed in straight sets. In the round of 64, Nadal faced Taro Daniel of Japan and despite trailing by a set and a break, he dispatched Daniel with the loss of just 7 games in the last three sets combined. Lucky loser Leonardo Mayer was up next for Nadal and for the second consecutive match, Rafa started slow and lost the first set in a tie break only to secure the next three sets to move into a round of 16 showdown with Alexandr Dolgopolov. Nadal advanced to his first US Open quarterfinal since he won his second US Open crown in 2013 with a dominant straight sets win in just over an hour and a half. His quarterfinal opponent would be NextGen 19-year old Andrey Rublev of Russia who grew up idolizing Nadal. Nadal successfully defeated the rising star in a one-sided match lasting only 96 minutes with the loss of just 5 games. He next faced Juan Martín del Potro who defeated Federer in 4 sets in the QF, preventing another Federer–Nadal meeting in the US Open and thus allowing Nadal to retain his No.1 ranking. He defeated del Potro in four sets to reach his 23rd major final where he faced Kevin Anderson. Nadal clinched his 16th Grand Slam title and 3rd USO title beating Anderson in straight sets, and also his first hardcourt singles title since Doha 2014. This victory brought him closer to 3 short of Federer's 19 major titles. This win also secured a fourth season where Federer and Nadal won all the Grand Slams (2006, 2007, 2010, 2017).

=== Asian swing ===
==== China Open ====
Nadal opened his Asian swing with a tough draw at the Beijing Open, saving two match points in the 2nd set tiebreak to beat Lucas Pouille in his opening round match. He breezed through his next 2 matches against Karen Khachanov and big-serving John Isner in straight sets to set a blockbuster semifinal with Grigor Dimitrov. Nadal won the semifinal in three sets before defeating Nick Kyrgios in straight sets to win his 75th career title and 2nd title at Beijing following his 2005 crown. It was also Nadal's Tour-leading 6th title of the season and separated him from Roger Federer and Alexander Zverev who each have 5 titles this season. This was Rafa's 2nd consecutive hard court title after losing his last 8 consecutive hard court finals.

==== Shanghai Masters ====
Nadal continued his run of form in the Shanghai Masters, reaching the quarterfinals with the loss of only 7 games against Jared Donaldson and Fabio Fognini. In the quarterfinals, he defeated Grigor Dimitrov for the 2nd time in 2 weeks in three tight sets to reach the semifinals where he faced Marin Čilić, winning the encounter in two grueling sets after saving two set points in the first set, reaching his 10th final of the year and 3rd consecutive tournament final. Nadal was beaten in straight sets by nemesis Roger Federer in the final, ending his winning streak of 16 matches and also marking his 5th consecutive loss to Federer for the first time in their 38 rivalry meetings.

=== European indoor hard court season ===
==== Paris Masters ====
Following Federer's withdrawal from the final Masters 1000 tournament, Nadal clinched the year-end No.1 ranking for the 4th time in his career, also becoming the oldest man to finish the year on top of the rankings since its formation in 1973 at the age of 31, after beating Hyeon Chung in his first match in straight sets. Having previously finished at the top in 2008, 2010 and 2013, Nadal becomes the first player to hold, lose and regain the year-end No. 1 on three occasions. He also became the first player to finish No. 1 four times in non-consecutive years, the first aged over-30 and the first to finish in the top spot four years since he last achieved the feat (2013). The nine-year gap between his first year-end No. 1 season (2008) and his last (2017) is also a record. Nadal managed to reach quarterfinals by beating Pablo Cuevas in the next round, but withdrew from the tournament due to an injured right knee.

==== ATP World Tour Finals ====
Nadal' s final event of the year was at the ATP World Tour Finals. His first round robin match was against David Goffin. Nadal struggled with his knee injury, and ended up losing the match in three tight sets. Following the loss, he withdrew from the tournament, ending his 2017 season.

== All matches ==
This table chronicles all the matches of Rafael Nadal in 2017, including walkovers (W/O) which the ATP does not count as wins or losses.

Key
W	F	SF	QF	#R	RR	Q#	P#	DNQ	A	Z#	PO	G	S	B	NMS	NTI	P	NH

(W) winner; (F) finalist; (SF) semifinalist; (QF) quarterfinalist; (#R) rounds 4, 3, 2, 1; (RR) round-robin stage; (Q#) qualification round; (P#) preliminary round; (DNQ) did not qualify; (A) absent; (Z#) Davis/Fed Cup Zonal Group (with number indication) or (PO) play-off; (G) gold, (S) silver or (B) bronze Olympic/Paralympic medal; (NMS) not a Masters tournament; (NTI) not a Tier I tournament; (P) postponed; (NH) not held; (SR) strike rate (events won / competed); (W–L) win–loss record.
To avoid confusion and double counting, these charts are updated at the conclusion of a tournament or when the player's participation has ended.

=== Singles matches ===
Tournament	Match	Round	Opponent (seed or key)	Rank	Result	Score
Brisbane International; Brisbane, Australia; ATP 250; Hard, outdoor 1 – 8 January 2017
Brisbane International; Brisbane, Australia; ATP 250; Hard, outdoor 1 – 8 January 2017	1 / 981	1R	(Ukraine) Alexandr Dolgopolov	62	Win	6–3, 6–3
Brisbane International; Brisbane, Australia; ATP 250; Hard, outdoor 1 – 8 January 2017	2 / 982	2R	(Germany) Mischa Zverev	51	Win	6–1, 6–1
Brisbane International; Brisbane, Australia; ATP 250; Hard, outdoor 1 – 8 January 2017	3 / 983	QF	(Canada) Milos Raonic (1)	3	Loss	6–4, 3–6, 4–6
Australian Open; Melbourne, Australia; Grand Slam tournament Hard, outdoor 16 – 29 January 2017
Australian Open; Melbourne, Australia; Grand Slam tournament Hard, outdoor 16 – 29 January 2017	4 / 984	1R	(Germany) Florian Mayer	49	Win	6–3, 6–4, 6–4
Australian Open; Melbourne, Australia; Grand Slam tournament Hard, outdoor 16 – 29 January 2017	5 / 985	2R	(Cyprus) Marcos Baghdatis	36	Win	6–3, 6–1, 6–3
Australian Open; Melbourne, Australia; Grand Slam tournament Hard, outdoor 16 – 29 January 2017	6 / 986	3R	(Germany) Alexander Zverev (24)	24	Win	4–6, 6–3, 6–7^{(5–7)}, 6–3, 6–2
Australian Open; Melbourne, Australia; Grand Slam tournament Hard, outdoor 16 – 29 January 2017	7 / 987	4R	(France) Gaël Monfils (6)	6	Win	6–3, 6–3, 4–6, 6–4
Australian Open; Melbourne, Australia; Grand Slam tournament Hard, outdoor 16 – 29 January 2017	8 / 988	QF	(Canada) Milos Raonic (3)	3	Win	6–4, 7–6^{(9–7)}, 6–4
Australian Open; Melbourne, Australia; Grand Slam tournament Hard, outdoor 16 – 29 January 2017	9 / 989	SF	(Bulgaria) Grigor Dimitrov (15)	15	Win	6–3, 5–7, 7–6^{(7–5)}, 6–7^{(4–7)}, 6–4
Australian Open; Melbourne, Australia; Grand Slam tournament Hard, outdoor 16 – 29 January 2017	10 / 990	F	(Switzerland) Roger Federer (17)	17	Loss (1)	4–6, 6–3, 1–6, 6–3, 3–6
Mexican Open; Acapulco, Mexico; ATP 500; Hard, outdoor 27 February – 5 March 2017
Mexican Open; Acapulco, Mexico; ATP 500; Hard, outdoor 27 February – 5 March 2017	11 / 991	1R	(Germany) Mischa Zverev	30	Win	6–4, 6–3
Mexican Open; Acapulco, Mexico; ATP 500; Hard, outdoor 27 February – 5 March 2017	12 / 992	2R	(Italy) Paolo Lorenzi	38	Win	6–1, 6–1
Mexican Open; Acapulco, Mexico; ATP 500; Hard, outdoor 27 February – 5 March 2017	13 / 993	QF	(Japan) Yoshihito Nishioka (Q)	86	Win	7–6^{(7–2)}, 6–3
Mexican Open; Acapulco, Mexico; ATP 500; Hard, outdoor 27 February – 5 March 2017	14 / 994	SF	(Croatia) Marin Čilić (3)	8	Win	6–1, 6–2
Mexican Open; Acapulco, Mexico; ATP 500; Hard, outdoor 27 February – 5 March 2017	15 / 995	F	(United States) Sam Querrey	40	Loss (2)	3–6, 6–7^{(3–7)}
Indian Wells Masters; Indian Wells, United States; ATP 1000; Hard, outdoor 6 – 19 March 2017
Indian Wells Masters; Indian Wells, United States; ATP 1000; Hard, outdoor 6 – 19 March 2017	–	1R	Bye			
Indian Wells Masters; Indian Wells, United States; ATP 1000; Hard, outdoor 6 – 19 March 2017	16 / 996	2R	(Argentina) Guido Pella	145	Win	6–3, 6–2
Indian Wells Masters; Indian Wells, United States; ATP 1000; Hard, outdoor 6 – 19 March 2017	17 / 997	3R	(Spain) Fernando Verdasco (26)	29	Win	6–3, 7–5
Indian Wells Masters; Indian Wells, United States; ATP 1000; Hard, outdoor 6 – 19 March 2017	18 / 998	4R	(Switzerland) Roger Federer (9)	10	Loss	2–6, 3–6
Miami Open; Miami, United States; ATP 1000; Hard, outdoor 20 March – 2 April 2017
Miami Open; Miami, United States; ATP 1000; Hard, outdoor 20 March – 2 April 2017	–	1R	Bye			
Miami Open; Miami, United States; ATP 1000; Hard, outdoor 20 March – 2 April 2017	19 / 999	2R	(Israel) Dudi Sela	83	Win	6–3, 6–4
Miami Open; Miami, United States; ATP 1000; Hard, outdoor 20 March – 2 April 2017	20 / 1000	3R	(Germany) Philipp Kohlschreiber (26)	31	Win	0–6, 6–2, 6–3
Miami Open; Miami, United States; ATP 1000; Hard, outdoor 20 March – 2 April 2017	21 / 1001	4R	(France) Nicolas Mahut	55	Win	6–4, 7–6^{(7–4)}
Miami Open; Miami, United States; ATP 1000; Hard, outdoor 20 March – 2 April 2017	22 / 1002	QF	(United States) Jack Sock (13)	17	Win	6–2, 6–3
Miami Open; Miami, United States; ATP 1000; Hard, outdoor 20 March – 2 April 2017	23 / 1003	SF	(Italy) Fabio Fognini	40	Win	6–1, 7–5
Miami Open; Miami, United States; ATP 1000; Hard, outdoor 20 March – 2 April 2017	24 / 1004	F	(Switzerland) Roger Federer (4)	6	Loss (3)	3–6, 4–6
Monte-Carlo Masters; Monte Carlo, Monaco; ATP 1000; Clay, outdoor 16 – 23 April 2017
Monte-Carlo Masters; Monte Carlo, Monaco; ATP 1000; Clay, outdoor 16 – 23 April 2017	–	1R	Bye			
Monte-Carlo Masters; Monte Carlo, Monaco; ATP 1000; Clay, outdoor 16 – 23 April 2017	25 / 1005	2R	(United Kingdom) Kyle Edmund	45	Win	6–0, 5–7, 6–3
Monte-Carlo Masters; Monte Carlo, Monaco; ATP 1000; Clay, outdoor 16 – 23 April 2017	26 / 1006	3R	(Germany) Alexander Zverev (14)	20	Win	6–1, 6–1
Monte-Carlo Masters; Monte Carlo, Monaco; ATP 1000; Clay, outdoor 16 – 23 April 2017	27 / 1007	QF	(Argentina) Diego Schwartzman	41	Win	6–4, 6–4
Monte-Carlo Masters; Monte Carlo, Monaco; ATP 1000; Clay, outdoor 16 – 23 April 2017	28 / 1008	SF	(Belgium) David Goffin (10)	13	Win	6–3, 6–1
Monte-Carlo Masters; Monte Carlo, Monaco; ATP 1000; Clay, outdoor 16 – 23 April 2017	29 / 1009	W	(Spain) Albert Ramos Viñolas (15)	24	Win (1)	6–1, 6–3
Barcelona Open; Barcelona, Spain; ATP 500; Clay, outdoor 24 – 30 April 2017
Barcelona Open; Barcelona, Spain; ATP 500; Clay, outdoor 24 – 30 April 2017	–	1R	Bye			
Barcelona Open; Barcelona, Spain; ATP 500; Clay, outdoor 24 – 30 April 2017	30 / 1010	2R	(Brazil) Rogério Dutra Silva	69	Win	6–1, 6–2
Barcelona Open; Barcelona, Spain; ATP 500; Clay, outdoor 24 – 30 April 2017	31 / 1011	3R	(South Africa) Kevin Anderson	66	Win	6–3, 6–4
Barcelona Open; Barcelona, Spain; ATP 500; Clay, outdoor 24 – 30 April 2017	32 / 1012	QF	(South Korea) Chung Hyeon (Q)	94	Win	7–6^{(7–1)}, 6–2
Barcelona Open; Barcelona, Spain; ATP 500; Clay, outdoor 24 – 30 April 2017	33 / 1013	SF	(Argentina) Horacio Zeballos	84	Win	6–3, 6–4
Barcelona Open; Barcelona, Spain; ATP 500; Clay, outdoor 24 – 30 April 2017	34 / 1014	W	(Austria) Dominic Thiem (4)	9	Win (2)	6–4, 6–1
Madrid Open; Madrid, Spain; ATP 1000; Clay, outdoor 7 – 14 May 2017
Madrid Open; Madrid, Spain; ATP 1000; Clay, outdoor 7 – 14 May 2017	–	1R	Bye			
Madrid Open; Madrid, Spain; ATP 1000; Clay, outdoor 7 – 14 May 2017	35 / 1015	2R	(Italy) Fabio Fognini	29	Win	7–6^{(7–3)}, 3–6, 6–4
Madrid Open; Madrid, Spain; ATP 1000; Clay, outdoor 7 – 14 May 2017	36 / 1016	3R	(Australia) Nick Kyrgios (16)	20	Win	6–3, 6–1
Madrid Open; Madrid, Spain; ATP 1000; Clay, outdoor 7 – 14 May 2017	37 / 1017	QF	(Belgium) David Goffin (9)	10	Win	7–6^{(7–3)}, 6–2
Madrid Open; Madrid, Spain; ATP 1000; Clay, outdoor 7 – 14 May 2017	38 / 1018	SF	(Serbia) Novak Djokovic (2)	2	Win	6–2, 6–4
Madrid Open; Madrid, Spain; ATP 1000; Clay, outdoor 7 – 14 May 2017	39 / 1019	W	(Austria) Dominic Thiem (8)	9	Win (3)	7–6^{(10–8)}, 6–4
Italian Open; Rome, Italy; ATP 1000; Clay, outdoor 15 – 22 May 2017
Italian Open; Rome, Italy; ATP 1000; Clay, outdoor 15 – 22 May 2017	–	1R	Bye			
Italian Open; Rome, Italy; ATP 1000; Clay, outdoor 15 – 22 May 2017	40 / 1020	2R	(Spain) Nicolás Almagro (Q)	73	Win	3–0 ret.
Italian Open; Rome, Italy; ATP 1000; Clay, outdoor 15 – 22 May 2017	41 / 1021	3R	(United States) Jack Sock (13)	14	Win	6–3, 6–4
Italian Open; Rome, Italy; ATP 1000; Clay, outdoor 15 – 22 May 2017	42 / 1022	QF	(Austria) Dominic Thiem (8)	7	Loss	4–6, 3–6
French Open; Paris, France; Grand Slam tournament Clay, outdoor 28 May – 11 June 2017
French Open; Paris, France; Grand Slam tournament Clay, outdoor 28 May – 11 June 2017	43 / 1023	1R	(France) Benoît Paire	45	Win	6–1, 6–4, 6–1
French Open; Paris, France; Grand Slam tournament Clay, outdoor 28 May – 11 June 2017	44 / 1024	2R	(Netherlands) Robin Haase	46	Win	6–1, 6–4, 6–3
French Open; Paris, France; Grand Slam tournament Clay, outdoor 28 May – 11 June 2017	45 / 1025	3R	(Georgia (country)) Nikoloz Basilashvili	63	Win	6–0, 6–1, 6–0
French Open; Paris, France; Grand Slam tournament Clay, outdoor 28 May – 11 June 2017	46 / 1026	4R	(Spain) Roberto Bautista Agut (17)	18	Win	6–1, 6–2, 6–2
French Open; Paris, France; Grand Slam tournament Clay, outdoor 28 May – 11 June 2017	47 / 1027	QF	(Spain) Pablo Carreño Busta (20)	21	Win	6–2, 2–0 ret.
French Open; Paris, France; Grand Slam tournament Clay, outdoor 28 May – 11 June 2017	48 / 1028	SF	(Austria) Dominic Thiem (6)	7	Win	6–3, 6–4, 6–0
French Open; Paris, France; Grand Slam tournament Clay, outdoor 28 May – 11 June 2017	49 / 1029	W	(Switzerland) Stan Wawrinka (3)	3	Win (4)	6–2, 6–3, 6–1
Wimbledon Championships; London, United Kingdom; Grand Slam tournament Grass, outdoor 3 – 16 July 2017
Wimbledon Championships; London, United Kingdom; Grand Slam tournament Grass, outdoor 3 – 16 July 2017	50 / 1030	1R	(Australia) John Millman (PR)	137	Win	6–1, 6–3, 6–2
Wimbledon Championships; London, United Kingdom; Grand Slam tournament Grass, outdoor 3 – 16 July 2017	51 / 1031	2R	(United States) Donald Young	43	Win	6–4, 6–2, 7–5
Wimbledon Championships; London, United Kingdom; Grand Slam tournament Grass, outdoor 3 – 16 July 2017	52 / 1032	3R	(Russia) Karen Khachanov (30)	34	Win	6–1, 6–4, 7–6^{(7–3)}
Wimbledon Championships; London, United Kingdom; Grand Slam tournament Grass, outdoor 3 – 16 July 2017	53 / 1033	4R	(Luxembourg) Gilles Müller (16)	26	Loss	3–6, 4–6, 6–3, 6–4, 13–15
Canadian Open; Montreal, Canada; ATP 1000; Hard, outdoor 7 – 13 August 2017
Canadian Open; Montreal, Canada; ATP 1000; Hard, outdoor 7 – 13 August 2017	–	1R	Bye			
Canadian Open; Montreal, Canada; ATP 1000; Hard, outdoor 7 – 13 August 2017	54 / 1034	2R	(Croatia) Borna Ćorić	55	Win	6–1, 6–2
Canadian Open; Montreal, Canada; ATP 1000; Hard, outdoor 7 – 13 August 2017	55 / 1035	3R	(Canada) Denis Shapovalov (WC)	143	Loss	6–3, 4–6, 6–7^{(4–7)}
Cincinnati Masters; Cincinnati, United States; ATP 1000; Hard, outdoor 14 – 20 August 2017
Cincinnati Masters; Cincinnati, United States; ATP 1000; Hard, outdoor 14 – 20 August 2017	–	1R	Bye			
Cincinnati Masters; Cincinnati, United States; ATP 1000; Hard, outdoor 14 – 20 August 2017	56 / 1036	2R	(France) Richard Gasquet	29	Win	6–3, 6–4
Cincinnati Masters; Cincinnati, United States; ATP 1000; Hard, outdoor 14 – 20 August 2017	57 / 1037	3R	(Spain) Albert Ramos Viñolas	24	Win	7–6^{(7–1)}, 6–2
Cincinnati Masters; Cincinnati, United States; ATP 1000; Hard, outdoor 14 – 20 August 2017	58 / 1038	QF	(Australia) Nick Kyrgios	23	Loss	2–6, 5–7
US Open; New York City, United States; Grand Slam tournament Hard, outdoor 28 August – 10 September 2017
US Open; New York City, United States; Grand Slam tournament Hard, outdoor 28 August – 10 September 2017	59 / 1039	1R	(Serbia) Dušan Lajović	84	Win	7–6^{(8–6)}, 6–2, 6–2
US Open; New York City, United States; Grand Slam tournament Hard, outdoor 28 August – 10 September 2017	60 / 1040	2R	(Japan) Taro Daniel	121	Win	4–6, 6–3, 6–2, 6–2
US Open; New York City, United States; Grand Slam tournament Hard, outdoor 28 August – 10 September 2017	61 / 1041	3R	(Argentina) Leonardo Mayer (LL)	59	Win	6–7^{(3–7)}, 6–3, 6–1, 6–4
US Open; New York City, United States; Grand Slam tournament Hard, outdoor 28 August – 10 September 2017	62 / 1042	4R	(Ukraine) Alexandr Dolgopolov	64	Win	6–2, 6–4, 6–1
US Open; New York City, United States; Grand Slam tournament Hard, outdoor 28 August – 10 September 2017	63 / 1043	QF	(Russia) Andrey Rublev	53	Win	6–1, 6–2, 6–2
US Open; New York City, United States; Grand Slam tournament Hard, outdoor 28 August – 10 September 2017	64 / 1044	SF	(Argentina) Juan Martín del Potro (24)	28	Win	4–6, 6–0, 6–3, 6–2
US Open; New York City, United States; Grand Slam tournament Hard, outdoor 28 August – 10 September 2017	65 / 1045	W	(South Africa) Kevin Anderson (28)	32	Win (5)	6–3, 6–3, 6–4
Laver Cup; Prague, Czech Republic; Laver Cup; Hard, indoor 22 – 24 September 2017
Laver Cup; Prague, Czech Republic; Laver Cup; Hard, indoor 22 – 24 September 2017	66 / 1046	Day 2	(United States) Jack Sock	21	Win	6–3, 3–6, [11–9]
Laver Cup; Prague, Czech Republic; Laver Cup; Hard, indoor 22 – 24 September 2017	67 / 1047	Day 3	(United States) John Isner	17	Loss	5–7, 6–7^{(1–7)}
China Open; Beijing, China; ATP 500; Hard, outdoor 2 – 8 October 2017
China Open; Beijing, China; ATP 500; Hard, outdoor 2 – 8 October 2017	68 / 1048	1R	(France) Lucas Pouille	23	Win	4–6, 7–6^{(8–6)}, 7–5
China Open; Beijing, China; ATP 500; Hard, outdoor 2 – 8 October 2017	69 / 1049	2R	(Russia) Karen Khachanov	42	Win	6–3, 6–3
China Open; Beijing, China; ATP 500; Hard, outdoor 2 – 8 October 2017	70 / 1050	QF	(United States) John Isner (6)	17	Win	6–4, 7–6^{(7–0)}
China Open; Beijing, China; ATP 500; Hard, outdoor 2 – 8 October 2017	71 / 1051	SF	(Bulgaria) Grigor Dimitrov (3)	8	Win	6–3, 4–6, 6–1
China Open; Beijing, China; ATP 500; Hard, outdoor 2 – 8 October 2017	72 / 1052	W	(Australia) Nick Kyrgios (8)	19	Win (6)	6–2, 6–1
Shanghai Masters; Shanghai, China; ATP 1000; Hard, outdoor 9 – 15 October 2017
Shanghai Masters; Shanghai, China; ATP 1000; Hard, outdoor 9 – 15 October 2017	–	1R	Bye			
Shanghai Masters; Shanghai, China; ATP 1000; Hard, outdoor 9 – 15 October 2017	73 / 1053	2R	(United States) Jared Donaldson	56	Win	6–2, 6–1
Shanghai Masters; Shanghai, China; ATP 1000; Hard, outdoor 9 – 15 October 2017	74 / 1054	3R	(Italy) Fabio Fognini	28	Win	6–3, 6–1
Shanghai Masters; Shanghai, China; ATP 1000; Hard, outdoor 9 – 15 October 2017	75 / 1055	QF	(Bulgaria) Grigor Dimitrov (6)	9	Win	6–4, 6–7^{(4–7)}, 6–3
Shanghai Masters; Shanghai, China; ATP 1000; Hard, outdoor 9 – 15 October 2017	76 / 1056	SF	(Croatia) Marin Čilić (4)	5	Win	7–5, 7–6^{(7–3)}
Shanghai Masters; Shanghai, China; ATP 1000; Hard, outdoor 9 – 15 October 2017	77 / 1057	F	(Switzerland) Roger Federer (2)	2	Loss (4)	4–6, 3–6
Paris Masters; Paris, France; ATP 1000; Hard, indoor 30 October – 5 November 2017
Paris Masters; Paris, France; ATP 1000; Hard, indoor 30 October – 5 November 2017	–	1R	Bye			
Paris Masters; Paris, France; ATP 1000; Hard, indoor 30 October – 5 November 2017	78 / 1058	2R	(South Korea) Chung Hyeon	55	Win	7–5, 6–3
Paris Masters; Paris, France; ATP 1000; Hard, indoor 30 October – 5 November 2017	79 / 1059	3R	(Uruguay) Pablo Cuevas	36	Win	6–3, 6–7^{(5–7)}, 6–3
Paris Masters; Paris, France; ATP 1000; Hard, indoor 30 October – 5 November 2017	–	QF	(Serbia) Filip Krajinović (Q)	77	Withdrew	N/A
ATP Finals; London, United Kingdom; ATP Finals; Hard, indoor 12 – 19 November 2017
ATP Finals; London, United Kingdom; ATP Finals; Hard, indoor 12 – 19 November 2017	80 / 1060	RR	(Belgium) David Goffin (7)	8	Loss	6–7^{(5–7)}, 7–6^{(7–4)}, 4–6
ATP Finals; London, United Kingdom; ATP Finals; Hard, indoor 12 – 19 November 2017	–	RR	(Austria) Dominic Thiem (4)	4	Withdrew	N/A
ATP Finals; London, United Kingdom; ATP Finals; Hard, indoor 12 – 19 November 2017	–	RR	(Bulgaria) Grigor Dimitrov (6)	6	Withdrew	N/A

=== Doubles matches ===
Tournament	Match	Round	Opponents (seed or key)	Ranks	Result	Score
Indian Wells Masters; Indian Wells, United States; ATP 1000; Hard, outdoor 6 – 19 March 2017; Partner: (Australia) Bernard Tomic
Indian Wells Masters; Indian Wells, United States; ATP 1000; Hard, outdoor 6 – 19 March 2017; Partner: (Australia) Bernard Tomic	1 / 202	1R	(Spain) Pablo Carreño Busta / (Portugal) João Sousa	19 / 151	Win	6–4, 7–6^{(9–7)}
Indian Wells Masters; Indian Wells, United States; ATP 1000; Hard, outdoor 6 – 19 March 2017; Partner: (Australia) Bernard Tomic	2 / 203	2R	(South Africa) Raven Klaasen / (United States) Rajeev Ram (6)	13 / 14	Loss	6–3, 6–7^{(4–7)}, [9–11]
Laver Cup; Prague, Czech Republic; Laver Cup; Hard, indoor 18 – 24 September 2017; Partner: (Czech Republic) Tomáš Berdych (Day 1) (Switzerland) Roger Federer (Day 2)
Laver Cup; Prague, Czech Republic; Laver Cup; Hard, indoor 18 – 24 September 2017; Partner: (Czech Republic) Tomáš Berdych (Day 1) (Switzerland) Roger Federer (Day 2)	3 / 204	Day 1	(Australia) Nick Kyrgios / (United States) Jack Sock	77 / 25	Loss	3–6, 7–6^{(9–7)}, [7–10]
Laver Cup; Prague, Czech Republic; Laver Cup; Hard, indoor 18 – 24 September 2017; Partner: (Czech Republic) Tomáš Berdych (Day 1) (Switzerland) Roger Federer (Day 2)	4 / 205	Day 2	(United States) Sam Querrey / (United States) Jack Sock	76 / 25	Win	6–4, 1–6, [10–5]

== Exhibition matches ==
=== Singles ===
Tournament	Match	Round	Opponent (seed or key)	Rank	Result	Score
World Tennis Championship; Abu Dhabi, United Arab Emirates Hard, outdoor 29 – 31 December 2016
World Tennis Championship; Abu Dhabi, United Arab Emirates Hard, outdoor 29 – 31 December 2016	1	QF	(Czech Republic) Tomáš Berdych	10	Win	6–0, 6–4
World Tennis Championship; Abu Dhabi, United Arab Emirates Hard, outdoor 29 – 31 December 2016	2	SF	(Canada) Milos Raonic (2)	3	Win	6–1, 3–6, 6–3
World Tennis Championship; Abu Dhabi, United Arab Emirates Hard, outdoor 29 – 31 December 2016	3	W	(Belgium) David Goffin	11	Win	6–4, 7–6^{(7–5)}
Fast4 Showdown; Sydney, Australia Hard, outdoor 9 January 2017
Fast4 Showdown; Sydney, Australia Hard, outdoor 9 January 2017	1	N/A	(Australia) Nick Kyrgios	14	Loss	3–4^{(3–5)}, 4–2, 3–4^{(4–5)}, 3–4^{(2–5)}
Hurlingham Tennis Classic; London, United Kingdom Grass, outdoor 27 – 30 June 2017
Hurlingham Tennis Classic; London, United Kingdom Grass, outdoor 27 – 30 June 2017	1	N/A	(Czech Republic) Tomáš Berdych	14	Loss	3–6, 2–6
Hurlingham Tennis Classic; London, United Kingdom Grass, outdoor 27 – 30 June 2017	2	N/A	(Germany) Tommy Haas	255	Win	6–4, 1–6, [10–7]

== Schedule ==
=== Singles schedule ===
Date	Tournament	Location	Category	Surface	Prev. result	Prev. points	New points	Result
1 January 2017– 8 January 2017	Brisbane International	Brisbane (AUS)	250 Series	Hard	A	N/A	45	Quarterfinals (lost to Milos Raonic, 6–4, 3–6, 4–6)
16 January 2017– 29 January 2017	Australian Open	Melbourne (AUS)	Grand Slam	Hard	1R	10	1200	Final (lost to Roger Federer, 4–6, 6–3, 1–6, 6–3, 3–6)
27 February 2017– 4 March 2017	Mexican Open	Acapulco (MEX)	500 Series	Hard	A	N/A	300	Final (lost to Sam Querrey, 3–6, 6–7^{(3–7)})
6 March 2017– 19 March 2017	Indian Wells Masters	Indian Wells (USA)	Masters 1000	Hard	SF	360	90	Fourth round (lost to Roger Federer, 2–6, 3–6)
20 March 2017– 2 April 2017	Miami Open	Miami (USA)	Masters 1000	Hard	2R	10	600	Final (lost to Roger Federer, 3–6, 4–6)
16 April 2017– 23 April 2017	Monte-Carlo Masters	Monte Carlo (MON)	Masters 1000	Clay	W	1000	1000	Champion (defeated Albert Ramos Viñolas, 6–1, 6–3)
24 April 2017– 30 April 2017	Barcelona Open	Barcelona (ESP)	500 Series	Clay	W	500	500	Champion (defeated Dominic Thiem, 6–4, 6–1)
7 May 2017– 14 May 2017	Madrid Open	Madrid (ESP)	Masters 1000	Clay	SF	360	1000	Champion (defeated Dominic Thiem, 7–6^{(10–8)}, 6–4)
15 May 2017– 21 May 2017	Italian Open	Rome (ITA)	Masters 1000	Clay	QF	180	180	Quarterfinals (lost to Dominic Thiem, 4–6, 3–6)
28 May 2017– 11 June 2017	French Open	Paris (FRA)	Grand Slam	Clay	3R	90	2000	Champion (defeated Stan Wawrinka, 6–2, 6–3, 6–1)
3 July 2017– 16 July 2017	Wimbledon	London (GBR)	Grand Slam	Grass	A	N/A	180	Fourth round (lost to Gilles Müller, 3–6, 4–6, 6–3, 6–4, 13–15)
7 August 2017– 13 August 2017	Canadian Open	Montreal (CAN)	Masters 1000	Hard	A	N/A	90	Third round (lost to Denis Shapovalov, 6–3, 4–6, 6–7^{(4–7)})
14 August 2017– 20 August 2017	Cincinnati Masters	Cincinnati (USA)	Masters 1000	Hard	3R	90	180	Quarterfinals (lost to Nick Kyrgios, 2–6, 5–7)
28 August 2017– 10 September 2017	US Open	New York City (USA)	Grand Slam	Hard	4R	180	2000	Champion (defeated Kevin Anderson, 6–3, 6–3, 6–4)
22 September 2017– 24 September 2017	Laver Cup	Prague (CZE)	Laver Cup	Hard (i)	N/A	N/A	N/A	Europe defeated World, 15–9
2 October 2017– 8 October 2017	China Open	Beijing (CHN)	500 Series	Hard	QF	90	500	Champion (defeated Nick Kyrgios, 6–2, 6–1)
8 October 2017– 15 October 2017	Shanghai Masters	Shanghai (CHN)	Masters 1000	Hard	2R	10	600	Final (lost to Roger Federer, 4–6, 3–6)
30 October 2017– 5 November 2017	Paris Masters	Paris (FRA)	Masters 1000	Hard (i)	A	N/A	180	Quarterfinals (withdrew to Filip Krajinović)
12 November 2017– 19 November 2017	ATP Finals	London (GBR)	Tour Finals	Hard (i)	A	N/A	0	Round robin (withdrew to Dominic Thiem and Grigor Dimitrov)
Total year-end points						3300	10645	▲7345 difference

=== Doubles schedule ===
Date	Tournament	Location	Category	Surface	Prev. result	Prev. points	New points	Result
6 March 2017– 19 March 2017	Indian Wells Masters	Indian Wells (USA)	Masters 1000	Hard	1R	0	90	Second round (lost to Klaasen / Ram, 6–3, 6–7^{(4–7)}, [9–11])
Total year-end points						590	90	▼500 difference

== Yearly records ==
=== Head-to-head matchups ===
Rafael Nadal has a 68–12 match win–loss record in the 2017 season. His 2017 record against top-10 players is 12–6. The following list is ordered by number of wins: (Bolded number marks a top 10 player at the time of match, Italic means top 20)

- (Bulgaria) **Grigor Dimitrov** 3–0
- (Austria) **Dominic Thiem** 3–1
- (Italy) Fabio Fognini 3–0
- (Croatia) **Marin Čilić** 2–0
- (Germany) Alexander Zverev 2–0
- (United States) Jack Sock 3–0
- (Russia) Karen Khachanov 2–0
- (South Africa) Kevin Anderson 2–0
- (Spain) Albert Ramos Viñolas 2–0
- (Ukraine) Alexandr Dolgopolov 2–0
- (Germany) Mischa Zverev 2–0
- (South Korea) Hyeon Chung 2–0
- (Belgium) **David Goffin** 2–1
- (Australia) Nick Kyrgios 2–1
- (Switzerland) **Stan Wawrinka** 1–0
- (Serbia) **Novak Djokovic** 1–0
- (France) **Gaël Monfils** 1–0
- (United States) John Isner 1–1
- (Spain) Roberto Bautista Agut 1–0
- (Argentina) Juan Martín del Potro 1–0
- (France) Richard Gasquet 1–0
- (Croatia) Borna Ćorić 1–0
- (Argentina) Leonardo Mayer 1–0
- (France) Nicolas Mahut 1–0
- (Argentina) Horacio Zeballos 1–0
- (Australia) John Millman 1–0
- (France) Lucas Pouille 1–0
- (Russia) Andrey Rublev 1–0
- (Spain) Nicolás Almagro 1–0
- (Spain) Pablo Carreño Busta 1–0
- (United States) Donald Young 1–0
- (United Kingdom) Kyle Edmund 1–0
- (France) Benoît Paire 1–0
- (Georgia (country)) Nikoloz Basilashvili 1–0
- (Netherlands) Robin Haase 1–0
- (Serbia) Dušan Lajović 1–0
- (Uruguay) Pablo Cuevas 1–0
- (Germany) Philipp Kohlschreiber 1–0
- (Spain) Fernando Verdasco 1–0
- (United States) Jared Donaldson 1–0
- (Japan) Taro Daniel 1–0
- (Argentina) Diego Schwartzman 1–0
- (Israel) Dudi Sela 1–0
- (Argentina) Guido Pella 1–0
- (Japan) Yoshihito Nishioka 1–0
- (Brazil) Rogério Dutra Silva 1–0
- (Italy) Paolo Lorenzi 1–0
- (Cyprus) Marcos Baghdatis 1–0
- (Germany) Florian Mayer 1–0
- (Canada) **Milos Raonic** 1–1
- (United States) Sam Querrey 0–1
- (Luxembourg) Gilles Müller 0–1
- (Canada) Denis Shapovalov 0–1
- (Switzerland) **Roger Federer** 0–4

=== Finals ===
==== Singles: 10 (6 titles, 4 runners-up) ====
Category Grand Slam (2–1) ATP Finals (0–0) ATP World Tour Masters 1000 (2–2) ATP World Tour 500 (2–1) ATP World Tour 250 (0–0)	Titles by surface Hard (2–4) Clay (4–0) Grass (0–0)	Titles by setting Outdoor (6–4) Indoor (0–0)

Result	No.	Date	Category	Tournament	Surface	Opponent	Score
Runner-up	33.	29 January 2017	Grand Slam	Australian Open, Australia	Hard	(Switzerland) Roger Federer	4–6, 6–3, 1–6, 6–3, 3–6
Runner-up	34.	4 March 2017	500 Series	Mexican Open, Mexico	Hard	(United States) Sam Querrey	3–6, 6–7^{(3–7)}
Runner-up	35.	2 April 2017	Masters 1000	Miami Open, United States	Hard	(Switzerland) Roger Federer	3–6, 4–6
Winner	70.	23 April 2017	Masters 1000	Monte-Carlo Masters, Monaco (10)	Clay	(Spain) Albert Ramos Viñolas	6–1, 6–3
Winner	71.	30 April 2017	500 Series	Barcelona Open, Spain (10)	Clay	(Austria) Dominic Thiem	6–4, 6–1
Winner	72.	14 May 2017	Masters 1000	Madrid Open, Spain (5)	Clay	(Austria) Dominic Thiem	7–6^{(10–8)}, 6–4
Winner	73.	11 June 2017	Grand Slam	French Open, France (10)	Clay	(Switzerland) Stan Wawrinka	6–2, 6–3, 6–1
Winner	74.	10 September 2017	Grand Slam	US Open, United States (3)	Hard	(South Africa) Kevin Anderson	6–3, 6–3, 6–4
Winner	75.	8 October 2017	500 Series	China Open, China (2)	Hard	(Australia) Nick Kyrgios	6–2, 6–1
Runner-up	36.	15 October 2017	Masters 1000	Shanghai Masters, Shanghai, China	Hard	(Switzerland) Roger Federer	4–6, 3–6

==== Team competitions: 1 (1 title) ====
Result	No.	Date	Tournament	Surface	Partners	Opponents	Score
Winner	5.	24 September 2017	Laver Cup, Czech Republic	Hard (i)	(Switzerland) Roger Federer (Germany) Alexander Zverev (Austria) Dominic Thiem (Croatia) Marin Čilić (Czech Republic) Tomáš Berdych	(United States) Sam Querrey (United States) John Isner (Australia) Nick Kyrgios (United States) Jack Sock (Canada) Denis Shapovalov (United States) Frances Tiafoe	15–9

=== Earnings ===
- **Bold** font denotes tournament win

#	Venue	Singles prize money	Year-to-date
1.	Brisbane International	$11,705	$11,705
2.	Australian Open	A$1,900,000	$1,399,805
3.	Mexican Open	$157,510	$1,557,315
4.	Indian Wells Masters	$77,265	$1,634,580
5.	Miami Open	$573,680	$2,208,260
6.	**Monte-Carlo Masters**	**€820,035**	**$3,078,235**
7.	**Barcelona Open**	**€464,260**	**$3,576,014**
8.	**Madrid Open**	**€1,043,680**	**$4,723,436**
9.	Italian Open	€102,900	$4,835,885
10.	**French Open**	**€2,100,000**	**$7,182,845**
11.	Wimbledon	£147,000	$7,374,210
12.	Rogers Cup	$58,295	$7,432,505
13.	Cincinnati Open	$119,740	$7,552,245
14.	**US Open**	**$3,700,000**	**$11,252,245**
15.	**China Open**	**$652,370**	**$11,904,615**
16.	Shanghai Masters	$584,845	$12,474,695
17.	Paris Masters	€107,095	$12,586,340
18.	ATP Finals	$105,000	$12,691,340
19.	2017 ATP Year-end Bonus Pool	$3,160,001	$15,851,341

== Television ==
Several Nadal matches earned significant audiences on Spanish television.

- The Australian Open final versus Federer had an average 20.5% share and 1.317 million viewers on DMax, and a 10.3% share and 663,000 viewers on Eurosport.
- The Madrid Masters final versus Thiem had an average 15.6% share and 1,793,000 viewers on La 1, and a 4.7% share and 543,000 viewers on Teledeporte. The semifinal versus Djokovic had an average 4.1% share and 517,000 viewers on Teledeporte.
- The Roland Garros final versus Wawrinka had an average 26.6% share and 3,455,000 viewers on Telecinco, and a 3.2% share and 418,000 viewers on Eurosport.
- The US Open final versus Kevin Anderson had an average 4.15% share and 539,000 viewers on Eurosport.

== See also ==
- 2017 ATP World Tour
- 2017 Novak Djokovic tennis season
- 2017 Roger Federer tennis season
- 2017 Andy Murray tennis season
- 2017 Stan Wawrinka tennis season
