= 2017 Rolex Paris Masters – Doubles =

Doubles
- 2017 Rolex Paris Masters

Final
- Champions: (Poland) Łukasz Kubot (Brazil) Marcelo Melo
- Runners-up: (Croatia) Ivan Dodig (Spain) Marcel Granollers
- Score: 7–6^{(7–3)}, 3–6, [10–6]

Details
- Draw: 24
- Seeds: 8

Events
Singles	Doubles
← 2016 ·	Rolex Paris Masters	· 2018 →

Henri Kontinen and John Peers were the defending champions, but lost in the quarterfinals to Ivan Dodig and Marcel Granollers.

Łukasz Kubot and Marcelo Melo won the title, defeating Dodig and Granollers in the final, 7–6^{(7–3)}, 3–6, [10–6]. Melo also regained the ATP no. 1 doubles ranking from Kontinen at the end of the tournament.

== Seeds ==
All seeds received a bye into the second round.

1. (Finland) Henri Kontinen / (Australia) John Peers (quarterfinals)
2. (Poland) Łukasz Kubot / (Brazil) Marcelo Melo (champions)
3. (United States) Bob Bryan / (United States) Mike Bryan (quarterfinals)
4. (France) Pierre-Hugues Herbert / (France) Nicolas Mahut (quarterfinals)
5. (United Kingdom) Jamie Murray / (Brazil) Bruno Soares (semifinals)
6. (Netherlands) Jean-Julien Rojer / (Romania) Horia Tecău (semifinals)
7. (Croatia) Ivan Dodig / (Spain) Marcel Granollers (final)
8. (South Africa) Raven Klaasen / (United States) Rajeev Ram (second round)

== Draw ==
=== Key ===
- Q = Qualifier
- WC = Wild card
- LL = Lucky loser
- Alt = Alternate
- SE = Special exempt
- PR = Protected ranking
- ITF = ITF entry
- JE = Junior exempt
- w/o = Walkover
- r = Retired
- d = Defaulted
- SR = Special ranking

=== Finals ===
Semifinals
7	(Croatia) Ivan Dodig (Spain) Marcel Granollers	3	7^{7}	[11]
6	(Netherlands) Jean-Julien Rojer (Romania) Horia Tecău	6	6^{5}	[9]
5	(United Kingdom) Jamie Murray (Brazil) Bruno Soares	4	2
2	(Poland) Łukasz Kubot (Brazil) Marcelo Melo	6	6

Final
7	(Croatia) Ivan Dodig (Spain) Marcel Granollers	6^{3}	6	[6]
2	(Poland) Łukasz Kubot (Brazil) Marcelo Melo	7^{7}	3	[10]

=== Top half ===
First round
WC	(France) P-H Mathieu (France) B Paire	3	4
(United States) N Monroe (United States) J Sock	6	6
(Argentina) D Schwartzman (Spain) F Verdasco	4	6	[13]
(Pakistan) A-u-H Qureshi (Germany) M Zverev	6	3	[11]
(France) F Martin (Spain) A Ramos Viñolas	6	2	[6]
WC	(France) J Benneteau (France) É Roger-Vasselin	2	6	[10]
(Mexico) S González (Chile) J Peralta	7^{9}	7^{8}
(United States) J Isner (United States) S Querrey	6^{7}	6^{6}

Second round
1	(Finland) H Kontinen (Australia) J Peers	7^{7}	6
(United States) N Monroe (United States) J Sock	6^{4}	2
(Argentina) D Schwartzman (Spain) F Verdasco	1	1
7	(Croatia) I Dodig (Spain) M Granollers	6	6
3	(United States) B Bryan (United States) M Bryan	6	7^{7}
WC	(France) J Benneteau (France) É Roger-Vasselin	3	6^{4}
(Mexico) S González (Chile) J Peralta	5	6	[3]
6	(Netherlands) J-J Rojer (Romania) H Tecău	7	3	[10]

Quarterfinals
1	(Finland) H Kontinen (Australia) J Peers	3	4
7	(Croatia) I Dodig (Spain) M Granollers	6	6
3	(United States) B Bryan (United States) M Bryan	1	5
6	(Netherlands) J-J Rojer (Romania) H Tecău	6	7

Semifinals
7	(Croatia) I Dodig (Spain) M Granollers	3	7^{7}	[11]
6	(Netherlands) J-J Rojer (Romania) H Tecău	6	6^{5}	[9]

=== Bottom half ===
First round
(Croatia) N Mektić (Netherlands) M Middelkoop	4	3
(United States) R Harrison (New Zealand) M Venus	6	6
(India) R Bopanna (Uruguay) P Cuevas	2	6^{7}
(Colombia) JS Cabal (Colombia) R Farah	6	7^{9}
(Russia) K Khachanov (Russia) A Rublev	6	4	[6]
(Spain) F López (Spain) M López	4	6	[10]
(Croatia) M Pavić (Serbia) N Zimonjić	6	4	[5]
(France) R Gasquet (France) L Pouille	3	6	[10]

Second round
5	(United Kingdom) J Murray (Brazil) B Soares	6	6
(United States) R Harrison (New Zealand) M Venus	3	4
(Colombia) JS Cabal (Colombia) R Farah	3	5
4	(France) P-H Herbert (France) N Mahut	6	7
8	(South Africa) R Klaasen (United States) R Ram	4	6^{3}
(Spain) F López (Spain) M López	6	7^{7}
(France) R Gasquet (France) L Pouille
2	(Poland) Ł Kubot (Brazil) M Melo	w/o

Quarterfinals
5	(United Kingdom) J Murray (Brazil) B Soares	6	3	[12]
4	(France) P-H Herbert (France) N Mahut	4	6	[10]
(Spain) F López (Spain) M López	3	3
2	(Poland) Ł Kubot (Brazil) M Melo	6	6

Semifinals
5	(United Kingdom) J Murray (Brazil) B Soares	4	2
2	(Poland) Ł Kubot (Brazil) M Melo	6	6
