= 2017 Rolex Paris Masters – Singles =

Singles
- 2017 Rolex Paris Masters

Final
- Champion: (United States) Jack Sock
- Runner-up: (Serbia) Filip Krajinović
- Score: 5–7, 6–4, 6–1

Details
- Draw: 48 (6 Q / 3 WC)
- Seeds: 16

Events
Singles	Doubles
- Rolex Paris Masters

Jack Sock defeated Filip Krajinović in the final, 5–7, 6–4, 6–1 to win the singles tennis title at the 2017 Paris Masters. It was Sock's first Masters 1000 singles title, and he became the first American to win a Masters 1000 singles title since Andy Roddick in 2010. For the first time since 2004, more than three of the year's Masters 1000 singles events were won by players outside the Big Four. The win also catapulted Sock from No. 24 in the Race to London (the competition for the year-end championships) to No. 9, which earned him entry to the 2017 ATP Finals. Sock also entered the top 10 for the first time in his career.

Andy Murray was the reigning champion, but did not participate due to injury. As a result of the withdrawals of Murray and Novak Djokovic from the tournament, they fell outside the top-10 in the ATP rankings for the first time since September 22, 2014 and March 5, 2007, respectively.

Krajinović became the lowest-ranked player to reach a Masters 1000 singles final since Andrei Pavel in 2003 and the first qualifier to achieve the feat since Jerzy Janowicz in 2012.

Sock defeated a qualifier in the final and a wild card in the semifinals, replicating a feat that David Ferrer did at the 2012 Paris Masters five years earlier.

By winning his first match, Rafael Nadal secured the year-end world No. 1 singles ranking for the fourth time in his career.

== Seeds ==
All seeds receive a bye into the second round.

1. (Spain) Rafael Nadal (quarterfinals, withdrew with knee injury)
2. (Switzerland) ~~Roger Federer~~ (withdrew)
3. (Croatia) Marin Čilić (quarterfinals)
4. (Germany) Alexander Zverev (second round)
5. (Austria) Dominic Thiem (third round)
6. (Bulgaria) Grigor Dimitrov (third round)
7. (Belgium) David Goffin (third round)
8. (Spain) Pablo Carreño Busta (second round)
9. (United States) John Isner (semifinals)
10. (United States) Sam Querrey (second round)
11. (France) Jo-Wilfried Tsonga (second round)
12. (South Africa) Kevin Anderson (second round)
13. (Argentina) Juan Martín del Potro (quarterfinals)
14. (Spain) Roberto Bautista Agut (third round)
15. (Spain) Albert Ramos Viñolas (second round)
16. (United States) Jack Sock (champion)
17. (France) Lucas Pouille (third round)

Click on the seed number of a player to go to their draw section.

== Draw ==
Key

- Q = Qualifier
- WC = Wild card
- LL = Lucky loser
- Alt = Alternate
- ITF = ITF entry
- PR = Protected ranking
- SR = Special ranking
- SE = Special exempt
- JE = Junior exempt
- JR = Junior Accelerator Programme entrant
- CO = College Accelerator Programme entrant
- NG = Next Gen Accelerator Program entrant
- w/o = Walkover
- r = Retired
- d = Defaulted

=== Finals ===
Quarterfinals
1	(Spain) Rafael Nadal
Q	(Serbia) Filip Krajinović	w/o
13	(Argentina) Juan Martín del Potro	4	7^{7}	4
9	(United States) John Isner	6	6^{5}	6
WC	(France) Julien Benneteau	7^{7}	7
3	(Croatia) Marin Čilić	6^{5}	5
(Spain) Fernando Verdasco	7^{7}	2	3
16	(United States) Jack Sock	6^{3}	6	6

Semifinals
Q	(Serbia) Filip Krajinović	6	6^{2}	7^{7}
9	(United States) John Isner	4	7^{7}	6^{5}
WC	(France) Julien Benneteau	5	2
16	(United States) Jack Sock	7	6

Final
Q	(Serbia) Filip Krajinović	7	4	1
16	(United States) Jack Sock	5	6	6

=== Top half ===
==== Section 1 ====
First round
(Germany) M Zverev	0	2
(South Korea) H Chung	6	6
(Uruguay) P Cuevas	6	6
(Russia) K Khachanov	4	2
Q	(Serbia) F Krajinović	6	6
(Japan) Y Sugita	4	2
Q	(Canada) V Pospisil	7	5	6^{4}
WC	(France) N Mahut	5	7	7^{7}

Second round
1	(Spain) R Nadal	7	6
(South Korea) H Chung	5	3
(Uruguay) P Cuevas	6^{5}	7^{7}	6
15	(Spain) A Ramos Viñolas	7^{7}	6^{1}	2
10	(United States) S Querrey	4	4
Q	(Serbia) F Krajinović	6	6
WC	(France) N Mahut	6	6
8	(Spain) P Carreño Busta	4	1

Third round
1	(Spain) R Nadal	6	6^{5}	6
(Uruguay) P Cuevas	3	7^{7}	3
Q	(Serbia) F Krajinović	6	3	6
WC	(France) N Mahut	2	6	1

Quarterfinals
1	(Spain) R Nadal
Q	(Serbia) F Krajinović	w/o

==== Section 2 ====
First round
(United States) S Johnson	2	1
(Netherlands) R Haase	6	6
Q	(Portugal) J Sousa	6	7
(Italy) P Lorenzi	4	5
(Argentina) D Schwartzman	6	6
(Serbia) V Troicki	3	4
(France) R Gasquet	6	4	6
(France) B Paire	3	6	4

Second round
4	(Germany) A Zverev	6	2	2
(Netherlands) R Haase	3	6	6
Q	(Portugal) J Sousa	2	2
13	(Argentina) JM del Potro	6	6
9	(United States) J Isner	7^{7}	6^{11}	6
(Argentina) D Schwartzman	6^{2}	7^{13}	3
(France) R Gasquet	4	4
6	(Bulgaria) G Dimitrov	6	6

Third round
(Netherlands) R Haase	5	4
13	(Argentina) JM del Potro	7	6
9	(United States) J Isner	7^{12}	5	7^{7}
6	(Bulgaria) G Dimitrov	6^{10}	7	6^{3}

Quarterfinals
13	(Argentina) JM del Potro	4	7^{7}	4
9	(United States) J Isner	6	6^{5}	6

=== Bottom half ===
==== Section 3 ====
First round
(France) A Mannarino	6	6
(Spain) D Ferrer	2	4
WC	(France) J Benneteau	6	6
(Canada) D Shapovalov	4	4
(France) G Simon	3	0
Q	(France) J Chardy	6	6
Q	(Germany) J-L Struff	3	4
Q	(Croatia) B Ćorić	6	6

Second round
7	(Belgium) D Goffin	6	2	6
(France) A Mannarino	2	6	3
WC	(France) J Benneteau	2	7^{7}	6
11	(France) J-W Tsonga	6	6^{4}	2
14	(Spain) R Bautista Agut	6	6
Q	(France) J Chardy	4	1
Q	(Croatia) B Ćorić	4	3
3	(Croatia) M Čilić	6	6

Third round
7	(Belgium) D Goffin	3	3
WC	(France) J Benneteau	6	6
14	(Spain) R Bautista Agut	6^{4}	2
3	(Croatia) M Čilić	7^{7}	6

Quarterfinals
WC	(France) J Benneteau	7^{7}	7
3	(Croatia) M Čilić	6^{5}	5

==== Section 4 ====
First round
(United States) R Harrison	6^{5}	3
LL	(Germany) P Gojowczyk	7^{7}	6
(Spain) F Verdasco	7^{7}	7^{8}
(Russia) A Rublev	6^{1}	6^{6}
(United Kingdom) K Edmund	5	7^{9}	6
LL	(Russia) E Donskoy	7	6^{7}	3
WC	(France) P-H Herbert	6^{4}	3
(Spain) F López	7^{7}	6

Second round
5	(Austria) D Thiem	6	6^{3}	6
LL	(Germany) P Gojowczyk	4	7^{7}	4
(Spain) F Verdasco	5	6	7
12	(South Africa) K Anderson	7	4	5
16	(United States) J Sock	4	7^{7}	7^{7}
(United Kingdom) K Edmund	6	6^{4}	6^{5}
(Spain) F López	3	4
17	(France) L Pouille	6	6

Third round
5	(Austria) D Thiem	4	4
(Spain) F Verdasco	6	6
16	(United States) J Sock	7^{8}	6
17	(France) L Pouille	6^{6}	3

Quarterfinals
(Spain) F Verdasco	7^{7}	2	3
16	(United States) J Sock	6^{3}	6	6

== Qualifying ==
=== Seeds ===
1. (United States) Jared Donaldson (first round)
2. (Germany) Jan-Lennard Struff (qualified)
3. (Georgia (country)) Nikoloz Basilashvili (first round)
4. (Croatia) Borna Ćorić (qualified)
5. (Uzbekistan) Denis Istomin (first round, retired)
6. (Portugal) João Sousa (qualified)
7. (Argentina) Guido Pella (first round)
8. (Russia) Daniil Medvedev (first round)
9. (Germany) Peter Gojowczyk (qualifying competition, lucky loser)
10. (Serbia) Dušan Lajović (first round)
11. (Italy) Thomas Fabbiano (first round)
12. (Russia) Evgeny Donskoy (qualifying competition, lucky loser)

=== Qualifiers ===
1. (France) Jérémy Chardy
2. (Germany) Jan-Lennard Struff
3. (Canada) Vasek Pospisil
4. (Croatia) Borna Ćorić
5. (Serbia) Filip Krajinović
6. (Portugal) João Sousa

=== Lucky losers ===
1. (Germany) Peter Gojowczyk
2. (Russia) Evgeny Donskoy

=== Qualifying draw ===
==== First qualifier ====
First round
1	(United States) Jared Donaldson	5	7^{7}	4
Alt	(Spain) Guillermo García López	7	6^{0}	6
(France) Jérémy Chardy	6^{4}	6	6
10	(Serbia) Dušan Lajović	7^{7}	2	4

Qualifying competition
Alt	(Spain) Guillermo García López	3	4
(France) Jérémy Chardy	6	6

==== Second qualifier ====
First round
2	(Germany) Jan-Lennard Struff	7^{7}	6
(Kazakhstan) Mikhail Kukushkin	6^{5}	4
WC	(France) Quentin Halys	4	3
9	(Germany) Peter Gojowczyk	6	6

Qualifying competition
2	(Germany) Jan-Lennard Struff	6	7^{7}
9	(Germany) Peter Gojowczyk	3	6^{4}

==== Third qualifier ====
First round
3	(Georgia (country)) Nikoloz Basilashvili	6	3	2
(Canada) Vasek Pospisil	2	6	6
WC	(France) Paul-Henri Mathieu	6	6
8	(Russia) Daniil Medvedev	4	4

Qualifying competition
(Canada) Vasek Pospisil	6	6
WC	(France) Paul-Henri Mathieu	3	4

==== Fourth qualifier ====
First round
4	(Croatia) Borna Ćorić	6	6
WC	(France) Benjamin Bonzi	4	3
(Italy) Andreas Seppi	3	2
12	(Russia) Evgeny Donskoy	6	6

Qualifying competition
4	(Croatia) Borna Ćorić	6	6
12	(Russia) Evgeny Donskoy	2	3

==== Fifth qualifier ====
First round
5	(Uzbekistan) Denis Istomin	1	3^{r}
(Serbia) Laslo Đere	6	3
(Serbia) Filip Krajinović	6	6
7	(Argentina) Guido Pella	4	1

Qualifying competition
(Serbia) Laslo Đere	7	3	2
(Serbia) Filip Krajinović	5	6	6

==== Sixth qualifier ====
First round
6	(Portugal) João Sousa	6	6
(Slovakia) Norbert Gombos	4	3
WC	(France) Ugo Humbert	4	6	6
11	(Italy) Thomas Fabbiano	6	3	4

Qualifying competition
6	(Portugal) João Sousa	7	6
WC	(France) Ugo Humbert	5	4
