= 2016 BNP Paribas Masters =

- Date: 29 October – 6 November
- Edition: 44th
- Category: World Tour Masters 1000
- Draw: 48S / 24D
- Prize money: €3,748,925
- Surface: Hard / indoor
- Location: Paris, France
- Venue: Palais omnisports de Paris-Bercy

Champions

Singles
- (United Kingdom) Andy Murray

Doubles
- (Finland) Henri Kontinen / (Australia) John Peers
← 2015 ·	Paris Masters	· 2017 →

The 2016 BNP Paribas Masters was a professional men's tennis tournament played on indoor hard courts. It was the 44th edition of the tournament, and part of the World Tour Masters 1000 category of the 2016 ATP World Tour. It took place at the Palais omnisports de Paris-Bercy in Paris, France, between 29 October and 6 November 2016. Second-seeded Andy Murray won the singles title.

== Points and prize money ==
=== Point distribution ===
Event	W	F	SF	QF	Round of 16	Round of 32	Round of 64	Q	Q2	Q1
Singles	1,000	600	360	180	90	45	10	25	16	0
Doubles	1,000	600	360	180	90	0	—	—	—	—

=== Prize money ===
Event	W	F	SF	QF	Round of 16	Round of 32	Round of 64	Q2	Q1
Singles	€746,550	€366,035	€184,230	€93,680	€48,645	€25,650	€13,845	€3,065	€1,560
Doubles	€222,150	€108,750	€54,550	€28,000	€14,470	€7,640	—	—	—

== Singles main-draw entrants ==
=== Seeds ===
Country	Player	Rank^{1}	Seed
SRB	Novak Djokovic	1	1
GBR	Andy Murray	2	2
SUI	Stan Wawrinka	3	3
CAN	Milos Raonic	4	4
JPN	Kei Nishikori	5	5
AUT	Dominic Thiem	9	6
CZE	Tomáš Berdych	10	7
BEL	David Goffin	11	8
CRO	Marin Čilić	12	9
ESP	Roberto Bautista Agut	14	10
FRA	Jo-Wilfried Tsonga	15	11
FRA	Richard Gasquet	16	12
FRA	Lucas Pouille	17	13
BUL	Grigor Dimitrov	18	14
ESP	David Ferrer	19	15
URU	Pablo Cuevas	21	16

- ^{1} Rankings are as of 24 October 2016

=== Other entrants ===
The following players received wildcards into the singles main draw:

- (France) Adrian Mannarino
- (France) Paul-Henri Mathieu
- (France) Stéphane Robert

The following players received entry from the qualifying draw:

- (France) Julien Benneteau
- (Netherlands) Robin Haase
- (France) Pierre-Hugues Herbert
- (Serbia) Dušan Lajović
- (Italy) Andreas Seppi
- (Germany) Jan-Lennard Struff

The following player received entry as a special exempt:

- (Germany) Mischa Zverev

=== Withdrawals ===
Before the tournament

- (Switzerland) Roger Federer (knee injury) →replaced by (Spain) Pablo Carreño Busta
- (Australia) Nick Kyrgios (suspended) →replaced by (Italy) Fabio Fognini
- (France) Gaël Monfils →replaced by (Argentina) Guido Pella
- (Spain) Rafael Nadal (wrist injury) →replaced by (Ukraine) Illya Marchenko
- (United States) Sam Querrey →replaced by (France) Nicolas Mahut
- (Australia) Bernard Tomic →replaced by (Spain) Fernando Verdasco
- (Germany) Alexander Zverev →replaced by (Spain) Nicolás Almagro

== Doubles main-draw entrants ==
=== Seeds ===
Country	Player	Country	Player	Rank^{1}	Seed
FRA	Pierre-Hugues Herbert	FRA	Nicolas Mahut	4	1
GBR	Jamie Murray	BRA	Bruno Soares	6	2
USA	Bob Bryan	USA	Mike Bryan	10	3
NED	Jean-Julien Rojer	ROU	Horia Tecău	19	4
ESP	Feliciano López	ESP	Marc López	23	5
BRA	Marcelo Melo	CAN	Vasek Pospisil	24	6
RSA	Raven Klaasen	USA	Rajeev Ram	32	7
IND	Rohan Bopanna	CAN	Daniel Nestor	40	8

- Rankings are as of 24 October 2016

=== Other entrants ===
The following pairs received wildcards into the doubles main draw:

- (France) Jonathan Eysseric / (France) Tristan Lamasine
- (France) Quentin Halys / (France) Adrian Mannarino

== Finals ==
=== Singles ===
- (United Kingdom) Andy Murray defeated (United States) John Isner, 6–3, 6–7^{(4–7)}, 6–4

=== Doubles ===
- (Finland) Henri Kontinen / (Australia) John Peers defeated (France) Pierre-Hugues Herbert / (France) Nicolas Mahut, 6–4, 3–6, [10–6]
