= 2017 Rolex Paris Masters =

- Date: 30 October – 5 November
- Edition: 45th
- Category: World Tour Masters 1000
- Draw: 48S / 24D
- Prize money: €4,273,775
- Surface: Hard / indoor
- Location: Paris, France
- Venue: Palais omnisports de Paris-Bercy

Champions

Singles
- (United States) Jack Sock

Doubles
- (Poland) Łukasz Kubot / (Brazil) Marcelo Melo
← 2016 ·	Paris Masters	· 2018 →

The 2017 Rolex Paris Masters was a professional men's tennis tournament played on indoor hard courts. It was the 45th edition of the tournament, and part of the World Tour Masters 1000 category of the 2017 ATP World Tour. It took place at the Palais omnisports de Paris-Bercy in Paris, France, between 30 October and 5 November 2017. The event was the final professional tennis tournament for French player Paul-Henri Mathieu, who received wildcards into the singles qualifying and doubles draws.

== Points and prize money ==
=== Point distribution ===
Event	W	F	SF	QF	Round of 16	Round of 32	Round of 64	Q	Q2	Q1
Singles	1,000	600	360	180	90	45	10	25	16	0
Doubles	1,000	600	360	180	90	0	—	—	—	—

=== Prize money ===
Event	W	F	SF	QF	Round of 16	Round of 32	Round of 64	Q2	Q1
Singles	€853,430	€418,450	€210,610	€107,095	€55,610	€29,320	€15,830	€3,505	€1,785
Doubles	€253,950	€124,330	€62,360	€32,010	€16,550	€8,730	—	—	—

== Singles main-draw entrants ==
=== Seeds ===
The following are the seeded players. Seedings are based on ATP rankings as of 23 October 2017. Rankings and points before are as of 30 October 2017. Points defending include points from the 2016 ATP World Tour Finals, which will be dropped at the end of the tournament.

Seed	Rank	Player	Points before	Points defending	Points won	Points after	Status
1	1	(Spain) Rafael Nadal	10,465	0	180	10,645	Quarterfinals withdrew due to knee injury
~~2~~	~~2~~	~~(Switzerland) Roger Federer~~	9,005	0	0	9,005	Withdrew due to back injury
3	5	(Croatia) Marin Čilić	4,185	360+200	180	3,805	Quarterfinals lost to (France) Julien Benneteau [WC]
4	4	(Germany) Alexander Zverev	4,400	0	10	4,410	Second round lost to (Netherlands) Robin Haase
5	6	(Austria) Dominic Thiem	3,935	10+200	90	3,815	Third round lost to (Spain) Fernando Verdasco
6	8	(Bulgaria) Grigor Dimitrov	3,650	90	90	3,650	Third round lost to (United States) John Isner [9]
7	10	(Belgium) David Goffin	2,975	90	90	2,975	Third round lost to (France) Julien Benneteau [WC]
8	11	(Spain) Pablo Carreño Busta	2,650	45	10	2,615	Second round lost to (France) Nicolas Mahut [WC]
9	14	(United States) John Isner	2,505	600	360	2,265	Semifinals lost to (Serbia) Filip Krajinović [Q]
10	13	(United States) Sam Querrey	2,525	0	10	2,535	Second round lost to (Serbia) Filip Krajinović [Q]
11	15	(France) Jo-Wilfried Tsonga	2,490	180	10	2,320	Second round lost to (France) Julien Benneteau [WC]
12	16	(South Africa) Kevin Anderson	2,470	0	10	2,480	Second round lost to (Spain) Fernando Verdasco
13	17	(Argentina) Juan Martín del Potro	2,435	0	180	2,615	Quarterfinals lost to (United States) John Isner [9]
14	23	(Spain) Roberto Bautista Agut	1,935	10	90	2,015	Third round lost to (Croatia) Marin Čilić [3]
15	24	(Spain) Albert Ramos Viñolas	1,880	45	10	1,845	Second round lost to (Uruguay) Pablo Cuevas
16	22	(United States) Jack Sock	1,945	180	1,000	2,765	Champion, defeated (Serbia) Filip Krajinović [Q]
17	18	(France) Lucas Pouille	2,235	90	90	2,235	Third round lost to (United States) Jack Sock [16]

=== Other entrants ===
The following players received wildcards into the singles main draw:

- (France) Julien Benneteau
- (France) Pierre-Hugues Herbert
- (France) Nicolas Mahut

The following players received entry from the qualifying draw:

- (France) Jérémy Chardy
- (Croatia) Borna Ćorić
- (Serbia) Filip Krajinović
- (Canada) Vasek Pospisil
- (Portugal) João Sousa
- (Germany) Jan-Lennard Struff

The following players received entry as a lucky loser:

- (Russia) Evgeny Donskoy
- (Germany) Peter Gojowczyk

=== Withdrawals ===
Before the tournament

- (Czech Republic) Tomáš Berdych →replaced by (United Kingdom) Kyle Edmund
- (Serbia) Novak Djokovic →replaced by (Netherlands) Robin Haase
- (Switzerland) Roger Federer →replaced by (Russia) Evgeny Donskoy
- (Italy) Fabio Fognini →replaced by (Serbia) Viktor Troicki
- (Germany) Philipp Kohlschreiber →replaced by (United States) Ryan Harrison
- (Australia) Nick Kyrgios →replaced by (South Korea) Chung Hyeon
- (France) Gaël Monfils →replaced by (Germany) Peter Gojowczyk
- (Luxembourg) Gilles Müller →replaced by (Japan) Yūichi Sugita
- (United Kingdom) Andy Murray →replaced by (France) Gilles Simon
- (Japan) Kei Nishikori →replaced by (France) Benoît Paire
- (Canada) Milos Raonic →replaced by (United States) Steve Johnson
- (Switzerland) Stan Wawrinka →replaced by (Spain) Fernando Verdasco

== Doubles main-draw entrants ==
=== Seeds ===
Country	Player	Country	Player	Rank^{1}	Seed
FIN	Henri Kontinen	AUS	John Peers	3	1
POL	Łukasz Kubot	BRA	Marcelo Melo	7	2
USA	Bob Bryan	USA	Mike Bryan	12	3
FRA	Pierre-Hugues Herbert	FRA	Nicolas Mahut	13	4
GBR	Jamie Murray	BRA	Bruno Soares	19	5
NED	Jean-Julien Rojer	ROU	Horia Tecău	23	6
CRO	Ivan Dodig	ESP	Marcel Granollers	28	7
RSA	Raven Klaasen	USA	Rajeev Ram	34	8

- ^{1} Rankings are as of 23 October 2017

=== Other entrants ===
The following pairs received wildcards into the doubles main draw:

- (France) Julien Benneteau / (France) Édouard Roger-Vasselin
- (France) Paul-Henri Mathieu / (France) Benoît Paire

== Finals ==
=== Singles ===
- (United States) Jack Sock defeated (Serbia) Filip Krajinović, 5–7, 6–4, 6–1

=== Doubles ===
- (Poland) Łukasz Kubot / (Brazil) Marcelo Melo defeated (Croatia) Ivan Dodig / (Spain) Marcel Granollers, 7–6^{(7–3)}, 3–6, [10–6]
