= 2016 BNP Paribas Masters – Doubles =

Doubles
- 2016 BNP Paribas Masters

Final
- Champions: (Finland) Henri Kontinen (Australia) John Peers
- Runners-up: (France) Pierre-Hugues Herbert (France) Nicolas Mahut
- Score: 6–4, 3–6, [10–6]

Details
- Draw: 24
- Seeds: 8

Events
Singles	Doubles
← 2015 ·	BNP Paribas Masters	· 2017 →

Ivan Dodig and Marcelo Melo were the defending champions, but Dodig chose not to participate this year. Melo played alongside Vasek Pospisil, but lost to John Peers and Henri Kontinen in the semifinals.

Kontinen and Peers won the title, defeating top seeds Pierre-Hugues Herbert and Nicolas Mahut in the final, 6–4, 3–6, [10–6].

== Seeds ==
All seeds received a bye into the second round.

1. (France) Pierre-Hugues Herbert / (France) Nicolas Mahut (final)
2. (United Kingdom) Jamie Murray / (Brazil) Bruno Soares (second round)
3. (United States) Bob Bryan / (United States) Mike Bryan (quarterfinals)
4. (Netherlands) Jean-Julien Rojer / (Romania) Horia Tecău (second round)
5. (Spain) Feliciano López / (Spain) Marc López (quarterfinals)
6. (Brazil) Marcelo Melo / (Canada) Vasek Pospisil (semifinals)
7. (South Africa) Raven Klaasen / (United States) Rajeev Ram (second round)
8. (India) Rohan Bopanna / (Canada) Daniel Nestor (semifinals)

== Draw ==
=== Key ===
- Q = Qualifier
- WC = Wild card
- LL = Lucky loser
- Alt = Alternate
- SE = Special exempt
- PR = Protected ranking
- ITF = ITF entry
- JE = Junior exempt
- w/o = Walkover
- r = Retired
- d = Defaulted
- SR = Special ranking

=== Finals ===
Semifinals
1	(France) Pierre-Hugues Herbert (France) Nicolas Mahut	6	3	[10]
8	(India) Rohan Bopanna (Canada) Daniel Nestor	4	6	[6]
(Finland) Henri Kontinen (Australia) John Peers	6	6
6	(Brazil) Marcelo Melo (Canada) Vasek Pospisil	4	4

Final
1	(France) Pierre-Hugues Herbert (France) Nicolas Mahut	4	6	[6]
(Finland) Henri Kontinen (Australia) John Peers	6	3	[10]

=== Top half ===
First round
(France) F Martin (France) G Simon	4	7^{7}	[7]
(Slovakia) M Kližan (Portugal) J Sousa	6	6^{2}	[10]
(France) J Benneteau (France) É Roger-Vasselin	2	6	[10]
(Uruguay) P Cuevas (Spain) D Marrero	6	0	[6]
(United Kingdom) D Inglot (Poland) M Matkowski	2	3
(United States) N Monroe (United States) J Sock	6	6
WC	(France) J Eysseric (France) T Lamasine	5	6	[7]
(France) L Pouille (France) J-W Tsonga	7	3	[10]

Second round
1	(France) P-H Herbert (France) N Mahut	6	6
(Slovakia) M Kližan (Portugal) J Sousa	2	2
(France) J Benneteau (France) É Roger-Vasselin	3	4
5	(Spain) F López (Spain) M López	6	6
4	(Netherlands) J-J Rojer (Romania) H Tecău	6	3	[7]
(United States) N Monroe (United States) J Sock	2	6	[10]
(France) L Pouille (France) J-W Tsonga	6^{6}	7^{7}	[12]
8	(India) R Bopanna (Canada) D Nestor	7^{8}	6^{2}	[14]

Quarterfinals
1	(France) P-H Herbert (France) N Mahut	6	6^{5}	[10]
5	(Spain) F López (Spain) M López	3	7^{7}	[6]
(United States) N Monroe (United States) J Sock	6	3	[5]
8	(India) R Bopanna (Canada) D Nestor	2	6	[10]

Semifinals
1	(France) P-H Herbert (France) N Mahut	6	3	[10]
8	(India) R Bopanna (Canada) D Nestor	4	6	[6]

=== Bottom half ===
First round
(Finland) H Kontinen (Australia) J Peers	6	6
(Philippines) T Huey (Belarus) M Mirnyi	2	2
WC	(France) Q Halys (France) A Mannarino	6	6
(Serbia) N Djokovic (Serbia) N Zimonjić	3	4
(Italy) P Lorenzi (Spain) A Ramos Viñolas	1	5
(Germany) P Kohlschreiber (Austria) D Thiem	6	7
(Bulgaria) G Dimitrov (Pakistan) A-u-H Qureshi	6	7^{7}
(Colombia) JS Cabal (Colombia) R Farah	2	6^{5}

Second round
7	(South Africa) R Klaasen (United States) R Ram	4	6^{4}
(Finland) H Kontinen (Australia) J Peers	6	7^{7}
WC	(France) Q Halys (France) A Mannarino	4	4
3	(United States) B Bryan (United States) M Bryan	6	6
6	(Brazil) M Melo (Canada) V Pospisil	6	6
(Germany) P Kohlschreiber (Austria) D Thiem	3	4
(Bulgaria) G Dimitrov (Pakistan) A-u-H Qureshi	6	3	[10]
2	(United Kingdom) J Murray (Brazil) B Soares	4	6	[6]

Quarterfinals
(Finland) H Kontinen (Australia) J Peers	6	6
3	(United States) B Bryan (United States) M Bryan	4	2
6	(Brazil) M Melo (Canada) V Pospisil	3	6	[10]
(Bulgaria) G Dimitrov (Pakistan) A-u-H Qureshi	6	3	[8]

Semifinals
(Finland) H Kontinen (Australia) J Peers	6	6
6	(Brazil) M Melo (Canada) V Pospisil	4	4
