= 2017 Shanghai Rolex Masters =

- Date: October 8–15
- Edition: 9th
- Category: ATP World Tour Masters 1000
- Surface: Hard / Outdoor
- Location: Shanghai, China
- Venue: Qizhong Forest Sports City Arena

Champions

Singles
- (Switzerland) Roger Federer

Doubles
- (Finland) Henri Kontinen / (Australia) John Peers
← 2016 ·	Shanghai Masters	· 2018 →

The 2017 Shanghai Rolex Masters was a tennis tournament played on outdoor hard courts. It was the ninth edition of the Shanghai ATP Masters 1000, classified as an ATP World Tour Masters 1000 event on the 2017 ATP World Tour. It was taking place at Qizhong Forest Sports City Arena in Shanghai, China from October 8 to 15, 2017.

== Points and prize money ==
=== Point distribution ===
Event	W	F	SF	QF	Round of 16	Round of 32	Round of 64	Q	Q2	Q1
Singles	1,000	600	360	180	90	45	10	25	16	0
Doubles	1,000	600	360	180	90	0	—	—	—	—

=== Prize money ===
Event	W	F	SF	QF	Round of 16	Round of 32	Round of 64	Q2	Q1
Singles	$1,192,780	$584,845	$294,345	$149,675	$77,720	$40,975	$22,125	$5,100	$2,595
Doubles	$369,380	$180,840	$90,710	$46,560	$24,070	$12,700	—	—	—

== Singles main-draw entrants ==
=== Seeds ===
The following are the seeded players. Seedings are based on ATP rankings as of October 2, 2017. Rankings and points before are as of October 9, 2017.

Seed	Rank	Player	Points before	Points defending	Points won	Points after	Status
1	1	(Spain) Rafael Nadal	9,875	10	600	10,465	Runner-up, lost to (Switzerland) Roger Federer [2]
2	2	(Switzerland) Roger Federer	7,505	0	1,000	8,505	Champion, defeated (Spain) Rafael Nadal [1]
3	4	(Germany) Alexander Zverev	4,400	90	90	4,400	Third round lost to (Argentina) Juan Martín del Potro [16]
4	5	(Croatia) Marin Čilić	4,155	10	360	4,505	Semifinals lost to (Spain) Rafael Nadal [1]
5	7	(Austria) Dominic Thiem	3,925	0	10	3,935	Second round lost to (Serbia) Viktor Troicki
6	9	(Bulgaria) Grigor Dimitrov	3,455	45	180	3,590	Quarterfinals lost to (Spain) Rafael Nadal [1]
7	11	(Spain) Pablo Carreño Busta	2,855	10	10	2,855	Second round lost to (Spain) Albert Ramos Viñolas
8	10	(Belgium) David Goffin	3,055	180	10	2,885	Second round lost to (France) Gilles Simon
9	13	(Spain) Roberto Bautista Agut	2,525	600	10	1,935	First round lost to (South Korea) Chung Hyeon
10	17	(United States) Sam Querrey	2,445	10	90	2,525	Third round lost to (Bulgaria) Grigor Dimitrov [6]
11	15	(South Africa) Kevin Anderson	2,470	45	45	2,470	Second round lost to (Germany) Jan-Lennard Struff
12	16	(United States) John Isner	2,470	10	90	2,550	Third round lost to (Serbia) Viktor Troicki
13	21	(Australia) Nick Kyrgios	2,045	45	10	2,010	First round retired against (United States) Steve Johnson
14	20	(United States) Jack Sock	2,175	180	10	2,005	First round lost to (Ukraine) Alexandr Dolgopolov [Q]
15	24	(France) Lucas Pouille	1,825	90	45	1,780	Second round lost to (Italy) Fabio Fognini
16	23	(Argentina) Juan Martín del Potro	1,865	0	360	2,225	Semifinals lost to (Switzerland) Roger Federer [2]

=== Other entrants ===
The following players received wildcards into the singles main draw:

- (Canada) Denis Shapovalov
- (China) Wu Di
- (China) Wu Yibing
- (China) Zhang Ze

The following players received entry from the qualifying draw:

- (Georgia (country)) Nikoloz Basilashvili
- (France) Jérémy Chardy
- (Ukraine) Alexandr Dolgopolov
- (Serbia) Dušan Lajović
- (Australia) Jordan Thompson
- (United States) Frances Tiafoe
- (Greece) Stefanos Tsitsipas

=== Withdrawals ===
Before the tournament

- (Czech Republic) Tomáš Berdych →replaced by (Bosnia and Herzegovina) Damir Džumhur
- (Serbia) Novak Djokovic →replaced by (United States) Steve Johnson
- (Spain) David Ferrer →replaced by (Portugal) João Sousa
- (Germany) Philipp Kohlschreiber →replaced by (Serbia) Viktor Troicki
- (France) Gaël Monfils →replaced by (United States) Jared Donaldson
- (Luxembourg) Gilles Müller →replaced by (Germany) Jan-Lennard Struff
- (United Kingdom) Andy Murray →replaced by (United Kingdom) Aljaž Bedene
- (Japan) Kei Nishikori →replaced by (South Korea) Chung Hyeon
- (Canada) Milos Raonic →replaced by (Russia) Andrey Rublev
- (France) Jo-Wilfried Tsonga →replaced by (Russia) Daniil Medvedev
- (Switzerland) Stan Wawrinka →replaced by (United States) Ryan Harrison

=== Retirements ===
- (United Kingdom) Aljaž Bedene
- (Australia) Nick Kyrgios
- (United States) Jack Sock
- (Germany) Mischa Zverev

== Doubles main-draw entrants ==
=== Seeds ===
Country	Player	Country	Player	Rank^{1}	Seed
FIN	Henri Kontinen	AUS	John Peers	3	1
POL	Łukasz Kubot	BRA	Marcelo Melo	7	2
NED	Jean-Julien Rojer	ROU	Horia Tecău	19	3
GBR	Jamie Murray	BRA	Bruno Soares	23	4
CRO	Ivan Dodig	ESP	Marcel Granollers	27	5
RSA	Raven Klaasen	USA	Rajeev Ram	34	6
AUT	Oliver Marach	CRO	Mate Pavić	39	7
USA	Ryan Harrison	NZL	Michael Venus	40	8

- Rankings are as of October 2, 2017

=== Other entrants ===
The following pairs received wildcards into the doubles main draw:

- (China) Gong Maoxin / (China) Zhang Ze
- (China) Wu Di / (China) Wu Yibing

=== Withdrawals ===
Before the tournament

- (United States) Jack Sock

During the tournament

- (Australia) Nick Kyrgios

== Champions ==
=== Singles ===
- (Switzerland) Roger Federer def. (Spain) Rafael Nadal, 6–4, 6–3

=== Doubles ===
- (Finland) Henri Kontinen / (Australia) John Peers def. (Poland) Łukasz Kubot / (Brazil) Marcelo Melo 6–4, 6–2
