= 2016 BNP Paribas Masters – Singles =

Singles
- 2016 BNP Paribas Masters

Final
- Champion: (United Kingdom) Andy Murray
- Runner-up: (United States) John Isner
- Score: 6–3, 6–7^{(4–7)}, 6–4

Details
- Draw: 48 (6 Q / 3 WC)
- Seeds: 16

Events
Singles	Doubles
- BNP Paribas Masters

Andy Murray defeated John Isner in the final, 6–3, 6–7^{(4–7)}, 6–4 to win the singles tennis title at the 2016 Paris Masters. It was his 14th and final Masters 1000 title. By reaching the final, Murray secured the world No. 1 ranking for the first time in his career.

Novak Djokovic was the three-time defending champion, but lost to Marin Čilić in the quarterfinals.

As a result of Roger Federer's withdrawal from the tournament, he fell outside of the top 10 in the ATP rankings for the first time since 13 May 2002.

== Seeds ==
All seeds receive a bye into the second round.

1. (Serbia) Novak Djokovic (quarterfinals)
2. (United Kingdom) Andy Murray (champion)
3. (Switzerland) Stan Wawrinka (second round)
4. (Canada) Milos Raonic (semifinals, withdrew with a torn right quadricep)
5. (Japan) Kei Nishikori (third round)
6. (Austria) Dominic Thiem (second round)
7. (Czech Republic) Tomáš Berdych (quarterfinals)
8. (Belgium) David Goffin (third round)

9. (Croatia) Marin Čilić (semifinals)
10. (Spain) Roberto Bautista Agut (second round)
11. (France) Jo-Wilfried Tsonga (quarterfinals)
12. (France) Richard Gasquet (third round)
13. (France) Lucas Pouille (third round)
14. (Bulgaria) Grigor Dimitrov (third round)
15. (Spain) David Ferrer (second round)
16. (Uruguay) Pablo Cuevas (third round)

Click on the seed number of a player to go to their draw section.

== Draw ==
Key

- Q = Qualifier
- WC = Wild card
- LL = Lucky loser
- Alt = Alternate
- ITF = ITF entry
- PR = Protected ranking
- SR = Special ranking
- SE = Special exempt
- JE = Junior exempt
- JR = Junior Accelerator Programme entrant
- CO = College Accelerator Programme entrant
- NG = Next Gen Accelerator Program entrant
- w/o = Walkover
- r = Retired
- d = Defaulted

=== Finals ===
Quarterfinals
1	(Serbia) Novak Djokovic	4	6^{2}
9	(Croatia) Marin Čilić	6	7^{7}
(United States) John Isner	7^{8}	4	6
(United States) Jack Sock	6^{6}	6	4
11	(France) Jo-Wilfried Tsonga	2	6^{4}
4	(Canada) Milos Raonic	6	7^{7}
7	(Czech Republic) Tomáš Berdych	6^{9}	5
2	(United Kingdom) Andy Murray	7^{11}	7

Semifinals
9	(Croatia) Marin Čilić	4	3
(United States) John Isner	6	6
4	(Canada) Milos Raonic
2	(United Kingdom) Andy Murray	w/o

Final
(United States) John Isner	3	7^{7}	4
2	(United Kingdom) Andy Murray	6	6^{4}	6

=== Top half ===
==== Section 1 ====
First round
(Spain) N Almagro	3	3
(Luxembourg) G Müller	6	6
(Cyprus) M Baghdatis	6	6
WC	(France) P-H Mathieu	2	4
Q	(Serbia) D Lajović	6^{4}	6^{5}
(Croatia) I Karlović	7^{7}	7^{7}
(France) N Mahut	4	6	6
(Slovakia) M Kližan	6	4	3

Second round
1	(Serbia) N Djokovic	6	6
(Luxembourg) G Müller	3	4
(Cyprus) M Baghdatis	3	0^{r}
14	(Bulgaria) G Dimitrov	6	0
9	(Croatia) M Čilić	7^{9}	6
(Croatia) I Karlović	6^{7}	2
(France) N Mahut	6^{5}	3
8	(Belgium) D Goffin	7^{7}	6

Third round
1	(Serbia) N Djokovic	4	6	6
14	(Bulgaria) G Dimitrov	6	2	3
9	(Croatia) M Čilić	6	7^{11}
8	(Belgium) D Goffin	3	6^{9}

Quarterfinals
1	(Serbia) N Djokovic	4	6^{2}
9	(Croatia) M Čilić	6	7^{7}

==== Section 2 ====
First round
Q	(Germany) J-L Struff	6	6
(Ukraine) I Marchenko	1	1
SE	(Germany) M Zverev	6^{8}	4
(United States) J Isner	7^{10}	6
(United States) S Johnson	6	7
(Argentina) G Pella	4	5
(Germany) P Kohlschreiber	2	6^{3}
(United States) J Sock	6	7^{7}

Second round
3	(Switzerland) S Wawrinka	6	6^{6}	6^{1}
Q	(Germany) J-L Struff	3	7^{8}	7^{7}
(United States) J Isner	7^{7}	7^{7}
15	(Spain) D Ferrer	6^{4}	6^{4}
12	(France) R Gasquet	6	7^{13}
(United States) S Johnson	4	6^{11}
(United States) J Sock	6	6
6	(Austria) D Thiem	2	4

Third round
Q	(Germany) J-L Struff	4	7^{7}	3
(United States) J Isner	6	6^{4}	6
12	(France) R Gasquet	2	6	5
(United States) J Sock	6	3	7

Quarterfinals
(United States) J Isner	7^{8}	4	6
(United States) J Sock	6^{6}	6	4

=== Bottom half ===
==== Section 3 ====
First round
(Serbia) V Troicki	6	3	7^{7}
WC	(France) A Mannarino	4	6	6^{5}
(Spain) A Ramos Viñolas	6	6
WC	(France) S Robert	1	4
(France) B Paire	4	6^{4}
(Italy) P Lorenzi	6	7^{7}
(Spain) P Carreño Busta	6	6
(Italy) F Fognini	3	1

Second round
5	(Japan) K Nishikori	6	7
(Serbia) V Troicki	2	5
(Spain) A Ramos Viñolas	3	4
11	(France) J-W Tsonga	6	6
16	(Uruguay) P Cuevas	6	6
(Italy) P Lorenzi	1	2
(Spain) P Carreño Busta	6^{5}	4
4	(Canada) M Raonic	7^{7}	6

Third round
5	(Japan) K Nishikori	6	3	6^{3}
11	(France) J-W Tsonga	0	6	7^{7}
16	(Uruguay) P Cuevas	6	1	2
4	(Canada) M Raonic	4	6	6

Quarterfinals
11	(France) J-W Tsonga	2	6^{4}
4	(Canada) M Raonic	6	7^{7}

==== Section 4 ====
First round
Q	(Italy) A Seppi	4	4
(Portugal) J Sousa	6	6
(France) G Simon	4	6	6
Q	(France) J Benneteau	6	3	2
Q	(France) P-H Herbert	6^{3}	4
(Spain) F López	7^{7}	6
Q	(Netherlands) R Haase	2	2^{r}
(Spain) F Verdasco	6	3

Second round
7	(Czech Republic) T Berdych	6	3	7
(Portugal) J Sousa	3	6	5
(France) G Simon	2	6	7^{8}
10	(Spain) R Bautista Agut	6	1	6^{6}
13	(France) L Pouille	6^{1}	6	6
(Spain) F López	7^{7}	3	4
(Spain) F Verdasco	3	7^{7}	5
2	(United Kingdom) A Murray	6	6^{5}	7

Third round
7	(Czech Republic) T Berdych	6	6
(France) G Simon	4	3
13	(France) L Pouille	3	0
2	(United Kingdom) A Murray	6	6

Quarterfinals
7	(Czech Republic) T Berdych	6^{9}	5
2	(United Kingdom) A Murray	7^{11}	7

== Qualifying ==
=== Seeds ===
1. (Russia) Mikhail Youzhny (first round)
2. (United Kingdom) Daniel Evans (withdrew)
3. (Tunisia) Malek Jaziri (qualifying competition)
4. (Russia) Karen Khachanov (withdrew)
5. (Netherlands) Robin Haase (qualified)
6. (Germany) Dustin Brown (qualifying competition)
7. (United States) Taylor Fritz (first round)
8. (Serbia) Dušan Lajović (qualified)
9. (Spain) Íñigo Cervantes (first round)
10. (Czech Republic) Adam Pavlásek (first round)
11. (Italy) Andreas Seppi (qualified)
12. (Japan) Yūichi Sugita (first round)

=== Qualifiers ===
1. (France) Pierre-Hugues Herbert
2. (Italy) Andreas Seppi
3. (Serbia) Dušan Lajović
4. (Germany) Jan-Lennard Struff
5. (Netherlands) Robin Haase
6. (France) Julien Benneteau

=== Qualifying draw ===
==== First qualifier ====
First round
1	(Russia) Mikhail Youzhny	6	2	2
(France) Pierre-Hugues Herbert	4	6	6
(United States) Ryan Harrison	7^{7}	4	6
7	(United States) Taylor Fritz	6^{4}	6	3

Qualifying competition
(France) Pierre-Hugues Herbert	6	1
(United States) Ryan Harrison	2	0^{r}

==== Second qualifier ====
First round
Alt	(Canada) Vasek Pospisil	6^{5}	6	6^{7}
(Czech Republic) Lukáš Rosol	7^{7}	4	7^{9}
(Lithuania) Ričardas Berankis	3	2
11	(Italy) Andreas Seppi	6	6

Qualifying competition
(Czech Republic) Lukáš Rosol	1	4
11	(Italy) Andreas Seppi	6	6

==== Third qualifier ====
First round
3	(Tunisia) Malek Jaziri	5	7^{7}	6
WC	(France) Quentin Halys	7	6^{1}	4
WC	(France) Vincent Millot	6	4	5
8	(Serbia) Dušan Lajović	4	6	7

Qualifying competition
3	(Tunisia) Malek Jaziri	3	4
8	(Serbia) Dušan Lajović	6	6

==== Fourth qualifier ====
First round
Alt	(Switzerland) Marco Chiudinelli	5	2
(Germany) Jan-Lennard Struff	7	6
(Moldova) Radu Albot	6	6
10	(Czech Republic) Adam Pavlásek	3	2

Qualifying competition
(Germany) Jan-Lennard Struff	6	6
(Moldova) Radu Albot	4	2

==== Fifth qualifier ====
First round
5	(Netherlands) Robin Haase	6	6
WC	(France) Tristan Lamasine	4	4
(Georgia (country)) Nikoloz Basilashvili	6	4	6
9	(Spain) Íñigo Cervantes	0	6	4

Qualifying competition
5	(Netherlands) Robin Haase	7	6
(Georgia (country)) Nikoloz Basilashvili	5	2

==== Sixth qualifier ====
First round
6	(Germany) Dustin Brown	7^{7}	6
(Bosnia and Herzegovina) Damir Džumhur	6^{5}	4
WC	(France) Julien Benneteau	6	4	6
12	(Japan) Yūichi Sugita	1	6	1

Qualifying competition
6	(Germany) Dustin Brown	2	6^{9}
WC	(France) Julien Benneteau	6	7^{11}
