= 2016 Shanghai Rolex Masters – Singles =

Singles
- 2016 Shanghai Rolex Masters

Final
- Champion: (United Kingdom) Andy Murray
- Runner-up: (Spain) Roberto Bautista Agut
- Score: 7−6^{(7−1)}, 6−1

Events
Singles	Doubles
← 2015 ·	Shanghai Masters	· 2017 →

Andy Murray defeated Roberto Bautista Agut in the final, 7−6^{(7−1)}, 6−1 to win the singles tennis title at the 2016 Shanghai Masters. It was his third Shanghai Masters and 13th Masters 1000 title overall.

Novak Djokovic was the defending champion, but lost in the semifinals to Bautista Agut.

== Seeds ==
The top eight seeds receive a bye into the second round.

1. (Serbia) Novak Djokovic (semifinals)
2. (United Kingdom) Andy Murray (champion)
3. (Switzerland) Stan Wawrinka (third round)
4. (Spain) Rafael Nadal (second round)
5. (Canada) Milos Raonic (third round)
6. (France) Gaël Monfils (third round)
7. (Czech Republic) Tomáš Berdych (second round)
8. (Croatia) Marin Čilić (second round)
9. (France) Jo-Wilfried Tsonga (quarterfinals)
10. (Spain) David Ferrer (first round)
11. (Belgium) David Goffin (quarterfinals)
12. (Australia) Nick Kyrgios (second round)
13. (France) Lucas Pouille (third round)
14. (France) Richard Gasquet (first round)
15. (Spain) Roberto Bautista Agut (final)
16. (Uruguay) Pablo Cuevas (first round)

Click on the seed number of a player to go to their draw section.

== Draw ==
=== Key ===
- Q = Qualifier
- WC = Wild card
- LL = Lucky loser
- Alt = Alternate
- SE = Special exempt
- PR = Protected ranking
- ITF = ITF entry
- JE = Junior exempt
- w/o = Walkover
- r = Retired
- d = Defaulted
- SR = Special ranking

=== Finals ===
Quarterfinals
1	(Serbia) Novak Djokovic	3	7^{7}	6
Q	(Germany) Mischa Zverev	6	6^{4}	3
15	(Spain) Roberto Bautista Agut	6	6
9	(France) Jo-Wilfried Tsonga	3	4
(United States) Jack Sock	6	4	6^{5}
(France) Gilles Simon	4	6	7^{7}
11	(Belgium) David Goffin	2	2
2	(United Kingdom) Andy Murray	6	6

Semifinals
1	(Serbia) Novak Djokovic	4	4
15	(Spain) Roberto Bautista Agut	6	6
(France) Gilles Simon	4	3
2	(United Kingdom) Andy Murray	6	6

Final
15	(Spain) Roberto Bautista Agut	6^{1}	1
2	(United Kingdom) Andy Murray	7^{7}	6

=== Top half ===
==== Section 1 ====
First round
(Spain) A Ramos Viñolas	5	3
(Italy) F Fognini	7	6
(Croatia) I Karlović	6^{5}	4
Q	(Canada) V Pospisil	7^{7}	6
(Bulgaria) G Dimitrov	6	6
14	(France) R Gasquet	4	4
12	(Australia) N Kyrgios	6	6
(United States) S Querrey	4	4
WC	(China) Z Zhang	1	2
Q	(Germany) M Zverev	6	6
(Spain) M Granollers	7	7^{7}
Q	(Japan) Y Sugita	5	6^{2}

Second round
1	(Serbia) N Djokovic	6	6
(Italy) F Fognini	3	3
Q	(Canada) V Pospisil	7	7^{7}
(Bulgaria) G Dimitrov	5	6^{2}
12	(Australia) N Kyrgios	3	1
Q	(Germany) M Zverev	6	6
(Spain) M Granollers	7^{7}	7^{7}
7	(Czech Republic) T Berdych	6^{4}	6^{1}

Third round
1	(Serbia) N Djokovic	6	6
Q	(Canada) V Pospisil	4	4
Q	(Germany) M Zverev	6^{4}	6	6
(Spain) M Granollers	7^{7}	4	1

Quarterfinals
1	(Serbia) N Djokovic	3	7^{7}	6
Q	(Germany) M Zverev	6	6^{4}	3

==== Section 2 ====
First round
(Serbia) V Troicki	6	6
Q	(Czech Republic) L Rosol	2	4
Q	(United States) T Fritz	7^{7}	2	6
(France) S Robert	6^{2}	6	3
(Australia) B Tomic	3	0^{r}
15	(Spain) R Bautista Agut	6	3
9	(France) J-W Tsonga	6	6
PR	(Germany) F Mayer	3	2
PR	(Serbia) J Tipsarević	6	6
(Germany) P Kohlschreiber	2	4
(Germany) A Zverev	6	6
(United States) J Isner	4	2

Second round
4	(Spain) R Nadal	3	6^{3}
(Serbia) V Troicki	6	7^{7}
Q	(United States) T Fritz	4	4
15	(Spain) R Bautista Agut	6	6
9	(France) J-W Tsonga	6	7^{8}
PR	(Serbia) J Tipsarević	3	6^{6}
(Germany) A Zverev	3	6	6
8	(Croatia) M Čilić	6	3	2

Third round
(Serbia) V Troicki	3	3
15	(Spain) R Bautista Agut	6	6
9	(France) J-W Tsonga	6^{4}	6	7
(Germany) A Zverev	7^{7}	2	5

Quarterfinals
15	(Spain) R Bautista Agut	6	6
9	(France) J-W Tsonga	3	4

=== Bottom half ===
==== Section 3 ====
First round
(Spain) G García López	7	6^{2}	3
(Italy) P Lorenzi	5	7^{7}	6
(Argentina) G Pella	6^{3}	5
(United States) J Sock	7^{7}	7
(Spain) F López	7^{7}	4	7^{7}
10	(Spain) D Ferrer	6^{3}	6	6^{4}
16	(Uruguay) P Cuevas	3	6	6^{2}
WC	(China) D Wu	6	4	7^{7}
(France) G Simon	6	6
(Spain) P Carreño Busta	0	3
Q	(United Kingdom) K Edmund	6	5	6
(Argentina) F Delbonis	3	7	4

Second round
5	(Canada) M Raonic	6	6
(Italy) P Lorenzi	2	4
(United States) J Sock	6	4	6
(Spain) F López	3	6	4
WC	(China) D Wu	2	2
(France) G Simon	6	6
Q	(United Kingdom) K Edmund	3	4
3	(Switzerland) S Wawrinka	6	6

Third round
5	(Canada) M Raonic	6	4	6^{8}
(United States) J Sock	0	6	7^{10}
(France) G Simon	6	6
3	(Switzerland) S Wawrinka	4	4

Quarterfinals
(United States) J Sock	6	4	6^{5}
(France) G Simon	4	6	7^{7}

==== Section 4 ====
First round
(South Africa) K Anderson	6	6
WC	(China) Z Li	1	3
(Portugal) J Sousa	3	7	1
(France) B Paire	6	5	6
WC	(Argentina) JM del Potro	6	3	5
11	(Belgium) D Goffin	4	6	7
13	(France) L Pouille	6	6
(Spain) F Verdasco	3	3
Q	(Russia) M Youzhny	6	2	2
(Spain) N Almagro	3	6	6
(United States) S Johnson	6	6
(Slovakia) M Kližan	4	3

Second round
6	(France) G Monfils	7^{7}	6
(South Africa) K Anderson	6^{4}	3
(France) B Paire	1	6^{0}
11	(Belgium) D Goffin	6	7^{7}
13	(France) L Pouille	6	7^{12}
(Spain) N Almagro	4	6^{10}
(United States) S Johnson	3	2
2	(United Kingdom) A Murray	6	6

Third round
6	(France) G Monfils	6	4	2
11	(Belgium) D Goffin	4	6	6
13	(France) L Pouille	1	3
2	(United Kingdom) A Murray	6	6

Quarterfinals
11	(Belgium) D Goffin	2	2
2	(United Kingdom) A Murray	6	6

== Qualifying ==
=== Seeds ===
1. (Russia) Mikhail Youzhny (qualified)
2. (United Kingdom) Kyle Edmund (qualified)
3. (Russia) Karen Khachanov (first round)
4. (United States) Taylor Fritz (qualified)
5. (Chinese Taipei) Lu Yen-hsun (qualifying competition)
6. (France) Adrian Mannarino (first round)
7. (Brazil) Thomaz Bellucci (qualifying competition)
8. (Australia) John Millman (qualifying competition)
9. (Argentina) Diego Schwartzman (first round)
10. (Serbia) Dušan Lajović (qualifying competition)
11. (Spain) Íñigo Cervantes (qualifying competition)
12. (Czech Republic) Lukáš Rosol (qualified)
13. (Kazakhstan) Mikhail Kukushkin (first round)
14. (Japan) Yūichi Sugita (qualified)

=== Qualifiers ===
1. (Russia) Mikhail Youzhny
2. (United Kingdom) Kyle Edmund
3. (United States) Taylor Fritz
4. (Japan) Yūichi Sugita
5. (Czech Republic) Lukáš Rosol
6. (Canada) Vasek Pospisil
7. (Germany) Mischa Zverev

=== Qualifying draw ===
==== First qualifier ====
First round
1	(Russia) Mikhail Youzhny	6	6
WC	(China) Ouyang Bowen	3	1
(Germany) Michael Berrer	6	6
13	(Kazakhstan) Mikhail Kukushkin	3	4

Qualifying competition
1	(Russia) Mikhail Youzhny	6	6
(Germany) Michael Berrer	2	2

==== Second qualifier ====
First round
2	(United Kingdom) Kyle Edmund	6	6
WC	(China) He Yecong	3	2
WC	(China) Gao Xin	2	7^{7}	3
10	(Serbia) Dušan Lajović	6	6^{2}	6

Qualifying competition
2	(United Kingdom) Kyle Edmund	6	2	6
10	(Serbia) Dušan Lajović	4	6	3

==== Third qualifier ====
First round
3	(Russia) Karen Khachanov	6	4	4
(Germany) Mischa Zverev	4	6	6
(United States) Ryan Harrison	6	1	6
9	(Argentina) Diego Schwartzman	3	6	1

Qualifying competition
(Germany) Mischa Zverev	6	5	7
(United States) Ryan Harrison	3	7	5

==== Fourth qualifier ====
First round
4	(United States) Taylor Fritz	7^{7}	7^{7}
(Italy) Andreas Seppi	6^{5}	6^{5}
(Italy) Thomas Fabbiano	3	4
8	(Australia) John Millman	6	6

Qualifying competition
4	(United States) Taylor Fritz	6	6
8	(Australia) John Millman	4	2

==== Fifth qualifier ====
First round
5	(Chinese Taipei) Lu Yen-hsun	6	6
WC	(China) Zhang Zhizhen	4	1
(France) Édouard Roger-Vasselin	2	5
14	(Japan) Yūichi Sugita	6	7

Qualifying competition
5	(Chinese Taipei) Lu Yen-hsun	6^{6}	6	3
14	(Japan) Yūichi Sugita	7^{8}	3	6

==== Sixth qualifier ====
First round
6	(France) Adrian Mannarino	6^{0}	7^{7}	3
(Canada) Vasek Pospisil	7^{7}	6^{3}	6
(United States) Jared Donaldson	6	3	2
11	(Spain) Íñigo Cervantes	2	6	6

Qualifying competition
(Canada) Vasek Pospisil	6	4	6
11	(Spain) Íñigo Cervantes	4	6	4

==== Seventh qualifier ====
First round
7	(Brazil) Thomaz Bellucci	6	7
PR	(Australia) Matthew Ebden	4	5
(Georgia (country)) Nikoloz Basilashvili	6^{3}	6	6^{5}
12	(Czech Republic) Lukáš Rosol	7^{7}	4	7^{7}

Qualifying competition
7	(Brazil) Thomaz Bellucci	2	4
12	(Czech Republic) Lukáš Rosol	6	6
