= 2017 Shanghai Rolex Masters – Singles =

Singles
- 2017 Shanghai Rolex Masters

Final
- Champion: (Switzerland) Roger Federer
- Runner-up: (Spain) Rafael Nadal
- Score: 6–4, 6–3

Details
- Draw: 56 (7 Q / 4 WC )
- Seeds: 16

Events
| Singles | Doubles |
| ← 2016 · | Shanghai Masters | · 2018 → |

Roger Federer defeated Rafael Nadal in the final, 6–4, 6–3 to win the singles tennis title at the 2017 Shanghai Masters. It was his second Shanghai Masters title and 27th Masters 1000 singles title overall.

Andy Murray was the defending champion, but did not participate due to a hip injury.

== Seeds ==
The top eight seeds receive a bye into the second round.

1. (Spain) Rafael Nadal (final)
2. (Switzerland) Roger Federer (champion)
3. (Germany) Alexander Zverev (third round)
4. (Croatia) Marin Čilić (semifinals)
5. (Austria) Dominic Thiem (second round)
6. (Bulgaria) Grigor Dimitrov (quarterfinals)
7. (Spain) Pablo Carreño Busta (second round)
8. (Belgium) David Goffin (second round)

9. (Spain) Roberto Bautista Agut (first round)
10. (United States) Sam Querrey (third round)
11. (South Africa) Kevin Anderson (second round)
12. (United States) John Isner (third round)
13. (Australia) Nick Kyrgios (first round, retired)
14. (United States) Jack Sock (first round, retired)
15. (France) Lucas Pouille (second round)
16. (Argentina) Juan Martín del Potro (semifinals)

Click on the seed number of a player to go to their draw section.

== Draw ==
=== Key ===
- Q = Qualifier
- WC = Wild card
- LL = Lucky loser
- Alt = Alternate
- SE = Special exempt
- PR = Protected ranking
- ITF = ITF entry
- JE = Junior exempt
- w/o = Walkover
- r = Retired
- d = Defaulted
- SR = Special ranking

=== Finals ===
Quarterfinals
1 | (Spain) Rafael Nadal | 6 | 6^{4} | 6
6 | (Bulgaria) Grigor Dimitrov | 4 | 7^{7} | 3
4 | (Croatia) Marin Čilić | 6 | 6
(Spain) Albert Ramos Viñolas | 3 | 4
(Serbia) Viktor Troicki | 6 | 1 | 4
16 | (Argentina) Juan Martín del Potro | 4 | 6 | 6
(France) Richard Gasquet | 5 | 4
2 | (Switzerland) Roger Federer | 7 | 6

Semifinals
1 | (Spain) Rafael Nadal | 7 | 7^{7}
4 | (Croatia) Marin Čilić | 5 | 6^{3}
16 | (Argentina) Juan Martín del Potro | 6 | 3 | 3
2 | (Switzerland) Roger Federer | 3 | 6 | 6

Final
1 | (Spain) Rafael Nadal | 4 | 3
2 | (Switzerland) Roger Federer | 6 | 6

=== Top half ===
==== Section 1 ====
First round
(United States) J Donaldson | 6^{7} | 6 | 6
(Uruguay) P Cuevas | 7^{9} | 4 | 4
(Spain) F Verdasco | 6 | 4 | 2
(Italy) F Fognini | 2 | 6 | 6
(Russia) D Medvedev | 4 | 2
15 | (France) L Pouille | 6 | 6
10 | (United States) S Querrey | 6 | 6
(Japan) Y Sugita | 3 | 2
(France) B Paire | 4 | 4
Q | (United States) F Tiafoe | 6 | 6
WC | (China) Ze Zhang | 2 | 3
(United States) R Harrison | 6 | 6

Second round
1 | (Spain) R Nadal | 6 | 6
(United States) J Donaldson | 2 | 1
(Italy) F Fognini | 7^{9} | 6
15 | (France) L Pouille | 6^{7} | 3
10 | (United States) S Querrey | 6 | 7^{9}
Q | (United States) F Tiafoe | 3 | 6^{7}
(United States) R Harrison | 6 | 3 | 6^{6}
6 | (Bulgaria) G Dimitrov | 3 | 6 | 7^{8}

Third round
1 | (Spain) R Nadal | 6 | 6
(Italy) F Fognini | 3 | 1
10 | (United States) S Querrey | 3 | 6^{3}
6 | (Bulgaria) G Dimitrov | 6 | 7^{7}

Quarterfinals
1 | (Spain) R Nadal | 6 | 6^{4} | 6
6 | (Bulgaria) G Dimitrov | 4 | 7^{7} | 3

==== Section 2 ====
First round
(United Kingdom) K Edmund | 6 | 6
(Czech Republic) J Veselý | 3 | 2
Q | (France) J Chardy | 6^{2} | 2
WC | (China) D Wu | 7^{7} | 6
(United States) S Johnson | 7^{7} | 0
13 | (Australia) N Kyrgios | 6^{5} | 0^{r}
11 | (South Africa) K Anderson | 6 | 6
(France) A Mannarino | 3 | 1
(Germany) M Zverev | 6 | 5^{r}
(Germany) J-L Struff | 3 | 6
(Spain) A Ramos Viñolas | 3 | 6 | 7
(Portugal) J Sousa | 6 | 3 | 5

Second round
4 | (Croatia) M Čilić | 6 | 7^{7}
(United Kingdom) K Edmund | 3 | 6^{5}
WC | (China) D Wu | 2 | 1
(United States) S Johnson | 6 | 6
11 | (South Africa) K Anderson | 6^{5} | 6^{2}
(Germany) J-L Struff | 7^{7} | 7^{7}
(Spain) A Ramos Viñolas | 7 | 7
7 | (Spain) P Carreño Busta | 5 | 5

Third round
4 | (Croatia) M Čilić | 7^{7} | 6
(United States) S Johnson | 6^{1} | 4
(Germany) J-L Struff | 6^{4} | 4
(Spain) A Ramos Viñolas | 7^{7} | 6

Quarterfinals
4 | (Croatia) M Čilić | 6 | 6
(Spain) A Ramos Viñolas | 3 | 4

=== Bottom half ===
==== Section 3 ====
First round
(Serbia) V Troicki | 6^{3} | 6 | 6
WC | (Canada) D Shapovalov | 7^{7} | 3 | 0
Q | (Greece) S Tsitsipas | 7 | 6
(Russia) K Khachanov | 5 | 3
Q | (Serbia) D Lajović | 6 | 6^{5} | 6^{6}
12 | (United States) J Isner | 4 | 7^{7} | 7^{8}
16 | (Argentina) JM del Potro | 6 | 3 | 6
Q | (Georgia (country)) N Basilashvili | 2 | 6 | 4
(Russia) A Rublev | 6 | 4 | 6
(Bosnia and Herzegovina) D Džumhur | 1 | 6 | 1
(United Kingdom) A Bedene | 6 | 6
(Italy) P Lorenzi | 1 | 4

Second round
5 | (Austria) D Thiem | 3 | 6 | 6^{5}
(Serbia) V Troicki | 6 | 3 | 7^{7}
Q | (Greece) S Tsitsipas | 6^{2} | 6^{9}
12 | (United States) J Isner | 7^{7} | 7^{11}
16 | (Argentina) JM del Potro | 6 | 6
(Russia) A Rublev | 3 | 4
(United Kingdom) A Bedene | 0^{r}
3 | (Germany) A Zverev | 4

Third round
(Serbia) V Troicki | 6 | 7^{7}
12 | (United States) J Isner | 4 | 6^{4}
16 | (Argentina) JM del Potro | 3 | 7^{7} | 6
3 | (Germany) A Zverev | 6 | 6^{5} | 4

Quarterfinals
(Serbia) V Troicki | 6 | 1 | 4
16 | (Argentina) JM del Potro | 4 | 6 | 6

==== Section 4 ====
First round
WC | (China) Y Wu | 3 | 4
(France) G Simon | 6 | 6
(Netherlands) R Haase | 7^{13} | 5 | 2
(France) R Gasquet | 6^{11} | 7 | 6
(South Korea) H Chung | 6 | 6
9 | (Spain) R Bautista Agut | 4 | 3
14 | (United States) J Sock | 6 | 1 | 1^{r}
Q | (Ukraine) A Dolgopolov | 4 | 6 | 2
(Spain) F López | 7^{7} | 7^{8}
(Croatia) I Karlović | 6^{1} | 6^{6}
(Argentina) D Schwartzman | 6 | 7^{7}
Q | (Australia) J Thompson | 4 | 6^{4}

Second round
8 | (Belgium) D Goffin | 6^{4} | 3
(France) G Simon | 7^{7} | 6
(France) R Gasquet | 3 | 6 | 6
(South Korea) H Chung | 6 | 4 | 3
Q | (Ukraine) A Dolgopolov | 7^{7} | 1 | 6
(Spain) F López | 6^{4} | 6 | 4
(Argentina) D Schwartzman | 6^{4} | 4
2 | (Switzerland) R Federer | 7^{7} | 6

Third round
(France) G Simon | 5 | 7^{7} | 3
(France) R Gasquet | 7 | 6^{5} | 6
Q | (Ukraine) A Dolgopolov | 4 | 2
2 | (Switzerland) R Federer | 6 | 6

Quarterfinals
(France) R Gasquet | 5 | 4
2 | (Switzerland) R Federer | 7 | 6

== Qualifying ==
=== Seeds ===
1. (Ukraine) Alexandr Dolgopolov (qualified)
2. (Argentina) Leonardo Mayer (qualifying competition)
3. (Croatia) Borna Ćorić (first round)
4. (United States) Donald Young (qualifying competition)
5. (Georgia (country)) Nikoloz Basilashvili (qualified)
6. (Chinese Taipei) Lu Yen-hsun (qualifying competition)
7. (Germany) Florian Mayer (first round)
8. (Germany) Peter Gojowczyk (first round)
9. (Australia) Jordan Thompson (qualified)
10. (United States) Frances Tiafoe (qualified)
11. (Serbia) Dušan Lajović (qualified)
12. (France) Jérémy Chardy (qualified)
13. (Canada) Vasek Pospisil (qualifying competition)
14. (Tunisia) Malek Jaziri (qualifying competition)

=== Qualifiers ===
1. (Ukraine) Alexandr Dolgopolov
2. (United States) Frances Tiafoe
3. (Australia) Jordan Thompson
4. (Serbia) Dušan Lajović
5. (Georgia (country)) Nikoloz Basilashvili
6. (Greece) Stefanos Tsitsipas
7. (France) Jérémy Chardy

=== Qualifying draw ===
==== First qualifier ====
First round
1 | (Ukraine) Alexandr Dolgopolov | 7^{7} | 6
(Chile) Nicolás Jarry | 6^{1} | 3
(Russia) Mikhail Youzhny | 2 | 4
14 | (Tunisia) Malek Jaziri | 6 | 6

Qualifying competition
1 | (Ukraine) Alexandr Dolgopolov | 7^{7} | 7
14 | (Tunisia) Malek Jaziri | 6^{4} | 5

==== Second qualifier ====
First round
2 | (Argentina) Leonardo Mayer | 7^{7} | 3 | 7^{7}
(Ukraine) Sergiy Stakhovsky | 6^{2} | 6 | 6^{5}
WC | (China) Zhang Zhizhen | 4 | 4
10 | (United States) Frances Tiafoe | 6 | 6

Qualifying competition
2 | (Argentina) Leonardo Mayer | 6 | 4 | 4
10 | (United States) Frances Tiafoe | 4 | 6 | 6

==== Third qualifier ====
First round
3 | (Croatia) Borna Ćorić | 6^{8} | 4
(Switzerland) Henri Laaksonen | 7^{10} | 6
WC | (China) Bai Yan | 3 | 1
9 | (Australia) Jordan Thompson | 6 | 6

Qualifying competition
(Switzerland) Henri Laaksonen | 2 | 3
9 | (Australia) Jordan Thompson | 6 | 6

==== Fourth qualifier ====
First round
4 | (United States) Donald Young | 6 | 6
(Canada) Peter Polansky | 1 | 4
(Japan) Taro Daniel | 1 | 7^{7} | 2
11 | (Serbia) Dušan Lajović | 6 | 6^{5} | 6

Qualifying competition
4 | (United States) Donald Young | 3 | 2
11 | (Serbia) Dušan Lajović | 6 | 6

==== Fifth qualifier ====
First round
5 | (Georgia (country)) Nikoloz Basilashvili | 6 | 7^{7}
WC | (China) Sun Fajing | 3 | 6^{3}
(United States) Taylor Fritz | 3 | 6^{5}
13 | (Canada) Vasek Pospisil | 6 | 7^{7}

Qualifying competition
5 | (Georgia (country)) Nikoloz Basilashvili | 7^{9} | 2 | 6
13 | (Canada) Vasek Pospisil | 6^{7} | 6 | 3

==== Sixth qualifier ====
First round
6 | (Chinese Taipei) Lu Yen-hsun | 7 | 6
WC | (China) Te Rigele | 5 | 3
(Greece) Stefanos Tsitsipas | 6 | 7^{7}
8 | (Germany) Peter Gojowczyk | 3 | 6^{4}

Qualifying competition
6 | (Chinese Taipei) Lu Yen-hsun | 7 | 6^{2} | 4
(Greece) Stefanos Tsitsipas | 5 | 7^{7} | 6

==== Seventh qualifier ====
First round
7 | (Germany) Florian Mayer | 1 | 6^{4}
(Moldova) Radu Albot | 6 | 7^{7}
(Brazil) Thiago Monteiro | 7^{13} | 3 | 4
12 | (France) Jérémy Chardy | 6^{11} | 6 | 6

Qualifying competition
(Moldova) Radu Albot | 1 | 6^{6}
12 | (France) Jérémy Chardy | 6 | 7^{8}
