= 2017 WTA Premier Mandatory and Premier 5 tournaments =

Women's professional tennis tour

2017 Premier Mandatory / Premier 5
Details
- Duration: February 20 – October 6
- Edition: 28th
- Tournaments: 9

Achievements (singles)
- Most titles: (Ukraine) Elina Svitolina (3)
- Most finals: (Romania) Simona Halep (4)

The WTA Premier Mandatory and Premier 5 tournaments, which are part of the WTA Premier tournaments, make up the elite tour for professional women's tennis organised by the WTA called the WTA Tour. There are four Premier Mandatory tournaments: Indian Wells, Miami, Madrid and Beijing and five Premier 5 tournaments: Dubai, Rome, Canada, Cincinnati and Wuhan.

== Tournaments ==
Tournament	Country	Location	Surface	Date	Prize money
Dubai Tennis Championships	United Arab Emirates	Dubai	Hard	Feb 20 – 26	$2,666,000
Indian Wells Open	United States	Indian Wells	Hard	Mar 6 – 19	$7,669,423
Miami Open	United States	Key Biscayne	Hard	Mar 20 – Apr 2	$7,669,423
Madrid Open	Spain	Madrid	Clay (red)	May 8 – 14	€5,924,318
Italian Open	Italy	Rome	Clay (red)	May 15 – 21	$3,076,495
Canadian Open	Canada	Toronto	Hard	Aug 7 – 13	$2,735,139
Cincinnati Open	United States	Mason	Hard	Aug 14 – 20	$2,836,904
Wuhan Open	China	Wuhan	Hard	Sep 25 – Oct 1	$2,666,000
China Open	China	Beijing	Hard	Oct 2 – 8	$6,289,521

== Results ==
* First-time champion

Tournament	Singles champions	Runners-up	Score	Doubles champions	Runners-up	Score
Dubai Singles – Doubles	(Ukraine) Elina Svitolina*	(Denmark) Caroline Wozniacki	6–4, 6–2	(Russia) Ekaterina Makarova (Russia) Elena Vesnina	(Czech Republic) Andrea Hlaváčková (China) Peng Shuai	6–2, 4–6, [10–7]
Indian Wells Singles – Doubles	(Russia) Elena Vesnina*	(Russia) Svetlana Kuznetsova	6–7^{(6–8)}, 7–5, 6–4	(Chinese Taipei) Latisha Chan (Switzerland) Martina Hingis	(Czech Republic) Lucie Hradecká (Czech Republic) Kateřina Siniaková	7–6^{(7–4)}, 6–2
Miami Singles – Doubles	(United Kingdom) Johanna Konta*	(Denmark) Caroline Wozniacki	6–4, 6–3	(Canada) Gabriela Dabrowski* (China) Xu Yifan*	(India) Sania Mirza (Czech Republic) Barbora Strýcová	6–4, 6–3
Madrid Singles – Doubles	(Romania) Simona Halep	(France) Kristina Mladenovic	7–5, 6–7^{(5–7)}, 6–2	(Chinese Taipei) Latisha Chan (2) (Switzerland) Martina Hingis (2)	(Hungary) Tímea Babos (Czech Republic) Andrea Hlaváčková	6–4, 6–3
Rome Singles – Doubles	(Ukraine) Elina Svitolina (2)	(Romania) Simona Halep	4–6, 7–5, 6–1	(Chinese Taipei) Latisha Chan (3) (Switzerland) Martina Hingis (3)	(Russia) Ekaterina Makarova (Russia) Elena Vesnina	7–5, 7–6^{(7–4)}
Toronto Singles – Doubles	(Ukraine) Elina Svitolina (3)	(Denmark) Caroline Wozniacki	6–4, 6–0	(Russia) Ekaterina Makarova (2) (Russia) Elena Vesnina (2)	(Germany) Anna-Lena Grönefeld (Czech Republic) Květa Peschke	6–0, 6–4
Cincinnati Singles – Doubles	(Spain) Garbiñe Muguruza	(Romania) Simona Halep	6–1, 6–0	(Chinese Taipei) Latisha Chan (4) (Switzerland) Martina Hingis (4)	(Chinese Taipei) Hsieh Su-wei (Romania) Monica Niculescu	4–6, 6–4, [10–7]
Wuhan Singles – Doubles	(France) Caroline Garcia*	(Australia) Ashleigh Barty	6–7^{(3–7)}, 7–6^{(7–4)}, 6–2	(Chinese Taipei) Latisha Chan (5) (Switzerland) Martina Hingis (5)	(Japan) Shuko Aoyama (China) Yang Zhaoxuan	7–6^{(7–5)}, 3–6, [10–4]
Beijing Singles – Doubles	(France) Caroline Garcia (2)	(Romania) Simona Halep	6–4, 7–6^{(7–3)}	(Chinese Taipei) Latisha Chan (6) (Switzerland) Martina Hingis (6)	(Hungary) Tímea Babos (Czech Republic) Andrea Hlaváčková	6–1, 6–4

== See also ==
- WTA Premier tournaments
- 2017 WTA Tour
- 2017 ATP Masters 1000
- 2017 ATP Tour
