= 2017 ATP World Tour Masters 1000 =

Men's professional tennis tour

2017 ATP Masters 1000
Details
- Duration: March 9 – November 5
- Edition: 28th
- Tournaments: 9

Achievements (singles)
- Most titles: (Switzerland) Roger Federer (3)
- Most finals: (Switzerland) Roger Federer (Spain) Rafael Nadal (4)

The twenty-eighth edition of the ATP Masters Series. The champion of each Masters event is awarded 1,000 rankings points.

== Tournaments ==
Tournament	Country	Location	Surface	Prize money
Indian Wells Masters	USA	Indian Wells, California	Hard	$7,913,405
Miami Open	USA	Key Biscayne, Florida	Hard	$7,913,405
Monte-Carlo Masters	France	Roquebrune-Cap-Martin	Clay	€4,629,725
Madrid Open	Spain	Madrid	Clay	€6,408,230
Italian Open	Italy	Rome	Clay	€4,835,975
Canadian Open	Canada	Montreal	Hard	$5,275,595
Cincinnati Masters	USA	Mason, Ohio	Hard	$5,627,305
Shanghai Masters	China	Shanghai	Hard	$8,092,625
Paris Masters	France	Paris	Hard (indoor)	€4,835,975

== Results ==
* First-time champion

Masters	Singles champions	Runners-up	Score	Doubles champions	Runners-up	Score
Indian Wells Singles – Doubles	(Switzerland) Roger Federer	(Switzerland) Stan Wawrinka	6–4, 7–5	(South Africa) Raven Klaasen	(Poland) Łukasz Kubot (Brazil) Marcelo Melo	6–7^{(1–7)}, 6–4, [10–8]
Indian Wells Singles – Doubles	(Switzerland) Roger Federer	(Switzerland) Stan Wawrinka	6–4, 7–5	(United States) Rajeev Ram*	(Poland) Łukasz Kubot (Brazil) Marcelo Melo	6–7^{(1–7)}, 6–4, [10–8]
Miami Singles – Doubles	(Switzerland) Roger Federer	(Spain) Rafael Nadal	6–3, 6–4	(Poland) Łukasz Kubot*	(United States) Nicholas Monroe (United States) Jack Sock	7–5, 6–3
Miami Singles – Doubles	(Switzerland) Roger Federer	(Spain) Rafael Nadal	6–3, 6–4	(Brazil) Marcelo Melo	(United States) Nicholas Monroe (United States) Jack Sock	7–5, 6–3
Monte Carlo Singles – Doubles	(Spain) Rafael Nadal	(Spain) Albert Ramos Viñolas	6–1, 6–3	(India) Rohan Bopanna (Uruguay) Pablo Cuevas	(Spain) Feliciano López (Spain) Marc López	6–3, 3–6, [10–4]
Madrid Singles – Doubles	(Spain) Rafael Nadal	(Austria) Dominic Thiem	7–6^{(10–8)}, 6–4	(Poland) Łukasz Kubot (Brazil) Marcelo Melo	(France) Nicolas Mahut (France) Édouard Roger-Vasselin	7–5, 6–3
Rome Singles – Doubles	(Germany) Alexander Zverev*	(Serbia) Novak Djokovic	6–4, 6–3	(France) Pierre-Hugues Herbert (France) Nicolas Mahut	(Croatia) Ivan Dodig (Spain) Marcel Granollers	4–6, 6–4, [10–3]
Montreal Singles – Doubles	(Germany) Alexander Zverev	(Switzerland) Roger Federer	6–3, 6–4	(France) Pierre-Hugues Herbert (France) Nicolas Mahut	(Croatia) Ivan Dodig (India) Rohan Bopanna	6–4, 3–6, [10–6]
Cincinnati Singles – Doubles	(Bulgaria) Grigor Dimitrov*	(Australia) Nick Kyrgios	6–3, 7–5	(France) Pierre-Hugues Herbert (France) Nicolas Mahut	(United Kingdom) Jamie Murray (Brazil) Bruno Soares	7–6^{(8–6)}, 6–4
Shanghai Singles – Doubles	(Switzerland) Roger Federer	(Spain) Rafael Nadal	6–4, 6–3	(Finland) Henri Kontinen (Australia) John Peers	(Poland) Łukasz Kubot (Brazil) Marcelo Melo	6–4, 6–2
Paris Singles – Doubles	(United States) Jack Sock*	(Serbia) Filip Krajinović	5–7, 6–4, 6–1	(Poland) Łukasz Kubot (Brazil) Marcelo Melo	(Croatia) Ivan Dodig (Spain) Marcel Granollers	7–6^{(7–3)}, 3–6, [10–6]

== Tournament details ==
Key

- Q = Qualifier
- WC = Wild card
- LL = Lucky loser
- Alt = Alternate
- ITF = ITF entry
- PR = Protected ranking
- SR = Special ranking
- SE = Special exempt
- JE = Junior exempt
- JR = Junior Accelerator Programme entrant
- CO = College Accelerator Programme entrant
- NG = Next Gen Accelerator Program entrant
- w/o = Walkover
- r = Retired
- d = Defaulted

=== Indian Wells Masters ===
==== Singles ====
Quarterfinals
21	(Spain) Pablo Carreño Busta	6	3	7^{7}
27	(Uruguay) Pablo Cuevas	1	6	6^{4}
3	(Switzerland) Stan Wawrinka	6	4	7^{7}
8	(Austria) Dominic Thiem	4	6	6^{2}
17	(United States) Jack Sock	6	2	6
4	(Japan) Kei Nishikori	3	6	2
9	(Switzerland) Roger Federer	w/o
15	(Australia) Nick Kyrgios

Semifinals
21	(Spain) Pablo Carreño Busta	3	2
3	(Switzerland) Stan Wawrinka	6	6
17	(United States) Jack Sock	1	6^{4}
9	(Switzerland) Roger Federer	6	7^{7}

Final
3	(Switzerland) Stan Wawrinka	4	5
9	(Switzerland) Roger Federer	6	7

==== Doubles ====
Semifinals
6	(South Africa) Raven Klaasen (United States) Rajeev Ram	6	6
(Luxembourg) Gilles Müller (United States) Sam Querrey	2	4
4	(United Kingdom) Jamie Murray (Brazil) Bruno Soares	6	5	[5]
8	(Poland) Łukasz Kubot (Brazil) Marcelo Melo	3	7	[10]

Final
6	(South Africa) Raven Klaasen (United States) Rajeev Ram	6^{1}	6	[10]
8	(Poland) Łukasz Kubot (Brazil) Marcelo Melo	7^{7}	4	[8]

=== Miami Open ===
==== Singles ====
Quarterfinals
16	(Germany) Alexander Zverev	4	7^{11}	3
12	(Australia) Nick Kyrgios	6	6^{9}	6
4	(Switzerland) Roger Federer	6	3	7^{8}
10	(Czech Republic) Tomas Berdych	2	6	6^{6}
5	(Spain) Rafael Nadal	6	6
13	(United States) Jack Sock	2	3
(Italy) Fabio Fognini	6	6
2	(Japan) Kei Nishikori	4	2

Semifinals
12	(Australia) Nick Kyrgios	6^{9}	7^{11}	6^{5}
4	(Switzerland) Roger Federer	7^{11}	6^{9}	7^{7}
5	(Spain) Rafael Nadal	6	7
(Italy) Fabio Fognini	1	5

Final
4	(Switzerland) Roger Federer	6	6
5	(Spain) Rafael Nadal	3	4

==== Doubles ====
Semifinals
(United States) Nicholas Monroe (United States) Jack Sock	7^{7}	6
3	(United States) Bob Bryan (United States) Mike Bryan	6^{5}	3
6	(Poland) Łukasz Kubot (Brazil) Marcelo Melo	6	6
(United States) Brian Baker (Canada) Daniel Nestor	4	3

Final
(United States) Nicholas Monroe (United States) Jack Sock	5	3
6	(Poland) Łukasz Kubot (Brazil) Marcelo Melo	7	6

=== Monte-Carlo Masters ===
==== Singles ====
Quarterfinals
15	(Spain) Albert Ramos Viñolas	6	6^{5}	6
5	(Croatia) Marin Čilić	2	7^{7}	2
16	(Uruguay) Pablo Cuevas	0	6	5
11	(France) Lucas Pouille	6	3	7
(Argentina) Diego Schwartzman	4	4
4	(Spain) Rafael Nadal	6	6
10	(Belgium) David Goffin	6	3	7
2	(Serbia) Novak Djokovic	2	6	5

Semifinals
15	(Spain) Albert Ramos Viñolas	6	5	6
11	(France) Lucas Pouille	3	7	1
4	(Spain) Rafael Nadal	6	6
10	(Belgium) David Goffin	3	1

Final
15	(Spain) Albert Ramos Viñolas	1	3
4	(Spain) Rafael Nadal	6	6

==== Doubles ====
Semifinals
(India) Rohan Bopanna (Uruguay) Pablo Cuevas	6	6
WC	(Monaco) Romain Arneodo (France) Hugo Nys	4	3
7	(Spain) Feliciano López (Spain) Marc López	6	7^{7}
2	(France) Pierre-Hugues Herbert (France) Nicolas Mahut	1	6^{4}

Final
(India) Rohan Bopanna (Uruguay) Pablo Cuevas	6	3	[10]
7	(Spain) Feliciano López (Spain) Marc López	3	6	[4]

=== Madrid Open ===
==== Singles ====
Quarterfinals
LL	(Croatia) Borna Ćorić	1	4
8	(Austria) Dominic Thiem	6	6
(Uruguay) Pablo Cuevas	3	6	6
(Germany) Alexander Zverev	6	0	4
9	(Belgium) David Goffin	6^{3}	2
4	(Spain) Rafael Nadal	7^{7}	6
6	(Japan) Kei Nishikori
2	(Serbia) Novak Djokovic	w/o

Semifinals
8	(Austria) Dominic Thiem	6	6
(Uruguay) Pablo Cuevas	4	4
4	(Spain) Rafael Nadal	6	6
2	(Serbia) Novak Djokovic	2	4

Final
8	(Austria) Dominic Thiem	6^{8}	4
4	(Spain) Rafael Nadal	7^{10}	6

==== Doubles ====
Semifinals
8	(Spain) Feliciano López (Spain) Marc López	2	3
6	(France) Nicolas Mahut (France) Édouard Roger-Vasselin	6	6
4	(Poland) Łukasz Kubot (Brazil) Marcelo Melo	w/o
(Australia) Nick Kyrgios (United States) Jack Sock

Final
6	(France) Nicolas Mahut (France) Édouard Roger-Vasselin	5	3
4	(Poland) Łukasz Kubot (Brazil) Marcelo Melo	7	6

=== Italian Open ===
==== Singles ====
Quarterfinals
16	(Germany) Alexander Zverev	7^{7}	6
5	(Canada) Milos Raonic	6^{4}	1
(United States) John Isner	7^{7}	2	7^{7}
6	(Croatia) Marin Čilić	6^{3}	6	6^{2}
8	(Austria) Dominic Thiem	6	6
4	(Spain) Rafael Nadal	4	3
(Argentina) Juan Martín del Potro	1	4
2	(Serbia) Novak Djokovic	6	6

Semifinals
16	(Germany) Alexander Zverev	6	6^{5}	6
(United States) John Isner	4	7^{7}	1
8	(Austria) Dominic Thiem	1	0
2	(Serbia) Novak Djokovic	6	6

Final
16	(Germany) Alexander Zverev	6	6
2	(Serbia) Novak Djokovic	4	3

==== Doubles ====
Semifinals
1	(Finland) Henri Kontinen (Australia) John Peers	3	3
8	(Croatia) Ivan Dodig (Spain) Marcel Granollers	6	6
4	(France) Pierre-Hugues Herbert (France) Nicolas Mahut	7^{7}	4	[10]
2	(United States) Bob Bryan (United States) Mike Bryan	6^{5}	6	[7]

Final
8	(Croatia) Ivan Dodig (Spain) Marcel Granollers	6	4	[3]
4	(France) Pierre-Hugues Herbert (France) Nicolas Mahut	4	6	[10]

=== Canadian Open ===
==== Singles ====
Quarterfinals
WC	(Canada) Denis Shapovalov	2	6	6
(France) Adrian Mannarino	6	3	4
4	(Germany) Alexander Zverev	7	6
(South Africa) Kevin Anderson	5	4
(Netherlands) Robin Haase	4	6	6
(Argentina) Diego Schwartzman	6	3	3
12	(Spain) Roberto Bautista Agut	4	4
2	(Switzerland) Roger Federer	6	6

Semifinals
WC	(Canada) Denis Shapovalov	4	5
4	(Germany) Alexander Zverev	6	7
(Netherlands) Robin Haase	3	6^{5}
2	(Switzerland) Roger Federer	6	7^{7}

Final
4	(Germany) Alexander Zverev	6	6
2	(Switzerland) Roger Federer	3	4

==== Doubles ====
Semifinals
8	(Austria) Oliver Marach (Croatia) Mate Pavić	5	3
5	(France) Pierre-Hugues Herbert (France) Nicolas Mahut	7	6
7	(India) Rohan Bopanna (Croatia) Ivan Dodig	4	7^{10}	[11]
6	(South Africa) Raven Klaasen (United States) Rajeev Ram	6	6^{8}	[9]

Final
5	(France) Pierre-Hugues Herbert (France) Nicolas Mahut	6	3	[10]
7	(India) Rohan Bopanna (Croatia) Ivan Dodig	4	6	[6]

=== Cincinnati Masters ===
==== Singles ====
Quarterfinals
1	(Spain) Rafael Nadal	2	5
(Australia) Nick Kyrgios	6	7
3	(Austria) Dominic Thiem	3	3
(Spain) David Ferrer	6	6
WC	(United States) Jared Donaldson	6^{4}	5
14	(United States) John Isner	7^{7}	7
7	(Bulgaria) Grigor Dimitrov	6	6
(Japan) Yūichi Sugita	2	1

Semifinals
(Australia) Nick Kyrgios	7^{7}	7^{7}
(Spain) David Ferrer	6^{3}	6^{4}
14	(United States) John Isner	6^{4}	6^{10}
7	(Bulgaria) Grigor Dimitrov	7^{7}	7^{12}

Final
(Australia) Nick Kyrgios	3	5
7	(Bulgaria) Grigor Dimitrov	6	7

==== Doubles ====
Semifinals
(United States) Ryan Harrison (New Zealand) Michael Venus	4	6^{9}
5	(France) Pierre-Hugues Herbert (France) Nicolas Mahut	6	7^{11}
3	(United Kingdom) Jamie Murray (Brazil) Bruno Soares	6	7
2	(Poland) Łukasz Kubot (Brazil) Marcelo Melo	4	5

Final
5	(France) Pierre-Hugues Herbert (France) Nicolas Mahut	7^{8}	6
3	(United Kingdom) Jamie Murray (Brazil) Bruno Soares	6^{6}	4

=== Shanghai Masters ===
==== Singles ====
Quarterfinals
1	(Spain) Rafael Nadal	6	6^{4}	6
6	(Bulgaria) Grigor Dimitrov	4	7^{7}	3
4	(Croatia) Marin Čilić	6	6
(Spain) Albert Ramos Viñolas	3	4
(Serbia) Viktor Troicki	6	1	4
16	(Argentina) Juan Martín del Potro	4	6	6
(France) Richard Gasquet	5	4
2	(Switzerland) Roger Federer	7	6

Semifinals
1	(Spain) Rafael Nadal	7	7^{7}
4	(Croatia) Marin Čilić	5	6^{3}
16	(Argentina) Juan Martín del Potro	6	3	3
2	(Switzerland) Roger Federer	3	6	6

Final
1	(Spain) Rafael Nadal	4	3
2	(Switzerland) Roger Federer	6	6

==== Doubles ====
Semifinals
1	(Finland) Henri Kontinen (Australia) John Peers	7^{7}	3	[10]
4	(United Kingdom) Jamie Murray (Brazil) Bruno Soares	6^{3}	6	[4]
3	(Netherlands) Jean-Julien Rojer (Romania) Horia Tecău	6	3	[7]
2	(Poland) Łukasz Kubot (Brazil) Marcelo Melo	4	6	[10]

Final
1	(Finland) Henri Kontinen (Australia) John Peers	6	6
2	(Poland) Łukasz Kubot (Brazil) Marcelo Melo	4	2

=== Paris Masters ===
==== Singles ====
Quarterfinals
1	(Spain) Rafael Nadal
Q	(Serbia) Filip Krajinović	w/o
13	(Argentina) Juan Martín del Potro	4	7^{7}	4
9	(United States) John Isner	6	6^{5}	6
WC	(France) Julien Benneteau	7^{7}	7
3	(Croatia) Marin Čilić	6^{5}	5
(Spain) Fernando Verdasco	7^{7}	2	3
16	(United States) Jack Sock	6^{3}	6	6

Semifinals
Q	(Serbia) Filip Krajinović	6	6^{2}	7^{7}
9	(United States) John Isner	4	7^{7}	6^{5}
WC	(France) Julien Benneteau	5	2
16	(United States) Jack Sock	7	6

Final
Q	(Serbia) Filip Krajinović	7	4	1
16	(United States) Jack Sock	5	6	6

==== Doubles ====
Semifinals
7	(Croatia) Ivan Dodig (Spain) Marcel Granollers	3	7^{7}	[11]
6	(Netherlands) Jean-Julien Rojer (Romania) Horia Tecău	6	6^{5}	[9]
5	(United Kingdom) Jamie Murray (Brazil) Bruno Soares	4	2
2	(Poland) Łukasz Kubot (Brazil) Marcelo Melo	6	6

Final
7	(Croatia) Ivan Dodig (Spain) Marcel Granollers	6^{3}	6	[6]
2	(Poland) Łukasz Kubot (Brazil) Marcelo Melo	7^{7}	3	[10]

== See also ==
- ATP Tour Masters 1000
- 2017 ATP Tour
- 2017 WTA Premier Mandatory and Premier 5 tournaments
- 2017 WTA Tour
