= 2017 Dubai Tennis Championships – Men's doubles =

Men's doubles
- 2017 Dubai Tennis Championships

Final
- Champions: (Netherlands) Jean-Julien Rojer (Romania) Horia Tecău
- Runners-up: (India) Rohan Bopanna (Poland) Marcin Matkowski
- Score: 4–6, 6–3, [10–3]

Details
- Draw: 16
- Seeds: 4

Events
Singles	men	women
Doubles	men	women
- Dubai Tennis Championships

Simone Bolelli and Andreas Seppi were the defending champions, but Bolelli chose to compete in São Paulo instead. Seppi played alongside Jeevan Nedunchezhiyan in the qualifying tournament, but lost in the qualifying competition to James Cerretani and Philipp Oswald.

Jean-Julien Rojer and Horia Tecău won the title, defeating Rohan Bopanna and Marcin Matkowski in the final, 4–6, 6–3, [10–3].

== Seeds ==
1. (Finland) Henri Kontinen / (Australia) John Peers (semifinals)
2. (Croatia) Ivan Dodig / (Spain) Marcel Granollers (first round)
3. (Canada) Daniel Nestor / (France) Édouard Roger-Vasselin (quarterfinals)
4. (Netherlands) Jean-Julien Rojer / (Romania) Horia Tecău (champions)

== Draw ==
Key

- Q = Qualifier
- WC = Wild card
- LL = Lucky loser
- Alt = Alternate
- ITF = ITF entry
- PR = Protected ranking
- SR = Special ranking
- SE = Special exempt
- JE = Junior exempt
- JR = Junior Accelerator Programme entrant
- CO = College Accelerator Programme entrant
- NG = Next Gen Accelerator Program entrant
- w/o = Walkover
- r = Retired
- d = Defaulted

=== Draw ===
First round
1	(Finland) H Kontinen (Australia) J Peers	6	6
WC	(United Arab Emirates) O Alawadhi (Iran) A Madanchi	1	1
(United Kingdom) D Evans (Luxembourg) G Müller	6	7^{7}
(United Kingdom) A Murray (Serbia) N Zimonjić	1	6^{2}
4	(Netherlands) J-J Rojer (Romania) H Tecău	7^{7}	6
(Croatia) M Pavić (Austria) A Peya	6^{2}	1
(France) L Pouille (Spain) F Verdasco
(Germany) P Kohlschreiber (Germany) F Mayer	w/o
Q	(United States) J Cerretani (Austria) P Oswald	2	4
(Spain) G García López (India) L Paes	6	6
WC	(Republic of Ireland) J McGee (Republic of Ireland) D O'Hare	1	1
3	(Canada) D Nestor (France) É Roger-Vasselin	6	6
(Russia) K Khachanov (France) B Paire	7^{7}	4	[6]
(Romania) F Mergea (Serbia) V Troicki	6^{5}	6	[10]
(India) R Bopanna (Poland) M Matkowski	5	6	[11]
2	(Croatia) I Dodig (Spain) M Granollers	7	3	[9]

Quarterfinals
1	(Finland) H Kontinen (Australia) J Peers	7^{7}	6
(United Kingdom) D Evans (Luxembourg) G Müller	6^{1}	4
4	(Netherlands) J-J Rojer (Romania) H Tecău	w/o
(Germany) P Kohlschreiber (Germany) F Mayer
(Spain) G García López (India) L Paes	7^{7}	7^{8}
3	(Canada) D Nestor (France) É Roger-Vasselin	6^{3}	6^{6}
(Romania) F Mergea (Serbia) V Troicki	3	4
(India) R Bopanna (Poland) M Matkowski	6	6

Semifinals
1	(Finland) H Kontinen (Australia) J Peers	6^{8}	3
4	(Netherlands) J-J Rojer (Romania) H Tecău	7^{10}	6
(Spain) G García López (India) L Paes	3	6	[6]
(India) R Bopanna (Poland) M Matkowski	6	3	[10]

Final
4	(Netherlands) J-J Rojer (Romania) H Tecău	4	6	[10]
(India) R Bopanna (Poland) M Matkowski	6	3	[3]

== Qualifying ==
=== Seeds ===
1. (Netherlands) Wesley Koolhof / (Netherlands) Matwé Middelkoop (first round)
2. (United States) James Cerretani / (Austria) Philipp Oswald (qualified)

=== Qualifiers ===
1. (United States) James Cerretani / (Austria) Philipp Oswald

=== Qualifying draw ===
First round
1	(Netherlands) Wesley Koolhof (Netherlands) Matwé Middelkoop	1	6	[10]
WC	(India) Jeevan Nedunchezhiyan (Italy) Andreas Seppi	6	4	[12]
(Germany) Jan-Lennard Struff (Czech Republic) Jiří Veselý	3	3
2	(United States) James Cerretani (Austria) Philipp Oswald	6	6

Qualifying competition
WC	(India) Jeevan Nedunchezhiyan (Italy) Andreas Seppi	5	3
2	(United States) James Cerretani (Austria) Philipp Oswald	7	6
