= 2017 Dubai Tennis Championships – Men's singles =

Men's singles
- 2017 Dubai Tennis Championships

Final
- Champion: (United Kingdom) Andy Murray
- Runner-up: (Spain) Fernando Verdasco
- Score: 6–3, 6–2

Details
- Draw: 32 (4 Q / 3 WC )
- Seeds: 8

Events
Singles	men	women
Doubles	men	women
- Dubai Tennis Championships

Andy Murray defeated Fernando Verdasco in the final, 6–3, 6–2 to win the men's singles tennis title at the 2017 Dubai Tennis Championships. Murray saved seven match points en route to the title, against Philipp Kohlschreiber in the quarterfinals. He won the second set tiebreak of that match with a score of 20–18, equaling the record of the longest tiebreak in history, until the record was broken in 2022.

Stan Wawrinka was the defending champion, but lost in the first round to Damir Džumhur.

== Seeds ==
1. (United Kingdom) Andy Murray (champion)
2. (Switzerland) Stan Wawrinka (first round)
3. (Switzerland) Roger Federer (second round)
4. (France) Gaël Monfils (quarterfinals)
5. (Czech Republic) Tomáš Berdych (second round)
6. (Spain) Roberto Bautista Agut (second round)
7. (France) Lucas Pouille (semifinals)
8. (Luxembourg) Gilles Müller (first round)

== Draw ==
Key

- Q = Qualifier
- WC = Wild card
- LL = Lucky loser
- Alt = Alternate
- ITF = ITF entry
- PR = Protected ranking
- SR = Special ranking
- SE = Special exempt
- JE = Junior exempt
- JR = Junior Accelerator Programme entrant
- CO = College Accelerator Programme entrant
- NG = Next Gen Accelerator Program entrant
- w/o = Walkover
- r = Retired
- d = Defaulted

=== Finals ===
Semifinals
1	(United Kingdom) Andy Murray	7	6
7	(France) Lucas Pouille	5	1
(Spain) Fernando Verdasco	7^{7}	5	6
(Netherlands) Robin Haase	6^{5}	7	1

Final
1	(United Kingdom) Andy Murray	6	6
(Spain) Fernando Verdasco	3	2

=== Top half ===
First round
1	(United Kingdom) A Murray	6	6
(Tunisia) M Jaziri	4	1
(Serbia) V Troicki	4	3
(Spain) G García López	6	6
WC	(United Arab Emirates) O Alawadhi	2	5
(Russia) D Medvedev	6	7
(Germany) P Kohlschreiber	6	7^{7}
8	(Luxembourg) G Müller	4	6^{1}
3	(Switzerland) R Federer	6	6
(France) B Paire	1	3
(Russia) M Youzhny	4	4
Q	(Russia) E Donskoy	6	6
Q	(Romania) M Copil	6	6
(Germany) J-L Struff	4	2
(Czech Republic) A Pavlásek	2	2
7	(France) L Pouille	6	6

Second round
1	(United Kingdom) A Murray	6	6
(Spain) G García López	2	0
(Russia) D Medvedev	4	4
(Germany) P Kohlschreiber	6	6
3	(Switzerland) R Federer	6	6^{7}	6^{5}
Q	(Russia) E Donskoy	3	7^{9}	7^{7}
Q	(Romania) M Copil	1	4
7	(France) L Pouille	6	6

Quarterfinals
1	(United Kingdom) A Murray	6^{4}	7^{20}	6
(Germany) P Kohlschreiber	7^{7}	6^{18}	1
Q	(Russia) E Donskoy	4	7	6^{2}
7	(France) L Pouille	6	5	7^{7}

Semifinals
1	(United Kingdom) A Murray	7	6
7	(France) L Pouille	5	1

=== Bottom half ===
First round
6/WC	(Spain) R Bautista Agut	6	7^{7}
(Russia) K Khachanov	1	6^{4}
LL	(Italy) A Seppi	2	5
(Spain) F Verdasco	6	7
(United Kingdom) D Evans	6	6
(Germany) D Brown	2	3
WC	(Egypt) M Safwat	4	3
4	(France) G Monfils	6	6
5	(Czech Republic) T Berdych	6	2
Q	(Czech Republic) L Rosol	3	1^{r}
(Netherlands) R Haase	6	6
Q	(Uzbekistan) D Istomin	2	4
(Spain) M Granollers	6	6
(Czech Republic) J Veselý	3	2
(Bosnia and Herzegovina) D Džumhur	7^{7}	6
2	(Switzerland) S Wawrinka	6^{4}	3

Second round
6/WC	(Spain) R Bautista Agut	4	6	5
(Spain) F Verdasco	6	3	7
(United Kingdom) D Evans	4	6	1
4	(France) G Monfils	6	3	6
5	(Czech Republic) T Berdych	6	3	4
(Netherlands) R Haase	3	6	6
(Spain) M Granollers	3	4
(Bosnia and Herzegovina) D Džumhur	6	6

Quarterfinals
(Spain) F Verdasco	6	7
4	(France) G Monfils	3	5
(Netherlands) R Haase	6	4	6
(Bosnia and Herzegovina) D Džumhur	2	6	4

Semifinals
(Spain) F Verdasco	7^{7}	5	6
(Netherlands) R Haase	6^{5}	7	1

== Qualifying ==
=== Seeds ===
1. (Uzbekistan) Denis Istomin (qualified)
2. (Italy) Andreas Seppi (Qualifying competition, lucky loser)
3. (Ukraine) Sergiy Stakhovsky (first round)
4. (Russia) Andrey Rublev (first round)
5. (Russia) Evgeny Donskoy (qualified)
6. (Romania) Marius Copil (qualified)
7. (Italy) Thomas Fabbiano (first round)
8. (Czech Republic) Lukáš Rosol (qualified)

=== Qualifiers ===
1. (Uzbekistan) Denis Istomin
2. (Romania) Marius Copil
3. (Russia) Evgeny Donskoy
4. (Czech Republic) Lukáš Rosol

=== Lucky loser ===
1. (Italy) Andreas Seppi

=== Qualifying draw ===
==== First qualifier ====
First round
1	(Uzbekistan) Denis Istomin	6	6
WC	(Australia) Alexei Popyrin	4	0
(Hungary) Márton Fucsovics	7^{7}	6
7	(Italy) Thomas Fabbiano	6^{5}	4

Qualifying competition
1	(Uzbekistan) Denis Istomin	6	7^{7}
(Hungary) Márton Fucsovics	1	6^{5}

==== Second qualifier ====
First round
2	(Italy) Andreas Seppi	7	7
(Czech Republic) Jan Šátral	5	5
WC	(India) Prajnesh Gunneswaran	2	2
6	(Romania) Marius Copil	6	6

Qualifying competition
2	(Italy) Andreas Seppi	5	6^{2}
6	(Romania) Marius Copil	7	7^{7}

==== Third qualifier ====
First round
3	(Ukraine) Sergiy Stakhovsky	4	6	1
WC	(Republic of Ireland) James McGee	6	1	6
(Germany) Peter Gojowczyk	4	4
5	(Russia) Evgeny Donskoy	6	6

Qualifying competition
WC	(Republic of Ireland) James McGee	1	3
5	(Russia) Evgeny Donskoy	6	6

==== Fourth qualifier ====
First round
4	(Russia) Andrey Rublev	2	7^{10}	2
(France) Vincent Millot	6	6^{8}	6
(Croatia) Ivan Dodig	7	6^{5}	4
8	(Czech Republic) Lukáš Rosol	5	7^{7}	6

Qualifying competition
(France) Vincent Millot	5	1
8	(Czech Republic) Lukáš Rosol	7	6
