= 2017 Monte-Carlo Rolex Masters – Doubles =

Doubles
- 2017 Monte-Carlo Rolex Masters

Final
- Champions: (India) Rohan Bopanna (Uruguay) Pablo Cuevas
- Runners-up: (Spain) Feliciano López (Spain) Marc López
- Score: 6–3, 3–6, [10–4]

Events
Singles	Doubles
← 2016 ·	Monte-Carlo Rolex Masters	· 2018 →

Pierre-Hugues Herbert and Nicolas Mahut were the defending champions, but lost in the semifinals to Feliciano López and Marc López.

Rohan Bopanna and Pablo Cuevas won the title, defeating López and López in the final, 6–3, 3–6, [10–4].

== Seeds ==
All seeds received a bye into the second round.

1. (Finland) Henri Kontinen / (Australia) John Peers (quarterfinals)
2. (France) Pierre-Hugues Herbert / (France) Nicolas Mahut (semifinals)
3. (United Kingdom) Jamie Murray / (Brazil) Bruno Soares (quarterfinals)
4. (Poland) Łukasz Kubot / (Brazil) Marcelo Melo (quarterfinals)
5. (South Africa) Raven Klaasen / (United States) Rajeev Ram (second round)
6. (Croatia) Ivan Dodig / (Spain) Marcel Granollers (quarterfinals)
7. (Spain) Feliciano López / (Spain) Marc López (final)
8. (Netherlands) Jean-Julien Rojer / (Romania) Horia Tecău (second round)

== Draw ==
=== Key ===
- Q = Qualifier
- WC = Wild card
- LL = Lucky loser
- Alt = Alternate
- ITF = ITF entry
- PR = Protected ranking
- SR = Special ranking
- SE = Special exempt
- JE = Junior exempt
- JR = Junior Accelerator Programme entrant
- CO = College Accelerator Programme entrant
- NG = Next Gen Accelerator Program entrant
- w/o = Walkover
- r = Retired
- d = Defaulted

=== Finals ===
Semifinals
(India) Rohan Bopanna (Uruguay) Pablo Cuevas	6	6
WC	(Monaco) Romain Arneodo (France) Hugo Nys	4	3
7	(Spain) Feliciano López (Spain) Marc López	6	7^{7}
2	(France) Pierre-Hugues Herbert (France) Nicolas Mahut	1	6^{4}

Final
(India) Rohan Bopanna (Uruguay) Pablo Cuevas	6	3	[10]
7	(Spain) Feliciano López (Spain) Marc López	3	6	[4]

=== Top half ===
First round
(Serbia) N Djokovic (Serbia) V Troicki	7	6
(Luxembourg) G Müller (France) G Simon	5	3
(Poland) M Matkowski (Austria) A Peya	3	7^{9}	[2]
(India) R Bopanna (Uruguay) P Cuevas	6	6^{7}	[10]
(France) J Benneteau (France) L Pouille	6	4	[8]
PR	(Germany) T Haas (Philippines) T Huey	4	6	[10]
(Spain) P Carreño Busta (Spain) G García López	4	3
WC	(Monaco) R Arneodo (France) H Nys	6	6

Second round
1	(Finland) H Kontinen (Australia) J Peers	6	6
(Serbia) N Djokovic (Serbia) V Troicki	3	4
(India) R Bopanna (Uruguay) P Cuevas	6^{6}	6	[10]
5	(South Africa) R Klaasen (United States) R Ram	7^{8}	4	[6]
3	(United Kingdom) J Murray (Brazil) B Soares	6	6
PR	(Germany) T Haas (Philippines) T Huey	3	2
WC	(Monaco) R Arneodo (France) H Nys	7	7^{7}
8	(Netherlands) J-J Rojer (Romania) H Tecău	5	6^{2}

Quarterfinals
1	(Finland) H Kontinen (Australia) J Peers	6	3	[11]
(India) R Bopanna (Uruguay) P Cuevas	3	6	[13]
3	(United Kingdom) J Murray (Brazil) B Soares	2	7^{7}	[3]
WC	(Monaco) R Arneodo (France) H Nys	6	6^{3}	[10]

Semifinals
(India) R Bopanna (Uruguay) P Cuevas	6	6
WC	(Monaco) R Arneodo (France) H Nys	4	3

=== Bottom half ===
First round
PR	(Croatia) M Čilić (Germany) P Petzschner	4	4
(Romania) F Mergea (Pakistan) A-u-H Qureshi	6	6
(Germany) A Zverev (Germany) M Zverev	6	6
Alt	(Italy) P Lorenzi (Spain) A Ramos Viñolas	4	2
WC	(Bulgaria) G Dimitrov (Serbia) N Zimonjić	4	6	[3]
(France) B Paire (France) É Roger-Vasselin	6	1	[10]
(Belarus) M Mirnyi (Canada) D Nestor	4	6^{2}
(Italy) F Fognini (Switzerland) S Wawrinka	6	7^{7}

Second round
7	(Spain) F López (Spain) M López	6	6
(Romania) F Mergea (Pakistan) A-u-H Qureshi	4	2
(Germany) A Zverev (Germany) M Zverev	1	7^{7}	[12]
4	(Poland) Ł Kubot (Brazil) M Melo	6	6^{4}	[14]
6	(Croatia) I Dodig (Spain) M Granollers	6	6
(France) B Paire (France) É Roger-Vasselin	3	2
(Italy) F Fognini (Switzerland) S Wawrinka	5	2
2	(France) P-H Herbert (France) N Mahut	7	6

Quarterfinals
7	(Spain) F López (Spain) M López	6	6
4	(Poland) Ł Kubot (Brazil) M Melo	4	2
6	(Croatia) I Dodig (Spain) M Granollers	6	4	[6]
2	(France) P-H Herbert (France) N Mahut	3	6	[10]

Semifinals
7	(Spain) F López (Spain) M López	6	7^{7}
2	(France) P-H Herbert (France) N Mahut	1	6^{4}
