= 2017 Monte-Carlo Rolex Masters =

- Date: 16–23 April
- Edition: 111th
- Category: Masters 1000
- Draw: 56S / 24D
- Prize money: €4,273,775
- Surface: Clay / outdoor
- Location: Roquebrune-Cap-Martin, France (billed as Monte Carlo, Monaco)
- Venue: Monte Carlo Country Club

Champions

Singles
- (Spain) Rafael Nadal

Doubles
- (India) Rohan Bopanna / (Uruguay) Pablo Cuevas
| ← 2016 · | Monte-Carlo Masters | · 2018 → |

The 2017 Monte-Carlo Masters was a tennis tournament for male professional players, played from 16 April through 23 April 2017, on outdoor clay courts. It was the 111th edition of the annual Monte Carlo Masters tournament, sponsored by Rolex for the ninth time. It took place at the Monte Carlo Country Club in Roquebrune-Cap-Martin, France (though billed as Monte Carlo, Monaco).

== Points ==
Because the Monte Carlo Masters is the non-mandatory Masters 1000 event, special rules regarding points distribution are in place. The Monte Carlo Masters counts as one of a player's 500 level tournaments, while distributing Masters 1000 points.

| Event | W | F | SF | QF | Round of 16 | Round of 32 | Round of 64 | Q | Q2 | Q1 |
| Singles | 1,000 | 600 | 360 | 180 | 90 | 45 | 10 | 25 | 16 | 0 |
| Doubles | 1,000 | 600 | 360 | 180 | 90 | 0 | — | — | — | — |

== Singles main-draw entrants ==
=== Seeds ===
| Country | Player | Rank | Seed |
|---|---|---|---|
| GBR | Andy Murray | 1 | 1 |
| SRB | Novak Djokovic | 2 | 2 |
| SUI | Stan Wawrinka | 3 | 3 |
| ESP | Rafael Nadal | 5 | 4 |
| CRO | Marin Čilić | 8 | 5 |
| AUT | Dominic Thiem | 9 | 6 |
| FRA | Jo-Wilfried Tsonga | 10 | 7 |
| BUL | Grigor Dimitrov | 12 | 8 |
| CZE | Tomáš Berdych | 13 | 9 |
| BEL | David Goffin | 14 | 10 |
| FRA | Lucas Pouille | 17 | 11 |
| ESP | Roberto Bautista Agut | 18 | 12 |
| ESP | Pablo Carreño Busta | 19 | 13 |
| GER | Alexander Zverev | 20 | 14 |
| ESP | Albert Ramos Viñolas | 24 | 15 |
| URU | Pablo Cuevas | 26 | 16 |

- Rankings are as of April 10, 2017

=== Other entrants ===
The following players received wildcards into the main draw:

- (France) Jérémy Chardy
- (Croatia) Borna Ćorić
- (Norway) Casper Ruud
- (Italy) Andreas Seppi

The following players received entry using a protected ranking:

- (Germany) Tommy Haas
- (Spain) Tommy Robredo

The following players received entry from the qualifying draw:

- (Argentina) Carlos Berlocq
- (Spain) Guillermo García López
- (Slovakia) Martin Kližan
- (Russia) Andrey Kuznetsov
- (France) Adrian Mannarino
- (Argentina) Renzo Olivo
- (Germany) Jan-Lennard Struff

The following players received entry as lucky losers:

- (Bosnia and Herzegovina) Damir Džumhur
- (France) Pierre-Hugues Herbert

=== Withdrawals ===
Before the tournament

- (Spain) David Ferrer →replaced by (Russia) Daniil Medvedev
- (France) Richard Gasquet →replaced by (Georgia (country)) Nikoloz Basilashvili
- (Germany) Philipp Kohlschreiber →replaced by (France) Pierre-Hugues Herbert
- (Australia) Nick Kyrgios →replaced by (Bosnia and Herzegovina) Damir Džumhur
- (France) Gaël Monfils →replaced by (Spain) Nicolás Almagro
- (Canada) Milos Raonic →replaced by (Spain) Tommy Robredo

=== Retirements ===
- (France) Adrian Mannarino

== Doubles main-draw entrants ==
=== Seeds ===
| Country | Player | Country | Player | Rank | Seed |
|---|---|---|---|---|---|
| FIN | Henri Kontinen | AUS | John Peers | 3 | 1 |
| FRA | Pierre-Hugues Herbert | FRA | Nicolas Mahut | 12 | 2 |
| GBR | Jamie Murray | BRA | Bruno Soares | 17 | 3 |
| POL | Łukasz Kubot | BRA | Marcelo Melo | 19 | 4 |
| RSA | Raven Klaasen | USA | Rajeev Ram | 23 | 5 |
| CRO | Ivan Dodig | ESP | Marcel Granollers | 27 | 6 |
| ESP | Feliciano López | ESP | Marc López | 31 | 7 |
| NED | Jean-Julien Rojer | ROU | Horia Tecău | 35 | 8 |

- Rankings are as of April 10, 2017

=== Other entrants ===
The following pairs received wildcards into the doubles main draw:

- (Monaco) Romain Arneodo / (France) Hugo Nys
- (Bulgaria) Grigor Dimitrov / (Serbia) Nenad Zimonjić

The following pair received entry as alternates:

- (Italy) Paolo Lorenzi / (Spain) Albert Ramos Viñolas

=== Withdrawals ===
Before the tournament

- (Germany) Philipp Kohlschreiber

== Finals ==
=== Singles ===
- (Spain) Rafael Nadal defeated (Spain) Albert Ramos Viñolas, 6–1, 6–3

=== Doubles ===
- (India) Rohan Bopanna / (Uruguay) Pablo Cuevas defeated (Spain) Feliciano López / (Spain) Marc López, 6–3, 3–6, [10–4]
