= 2017 Monte-Carlo Rolex Masters – Singles =

Singles
- 2017 Monte-Carlo Rolex Masters

Final
- Champion: (Spain) Rafael Nadal
- Runner-up: (Spain) Albert Ramos Viñolas
- Score: 6–1, 6–3

Details
- Draw: 56 (7 Q / 4 WC )
- Seeds: 16

Events
Singles	Doubles
← 2016 ·	Monte-Carlo Rolex Masters	· 2018 →

Defending champion Rafael Nadal defeated Albert Ramos Viñolas in the final, 6–1, 6–3 to win the singles tennis title at the 2017 Monte-Carlo Masters. It was his record-extending 10th Monte Carlo Masters title, becoming the first man in the Open Era to win 10 singles titles at the same tournament. Nadal also claimed his Open Era record 50th clay court title.

== Seeds ==
The top eight seeds receive a bye into the second round.

1. (United Kingdom) Andy Murray (third round)
2. (Serbia) Novak Djokovic (quarterfinals)
3. (Switzerland) Stan Wawrinka (third round)
4. (Spain) Rafael Nadal (champion)
5. (Croatia) Marin Čilić (quarterfinals)
6. (Austria) Dominic Thiem (third round)
7. (France) Jo-Wilfried Tsonga (second round)
8. (Bulgaria) Grigor Dimitrov (second round)

9. (Czech Republic) Tomáš Berdych (third round)
10. (Belgium) David Goffin (semifinals)
11. (France) Lucas Pouille (semifinals)
12. (Spain) Roberto Bautista Agut (second round)
13. (Spain) Pablo Carreño Busta (third round)
14. (Germany) Alexander Zverev (third round)
15. (Spain) Albert Ramos Viñolas (final)
16. (Uruguay) Pablo Cuevas (quarterfinals)

Click on the seed number of a player to go to their draw section.

== Draw ==
=== Key ===
- Q = Qualifier
- WC = Wild card
- LL = Lucky loser
- Alt = Alternate
- SE = Special exempt
- PR = Protected ranking
- ITF = ITF entry
- JE = Junior exempt
- w/o = Walkover
- r = Retired
- d = Defaulted
- SR = Special ranking

=== Finals ===
Quarterfinals
15	(Spain) Albert Ramos Viñolas	6	6^{5}	6
5	(Croatia) Marin Čilić	2	7^{7}	2
16	(Uruguay) Pablo Cuevas	0	6	5
11	(France) Lucas Pouille	6	3	7
(Argentina) Diego Schwartzman	4	4
4	(Spain) Rafael Nadal	6	6
10	(Belgium) David Goffin	6	3	7
2	(Serbia) Novak Djokovic	2	6	5

Semifinals
15	(Spain) Albert Ramos Viñolas	6	5	6
11	(France) Lucas Pouille	3	7	1
4	(Spain) Rafael Nadal	6	6
10	(Belgium) David Goffin	3	1

Final
15	(Spain) Albert Ramos Viñolas	1	3
4	(Spain) Rafael Nadal	6	6

=== Top half ===
==== Section 1 ====
First round
(Luxembourg) G Müller	6	6
PR	(Spain) T Robredo	2	2
Q	(Argentina) C Berlocq	3	6	6
LL	(France) P-H Herbert	6	2	1
Q	(Argentina) R Olivo	2	3
15	(Spain) A Ramos Viñolas	6	6
9	(Czech Republic) T Berdych	4	6	6
Q	(Russia) A Kuznetsov	6	3	4
(France) B Paire	2	3
PR	(Germany) T Haas	6	6
WC	(Croatia) B Ćorić	6^{3}	6	3
WC	(France) J Chardy	7^{7}	3	6

Second round
1	(United Kingdom) A Murray	7	7
(Luxembourg) G Müller	5	5
Q	(Argentina) C Berlocq	2	2
15	(Spain) A Ramos Viñolas	6	6
9	(Czech Republic) T Berdych	3	6	6
PR	(Germany) T Haas	6	1	4
WC	(France) J Chardy	3	0
5	(Croatia) M Čilić	6	6

Third round
1	(United Kingdom) A Murray	6	2	5
15	(Spain) A Ramos Viñolas	2	6	7
9	(Czech Republic) T Berdych	2	6^{0}
5	(Croatia) M Čilić	6	7^{7}

Quarterfinals
15	(Spain) A Ramos Viñolas	6	6^{5}	6
5	(Croatia) M Čilić	2	7^{7}	2

==== Section 2 ====
First round
(Germany) M Zverev	6^{3}	3
(Czech Republic) J Veselý	7^{7}	6
(Germany) F Mayer	3	2
(Portugal) J Sousa	6	6
(Serbia) V Troicki	3	0
16	(Uruguay) P Cuevas	6	6
11	(France) L Pouille	6	6
(United States) R Harrison	2	4
(Spain) M Granollers	2	4
(Italy) P Lorenzi	6	6
Q	(France) A Mannarino	1	6	6
Q	(Spain) G García López	6	3	4

Second round
3	(Switzerland) S Wawrinka	6	4	6
(Czech Republic) J Veselý	2	6	2
(Portugal) J Sousa	3	3
16	(Uruguay) P Cuevas	6	6
11	(France) L Pouille	6	6
(Italy) P Lorenzi	2	4
Q	(France) A Mannarino	6^{3}	6	6
7	(France) J-W Tsonga	7^{7}	2	3

Third round
3	(Switzerland) S Wawrinka	4	4
16	(Uruguay) P Cuevas	6	6
11	(France) L Pouille	3
Q	(France) A Mannarino	0^{r}

Quarterfinals
16	(Uruguay) P Cuevas	0	6	5
11	(France) L Pouille	6	3	7

=== Bottom half ===
==== Section 3 ====
First round
Q	(Germany) J-L Struff	6	6
WC	(Norway) C Ruud	4	4
(Australia) B Tomic	1	6^{3}
(Argentina) D Schwartzman	6	7^{7}
(Georgia (country)) N Basilashvili	6	3	5
12	(Spain) R Bautista Agut	1	6	7
14	(Germany) A Zverev	6	6
WC	(Italy) A Seppi	1	2
(Spain) F López	7^{8}	7
(Russia) D Medvedev	6^{6}	5
(United Kingdom) D Evans	5	1
(United Kingdom) K Edmund	7	6

Second round
8	(Bulgaria) G Dimitrov	6	3	2
Q	(Germany) J-L Struff	4	6	6
(Argentina) D Schwartzman	6	7^{7}
12	(Spain) R Bautista Agut	3	6^{3}
14	(Germany) A Zverev	6	6
(Spain) F López	0	4
(United Kingdom) K Edmund	0	7	3
4	(Spain) R Nadal	6	5	6

Third round
Q	(Germany) J-L Struff	3	0
(Argentina) D Schwartzman	6	6
14	(Germany) A Zverev	1	1
4	(Spain) R Nadal	6	6

Quarterfinals
(Argentina) D Schwartzman	4	4
4	(Spain) R Nadal	6	6

==== Section 4 ====
First round
LL	(Bosnia and Herzegovina) D Džumhur	3	2
(Netherlands) R Haase	6	6
Q	(Slovakia) M Kližan	6	3	1
(Spain) N Almagro	4	6	6
(Belgium) S Darcis	2	1
10	(Belgium) D Goffin	6	6
13	(Spain) P Carreño Busta	7^{7}	6^{4}	6
(Italy) F Fognini	6^{0}	7^{7}	3
(Russia) K Khachanov	6	6
(France) N Mahut	2	4
(France) G Simon	6	6
(Tunisia) M Jaziri	2	2

Second round
6	(Austria) D Thiem	6	6
(Netherlands) R Haase	3	2
(Spain) N Almagro	5	1
10	(Belgium) D Goffin	7	6
13	(Spain) P Carreño Busta	6	6
(Russia) K Khachanov	4	4
(France) G Simon	3	6	5
2	(Serbia) N Djokovic	6	3	7

Third round
6	(Austria) D Thiem	6^{4}	6	3
10	(Belgium) D Goffin	7^{7}	4	6
13	(Spain) P Carreño Busta	2	6	4
2	(Serbia) N Djokovic	6	4	6

Quarterfinals
10	(Belgium) D Goffin	6	3	7
2	(Serbia) N Djokovic	2	6	5

== Qualifying ==
=== Seeds ===
1. (France) Adrian Mannarino (qualified)
2. (Germany) Jan-Lennard Struff (qualified)
3. (Slovakia) Martin Kližan (qualified)
4. (Argentina) Carlos Berlocq (qualified)
5. (Bosnia and Herzegovina) Damir Džumhur (qualifying competition, lucky loser)
6. (Russia) Andrey Kuznetsov (qualified)
7. (Kazakhstan) Mikhail Kukushkin (first round)
8. (France) Pierre-Hugues Herbert (qualifying competition, lucky loser)
9. (Moldova) Radu Albot (first round)
10. (Serbia) Dušan Lajović (first round)
11. (Russia) Mikhail Youzhny (qualifying competition)
12. (Argentina) Renzo Olivo (qualified)
13. (Japan) Yūichi Sugita (qualifying competition)
14. (Spain) Guillermo García López (qualified)

=== Qualifiers ===
1. (France) Adrian Mannarino
2. (Germany) Jan-Lennard Struff
3. (Slovakia) Martin Kližan
4. (Argentina) Carlos Berlocq
5. (Spain) Guillermo García López
6. (Russia) Andrey Kuznetsov
7. (Argentina) Renzo Olivo

=== Lucky losers ===
1. (Bosnia and Herzegovina) Damir Džumhur
2. (France) Pierre-Hugues Herbert

=== Qualifying draw ===
==== First qualifier ====
First round
1	(France) Adrian Mannarino	6	6
WC	(Monaco) Lucas Catarina	1	1
WC	(France) Hugo Nys	5	6	1
13	(Japan) Yūichi Sugita	7	3	6

Qualifying competition
1	(France) Adrian Mannarino	6	6
13	(Japan) Yūichi Sugita	3	4

==== Second qualifier ====
First round
2	(Germany) Jan-Lennard Struff	4	6	7^{7}
(France) Paul-Henri Mathieu	6	2	6^{3}
(Romania) Marius Copil	3	6	0
8	(France) Pierre-Hugues Herbert	6	3	6

Qualifying competition
2	(Germany) Jan-Lennard Struff	6	6
8	(France) Pierre-Hugues Herbert	3	2

==== Third qualifier ====
First round
3	(Slovakia) Martin Kližan	4	7^{7}	6
(Russia) Evgeny Donskoy	6	6^{5}	2
(Ukraine) Sergiy Stakhovsky	7^{7}	3	6
10	(Serbia) Dušan Lajović	6^{0}	6	3

Qualifying competition
3	(Slovakia) Martin Kližan	6	6
(Ukraine) Sergiy Stakhovsky	4	1

==== Fourth qualifier ====
First round
4	(Argentina) Carlos Berlocq	6	6
(Russia) Andrey Rublev	2	3
Alt	(Spain) Roberto Carballés Baena	6	6
9	(Moldova) Radu Albot	3	3

Qualifying competition
4	(Argentina) Carlos Berlocq	6	6
Alt	(Spain) Roberto Carballés Baena	2	3

==== Fifth qualifier ====
First round
5	(Bosnia and Herzegovina) Damir Džumhur	6	7
(Italy) Alessandro Giannessi	3	5
WC	(France) Florent Diep	3	2
14	(Spain) Guillermo García López	6	6

Qualifying competition
5	(Bosnia and Herzegovina) Damir Džumhur	0	6	5
14	(Spain) Guillermo García López	6	4	7

==== Sixth qualifier ====
First round
6	(Russia) Andrey Kuznetsov	6	6
(France) Julien Benneteau	1	3
(Japan) Taro Daniel	3	6	6^{4}
11	(Russia) Mikhail Youzhny	6	1	7^{7}

Qualifying competition
6	(Russia) Andrey Kuznetsov	3	7^{7}	7^{7}
11	(Russia) Mikhail Youzhny	6	6^{2}	6^{5}

==== Seventh qualifier ====
First round
7	(Kazakhstan) Mikhail Kukushkin	2	3
WC	(Italy) Simone Bolelli	6	6
(Slovakia) Jozef Kovalík	6	3	2
12	(Argentina) Renzo Olivo	1	6	6

Qualifying competition
WC	(Italy) Simone Bolelli	4	7^{7}	2
12	(Argentina) Renzo Olivo	6	6^{5}	6
