= 2017 Dubai Tennis Championships =

- Date: 20–26 February (women); 27 February – 4 March (men)
- Edition: 25th (men) / 17th (women)
- Category: ATP World Tour 500 (men); WTA Premier 5 (women)
- Draw: 32S / 16D (men); 56S / 28D (women)
- Prize money: $ (ATP) $2,666,000 (WTA)
- Surface: Hard, Outdoor
- Location: Dubai, United Arab Emirates
- Venue: Aviation Club Tennis Centre

Champions

Men's singles
- (United Kingdom) Andy Murray

Women's singles
- (Ukraine) Elina Svitolina

Men's doubles
- (Netherlands) Jean-Julien Rojer / (Romania) Horia Tecău

Women's doubles
- (Russia) Ekaterina Makarova / (Russia) Elena Vesnina
- Dubai Tennis Championships

The 2017 Dubai Tennis Championships (also known as the 2017 Dubai Duty Free Tennis Championships for sponsorship reasons) was an ATP 500 event on the 2017 ATP World Tour and a WTA Premier 5 on the 2017 WTA Tour. Both events were held at the Aviation Club Tennis Centre in Dubai, United Arab Emirates. The women's tournament took place from February 20 to 26, 2017 while the men's tournament took place from February 27 through March 4, 2017.

== Points and prize money ==
=== Point distribution ===
Event	W	F	SF	QF	Round of 16	Round of 32	Round of 56	Q	Q2	Q1
Men's singles	500	300	180	90	45	0	—N/a	20	10	0
Men's doubles	500	300	180	90	0	—N/a	—N/a	45	25	0
Women's singles	900	585	350	190	105	60	1	30	20	1
Women's doubles	900	585	350	190	105	1	—N/a	—N/a	—N/a	—N/a

=== Prize money ===
Event	W	F	SF	QF	Round of 16	Round of 32	Round of 56	Q2	Q1
Men's singles	$523,330	$256,565	$129,100	$65,655	$34,100	$17,980	—N/a	$3,980	$2,030
Men's doubles	$157,570	$77,140	$38,690	$19,860	$10,270	—N/a	—N/a	—N/a	—N/a
Women's singles	$457,245	$243,621	$121,690	$56,115	$27,790	$14,265	$7,335	$4,080	$2,099
Women's doubles	$139,300	$70,480	$34,880	$17,560	$8,900	$4,395	—N/a	—N/a	—N/a
Doubles prize money per team

== ATP singles main-draw entrants ==
=== Seeds ===
Country	Player	Ranking^{1}	Seed
GBR	Andy Murray	1	1
SUI	Stan Wawrinka	3	2
SUI	Roger Federer	9	3
FRA	Gaël Monfils	12	4
CZE	Tomáš Berdych	14	5
ESP	Roberto Bautista Agut	15	6
FRA	Lucas Pouille	17	7
LUX	Gilles Müller	27	8

- Rankings are as of February 20, 2017.

=== Other entrants ===
The following players received wildcards into the singles main draw:

- (United Arab Emirates) Omar Alawadhi
- (Spain) Roberto Bautista Agut
- (Egypt) Mohamed Safwat

The following players received entry from the qualifying draw:

- (Romania) Marius Copil
- (Russia) Evgeny Donskoy
- (Uzbekistan) Denis Istomin
- (Czech Republic) Lukáš Rosol

The following player received entry as a lucky loser:

- (Italy) Andreas Seppi

=== Withdrawals ===
Before the tournament

- (Cyprus) Marcos Baghdatis → replaced by (Spain) Guillermo García López
- (Germany) Florian Mayer → replaced by (Italy) Andreas Seppi

=== Retirements ===
- (Czech Republic) Lukáš Rosol (left leg injury)

== ATP doubles main-draw entrants ==
=== Seeds ===
Country	Player	Country	Player	Rank^{1}	Seed
FIN	Henri Kontinen	AUS	John Peers	11	1
CRO	Ivan Dodig	ESP	Marcel Granollers	27	2
CAN	Daniel Nestor	FRA	Édouard Roger-Vasselin	36	3
NED	Jean-Julien Rojer	ROU	Horia Tecău	45	4

- Rankings are as of February 20, 2017.

=== Other entrants ===
The following pairs received wildcards into the doubles main draw:

- (United Arab Emirates) Omar Alawadhi / (Iran) Amirvala Madanchi
- (Republic of Ireland) James McGee / (Republic of Ireland) David O'Hare

The following pair received entry from the qualifying draw:

- (United States) James Cerretani / (Austria) Philipp Oswald

=== Withdrawals ===
During the tournament

- (France) Lucas Pouille (bicep strain)

== WTA singles main-draw entrants ==
=== Seeds ===
Country	Player	Ranking^{1}	Seed
GER	Angelique Kerber	2	1
CZE	Karolína Plíšková	3	2
SVK	Dominika Cibulková	5	3
POL	Agnieszka Radwańska	6	4
ESP	Garbiñe Muguruza	7	5
~~GBR~~	~~Johanna Konta~~	~~10~~	~~6~~
UKR	Elina Svitolina	13	7
RUS	Elena Vesnina	16	8
CZE	Barbora Strýcová	17	9
DEN	Caroline Wozniacki	18	10
USA	CoCo Vandeweghe	20	11
AUS	Samantha Stosur	21	12
NED	Kiki Bertens	22	13
RUS	Anastasia Pavlyuchenkova	23	14
FRA	Caroline Garcia	24	15
ITA	Roberta Vinci	25	16
KAZ	Yulia Putintseva	27	17

- Rankings were as of February 13, 2017.

=== Other entrants ===
The following players received wildcards into the singles main draw:

- (Germany) Mona Barthel
- (Turkey) Çağla Büyükakçay
- (China) Peng Shuai

The following players received entry from the qualifying draw:

- (Chinese Taipei) Chang Kai-chen
- (Tunisia) Ons Jabeur
- (Belgium) Elise Mertens
- (Belarus) Aryna Sabalenka
- (Spain) Sílvia Soler Espinosa
- (China) Zhang Kailin
- (China) Zheng Saisai
- (China) Zhu Lin

The following player received entry as a lucky loser:

- (Luxembourg) Mandy Minella

=== Withdrawals ===
- (Switzerland) Timea Bacsinszky → replaced by (United States) Catherine Bellis
- (Canada) Eugenie Bouchard → replaced by (Czech Republic) Kristýna Plíšková
- (United States) Louisa Chirico → replaced by (United States) Madison Brengle
- (France) Alizé Cornet → replaced by (Spain) Lara Arruabarrena
- (Italy) Sara Errani → replaced by (Ukraine) Lesia Tsurenko
- (Romania) Simona Halep → replaced by (Serbia) Jelena Janković
- (United Kingdom) Johanna Konta → replaced by (Luxembourg) Mandy Minella
- (Italy) Karin Knapp → replaced by (Sweden) Johanna Larsson
- (Russia) Svetlana Kuznetsova → replaced by (Switzerland) Viktorija Golubic
- (Romania) Monica Niculescu → replaced by (China) Wang Qiang
- (Spain) Carla Suárez Navarro → replaced by (Bulgaria) Tsvetana Pironkova

== WTA doubles main-draw entrants ==
=== Seeds ===
Country	Player	Country	Player	Rank^{1}	Seed
FRA	Caroline Garcia	FRA	Kristina Mladenovic	6	1
RUS	Ekaterina Makarova	RUS	Elena Vesnina	11	2
IND	Sania Mirza	CZE	Barbora Strýcová	19	3
TPE	Chan Yung-jan	SUI	Martina Hingis	21	4
TPE	Chan Hao-ching	KAZ	Yaroslava Shvedova	24	5
CZE	Andrea Hlaváčková	CHN	Peng Shuai	26	6
USA	Abigail Spears	SLO	Katarina Srebotnik	46	7
CZE	Lucie Hradecká	CZE	Kateřina Siniaková	48	8

- Rankings were as of February 13, 2017.

=== Other entrants ===
The following pair received a wildcard into the doubles main draw:

- (Oman) Fatma Al-Nabhani / (Germany) Mona Barthel

== Finals ==
=== Men's singles ===
- (United Kingdom) Andy Murray defeated (Spain) Fernando Verdasco, 6–3, 6–2

=== Women's singles ===
- (Ukraine) Elina Svitolina defeated (Denmark) Caroline Wozniacki, 6–4, 6–2

=== Men's doubles ===
- (Netherlands) Jean-Julien Rojer / (Romania) Horia Tecău defeated (India) Rohan Bopanna / (Poland) Marcin Matkowski, 4–6, 6–3, [10–3]

=== Women's doubles ===
- (Russia) Ekaterina Makarova / (Russia) Elena Vesnina defeated (Czech Republic) Andrea Hlaváčková / (China) Peng Shuai, 6–2, 4–6, [10–7]
