= 2017 Dubai Tennis Championships – Women's singles =

Women's singles
- 2017 Dubai Tennis Championships

Final
- Champion: (Ukraine) Elina Svitolina
- Runner-up: (Denmark) Caroline Wozniacki
- Score: 6–4, 6–2

Details
- Draw: 56
- Seeds: 16

Events
Singles	men	women
Doubles	men	women
- Dubai Tennis Championships

Elina Svitolina defeated Caroline Wozniacki in the final, 6–4, 6–2 to win the women's singles tennis title at the 2017 Dubai Tennis Championships.

Sara Errani was the reigning champion, but withdrew before the tournament due to an adductor problem.

Angelique Kerber was in contention to regain the world No. 1 ranking by winning the title, but lost in the semifinals to Svitolina. This event marked the WTA Tour debut of future world No. 1 Aryna Sabalenka; she lost in the first round to Kateryna Volodko.

== Seeds ==
The top eight seeds received a bye into the second round.

1. (Germany) Angelique Kerber (semifinals)
2. (Czech Republic) Karolína Plíšková (second round)
3. (Slovakia) Dominika Cibulková (second round)
4. (Poland) Agnieszka Radwańska (third round)
5. (Spain) Garbiñe Muguruza (second round, retired)
6. (United Kingdom) Johanna Konta (withdrew)
7. (Ukraine) Elina Svitolina (champion)
8. (Russia) Elena Vesnina (third round)
9. (Czech Republic) Barbora Strýcová (second round)
10. (Denmark) Caroline Wozniacki (final)
11. (United States) CoCo Vandeweghe (first round)
12. (Australia) Samantha Stosur (second round)
13. (Netherlands) Kiki Bertens (first round)
14. (Russia) Anastasia Pavlyuchenkova (first round)
15. (France) Caroline Garcia (second round)
16. (Italy) Roberta Vinci (first round)
17. (Kazakhstan) Yulia Putintseva (first round)

== Draw ==
Key

- Q = Qualifier
- WC = Wild card
- LL = Lucky loser
- Alt = Alternate
- ITF = ITF entry
- PR = Protected ranking
- SR = Special ranking
- SE = Special exempt
- JE = Junior exempt
- JR = Junior Accelerator Programme entrant
- CO = College Accelerator Programme entrant
- NG = Next Gen Accelerator Program entrant
- w/o = Walkover
- r = Retired
- d = Defaulted

=== Finals ===
Quarterfinals
1	(Germany) Angelique Kerber	6	6
(Croatia) Ana Konjuh	3	2
(United States) Lauren Davis	0	4
7	(Ukraine) Elina Svitolina	6	6
10	(Denmark) Caroline Wozniacki	6	6
(United States) Catherine Bellis	3	2
(Latvia) Anastasija Sevastova	6	7
(China) Wang Qiang	4	5

Semifinals
1	(Germany) Angelique Kerber	3	6^{3}
7	(Ukraine) Elina Svitolina	6	7^{7}
10	(Denmark) Caroline Wozniacki	6	6
(Latvia) Anastasija Sevastova	3	4

Final
7	(Ukraine) Elina Svitolina	6	6
10	(Denmark) Caroline Wozniacki	4	2

=== Top half ===
==== Section 1 ====
First round
(Serbia) J Janković	1	3
WC	(Germany) M Barthel	6	6
(Kazakhstan) Y Shvedova	3	6	4
(Puerto Rico) M Puig	6	4	6
(Sweden) J Larsson	3	3
15	(France) C Garcia	6	6
12	(Australia) S Stosur	6	6
Q	(China) K Zhang	3	3
(China) S Zhang	0	1
(Croatia) A Konjuh	6	6
(United States) M Brengle	2	7^{7}	3
(Japan) M Doi	6	6^{4}	6

Second round
1	(Germany) A Kerber	6	6
WC	(Germany) M Barthel	4	3
(Puerto Rico) M Puig	6	4	6
15	(France) C Garcia	1	6	2
12	(Australia) S Stosur	4	3
(Croatia) A Konjuh	6	6
(Japan) M Doi	2	5
8	(Russia) E Vesnina	6	7

Third round
1	(Germany) A Kerber	6	6
(Puerto Rico) M Puig	2	3
(Croatia) A Konjuh	3	6	7^{7}
8	(Russia) E Vesnina	6	4	6^{4}

Quarterfinals
1	(Germany) A Kerber	6	6
(Croatia) A Konjuh	3	2

==== Section 2 ====
First round
(Russia) E Makarova	6	6
Q	(China) L Zhu	3	1
(United States) L Davis	2	6	6
LL	(Luxembourg) M Minella	6	2	1
(Czech Republic) Kr Plíšková	3	7	6
16	(Italy) R Vinci	6	5	3
13	(Netherlands) K Bertens	7^{7}	3	4
(United States) C McHale	6^{5}	6	6
Q	(Chinese Taipei) K-c Chang	2	4
(Japan) N Osaka	6	6
Q	(China) S Zheng	6	3	6
(Spain) L Arruabarrena	4	6	3

Second round
3	(Slovakia) D Cibulková	2	6	2
(Russia) E Makarova	6	4	6
(United States) L Davis	1	6	6
(Czech Republic) Kr Plíšková	6	1	3
(United States) C McHale	6	6
(Japan) N Osaka	3	4
Q	(China) S Zheng	5	1
7	(Ukraine) E Svitolina	7	6

Third round
(Russia) E Makarova	6	1	3
(United States) L Davis	4	6	6
(United States) C McHale	6	4	3
7	(Ukraine) E Svitolina	4	6	6

Quarterfinals
(United States) L Davis	0	4
7	(Ukraine) E Svitolina	6	6

=== Bottom half ===
==== Section 3 ====
First round
(Ukraine) K Bondarenko	4	6	6
Q	(Belarus) A Sabalenka	6	4	3
WC	(Turkey) Ç Büyükakçay	7^{7}	3	2
(Switzerland) V Golubic	6^{4}	6	6
(Russia) D Kasatkina	2	5
10	(Denmark) C Wozniacki	6	7
17	(Kazakhstan) Y Putintseva	1	5
(United States) C Bellis	6	7
(Germany) L Siegemund	6^{4}	6	7^{7}
Q	(Spain) S Soler Espinosa	7^{7}	4	6^{3}
(Bulgaria) T Pironkova	3	2
Q	(Belgium) E Mertens	6	6

Second round
5	(Spain) G Muguruza	1^{r}
(Ukraine) K Bondarenko	4
(Switzerland) V Golubic	4	2
10	(Denmark) C Wozniacki	6	6
(United States) C Bellis	7	7^{7}
(Germany) L Siegemund	5	6^{3}
Q	(Belgium) E Mertens	3	2
4	(Poland) A Radwańska	6	6

Third round
(Ukraine) K Bondarenko	6	2	3
10	(Denmark) C Wozniacki	3	6	6
(United States) C Bellis	6	2	6
4	(Poland) A Radwańska	4	6	2

Quarterfinals
10	(Denmark) C Wozniacki	6	6
(United States) C Bellis	3	2

==== Section 4 ====
First round
WC	(China) S Peng	6	6
(Ukraine) L Tsurenko	1	1
(Romania) I-C Begu	1	5
(Latvia) A Sevastova	6	7
(United States) A Riske	6	6
11	(United States) C Vandeweghe	4	4
14	(Russia) A Pavlyuchenkova	6^{6}	6	4
Q	(Tunisia) O Jabeur	7^{8}	2	6
(China) Q Wang	7^{7}	6
(Latvia) J Ostapenko	6^{1}	2
(France) K Mladenovic	6	6
(Czech Republic) K Siniaková	3	3

Second round
9	(Czech Republic) B Strýcová	3	2
WC	(China) S Peng	6	6
(Latvia) A Sevastova	6	6^{3}	6
(United States) A Riske	4	7^{7}	2
Q	(Tunisia) O Jabeur	3	1
(China) Q Wang	6	6
(France) K Mladenovic	6	6
2	(Czech Republic) Ka Plíšková	2	4

Third round
WC	(China) S Peng	4	3
(Latvia) A Sevastova	6	6
(China) Q Wang	6	6
(France) K Mladenovic	1	4

Quarterfinals
(Latvia) A Sevastova	6	7
(China) Q Wang	4	5

== Qualifying ==
=== Seeds ===
1. (China) Duan Yingying (first round)
2. (Luxembourg) Mandy Minella (qualifying competition, lucky loser)
3. (Belgium) Elise Mertens (qualified)
4. (Russia) Natalia Vikhlyantseva (qualifying competition)
5. (Japan) Risa Ozaki (qualifying competition)
6. (China) Zheng Saisai (qualified)
7. (Japan) Nao Hibino (first round)
8. (United States) Julia Boserup (qualifying competition)
9. (Romania) Patricia Maria Țig (qualifying competition)
10. (China) Zhu Lin (qualified)
11. (Chinese Taipei) Chang Kai-chen (qualified)
12. (Spain) Sílvia Soler Espinosa (qualified)
13. (China) Zhang Kailin (qualified)
14. (Belarus) Aryna Sabalenka (qualified)
15. (Czech Republic) Lucie Hradecká (first round)
16. (Brazil) Paula Cristina Gonçalves (first round)

=== Qualifiers ===
1. (Belarus) Aryna Sabalenka
2. (China) Zhu Lin
3. (Belgium) Elise Mertens
4. (China) Zhang Kailin
5. (Spain) Sílvia Soler Espinosa
6. (China) Zheng Saisai
7. (Tunisia) Ons Jabeur
8. (Chinese Taipei) Chang Kai-chen

=== Lucky loser ===
1. (Luxembourg) Mandy Minella

=== Draw ===
==== First qualifier ====
First round
1	(China) Duan Yingying	3	3
(Bulgaria) Aleksandrina Naydenova	6	6
WC	(Ukraine) Lyudmyla Kichenok	5	0
14	(Belarus) Aryna Sabalenka	7	6

Qualifying competition
(Bulgaria) Aleksandrina Naydenova	2	2
14	(Belarus) Aryna Sabalenka	6	6

==== Second qualifier ====
First round
2	(Luxembourg) Mandy Minella	7	6
(Switzerland) Amra Sadiković	5	2
(Slovakia) Michaela Hončová	1	4
10	(China) Zhu Lin	6	6

Qualifying competition
2	(Luxembourg) Mandy Minella	1	5
10	(China) Zhu Lin	6	7

==== Third qualifier ====
First round
3	(Belgium) Elise Mertens	6	6
(Czech Republic) Andrea Hlaváčková	1	3
PR	(Japan) Ayumi Morita	0^{r}
9	(Romania) Patricia Maria Țig	3

Qualifying competition
3	(Belgium) Elise Mertens	6^{3}	6	6
9	(Romania) Patricia Maria Țig	7^{7}	3	4

==== Fourth qualifier ====
First round
4	(Russia) Natalia Vikhlyantseva	6	6
(Croatia) Darija Jurak	3	2
(Poland) Alicja Rosolska	3	3
13	(China) Zhang Kailin	6	6

Qualifying competition
4	(Russia) Natalia Vikhlyantseva	3	0
13	(China) Zhang Kailin	6	6

==== Fifth qualifier ====
First round
5	(Japan) Risa Ozaki	6	6
WC	(Ukraine) Nadiia Kichenok	3	4
(Ukraine) Olga Savchuk
12	(Spain) Sílvia Soler Espinosa	w/o

Qualifying competition
5	(Japan) Risa Ozaki	4	3
12	(Spain) Sílvia Soler Espinosa	6	6

==== Sixth qualifier ====
First round
6	(China) Zheng Saisai	7	6
(Slovenia) Andreja Klepač	5	4
(Spain) María José Martínez Sánchez	6	6
15	(Czech Republic) Lucie Hradecká	3	4

Qualifying competition
6	(China) Zheng Saisai	6	6
(Spain) María José Martínez Sánchez	3	2

==== Seventh qualifier ====
First round
7	(Japan) Nao Hibino	6^{6}	6	6^{9}
(Canada) Gabriela Dabrowski	7^{8}	4	7^{11}
(Tunisia) Ons Jabeur	6	6
16	(Brazil) Paula Cristina Gonçalves	3	3

Qualifying competition
(Canada) Gabriela Dabrowski	6	6^{5}	1
(Tunisia) Ons Jabeur	4	7^{7}	6

==== Eighth qualifier ====
First round
8	(United States) Julia Boserup	1	7	7^{7}
(Australia) Anastasia Rodionova	6	5	6^{1}
WC	(Oman) Fatma Al-Nabhani	0	1
11	(Chinese Taipei) Chang Kai-chen	6	6

Qualifying competition
8	(United States) Julia Boserup	2	4
11	(Chinese Taipei) Chang Kai-chen	6	6
