= 2017 Dubai Tennis Championships – Women's doubles =

Women's doubles
- 2017 Dubai Tennis Championships

Final
- Champions: (Russia) Ekaterina Makarova (Russia) Elena Vesnina
- Runners-up: (Czech Republic) Andrea Hlaváčková (China) Peng Shuai
- Score: 6–2, 4–6, [10–7]

Events
Singles	men	women
Doubles	men	women
- Dubai Tennis Championships

Chuang Chia-jung and Darija Jurak were the defending champions, but chose not to participate together. Chuang played alongside Zheng Saisai, but lost in the first round to Gabriela Dabrowski and Jeļena Ostapenko. Jurak teamed up with Anastasia Rodionova, but lost in the second round to Dabrowski and Ostapenko.

Ekaterina Makarova and Elena Vesnina won the title, defeating Andrea Hlaváčková and Peng Shuai in the final, 6–2, 4–6, [10–7].

== Seeds ==
The first four seeds received a bye into the second round.

1. (France) Caroline Garcia / (France) Kristina Mladenovic (quarterfinals)
2. (Russia) Ekaterina Makarova / (Russia) Elena Vesnina (champions)
3. (India) Sania Mirza / (Czech Republic) Barbora Strýcová (semifinals)
4. (Chinese Taipei) Chan Yung-jan / (Switzerland) Martina Hingis (quarterfinals)
5. (Chinese Taipei) Chan Hao-ching / (Kazakhstan) Yaroslava Shvedova (semifinals)
6. (Czech Republic) Andrea Hlaváčková / (China) Peng Shuai (final)
7. (United States) Abigail Spears / (Slovenia) Katarina Srebotnik (quarterfinals)
8. (Czech Republic) Lucie Hradecká / (Czech Republic) Kateřina Siniaková (first round)

== Draw ==
Key

- Q = Qualifier
- WC = Wild card
- LL = Lucky loser
- Alt = Alternate
- ITF = ITF entry
- PR = Protected ranking
- SR = Special ranking
- SE = Special exempt
- JE = Junior exempt
- JR = Junior Accelerator Programme entrant
- CO = College Accelerator Programme entrant
- NG = Next Gen Accelerator Program entrant
- w/o = Walkover
- r = Retired
- d = Defaulted

=== Finals ===
Semifinals
5	(Chinese Taipei) Chan Hao-ching (Kazakhstan) Yaroslava Shvedova	1	3
6	(Czech Republic) Andrea Hlaváčková (China) Peng Shuai	6	6
3	(India) Sania Mirza (Czech Republic) Barbora Strýcová	4	3
2	(Russia) Ekaterina Makarova (Russia) Elena Vesnina	6	6

Final
6	(Czech Republic) Andrea Hlaváčková (China) Peng Shuai	2	6	[7]
2	(Russia) Ekaterina Makarova (Russia) Elena Vesnina	6	4	[10]

=== Top half ===
First round
(United States) R Atawo (China) Y Xu	4	2
(Switzerland) V Golubic (Czech Republic) Kr Plíšková	6	6
(Ukraine) K Bondarenko (Ukraine) E Svitolina	7	6^{3}	[6]
(Romania) I-C Begu (Russia) D Kasatkina	5	7^{7}	[10]
(Belgium) E Mertens (Bulgaria) A Naydenova	4	2
5	(Chinese Taipei) H-c Chan (Kazakhstan) Y Shvedova	6	6
(Germany) A-L Grönefeld (Czech Republic) K Peschke	4	6	[11]
WC	(Oman) F Al-Nabhani (Germany) M Barthel	6	1	[9]
(Turkey) Ç Büyükakçay (Russia) N Vikhlyantseva	1	2
(Luxembourg) M Minella (Latvia) A Sevastova	6	6
(China) C Liang (China) Z Yang	5	2
6	(Czech Republic) A Hlaváčková (China) S Peng	7	6

Second round
1	(France) C Garcia (France) K Mladenovic	7	4	[10]
(Switzerland) V Golubic (Czech Republic) Kr Plíšková	5	6	[5]
(Romania) I-C Begu (Russia) D Kasatkina	3	3
5	(Chinese Taipei) H-c Chan (Kazakhstan) Y Shvedova	6	6
4	(Chinese Taipei) Y-j Chan (Switzerland) M Hingis	4	6	[14]
(Germany) A-L Grönefeld (Czech Republic) K Peschke	6	3	[12]
(Luxembourg) M Minella (Latvia) A Sevastova	5	2
6	(Czech Republic) A Hlaváčková (China) S Peng	7	6

Quarterfinals
1	(France) C Garcia (France) K Mladenovic	5	6	[3]
5	(Chinese Taipei) H-c Chan (Kazakhstan) Y Shvedova	7	3	[10]
4	(Chinese Taipei) Y-j Chan (Switzerland) M Hingis	4	2
6	(Czech Republic) A Hlaváčková (China) S Peng	6	6

Semifinals
5	(Chinese Taipei) H-c Chan (Kazakhstan) Y Shvedova	1	3
6	(Czech Republic) A Hlaváčková (China) S Peng	6	6

=== Bottom half ===
First round
7	(United States) A Spears (Slovenia) K Srebotnik	6	6
(Ukraine) L Kichenok (Ukraine) N Kichenok	2	3
(Romania) R Olaru (Ukraine) O Savchuk	4	7^{7}	[10]
(Japan) N Hibino (Poland) A Rosolska	6	6^{4}	[4]
(Netherlands) K Bertens (Sweden) J Larsson	7^{9}	6
(Russia) N Dzalamidze (Russia) V Kudermetova	6^{7}	3
8	(Czech Republic) L Hradecká (Czech Republic) K Siniaková	5	2
(Croatia) D Jurak (Australia) An Rodionova	7	6
(Chinese Taipei) C-j Chuang (China) S Zheng	3	1
(Canada) G Dabrowski (Latvia) J Ostapenko	6	6
(Serbia) J Janković (Russia) A Pavlyuchenkova	4	4
(Slovenia) A Klepač (Spain) MJ Martínez Sánchez	6	6

Second round
7	(United States) A Spears (Slovenia) K Srebotnik	6	6
(Romania) R Olaru (Ukraine) O Savchuk	4	3
(Netherlands) K Bertens (Sweden) J Larsson	3	5
3	(India) S Mirza (Czech Republic) B Strýcová	6	7
(Croatia) D Jurak (Australia) An Rodionova	6^{6}	1
(Canada) G Dabrowski (Latvia) J Ostapenko	7^{8}	6
(Slovenia) A Klepač (Spain) MJ Martínez Sánchez	3	6^{5}
2	(Russia) E Makarova (Russia) E Vesnina	6	7^{7}

Quarterfinals
7	(United States) A Spears (Slovenia) K Srebotnik	2	5
3	(India) S Mirza (Czech Republic) B Strýcová	6	7
(Canada) G Dabrowski (Latvia) J Ostapenko	1	6	[5]
2	(Russia) E Makarova (Russia) E Vesnina	6	3	[10]

Semifinals
3	(India) S Mirza (Czech Republic) B Strýcová	4	3
2	(Russia) E Makarova (Russia) E Vesnina	6	6
