= 2018 ATP World Tour =

Men's tennis circuit

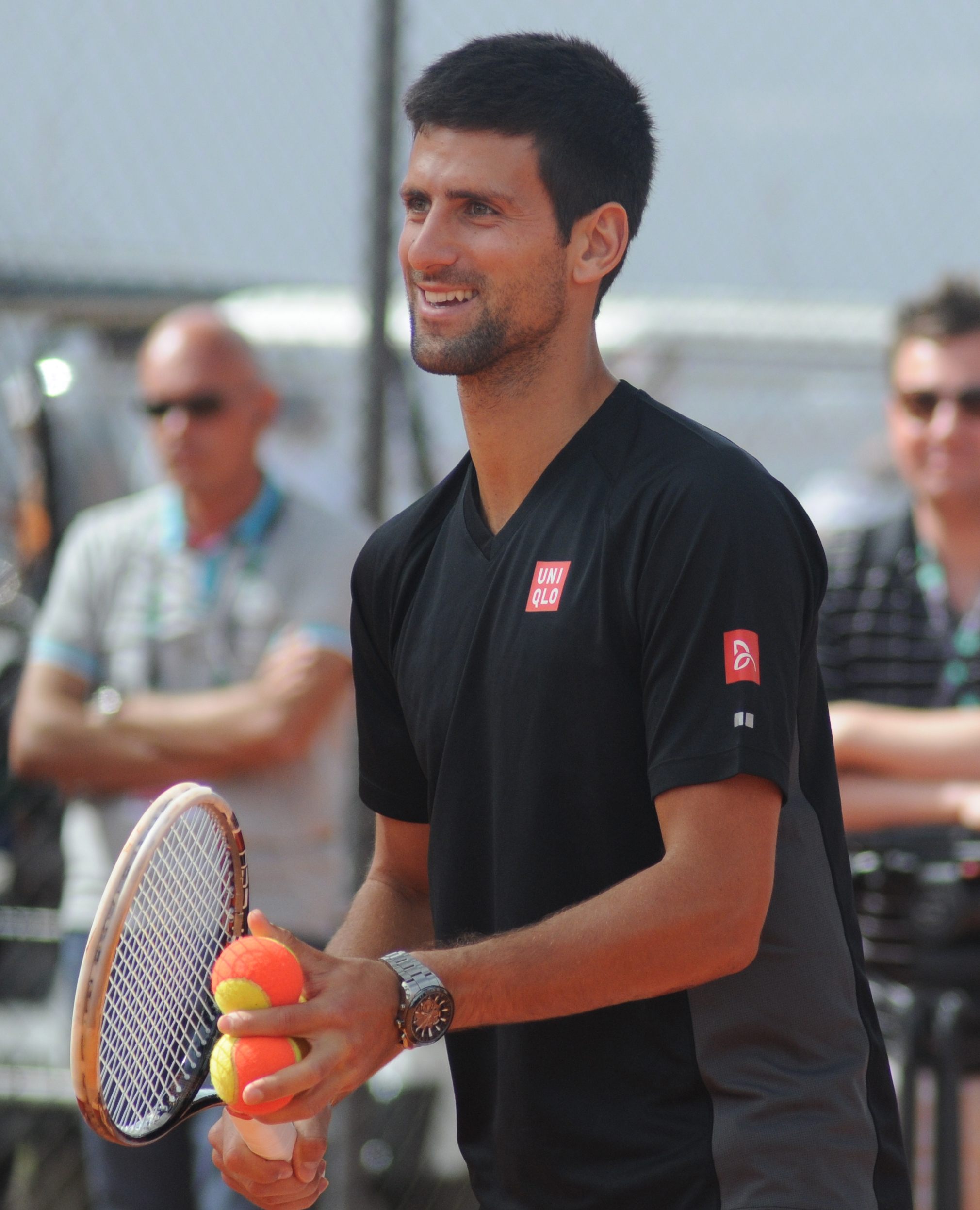
- Novak Djokovic finished the year as world No. 1 for the fifth time in his career. He won four tournaments during the season, including two majors at the Wimbledon Championships and the US Open. He also won two Masters 1000 events.

Details
- Duration: 30 Dec 2017 – 25 Nov 2018
- Edition: 49th
- Tournaments: 68
- Categories: Grand Slam (4); ATP Finals; ATP World Tour Masters 1000 (9); ATP World Tour 500 (13); ATP World Tour 250 (40)

Achievements (singles)
- Most titles: (Spain) Rafael Nadal (5)
- Most finals: (Serbia) Novak Djokovic (Switzerland) Roger Federer (7)
- Prize money leader: (Serbia) Novak Djokovic ($15,967,184)
- Points leader: (Serbia) Novak Djokovic (9,045)

Awards
- Player of the year: (Serbia) Novak Djokovic
- Doubles team of the year: (Austria) Oliver Marach (Croatia) Mate Pavić
- Most improved player of the year: (Greece) Stefanos Tsitsipas
- Newcomer of the year: (Australia) Alex de Minaur
- Comeback player of the year: (Serbia) Novak Djokovic

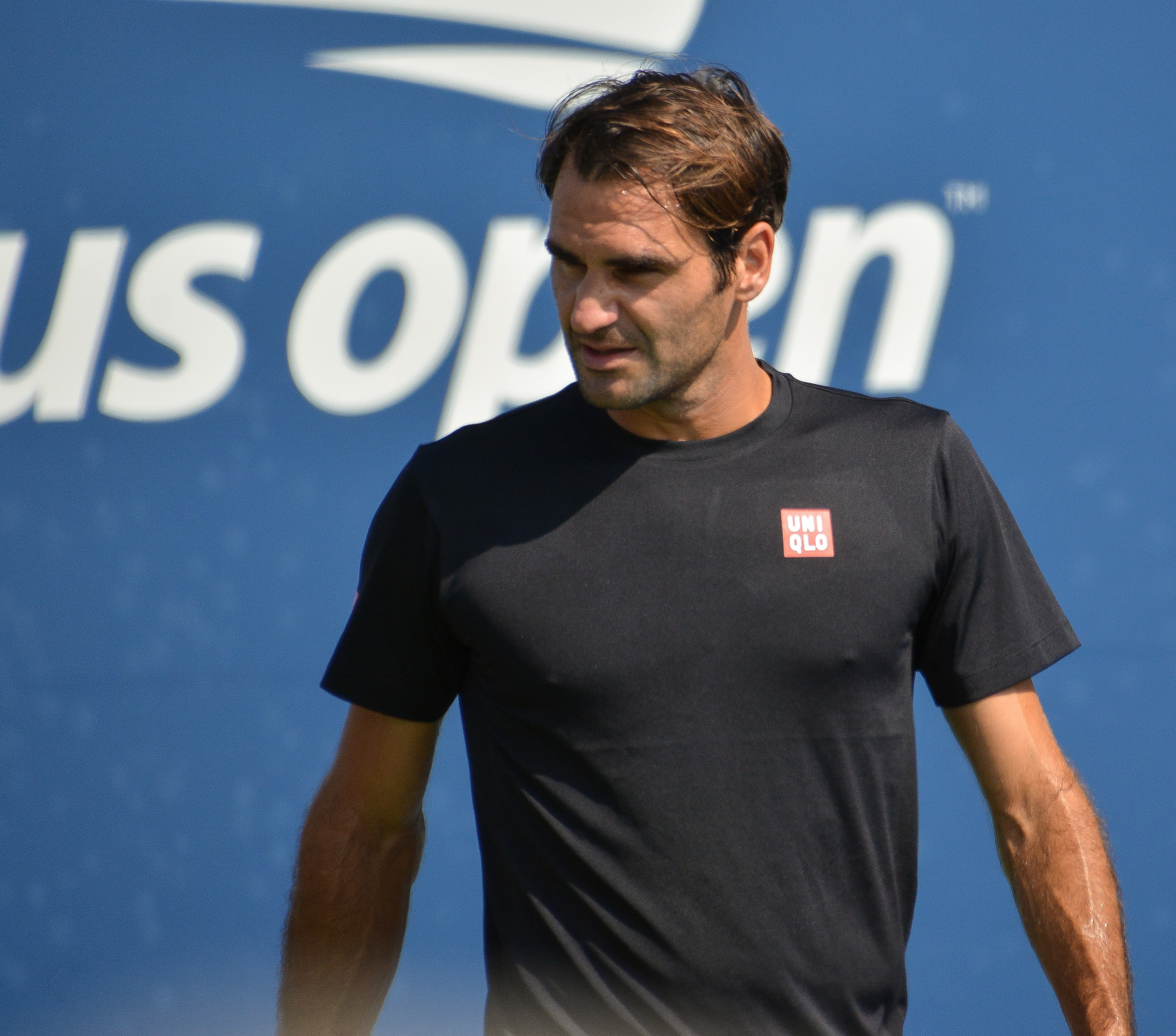
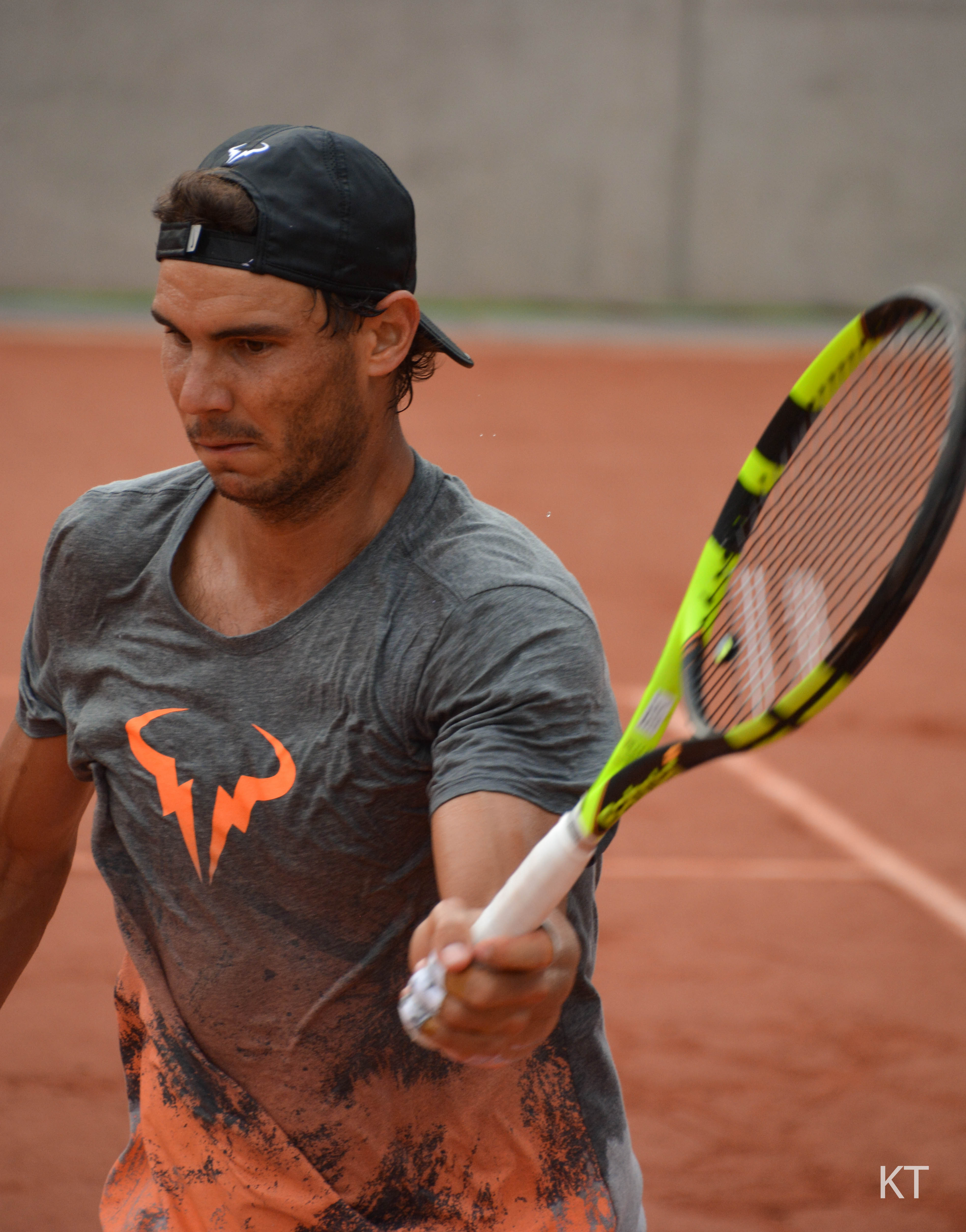
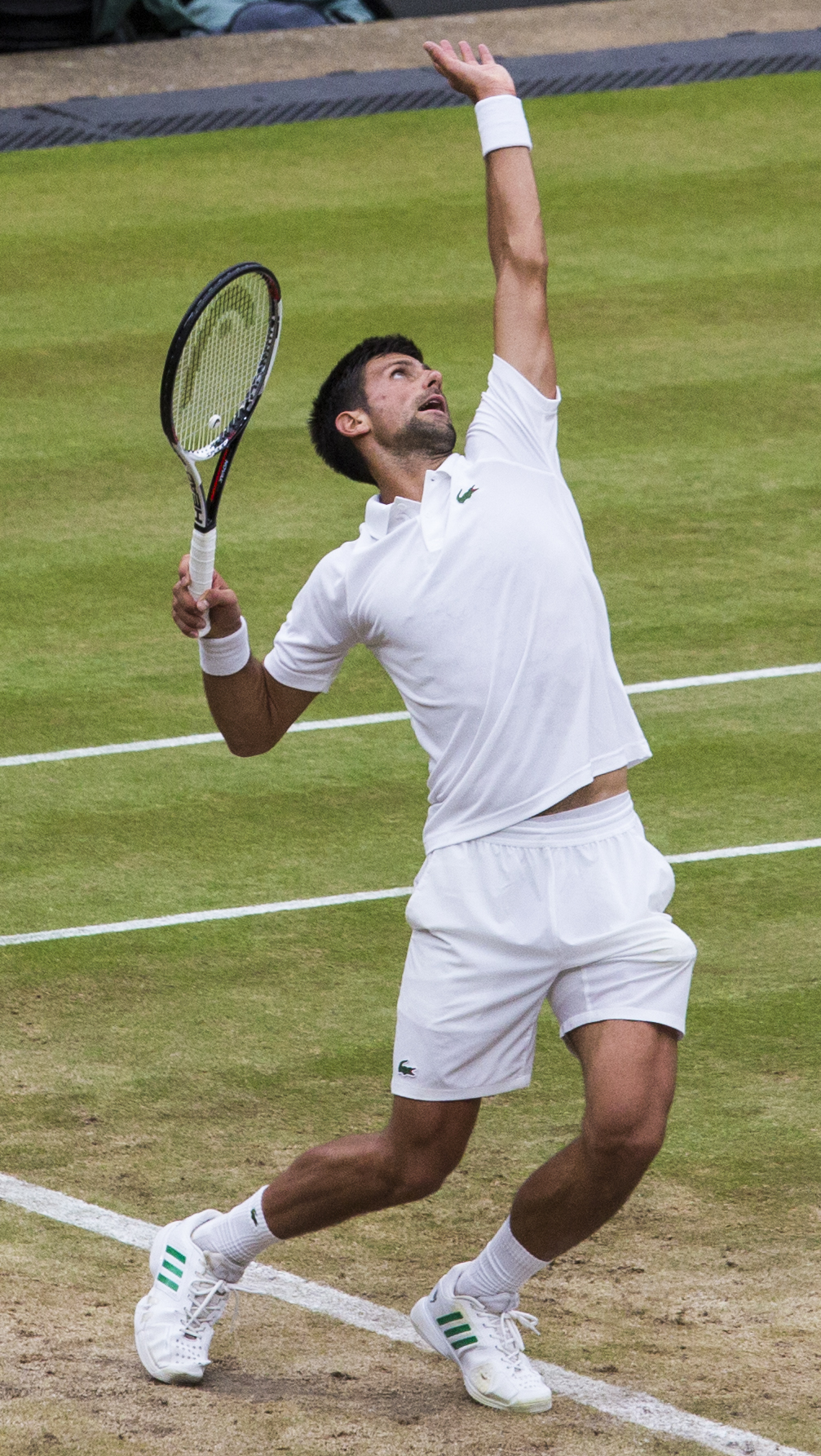
Roger Federer won a record-equaling sixth Australian Open and record-extending 20th major overall, defeating Marin Čilić in the final. Rafael Nadal defeated Dominic Thiem to win a record-extending 11th French Open and 17th major title overall. Novak Djokovic defeated Kevin Anderson to win his fourth Wimbledon title and 13th major title overall. Djokovic then defeated Juan Martín del Potro to win a third US Open and 14th major title overall.

The 2018 ATP World Tour was the global elite men's professional tennis circuit organised by the Association of Tennis Professionals (ATP) for the 2018 tennis season. The 2018 ATP World Tour calendar comprised the Grand Slam tournaments (supervised by the International Tennis Federation (ITF)), the ATP World Tour Masters 1000, the ATP Finals, the ATP World Tour 500 series, the ATP World Tour 250 series and the Davis Cup (organized by the ITF). Also included in the 2018 calendar are the Hopman Cup and the Next Gen ATP Finals, which do not distribute ranking points.

== Schedule ==
This is the complete schedule of events on the 2018 calendar.

Key
Grand Slam
ATP Finals
ATP World Tour Masters 1000
ATP World Tour 500
ATP World Tour 250
Team Events

=== January ===
Week	Tournament	Champions	Runners-up	Semifinalists	Quarterfinalists
1 Jan	Hopman Cup; Perth, Australia; ITF Mixed Team Championships; Hard (i) – 8 teams (RR)	Switzerland; 2–1	Germany	Round robin (Group A) Belgium; Australia; Canada	Round robin (Group B) United States; Russia; Japan
1 Jan	Qatar Open; Doha, Qatar; ATP World Tour 250; Hard – $1,386,665 – 32S/16Q/16D; Singles – Doubles	(France) Gaël Monfils; 6–2, 6–3	(Russia) Andrey Rublev	(Austria) Dominic Thiem (Argentina) Guido Pella	(Greece) Stefanos Tsitsipas (Germany) Peter Gojowczyk (Bosnia and Herzegovina) Mirza Bašić (Croatia) Borna Ćorić
1 Jan	Qatar Open; Doha, Qatar; ATP World Tour 250; Hard – $1,386,665 – 32S/16Q/16D; Singles – Doubles	(Austria) Oliver Marach (Croatia) Mate Pavić; 6–2, 7–6^{(8–6)}	(United Kingdom) Jamie Murray (Brazil) Bruno Soares	(Austria) Dominic Thiem (Argentina) Guido Pella	(Greece) Stefanos Tsitsipas (Germany) Peter Gojowczyk (Bosnia and Herzegovina) Mirza Bašić (Croatia) Borna Ćorić
1 Jan	Maharashtra Open; Pune, India; ATP World Tour 250; Hard – $561,345 – 28S/16Q/16D; Singles – Doubles	(France) Gilles Simon; 7–6^{(7–4)}, 6–2	(South Africa) Kevin Anderson	(Croatia) Marin Čilić (France) Benoît Paire	(France) Pierre-Hugues Herbert (Spain) Ricardo Ojeda Lara (Netherlands) Robin Haase (Kazakhstan) Mikhail Kukushkin
1 Jan	Maharashtra Open; Pune, India; ATP World Tour 250; Hard – $561,345 – 28S/16Q/16D; Singles – Doubles	(Netherlands) Robin Haase (Netherlands) Matwé Middelkoop; 7–6^{(7–5)}, 7–6^{(7–5)}	(France) Pierre-Hugues Herbert (France) Gilles Simon	(Croatia) Marin Čilić (France) Benoît Paire	(France) Pierre-Hugues Herbert (Spain) Ricardo Ojeda Lara (Netherlands) Robin Haase (Kazakhstan) Mikhail Kukushkin
1 Jan	Brisbane International; Brisbane, Australia; ATP World Tour 250; Hard – $528,910 – 28S/16Q/16D; Singles – Doubles	(Australia) Nick Kyrgios; 6–4, 6–2	(United States) Ryan Harrison	(Bulgaria) Grigor Dimitrov (Australia) Alex de Minaur	(United Kingdom) Kyle Edmund (Ukraine) Alexandr Dolgopolov (United States) Michael Mmoh (Uzbekistan) Denis Istomin
1 Jan	Brisbane International; Brisbane, Australia; ATP World Tour 250; Hard – $528,910 – 28S/16Q/16D; Singles – Doubles	(Finland) Henri Kontinen (Australia) John Peers; 3–6, 6–3, [10–2]	(Argentina) Leonardo Mayer (Argentina) Horacio Zeballos	(Bulgaria) Grigor Dimitrov (Australia) Alex de Minaur	(United Kingdom) Kyle Edmund (Ukraine) Alexandr Dolgopolov (United States) Michael Mmoh (Uzbekistan) Denis Istomin
8 Jan	Auckland Open; Auckland, New Zealand; ATP World Tour 250; Hard – $561,345 – 28S/16Q/16D; Singles – Doubles	(Spain) Roberto Bautista Agut; 6–1, 4–6, 7–5	(Argentina) Juan Martín del Potro	(Netherlands) Robin Haase (Spain) David Ferrer	(Germany) Peter Gojowczyk (Czech Republic) Jiří Veselý (South Korea) Chung Hyeon (Russia) Karen Khachanov
8 Jan	Auckland Open; Auckland, New Zealand; ATP World Tour 250; Hard – $561,345 – 28S/16Q/16D; Singles – Doubles	(Austria) Oliver Marach (Croatia) Mate Pavić; 6–4, 5–7, [10–7]	(Belarus) Max Mirnyi (Austria) Philipp Oswald	(Netherlands) Robin Haase (Spain) David Ferrer	(Germany) Peter Gojowczyk (Czech Republic) Jiří Veselý (South Korea) Chung Hyeon (Russia) Karen Khachanov
8 Jan	Sydney International; Sydney, Australia; ATP World Tour 250; Hard – $528,910 – 28S/16Q/16D; Singles – Doubles	(Russia) Daniil Medvedev; 1–6, 6–4, 7–5	(Australia) Alex de Minaur	(Italy) Fabio Fognini (France) Benoît Paire	(Italy) Paolo Lorenzi (France) Adrian Mannarino (Spain) Feliciano López (Luxembourg) Gilles Müller
8 Jan	Sydney International; Sydney, Australia; ATP World Tour 250; Hard – $528,910 – 28S/16Q/16D; Singles – Doubles	(Poland) Łukasz Kubot (Brazil) Marcelo Melo; 6–3, 6–4	(Germany) Jan-Lennard Struff (Serbia) Viktor Troicki	(Italy) Fabio Fognini (France) Benoît Paire	(Italy) Paolo Lorenzi (France) Adrian Mannarino (Spain) Feliciano López (Luxembourg) Gilles Müller
15 Jan; 22 Jan	Australian Open; Melbourne, Australia; Grand Slam; Hard – A$24,903,000; 128S/128Q/64D/32X; Singles – Doubles – Mixed doubles	(Switzerland) Roger Federer; 6–2, 6–7^{(5–7)}, 6–3, 3–6, 6–1	(Croatia) Marin Čilić	(United Kingdom) Kyle Edmund (South Korea) Chung Hyeon	(Spain) Rafael Nadal (Bulgaria) Grigor Dimitrov (United States) Tennys Sandgren (Czech Republic) Tomáš Berdych
15 Jan; 22 Jan	Australian Open; Melbourne, Australia; Grand Slam; Hard – A$24,903,000; 128S/128Q/64D/32X; Singles – Doubles – Mixed doubles	(Austria) Oliver Marach (Croatia) Mate Pavić; 6–4, 6–4	(Colombia) Juan Sebastián Cabal (Colombia) Robert Farah	(United Kingdom) Kyle Edmund (South Korea) Chung Hyeon	(Spain) Rafael Nadal (Bulgaria) Grigor Dimitrov (United States) Tennys Sandgren (Czech Republic) Tomáš Berdych
15 Jan; 22 Jan	Australian Open; Melbourne, Australia; Grand Slam; Hard – A$24,903,000; 128S/128Q/64D/32X; Singles – Doubles – Mixed doubles	(Canada) Gabriela Dabrowski (Croatia) Mate Pavić; 2–6, 6–4, [11–9]	(Hungary) Tímea Babos (India) Rohan Bopanna	(United Kingdom) Kyle Edmund (South Korea) Chung Hyeon	(Spain) Rafael Nadal (Bulgaria) Grigor Dimitrov (United States) Tennys Sandgren (Czech Republic) Tomáš Berdych
29 Jan	Davis Cup first round Albertville, France – hard (i); Morioka, Japan – hard (i); Marbella, Spain – clay Brisbane, Australia – hard Astana, Kazakhstan – hard (i); Osijek, Croatia – clay (i); Niš, Serbia – clay (i); Liège, Belgium – hard (i)	First-round winners France 3–1; Italy 3–1; Spain 3–1; Germany 3–1; Kazakhstan 4–1; Croatia 3–1; United States 3–1; Belgium 3–2	First-round losers Netherlands; Japan; Great Britain; Australia; Switzerland; Canada; Serbia; Hungary		

=== February ===
Week	Tournament	Champions	Runners-up	Semifinalists	Quarterfinalists
5 Feb	Open Sud de France; Montpellier, France; ATP World Tour 250; Hard (i) – €561,345 – 28S/16Q/16D; Singles – Doubles	(France) Lucas Pouille; 7–6^{(7–2)}, 6–4	(France) Richard Gasquet	(Belgium) David Goffin (France) Jo-Wilfried Tsonga	(Russia) Karen Khachanov (Bosnia and Herzegovina) Damir Džumhur (Russia) Andrey Rublev (France) Benoît Paire
5 Feb	Open Sud de France; Montpellier, France; ATP World Tour 250; Hard (i) – €561,345 – 28S/16Q/16D; Singles – Doubles	(United Kingdom) Ken Skupski (United Kingdom) Neal Skupski; 7–6^{(7–2)}, 6–4	(Japan) Ben McLachlan (France) Hugo Nys	(Belgium) David Goffin (France) Jo-Wilfried Tsonga	(Russia) Karen Khachanov (Bosnia and Herzegovina) Damir Džumhur (Russia) Andrey Rublev (France) Benoît Paire
5 Feb	Sofia Open; Sofia, Bulgaria; ATP World Tour 250; Hard (i) – €561,345 – 28S/16Q/16D; Singles – Doubles	(Bosnia and Herzegovina) Mirza Bašić; 7–6^{(8–6)}, 6–7^{(4–7)}, 6–4	(Romania) Marius Copil	(Switzerland) Stan Wawrinka (Slovakia) Jozef Kovalík	(Serbia) Viktor Troicki (Germany) Maximilian Marterer (Luxembourg) Gilles Müller (Cyprus) Marcos Baghdatis
5 Feb	Sofia Open; Sofia, Bulgaria; ATP World Tour 250; Hard (i) – €561,345 – 28S/16Q/16D; Singles – Doubles	(Netherlands) Robin Haase (Netherlands) Matwé Middelkoop; 5–7, 6–4, [10–4]	(Croatia) Nikola Mektić (Austria) Alexander Peya	(Switzerland) Stan Wawrinka (Slovakia) Jozef Kovalík	(Serbia) Viktor Troicki (Germany) Maximilian Marterer (Luxembourg) Gilles Müller (Cyprus) Marcos Baghdatis
5 Feb	Ecuador Open; Quito, Ecuador; ATP World Tour 250; Clay (red) – $561,345 – 28S/16Q/16D; Singles – Doubles	(Spain) Roberto Carballés Baena; 6–3, 4–6, 6–4	(Spain) Albert Ramos Viñolas	(Slovakia) Andrej Martin (Brazil) Thiago Monteiro	(France) Corentin Moutet (Chile) Nicolás Jarry (France) Gaël Monfils (Austria) Gerald Melzer
5 Feb	Ecuador Open; Quito, Ecuador; ATP World Tour 250; Clay (red) – $561,345 – 28S/16Q/16D; Singles – Doubles	(Chile) Nicolás Jarry (Chile) Hans Podlipnik Castillo; 7–6^{(8–6)}, 6–3	(United States) Austin Krajicek (United States) Jackson Withrow	(Slovakia) Andrej Martin (Brazil) Thiago Monteiro	(France) Corentin Moutet (Chile) Nicolás Jarry (France) Gaël Monfils (Austria) Gerald Melzer
12 Feb	Rotterdam Open; Rotterdam, Netherlands; ATP World Tour 500; Hard (i) – €1,996,245 – 32S/16Q/16D/4Q; Singles – Doubles	(Switzerland) Roger Federer; 6–2, 6–2	(Bulgaria) Grigor Dimitrov	(Italy) Andreas Seppi (Belgium) David Goffin	(Netherlands) Robin Haase (Russia) Daniil Medvedev (Czech Republic) Tomáš Berdych (Russia) Andrey Rublev
12 Feb	Rotterdam Open; Rotterdam, Netherlands; ATP World Tour 500; Hard (i) – €1,996,245 – 32S/16Q/16D/4Q; Singles – Doubles	(France) Pierre-Hugues Herbert (France) Nicolas Mahut; 2–6, 6–2, [10–7]	(Austria) Oliver Marach (Croatia) Mate Pavić	(Italy) Andreas Seppi (Belgium) David Goffin	(Netherlands) Robin Haase (Russia) Daniil Medvedev (Czech Republic) Tomáš Berdych (Russia) Andrey Rublev
12 Feb	New York Open; Uniondale, United States; ATP World Tour 250; Hard (i) – $748,450 – 28S/16Q/16D; Singles – Doubles	(South Africa) Kevin Anderson; 4–6, 6–3, 7–6^{(7–1)}	(United States) Sam Querrey	(Japan) Kei Nishikori (France) Adrian Mannarino	(United States) Frances Tiafoe (Moldova) Radu Albot (Spain) Adrián Menéndez Maceiras (Croatia) Ivo Karlović
12 Feb	New York Open; Uniondale, United States; ATP World Tour 250; Hard (i) – $748,450 – 28S/16Q/16D; Singles – Doubles	(Belarus) Max Mirnyi (Austria) Philipp Oswald; 6–4, 4–6, [10–6]	(Netherlands) Wesley Koolhof (New Zealand) Artem Sitak	(Japan) Kei Nishikori (France) Adrian Mannarino	(United States) Frances Tiafoe (Moldova) Radu Albot (Spain) Adrián Menéndez Maceiras (Croatia) Ivo Karlović
12 Feb	Argentina Open; Buenos Aires, Argentina; ATP World Tour 250; Clay (red) – $648,180 – 28S/16Q/16D; Singles – Doubles	(Austria) Dominic Thiem; 6–2, 6–4	(Slovenia) Aljaž Bedene	(France) Gaël Monfils (Argentina) Federico Delbonis	(Argentina) Guido Pella (Argentina) Leonardo Mayer (Argentina) Diego Schwartzman (Spain) Guillermo García López
12 Feb	Argentina Open; Buenos Aires, Argentina; ATP World Tour 250; Clay (red) – $648,180 – 28S/16Q/16D; Singles – Doubles	(Argentina) Andrés Molteni (Argentina) Horacio Zeballos; 6–3, 5–7, [10–3]	(Colombia) Juan Sebastián Cabal (Colombia) Robert Farah	(France) Gaël Monfils (Argentina) Federico Delbonis	(Argentina) Guido Pella (Argentina) Leonardo Mayer (Argentina) Diego Schwartzman (Spain) Guillermo García López
19 Feb	Rio Open; Rio de Janeiro, Brazil; ATP World Tour 500; Clay (red) – $1,842,475 – 32S/16Q/16D/4Q; Singles – Doubles	(Argentina) Diego Schwartzman; 6–2, 6–3	(Spain) Fernando Verdasco	(Chile) Nicolás Jarry (Italy) Fabio Fognini	(France) Gaël Monfils (Uruguay) Pablo Cuevas (Slovenia) Aljaž Bedene (Austria) Dominic Thiem
19 Feb	Rio Open; Rio de Janeiro, Brazil; ATP World Tour 500; Clay (red) – $1,842,475 – 32S/16Q/16D/4Q; Singles – Doubles	(Spain) David Marrero (Spain) Fernando Verdasco; 5–7, 7–5, [10–8]	(Croatia) Nikola Mektić (Austria) Alexander Peya	(Chile) Nicolás Jarry (Italy) Fabio Fognini	(France) Gaël Monfils (Uruguay) Pablo Cuevas (Slovenia) Aljaž Bedene (Austria) Dominic Thiem
19 Feb	Open 13; Marseille, France; ATP World Tour 250; Hard (i) – €718,810 – 28S/16Q/16D; Singles – Doubles	(Russia) Karen Khachanov; 7–5, 3–6, 7–5	(France) Lucas Pouille	(Czech Republic) Tomáš Berdych (Belarus) Ilya Ivashka	(France) Julien Benneteau (Bosnia and Herzegovina) Damir Džumhur (Serbia) Filip Krajinović (France) Nicolas Mahut
19 Feb	Open 13; Marseille, France; ATP World Tour 250; Hard (i) – €718,810 – 28S/16Q/16D; Singles – Doubles	(South Africa) Raven Klaasen (New Zealand) Michael Venus; 6–7^{(2–7)}, 6–3, [10–4]	(New Zealand) Marcus Daniell (United Kingdom) Dominic Inglot	(Czech Republic) Tomáš Berdych (Belarus) Ilya Ivashka	(France) Julien Benneteau (Bosnia and Herzegovina) Damir Džumhur (Serbia) Filip Krajinović (France) Nicolas Mahut
19 Feb	Delray Beach Open; Delray Beach, United States; ATP World Tour 250; Hard – $622,675 – 32S/16Q/16D; Singles – Doubles	(United States) Frances Tiafoe; 6–1, 6–4	(Germany) Peter Gojowczyk	(United States) Steve Johnson (Canada) Denis Shapovalov	(United States) Reilly Opelka (Russia) Evgeny Donskoy (United States) Taylor Fritz (South Korea) Chung Hyeon
19 Feb	Delray Beach Open; Delray Beach, United States; ATP World Tour 250; Hard – $622,675 – 32S/16Q/16D; Singles – Doubles	(United States) Jack Sock (United States) Jackson Withrow; 4–6, 6–4, [10–8]	(United States) Nicholas Monroe (Australia) John-Patrick Smith	(United States) Steve Johnson (Canada) Denis Shapovalov	(United States) Reilly Opelka (Russia) Evgeny Donskoy (United States) Taylor Fritz (South Korea) Chung Hyeon
26 Feb	Dubai Tennis Championships; Dubai, United Arab Emirates; ATP World Tour 500; Hard – $3,057,135 – 32S/16Q/16D/4Q; Singles – Doubles	(Spain) Roberto Bautista Agut; 6–3, 6–4	(France) Lucas Pouille	(Tunisia) Malek Jaziri (Serbia) Filip Krajinović	(Greece) Stefanos Tsitsipas (Croatia) Borna Ćorić (Russia) Evgeny Donskoy (Japan) Yūichi Sugita
26 Feb	Dubai Tennis Championships; Dubai, United Arab Emirates; ATP World Tour 500; Hard – $3,057,135 – 32S/16Q/16D/4Q; Singles – Doubles	(Netherlands) Jean-Julien Rojer (Romania) Horia Tecău; 6–2, 7–6^{(7–2)}	(United States) James Cerretani (India) Leander Paes	(Tunisia) Malek Jaziri (Serbia) Filip Krajinović	(Greece) Stefanos Tsitsipas (Croatia) Borna Ćorić (Russia) Evgeny Donskoy (Japan) Yūichi Sugita
26 Feb	Mexican Open; Acapulco, Mexico; ATP World Tour 500; Hard – $1,789,445 – 32S/16Q/16D/4Q; Singles – Doubles	(Argentina) Juan Martín del Potro; 6–4, 6–4	(South Africa) Kevin Anderson	(United States) Jared Donaldson (Germany) Alexander Zverev	(Spain) Feliciano López (South Korea) Chung Hyeon (Austria) Dominic Thiem (United States) Ryan Harrison
26 Feb	Mexican Open; Acapulco, Mexico; ATP World Tour 500; Hard – $1,789,445 – 32S/16Q/16D/4Q; Singles – Doubles	(United Kingdom) Jamie Murray (Brazil) Bruno Soares; 7–6^{(7–4)}, 7–5	(United States) Bob Bryan (United States) Mike Bryan	(United States) Jared Donaldson (Germany) Alexander Zverev	(Spain) Feliciano López (South Korea) Chung Hyeon (Austria) Dominic Thiem (United States) Ryan Harrison
26 Feb	Brasil Open; São Paulo, Brazil; ATP World Tour 250; Clay (red) (i) – $582,870 – 28S/16Q/16D; Singles – Doubles	(Italy) Fabio Fognini; 1–6, 6–1, 6–4	(Chile) Nicolás Jarry	(Argentina) Horacio Zeballos (Uruguay) Pablo Cuevas	(Spain) Albert Ramos Viñolas (Brazil) Rogério Dutra Silva (Argentina) Leonardo Mayer (Spain) Guillermo García López
26 Feb	Brasil Open; São Paulo, Brazil; ATP World Tour 250; Clay (red) (i) – $582,870 – 28S/16Q/16D; Singles – Doubles	(Argentina) Federico Delbonis (Argentina) Máximo González; 6–4, 6–2	(Netherlands) Wesley Koolhof (New Zealand) Artem Sitak	(Argentina) Horacio Zeballos (Uruguay) Pablo Cuevas	(Spain) Albert Ramos Viñolas (Brazil) Rogério Dutra Silva (Argentina) Leonardo Mayer (Spain) Guillermo García López

=== March ===
Week	Tournament	Champions	Runners-up	Semifinalists	Quarterfinalists
5 Mar; 12 Mar	Indian Wells Masters; Indian Wells, United States; ATP World Tour Masters 1000; Hard – $7,972,535 – 96S/48Q/32D; Singles – Doubles	(Argentina) Juan Martín del Potro; 6–4, 6–7^{(8–10)}, 7–6^{(7–2)}	(Switzerland) Roger Federer	(Croatia) Borna Ćorić (Canada) Milos Raonic	(South Korea) Chung Hyeon (South Africa) Kevin Anderson (United States) Sam Querrey (Germany) Philipp Kohlschreiber
5 Mar; 12 Mar	Indian Wells Masters; Indian Wells, United States; ATP World Tour Masters 1000; Hard – $7,972,535 – 96S/48Q/32D; Singles – Doubles	(United States) John Isner (United States) Jack Sock; 7–6^{(7–4)}, 7–6^{(7–2)}	(United States) Bob Bryan (United States) Mike Bryan	(Croatia) Borna Ćorić (Canada) Milos Raonic	(South Korea) Chung Hyeon (South Africa) Kevin Anderson (United States) Sam Querrey (Germany) Philipp Kohlschreiber
19 Mar; 26 Mar	Miami Open; Key Biscayne, United States; ATP World Tour Masters 1000; Hard – $7,972,535 – 96S/48Q/32D; Singles – Doubles	(United States) John Isner; 6–7^{(4–7)}, 6–4, 6–4	(Germany) Alexander Zverev	(Spain) Pablo Carreño Busta (Argentina) Juan Martín del Potro	(South Africa) Kevin Anderson (Croatia) Borna Ćorić (Canada) Milos Raonic (South Korea) Chung Hyeon
19 Mar; 26 Mar	Miami Open; Key Biscayne, United States; ATP World Tour Masters 1000; Hard – $7,972,535 – 96S/48Q/32D; Singles – Doubles	(United States) Bob Bryan (United States) Mike Bryan; 4–6, 7–6^{(7–5)}, [10–4]	(Russia) Karen Khachanov (Russia) Andrey Rublev	(Spain) Pablo Carreño Busta (Argentina) Juan Martín del Potro	(South Africa) Kevin Anderson (Croatia) Borna Ćorić (Canada) Milos Raonic (South Korea) Chung Hyeon

=== April ===
Week	Tournament	Champions	Runners-up	Semifinalists	Quarterfinalists
2 Apr	Davis Cup Quarterfinals; Genoa, Italy – clay Valencia, Spain – clay Varaždin, Croatia – clay (i); Nashville, United States – hard (i)	Quarterfinals winners France 3–1; Spain 3–2; Croatia 3–1; United States 4–0	Quarterfinals losers Italy; Germany; Kazakhstan; Belgium		
9 Apr	U.S. Men's Clay Court Championships; Houston, United States; ATP World Tour 250; Clay (red) – $623,710 – 28S/16Q/16D; Singles – Doubles	(United States) Steve Johnson; 7–6^{(7–2)}, 2–6, 6–4	(United States) Tennys Sandgren	(United States) Taylor Fritz (Croatia) Ivo Karlović	(United States) John Isner (United States) Jack Sock (Australia) Nick Kyrgios (Argentina) Guido Pella
9 Apr	U.S. Men's Clay Court Championships; Houston, United States; ATP World Tour 250; Clay (red) – $623,710 – 28S/16Q/16D; Singles – Doubles	(Belarus) Max Mirnyi (Austria) Philipp Oswald; 6–7^{(2–7)}, 6–4, [11–9]	(Germany) Andre Begemann (Croatia) Antonio Šančić	(United States) Taylor Fritz (Croatia) Ivo Karlović	(United States) John Isner (United States) Jack Sock (Australia) Nick Kyrgios (Argentina) Guido Pella
9 Apr	Grand Prix Hassan II; Marrakesh, Morocco; ATP World Tour 250; Clay (red) – €561,345 – 32S/16Q/16D; Singles – Doubles	(Spain) Pablo Andújar; 6–2, 6–2	(United Kingdom) Kyle Edmund	(Portugal) João Sousa (France) Richard Gasquet	(Russia) Alexey Vatutin (Georgia (country)) Nikoloz Basilashvili (France) Gilles Simon (Tunisia) Malek Jaziri
9 Apr	Grand Prix Hassan II; Marrakesh, Morocco; ATP World Tour 250; Clay (red) – €561,345 – 32S/16Q/16D; Singles – Doubles	(Croatia) Nikola Mektić (Austria) Alexander Peya; 7–5, 3–6, [10–7]	(France) Benoît Paire (France) Édouard Roger-Vasselin	(Portugal) João Sousa (France) Richard Gasquet	(Russia) Alexey Vatutin (Georgia (country)) Nikoloz Basilashvili (France) Gilles Simon (Tunisia) Malek Jaziri
16 Apr	Monte-Carlo Masters; Roquebrune-Cap-Martin, France; ATP World Tour Masters 1000; Clay (red) – €4,872,105 – 56S/28Q/24D; Singles – Doubles	(Spain) Rafael Nadal; 6–3, 6–2	(Japan) Kei Nishikori	(Bulgaria) Grigor Dimitrov (Germany) Alexander Zverev	(Austria) Dominic Thiem (Belgium) David Goffin (France) Richard Gasquet (Croatia) Marin Čilić
16 Apr	Monte-Carlo Masters; Roquebrune-Cap-Martin, France; ATP World Tour Masters 1000; Clay (red) – €4,872,105 – 56S/28Q/24D; Singles – Doubles	(United States) Bob Bryan (United States) Mike Bryan; 7–6^{(7–5)}, 6–3	(Austria) Oliver Marach (Croatia) Mate Pavić	(Bulgaria) Grigor Dimitrov (Germany) Alexander Zverev	(Austria) Dominic Thiem (Belgium) David Goffin (France) Richard Gasquet (Croatia) Marin Čilić
23 Apr	Barcelona Open; Barcelona, Spain; ATP World Tour 500; Clay (red) – €2,794,220 – 48S/24Q/16D/4Q; Singles – Doubles	(Spain) Rafael Nadal; 6–2, 6–1	(Greece) Stefanos Tsitsipas	(Belgium) David Goffin (Spain) Pablo Carreño Busta	(Slovakia) Martin Kližan (Spain) Roberto Bautista Agut (Austria) Dominic Thiem (Bulgaria) Grigor Dimitrov
23 Apr	Barcelona Open; Barcelona, Spain; ATP World Tour 500; Clay (red) – €2,794,220 – 48S/24Q/16D/4Q; Singles – Doubles	(Spain) Feliciano López (Spain) Marc López; 7–6^{(7–5)}, 6–4	(Pakistan) Aisam-ul-Haq Qureshi (Netherlands) Jean-Julien Rojer	(Belgium) David Goffin (Spain) Pablo Carreño Busta	(Slovakia) Martin Kližan (Spain) Roberto Bautista Agut (Austria) Dominic Thiem (Bulgaria) Grigor Dimitrov
23 Apr	Hungarian Open; Budapest, Hungary; ATP World Tour 250; Clay (red) – €561,345 – 28S/16Q/16D; Singles – Doubles	(Italy) Marco Cecchinato; 7–5, 6–4	(Australia) John Millman	(Slovenia) Aljaž Bedene (Italy) Andreas Seppi	(Germany) Yannick Maden (Italy) Lorenzo Sonego (Georgia (country)) Nikoloz Basilashvili (Germany) Jan-Lennard Struff
23 Apr	Hungarian Open; Budapest, Hungary; ATP World Tour 250; Clay (red) – €561,345 – 28S/16Q/16D; Singles – Doubles	(United Kingdom) Dominic Inglot (Croatia) Franko Škugor; 6–7^{(8–10)}, 6–1, [10–8]	(Netherlands) Matwé Middelkoop (Argentina) Andrés Molteni	(Slovenia) Aljaž Bedene (Italy) Andreas Seppi	(Germany) Yannick Maden (Italy) Lorenzo Sonego (Georgia (country)) Nikoloz Basilashvili (Germany) Jan-Lennard Struff
30 Apr	Estoril Open; Cascais, Portugal; ATP World Tour 250; Clay (red) – €561,345 – 28S/16Q/16D; Singles – Doubles	(Portugal) João Sousa; 6–4, 6–4	(United States) Frances Tiafoe	(Greece) Stefanos Tsitsipas (Spain) Pablo Carreño Busta	(Spain) Roberto Carballés Baena (United Kingdom) Kyle Edmund (Italy) Simone Bolelli (Chile) Nicolás Jarry
30 Apr	Estoril Open; Cascais, Portugal; ATP World Tour 250; Clay (red) – €561,345 – 28S/16Q/16D; Singles – Doubles	(United Kingdom) Kyle Edmund (United Kingdom) Cameron Norrie; 6–4, 6–2	(Netherlands) Wesley Koolhof (New Zealand) Artem Sitak	(Greece) Stefanos Tsitsipas (Spain) Pablo Carreño Busta	(Spain) Roberto Carballés Baena (United Kingdom) Kyle Edmund (Italy) Simone Bolelli (Chile) Nicolás Jarry
30 Apr	Bavarian International Tennis Championships; Munich, Germany; ATP World Tour 250; Clay (red) – €561,345 – 28S/16Q/16D; Singles – Doubles	(Germany) Alexander Zverev; 6–3, 6–3	(Germany) Philipp Kohlschreiber	(South Korea) Chung Hyeon (Germany) Maximilian Marterer	(Germany) Jan-Lennard Struff (Slovakia) Martin Kližan (Hungary) Márton Fucsovics (Spain) Roberto Bautista Agut
30 Apr	Bavarian International Tennis Championships; Munich, Germany; ATP World Tour 250; Clay (red) – €561,345 – 28S/16Q/16D; Singles – Doubles	(Croatia) Ivan Dodig (United States) Rajeev Ram; 6–3, 7–5	(Croatia) Nikola Mektić (Austria) Alexander Peya	(South Korea) Chung Hyeon (Germany) Maximilian Marterer	(Germany) Jan-Lennard Struff (Slovakia) Martin Kližan (Hungary) Márton Fucsovics (Spain) Roberto Bautista Agut
30 Apr	Istanbul Open; Istanbul, Turkey; ATP World Tour 250; Clay (red) – €486,145 – 28S/16Q/16D; Singles – Doubles	(Japan) Taro Daniel; 7–6^{(7–4)}, 6–4	(Tunisia) Malek Jaziri	(Serbia) Laslo Đere (France) Jérémy Chardy	(Czech Republic) Jiří Veselý (Italy) Paolo Lorenzi (Brazil) Rogério Dutra Silva (Italy) Thomas Fabbiano
30 Apr	Istanbul Open; Istanbul, Turkey; ATP World Tour 250; Clay (red) – €486,145 – 28S/16Q/16D; Singles – Doubles	(United Kingdom) Dominic Inglot (Sweden) Robert Lindstedt; 3–6, 6–3, [10–8]	(Japan) Ben McLachlan (United States) Nicholas Monroe	(Serbia) Laslo Đere (France) Jérémy Chardy	(Czech Republic) Jiří Veselý (Italy) Paolo Lorenzi (Brazil) Rogério Dutra Silva (Italy) Thomas Fabbiano

=== May ===
Week	Tournament	Champions	Runners-up	Semifinalists	Quarterfinalists
7 May	Madrid Open; Madrid, Spain; ATP World Tour Masters 1000; Clay (red) – €7,190,930 – 56S/28Q/24D; Singles – Doubles	(Germany) Alexander Zverev; 6–4, 6–4	(Austria) Dominic Thiem	(South Africa) Kevin Anderson (Canada) Denis Shapovalov	(Spain) Rafael Nadal (Serbia) Dušan Lajović (United Kingdom) Kyle Edmund (United States) John Isner
7 May	Madrid Open; Madrid, Spain; ATP World Tour Masters 1000; Clay (red) – €7,190,930 – 56S/28Q/24D; Singles – Doubles	(Croatia) Nikola Mektić (Austria) Alexander Peya; 5–3 ret.	(United States) Bob Bryan (United States) Mike Bryan	(South Africa) Kevin Anderson (Canada) Denis Shapovalov	(Spain) Rafael Nadal (Serbia) Dušan Lajović (United Kingdom) Kyle Edmund (United States) John Isner
14 May	Italian Open; Rome, Italy; ATP World Tour Masters 1000; Clay (red) – €5,444,985 – 56S/28Q/24D; Singles – Doubles	(Spain) Rafael Nadal; 6–1, 1–6, 6–3	(Germany) Alexander Zverev	(Serbia) Novak Djokovic (Croatia) Marin Čilić	(Italy) Fabio Fognini (Japan) Kei Nishikori (Spain) Pablo Carreño Busta (Belgium) David Goffin
14 May	Italian Open; Rome, Italy; ATP World Tour Masters 1000; Clay (red) – €5,444,985 – 56S/28Q/24D; Singles – Doubles	(Colombia) Juan Sebastián Cabal (Colombia) Robert Farah; 3–6, 6–4, [10–4]	(Spain) Pablo Carreño Busta (Portugal) João Sousa	(Serbia) Novak Djokovic (Croatia) Marin Čilić	(Italy) Fabio Fognini (Japan) Kei Nishikori (Spain) Pablo Carreño Busta (Belgium) David Goffin
21 May	Geneva Open; Geneva, Switzerland; ATP World Tour 250; Clay (red) – €561,345 – 28S/16Q/16D; Singles – Doubles	(Hungary) Márton Fucsovics; 6–2, 6–2	(Germany) Peter Gojowczyk	(United States) Steve Johnson (Italy) Fabio Fognini	(Argentina) Guido Pella (Switzerland) Stan Wawrinka (Italy) Andreas Seppi (United States) Tennys Sandgren
21 May	Geneva Open; Geneva, Switzerland; ATP World Tour 250; Clay (red) – €561,345 – 28S/16Q/16D; Singles – Doubles	(Austria) Oliver Marach (Croatia) Mate Pavić; 3–6, 7–6^{(7–3)}, [11–9]	(Croatia) Ivan Dodig (United States) Rajeev Ram	(United States) Steve Johnson (Italy) Fabio Fognini	(Argentina) Guido Pella (Switzerland) Stan Wawrinka (Italy) Andreas Seppi (United States) Tennys Sandgren
21 May	Lyon Open; Lyon, France; ATP World Tour 250; Clay (red) – €561,345 – 28S/16Q/16D; Singles – Doubles	(Austria) Dominic Thiem; 3–6, 7–6^{(7–2)}, 6–1	(France) Gilles Simon	(Serbia) Dušan Lajović (United Kingdom) Cameron Norrie	(Spain) Guillermo García López (United States) Taylor Fritz (Kazakhstan) Mikhail Kukushkin (United States) John Isner
21 May	Lyon Open; Lyon, France; ATP World Tour 250; Clay (red) – €561,345 – 28S/16Q/16D; Singles – Doubles	(Australia) Nick Kyrgios (United States) Jack Sock; 7–5, 2–6, [11–9]	(Czech Republic) Roman Jebavý (Netherlands) Matwé Middelkoop	(Serbia) Dušan Lajović (United Kingdom) Cameron Norrie	(Spain) Guillermo García López (United States) Taylor Fritz (Kazakhstan) Mikhail Kukushkin (United States) John Isner
28 May; 4 Jun	French Open; Paris, France; Grand Slam; Clay (red) – €18,414,000; 128S/128Q/64D/32X; Singles – Doubles – Mixed doubles	(Spain) Rafael Nadal; 6–4, 6–3, 6–2	(Austria) Dominic Thiem	(Argentina) Juan Martín del Potro (Italy) Marco Cecchinato	(Argentina) Diego Schwartzman (Croatia) Marin Čilić (Serbia) Novak Djokovic (Germany) Alexander Zverev
28 May; 4 Jun	French Open; Paris, France; Grand Slam; Clay (red) – €18,414,000; 128S/128Q/64D/32X; Singles – Doubles – Mixed doubles	(France) Pierre-Hugues Herbert (France) Nicolas Mahut; 6–2, 7–6^{(7–4)}	(Austria) Oliver Marach (Croatia) Mate Pavić	(Argentina) Juan Martín del Potro (Italy) Marco Cecchinato	(Argentina) Diego Schwartzman (Croatia) Marin Čilić (Serbia) Novak Djokovic (Germany) Alexander Zverev
28 May; 4 Jun	French Open; Paris, France; Grand Slam; Clay (red) – €18,414,000; 128S/128Q/64D/32X; Singles – Doubles – Mixed doubles	(Chinese Taipei) Latisha Chan (Croatia) Ivan Dodig; 6–1, 6–7^{(5–7)}, [10–8]	(Canada) Gabriela Dabrowski (Croatia) Mate Pavić	(Argentina) Juan Martín del Potro (Italy) Marco Cecchinato	(Argentina) Diego Schwartzman (Croatia) Marin Čilić (Serbia) Novak Djokovic (Germany) Alexander Zverev

=== June ===
Week	Tournament	Champions	Runners-up	Semifinalists	Quarterfinalists
11 Jun	MercedesCup; Stuttgart, Germany; ATP World Tour 250; Grass – €729,340 – 28S/16Q/16D; Singles – Doubles	(Switzerland) Roger Federer; 6–4, 7–6^{(7–3)}	(Canada) Milos Raonic	(Australia) Nick Kyrgios (France) Lucas Pouille	(Argentina) Guido Pella (Spain) Feliciano López (Czech Republic) Tomáš Berdych (Uzbekistan) Denis Istomin
11 Jun	MercedesCup; Stuttgart, Germany; ATP World Tour 250; Grass – €729,340 – 28S/16Q/16D; Singles – Doubles	(Germany) Philipp Petzschner (Germany) Tim Pütz; 7–6^{(7–5)}, 6–3	(Sweden) Robert Lindstedt (Poland) Marcin Matkowski	(Australia) Nick Kyrgios (France) Lucas Pouille	(Argentina) Guido Pella (Spain) Feliciano López (Czech Republic) Tomáš Berdych (Uzbekistan) Denis Istomin
11 Jun	Rosmalen Grass Court Championships 's-Hertogenbosch, Netherlands; ATP World Tour 250; Grass – €686,080 – 28S/16Q/16D; Singles – Doubles	(France) Richard Gasquet; 6–3, 7–6^{(7–5)}	(France) Jérémy Chardy	(Australia) Matthew Ebden (Australia) Bernard Tomic	(United States) Mackenzie McDonald (Romania) Marius Copil (Spain) Fernando Verdasco (Greece) Stefanos Tsitsipas
11 Jun	Rosmalen Grass Court Championships 's-Hertogenbosch, Netherlands; ATP World Tour 250; Grass – €686,080 – 28S/16Q/16D; Singles – Doubles	(United Kingdom) Dominic Inglot (Croatia) Franko Škugor; 7–6^{(7–3)}, 7–5	(South Africa) Raven Klaasen (New Zealand) Michael Venus	(Australia) Matthew Ebden (Australia) Bernard Tomic	(United States) Mackenzie McDonald (Romania) Marius Copil (Spain) Fernando Verdasco (Greece) Stefanos Tsitsipas
18 Jun	Halle Open; Halle, Germany; ATP World Tour 500; Grass – €2,116,915 – 32S/16Q/16D/4Q; Singles – Doubles	(Croatia) Borna Ćorić; 7–6^{(8–6)}, 3–6, 6–2	(Switzerland) Roger Federer	(United States) Denis Kudla (Spain) Roberto Bautista Agut	(Australia) Matthew Ebden (Japan) Yūichi Sugita (Russia) Karen Khachanov (Italy) Andreas Seppi
18 Jun	Halle Open; Halle, Germany; ATP World Tour 500; Grass – €2,116,915 – 32S/16Q/16D/4Q; Singles – Doubles	(Poland) Łukasz Kubot (Brazil) Marcelo Melo; 7–6^{(7–1)}, 6–4	(Germany) Alexander Zverev (Germany) Mischa Zverev	(United States) Denis Kudla (Spain) Roberto Bautista Agut	(Australia) Matthew Ebden (Japan) Yūichi Sugita (Russia) Karen Khachanov (Italy) Andreas Seppi
18 Jun	Queen's Club Championships; London, United Kingdom; ATP World Tour 500; Grass – €2,116,915 – 32S/16Q/16D/4Q; Singles – Doubles	(Croatia) Marin Čilić; 5–7, 7–6^{(7–4)}, 6–3	(Serbia) Novak Djokovic	(Australia) Nick Kyrgios (France) Jérémy Chardy	(United States) Sam Querrey (Spain) Feliciano López (United States) Frances Tiafoe (France) Adrian Mannarino
18 Jun	Queen's Club Championships; London, United Kingdom; ATP World Tour 500; Grass – €2,116,915 – 32S/16Q/16D/4Q; Singles – Doubles	(Finland) Henri Kontinen (Australia) John Peers; 6–4, 6–3	(United Kingdom) Jamie Murray (Brazil) Bruno Soares	(Australia) Nick Kyrgios (France) Jérémy Chardy	(United States) Sam Querrey (Spain) Feliciano López (United States) Frances Tiafoe (France) Adrian Mannarino
25 Jun	Eastbourne International; Eastbourne, United Kingdom; ATP World Tour 250; Grass – €721,085 – 28S/16Q/16D; Singles – Doubles	(Germany) Mischa Zverev; 6–4, 6–4	(Slovakia) Lukáš Lacko	(Italy) Marco Cecchinato (Kazakhstan) Mikhail Kukushkin	(United Kingdom) Cameron Norrie (Australia) John Millman (Canada) Denis Shapovalov (United Kingdom) Kyle Edmund
25 Jun	Eastbourne International; Eastbourne, United Kingdom; ATP World Tour 250; Grass – €721,085 – 28S/16Q/16D; Singles – Doubles	(United Kingdom) Luke Bambridge (United Kingdom) Jonny O'Mara; 7–5, 6–4	(United Kingdom) Ken Skupski (United Kingdom) Neal Skupski	(Italy) Marco Cecchinato (Kazakhstan) Mikhail Kukushkin	(United Kingdom) Cameron Norrie (Australia) John Millman (Canada) Denis Shapovalov (United Kingdom) Kyle Edmund
25 Jun	Antalya Open; Antalya, Turkey; ATP World Tour 250; Grass – €486,145 – 28S/16Q/16D; Singles – Doubles	(Bosnia and Herzegovina) Damir Džumhur; 6–1, 1–6, 6–1	(France) Adrian Mannarino	(France) Gaël Monfils (Czech Republic) Jiří Veselý	(Portugal) João Sousa (Spain) Guillermo García López (Georgia (country)) Nikoloz Basilashvili (France) Pierre-Hugues Herbert
25 Jun	Antalya Open; Antalya, Turkey; ATP World Tour 250; Grass – €486,145 – 28S/16Q/16D; Singles – Doubles	(Brazil) Marcelo Demoliner (Mexico) Santiago González; 7–5, 6–7^{(6–8)}, [10–8]	(Netherlands) Sander Arends (Netherlands) Matwé Middelkoop	(France) Gaël Monfils (Czech Republic) Jiří Veselý	(Portugal) João Sousa (Spain) Guillermo García López (Georgia (country)) Nikoloz Basilashvili (France) Pierre-Hugues Herbert

=== July ===
Week	Tournament	Champions	Runners-up	Semifinalists	Quarterfinalists
2 Jul; 9 Jul	Wimbledon; London, United Kingdom; Grand Slam; Grass – £16,184,500; 128S/128Q/64D/16Q/48X; Singles – Doubles – Mixed doubles	(Serbia) Novak Djokovic; 6–2, 6–2, 7–6^{(7–3)}	(South Africa) Kevin Anderson	(United States) John Isner (Spain) Rafael Nadal	(Switzerland) Roger Federer (Canada) Milos Raonic (Japan) Kei Nishikori (Argentina) Juan Martín del Potro
2 Jul; 9 Jul	Wimbledon; London, United Kingdom; Grand Slam; Grass – £16,184,500; 128S/128Q/64D/16Q/48X; Singles – Doubles – Mixed doubles	(United States) Mike Bryan (United States) Jack Sock; 6–3, 6–7^{(7–9)}, 6–3, 5–7, 7–5	(South Africa) Raven Klaasen (New Zealand) Michael Venus	(United States) John Isner (Spain) Rafael Nadal	(Switzerland) Roger Federer (Canada) Milos Raonic (Japan) Kei Nishikori (Argentina) Juan Martín del Potro
2 Jul; 9 Jul	Wimbledon; London, United Kingdom; Grand Slam; Grass – £16,184,500; 128S/128Q/64D/16Q/48X; Singles – Doubles – Mixed doubles	(Austria) Alexander Peya (United States) Nicole Melichar; 7–6^{(7–1)}, 6–3	(United Kingdom) Jamie Murray (Belarus) Victoria Azarenka	(United States) John Isner (Spain) Rafael Nadal	(Switzerland) Roger Federer (Canada) Milos Raonic (Japan) Kei Nishikori (Argentina) Juan Martín del Potro
16 Jul	Hall of Fame Tennis Championships; Newport, United States; ATP World Tour 250; Grass – $623,710 – 28S/16Q/16D; Singles – Doubles	(United States) Steve Johnson; 7–5, 3–6, 6–2	(India) Ramkumar Ramanathan	(Spain) Marcel Granollers (United States) Tim Smyczek	(France) Adrian Mannarino (Israel) Dudi Sela (Chinese Taipei) Jason Jung (Canada) Vasek Pospisil
16 Jul	Hall of Fame Tennis Championships; Newport, United States; ATP World Tour 250; Grass – $623,710 – 28S/16Q/16D; Singles – Doubles	(Israel) Jonathan Erlich (New Zealand) Artem Sitak; 6–1, 6–2	(El Salvador) Marcelo Arévalo (Mexico) Miguel Ángel Reyes-Varela	(Spain) Marcel Granollers (United States) Tim Smyczek	(France) Adrian Mannarino (Israel) Dudi Sela (Chinese Taipei) Jason Jung (Canada) Vasek Pospisil
16 Jul	Swedish Open; Båstad, Sweden; ATP World Tour 250; Clay (red) – €561,345 – 28S/16Q/16D; Singles – Doubles	(Italy) Fabio Fognini; 6–3, 3–6, 6–1	(France) Richard Gasquet	(Switzerland) Henri Laaksonen (Spain) Fernando Verdasco	(Italy) Simone Bolelli (Norway) Casper Ruud (Argentina) Federico Delbonis (Spain) Pablo Carreño Busta
16 Jul	Swedish Open; Båstad, Sweden; ATP World Tour 250; Clay (red) – €561,345 – 28S/16Q/16D; Singles – Doubles	(Chile) Julio Peralta (Argentina) Horacio Zeballos; 6–3, 6–4	(Italy) Simone Bolelli (Italy) Fabio Fognini	(Switzerland) Henri Laaksonen (Spain) Fernando Verdasco	(Italy) Simone Bolelli (Norway) Casper Ruud (Argentina) Federico Delbonis (Spain) Pablo Carreño Busta
16 Jul	Croatia Open; Umag, Croatia; ATP World Tour 250; Clay (red) – €561,345 – 28S/16Q/16D; Singles – Doubles	(Italy) Marco Cecchinato; 6–2, 7–6^{(7–4)}	(Argentina) Guido Pella	(Netherlands) Robin Haase (Argentina) Marco Trungelliti	(Serbia) Dušan Lajović (Russia) Andrey Rublev (Serbia) Laslo Đere (Russia) Evgeny Donskoy
16 Jul	Croatia Open; Umag, Croatia; ATP World Tour 250; Clay (red) – €561,345 – 28S/16Q/16D; Singles – Doubles	(Netherlands) Robin Haase (Netherlands) Matwé Middelkoop; 6–4, 6–4	(Czech Republic) Roman Jebavý (Czech Republic) Jiří Veselý	(Netherlands) Robin Haase (Argentina) Marco Trungelliti	(Serbia) Dušan Lajović (Russia) Andrey Rublev (Serbia) Laslo Đere (Russia) Evgeny Donskoy
23 Jul	German Open; Hamburg, Germany; ATP World Tour 500; Clay (red) – €1,753,255 – 32S/16Q/16D/4Q; Singles – Doubles	(Georgia (country)) Nikoloz Basilashvili; 6–4, 0–6, 7–5	(Argentina) Leonardo Mayer	(Chile) Nicolás Jarry (Slovakia) Jozef Kovalík	(Austria) Dominic Thiem (Spain) Pablo Carreño Busta (Brazil) Thiago Monteiro (Argentina) Diego Schwartzman
23 Jul	German Open; Hamburg, Germany; ATP World Tour 500; Clay (red) – €1,753,255 – 32S/16Q/16D/4Q; Singles – Doubles	(Chile) Julio Peralta (Argentina) Horacio Zeballos; 6–1, 4–6, [10–6]	(Austria) Oliver Marach (Croatia) Mate Pavić	(Chile) Nicolás Jarry (Slovakia) Jozef Kovalík	(Austria) Dominic Thiem (Spain) Pablo Carreño Busta (Brazil) Thiago Monteiro (Argentina) Diego Schwartzman
23 Jul	Atlanta Open; Atlanta, United States; ATP World Tour 250; Hard – $748,450 – 28S/16Q/16D; Singles – Doubles	(United States) John Isner; 5–7, 6–3, 6–4	(United States) Ryan Harrison	(Australia) Matthew Ebden (United Kingdom) Cameron Norrie	(Germany) Mischa Zverev (Cyprus) Marcos Baghdatis (South Korea) Chung Hyeon (Australia) Nick Kyrgios
23 Jul	Atlanta Open; Atlanta, United States; ATP World Tour 250; Hard – $748,450 – 28S/16Q/16D; Singles – Doubles	(United States) Nicholas Monroe (Australia) John-Patrick Smith; 3–6, 7–6^{(7–5)}, [10–8]	(United States) Ryan Harrison (United States) Rajeev Ram	(Australia) Matthew Ebden (United Kingdom) Cameron Norrie	(Germany) Mischa Zverev (Cyprus) Marcos Baghdatis (South Korea) Chung Hyeon (Australia) Nick Kyrgios
23 Jul	Swiss Open; Gstaad, Switzerland; ATP World Tour 250; Clay (red) – €561,345 – 28S/16Q/16D; Singles – Doubles	(Italy) Matteo Berrettini; 7–6^{(11–9)}, 6–4	(Spain) Roberto Bautista Agut	(Estonia) Jürgen Zopp (Serbia) Laslo Đere	(Argentina) Facundo Bagnis (Spain) Feliciano López (Croatia) Viktor Galović (Japan) Taro Daniel
23 Jul	Swiss Open; Gstaad, Switzerland; ATP World Tour 250; Clay (red) – €561,345 – 28S/16Q/16D; Singles – Doubles	(Italy) Matteo Berrettini (Italy) Daniele Bracciali; 7–6^{(7–2)}, 7–6^{(7–5)}	(Ukraine) Denys Molchanov (Slovakia) Igor Zelenay	(Estonia) Jürgen Zopp (Serbia) Laslo Đere	(Argentina) Facundo Bagnis (Spain) Feliciano López (Croatia) Viktor Galović (Japan) Taro Daniel
30 Jul	Washington Open; Washington, D.C., United States; ATP World Tour 500; Hard – $2,146,815 – 48S/20Q/16D/3Q; Singles – Doubles	(Germany) Alexander Zverev; 6–2, 6–4	(Australia) Alex de Minaur	(Greece) Stefanos Tsitsipas (Russia) Andrey Rublev	(Japan) Kei Nishikori (Belgium) David Goffin (United Kingdom) Andy Murray (United States) Denis Kudla
30 Jul	Washington Open; Washington, D.C., United States; ATP World Tour 500; Hard – $2,146,815 – 48S/20Q/16D/3Q; Singles – Doubles	(United Kingdom) Jamie Murray (Brazil) Bruno Soares; 3–6, 6–3, [10–4]	(United States) Mike Bryan (France) Édouard Roger-Vasselin	(Greece) Stefanos Tsitsipas (Russia) Andrey Rublev	(Japan) Kei Nishikori (Belgium) David Goffin (United Kingdom) Andy Murray (United States) Denis Kudla
30 Jul	Los Cabos Open; Cabo San Lucas, Mexico; ATP World Tour 250; Hard – $808,770 – 28S/16Q/16D; Singles – Doubles	(Italy) Fabio Fognini; 6–4, 6–2	(Argentina) Juan Martín del Potro	(Bosnia and Herzegovina) Damir Džumhur (United Kingdom) Cameron Norrie	(Belarus) Egor Gerasimov (United States) Michael Mmoh (France) Adrian Mannarino (Japan) Yoshihito Nishioka
30 Jul	Los Cabos Open; Cabo San Lucas, Mexico; ATP World Tour 250; Hard – $808,770 – 28S/16Q/16D; Singles – Doubles	(El Salvador) Marcelo Arévalo (Mexico) Miguel Ángel Reyes-Varela; 6–4, 6–4	(United States) Taylor Fritz (Australia) Thanasi Kokkinakis	(Bosnia and Herzegovina) Damir Džumhur (United Kingdom) Cameron Norrie	(Belarus) Egor Gerasimov (United States) Michael Mmoh (France) Adrian Mannarino (Japan) Yoshihito Nishioka
30 Jul	Austrian Open; Kitzbühel, Austria; ATP World Tour 250; Clay (red) – €561,345 – 28S/16Q/16D; Singles – Doubles	(Slovakia) Martin Kližan; 6–2, 6–2	(Uzbekistan) Denis Istomin	(Spain) Jaume Munar (Chile) Nicolás Jarry	(Serbia) Dušan Lajović (Japan) Taro Daniel (Italy) Matteo Berrettini (Germany) Maximilian Marterer
30 Jul	Austrian Open; Kitzbühel, Austria; ATP World Tour 250; Clay (red) – €561,345 – 28S/16Q/16D; Singles – Doubles	(Czech Republic) Roman Jebavý (Argentina) Andrés Molteni; 6–2, 6–4	(Italy) Daniele Bracciali (Argentina) Federico Delbonis	(Spain) Jaume Munar (Chile) Nicolás Jarry	(Serbia) Dušan Lajović (Japan) Taro Daniel (Italy) Matteo Berrettini (Germany) Maximilian Marterer

=== August ===
Week	Tournament	Champions	Runners-up	Semifinalists	Quarterfinalists
6 Aug	Canadian Open; Toronto, Canada; ATP World Tour Masters 1000; Hard – $5,315,025 – 56S/28Q/24D; Singles – Doubles	(Spain) Rafael Nadal; 6–2, 7–6^{(7–4)}	(Greece) Stefanos Tsitsipas	(Russia) Karen Khachanov (South Africa) Kevin Anderson	(Croatia) Marin Čilić (Netherlands) Robin Haase (Bulgaria) Grigor Dimitrov (Germany) Alexander Zverev
6 Aug	Canadian Open; Toronto, Canada; ATP World Tour Masters 1000; Hard – $5,315,025 – 56S/28Q/24D; Singles – Doubles	(Finland) Henri Kontinen (Australia) John Peers; 6–2, 6–7^{(7–9)}, [10–8]	(South Africa) Raven Klaasen (New Zealand) Michael Venus	(Russia) Karen Khachanov (South Africa) Kevin Anderson	(Croatia) Marin Čilić (Netherlands) Robin Haase (Bulgaria) Grigor Dimitrov (Germany) Alexander Zverev
13 Aug	Cincinnati Open; Mason, United States; ATP World Tour Masters 1000; Hard – $5,669,360 – 56S/28Q/24D; Singles – Doubles	(Serbia) Novak Djokovic; 6–4, 6–4	(Switzerland) Roger Federer	(Croatia) Marin Čilić (Belgium) David Goffin	(Canada) Milos Raonic (Spain) Pablo Carreño Busta (Argentina) Juan Martín del Potro (Switzerland) Stan Wawrinka
13 Aug	Cincinnati Open; Mason, United States; ATP World Tour Masters 1000; Hard – $5,669,360 – 56S/28Q/24D; Singles – Doubles	(United Kingdom) Jamie Murray (Brazil) Bruno Soares; 4–6, 6–3, [10–6]	(Colombia) Juan Sebastián Cabal (Colombia) Robert Farah	(Croatia) Marin Čilić (Belgium) David Goffin	(Canada) Milos Raonic (Spain) Pablo Carreño Busta (Argentina) Juan Martín del Potro (Switzerland) Stan Wawrinka
20 Aug	Winston-Salem Open; Winston-Salem, United States; ATP World Tour 250; Hard – $778,070 – 48S/16Q/16D; Singles – Doubles	(Russia) Daniil Medvedev; 6–4, 6–4	(United States) Steve Johnson	(Japan) Taro Daniel (Spain) Pablo Carreño Busta	(United States) Ryan Harrison (Chile) Nicolás Jarry (United Kingdom) Kyle Edmund (South Korea) Chung Hyeon
20 Aug	Winston-Salem Open; Winston-Salem, United States; ATP World Tour 250; Hard – $778,070 – 48S/16Q/16D; Singles – Doubles	(Netherlands) Jean-Julien Rojer (Romania) Horia Tecău; 6–4, 6–2	(United States) James Cerretani (India) Leander Paes	(Japan) Taro Daniel (Spain) Pablo Carreño Busta	(United States) Ryan Harrison (Chile) Nicolás Jarry (United Kingdom) Kyle Edmund (South Korea) Chung Hyeon
27 Aug; 3 Sep	US Open; New York City, United States; Grand Slam; Hard – $25,030,420; 128S/128Q/64D/32X; Singles – Doubles – Mixed doubles	(Serbia) Novak Djokovic; 6–3, 7–6^{(7–4)}, 6–3	(Argentina) Juan Martín del Potro	(Spain) Rafael Nadal (Japan) Kei Nishikori	(Austria) Dominic Thiem (United States) John Isner (Croatia) Marin Čilić (Australia) John Millman
27 Aug; 3 Sep	US Open; New York City, United States; Grand Slam; Hard – $25,030,420; 128S/128Q/64D/32X; Singles – Doubles – Mixed doubles	(United States) Mike Bryan (United States) Jack Sock; 6–3, 6–1	(Poland) Łukasz Kubot (Brazil) Marcelo Melo	(Spain) Rafael Nadal (Japan) Kei Nishikori	(Austria) Dominic Thiem (United States) John Isner (Croatia) Marin Čilić (Australia) John Millman
27 Aug; 3 Sep	US Open; New York City, United States; Grand Slam; Hard – $25,030,420; 128S/128Q/64D/32X; Singles – Doubles – Mixed doubles	(United States) Bethanie Mattek-Sands (United Kingdom) Jamie Murray; 2–6, 6–3, [11–9]	(Poland) Alicja Rosolska (Croatia) Nikola Mektić	(Spain) Rafael Nadal (Japan) Kei Nishikori	(Austria) Dominic Thiem (United States) John Isner (Croatia) Marin Čilić (Australia) John Millman

=== September ===
Week	Tournament	Champions	Runners-up	Semifinalists	Quarterfinalists
10 Sep	Davis Cup Semifinals; Lille, France – hard (i); Zadar, Croatia – clay	Semifinal winners France 3–2; Croatia 3–2	Semifinal losers Spain; United States		
17 Sep	St. Petersburg Open; St. Petersburg, Russia; ATP World Tour 250; Hard (i) – $1,241,850 – 28S/16Q/16D; Singles – Doubles	(Austria) Dominic Thiem; 6–3, 6–1	(Slovakia) Martin Kližan	(Spain) Roberto Bautista Agut (Switzerland) Stan Wawrinka	(Russia) Daniil Medvedev (Italy) Marco Cecchinato (Bosnia and Herzegovina) Damir Džumhur (Canada) Denis Shapovalov
17 Sep	St. Petersburg Open; St. Petersburg, Russia; ATP World Tour 250; Hard (i) – $1,241,850 – 28S/16Q/16D; Singles – Doubles	(Italy) Matteo Berrettini (Italy) Fabio Fognini; 7–6^{(8–6)}, 7–6^{(7–4)}	(Czech Republic) Roman Jebavý (Netherlands) Matwé Middelkoop	(Spain) Roberto Bautista Agut (Switzerland) Stan Wawrinka	(Russia) Daniil Medvedev (Italy) Marco Cecchinato (Bosnia and Herzegovina) Damir Džumhur (Canada) Denis Shapovalov
17 Sep	Moselle Open; Metz, France; ATP World Tour 250; Hard (i) – €561,345 – 28S/16Q/16D; Singles – Doubles	(France) Gilles Simon; 7–6^{(7–2)}, 6–1	(Germany) Matthias Bachinger	(Japan) Kei Nishikori (Moldova) Radu Albot	(Georgia (country)) Nikoloz Basilashvili (Germany) Yannick Maden (France) Richard Gasquet (Lithuania) Ričardas Berankis
17 Sep	Moselle Open; Metz, France; ATP World Tour 250; Hard (i) – €561,345 – 28S/16Q/16D; Singles – Doubles	(France) Nicolas Mahut (France) Édouard Roger-Vasselin; 6–1, 7–5	(United Kingdom) Ken Skupski (United Kingdom) Neal Skupski	(Japan) Kei Nishikori (Moldova) Radu Albot	(Georgia (country)) Nikoloz Basilashvili (Germany) Yannick Maden (France) Richard Gasquet (Lithuania) Ričardas Berankis
24 Sep	Chengdu Open; Chengdu, China; ATP World Tour 250; Hard – $1,183,360 – 28S/16Q/16D; Singles – Doubles	(Australia) Bernard Tomic; 6–1, 3–6, 7–6^{(9–7)}	(Italy) Fabio Fognini	(United States) Taylor Fritz (Portugal) João Sousa	(Australia) Matthew Ebden (United States) Sam Querrey (Tunisia) Malek Jaziri (Canada) Félix Auger-Aliassime
24 Sep	Chengdu Open; Chengdu, China; ATP World Tour 250; Hard – $1,183,360 – 28S/16Q/16D; Singles – Doubles	(Croatia) Ivan Dodig (Croatia) Mate Pavić; 6–2, 6–4	(United States) Austin Krajicek (India) Jeevan Nedunchezhiyan	(United States) Taylor Fritz (Portugal) João Sousa	(Australia) Matthew Ebden (United States) Sam Querrey (Tunisia) Malek Jaziri (Canada) Félix Auger-Aliassime
24 Sep	Shenzhen Open; Shenzhen, China; ATP World Tour 250; Hard – $800,320 – 28S/16Q/16D; Singles – Doubles	(Japan) Yoshihito Nishioka; 7–5, 2–6, 6–4	(France) Pierre-Hugues Herbert	(Spain) Fernando Verdasco (Australia) Alex de Minaur	(United Kingdom) Andy Murray (United Kingdom) Cameron Norrie (Bosnia and Herzegovina) Damir Džumhur (Spain) Albert Ramos Viñolas
24 Sep	Shenzhen Open; Shenzhen, China; ATP World Tour 250; Hard – $800,320 – 28S/16Q/16D; Singles – Doubles	(Japan) Ben McLachlan (United Kingdom) Joe Salisbury; 7–6^{(7–5)}, 7–6^{(7–4)}	(Sweden) Robert Lindstedt (United States) Rajeev Ram	(Spain) Fernando Verdasco (Australia) Alex de Minaur	(United Kingdom) Andy Murray (United Kingdom) Cameron Norrie (Bosnia and Herzegovina) Damir Džumhur (Spain) Albert Ramos Viñolas

=== October ===
Week	Tournament	Champions	Runners-up	Semifinalists	Quarterfinalists
1 Oct	China Open; Beijing, China; ATP World Tour 500; Hard – $4,658,510 – 32S/16Q/16D; Singles – Doubles	(Georgia (country)) Nikoloz Basilashvili; 6–4, 6–4	(Argentina) Juan Martín del Potro	(Italy) Fabio Fognini (United Kingdom) Kyle Edmund	(Serbia) Filip Krajinović (Hungary) Márton Fucsovics (Serbia) Dušan Lajović (Tunisia) Malek Jaziri
1 Oct	China Open; Beijing, China; ATP World Tour 500; Hard – $4,658,510 – 32S/16Q/16D; Singles – Doubles	(Poland) Łukasz Kubot (Brazil) Marcelo Melo; 6–1, 6–4	(Austria) Oliver Marach (Croatia) Mate Pavić	(Italy) Fabio Fognini (United Kingdom) Kyle Edmund	(Serbia) Filip Krajinović (Hungary) Márton Fucsovics (Serbia) Dušan Lajović (Tunisia) Malek Jaziri
1 Oct	Japan Open; Tokyo, Japan; ATP World Tour 500; Hard (i) – $1,928,580 – 32S/16Q/16D; Singles – Doubles	(Russia) Daniil Medvedev; 6–2, 6–4	(Japan) Kei Nishikori	(Canada) Denis Shapovalov (France) Richard Gasquet	(Germany) Jan-Lennard Struff (Canada) Milos Raonic (Greece) Stefanos Tsitsipas (South Africa) Kevin Anderson
1 Oct	Japan Open; Tokyo, Japan; ATP World Tour 500; Hard (i) – $1,928,580 – 32S/16Q/16D; Singles – Doubles	(Japan) Ben McLachlan (Germany) Jan-Lennard Struff; 6–4, 7–5	(South Africa) Raven Klaasen (New Zealand) Michael Venus	(Canada) Denis Shapovalov (France) Richard Gasquet	(Germany) Jan-Lennard Struff (Canada) Milos Raonic (Greece) Stefanos Tsitsipas (South Africa) Kevin Anderson
8 Oct	Shanghai Masters; Shanghai, China; ATP World Tour Masters 1000; Hard – $7,086,700 – 56S/28Q/24D; Singles – Doubles	(Serbia) Novak Djokovic; 6–3, 6–4	(Croatia) Borna Ćorić	(Switzerland) Roger Federer (Germany) Alexander Zverev	(Japan) Kei Nishikori (Australia) Matthew Ebden (United Kingdom) Kyle Edmund (South Africa) Kevin Anderson
8 Oct	Shanghai Masters; Shanghai, China; ATP World Tour Masters 1000; Hard – $7,086,700 – 56S/28Q/24D; Singles – Doubles	(Poland) Łukasz Kubot (Brazil) Marcelo Melo; 6–4, 6–2	(United Kingdom) Jamie Murray (Brazil) Bruno Soares	(Switzerland) Roger Federer (Germany) Alexander Zverev	(Japan) Kei Nishikori (Australia) Matthew Ebden (United Kingdom) Kyle Edmund (South Africa) Kevin Anderson
15 Oct	Kremlin Cup; Moscow, Russia; ATP World Tour 250; Hard (i) – $936,435 – 28S/16Q/16D; Singles – Doubles	(Russia) Karen Khachanov; 6–2, 6–2	(France) Adrian Mannarino	(Italy) Andreas Seppi (Russia) Daniil Medvedev	(Belarus) Egor Gerasimov (Serbia) Filip Krajinović (Bosnia and Herzegovina) Mirza Bašić (Lithuania) Ričardas Berankis
15 Oct	Kremlin Cup; Moscow, Russia; ATP World Tour 250; Hard (i) – $936,435 – 28S/16Q/16D; Singles – Doubles	(United States) Austin Krajicek (United States) Rajeev Ram; 7–6^{(7–4)}, 6–4	(Belarus) Max Mirnyi (Austria) Philipp Oswald	(Italy) Andreas Seppi (Russia) Daniil Medvedev	(Belarus) Egor Gerasimov (Serbia) Filip Krajinović (Bosnia and Herzegovina) Mirza Bašić (Lithuania) Ričardas Berankis
15 Oct	Stockholm Open; Stockholm, Sweden; ATP World Tour 250; Hard (i) – €686,080 – 28S/16Q/16D; Singles – Doubles	(Greece) Stefanos Tsitsipas; 6–4, 6–4	(Latvia) Ernests Gulbis	(United States) John Isner (Italy) Fabio Fognini	(United States) Tennys Sandgren (United States) Jack Sock (Germany) Philipp Kohlschreiber (South Korea) Chung Hyeon
15 Oct	Stockholm Open; Stockholm, Sweden; ATP World Tour 250; Hard (i) – €686,080 – 28S/16Q/16D; Singles – Doubles	(United Kingdom) Luke Bambridge (United Kingdom) Jonny O'Mara; 7–5, 7–6^{(10–8)}	(New Zealand) Marcus Daniell (Netherlands) Wesley Koolhof	(United States) John Isner (Italy) Fabio Fognini	(United States) Tennys Sandgren (United States) Jack Sock (Germany) Philipp Kohlschreiber (South Korea) Chung Hyeon
15 Oct	European Open; Antwerp, Belgium; ATP World Tour 250; Hard (i) – €686,080 – 28S/16Q/16D; Singles – Doubles	(United Kingdom) Kyle Edmund; 3–6, 7–6^{(7–2)}, 7–6^{(7–4)}	(France) Gaël Monfils	(France) Richard Gasquet (Argentina) Diego Schwartzman	(Belarus) Ilya Ivashka (Germany) Jan-Lennard Struff (Canada) Vasek Pospisil (France) Gilles Simon
15 Oct	European Open; Antwerp, Belgium; ATP World Tour 250; Hard (i) – €686,080 – 28S/16Q/16D; Singles – Doubles	(France) Nicolas Mahut (France) Édouard Roger-Vasselin; 6–4, 7–5	(Brazil) Marcelo Demoliner (Mexico) Santiago González	(France) Richard Gasquet (Argentina) Diego Schwartzman	(Belarus) Ilya Ivashka (Germany) Jan-Lennard Struff (Canada) Vasek Pospisil (France) Gilles Simon
22 Oct	Vienna Open; Vienna, Austria; ATP World Tour 500; Hard (i) – €2,788,570 – 32S/16Q/16D; Singles – Doubles	(South Africa) Kevin Anderson; 6–3, 7–6^{(7–3)}	(Japan) Kei Nishikori	(Kazakhstan) Mikhail Kukushkin (Spain) Fernando Verdasco	(Austria) Dominic Thiem (Hungary) Márton Fucsovics (France) Gaël Monfils (Croatia) Borna Ćorić
22 Oct	Vienna Open; Vienna, Austria; ATP World Tour 500; Hard (i) – €2,788,570 – 32S/16Q/16D; Singles – Doubles	(United Kingdom) Joe Salisbury (United Kingdom) Neal Skupski; 7–6^{(7–5)}, 6–3	(United States) Mike Bryan (France) Édouard Roger-Vasselin	(Kazakhstan) Mikhail Kukushkin (Spain) Fernando Verdasco	(Austria) Dominic Thiem (Hungary) Márton Fucsovics (France) Gaël Monfils (Croatia) Borna Ćorić
22 Oct	Swiss Indoors; Basel, Switzerland; ATP World Tour 500; Hard (i) – €2,442,740 – 32S/16Q/16D; Singles – Doubles	(Switzerland) Roger Federer; 7–6^{(7–5)}, 6–4	(Romania) Marius Copil	(Russia) Daniil Medvedev (Germany) Alexander Zverev	(France) Gilles Simon (Greece) Stefanos Tsitsipas (United States) Taylor Fritz (Spain) Roberto Bautista Agut
22 Oct	Swiss Indoors; Basel, Switzerland; ATP World Tour 500; Hard (i) – €2,442,740 – 32S/16Q/16D; Singles – Doubles	(United Kingdom) Dominic Inglot (Croatia) Franko Škugor; 6–2, 7–5	(Germany) Alexander Zverev (Germany) Mischa Zverev	(Russia) Daniil Medvedev (Germany) Alexander Zverev	(France) Gilles Simon (Greece) Stefanos Tsitsipas (United States) Taylor Fritz (Spain) Roberto Bautista Agut
29 Oct	Paris Masters; Paris, France; ATP World Tour Masters 1000; Hard (i) – €4,872,105 – 48S/24Q/24D; Singles – Doubles	(Russia) Karen Khachanov; 7–5, 6–4	(Serbia) Novak Djokovic	(Austria) Dominic Thiem (Switzerland) Roger Federer	(United States) Jack Sock (Germany) Alexander Zverev (Japan) Kei Nishikori (Croatia) Marin Čilić
29 Oct	Paris Masters; Paris, France; ATP World Tour Masters 1000; Hard (i) – €4,872,105 – 48S/24Q/24D; Singles – Doubles	(Spain) Marcel Granollers (United States) Rajeev Ram; 6–4, 6–4	(Netherlands) Jean-Julien Rojer (Romania) Horia Tecău	(Austria) Dominic Thiem (Switzerland) Roger Federer	(United States) Jack Sock (Germany) Alexander Zverev (Japan) Kei Nishikori (Croatia) Marin Čilić

=== November ===
Week	Tournament	Champions	Runners-up	Semifinalists	Quarterfinalists
5 Nov	Next Gen ATP Finals; Milan, Italy; Next Generation ATP Finals; Hard (i) – $1,335,000 – 8S (RR); Singles	(Greece) Stefanos Tsitsipas; 2–4, 4–1, 4–3^{(7–3)}, 4–3^{(7–3)}	(Australia) Alex de Minaur	(Russia) Andrey Rublev (3rd) (Spain) Jaume Munar (4th)	Round Robin (Poland) Hubert Hurkacz (United States) Frances Tiafoe (United States) Taylor Fritz (Italy) Liam Caruana
12 Nov	ATP Finals; London, United Kingdom; ATP Finals; Hard (i) – $8,500,000 – 8S/8D (RR); Singles – Doubles	(Germany) Alexander Zverev; 6–4, 6–3	(Serbia) Novak Djokovic	(South Africa) Kevin Anderson (Switzerland) Roger Federer	Round Robin (Croatia) Marin Čilić (United States) John Isner (Austria) Dominic Thiem (Japan) Kei Nishikori
12 Nov	ATP Finals; London, United Kingdom; ATP Finals; Hard (i) – $8,500,000 – 8S/8D (RR); Singles – Doubles	(United States) Mike Bryan (United States) Jack Sock; 5–7, 6–1, [13–11]	(France) Pierre-Hugues Herbert (France) Nicolas Mahut	(South Africa) Kevin Anderson (Switzerland) Roger Federer	Round Robin (Croatia) Marin Čilić (United States) John Isner (Austria) Dominic Thiem (Japan) Kei Nishikori
19 Nov	Davis Cup Final; Lille, France – clay (i)	Croatia; 3–1	France		

== Statistical information ==
These tables present the number of singles (S), doubles (D), and mixed doubles (X) titles won by each player and each nation during the season, within all the tournament categories of the 2018 ATP World Tour: the Grand Slam tournaments, the ATP Finals, the ATP World Tour Masters 1000, the ATP World Tour 500 series, and the ATP World Tour 250 series. The players/nations are sorted by:

1. Total number of titles (a doubles title won by two players representing the same nation counts as only one win for the nation);
2. Cumulated importance of those titles (one Grand Slam win equalling two Masters 1000 wins, one undefeated ATP Finals win equalling one-and-a-half Masters 1000 win, one Masters 1000 win equalling two 500 events wins, one 500 event win equalling two 250 events wins);
3. A singles > doubles > mixed doubles hierarchy;
4. Alphabetical order (by family names for players).

Key
Grand Slam
ATP Finals
ATP World Tour Masters 1000
ATP World Tour 500
ATP World Tour 250

=== Titles won by player ===
Total	Player	Grand Slam			ATP Finals		Masters 1000		Tour 500		Tour 250		Total		
Total	Player	S	D	X	S	D	S	D	S	D	S	D	S	D	X
6	Jack Sock (USA)		● ●			●		●				● ●	0	6	0
6	Mate Pavić (CRO)		●	●								● ● ● ●	0	5	1
5	Mike Bryan (USA)		● ●			●		● ●					0	5	0
5	Rafael Nadal (ESP)	●					● ● ●		●				5	0	0
4	Novak Djokovic (SRB)	● ●					● ●						4	0	0
4	Roger Federer (SUI)	●							● ●		●		4	0	0
4	Nicolas Mahut (FRA)		●							●		● ●	0	4	0
4	Oliver Marach (AUT)		●									● ● ●	0	4	0
4	Jamie Murray (GBR)			●				●		● ●			0	3	1
4	Alexander Zverev (GER)				●		●		●		●		4	0	0
4	Łukasz Kubot (POL)							●		● ●		●	0	4	0
4	Marcelo Melo (BRA)							●		● ●		●	0	4	0
4	Dominic Inglot (GBR)									●		● ● ●	0	4	0
4	Fabio Fognini (ITA)										● ● ●	●	3	1	0
3	Alexander Peya (AUT)			●				●				●	0	2	1
3	Ivan Dodig (CRO)			●								● ●	0	2	1
3	John Isner (USA)						●	●			●		2	1	0
3	Karen Khachanov (RUS)						●				● ●		3	0	0
3	Bruno Soares (BRA)							●		● ●			0	3	0
3	Henri Kontinen (FIN)							●		●		●	0	3	0
3	John Peers (AUS)							●		●		●	0	3	0
3	Rajeev Ram (USA)							●				● ●	0	3	0
3	Daniil Medvedev (RUS)								●		● ●		3	0	0
3	Franko Škugor (CRO)									●		● ●	0	3	0
3	Horacio Zeballos (ARG)									●		● ●	0	3	0
3	Dominic Thiem (AUT)										● ● ●		3	0	0
3	Matteo Berrettini (ITA)										●	● ●	1	2	0
3	Robin Haase (NED)											● ● ●	0	3	0
3	Matwé Middelkoop (NED)											● ● ●	0	3	0
2	Pierre-Hugues Herbert (FRA)		●							●			0	2	0
2	Bob Bryan (USA)							● ●					0	2	0
2	Juan Martín del Potro (ARG)						●		●				2	0	0
2	Nikola Mektić (CRO)							●				●	0	2	0
2	Nikoloz Basilashvili (GEO)								● ●				2	0	0
2	Kevin Anderson (RSA)								●		●		2	0	0
2	Roberto Bautista Agut (ESP)								●		●		2	0	0
2	Ben McLachlan (JPN)									●		●	0	2	0
2	Julio Peralta (CHI)									●		●	0	2	0
2	Jean-Julien Rojer (NED)									●		●	0	2	0
2	Joe Salisbury (GBR)									●		●	0	2	0
2	Neal Skupski (GBR)									●		●	0	2	0
2	Horia Tecău (ROU)									●		●	0	2	0
2	Marco Cecchinato (ITA)										● ●		2	0	0
2	Steve Johnson (USA)										● ●		2	0	0
2	Gilles Simon (FRA)										● ●		2	0	0
2	Kyle Edmund (GBR)										●	●	1	1	0
2	Nick Kyrgios (AUS)										●	●	1	1	0
2	Luke Bambridge (GBR)											● ●	0	2	0
2	Max Mirnyi (BLR)											● ●	0	2	0
2	Andrés Molteni (ARG)											● ●	0	2	0
2	Jonny O'Mara (GBR)											● ●	0	2	0
2	Philipp Oswald (AUT)											● ●	0	2	0
2	Édouard Roger-Vasselin (FRA)											● ●	0	2	0
1	Juan Sebastián Cabal (COL)							●					0	1	0
1	Robert Farah (COL)							●					0	1	0
1	Marcel Granollers (ESP)							●					0	1	0
1	Marin Čilić (CRO)								●				1	0	0
1	Borna Ćorić (CRO)								●				1	0	0
1	Diego Schwartzman (ARG)								●				1	0	0
1	Feliciano López (ESP)									●			0	1	0
1	Marc López (ESP)									●			0	1	0
1	David Marrero (ESP)									●			0	1	0
1	Jan-Lennard Struff (GER)									●			0	1	0
1	Fernando Verdasco (ESP)									●			0	1	0
1	Pablo Andújar (ESP)										●		1	0	0
1	Mirza Bašić (BIH)										●		1	0	0
1	Roberto Carballés Baena (ESP)										●		1	0	0
1	Taro Daniel (JPN)										●		1	0	0
1	Damir Džumhur (BIH)										●		1	0	0
1	Márton Fucsovics (HUN)										●		1	0	0
1	Richard Gasquet (FRA)										●		1	0	0
1	Martin Kližan (SVK)										●		1	0	0
1	Gaël Monfils (FRA)										●		1	0	0
1	Yoshihito Nishioka (JPN)										●		1	0	0
1	Lucas Pouille (FRA)										●		1	0	0
1	João Sousa (POR)										●		1	0	0
1	Frances Tiafoe (USA)										●		1	0	0
1	Bernard Tomic (AUS)										●		1	0	0
1	Stefanos Tsitsipas (GRE)										●		1	0	0
1	Mischa Zverev (GER)										●		1	0	0
1	Marcelo Arévalo (ESA)											●	0	1	0
1	Daniele Bracciali (ITA)											●	0	1	0
1	Federico Delbonis (ARG)											●	0	1	0
1	Marcelo Demoliner (BRA)											●	0	1	0
1	Jonathan Erlich (ISR)											●	0	1	0
1	Máximo González (ARG)											●	0	1	0
1	Santiago González (MEX)											●	0	1	0
1	Nicolás Jarry (CHI)											●	0	1	0
1	Roman Jebavý (CZE)											●	0	1	0
1	Raven Klaasen (RSA)											●	0	1	0
1	Austin Krajicek (USA)											●	0	1	0
1	Robert Lindstedt (SWE)											●	0	1	0
1	Nicholas Monroe (USA)											●	0	1	0
1	Cameron Norrie (GBR)											●	0	1	0
1	Philipp Petzschner (GER)											●	0	1	0
1	Hans Podlipnik-Castillo (CHI)											●	0	1	0
1	Tim Pütz (GER)											●	0	1	0
1	Miguel Ángel Reyes-Varela (MEX)											●	0	1	0
1	Artem Sitak (NZL)											●	0	1	0
1	Ken Skupski (GBR)											●	0	1	0
1	John-Patrick Smith (AUS)											●	0	1	0
1	Michael Venus (NZL)											●	0	1	0
1	Jackson Withrow (USA)											●	0	1	0

=== Titles won by nation ===
Total	Nation	Grand Slam			ATP Finals		Masters 1000		Tour 500		Tour 250		Total		
Total	Nation	S	D	X	S	D	S	D	S	D	S	D	S	D	X
17	United States (USA)		2			1	1	4			4	5	5	12	0
15	Croatia (CRO)		1	2				1	2	1		8	2	11	2
15	Great Britain (GBR)			1				1		4	1	8	1	13	1
12	Austria (AUT)		1	1				1			3	6	3	8	1
12	Spain (ESP)	1					3	1	2	2	3		9	3	0
9	France (FRA)		1							1	5	2	5	4	0
8	Brazil (BRA)							2		4		2	0	8	0
8	Argentina (ARG)						1		2	1		4	3	5	0
8	Italy (ITA)										6	2	6	2	0
7	Germany (GER)				1		1		1	1	2	1	5	2	0
7	Australia (AUS)							1		1	2	3	2	5	0
6	Russia (RUS)						1		1		4		6	0	0
5	Netherlands (NED)									1		4	0	5	0
4	Serbia (SRB)	2					2						4	0	0
4	Switzerland (SUI)	1							2		1		4	0	0
4	Poland (POL)							1		2		1	0	4	0
4	Japan (JPN)									1	2	1	2	2	0
3	Finland (FIN)							1		1		1	0	3	0
3	South Africa (RSA)								1		1	1	2	1	0
3	Chile (CHI)									1		2	0	3	0
2	Georgia (GEO)								2				2	0	0
2	Romania (ROU)									1		1	0	2	0
2	Bosnia and Herzegovina (BIH)										2		2	0	0
2	Belarus (BLR)											2	0	2	0
2	Mexico (MEX)											2	0	2	0
2	New Zealand (NZL)											2	0	2	0
1	Colombia (COL)							1					0	1	0
1	Greece (GRE)										1		1	0	0
1	Hungary (HUN)										1		1	0	0
1	Portugal (POR)										1		1	0	0
1	Slovakia (SVK)										1		1	0	0
1	Czech Republic (CZE)											1	0	1	0
1	El Salvador (ESA)											1	0	1	0
1	Israel (ISR)											1	0	1	0
1	Sweden (SWE)											1	0	1	0

=== Titles information ===
The following players won their first main circuit title in singles, doubles or mixed doubles:

Singles

- (Russia) Daniil Medvedev – Sydney (draw)
- (Bosnia and Herzegovina) Mirza Bašić – Sofia (draw)
- (Spain) Roberto Carballés Baena – Quito (draw)
- (United States) Frances Tiafoe – Delray Beach (draw)
- (Italy) Marco Cecchinato – Budapest (draw)
- (Japan) Taro Daniel – Istanbul (draw)
- (Hungary) Márton Fucsovics – Geneva (draw)
- (Germany) Mischa Zverev – Eastbourne (draw)
- (Italy) Matteo Berrettini – Gstaad (draw)
- (Georgia (country)) Nikoloz Basilashvili – Hamburg (draw)
- (Japan) Yoshihito Nishioka – Shenzhen (draw)
- (Greece) Stefanos Tsitsipas – Stockholm (draw)
- (United Kingdom) Kyle Edmund – Antwerp (draw)

Doubles

- (Chile) Nicolás Jarry – Quito (draw)
- (Chile) Hans Podlipnik Castillo – Quito (draw)
- (United Kingdom) Neal Skupski – Montpellier (draw)
- (United States) Jackson Withrow – Delray Beach (draw)
- (Argentina) Federico Delbonis – São Paulo (draw)
- (Croatia) Franko Škugor – Budapest (draw)
- (United Kingdom) Kyle Edmund – Estoril (draw)
- (United Kingdom) Cameron Norrie – Estoril (draw)
- (Australia) Nick Kyrgios – Lyon (draw)
- (Germany) Tim Pütz – Stuttgart (draw)
- (United Kingdom) Luke Bambridge – Eastbourne (draw)
- (United Kingdom) Jonny O'Mara – Eastbourne (draw)
- (Brazil) Marcelo Demoliner – Antalya (draw)
- (Italy) Matteo Berrettini – Gstaad (draw)
- (Australia) John-Patrick Smith – Atlanta (draw)
- (El Salvador) Marcelo Arévalo – Los Cabos (draw)
- (Mexico) Miguel Ángel Reyes-Varela – Los Cabos (draw)
- (United Kingdom) Joe Salisbury – Shenzhen (draw)
- (Germany) Jan-Lennard Struff – Tokyo (draw)
- (United States) Austin Krajicek – Moscow (draw)

Mixed doubles

- (Croatia) Ivan Dodig – **French Open** **(draw)**
- (Austria) Alexander Peya – **Wimbledon** **(draw)**

The following players defended a main circuit title in singles, doubles, or mixed doubles:

Singles

- (Switzerland) Roger Federer – **Australian Open** **(draw)**, Basel (draw)
- (United States) Steve Johnson – Houston (draw)
- (Spain) Rafael Nadal – Monte Carlo (draw), Barcelona (draw), **French Open** **(draw)**
- (Germany) Alexander Zverev – Munich (draw), Washington (draw)
- (United States) John Isner – Atlanta (draw)

Doubles

- (Netherlands) Jean-Julien Rojer – Dubai (draw), Winston-Salem (draw)
- (Romania) Horia Tecău – Dubai (draw), Winston-Salem (draw)
- (United Kingdom) Jamie Murray – Acapulco (draw)
- (Brazil) Bruno Soares – Acapulco (draw)
- (Poland) Łukasz Kubot – Halle (draw)
- (Brazil) Marcelo Melo – Halle (draw)
- (France) Édouard Roger-Vasselin – Metz (draw)
- (Japan) Ben McLachlan – Tokyo (draw)

Mixed doubles

- (United Kingdom) Jamie Murray – **US Open** **(draw)**

=== Best ranking ===
The following players achieved a career-high ranking this season in the top 50 (bold indicates players who entered the top 10 for the first time):

Singles

- (Croatia) Marin Čilić (reached no. 3 on January 29)
- (Russia) Andrey Rublev (reached no. 31 on February 19)
- (Slovenia) Aljaž Bedene (reached no. 43 on February 19)
- (United States) Sam Querrey (reached no. 11 on February 26)
- (United States) Jared Donaldson (reached no. 48 on March 5)
- **(France) Lucas Pouille (reached no. 10 on March 19)**
- (France) Adrian Mannarino (reached no. 22 on March 19)
- (South Korea) Chung Hyeon (reached no. 19 on April 2)
- (United States) Tennys Sandgren (reached no. 47 on April 16)
- (Serbia) Filip Krajinović (reached no. 26 on April 23)
- (Argentina) Diego Schwartzman (reached no. 11 on June 11)
- (Canada) Denis Shapovalov (reached no. 23 on June 11)
- (Germany) Peter Gojowczyk (reached no. 39 on June 25)
- (Bosnia and Herzegovina) Damir Džumhur (reached no. 23 on July 2)
- (South Africa) Kevin Anderson (reached no. 5 on July 16)
- (United States) John Isner (reached no. 8 on July 16)
- (Germany) Maximilian Marterer (reached no. 47 on July 23)
- (United States) Frances Tiafoe (reached no. 41 on July 30)
- (Argentina) Juan Martín del Potro (reached no. 3 on August 13)
- (Greece) Stefanos Tsitsipas (reached no. 15 on August 13)
- (United Kingdom) Kyle Edmund (reached no. 14 on October 8)
- (Italy) Marco Cecchinato (reached no. 19 on October 15)
- (Australia) Alex de Minaur (reached no. 31 on October 15)
- (Australia) John Millman (reached no. 33 on October 15)
- (Australia) Matthew Ebden (reached no. 39 on October 22)
- (Serbia) Dušan Lajović (reached no. 49 on October 22)
- (France) Pierre-Hugues Herbert (reached no. 50 on October 22)
- (Russia) Karen Khachanov (reached no. 11 on November 5)
- (Croatia) Borna Ćorić (reached no. 12 on November 5)
- (Russia) Daniil Medvedev (reached no. 16 on November 5)
- (Georgia (country)) Nikoloz Basilashvili (reached no. 21 on November 5)
- (Chile) Nicolás Jarry (reached no. 39 on November 5)
- (Tunisia) Malek Jaziri (reached no. 46 on November 5)
- (United States) Taylor Fritz (reached no. 47 on November 5)
- (Hungary) Márton Fucsovics (reached no. 36 on November 26)

Doubles

- (Poland) Łukasz Kubot (reached no. 1 on January 8)
- (New Zealand) Marcus Daniell (reached no. 34 on January 29)
- (Chile) Hans Podlipnik Castillo (reached no. 43 on February 12)
- (Argentina) Horacio Zeballos (reached no. 28 on March 19)
- (Argentina) Andrés Molteni (reached no. 39 on April 30)
- **(Croatia) Mate Pavić (reached no. 1 on May 21)**
- (Austria) Oliver Marach (reached no. 2 on May 28)
- (India) Divij Sharan (reached no. 36 on July 16)
- (Netherlands) Robin Haase (reached no. 33 on July 23)
- (Netherlands) Wesley Koolhof (reached no. 40 on July 30)
- (El Salvador) Marcelo Arévalo (reached no. 45 on August 6)
- (Netherlands) Matwé Middelkoop (reached no. 30 on August 27)
- (United States) Jack Sock (reached no. 2 on September 10)
- (New Zealand) Artem Sitak (reached no. 32 on September 10)
- (Argentina) Máximo González (reached no. 41 on September 10)
- (Portugal) João Sousa (reached no. 44 on October 8)
- (Czech Republic) Roman Jebavý (reached no. 46 October 8)
- (Germany) Jan-Lennard Struff (reached no. 21 on October 22)
- (Croatia) Franko Škugor (reached no. 26 on October 29)
- (United Kingdom) Joe Salisbury (reached no. 30 on October 29)
- (United Kingdom) Neal Skupski (reached no. 34 on October 29)
- (United States) Austin Krajicek (reached no. 43 on October 29)
- (Chile) Nicolás Jarry (reached no. 48 on October 29)
- (Colombia) Juan Sebastián Cabal (reached no. 5 on November 5)
- **(Colombia) Robert Farah (reached no. 5 on November 5)**
- (Croatia) Nikola Mektić (reached no. 11 on November 5)
- (Japan) Ben McLachlan (reached no. 18 on November 5)

== ATP rankings ==
These are the ATP rankings and yearly ATP Race rankings of the top 20 singles players, doubles players and doubles teams at the current date of the 2018 season.

=== Singles ===
Singles race rankings final rankings
#	Player	Points	Tours
1	Novak Djokovic (SRB)	8,045	16
2	Rafael Nadal (ESP)	7,480	13
3	Roger Federer (SUI)	6,020	16
4	Juan Martín del Potro (ARG)	5,300	18
5	Alexander Zverev (GER)	5,085	20
6	Kevin Anderson (RSA)	4,310	19
7	Marin Čilić (CRO)	4,050	18
8	Dominic Thiem (AUT)	3,895	24
9	Kei Nishikori (JPN)	3,390	23
10	John Isner (USA)	3,155	22
11	Karen Khachanov (RUS)	2,835	25
12	Borna Ćorić (CRO)	2,480	20
13	Fabio Fognini (ITA)	2,315	25
14	Kyle Edmund (GBR)	2,150	23
15	Stefanos Tsitsipas (GRE)	2,095	30
16	Daniil Medvedev (RUS)	1,977	27
17	Diego Schwartzman (ARG)	1,880	26
18	Milos Raonic (CAN)	1,855	20
19	Grigor Dimitrov (BUL)	1,835	20
20	Marco Cecchinato (ITA)	1,819	30

Player competed at the 2018 ATP Finals
Player qualified for but did not compete at the 2018 ATP Finals

Year-end rankings 2018 (31 December 2018)
#	Player	Points	#Trn	'17 Rk	High	Low	'17→'18
1	Novak Djokovic (SRB)	9,045	17	12	1	22	▲11
2	Rafael Nadal (ESP)	7,480	13	1	1	2	▼1
3	Roger Federer (SUI)	6,420	17	2	1	3	▼1
4	Alexander Zverev (GER)	6,385	21	4	3	5	Steady
5	Juan Martín del Potro (ARG)	5,300	18	11	3	11	▲6
6	Kevin Anderson (RSA)	4,710	20	14	5	14	▲8
7	Marin Čilić (CRO)	4,250	19	6	3	7	▼1
8	Dominic Thiem (AUT)	4,095	25	5	5	9	▼3
9	Kei Nishikori (JPN)	3,590	24	22	9	39	▲13
10	John Isner (USA)	3,155	23	17	8	19	▲7
11	Karen Khachanov (RUS)	2,835	25	45	11	49	▲34
12	Borna Ćorić (CRO)	2,480	20	48	12	50	▲36
13	Fabio Fognini (ITA)	2,315	25	27	13	27	▲14
14	Kyle Edmund (GBR)	2,150	23	50	14	50	▲36
15	Stefanos Tsitsipas (GRE)	2,095	30	91	15	91	▲76
16	Daniil Medvedev (RUS)	1,977	27	65	16	84	▲49
17	Diego Schwartzman (ARG)	1,880	26	26	11	26	▲9
18	Milos Raonic (CAN)	1,855	20	24	18	40	▲6
19	Grigor Dimitrov (BUL)	1,835	20	3	3	19	▼16
20	Marco Cecchinato (ITA)	1,819	30	109	19	109	▲89

==== No. 1 ranking ====
Holder	Date gained	Date forfeited
Rafael Nadal (ESP)	Year end 2017	18 February
Roger Federer (SUI)	19 February	1 April
Rafael Nadal (ESP)	2 April	13 May
Roger Federer (SUI)	14 May	20 May
Rafael Nadal (ESP)	21 May	17 June
Roger Federer (SUI)	18 June	24 June
Rafael Nadal (ESP)	25 June	4 November
Novak Djokovic (SRB)	5 November	Year end 2018

=== Doubles ===
Doubles team race rankings final rankings
#	Team	Points	Tours
1	Oliver Marach (AUT); Mate Pavić (CRO)	7,700	23
2	Juan Sebastián Cabal (COL); Robert Farah (COL)	5,830	21
3	Łukasz Kubot (POL); Marcelo Melo (BRA)	5,430	24
4	Jamie Murray (GBR); Bruno Soares (BRA)	4,940	21
5	Mike Bryan (USA); Jack Sock (USA)	4,630	7
6	Bob Bryan (USA); Mike Bryan (USA)	4,335	9
7	Raven Klaasen (RSA); Michael Venus (NZL)	4,300	24
8	Nikola Mektić (CRO); Alexander Peya (AUT)	3,920	21
9	Pierre-Hugues Herbert (FRA); Nicolas Mahut (FRA)	3,490	11
10	Henri Kontinen (FIN); John Peers (AUS)	2,740	20

Team competed at the 2018 ATP Finals
Team qualified for but did not compete at the 2018 ATP Finals

Year-end rankings 2018 (31 December 2018)
#	Player	Points	#Trn	'17 Rank	High	Low	'17→'18
1	Mike Bryan (USA)	10,840	22	11T	1	15T	▲10
2	Jack Sock (USA)	7,925	21	39	2	41	▲37
3	Mate Pavić (CRO)	7,250	25	17	1	38	▲14
4	Oliver Marach (AUT)	7,250	25	19	2	39	▲15
5	Juan Sebastián Cabal (COL)	6,140	22	23	5T	23	▲18
5	Robert Farah (COL)	6,140	22	27	5T	27	▲22
7	Jamie Murray (GBR)	5,450	22	9	7	14	▲2
7	Bruno Soares (BRA)	5,450	22	10	7T	15	▲3
9	Łukasz Kubot (POL)	5,270	25	2	1T	13	▼7
9	Marcelo Melo (BRA)	5,270	25	1	1	14	▼8
11	Nicolas Mahut (FRA)	4,880	18	6	5	21	▼5
12	Pierre-Hugues Herbert (FRA)	4,440	14	13	6	22	▲1
13	Nikola Mektić (CRO)	4,400	28	32	11	35	▲19
14	Bob Bryan (USA)	4,355	9	11T	3T	15T	▼3
15	Raven Klaasen (RSA)	4,320	25	25	13	37	▲10
16	Michael Venus (NZL)	4,320	26	15	12	25	▼1
17	Alexander Peya (AUT)	4,045	23	54	14	54	▲37
18	Ben McLachlan (JPN)	3,300	32	73	18	74	▲55
19	Jean-Julien Rojer (NED)	3,270	27	7	7	23	▼12
20	Dominic Inglot (GBR)	3,200	26	51	20	64	▲31

==== No. 1 ranking ====
Holder	Date gained	Date forfeited
Marcelo Melo (BRA)	Year end 2017	7 January
Łukasz Kubot (POL); Marcelo Melo (BRA)	8 January	29 April
Łukasz Kubot (POL)	30 April	20 May
Mate Pavić (CRO)	21 May	15 July
Mike Bryan (USA)	16 July	Year end 2018

== Best matches by ATPWorldTour.com ==
=== Best 5 Grand Slam matches ===
	Event	Round	Surface	Winner	Opponent	Result
1.	US Open	QF	Hard	(Spain) Rafael Nadal	(Austria) Dominic Thiem	0–6, 6–4, 7–5, 6–7^{(4–7)}, 7–6^{(7–5)}
2.	Wimbledon	SF	Grass (i)	(Serbia) Novak Djokovic	(Spain) Rafael Nadal	6–4, 3–6, 7–6^{(11–9)}, 3–6, 10–8
3.	Wimbledon	QF	Grass	(Spain) Rafael Nadal	(Argentina) Juan Martín del Potro	7–5, 6–7^{(7–9)}, 4–6, 6–4, 6–4
4.	US Open	R3	Hard	(Croatia) Marin Čilić	(Australia) Alex de Minaur	4–6, 3–6, 6–3, 6–4, 7–5
5.	Australian Open	F	Hard (i)	(Switzerland) Roger Federer	(Croatia) Marin Čilić	6–2, 6–7^{(5–7)}, 6–3, 3–6, 6–1

Note: Both the Wimbledon semifinal between Djokovic and Nadal, and the Australian Open men's singles final were contested in their entirety indoors despite being played at traditional outdoor events

=== Best 5 ATP World Tour matches ===
	Event	Round	Surface	Winner	Opponent	Result
1.	Paris Masters	SF	Hard (i)	(Serbia) Novak Djokovic	(Switzerland) Roger Federer	7–6^{(8–6)}, 5–7, 7–6^{(7–3)}
2.	Indian Wells Open	F	Hard	(Argentina) Juan Martín del Potro	(Switzerland) Roger Federer	6–4, 6–7^{(8–10)}, 7–6^{(7–2)}
3.	Queens Club Championships	F	Grass	(Croatia) Marin Čilić	(Serbia) Novak Djokovic	5–7, 7–6^{(7–4)}, 6–3
4.	Madrid Open	QF	Clay	(Austria) Dominic Thiem	(Spain) Rafael Nadal	7–5, 6–3
5.	Canadian Open	R3	Hard	(Spain) Rafael Nadal	(Switzerland) Stan Wawrinka	7–5, 7–6^{(7–4)}

== Point distribution ==
Category	W	F	SF	QF	R16	R32	R64	R128	Q	Q3	Q2	Q1
Grand Slam (128S)	2000	1200	720	360	180	90	45	10	25	16	8	0
ATP Finals (8S/8D)	1500 (max) 1100 (min)	1000 (max) 600 (min)	600 (max); 200 (min)	200 for each round robin match win, +400 for a semifinal win, +500 for the final win.								
ATP World Tour Masters 1000 (96S)	1000	600	360	180	90	45	25	10	16	–	8	0
ATP World Tour Masters 1000 (56S/48S)	1000	600	360	180	90	45	10	–	25	–	16	0
ATP World Tour 500 (48S)	500	300	180	90	45	20	0	–	10	–	4	0
ATP World Tour 500 (32S)	500	300	180	90	45	0	–	–	20	–	10	0
ATP World Tour 250 (48S)	250	150	90	45	20	10	0	–	5	–	3	0
ATP World Tour 250 (32S/28S)	250	150	90	45	20	0	–	–	12	–	6	0

== Retirements ==
Following is a list of notable players (winners of a main tour title, and/or part of the ATP rankings top 100 [singles] or top 100 [doubles] for at least one week) who announced their retirement from professional tennis, became inactive (after not playing for more than 52 weeks), or were permanently banned from playing, during the 2018 season:

- Julien Benneteau (born 20 December 1981 in Bourg-en-Bresse, France) joined the professional tour in 2000 and reached a career-high of no. 25 in singles in November 2014. He reached the quarterfinals of the 2006 French Open and the semifinals of the 2014 Cincinnati Masters. He announced that the 2018 US Open would be his last tournament, but subsequently delayed his retirement.
- Daniele Bracciali (born 10 January 1978 in Arezzo, Italy) joined the professional tour in 1995 and reached a career-high of no. 49 in singles in May 2006 and no. 21 in doubles in June 2012. He won one singles and six doubles titles. In November 2018, Bracciali was banned from playing for life due to match fixing.
- Alejandro Falla (born 14 November 1983 in Cali, Colombia) joined the professional tour in 2000 and reached a career-high of no. 48 in singles. He won 11 Challengers and was also part of the Colombian Davis Cup team from 2001 to 2017. He reached the 4th round of the French Open in 2011.
- Sam Groth (born 19 October 1987 in Narrandera, Australia) joined the professional tour in 2006 and reached a career-high of no. 53 in singles and no. 24 in doubles. He won two doubles titles in 2014 and 2016. He was also part of the Australian Davis Cup team from 2014. Since 2012, he has been the fastest-serve world record holder. He announced that he would retire after the 2018 Australian Open.
- Tommy Haas (born 3 April 1978 in Hamburg, Germany) joined the professional tour in 1996 and reached a career-high of no. 2 in singles on 13 May 2002. He won the silver medal at the 2000 Summer Olympics, in addition to 15 singles titles. Having been inactive since his first round exit at the Austrian Open Kitzbühel in August 2017, Haas announced his retirement from professional tennis on 15 March 2018.
- (United States) Scott Lipsky (born 14 August 1981 in Merrick, New York, USA) joined the professional tour in 2003 and reached a career-high of no. 21 in doubles in 2013. He won 16 ATP doubles titles with six different partners. Together with Casey Dellacqua, he won the French Open Mixed Doubles event in 2011. He announced his retirement in June 2018. The 2018 French Open was his last tournament.
- (Australia) Marinko Matosevic (born 8 August 1985 in Jajce, SFR Yugoslavia (present-day Bosnia and Herzegovina)) joined the professional tour in 2003 and reached a career-high of no. 39 in singles in 2013. He has never won in any singles and doubles titles in ATP matches, he won 9 Challenger titles. Having not played since February, he decided to retire his career on 29 November 2018. The 2018 Indian Wells Challenger was his last tournament.
- Florian Mayer (born 5 October 1983 in Bayreuth, Germany) joined the professional tour in 2001 and reached a career-high of no. 18 in 2011. He won 2 ATP singles titles and reached two Grand Slam quarterfinals. He announced his immediate retirement following his first round defeat to Borna Ćorić at the 2018 US Open.
- Max Mirnyi (born 6 July 1977 in Minsk, Soviet Union (present-day Belarus)) joined the professional tour in 1996 and reached a career-high of no. 18 in singles and no. 1 in doubles in 2003. Having won 52 doubles titles, including six Grand Slam titles, Mirnyi announced his retirement from professional tennis on 29 November 2018.
- Gilles Müller (born 9 May 1983 in Luxembourg City, Luxembourg) joined the professional tour in 2001 and reached a career-high of no. 21 on 31 July 2017. He won 2 ATP singles titles and reached two Grand Slam quarterfinals. He announced that he would retire after the 2018 season, with his last match coming at the 2018 US Open.
- (Canada) Daniel Nestor (born 4 September 1972 in Belgrade, Yugoslavia (present-day Serbia)) joined the professional tour in 1991 and reached a career-high of no. 1 in doubles on 19 August 2002. He won 91 ATP doubles titles, including eight Grand Slam titles and a gold medal at the 2000 Summer Olympics with Sébastien Lareau. He announced that the 2018 Davis Cup would be his last tournament.
- André Sá (born 6 May 1977 in Belo Horizonte, Brazil) joined the professional tour in 1996 and reached a career-high of no. 55 in singles and no. 17 in doubles. He won 11 doubles titles and reached the quarterfinals or better at three of the four Grand Slams in doubles. He was also a quarterfinalist at the Wimbledon Championships singles event in 2002 and a semifinalist in the 2000 Davis Cup. He announced that the 2018 Brasil Open would be his last tournament.
- Adrian Ungur (born 22 January 1985 in Pitești, Romania) joined the professional tour in 2003 and reached a career-high of no. 79 in singles on 11 June 2012 and a career-high of no. 94 in doubles on 20 July 2015. He won 1 doubles title in 2015. He announced that the 2018 Sibiu Open would be his last tournament.
- Mikhail Youzhny (born 25 June 1982 in Moscow, Soviet Union (present-day Russia)) joined the professional tour in 1999 and reached a career-high of no. 8 in singles on 28 January 2008 and a career-high of no. 38 in doubles on 11 April 2011. He won 10 singles titles and 9 doubles titles. He announced that the 2018 St. Petersburg Open would be his last tournament.

== See also ==
- 2018 WTA Tour
- 2018 ATP Challenger Tour
- Association of Tennis Professionals
- International Tennis Federation
