= 2018 Rakuten Japan Open Tennis Championships =

- Date: 1–7 October
- Edition: 45th
- Category: ATP World Tour 500
- Draw: 32S/16D
- Surface: Hard / indoor
- Location: Tokyo, Japan
- Venue: Musashino Forest Sport Plaza

Champions

Singles
- (Russia) Daniil Medvedev

Doubles
- (Japan) Ben McLachlan / (Germany) Jan-Lennard Struff
- Japan Open

The 2018 Rakuten Japan Open Tennis Championships was a men's tennis tournament played on indoor hard courts. It was the 45th edition of the Japan Open, and part of the 500 Series of the 2018 ATP World Tour. It was held at the Musashino Forest Sport Plaza in Tokyo, Japan, from October 1 through October 7, 2018. Unseeded Daniil Medvedev, who entered the main draw as a qualifier, won the singles title.

== Finals ==
=== Singles ===
- (Russia) Daniil Medvedev defeated (Japan) Kei Nishikori 6–2, 6–4

=== Doubles ===
- (Japan) Ben McLachlan / (Germany) Jan-Lennard Struff defeated (South Africa) Raven Klaasen / (New Zealand) Michael Venus 6–4, 7–5

== Points and prize money ==
=== Point distribution ===
Event	W	F	SF	QF	Round of 16	Round of 32	Q	Q2	Q1
Singles	500	300	180	90	45	0	20	10	0
Doubles	500	300	180	90	0	—N/a	45	25	0

=== Prize money ===
Event	W	F	SF	QF	Round of 16	Round of 32	Q2	Q1
Singles	$384,120	$188,315	$94,755	$48,195	$25,025	$13,200	$2,920	$1,490
Doubles	$115,650	$65,620	$28,400	$14,580	$7,540	—N/a	—N/a	—N/a

== Singles main-draw entrants ==
=== Seeds ===
Country	Player	Rank^{1}	Seed
CRO	Marin Čilić	5	1
RSA	Kevin Anderson	9	2
JPN	Kei Nishikori	12	3
ARG	Diego Schwartzman	14	4
GRE	Stefanos Tsitsipas	15	5
CAN	Milos Raonic	20	6
KOR	Chung Hyeon	23	7
FRA	Richard Gasquet	25	8

- ^{1} Rankings are as of September 24, 2018.

=== Other entrants ===
The following players received wildcards into the singles main draw:

- (Japan) Taro Daniel
- (Japan) Yoshihito Nishioka
- (Japan) Yūichi Sugita

The following player received entry as a special exempt:

- (United States) Taylor Fritz

The following players received entry from the qualifying draw:

- (Slovakia) Martin Kližan
- (United States) Denis Kudla
- (Russia) Daniil Medvedev
- (Japan) Yosuke Watanuki

=== Withdrawals ===
Before the tournament

- (Belgium) David Goffin → replaced by (Australia) Matthew Ebden
- (France) Lucas Pouille → replaced by (Germany) Jan-Lennard Struff

== Doubles main-draw entrants ==
=== Seeds ===
Country	Player	Country	Player	Rank^{1}	Seed
FIN	Henri Kontinen	AUS	John Peers	15	1
GBR	Jamie Murray	BRA	Bruno Soares	23	2
RSA	Raven Klaasen	NZL	Michael Venus	34	3
JPN	Ben McLachlan	GER	Jan-Lennard Struff	50	4

- Rankings are as of September 24, 2018.

=== Other entrants ===
The following pairs received wildcards into the doubles main draw:

- (Japan) Yoshihito Nishioka / (Japan) Kaito Uesugi
- (United Kingdom) Joe Salisbury / (Japan) Yasutaka Uchiyama

The following pair received entry from the qualifying draw:

- (France) Fabrice Martin / (France) Gilles Simon
