= 2018 U.S. Men's Clay Court Championships =

- Date: April 9–15
- Edition: 117th
- Category: World Tour 250
- Draw: 28S / 16D
- Prize money: $557,050
- Surface: Clay / outdoor
- Location: Houston, TX, United States
- Venue: River Oaks Country Club

Champions

Singles
- (United States) Steve Johnson

Doubles
- (Belarus) Max Mirnyi / (Austria) Philipp Oswald
- U.S. Men's Clay Court Championships

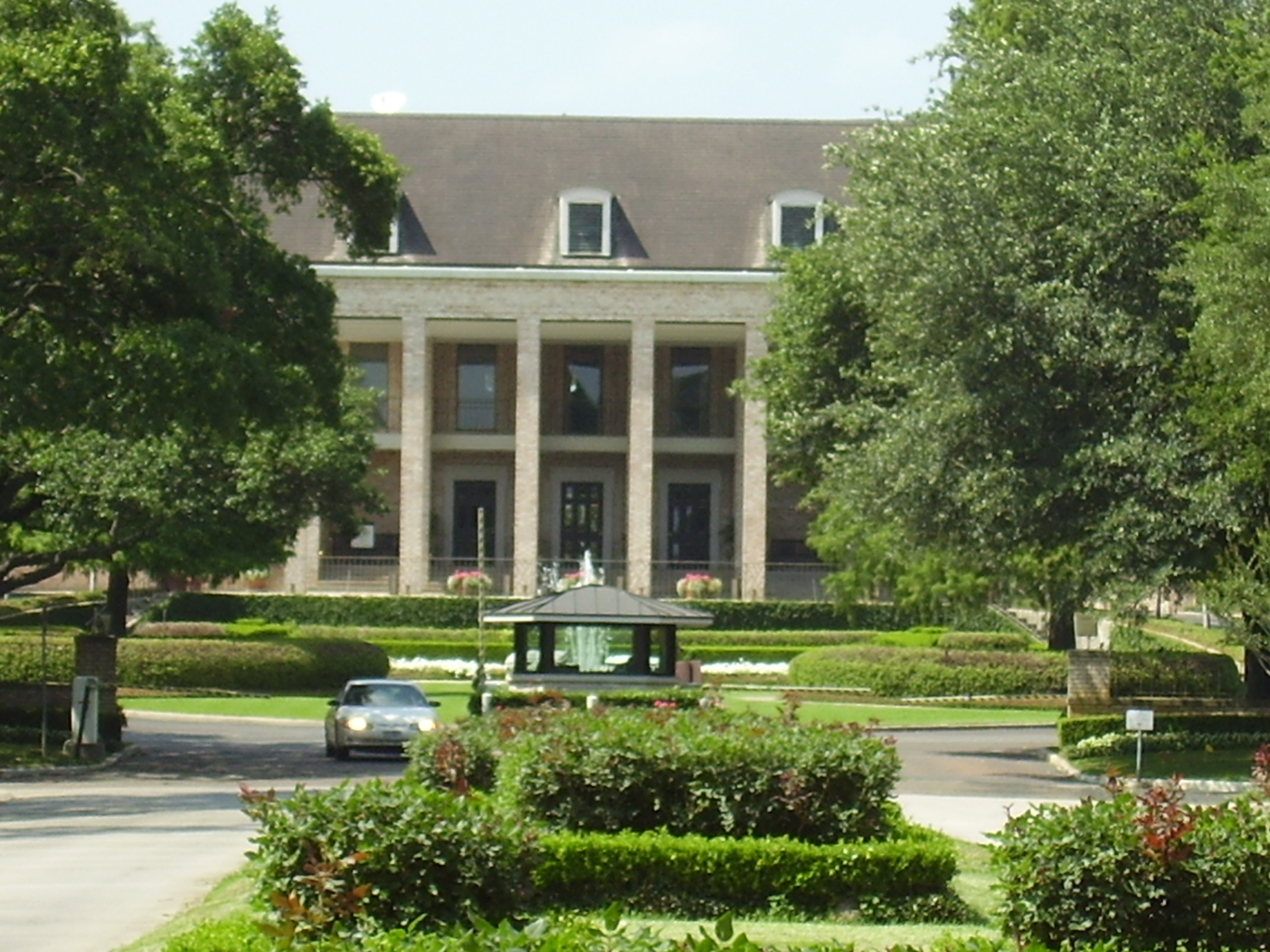
River Oaks Country Club

The 2018 U.S. Men's Clay Court Championships (also known as the Fayez Sarofim & Co. U.S. Men's Clay Court Championships for sponsorship purposes) was a tennis tournament played on outdoor clay courts. It was the 117th edition of the U.S. Men's Clay Court Championships, and an ATP World Tour 250 event on the 2018 ATP World Tour. It took place at River Oaks Country Club in Houston, Texas, United States, from April 9 through April 15, 2018. Sixth-seeded Steve Johnson won his second consecutive singles title at the event.

== Finals ==
=== Singles ===
(United States) Steve Johnson defeated (United States) Tennys Sandgren, 7–6^{(7–2)}, 2–6, 6–4

- It was Johnson's 1st singles title of the year and the 3rd of his career.

=== Doubles ===
(Belarus) Max Mirnyi / (Austria) Philipp Oswald defeated (Germany) Andre Begemann / (Croatia) Antonio Šančić, 6–7^{(2–7)}, 6–4, [11–9]

== Singles main draw entrants ==
=== Seeds ===
Country	Player	Rank^{1}	Seed
USA	John Isner	9	1
USA	Sam Querrey	14	2
USA	Jack Sock	16	3
AUS	Nick Kyrgios	24	4
ESP	Fernando Verdasco	36	5
USA	Steve Johnson	52	6
USA	Ryan Harrison	54	7
USA	Tennys Sandgren	56	8

- Rankings are as of April 2, 2018.

=== Other entrants ===
The following players received wildcards into the main draw:

- (Germany) Dustin Brown
- (Australia) Nick Kyrgios
- (United States) Mackenzie McDonald

The following players received entry via the qualifying draw:

- (Serbia) Miomir Kecmanović
- (United States) Stefan Kozlov
- (United States) Denis Kudla
- (Japan) Yoshihito Nishioka

=== Withdrawals ===
Before the tournament

- (South Africa) Kevin Anderson → replaced by (Slovenia) Blaž Kavčič
- (France) Jérémy Chardy → replaced by (Japan) Taro Daniel
- (South Korea) Chung Hyeon → replaced by (United States) Bjorn Fratangelo
- (Slovakia) Lukáš Lacko → replaced by (United States) Tim Smyczek
- (Spain) Feliciano López → replaced by (Switzerland) Henri Laaksonen
- (Australia) John Millman → replaced by (United States) Ernesto Escobedo

== Doubles main draw entrants ==
=== Seeds ===
Country	Player	Country	Player	Rank^{1}	Seed
USA	Bob Bryan	USA	Mike Bryan	18	1
USA	Ryan Harrison	JPN	Ben McLachlan	46	2
CHI	Julio Peralta	ARG	Horacio Zeballos	59	3
MEX	Santiago González	USA	Donald Young	86	4

- Rankings are as of April 2, 2018.

=== Other entrants ===
The following pairs received wildcards into the doubles main draw:

- (Germany) Dustin Brown / (United States) Frances Tiafoe
- (Croatia) Ivo Karlović / (Canada) Daniel Nestor
