= 2018 Rakuten Japan Open Tennis Championships – Singles =

Singles
- 2018 Rakuten Japan Open Tennis Championships

Final
- Champion: (Russia) Daniil Medvedev
- Runner-up: (Japan) Kei Nishikori
- Score: 6–2, 6–4

Details
- Draw: 32 (4Q / 3WC)
- Seeds: 8

Events
Singles	Doubles
← 2017 ·	Japan Open	· 2019 →

David Goffin was the defending champion, but withdrew before the competition began.

Daniil Medvedev won the title, defeating Kei Nishikori in the final, 6–2, 6–4.

== Seeds ==
1. (Croatia) Marin Čilić (first round)
2. (South Africa) Kevin Anderson (quarterfinals)
3. (Japan) Kei Nishikori (final)
4. (Argentina) Diego Schwartzman (first round)
5. (Greece) Stefanos Tsitsipas (quarterfinals)
6. (Canada) Milos Raonic (quarterfinals)
7. (South Korea) Chung Hyeon (first round)
8. (France) Richard Gasquet (semifinals)

== Draw ==
=== Key ===
- Q = Qualifier
- WC = Wild card
- LL = Lucky loser
- Alt = Alternate
- SE = Special exempt
- PR = Protected ranking
- ITF = ITF entry
- JE = Junior exempt
- w/o = Walkover
- r = Retired
- d = Defaulted
- SR = Special ranking

=== Finals ===
Semifinals
(Canada) Denis Shapovalov	3	3
Q	(Russia) Daniil Medvedev	6	6
3	(Japan) Kei Nishikori	7^{7}	6
8	(France) Richard Gasquet	6^{2}	1

Final
Q	(Russia) Daniil Medvedev	6	6
3	(Japan) Kei Nishikori	2	4

=== Top half ===
First round
1	(Croatia) M Čilić	6	4	6^{1}
(Germany) J-L Struff	3	6	7^{7}
(France) J Chardy	4	6	6
(Bosnia and Herzegovina) D Džumhur	6	3	3
(Switzerland) S Wawrinka	6	6
SE	(United States) T Fritz	3	4
(Canada) D Shapovalov	6	3	6
7	(South Korea) H Chung	3	6	2
4	(Argentina) D Schwartzman	4	4
Q	(Russia) D Medvedev	6	6
Q	(Slovakia) M Kližan	6	7^{7}
(United States) S Johnson	4	6^{4}
Q	(Japan) Y Watanuki	6^{7}	6	6
(Netherlands) R Haase	7^{9}	4	1
(France) A Mannarino	3	4
6	(Canada) M Raonic	6	6

Second round
(Germany) J-L Struff	7^{7}	6^{2}	6
(France) J Chardy	6^{3}	7^{7}	4
(Switzerland) S Wawrinka	6	1	4
(Canada) D Shapovalov	4	6	6
Q	(Russia) D Medvedev	6	6
Q	(Slovakia) M Kližan	4	3
Q	(Japan) Y Watanuki	3	6^{2}
6	(Canada) M Raonic	6	7^{7}

Quarterfinals
(Germany) J-L Struff	6	6^{7}	4
(Canada) D Shapovalov	4	7^{9}	6
Q	(Russia) D Medvedev	7^{7}	6
6	(Canada) M Raonic	6^{4}	3

Semifinals
(Canada) D Shapovalov	3	3
Q	(Russia) D Medvedev	6	6

=== Bottom half ===
First round
5	(Greece) S Tsitsipas	6	6
WC	(Japan) T Daniel	1	3
(France) G Simon	7^{7}	6^{5}	2
(Australia) A de Minaur	6^{1}	7^{7}	6
(France) B Paire	6	7^{7}
(Chile) N Jarry	4	6^{1}
WC	(Japan) Y Sugita	4	1
3	(Japan) K Nishikori	6	6
8	(France) R Gasquet	7^{10}	6
Q	(United States) D Kudla	6^{8}	3
(Australia) N Kyrgios	7	7^{7}
WC	(Japan) Y Nishioka	5	6^{3}
(Germany) M Marterer	5	4
(United States) F Tiafoe	7	6
(Australia) M Ebden	6	6^{1}	2
2	(South Africa) K Anderson	4	7^{7}	6

Second round
5	(Greece) S Tsitsipas	6	5	6
(Australia) A de Minaur	3	7	1
(France) B Paire	3	5
3	(Japan) K Nishikori	6	7
8	(France) R Gasquet	7^{7}	7^{7}
(Australia) N Kyrgios	6^{4}	6^{1}
(United States) F Tiafoe	3	6	2
2	(South Africa) K Anderson	6	3	6

Quarterfinals
5	(Greece) S Tsitsipas	3	3
3	(Japan) K Nishikori	6	6
8	(France) R Gasquet	7^{8}	7^{7}
2	(South Africa) K Anderson	6^{6}	6^{4}

Semifinals
3	(Japan) K Nishikori	7^{7}	6
8	(France) R Gasquet	6^{2}	1

== Qualifying ==
=== Seeds ===
1. (Russia) Daniil Medvedev (qualified)
2. (Slovakia) Martin Kližan (qualified)
3. (United States) Denis Kudla (qualified)
4. (United States) Mackenzie McDonald (first round)
5. (Romania) Marius Copil (first round)
6. (United States) Bradley Klahn (qualifying competition)
7. (Poland) Hubert Hurkacz (first round)
8. (United States) Tim Smyczek (first round)

=== Qualifiers ===
1. (Russia) Daniil Medvedev
2. (Slovakia) Martin Kližan
3. (United States) Denis Kudla
4. (Japan) Yosuke Watanuki

=== Qualifying draw ===
==== First qualifier ====
First round
1	(Russia) Daniil Medvedev	6	6
Alt	(Japan) Hiroki Moriya	3	3
PR	(Belarus) Egor Gerasimov	6	6
5	(Romania) Marius Copil	4	3

Qualifying competition
1	(Russia) Daniil Medvedev	6^{4}	6	6
PR	(Belarus) Egor Gerasimov	7^{7}	3	3

==== Second qualifier ====
First round
2	(Slovakia) Martin Kližan	6	6
(India) Prajnesh Gunneswaran	4	2
(Belgium) Ruben Bemelmans	6	3	6^{4}
6	(United States) Bradley Klahn	2	6	7^{7}

Qualifying competition
2	(Slovakia) Martin Kližan	6	6
6	(United States) Bradley Klahn	3	4

==== Third qualifier ====
First round
3	(United States) Denis Kudla	6	3	6
(Argentina) Horacio Zeballos	2	6	4
WC	(Japan) Yasutaka Uchiyama	6	6
7	(Poland) Hubert Hurkacz	2	2

Qualifying competition
3	(United States) Denis Kudla	6	1	6
WC	(Japan) Yasutaka Uchiyama	3	6	3

==== Fourth qualifier ====
First round
4	(United States) Mackenzie McDonald	4	6	3
WC	(Japan) Tatsuma Ito	6	1	6
WC	(Japan) Yosuke Watanuki	6	6
8	(United States) Tim Smyczek	4	2

Qualifying competition
WC	(Japan) Tatsuma Ito	2	4
WC	(Japan) Yosuke Watanuki	6	6
