= 2018 U.S. Men's Clay Court Championships – Singles =

Singles
- 2018 U.S. Men's Clay Court Championships

Final
- Champion: (United States) Steve Johnson
- Runner-up: (United States) Tennys Sandgren
- Score: 7–6^{(7–2)}, 2–6, 6–4

Details
- Draw: 28 (4 Q / 3 WC )
- Seeds: 8

Events
Singles	Doubles
- U.S. Men's Clay Court Championships

Steve Johnson was the defending champion and successfully defended his title, defeating Tennys Sandgren in the final, 7–6^{(7–2)}, 2–6, 6–4.

== Seeds ==
The top four seeds received a bye into the second round.

1. (United States) John Isner (quarterfinals)
2. (United States) Sam Querrey (second round)
3. (United States) Jack Sock (quarterfinals)
4. (Australia) Nick Kyrgios (quarterfinals)
5. (Spain) Fernando Verdasco (first round)
6. (United States) Steve Johnson (champion)
7. (United States) Ryan Harrison (second round)
8. (United States) Tennys Sandgren (final)

== Draw ==
Key

- Q = Qualifier
- WC = Wild card
- LL = Lucky loser
- Alt = Alternate
- ITF = ITF entry
- PR = Protected ranking
- SR = Special ranking
- SE = Special exempt
- JE = Junior exempt
- JR = Junior Accelerator Programme entrant
- CO = College Accelerator Programme entrant
- NG = Next Gen Accelerator Program entrant
- w/o = Walkover
- r = Retired
- d = Defaulted

=== Finals ===
Semifinals
6	(United States) Steve Johnson	7	6^{4}	6
(United States) Taylor Fritz	5	7^{7}	2
(Croatia) Ivo Karlović	6^{2}	6^{4}
8	(United States) Tennys Sandgren	7^{7}	7^{7}

Final
6	(United States) Steve Johnson	7^{7}	2	6
8	(United States) Tennys Sandgren	6^{2}	6	4

=== Top half ===
First round
WC	(Germany) D Brown	4	3
(Switzerland) H Laaksonen	6	6
(United States) F Tiafoe	6	6
WC	(United States) M McDonald	3	3
(United States) E Escobedo	6	6^{5}	2
6	(United States) S Johnson	3	7^{7}	6
(Argentina) H Zeballos	6	6
Q	(Japan) Y Nishioka	1	2
(United States) T Smyczek	7^{7}	2	6^{6}
(United States) T Fritz	6^{3}	6	7^{8}
Q	(Serbia) M Kecmanović	4	3
7	(United States) R Harrison	6	6

Second round
1	(United States) J Isner	6	6
(Switzerland) H Laaksonen	4	2
(United States) F Tiafoe	3	4
6	(United States) S Johnson	6	6
3	(United States) J Sock	6	6
(Argentina) H Zeballos	4	4
(United States) T Fritz	3	6	6
7	(United States) R Harrison	6	0	3

Quarterfinals
1	(United States) J Isner	6^{4}	6	6^{5}
6	(United States) S Johnson	7^{7}	4	7^{7}
3	(United States) J Sock	3	6	4
(United States) T Fritz	6	3	6

Semifinals
6	(United States) S Johnson	7	6^{4}	6
(United States) T Fritz	5	7^{7}	2

=== Bottom half ===
First round
5	(Spain) F Verdasco	4	6^{4}
Q	(United States) D Kudla	6	7^{7}
(Japan) T Daniel	6^{5}	4
(Croatia) I Karlović	7^{7}	6
(United States) B Fratangelo	6	6
(Australia) J Thompson	1	1
8	(United States) T Sandgren	6	6
(Slovenia) B Kavčič	2	2
(Argentina) N Kicker	6	6
(United States) D Young	3	2
Q	(United States) S Kozlov	3	2
(Argentina) G Pella	6	6

Second round
Q	(United States) D Kudla	5	5
(Croatia) I Karlović	7	7
(United States) B Fratangelo	7^{7}	1	2
4/WC	(Australia) N Kyrgios	6^{2}	6	6
8	(United States) T Sandgren	6	7^{7}
(Argentina) N Kicker	2	6^{3}
(Argentina) G Pella	2	7^{7}	7^{7}
2	(United States) S Querrey	6	6^{4}	6^{3}

Quarterfinals
(Croatia) I Karlović	3	6	6
4/WC	(Australia) N Kyrgios	6	2	3
8	(United States) T Sandgren	4	7	6
(Argentina) G Pella	6	5	3

Semifinals
(Croatia) I Karlović	6^{2}	6^{4}
8	(United States) T Sandgren	7^{7}	7^{7}

== Qualifying ==
=== Seeds ===
1. (United Kingdom) Cameron Norrie (first round)
2. (United States) Denis Kudla (qualified)
3. (Brazil) Thomaz Bellucci (first round)
4. (United States) Michael Mmoh (first round)
5. (United States) Bradley Klahn (qualifying competition)
6. (United States) Dennis Novikov (qualifying competition)
7. (Australia) Akira Santillan (qualifying competition)
8. (Barbados) Darian King (first round)

=== Qualifiers ===
1. (Japan) Yoshihito Nishioka
2. (United States) Denis Kudla
3. (United States) Stefan Kozlov
4. (Serbia) Miomir Kecmanović

=== Qualifying draw ===
==== First qualifier ====
First round
1	(United Kingdom) Cameron Norrie	1	4
WC	(Japan) Yoshihito Nishioka	6	6
WC	(United States) Christopher Eubanks	6^{7}	6	6^{4}
5	(United States) Bradley Klahn	7^{9}	4	7^{7}

Qualifying competition
WC	(Japan) Yoshihito Nishioka	6	6
5	(United States) Bradley Klahn	2	0

==== Second qualifier ====
First round
2	(United States) Denis Kudla	6	6
(United States) Reilly Opelka	4	3
(United States) Mitchell Krueger	7	6
8	(Barbados) Darian King	5	3

Qualifying competition
2	(United States) Denis Kudla	6	7
(United States) Mitchell Krueger	3	5

==== Third qualifier ====
First round
3	(Brazil) Thomaz Bellucci	7^{7}	3	6^{5}
(United States) Stefan Kozlov	6^{3}	6	7^{7}
Alt	(Germany) Dominik Köpfer	4	3
7	(Australia) Akira Santillan	6	6

Qualifying competition
(United States) Stefan Kozlov	6	6
7	(Australia) Akira Santillan	2	0

==== Fourth qualifier ====
First round
4	(United States) Michael Mmoh	1	6^{4}
(Serbia) Miomir Kecmanović	6	7^{7}
(United States) Evan King	5	7^{7}	4
6	(United States) Dennis Novikov	7	6^{2}	6

Qualifying competition
(Serbia) Miomir Kecmanović	6	5	6
6	(United States) Dennis Novikov	4	7	3
