= 2018 U.S. Men's Clay Court Championships – Doubles =

Doubles
- 2018 U.S. Men's Clay Court Championships

Final
- Champions: (Belarus) Max Mirnyi (Austria) Philipp Oswald
- Runners-up: (Germany) Andre Begemann (Croatia) Antonio Šančić
- Score: 6–7^{(2–7)}, 6–4, [11–9]

Details
- Draw: 16
- Seeds: 4

Events
Singles	Doubles
- U.S. Men's Clay Court Championships

Julio Peralta and Horacio Zeballos were the defending champions, but lost in the first round to Max Mirnyi and Philipp Oswald.

Mirnyi and Oswald went on to win the title, defeating Andre Begemann and Antonio Šančić in the final, 6–7^{(2–7)}, 6–4, [11–9].

== Seeds ==
1. (United States) Bob Bryan / (United States) Mike Bryan (semifinals)
2. (United States) Ryan Harrison / (Japan) Ben McLachlan (first round)
3. (Chile) Julio Peralta / (Argentina) Horacio Zeballos (first round)
4. (Mexico) Santiago González / (United States) Donald Young (quarterfinals)

== Draw ==
Key

- Q = Qualifier
- WC = Wild card
- LL = Lucky loser
- Alt = Alternate
- ITF = ITF entry
- PR = Protected ranking
- SR = Special ranking
- SE = Special exempt
- JE = Junior exempt
- JR = Junior Accelerator Programme entrant
- CO = College Accelerator Programme entrant
- NG = Next Gen Accelerator Program entrant
- w/o = Walkover
- r = Retired
- d = Defaulted

=== Draw ===
First round
1	(United States) B Bryan (United States) M Bryan	6	6
PR	(Japan) T Daniel (Japan) Y Nishioka	1	1
(United Kingdom) K Skupski (United Kingdom) N Skupski	6	7^{7}
(France) F Martin (India) P Raja	1	6^{0}
3	(Chile) J Peralta (Argentina) H Zeballos	3	6^{0}
(Belarus) M Mirnyi (Austria) P Oswald	6	7^{7}
(United States) J Sock (United States) J Withrow	6	4	[6]
(United States) S Lipsky (United States) T Sandgren	2	6	[10]
(Germany) A Begemann (Croatia) A Šančić	6	6
(United States) N Monroe (Australia) J-P Smith	3	4
(Argentina) G Durán (Argentina) A Molteni	3	6	[1]
4	(Mexico) S González (United States) D Young	6	4	[10]
WC	(Croatia) I Karlović (Canada) D Nestor	7^{8}	6
(Australia) N Kyrgios (Australia) M Reid	6^{6}	4
WC	(Germany) D Brown (United States) F Tiafoe	6	7^{7}
2	(United States) R Harrison (Japan) B McLachlan	2	6^{4}

Quarterfinals
1	(United States) B Bryan (United States) M Bryan	4	6	[10]
(United Kingdom) K Skupski (United Kingdom) N Skupski	6	3	[6]
(Belarus) M Mirnyi (Austria) P Oswald	6^{4}	7^{7}	[11]
(United States) S Lipsky (United States) T Sandgren	7^{7}	6^{1}	[9]
(Germany) A Begemann (Croatia) A Šančić	7^{7}	6
4	(Mexico) S González (United States) D Young	6^{4}	2
WC	(Croatia) I Karlović (Canada) D Nestor	6^{5}	3
WC	(Germany) D Brown (United States) F Tiafoe	7^{7}	6

Semifinals
1	(United States) B Bryan (United States) M Bryan	4	6	[6]
(Belarus) M Mirnyi (Austria) P Oswald	6	2	[10]
(Germany) A Begemann (Croatia) A Šančić	6	3	[10]
WC	(Germany) D Brown (United States) F Tiafoe	3	6	[7]

Final
(Belarus) M Mirnyi (Austria) P Oswald	6^{2}	6	[11]
(Germany) A Begemann (Croatia) A Šančić	7^{7}	4	[9]
