= 2018 Roger Federer tennis season =

Statistics for Swiss tennis player

- Full name: Roger Federer
- Country: Switzerland
- Calendar prize money: $8,629,234

Singles
- Season record: 50–10
- Calendar titles: 4
- Year-end ranking: No. 3
- Ranking change from previous year: ▼1

Grand Slam & significant results
- Australian Open: W
- French Open: A
- Wimbledon: QF
- US Open: 4R
- Other tournaments
- Tour Finals: SF

Doubles
- Season record: 0–2
- Year-end ranking: Unranked

Mixed doubles
- Season record: 4–0

Roger Federer's 2018 tennis season officially began on 30 December 2017, with the start of the Hopman Cup, and ended on 17 November 2018, with a loss in the semifinals of the ATP Finals. He finished the year ranked No. 3 in the ATP rankings. This season saw Federer improving his career best start to a season at 17–0 (21–0 if including victories at the Hopman Cup). Federer won his twentieth major at the Australian Open and extended his then-record of weeks at World No. 1 to 310 weeks in this season.

== Year summary ==
=== Early hard court season ===
==== Hopman Cup ====
As in the 2017 edition, Roger Federer paired with Belinda Bencic to represent Switzerland at the Hopman Cup. In the group stage, Federer defeated Yūichi Sugita, Karen Khachanov and Jack Sock, from Japan, Russia and United States respectively, all in straight sets, to help Switzerland advance to the final. They proceeded to defeat Germany 2–1, with Federer beating Alexander Zverev in three sets before the mixed doubles decider, in which he and Bencic defeated the pairing of Zverev and Angelique Kerber. This was Federer's second and Switzerland's third Hopman Cup title overall.

==== Australian Open ====
Federer began his participation in the first major tournament of the year by defeating Aljaž Bedene in three sets in the first round. He proceeded to defeat Jan-Lennard Struff, Richard Gasquet, and Márton Fucsovics, all in straight sets, to reach the quarterfinals. There, he faced Tomáš Berdych, defeating him for the ninth straight time in three sets and advancing to the semifinals. With Chung Hyeon retiring mid-match, Federer reached a record 30th major final and his seventh at the Australian Open, before defeating Marin Čilić in a five-set match to win his 20th Grand Slam trophy, extending his own all-time record. This was his sixth Australian Open title, matching the record of Roy Emerson and Novak Djokovic for most tournament wins. At 36 years and 173 days, he became only the third man in the Open Era to win four Grand Slam championship trophies after turning 30 years old. This was the first time since the 2008 US Open when Federer was able to successfully defend a Grand Slam title, and overall marked a historic record 10th Grand Slam title defense.

==== Rotterdam Open ====
Federer was given a wild card to play the Rotterdam Open, where he defeated Ruben Bemelmans and Phillip Kohlschreiber in straight sets to advance to the quarterfinals. There, he defeated Robin Haase in three sets, which guaranteed him a return to No. 1 in the ATP rankings the following week. At 36 years and 195 days of age, he surpassed Andre Agassi to become the oldest ATP world No. 1 by more than three years and broke the ATP record for the longest period between two stints at world No. 1 with 5 years and 106 days having elapsed since he last held the No. 1 ranking on 4 November 2012, as well as the record for the longest timespan between the first and most recent dates that he has held the No. 1 ranking: 14 years and 17 days. In the semi-finals, he defeated Andreas Seppi in straight sets before beating Grigor Dimitrov in straight sets in the final to win his second title of the year and his third title in Rotterdam, tying him with Arthur Ashe for most titles at this event. This victory also marked Federer's 97th tour level title and a record 20th ATP Tour 500 level title.

==== Indian Wells Masters ====
Federer proceeded to play in the first Masters 1000 tournament of the year, the Indian Wells Masters, knowing that he needed to reach the semifinals in order to keep his world No. 1 ranking. He received a first round bye and was victorious over Federico Delbonis and Filip Krajinović in rounds two and three. He then proceeded to defeat Jérémy Chardy in the fourth round and Chung Hyeon in the quarterfinals to reach the semifinals, thus retaining his world No. 1 ranking. With a close semifinal victory over Borna Ćorić in three sets, Federer compiled a career-best 17–0 start to his season. However, in the final, he fell to Juan Martín del Potro in a close three set match, despite having three match points on his own serve.

==== Miami Open ====
Federer entered the Miami Open as the defending champion, knowing that he needed to reach the quarterfinals in order to preserve his world No. 1 ranking. However, after receiving a first round bye, he was upset by Australian qualifier Thanasi Kokkinakis in the second round. At world No. 175, Kokkinakis was the lowest ranked player to defeat a world No. 1 since Francisco Clavet defeated Lleyton Hewitt at the same tournament in 2003. With this loss, he lost the world No. 1 ranking back to Rafael Nadal.

Federer then announced that he would skip the entire clay court season, including the French Open, for the second consecutive year. Despite this, he spent one more week as world No. 1 – the week of 14 May 2018 – as a result of Nadal's quarterfinal loss in the Madrid Open. Nadal went on to regain the ATP rankings' top position the following week, by winning the Italian Open.

=== Grass court season ===
==== Stuttgart Open ====
Federer returned to the ATP tour to play the Stuttgart Open, which marks the beginning of the grass court season. He entered having won his last 12 matches in a row and 30 sets in a row on grass. After a bye in the first round, he proceeded to defeat Mischa Zverev in three sets to advance to the quarterfinals, ending his streak of 30 consecutive sets won on grass. In the quarterfinals, he defeated Guido Pella in straight sets. He advanced to the final with a three-set victory over Nick Kyrgios, thereby reclaiming the ATP No. 1 ranking from Rafael Nadal in the following week, and defeated Milos Raonic in straight sets to win the Stuttgart Open for the first time and the 98th title of his career. This extended his grass court winning streak to 16.

==== Halle Open ====
Federer advanced to the Halle Open, bidding for a tournament-record tenth title. He defeated Aljaž Bedene in straight sets in the first round, setting up a second round match against Benoît Paire which he won in a third set tiebreak after saving two match points. He defeated Matthew Ebden in the quarterfinals and qualifier Denis Kudla in the semifinals, both in straight sets, to reach the final. He faced Borna Ćorić in the final, but lost in three sets despite having a set point in the first set. This loss also meant that he dropped to world No. 2 after one week on top of the rankings. Nevertheless, the match saw an improvement in form from Federer, after a difficult run to the final. This ended a 20 match win streak on grass courts.

==== Wimbledon ====
Federer moved on to play the Wimbledon Championships, looking to defend his 2017 title. He was seeded first in a Grand Slam for the first time since the 2012 US Open. During his first-round match, Federer walked onto Centre Court wearing Uniqlo sportswear, officially ending his 20-year relationship with Nike and confirming the rumoured ten-year $300 million contract with the Japanese clothing company. He went on to defeat Dušan Lajović, Lukáš Lacko, Jan-Lennard Struff and Adrian Mannarino, all in straight sets, to reach the quarterfinals. In the quarterfinals, he surprisingly lost to Kevin Anderson in a long five-setter (lasting 4 hours and 14 minutes), with a result of 11–13 in the fifth set, despite having led by two sets to love and having held a match point in the third set, ending a streak of 34 sets won in a row at Wimbledon.

=== North American hard court season ===
==== Cincinnati Masters ====
On July 23, Federer announced the withdrawal from his previously scheduled Canadian Open, citing his career longevity strategy. This way, he began the North American hard court season in the Cincinnati Masters. He started his campaign by defeating Peter Gojowczyk and Leonardo Mayer in straight sets, setting up a clash with countryman Stan Wawrinka in the quarterfinals. He defeated Wawrinka in three sets, advancing to the semifinals to face David Goffin. Federer won the first set and Goffin was forced to retire in the second set with a shoulder injury. This set up a final between Federer and Novak Djokovic, which Federer lost in straight sets, adding the 46th chapter to their storied rivalry approximately two and a half years after their last meeting.

==== US Open ====
Federer moved on to play the US Open, the season's last major, as the No. 2 seed. He did not drop a set in the opening three rounds, defeating Yoshihito Nishioka, Benoît Paire and Nick Kyrgios in the first three rounds. However, Federer proceeded to lose in the fourth round against John Millman in four sets, having missed set points in the second and third sets before losing a fourth-set tiebreak. He committed 77 unforced errors, including 10 double faults, and only hit 49% of first serves in what was widely regarded as one of the worst serving performances of his career. However, Federer assured the number of points needed to qualify for the ATP Finals for the sixteenth time in his career.

=== Asian swing ===
==== Shanghai Masters ====
Federer started the Asian swing by playing the Shanghai Masters, the eighth Masters 1000 tournament of the season. Due to the absence of his rival Rafael Nadal, the No. 1 player in the ATP rankings, he was the first seed. As a top-eight seed, he earned a first round bye. In the second round, he defeated Daniil Medvedev in three sets, advancing to the third round, where he defeated Roberto Bautista Agut – also in three sets. In the quarterfinals he encountered No. 8 seed Kei Nishikori, defeating him in straight sets and advancing to a semifinal clash with the No. 13 seed, Borna Ćorić. It was their third meeting of the season, with one victory for each in the previous two. Federer ended up losing to Ćorić in straight sets and dropped to No. 3 in the ATP rankings at the following week.

=== European indoor hard court season ===
==== Swiss Indoors ====
Federer then moved on to play his home tournament, the Swiss Indoors, in Basel, as the defending champion. In an interview, Federer shared that he had sustained a hand injury in training prior to the grass court season that had caused severe pain in his forearm. He stated that this injury significantly hindered his play, particularly his forehand, from the Stuttgart Open until the US Open. In the first two rounds of the tournament, Federer defeated Filip Krajinović and Jan-Lennard Struff, in three and two sets respectively, advancing to the quarterfinals. There, he defeated Gilles Simon in a tough three-set match, reaching his 200th career semifinal. Federer then bested Daniil Medvedev and Marius Copil in straight sets in the semifinal and final respectively, claiming a record-extending ninth Basel title and the 99th title of his career.

==== Paris Masters ====
At the beginning of the season, Federer had not expected to play the Paris Masters – the last Masters 1000 tournament of the year. However, he was featured in the draw as the No. 3 seed and later confirmed his presence in the tournament. After getting a bye in the first round, he was supposed to face Milos Raonic in the second round. However, Raonic was forced to withdraw from the tournament due to an elbow injury. Federer then advanced to the third round, where he defeated No. 13 seed Fabio Fognini in straight sets to set a quarterfinal clash with Kei Nishikori. In the quarterfinals he defeated Nishikori, also in straight sets, to set a semifinal match with Novak Djokovic, who was on a 21-match winning streak. In their 47th encounter, Federer lost to the red-hot Serb in three very close sets, despite having a set point in the first set.

==== ATP Finals ====
Having qualified for the ATP Finals, Federer was drawn in the group Lleyton Hewitt with Kevin Anderson, Dominic Thiem and Kei Nishikori. In his first match, he lost in straight sets to Nishikori for his ninth defeat of the season. He then defeated Thiem and Anderson, both in straight sets, to ultimately win the group and secure a semifinal place in the tournament. However, in his fifteenth tournament semifinal, Federer lost in straight sets to eventual champion Alexander Zverev to finish the season.

== All matches ==
This table chronicles all the matches of Roger Federer in 2018, including walkovers (W/O) which the ATP does not count as wins.

Key
W	F	SF	QF	#R	RR	Q#	P#	DNQ	A	Z#	PO	G	S	B	NMS	NTI	P	NH

(W) winner; (F) finalist; (SF) semifinalist; (QF) quarterfinalist; (#R) rounds 4, 3, 2, 1; (RR) round-robin stage; (Q#) qualification round; (P#) preliminary round; (DNQ) did not qualify; (A) absent; (Z#) Davis/Fed Cup Zonal Group (with number indication) or (PO) play-off; (G) gold, (S) silver or (B) bronze Olympic/Paralympic medal; (NMS) not a Masters tournament; (NTI) not a Tier I tournament; (P) postponed; (NH) not held; (SR) strike rate (events won / competed); (W–L) win–loss record.

=== Singles matches ===
Tournament	Match	Round	Opponent (seed or key)	Rank	Result	Score
Australian Open; Melbourne, Australia; Grand Slam tournament Hard, outdoor 15 – 28 January 2018
Australian Open; Melbourne, Australia; Grand Slam tournament Hard, outdoor 15 – 28 January 2018	1 / 1385	1R	(Slovenia) Aljaž Bedene	51	Win	6–3, 6–4, 6–3
Australian Open; Melbourne, Australia; Grand Slam tournament Hard, outdoor 15 – 28 January 2018	2 / 1386	2R	(Germany) Jan-Lennard Struff	55	Win	6–4, 6–4, 7–6^{(7–4)}
Australian Open; Melbourne, Australia; Grand Slam tournament Hard, outdoor 15 – 28 January 2018	3 / 1387	3R	(France) Richard Gasquet (29)	31	Win	6–2, 7–5, 6–4
Australian Open; Melbourne, Australia; Grand Slam tournament Hard, outdoor 15 – 28 January 2018	4 / 1388	4R	(Hungary) Márton Fucsovics	80	Win	6–4, 7–6^{(7–3)}, 6–2
Australian Open; Melbourne, Australia; Grand Slam tournament Hard, outdoor 15 – 28 January 2018	5 / 1389	QF	(Czech Republic) Tomáš Berdych (19)	20	Win	7–6^{(7–1)}, 6–3, 6–4
Australian Open; Melbourne, Australia; Grand Slam tournament Hard, outdoor 15 – 28 January 2018	6 / 1390	SF	(South Korea) Chung Hyeon	58	Win	6–1, 5–2 ret.
Australian Open; Melbourne, Australia; Grand Slam tournament Hard, outdoor 15 – 28 January 2018	7 / 1391	W	(Croatia) Marin Čilić (6)	6	Win (1)	6–2, 6–7^{(5–7)}, 6–3, 3–6, 6–1
Rotterdam Open; Rotterdam, Netherlands; ATP 500; Hard, indoor 12 – 18 February 2018
Rotterdam Open; Rotterdam, Netherlands; ATP 500; Hard, indoor 12 – 18 February 2018	8 / 1392	1R	(Belgium) Ruben Bemelmans (Q)	116	Win	6–1, 6–2
Rotterdam Open; Rotterdam, Netherlands; ATP 500; Hard, indoor 12 – 18 February 2018	9 / 1393	2R	(Germany) Philipp Kohlschreiber	36	Win	7–6^{(10–8)}, 7–5
Rotterdam Open; Rotterdam, Netherlands; ATP 500; Hard, indoor 12 – 18 February 2018	10 / 1394	QF	(Netherlands) Robin Haase	42	Win	4–6, 6–1, 6–1
Rotterdam Open; Rotterdam, Netherlands; ATP 500; Hard, indoor 12 – 18 February 2018	11 / 1395	SF	(Italy) Andreas Seppi (LL)	81	Win	6–3, 7–6^{(7–3)}
Rotterdam Open; Rotterdam, Netherlands; ATP 500; Hard, indoor 12 – 18 February 2018	12 / 1396	W	(Bulgaria) Grigor Dimitrov (2)	5	Win (2)	6–2, 6–2
Indian Wells Masters; Indian Wells, United States; ATP 1000; Hard, outdoor 5 – 18 March 2018
Indian Wells Masters; Indian Wells, United States; ATP 1000; Hard, outdoor 5 – 18 March 2018	–	1R	Bye			
Indian Wells Masters; Indian Wells, United States; ATP 1000; Hard, outdoor 5 – 18 March 2018	13 / 1397	2R	(Argentina) Federico Delbonis	67	Win	6–3, 7–6^{(8–6)}
Indian Wells Masters; Indian Wells, United States; ATP 1000; Hard, outdoor 5 – 18 March 2018	14 / 1398	3R	(Serbia) Filip Krajinović (25)	28	Win	6–2, 6–1
Indian Wells Masters; Indian Wells, United States; ATP 1000; Hard, outdoor 5 – 18 March 2018	15 / 1399	4R	(France) Jérémy Chardy	100	Win	7–5, 6–4
Indian Wells Masters; Indian Wells, United States; ATP 1000; Hard, outdoor 5 – 18 March 2018	16 / 1400	QF	(South Korea) Chung Hyeon (23)	26	Win	7–5, 6–1
Indian Wells Masters; Indian Wells, United States; ATP 1000; Hard, outdoor 5 – 18 March 2018	17 / 1401	SF	(Croatia) Borna Ćorić	49	Win	5–7, 6–4, 6–4
Indian Wells Masters; Indian Wells, United States; ATP 1000; Hard, outdoor 5 – 18 March 2018	18 / 1402	F	(Argentina) Juan Martín del Potro (6)	8	Loss (1)	4–6, 7–6^{(10–8)}, 6–7^{(2–7)}
Miami Open; Miami, United States; ATP 1000; Hard, outdoor 19 March – 1 April 2018
Miami Open; Miami, United States; ATP 1000; Hard, outdoor 19 March – 1 April 2018	–	1R	Bye			
Miami Open; Miami, United States; ATP 1000; Hard, outdoor 19 March – 1 April 2018	19 / 1403	2R	(Australia) Thanasi Kokkinakis (Q)	175	Loss	6–3, 3–6, 6–7^{(4–7)}
Stuttgart Open; Stuttgart, Germany; ATP 250; Grass, outdoor 11 – 17 June 2018
Stuttgart Open; Stuttgart, Germany; ATP 250; Grass, outdoor 11 – 17 June 2018	–	1R	Bye			
Stuttgart Open; Stuttgart, Germany; ATP 250; Grass, outdoor 11 – 17 June 2018	20 / 1404	2R	(Germany) Mischa Zverev	54	Win	3–6, 6–4, 6–2
Stuttgart Open; Stuttgart, Germany; ATP 250; Grass, outdoor 11 – 17 June 2018	21 / 1405	QF	(Argentina) Guido Pella	75	Win	6–4, 6–4
Stuttgart Open; Stuttgart, Germany; ATP 250; Grass, outdoor 11 – 17 June 2018	22 / 1406	SF	(Australia) Nick Kyrgios (4)	24	Win	6–7^{(2–7)}, 6–2, 7–6^{(7–5)}
Stuttgart Open; Stuttgart, Germany; ATP 250; Grass, outdoor 11 – 17 June 2018	23 / 1407	W	(Canada) Milos Raonic (7)	35	Win (3)	6–4, 7–6^{(7–3)}
Halle Open; Halle, Germany; ATP 500; Grass, outdoor 18 – 24 June 2018
Halle Open; Halle, Germany; ATP 500; Grass, outdoor 18 – 24 June 2018	24 / 1408	1R	(Slovenia) Aljaž Bedene	72	Win	6–3, 6–4
Halle Open; Halle, Germany; ATP 500; Grass, outdoor 18 – 24 June 2018	25 / 1409	2R	(France) Benoît Paire	48	Win	6–3, 3–6, 7–6^{(9–7)}
Halle Open; Halle, Germany; ATP 500; Grass, outdoor 18 – 24 June 2018	26 / 1410	QF	(Australia) Matthew Ebden (SE)	60	Win	7–6^{(7–2)}, 7–5
Halle Open; Halle, Germany; ATP 500; Grass, outdoor 18 – 24 June 2018	27 / 1411	SF	(United States) Denis Kudla (Q)	109	Win	7–6^{(7–1)}, 7–5
Halle Open; Halle, Germany; ATP 500; Grass, outdoor 18 – 24 June 2018	28 / 1412	F	(Croatia) Borna Ćorić	34	Loss (2)	6–7^{(6–8)}, 6–3, 2–6
Wimbledon Championships; London, United Kingdom; Grand Slam tournament Grass, outdoor 2 – 15 July 2018
Wimbledon Championships; London, United Kingdom; Grand Slam tournament Grass, outdoor 2 – 15 July 2018	29 / 1413	1R	(Serbia) Dušan Lajović	58	Win	6–1, 6–3, 6–4
Wimbledon Championships; London, United Kingdom; Grand Slam tournament Grass, outdoor 2 – 15 July 2018	30 / 1414	2R	(Slovakia) Lukáš Lacko	73	Win	6–4, 6–4, 6–1
Wimbledon Championships; London, United Kingdom; Grand Slam tournament Grass, outdoor 2 – 15 July 2018	31 / 1415	3R	(Germany) Jan-Lennard Struff	64	Win	6–3, 7–5, 6–2
Wimbledon Championships; London, United Kingdom; Grand Slam tournament Grass, outdoor 2 – 15 July 2018	32 / 1416	4R	(France) Adrian Mannarino (22)	26	Win	6–0, 7–5, 6–4
Wimbledon Championships; London, United Kingdom; Grand Slam tournament Grass, outdoor 2 – 15 July 2018	33 / 1417	QF	(South Africa) Kevin Anderson (8)	8	Loss	6–2, 7–6^{(7–5)}, 5–7, 4–6, 11–13
Cincinnati Masters; Cincinnati, United States; ATP 1000; Hard, outdoor 12 – 19 August 2018
Cincinnati Masters; Cincinnati, United States; ATP 1000; Hard, outdoor 12 – 19 August 2018	–	1R	Bye			
Cincinnati Masters; Cincinnati, United States; ATP 1000; Hard, outdoor 12 – 19 August 2018	34 / 1418	2R	(Germany) Peter Gojowczyk	47	Win	6–4, 6–4
Cincinnati Masters; Cincinnati, United States; ATP 1000; Hard, outdoor 12 – 19 August 2018	35 / 1419	3R	(Argentina) Leonardo Mayer	50	Win	6–1, 7–6^{(8–6)}
Cincinnati Masters; Cincinnati, United States; ATP 1000; Hard, outdoor 12 – 19 August 2018	36 / 1420	QF	(Switzerland) Stan Wawrinka (WC)	151	Win	6–7^{(2–7)}, 7–6^{(8–6)}, 6–2
Cincinnati Masters; Cincinnati, United States; ATP 1000; Hard, outdoor 12 – 19 August 2018	37 / 1421	SF	(Belgium) David Goffin (11)	11	Win	7–6^{(7–3)}, 1–1 ret.
Cincinnati Masters; Cincinnati, United States; ATP 1000; Hard, outdoor 12 – 19 August 2018	38 / 1422	F	(Serbia) Novak Djokovic (10)	10	Loss (3)	4–6, 4–6
US Open; New York City, United States; Grand Slam tournament Hard, outdoor 27 August – 9 September 2018
US Open; New York City, United States; Grand Slam tournament Hard, outdoor 27 August – 9 September 2018	39 / 1423	1R	(Japan) Yoshihito Nishioka (PR)	177	Win	6–2, 6–2, 6–4
US Open; New York City, United States; Grand Slam tournament Hard, outdoor 27 August – 9 September 2018	40 / 1424	2R	(France) Benoît Paire	56	Win	7–5, 6–4, 6–4
US Open; New York City, United States; Grand Slam tournament Hard, outdoor 27 August – 9 September 2018	41 / 1425	3R	(Australia) Nick Kyrgios (30)	30	Win	6–4, 6–1, 7–5
US Open; New York City, United States; Grand Slam tournament Hard, outdoor 27 August – 9 September 2018	42 / 1426	4R	(Australia) John Millman	55	Loss	6–3, 5–7, 6–7^{(7–9)}, 6–7^{(3–7)}
Laver Cup; Chicago, United States; Laver Cup; Hard, indoor 21 – 23 September 2018
Laver Cup; Chicago, United States; Laver Cup; Hard, indoor 21 – 23 September 2018	43 / 1427	Day 2	(Australia) Nick Kyrgios	27	Win	6–3, 6–2
Laver Cup; Chicago, United States; Laver Cup; Hard, indoor 21 – 23 September 2018	44 / 1428	Day 3	(United States) John Isner	10	Win	6–7^{(5–7)}, 7–6^{(8–6)}, [10–7]
Shanghai Masters; Shanghai, China; ATP 1000; Hard, outdoor 7 – 14 October 2018
Shanghai Masters; Shanghai, China; ATP 1000; Hard, outdoor 7 – 14 October 2018	–	1R	Bye			
Shanghai Masters; Shanghai, China; ATP 1000; Hard, outdoor 7 – 14 October 2018	45 / 1429	2R	(Russia) Daniil Medvedev	22	Win	6–4, 4–6, 6–4
Shanghai Masters; Shanghai, China; ATP 1000; Hard, outdoor 7 – 14 October 2018	46 / 1430	3R	(Spain) Roberto Bautista Agut	28	Win	6–3, 2–6, 6–4
Shanghai Masters; Shanghai, China; ATP 1000; Hard, outdoor 7 – 14 October 2018	47 / 1431	QF	(Japan) Kei Nishikori (8)	12	Win	6–4, 7–6^{(7–4)}
Shanghai Masters; Shanghai, China; ATP 1000; Hard, outdoor 7 – 14 October 2018	48 / 1432	SF	(Croatia) Borna Ćorić (13)	19	Loss	4–6, 4–6
Swiss Indoors; Basel, Switzerland; ATP 500; Hard, indoor 22 – 28 October 2018
Swiss Indoors; Basel, Switzerland; ATP 500; Hard, indoor 22 – 28 October 2018	49 / 1433	1R	(Serbia) Filip Krajinović	34	Win	6–2, 4–6, 6–4
Swiss Indoors; Basel, Switzerland; ATP 500; Hard, indoor 22 – 28 October 2018	50 / 1434	2R	(Germany) Jan-Lennard Struff	52	Win	6–3, 7–5
Swiss Indoors; Basel, Switzerland; ATP 500; Hard, indoor 22 – 28 October 2018	51 / 1435	QF	(France) Gilles Simon	32	Win	7–6^{(7–1)}, 4–6, 6–4
Swiss Indoors; Basel, Switzerland; ATP 500; Hard, indoor 22 – 28 October 2018	52 / 1436	SF	(Russia) Daniil Medvedev (7)	20	Win	6–1, 6–4
Swiss Indoors; Basel, Switzerland; ATP 500; Hard, indoor 22 – 28 October 2018	53 / 1437	W	(Romania) Marius Copil (Q)	93	Win (4)	7–6^{(7–5)}, 6–4
Paris Masters; Paris, France; ATP 1000; Hard, indoor 29 October – 4 November 2018
Paris Masters; Paris, France; ATP 1000; Hard, indoor 29 October – 4 November 2018	–	1R	Bye			
Paris Masters; Paris, France; ATP 1000; Hard, indoor 29 October – 4 November 2018	–	2R	(Canada) Milos Raonic	21	Walkover	N/A
Paris Masters; Paris, France; ATP 1000; Hard, indoor 29 October – 4 November 2018	54 / 1438	3R	(Italy) Fabio Fognini (13)	14	Win	6–4, 6–3
Paris Masters; Paris, France; ATP 1000; Hard, indoor 29 October – 4 November 2018	55 / 1439	QF	(Japan) Kei Nishikori (10)	11	Win	6–4, 6–4
Paris Masters; Paris, France; ATP 1000; Hard, indoor 29 October – 4 November 2018	56 / 1440	SF	(Serbia) Novak Djokovic (2)	2	Loss	6–7^{(6–8)}, 7–5, 6–7^{(3–7)}
ATP Finals; London, United Kingdom; ATP Finals; Hard, indoor 11 – 18 November 2018
ATP Finals; London, United Kingdom; ATP Finals; Hard, indoor 11 – 18 November 2018	57 / 1441	RR	(Japan) Kei Nishikori (7)	9	Loss	6–7^{(4–7)}, 3–6
ATP Finals; London, United Kingdom; ATP Finals; Hard, indoor 11 – 18 November 2018	58 / 1442	RR	(Austria) Dominic Thiem (6)	8	Win	6–2, 6–3
ATP Finals; London, United Kingdom; ATP Finals; Hard, indoor 11 – 18 November 2018	59 / 1443	RR	(South Africa) Kevin Anderson (4)	6	Win	6–4, 6–3
ATP Finals; London, United Kingdom; ATP Finals; Hard, indoor 11 – 18 November 2018	60 / 1444	SF	(Germany) Alexander Zverev (3)	5	Loss	5–7, 6–7^{(5–7)}

=== Doubles matches ===
Tournament	Match	Round	Opponents (seed or key)	Ranks	Result	Score
Laver Cup; Chicago, United States; Laver Cup; Hard, indoor 21 – 23 September 2018; Partner: (Serbia) Novak Djokovic (Day 1) (Germany) Alexander Zverev (Day 3)
Laver Cup; Chicago, United States; Laver Cup; Hard, indoor 21 – 23 September 2018; Partner: (Serbia) Novak Djokovic (Day 1) (Germany) Alexander Zverev (Day 3)	1 / 220	Day 1	(South Africa) Kevin Anderson / (United States) Jack Sock	241 / 2	Loss	7–6^{(7–5)}, 3–6, [6–10]
Laver Cup; Chicago, United States; Laver Cup; Hard, indoor 21 – 23 September 2018; Partner: (Serbia) Novak Djokovic (Day 1) (Germany) Alexander Zverev (Day 3)	2 / 221	Day 3	(United States) John Isner / (United States) Jack Sock	55 / 2	Loss	6–4, 6–7^{(2–7)}, [9–11]

=== Hopman Cup matches ===
==== Singles ====
Tournament	Match	Round	Opponent (seed or key)	Rank	Result	Score
Hopman Cup; Perth, Australia; Hopman Cup; Hard, indoor 30 December 2017 – 6 January 2018
Hopman Cup; Perth, Australia; Hopman Cup; Hard, indoor 30 December 2017 – 6 January 2018	1 / 21	RR	(Japan) Yūichi Sugita	40	Win	6–4, 6–3
Hopman Cup; Perth, Australia; Hopman Cup; Hard, indoor 30 December 2017 – 6 January 2018	3 / 23	RR	(Russia) Karen Khachanov	45	Win	6–3, 7–6^{(10–8)}
Hopman Cup; Perth, Australia; Hopman Cup; Hard, indoor 30 December 2017 – 6 January 2018	5 / 25	RR	(United States) Jack Sock	8	Win	7–6^{(7–5)}, 7–5
Hopman Cup; Perth, Australia; Hopman Cup; Hard, indoor 30 December 2017 – 6 January 2018	7 / 27	W	(Germany) Alexander Zverev	4	Win	6–7^{(4–7)}, 6–0, 6–2

==== Mixed doubles ====
Tournament	Match	Round	Opponents (seed or key)	Ranks	Result	Score
Hopman Cup; Perth, Australia; Hopman Cup; Hard, indoor 30 December 2017 – 6 January 2018; Partner: (Switzerland) Belinda Bencic
Hopman Cup; Perth, Australia; Hopman Cup; Hard, indoor 30 December 2017 – 6 January 2018; Partner: (Switzerland) Belinda Bencic	2 / 22	RR	(Japan) Naomi Osaka / (Japan) Yūichi Sugita	– / –	Win	2–4, 4–1, 4–3^{(5–1)}
Hopman Cup; Perth, Australia; Hopman Cup; Hard, indoor 30 December 2017 – 6 January 2018; Partner: (Switzerland) Belinda Bencic	4 / 24	RR	(Russia) Anastasia Pavlyuchenkova / (Russia) Karen Khachanov	– / –	Win	4–3^{(5–1)}, 3–4^{(3–5)}, 4–1
Hopman Cup; Perth, Australia; Hopman Cup; Hard, indoor 30 December 2017 – 6 January 2018; Partner: (Switzerland) Belinda Bencic	6 / 26	RR	(United States) CoCo Vandeweghe / (United States) Jack Sock	– / –	Win	4–3^{(5–3)}, 4–2
Hopman Cup; Perth, Australia; Hopman Cup; Hard, indoor 30 December 2017 – 6 January 2018; Partner: (Switzerland) Belinda Bencic	8 / 28	W	(Germany) Angelique Kerber / (Germany) Alexander Zverev	– / –	Win	4–3^{(5–3)}, 4–2

== Exhibition matches ==
=== Singles ===
Tournament	Match	Round	Opponent (seed or key)	Rank	Result	Score
Match for Africa 5 San Jose, United States; Exhibition; Hard, indoor 5 March 2018
Match for Africa 5 San Jose, United States; Exhibition; Hard, indoor 5 March 2018	2	–	(United States) Jack Sock	10	Win	7–6^{(11–9)}, 6–4

=== Doubles ===
Tournament	Match	Round	Opponents (seed or key)	Ranks	Result	Score
Match for Africa 5 San Jose, United States; Exhibition; Hard, indoor 5 March 2018; Partner: (United States) Bill Gates
Match for Africa 5 San Jose, United States; Exhibition; Hard, indoor 5 March 2018; Partner: (United States) Bill Gates	1	–	(United States) Savannah Guthrie / (United States) Jack Sock	– / –	Win	6–3

== Schedule ==
=== Singles schedule ===
Date	Tournament	Location	Category	Surface	Prev. result	Prev. points	New points	Result
15 January 2018– 28 January 2018	Australian Open	Melbourne (AUS)	Grand Slam	Hard	W	2000	2000	Champion (defeated Marin Čilić, 6–2, 6–7^{(5–7)}, 6–3, 3–6, 6–1)
12 February 2018– 18 February 2018	Rotterdam Open	Rotterdam (NED)	500 Series	Hard (i)	A	N/A	500	Champion (defeated Grigor Dimitrov, 6–2, 6–2)
5 March 2018– 18 March 2018	Indian Wells Masters	Indian Wells (USA)	Masters 1000	Hard	W	1000	600	Final (lost to Juan Martín del Potro, 4–6, 7–6^{(10–8)}, 6–7^{(2–7)})
19 March 2018– 1 April 2018	Miami Open	Miami (USA)	Masters 1000	Hard	W	1000	10	Second round (lost to Thanasi Kokkinakis, 6–3, 3–6, 6–7^{(4–7)})
11 June 2018– 17 June 2018	Stuttgart Open	Stuttgart (GER)	250 Series	Grass	2R	0	250	Champion (defeated Milos Raonic, 6–4, 7–6^{(7–3)})
18 June 2018– 24 June 2018	Halle Open	Halle (GER)	500 Series	Grass	W	500	300	Final (lost to Borna Ćorić, 6–7^{(6–8)}, 6–3, 2–6)
2 July 2018– 15 July 2018	Wimbledon	London (GBR)	Grand Slam	Grass	W	2000	360	Quarterfinals (lost to Kevin Anderson, 6–2, 7–6^{(7–5)}, 5–7, 4–6, 11–13)
12 August 2018– 19 August 2018	Cincinnati Masters	Cincinnati (USA)	Masters 1000	Hard	A	N/A	600	Final (lost to Novak Djokovic, 4–6, 4–6)
27 August 2018– 9 September 2018	US Open	New York (USA)	Grand Slam	Hard	QF	360	180	Fourth round (lost to John Millman, 6–3, 5–7, 6–7^{(7–9)}, 6–7^{(3–7)})
21 September 2018– 23 September 2018	Laver Cup	Chicago (USA)	Laver Cup	Hard (i)	W	N/A	N/A	Europe defeated World, 13–8
7 October 2018– 14 October 2018	Shanghai Masters	Shanghai (CHN)	Masters 1000	Hard	W	1000	360	Semifinals (lost to Borna Ćorić, 4–6, 4–6)
22 October 2018– 28 October 2018	Swiss Indoors	Basel (SUI)	500 Series	Hard (i)	W	500	500	Champion (defeated Marius Copil, 7–6^{(7–5)}, 6–4)
29 October 2018– 4 November 2018	Paris Masters	Paris (FRA)	Masters 1000	Hard (i)	A	N/A	360	Semifinals (lost to Novak Djokovic, 6–7^{(6–8)}, 7–5, 6–7^{(3–7)})
11 November 2018– 18 November 2018	ATP Finals	London (GBR)	Tour Finals	Hard (i)	SF	600	400	Semifinals (lost to Alexander Zverev, 5–7, 6–7^{(5–7)})
Total year-end points						9605	6420	▼3185 difference

=== Doubles schedule ===
Date	Tournament	Location	Category	Surface	Prev. result	Prev. points	New points	Result
21 September 2018– 23 September 2018	Laver Cup	Chicago (USA)	Laver Cup	Hard (i)	W	N/A	N/A	Europe defeated World, 13–8
Total year-end points						0	0	0 difference

== Yearly records ==
=== Head-to-head matchups ===
==== ATP and Grand Slam sanctioned matches ====
Roger Federer has a 50–10 ATP match win–loss record in the 2018 season. His record against players who were part of the ATP rankings Top Ten at the time of their meetings is 5–6. Bold indicates player was ranked top 10 at time of at least one meeting. The following list is ordered by number of wins:

- (Australia) Nick Kyrgios 3–0
- (Germany) Jan-Lennard Struff 3–0
- (Slovenia) Aljaž Bedene 2–0
- (South Korea) Chung Hyeon 2–0
- (Serbia) Filip Krajinović 2–0
- (Russia) Daniil Medvedev 2–0
- (France) Benoît Paire 2–0
- **(Japan) Kei Nishikori** 2–1
- (Spain) Roberto Bautista Agut 1–0
- (Belgium) Ruben Bemelmans 1–0
- (Czech Republic) Tomáš Berdych 1–0
- (France) Jérémy Chardy 1–0
- (Romania) Marius Copil 1–0
- **(Croatia) Marin Čilić** 1–0
- (Argentina) Federico Delbonis 1–0
- **(Bulgaria) Grigor Dimitrov** 1–0
- (Australia) Matthew Ebden 1–0
- (Italy) Fabio Fognini 1–0
- (Hungary) Márton Fucsovics 1–0
- (France) Richard Gasquet 1–0
- (Belgium) David Goffin 1–0
- (Germany) Peter Gojowczyk 1–0
- (Netherlands) Robin Haase 1–0
- **(United States) John Isner** 1–0
- (Germany) Philipp Kohlschreiber 1–0
- (United States) Denis Kudla 1–0
- (Slovakia) Lukáš Lacko 1–0
- (Serbia) Dušan Lajović 1–0
- (France) Adrian Mannarino 1–0
- (Argentina) Leonardo Mayer 1–0
- (Japan) Yoshihito Nishioka 1–0
- (Argentina) Guido Pella 1–0
- (Canada) Milos Raonic 1–0
- (Italy) Andreas Seppi 1–0
- (France) Gilles Simon 1–0
- **(Austria) Dominic Thiem** 1–0
- (Switzerland) Stan Wawrinka 1–0
- (Germany) Mischa Zverev 1–0
- **(South Africa) Kevin Anderson** 1–1
- (Croatia) Borna Ćorić 1–2
- **(Argentina) Juan Martín del Potro** 0–1
- (Australia) Thanasi Kokkinakis 0–1
- (Australia) John Millman 0–1
- **(Germany) Alexander Zverev** 0–1
- **(Serbia) Novak Djokovic** 0–2

==== ITF sanctioned matches ====
His official ITF sanctioned season record for 2018 is 54–10. While these are official sanctioned matches per the ITF, the ATP does not count them in their totals. Bold indicates player was ranked top 10 at time of at least one meeting. The extra ITF matches are as follows:

- (Russia) Karen Khachanov 1–0
- (United States) **Jack Sock** 1–0
- (Japan) Yūichi Sugita 1–0
- (Germany) **Alexander Zverev** 1–0

=== Finals ===
==== Singles: 7 (4 titles, 3 runner-ups) ====
Category Grand Slam (1–0) ATP Finals (0–0) ATP World Tour Masters 1000 (0–2) ATP World Tour 500 (2–1) ATP World Tour 250 (1–0)	Titles by surface Hard (3–2) Clay (0–0) Grass (1–1)	Titles by setting Outdoor (2–3) Indoor (2–0)

Result	W–L	Date	Tournament	Tier	Surface	Opponent	Score
Win	1–0	Jan 2018	Australian Open, Australia (6)	Grand Slam	Hard	(Croatia) Marin Čilić	6–2, 6–7^{(5–7)}, 6–3, 3–6, 6–1
Win	2–0	Feb 2018	Rotterdam Open, Netherlands (3)	500 Series	Hard (i)	(Bulgaria) Grigor Dimitrov	6–2, 6–2
Loss	2–1	Mar 2018	Indian Wells Masters, United States	Masters 1000	Hard	(Argentina) Juan Martín del Potro	4–6, 7–6^{(10–8)}, 6–7^{(2–7)}
Win	3–1	Jun 2018	Stuttgart Open, Germany	250 Series	Grass	(Canada) Milos Raonic	6–4, 7–6^{(7–3)}
Loss	3–2	Jun 2018	Halle Open, Germany	500 Series	Grass	(Croatia) Borna Ćorić	6–7^{(6–8)}, 6–3, 2–6
Loss	3–3	Aug 2018	Cincinnati Masters, United States	Masters 1000	Hard	(Serbia) Novak Djokovic	4–6, 4–6
Win	4–3	Oct 2018	Swiss Indoors, Switzerland (9)	500 Series	Hard (i)	(Romania) Marius Copil	7–6^{(7–5)}, 6–4

==== Team competitions: 2 (2 titles) ====
Result	W–L	Date	Tournament	Tier	Surface	Partner(s)	Opponents	Score
Win	1–0	Jan 2018	Hopman Cup, Australia (2)	Hopman Cup	Hard (i)	(Switzerland) Belinda Bencic	(Germany) Angelique Kerber (Germany) Alexander Zverev	2–1
Win	2–0	Sep 2018	Laver Cup, United States (2)	Laver Cup	Hard (i)	(Serbia) Novak Djokovic (Germany) Alexander Zverev (Bulgaria) Grigor Dimitrov (Belgium) David Goffin (United Kingdom) Kyle Edmund	(South Africa) Kevin Anderson (United States) John Isner (Argentina) Diego Schwartzman (United States) Jack Sock (Australia) Nick Kyrgios (United States) Frances Tiafoe	13–8

=== Earnings ===
- **Bold** font denotes tournament win

Event	Prize money	Year-to-date
**Australian Open**	A$4,000,000	$3,164,800
**Rotterdam Open**	€401,580	$3,656,655
Indian Wells Masters	$654,860	$4,311,515
Miami Open	$25,465	$4,336,980
**Stuttgart Open**	€117,030	$4,474,689
Halle Open	€209,630	$4,717,464
Wimbledon	£281,000	$5,088,440
Cincinnati Masters	$533,690	$5,622,130
US Open	$266,000	$5,888,130
Shanghai Masters	$335,750	$6,223,880
**Swiss Indoors**	€427,765	$6,716,366
Paris Masters	€240,235	$6,990,234
ATP Finals	$609,000	$7,599,234
Bonus pool	$1,030,000	$8,629,234
		$8,629,234

Figures in United States dollars (USD) unless noted.

=== Awards ===
- ATPWorldTour.com Fans' Favourite
  - Record sixteenth consecutive award in career

== See also ==
- 2018 ATP World Tour
- 2018 Rafael Nadal tennis season
- 2018 Novak Djokovic tennis season
- 2018 Juan Martín del Potro tennis season
