= 2017 Swiss Indoors – Singles =

Singles
- 2017 Swiss Indoors

Final
- Champion: (Switzerland) Roger Federer
- Runner-up: (Argentina) Juan Martin del Potro
- Score: 6–7^{(5–7)}, 6–4, 6–3

Details
- Draw: 32 (4 Q / 3 WC )
- Seeds: 8

Events
Singles	Doubles
← 2016 ·	Swiss Indoors	· 2018 →

Roger Federer defeated Juan Martín del Potro in the final, 6–7^{(5–7)}, 6–4, 6–3 to win the singles tennis title at the 2017 Swiss Indoors. It was his eighth Swiss Indoors and 95th singles title, surpassing Ivan Lendl for second place in the list for most men's singles titles won in the Open era.

Marin Čilić was the defending champion, but lost in the semifinals to del Potro.

== Seeds ==
1. (Switzerland) Roger Federer (champion)
2. (Croatia) Marin Čilić (semifinals)
3. (Belgium) David Goffin (semifinals)
4. (Argentina) Juan Martín del Potro (final)
5. (United States) Jack Sock (quarterfinals)
6. (Spain) Roberto Bautista Agut (quarterfinals)
7. (France) Adrian Mannarino (quarterfinals)
8. (Germany) Mischa Zverev (first round)

== Draw ==
=== Key ===
- Q = Qualifier
- WC = Wild card
- LL = Lucky loser
- Alt = Alternate
- SE = Special exempt
- PR = Protected ranking
- ITF = ITF entry
- JE = Junior exempt
- w/o = Walkover
- r = Retired
- d = Defaulted
- SR = Special ranking

=== Finals ===
Semifinals
1	(Switzerland) Roger Federer	6	6
3	(Belgium) David Goffin	1	2
4	(Argentina) Juan Martín del Potro	6	6
2	(Croatia) Marin Čilić	4	4

Final
1	(Switzerland) Roger Federer	6^{5}	6	6
4	(Argentina) Juan Martín del Potro	7^{7}	4	3

=== Top half ===
First round
1	(Switzerland) R Federer	6	6
WC	(United States) F Tiafoe	1	3
(France) B Paire	6	7^{7}
(United States) S Johnson	3	6^{4}
(Japan) Y Sugita	6	2	6^{3}
(Canada) D Shapovalov	4	6	7^{7}
SE	(Belgium) R Bemelmans	6^{0}	6	1
7	(France) A Mannarino	7^{7}	4	6
3	(Belgium) D Goffin	6	7
Q	(Germany) P Gojowczyk	2	5
(South Korea) H Chung	6	6
(Italy) P Lorenzi	3	1
WC	(Switzerland) M Chiudinelli	2	6^{3}
(Netherlands) R Haase	6	7^{7}
LL	(Canada) V Pospisil	6	6^{7}	5
5	(United States) J Sock	3	7^{9}	7

Second round
1	(Switzerland) R Federer	6	6
(France) B Paire	1	3
(Canada) D Shapovalov	6	1	2
7	(France) A Mannarino	4	6	6
3	(Belgium) D Goffin	6	6
(South Korea) H Chung	4	1
(Netherlands) R Haase	4	6	4
5	(United States) J Sock	6	2	6

Quarterfinals
1	(Switzerland) R Federer	4	6	6
7	(France) A Mannarino	6	1	3
3	(Belgium) D Goffin	7^{8}	6
5	(United States) J Sock	6^{6}	3

Semifinals
1	(Switzerland) R Federer	6	6
3	(Belgium) D Goffin	1	2

=== Bottom half ===
First round
6	(Spain) R Bautista Agut	6	6
Q	(Kazakhstan) M Kukushkin	0	3
(Ukraine) A Dolgopolov	4	1
(United States) R Harrison	6	6
(United States) D Young	4	2
Q	(France) J Benneteau	6	6
(Portugal) J Sousa	1	6	1
4	(Argentina) JM del Potro	6	4	6
8	(Germany) M Zverev	5	5
(Argentina) L Mayer	7	7
Q	(Hungary) M Fucsovics	6	6
(United States) J Donaldson	0	1
(Croatia) B Ćorić	6^{8}	6	6
WC	(Switzerland) H Laaksonen	7^{10}	1	3
LL	(Germany) F Mayer	3	0^{r}
2	(Croatia) M Čilić	6	0

Second round
6	(Spain) R Bautista Agut	6	7^{7}
(United States) R Harrison	3	6^{1}
Q	(France) J Benneteau	4	4
4	(Argentina) JM del Potro	6	6
(Argentina) L Mayer	0^{r}
Q	(Hungary) M Fucsovics	3
(Croatia) B Ćorić	3	6	3
2	(Croatia) M Čilić	6	3	6

Quarterfinals
6	(Spain) R Bautista Agut	2	6	4
4	(Argentina) JM del Potro	6	2	6
Q	(Hungary) M Fucsovics	6^{3}	7	6^{4}
2	(Croatia) M Čilić	7^{7}	5	7^{7}

Semifinals
4	(Argentina) JM del Potro	6	6
2	(Croatia) M Čilić	4	4

== Qualifying ==
=== Seeds ===
1. (Uzbekistan) Denis Istomin (first round)
2. (Germany) Florian Mayer (qualifying competition, lucky loser)
3. (Germany) Peter Gojowczyk (qualified)
4. (Kazakhstan) Mikhail Kukushkin (qualified)
5. (France) Julien Benneteau (qualified)
6. (Hungary) Márton Fucsovics (qualified)
7. (Canada) Vasek Pospisil (qualifying competition, lucky loser)
8. (France) Nicolas Mahut (qualifying competition)

=== Qualifiers ===
1. (France) Julien Benneteau
2. (Hungary) Márton Fucsovics
3. (Germany) Peter Gojowczyk
4. (Kazakhstan) Mikhail Kukushkin

=== Lucky losers ===
1. (Canada) Vasek Pospisil
2. (Germany) Florian Mayer

=== Qualifying draw ===
==== First qualifier ====
First round
1	(Uzbekistan) Denis Istomin	6^{5}	1
(Spain) Marcel Granollers	7^{7}	6
(Canada) Félix Auger-Aliassime	4	3
5	(France) Julien Benneteau	6	6

Qualifying competition
(Spain) Marcel Granollers	4	4
5	(France) Julien Benneteau	6	6

==== Second qualifier ====
First round
2	(Germany) Florian Mayer	6	7
(United States) Ernesto Escobedo	4	5
Alt	(Croatia) Franko Škugor	7^{7}	4	4
6	(Hungary) Márton Fucsovics	6^{5}	6	6

Qualifying competition
2	(Germany) Florian Mayer	4	4
6	(Hungary) Márton Fucsovics	6	6

==== Third qualifier ====
First round
3	(Germany) Peter Gojowczyk	6^{3}	7	6
WC	(France) Paul-Henri Mathieu	7^{7}	5	4
WC	(Switzerland) Marc-Andrea Hüsler	5	1
8	(France) Nicolas Mahut	7	6

Qualifying competition
3	(Germany) Peter Gojowczyk	6	6
8	(France) Nicolas Mahut	1	3

==== Fourth qualifier ====
First round
4	(Kazakhstan) Mikhail Kukushkin	7	6
WC	(Switzerland) Adrian Bodmer	5	3
(France) Kenny de Schepper	6^{3}	4
7	(Canada) Vasek Pospisil	7^{7}	6

Qualifying competition
4	(Kazakhstan) Mikhail Kukushkin	6	6
7	(Canada) Vasek Pospisil	4	4
