= 2018 Juan Martín del Potro tennis season =

- Full name: Juan Martín del Potro
- Country: Argentina
- Calendar prize money: $5,917,766

Singles
- Season record: 47–13
- Calendar titles: 2
- Current ranking: No. 4
- Ranking change from previous year: ▲7

Grand Slam & significant results
- Australian Open: 3R
- French Open: SF
- Wimbledon: QF
- US Open: F

Doubles
- Season record: 1–2
- Current ranking: 331

The 2018 Juan Martín del Potro tennis season officially commenced on 10 January 2018 with the start of the Delray Beach Open. This season saw Del Potro slightly improve on his previous results as well as his playing style. Highlights from his season includes winning his 400th career match in Indian Wells, where he won the first Masters 1000 title of his career. After he was forced to retire due to a leg injury in the Italian Open, his participation in the French Open was apparently at risk. However, the Argentine managed to recover in time and entered the tournament as the fifth seed. There, he performed notably well considering the doubts surrounding his physical condition, and the fact that clay is not the best surface for his style of play. His run to the semi-finals ensured that, for the first time since February 2014, Delpo would return to his career-best ranking of world No. 4.

== All matches ==
This table chronicles all the matches of Juan Martín del Potro in 2018, including walkovers (W/O) which the ATP does not count as wins.

Key
W	F	SF	QF	#R	RR	Q#	P#	DNQ	A	Z#	PO	G	S	B	NMS	NTI	P	NH

(W) winner; (F) finalist; (SF) semifinalist; (QF) quarterfinalist; (#R) rounds 4, 3, 2, 1; (RR) round-robin stage; (Q#) qualification round; (P#) preliminary round; (DNQ) did not qualify; (A) absent; (Z#) Davis/Fed Cup Zonal Group (with number indication) or (PO) play-off; (G) gold, (S) silver or (B) bronze Olympic/Paralympic medal; (NMS) not a Masters tournament; (NTI) not a Tier I tournament; (P) postponed; (NH) not held; (SR) strike rate (events won / competed); (W–L) win–loss record.
To avoid confusion and double counting, these charts are updated at the conclusion of a tournament or when the player's participation has ended.

=== Singles matches ===
Tournament	Match	Round	Opponent (seed or key)	Rank	Result	Score
Auckland Open; Auckland, New Zealand; ATP 250; Hard, outdoor 8–13 January 2018
Auckland Open; Auckland, New Zealand; ATP 250; Hard, outdoor 8–13 January 2018	–	1R	Bye			
Auckland Open; Auckland, New Zealand; ATP 250; Hard, outdoor 8–13 January 2018	1 / 541	2R	(Canada) Denis Shapovalov	50	Win	6–2, 6–4
Auckland Open; Auckland, New Zealand; ATP 250; Hard, outdoor 8–13 January 2018	2 / 542	QF	(Russia) Karen Khachanov	47	Win	7–6^{(7–4)}, 6–3
Auckland Open; Auckland, New Zealand; ATP 250; Hard, outdoor 8–13 January 2018	3 / 543	SF	(Spain) David Ferrer (7)	38	Win	6–4, 6–4
Auckland Open; Auckland, New Zealand; ATP 250; Hard, outdoor 8–13 January 2018	4 / 544	F	(Spain) Roberto Bautista Agut (5)	21	Loss (1)	1–6, 6–4, 5–7
Australian Open; Melbourne, Australia; Grand Slam tournament Hard, outdoor 15–28 January 2018
Australian Open; Melbourne, Australia; Grand Slam tournament Hard, outdoor 15–28 January 2018	5 / 545	1R	(United States) Frances Tiafoe	81	Win	6–3, 6–4, 6–3
Australian Open; Melbourne, Australia; Grand Slam tournament Hard, outdoor 15–28 January 2018	6 / 546	2R	(Russia) Karen Khachanov	47	Win	6–4, 7–6^{(7–4)}, 6–7^{(0–7)}, 6–4
Australian Open; Melbourne, Australia; Grand Slam tournament Hard, outdoor 15–28 January 2018	7 / 547	3R	(Czech Republic) Tomáš Berdych (19)	20	Loss	3–6, 3–6, 2–6
Delray Beach Open; Delray Beach, United States; ATP 250; Hard, outdoor 19–25 February 2018
Delray Beach Open; Delray Beach, United States; ATP 250; Hard, outdoor 19–25 February 2018	8 / 548	1R	(France) Jérémy Chardy	96	Win	6–2, 6–4
Delray Beach Open; Delray Beach, United States; ATP 250; Hard, outdoor 19–25 February 2018	9 / 549	2R	(United States) Frances Tiafoe (WC)	91	Loss	6–7^{(6–8)}, 6–4, 5–7
Mexican Open; Acapulco, Mexico; ATP 500; Hard, outdoor 26 February – 3 March 2018
Mexican Open; Acapulco, Mexico; ATP 500; Hard, outdoor 26 February – 3 March 2018	10 / 550	1R	(Germany) Mischa Zverev	54	Win	6–1, 6–2
Mexican Open; Acapulco, Mexico; ATP 500; Hard, outdoor 26 February – 3 March 2018	11 / 551	2R	(Spain) David Ferrer	39	Win	6–4, 4–6, 6–3
Mexican Open; Acapulco, Mexico; ATP 500; Hard, outdoor 26 February – 3 March 2018	12 / 552	QF	(Austria) Dominic Thiem (3)	6	Win	6–2, 7–6^{(9–7)}
Mexican Open; Acapulco, Mexico; ATP 500; Hard, outdoor 26 February – 3 March 2018	13 / 553	SF	(Germany) Alexander Zverev (2)	5	Win	6–4, 6–2
Mexican Open; Acapulco, Mexico; ATP 500; Hard, outdoor 26 February – 3 March 2018	14 / 554	W	(South Africa) Kevin Anderson (5)	8	Win (1)	6–4, 6–4
Indian Wells Masters; Indian Wells, United States; ATP 1000; Hard, outdoor 5–18 March 2018
Indian Wells Masters; Indian Wells, United States; ATP 1000; Hard, outdoor 5–18 March 2018	–	1R	Bye			
Indian Wells Masters; Indian Wells, United States; ATP 1000; Hard, outdoor 5–18 March 2018	15 / 555	2R	(Australia) Alex de Minaur (WC)	141	Win	6–2, 6–1
Indian Wells Masters; Indian Wells, United States; ATP 1000; Hard, outdoor 5–18 March 2018	16 / 556	3R	(Spain) David Ferrer (29)	33	Win	6–4, 7–6^{(7–3)}
Indian Wells Masters; Indian Wells, United States; ATP 1000; Hard, outdoor 5–18 March 2018	17 / 557	4R	(Argentina) Leonardo Mayer	47	Win	3–6, 7–6^{(7–2)}, 6–3
Indian Wells Masters; Indian Wells, United States; ATP 1000; Hard, outdoor 5–18 March 2018	18 / 558	QF	(Germany) Philipp Kohlschreiber (31)	37	Win	3–6, 6–3, 6–4
Indian Wells Masters; Indian Wells, United States; ATP 1000; Hard, outdoor 5–18 March 2018	19 / 559	SF	(Canada) Milos Raonic (32)	38	Win	6–2, 6–3
Indian Wells Masters; Indian Wells, United States; ATP 1000; Hard, outdoor 5–18 March 2018	20 / 560	W	(Switzerland) Roger Federer (1)	1	Win (2)	6–4, 6–7^{(8–10)}, 7–6^{(7–2)}
Miami Open; Miami, United States; ATP 1000; Hard, outdoor 19 March – 1 April 2018
Miami Open; Miami, United States; ATP 1000; Hard, outdoor 19 March – 1 April 2018	–	1R	Bye			
Miami Open; Miami, United States; ATP 1000; Hard, outdoor 19 March – 1 April 2018	21 / 561	2R	(Netherlands) Robin Haase	44	Win	6–4, 5–7, 6–2
Miami Open; Miami, United States; ATP 1000; Hard, outdoor 19 March – 1 April 2018	22 / 562	3R	(Japan) Kei Nishikori (26)	33	Win	6–2, 6–2
Miami Open; Miami, United States; ATP 1000; Hard, outdoor 19 March – 1 April 2018	23 / 563	4R	(Serbia) Filip Krajinović (22)	27	Win	6–4, 6–2
Miami Open; Miami, United States; ATP 1000; Hard, outdoor 19 March – 1 April 2018	24 / 564	QF	(Canada) Milos Raonic (20)	25	Win	5–7, 7–6^{(7–1)}, 7–6^{(7–3)}
Miami Open; Miami, United States; ATP 1000; Hard, outdoor 19 March – 1 April 2018	25 / 565	SF	(United States) John Isner (14)	17	Loss	1–6, 6–7^{(2–7)}
Madrid Open; Madrid, Spain; ATP 1000; Clay, outdoor 7–13 May 2018
Madrid Open; Madrid, Spain; ATP 1000; Clay, outdoor 7–13 May 2018	–	1R	Bye			
Madrid Open; Madrid, Spain; ATP 1000; Clay, outdoor 7–13 May 2018	26 / 566	2R	(Bosnia and Herzegovina) Damir Džumhur	32	Win	6–3, 6–3
Madrid Open; Madrid, Spain; ATP 1000; Clay, outdoor 7–13 May 2018	27 / 567	3R	(Serbia) Dušan Lajović (Q)	95	Loss	6–3, 4–6, 6–7^{(6–8)}
Italian Open; Rome, Italy; ATP 1000; Clay, outdoor 14–20 May 2018
Italian Open; Rome, Italy; ATP 1000; Clay, outdoor 14–20 May 2018	–	1R	Bye			
Italian Open; Rome, Italy; ATP 1000; Clay, outdoor 14–20 May 2018	28 / 568	2R	(Greece) Stefanos Tsitsipas (Q)	43	Win	7–5, 6–3
Italian Open; Rome, Italy; ATP 1000; Clay, outdoor 14–20 May 2018	29 / 569	3R	(Belgium) David Goffin (9)	10	Loss	2–6, 5–4 ret.
French Open; Paris, France; Grand Slam tournament Clay, outdoor 28 May – 10 June 2018
French Open; Paris, France; Grand Slam tournament Clay, outdoor 28 May – 10 June 2018	30 / 570	1R	(France) Nicolas Mahut (WC)	116	Win	1–6, 6–1, 6–2, 6–4
French Open; Paris, France; Grand Slam tournament Clay, outdoor 28 May – 10 June 2018	31 / 571	2R	(France) Julien Benneteau	62	Win	6–4, 6–3, 6–2
French Open; Paris, France; Grand Slam tournament Clay, outdoor 28 May – 10 June 2018	32 / 572	3R	(Spain) Albert Ramos Viñolas (31)	36	Win	7–5, 6–4, 6–1
French Open; Paris, France; Grand Slam tournament Clay, outdoor 28 May – 10 June 2018	33 / 573	4R	(United States) John Isner (9)	10	Win	6–4, 6–4, 6–4
French Open; Paris, France; Grand Slam tournament Clay, outdoor 28 May – 10 June 2018	34 / 574	QF	(Croatia) Marin Čilić (3)	4	Win	7–6^{(7–5)}, 5–7, 6–3, 7–5
French Open; Paris, France; Grand Slam tournament Clay, outdoor 28 May – 10 June 2018	35 / 575	SF	(Spain) Rafael Nadal (1)	1	Loss	4–6, 1–6, 2–6
Wimbledon Championships; London, United Kingdom; Grand Slam tournament Grass, outdoor 2–15 July 2018
Wimbledon Championships; London, United Kingdom; Grand Slam tournament Grass, outdoor 2–15 July 2018	36 / 576	1R	(Germany) Peter Gojowczyk	39	Win	6–3, 6–4, 6–3
Wimbledon Championships; London, United Kingdom; Grand Slam tournament Grass, outdoor 2–15 July 2018	37 / 577	2R	(Spain) Feliciano López	70	Win	6–4, 6–1, 6–2
Wimbledon Championships; London, United Kingdom; Grand Slam tournament Grass, outdoor 2–15 July 2018	38 / 578	3R	(France) Benoît Paire	47	Win	6–4, 7–6^{(7–4)}, 6–3
Wimbledon Championships; London, United Kingdom; Grand Slam tournament Grass, outdoor 2–15 July 2018	39 / 579	4R	(France) Gilles Simon	53	Win	7–6^{(7–1)}, 7–6^{(7–5)}, 5–7, 7–6^{(7–5)}
Wimbledon Championships; London, United Kingdom; Grand Slam tournament Grass, outdoor 2–15 July 2018	40 / 580	QF	(Spain) Rafael Nadal (2)	1	Loss	5–7, 7–6^{(9–7)}, 6–4, 4–6, 4–6
Los Cabos Open; Los Cabos, Mexico; ATP 250; Hard, outdoor 30 July – 5 August 2018
Los Cabos Open; Los Cabos, Mexico; ATP 250; Hard, outdoor 30 July – 5 August 2018	–	1R	Bye			
Los Cabos Open; Los Cabos, Mexico; ATP 250; Hard, outdoor 30 July – 5 August 2018	41 / 581	2R	(United States) Marcos Giron (Q)	446	Win	7–5, 6–3
Los Cabos Open; Los Cabos, Mexico; ATP 250; Hard, outdoor 30 July – 5 August 2018	42 / 582	QF	(Belarus) Egor Gerasimov (PR)	301	Win	6–1, 6–1
Los Cabos Open; Los Cabos, Mexico; ATP 250; Hard, outdoor 30 July – 5 August 2018	43 / 583	SF	(Bosnia and Herzegovina) Damir Džumhur (3)	24	Win	6–3, 7–6^{(8–6)}
Los Cabos Open; Los Cabos, Mexico; ATP 250; Hard, outdoor 30 July – 5 August 2018	44 / 584	F	(Italy) Fabio Fognini (2)	15	Loss (2)	4–6, 2–6
Canadian Open; Toronto, Canada; ATP 1000; Hard, outdoor 6–12 August 2018
Canadian Open; Toronto, Canada; ATP 1000; Hard, outdoor 6–12 August 2018	Withdrew					
Cincinnati Masters; Cincinnati, United States; ATP 1000; Hard, outdoor 13–19 August 2018
Cincinnati Masters; Cincinnati, United States; ATP 1000; Hard, outdoor 13–19 August 2018	–	1R	Bye			
Cincinnati Masters; Cincinnati, United States; ATP 1000; Hard, outdoor 13–19 August 2018	45 / 585	2R	(South Korea) Chung Hyeon	25	Win	6–2, 6–3
Cincinnati Masters; Cincinnati, United States; ATP 1000; Hard, outdoor 13–19 August 2018	46 / 586	3R	(Australia) Nick Kyrgios (15)	18	Win	7–6^{(7–4)}, 6–7^{(6–8)}, 6–2
Cincinnati Masters; Cincinnati, United States; ATP 1000; Hard, outdoor 13–19 August 2018	47 / 587	QF	(Belgium) David Goffin (11)	11	Loss	6–7^{(5–7)}, 6–7^{(4–7)}
US Open; New York City, United States; Grand Slam tournament Hard, outdoor 27 August – 9 September 2018
US Open; New York City, United States; Grand Slam tournament Hard, outdoor 27 August – 9 September 2018	48 / 588	1R	(United States) Donald Young (Q)	246	Win	6–0, 6–3, 6–4
US Open; New York City, United States; Grand Slam tournament Hard, outdoor 27 August – 9 September 2018	49 / 589	2R	(United States) Denis Kudla	72	Win	6–3, 6–1, 7–6^{(7–4)}
US Open; New York City, United States; Grand Slam tournament Hard, outdoor 27 August – 9 September 2018	50 / 590	3R	(Spain) Fernando Verdasco (31)	32	Win	7–5, 7–6^{(8–6)}, 6–3
US Open; New York City, United States; Grand Slam tournament Hard, outdoor 27 August – 9 September 2018	51 / 591	4R	(Croatia) Borna Ćorić (20)	20	Win	6–4, 6–3, 6–1
US Open; New York City, United States; Grand Slam tournament Hard, outdoor 27 August – 9 September 2018	52 / 592	QF	(United States) John Isner (11)	11	Win	6–7^{(5–7)}, 6–3, 7–6^{(7–4)}, 6–2
US Open; New York City, United States; Grand Slam tournament Hard, outdoor 27 August – 9 September 2018	53 / 593	SF	(Spain) Rafael Nadal (1)	1	Win	7–6^{(7–3)}, 6–2 ret.
US Open; New York City, United States; Grand Slam tournament Hard, outdoor 27 August – 9 September 2018	54 / 594	F	(Serbia) Novak Djokovic (6)	6	Loss (3)	3–6, 6–7^{(4–7)}, 3–6
China Open; Beijing, China; ATP 500; Hard, outdoor 1–7 October 2018
China Open; Beijing, China; ATP 500; Hard, outdoor 1–7 October 2018	55 / 595	1R	(Spain) Albert Ramos Viñolas	50	Win	7–5, 6–2
China Open; Beijing, China; ATP 500; Hard, outdoor 1–7 October 2018	56 / 596	2R	(Russia) Karen Khachanov	24	Win	6–4, 7–6^{(7–4)}
China Open; Beijing, China; ATP 500; Hard, outdoor 1–7 October 2018	57 / 597	QF	(Serbia) Filip Krajinović	36	Win	6–3, 6–0
China Open; Beijing, China; ATP 500; Hard, outdoor 1–7 October 2018	–	SF	(Italy) Fabio Fognini (4)	13	Walkover	N/A
China Open; Beijing, China; ATP 500; Hard, outdoor 1–7 October 2018	58 / 598	F	(Georgia (country)) Nikoloz Basilashvili	34	Loss (4)	4–6, 4–6
Shanghai Masters; Shanghai, China; ATP 1000; Hard, outdoor 7–14 October 2018
Shanghai Masters; Shanghai, China; ATP 1000; Hard, outdoor 7–14 October 2018	–	1R	Bye			
Shanghai Masters; Shanghai, China; ATP 1000; Hard, outdoor 7–14 October 2018	59 / 599	2R	(France) Richard Gasquet	25	Win	7–5, 7–6^{(9–7)}
Shanghai Masters; Shanghai, China; ATP 1000; Hard, outdoor 7–14 October 2018	60 / 600	3R	(Croatia) Borna Ćorić (13)	19	Loss	5–7 ret.

=== Doubles matches ===
Tournament	Match	Round	Opponents (seed or key)	Ranks	Result	Score
Indian Wells Masters; Indian Wells, United States; ATP 1000; Hard, outdoor 5–18 March 2018; Partner: (Bulgaria) Grigor Dimitrov
Indian Wells Masters; Indian Wells, United States; ATP 1000; Hard, outdoor 5–18 March 2018; Partner: (Bulgaria) Grigor Dimitrov	1 / 78	1R	(Spain) Feliciano López / (Spain) Marc López	26 / 23	Loss	4–6, 2–6
Madrid Open; Madrid, Spain; ATP 1000; Clay, outdoor 7–13 May 2018; Partner: (Austria) Dominic Thiem
Madrid Open; Madrid, Spain; ATP 1000; Clay, outdoor 7–13 May 2018; Partner: (Austria) Dominic Thiem	2 / 79	1R	(Uruguay) Pablo Cuevas / (Spain) Marcel Granollers	29 / 19	Loss	3–6, 6–7^{(8–10)}
Italian Open; Rome, Italy; ATP 1000; Clay, outdoor 14–20 May 2018; Partner: (Argentina) Leonardo Mayer
Italian Open; Rome, Italy; ATP 1000; Clay, outdoor 14–20 May 2018; Partner: (Argentina) Leonardo Mayer	3 / 80	1R	(Italy) Simone Bolelli / (Italy) Fabio Fognini	123 / 75	Win	6–4, 1–6, [11–9]
Italian Open; Rome, Italy; ATP 1000; Clay, outdoor 14–20 May 2018; Partner: (Argentina) Leonardo Mayer	4 / 81	2R	(Spain) Feliciano López / (Spain) Marc López	28 / 24	Withdrew	N/A

== Schedule ==
=== Singles schedule ===
Date	Tournament	Location	Category	Surface	Prev. result	Prev. points	New points	Result
8 January 2018– 13 January 2018	Auckland Open	Auckland (NZL)	250 Series	Hard	A	N/A	150	Final (lost to Roberto Bautista Agut, 1–6, 6–4, 5–7)
15 January 2018– 28 January 2018	Australian Open	Melbourne (AUS)	Grand Slam	Hard	A	N/A	90	Third round (lost to Tomáš Berdych, 3–6, 3–6, 2–6)
19 February 2018– 25 February 2018	Delray Beach Open	Delray Beach (USA)	250 Series	Hard	SF	90	20	Second round (lost to Frances Tiafoe, 6–7^{(6–8)}, 6–4, 5–7)
26 February 2018– 3 March 2018	Mexican Open	Acapulco (MEX)	500 Series	Hard	2R	45	500	Champion (defeated Kevin Anderson, 6–4, 6–4)
5 March 2018– 18 March 2018	Indian Wells Masters	Indian Wells (USA)	Masters 1000	Hard	3R	45	1000	Champion (defeated Roger Federer, 6–4, 6–7^{(8–10)}, 7–6^{(7–2)})
19 March 2018– 1 April 2018	Miami Open	Miami (USA)	Masters 1000	Hard	3R	45	360	Semifinals (lost to John Isner, 1–6 6–7^{(2–7)})
7 May 2018– 13 May 2018	Madrid Open	Madrid (ESP)	Masters 1000	Clay	A	N/A	90	Third round (lost to Dušan Lajović, 6–3, 4–6, 6–7^{(6–8)})
14 May 2018– 20 May 2018	Italian Open	Rome (ITA)	Masters 1000	Clay	QF	180	90	Third round (lost to David Goffin, 2–6, 5–4 ret.)
28 May 2018– 10 June 2018	French Open	Paris (FRA)	Grand Slam	Clay	3R	90	720	Semifinals (lost to Rafael Nadal, 4–6, 1–6, 2–6)
2 July 2018– 15 July 2018	Wimbledon	London (GBR)	Grand Slam	Grass	2R	45	360	Quarter-finals (lost to Rafael Nadal, 5–7, 7–6^{(9–7)}, 6–4, 4–6, 4–6)
30 July 2018– 5 August 2018	Los Cabos Open	Los Cabos (MEX)	250 Series	Hard	A	N/A	150	Final (lost to Fabio Fognini, 4–6, 2–6)
6 August 2018– 12 August 2018	Canadian Open	Toronto (CAN)	Masters 1000	Hard	2R	45	0	Withdrew due to left wrist injury
13 August 2018– 19 August 2018	Cincinnati Masters	Cincinnati (USA)	Masters 1000	Hard	3R	90	180	Quarter-finals (lost to David Goffin, 6–7^{(5–7)}, 6–7^{(4–7)})
27 August 2018– 9 September 2018	US Open	New York (USA)	Grand Slam	Hard	SF	720	1200	Final (lost to Novak Djokovic, 3–6, 6–7^{(4–7)}, 3–6)
1 October 2018– 7 October 2018	China Open	Beijing (CHN)	500 Series	Hard	2R	45	300	Final (lost to Nikoloz Basilashvili, 6–4, 6–4)
8 October 2018– 14 October 2018	Shanghai Masters	Shanghai (CHN)	Masters 1000	Hard	SF	360	90	Third round (lost to Borna Ćorić, 5–7 ret.)
22 October 2018– 28 October 2018	Swiss Indoors	Basel (SUI)	500 Series	Hard (i)	F	300	0	Withdrew due to right knee injury
11 November 2018– 18 November 2018	ATP Finals	London (GBR)	Tour Finals	Hard (i)	A	N/A	0	Withdrew due to fractured patella
Race to London points as of Shanghai Open						2350	5300	▲3500 difference
Total year-end points						2615		

=== Doubles schedule ===
Date	Championship	Location	Category	Surface	Prev. result	Prev. points	New points	Outcome
5 March 2018– 18 March 2018	Indian Wells Masters	Indian Wells (USA)	Masters 1000	Hard	1R	0	0	First round (lost to López / López, 4–6, 2–6)
7 May 2018– 13 May 2018	Madrid Open	Madrid (ESP)	Masters 1000	Clay	A	N/A	0	First round (lost to Cuevas / Granollers, 3–6, 6–7^{(8–10)})
14 May 2018– 20 May 2018	Italian Open	Rome (ITA)	Masters 1000	Clay	1R	0	90	Second round (withdrew to López / López)
Total year-end points						0	90	▲90 difference

== Yearly records ==
=== ATP and Grand Slam sanctioned matches ===
Juan Martín del Potro has a 47–13 ATP match win–loss record in the 2018 season. His record against players who were part of the ATP rankings Top Ten at the time of their meetings is 7–4. Bold indicates player was ranked top 10 at time of at least one meeting. The following list is ordered by number of wins:

- (Spain) David Ferrer 3–0
- (Russia) Karen Khachanov 3–0
- **(United States) John Isner** 2–1
- (Bosnia and Herzegovina) Damir Džumhur 2–0
- (Serbia) Filip Krajinović 2–0
- (Spain) Albert Ramos Viñolas 2–0
- (Canada) Milos Raonic 2–0
- (Croatia) Borna Ćorić 1–1
- (United States) Frances Tiafoe 1–1
- **(South Africa) Kevin Anderson** 1–0
- (France) Julien Benneteau 1–0
- (France) Jérémy Chardy 1–0
- **(Croatia) Marin Čilić** 1–0
- (Australia) Alex de Minaur 1–0
- **(Switzerland) Roger Federer** 1–0
- (France) Richard Gasquet 1–0
- (Belarus) Egor Gerasimov 1–0
- (United States) Marcos Giron 1–0
- (Germany) Peter Gojowczyk 1–0
- (Netherlands) Robin Haase 1–0
- (South Korea) Chung Hyeon 1–0
- (Germany) Philipp Kohlschreiber 1–0
- (United States) Denis Kudla 1–0
- (Australia) Nick Kyrgios 1–0
- (Spain) Feliciano López 1–0
- (France) Nicolas Mahut 1–0
- (Argentina) Leonardo Mayer 1–0
- (Croatia) Kei Nishikori 1–0
- (France) Benoît Paire 1–0
- (Canada) Denis Shapovalov 1–0
- (France) Gilles Simon 1–0
- **(Austria) Dominic Thiem** 1–0
- (Greece) Stefanos Tsitsipas 1–0
- (Spain) Fernando Verdasco 1–0
- (United States) Donald Young 1–0
- **(Germany) Alexander Zverev** 1–0
- (Germany) Mischa Zverev 1–0
- (Georgia (country)) Nikoloz Basilashvili 0–1
- (Spain) Roberto Bautista Agut 0–1
- (Czech Republic) Tomáš Berdych 0–1
- **(Serbia) Novak Djokovic** 0–1
- (Italy) Fabio Fognini 0–1
- (Serbia) Dušan Lajović 0–1
- **(Spain) Rafael Nadal** 1–2
- **(Belgium) David Goffin** 0–2

=== Finals ===
==== Singles: 6 (2 titles, 4 runner-up) ====
Category Grand Slam (0–1) ATP Finals (0–0) ATP World Tour Masters 1000 (1–0) ATP World Tour 500 (1–1) ATP World Tour 250 (0–2)	Titles by surface Hard (2–4) Clay (0–0) Grass (0–0)	Titles by setting Outdoor (2–4) Indoor (0–0)

Result	W–L	Date	Tournament	Tier	Surface	Opponent	Score
Loss	0–1	Jan 2018	Auckland Open, New Zealand	250 Series	Hard	(Spain) Roberto Bautista Agut	1–6, 6–4, 5–7
Win	1–1	Mar 2018	Mexican Open, Mexico	500 Series	Hard	(South Africa) Kevin Anderson	6–4, 6–4
Win	2–1	Mar 2018	Indian Wells Masters, United States	Masters 1000	Hard	(Switzerland) Roger Federer	6–4, 6–7^{(8–10)}, 7–6^{(7–2)}
Loss	2–2	Aug 2018	Los Cabos Open, Mexico	250 Series	Hard	(Italy) Fabio Fognini	4–6, 2–6
Loss	2–3	Aug 2018	US Open, United States	Grand Slam	Hard	(Serbia) Novak Djokovic	3–6, 6–7^{(4–7)}, 3–6
Loss	2–4	Oct 2018	China Open, China	500 Series	Hard	(Georgia (country)) Nikoloz Basilashvili	4–6, 4–6

=== Earnings ===
- **Bold** font denotes tournament win

Event	Prize money	Year-to-date
Auckland Open	$47,105	$47,105
Australian Open	A$142,500	$159,851
Delray Beach Open	$9,030	$168,881
**Mexican Open**	$354,130	$523,011
**Indian Wells Masters**	$1,340,860	$1,863,871
Miami Open	$327,965	$2,191,836
Madrid Open	€77,575	$2,296,214
Italian Open	€60,945	$2,357,370
French Open	€560,000	$3,009,770
Wimbledon	£281,000	$3,380,746
Los Cabos Open	$67,220	$3,447,966
Cincinnati Masters	$136,580	$3,619,601
US Open	$1,850,000	$5,469,601
China Open	$359,510	$5,829,111
Shanghai Open	$88,655	$5,917,766
		**$5,917,766**

Figures in United States dollars (USD) unless noted.

== See also ==
- 2018 ATP World Tour
- 2018 Roger Federer tennis season
- 2018 Rafael Nadal tennis season
- 2018 Novak Djokovic tennis season
