= 2018 Swiss Indoors – Doubles =

Doubles
- 2018 Swiss Indoors

Final
- Champions: (United Kingdom) Dominic Inglot (Croatia) Franko Škugor
- Runners-up: (Germany) Alexander Zverev (Germany) Mischa Zverev
- Score: 6–2, 7–5

Details
- Draw: 16
- Seeds: 4

Events
Singles	Doubles
← 2017 ·	Swiss Indoors	· 2019 →

Ivan Dodig and Marcel Granollers were the defending champions, but chose not to participate together. Dodig was scheduled to play alongside Ben McLachlan, but withdrew with a back injury. Granollers teamed up with Rohan Bopanna, but lost in the quarterfinals to Dominic Inglot and Franko Škugor.

Inglot and Škugor went on to win the title, defeating Alexander and Mischa Zverev in the final 6–2, 7–5.

== Seeds ==
1. (South Africa) Raven Klaasen / (New Zealand) Michael Venus (first round)
2. (Croatia) Ivan Dodig / (Japan) Ben McLachlan (withdrew)
3. (Netherlands) Jean-Julien Rojer / (Romania) Horia Tecău (quarterfinals)
4. (India) Rohan Bopanna / (Spain) Marcel Granollers (quarterfinals)

== Draw ==
=== Key ===
- Q = Qualifier
- WC = Wild card
- LL = Lucky loser
- Alt = Alternate
- SE = Special exempt
- PR = Protected ranking
- ITF = ITF entry
- JE = Junior exempt
- w/o = Walkover
- r = Retired
- d = Defaulted
- SR = Special ranking

=== Draw ===
First round
1	(South Africa) R Klaasen (New Zealand) M Venus	5	7	[5]
WC	(Switzerland) M-A Hüsler (Netherlands) S Verbeek	7	5	[10]
(India) D Sharan (New Zealand) A Sitak	6	6^{3}	[10]
(Australia) M Ebden (Russia) D Medvedev	4	7^{7}	[7]
3	(Netherlands) J-J Rojer (Romania) H Tecău	6	6
(Netherlands) R Haase (Netherlands) M Middelkoop	3	4
(Germany) A Zverev (Germany) M Zverev	4	7^{7}	[10]
(United States) N Monroe (United States) J Sock	6	6^{2}	[4]
(Italy) M Cecchinato (Italy) A Seppi	3	4
(United Kingdom) D Inglot (Croatia) F Škugor	6	6
Q	(Spain) G García López (Spain) D Marrero	1	4
4	(India) R Bopanna (Spain) M Granollers	6	6
WC	(Switzerland) H Laaksonen (Switzerland) L Margaroli	7^{7}	3	[5]
(Chile) J Peralta (Argentina) H Zeballos	6^{4}	6	[10]
(Pakistan) A-u-H Qureshi (Greece) S Tsitsipas	7^{7}	3	[10]
LL	(Sweden) R Lindstedt (France) F Martin	6^{4}	6	[6]

Quarterfinals
WC	(Switzerland) M-A Hüsler (Netherlands) S Verbeek	6	6^{8}	[5]
(India) D Sharan (New Zealand) A Sitak	1	7^{10}	[10]
3	(Netherlands) J-J Rojer (Romania) H Tecău	4	4
(Germany) A Zverev (Germany) M Zverev	6	6
(United Kingdom) D Inglot (Croatia) F Škugor	2	7^{8}	[10]
4	(India) R Bopanna (Spain) M Granollers	6	6^{6}	[3]
(Chile) J Peralta (Argentina) H Zeballos	7	6
(Pakistan) A-u-H Qureshi (Greece) S Tsitsipas	5	3

Semifinals
(India) D Sharan (New Zealand) A Sitak	1	3
(Germany) A Zverev (Germany) M Zverev	6	6
(United Kingdom) D Inglot (Croatia) F Škugor	5	6	[10]
(Chile) J Peralta (Argentina) H Zeballos	7	3	[6]

Final
(Germany) A Zverev (Germany) M Zverev	2	5
(United Kingdom) D Inglot (Croatia) F Škugor	6	7

== Qualifying ==
=== Seeds ===
1. (Sweden) Robert Lindstedt / (France) Fabrice Martin (qualifying competition, lucky losers)
2. (Chile) Nicolás Jarry / (Argentina) Leonardo Mayer (first round)

=== Qualifiers ===
1. (Spain) Guillermo García López / (Spain) David Marrero

=== Lucky losers ===
1. (Sweden) Robert Lindstedt / (France) Fabrice Martin

=== Qualifying draw ===
First round
1	(Sweden) Robert Lindstedt (France) Fabrice Martin	6	6
WC	(Switzerland) Sandro Ehrat (Switzerland) Jakub Paul	3	1
(Spain) Guillermo García López (Spain) David Marrero	6	6^{2}	[12]
2	(Chile) Nicolás Jarry (Argentina) Leonardo Mayer	4	7^{7}	[10]

Qualifying competition
1	(Sweden) Robert Lindstedt (France) Fabrice Martin	3	6	[7]
(Spain) Guillermo García López (Spain) David Marrero	6	4	[10]
