= 2016 Swiss Indoors =

- Date: 24–30 October
- Edition: 47th
- Category: ATP World Tour 500
- Draw: 32S / 16D
- Prize money: €1,701,320
- Surface: Hard
- Location: Basel, Switzerland
- Venue: St. Jakobshalle

Champions

Singles
- (Croatia) Marin Čilić

Doubles
- (Spain) Marcel Granollers / (United States) Jack Sock
← 2015 ·	Swiss Indoors	· 2017 →

The 2016 Swiss Indoors was a men's tennis tournament played on indoor hard courts. It was the 47th edition of the event, and part of the 500 series of the 2016 ATP World Tour. It was held at the St. Jakobshalle in Basel, Switzerland, from 24 October through 30 October 2016. Fourth-seeded Marin Čilić won the singles title.

== Points and prize money ==
=== Point distribution ===
Event	W	F	SF	QF	Round of 16	Round of 32	Q	Q2	Q1
Singles	500	300	180	90	45	0	20	10	0
Doubles	500	300	180	90	0	—	—	—	—

=== Prize money ===
Event	W	F	SF	QF	Round of 16	Round of 32	Q2	Q1
Singles	€387,100	€181,800	€90,270	€45,135	€22,870	€12,035	€2,005	€1,105
Doubles	€114,100	€53,900	€26,020	€13,530	€7,080	—	—	—

== Singles main-draw entrants ==
=== Seeds ===
Country	Player	Rank^{1}	Seed
SUI	Stan Wawrinka	3	1
CAN	Milos Raonic	4	2
JPN	Kei Nishikori	5	3
CRO	Marin Čilić	11	4
BEL	David Goffin	12	5
BUL	Grigor Dimitrov	18	6
FRA	Richard Gasquet	19	7
USA	Jack Sock	23	8

- Rankings are as of October 17, 2016

=== Other entrants ===
The following players received wildcards into the singles main draw:

- (Switzerland) Marco Chiudinelli
- (Argentina) Juan Martín del Potro
- (Switzerland) Henri Laaksonen

The following players received entry from the qualifying draw:

- (Lithuania) Ričardas Berankis
- (Netherlands) Robin Haase
- (United States) Donald Young
- (Germany) Mischa Zverev

=== Withdrawals ===
Before the tournament

- (Croatia) Borna Ćorić →replaced by (Russia) Mikhail Youzhny
- (Australia) Nick Kyrgios (suspension) →replaced by (United States) Taylor Fritz
- (Argentina) Juan Mónaco →replaced by (Germany) Florian Mayer
- (Spain) Rafael Nadal (wrist injury) →replaced by (Serbia) Dušan Lajović

=== Retirements ===
- (France) Richard Gasquet

== Doubles main-draw entrants ==
=== Seeds ===
Country	Player	Country	Player	Rank^{1}	Seed
NED	Jean-Julien Rojer	ROU	Horia Tecău	19	1
FRA	Nicolas Mahut	FRA	Édouard Roger-Vasselin	23	2
RSA	Raven Klaasen	USA	Rajeev Ram	32	3
ESP	Marcel Granollers	USA	Jack Sock	39	4

- Rankings are as of October 17, 2016

=== Other entrants ===
The following pairs received wildcards into the doubles main draw:

- (Switzerland) Antoine Bellier / (Switzerland) Marco Chiudinelli
- (Switzerland) Adrien Bossel / (Switzerland) Henri Laaksonen

The following pair received entry from the qualifying draw:

- (Argentina) Federico Delbonis / (Argentina) Guido Pella

== Finals ==
=== Singles ===
- (Croatia) Marin Čilić defeated (Japan) Kei Nishikori, 6–1, 7–6^{(7–5)}

=== Doubles ===
- (Spain) Marcel Granollers / (United States) Jack Sock defeated (Sweden) Robert Lindstedt / (New Zealand) Michael Venus, 6–3, 6–4
