= 2016 Swiss Indoors – Doubles =

Doubles
- 2016 Swiss Indoors

Final
- Champions: (Spain) Marcel Granollers (United States) Jack Sock
- Runners-up: (Sweden) Robert Lindstedt (New Zealand) Michael Venus
- Score: 6−3, 6−4

Details
- Draw: 16
- Seeds: 4

Events
Singles	Doubles
← 2015 ·	Swiss Indoors	· 2017 →

Alexander Peya and Bruno Soares were the defending champions, but they chose to compete (with different partners) in Vienna instead.

Marcel Granollers and Jack Sock won the title, defeating Robert Lindstedt and Michael Venus in the final, 6–3, 6–4.

== Seeds ==
1. (Netherlands) Jean-Julien Rojer / (Romania) Horia Tecău (semifinals)
2. (France) Nicolas Mahut / (France) Édouard Roger-Vasselin (semifinals)
3. (South Africa) Raven Klaasen / (United States) Rajeev Ram (quarterfinals)
4. (Spain) Marcel Granollers / (United States) Jack Sock (champions)

== Draw ==
Key

- Q = Qualifier
- WC = Wild card
- LL = Lucky loser
- Alt = Alternate
- ITF = ITF entry
- PR = Protected ranking
- SR = Special ranking
- SE = Special exempt
- JE = Junior exempt
- JR = Junior Accelerator Programme entrant
- CO = College Accelerator Programme entrant
- NG = Next Gen Accelerator Program entrant
- w/o = Walkover
- r = Retired
- d = Defaulted

=== Draw ===
First round
1	(Netherlands) J-J Rojer (Romania) H Tecău	6	3	[10]
Q	(Argentina) F Delbonis (Argentina) G Pella	3	6	[3]
(Philippines) T Huey (Belarus) M Mirnyi	7	6
WC	(Switzerland) A Bellier (Switzerland) M Chiudinelli	5	4
3	(South Africa) R Klaasen (United States) R Ram	6	6
(Spain) P Carreño Busta (Italy) P Lorenzi	2	4
(Sweden) R Lindstedt (New Zealand) M Venus	7^{7}	6
(Croatia) I Dodig (Serbia) N Zimonjić	6^{3}	3
WC	(Switzerland) A Bossel (Switzerland) H Laaksonen	6^{3}	3
(United Kingdom) D Inglot (Romania) F Mergea	7^{7}	6
(Colombia) JS Cabal (Colombia) R Farah	3	7	[5]
4	(Spain) M Granollers (United States) J Sock	6	5	[10]
(Cyprus) M Baghdatis (Luxembourg) G Müller	5	7^{8}	[1]
(Spain) D Marrero (Poland) M Matkowski	7	6^{6}	[10]
(Finland) H Kontinen (Australia) J Peers	4	6^{5}
2	(France) N Mahut (France) É Roger-Vasselin	6	7^{7}

Quarterfinals
1	(Netherlands) J-J Rojer (Romania) H Tecău	6^{9}	6	[10]
(Philippines) T Huey (Belarus) M Mirnyi	7^{11}	4	[4]
3	(South Africa) R Klaasen (United States) R Ram	4	5
(Sweden) R Lindstedt (New Zealand) M Venus	6	7
(United Kingdom) D Inglot (Romania) F Mergea	5	2^{r}
4	(Spain) M Granollers (United States) J Sock	7	2
(Spain) D Marrero (Poland) M Matkowski	1	4
2	(France) N Mahut (France) É Roger-Vasselin	6	6

Semifinals
1	(Netherlands) J-J Rojer (Romania) H Tecău	6	3	[8]
(Sweden) R Lindstedt (New Zealand) M Venus	1	6	[10]
4	(Spain) M Granollers (United States) J Sock	6	6
2	(France) N Mahut (France) É Roger-Vasselin	3	4

Final
(Sweden) R Lindstedt (New Zealand) M Venus	3	4
4	(Spain) M Granollers (United States) J Sock	6	6

== Qualifying ==
=== Seeds ===
1. (United States) Taylor Fritz / (France) Adrian Mannarino (qualifying competition)
2. (Argentina) Federico Delbonis / (Argentina) Guido Pella (qualified)

=== Qualifiers ===
1. (Argentina) Federico Delbonis / (Argentina) Guido Pella

=== Qualifying draw ===
First round
1	(United States) Taylor Fritz (France) Adrian Mannarino	6	6
(Netherlands) Robin Haase (Russia) Mikhail Youzhny	2	4
WC	(Switzerland) Johan Nikles (Greece) Stefanos Tsitsipas	4	4
2	(Argentina) Federico Delbonis (Argentina) Guido Pella	6	6

Qualifying competition
1	(United States) Taylor Fritz (France) Adrian Mannarino	6	6^{7}	[1]
2	(Argentina) Federico Delbonis (Argentina) Guido Pella	2	7^{9}	[10]
