= 2017 Swiss Indoors – Doubles =

Doubles
- 2017 Swiss Indoors

Final
- Champions: (Croatia) Ivan Dodig (Spain) Marcel Granollers
- Runners-up: (France) Fabrice Martin (France) Édouard Roger-Vasselin
- Score: 7–5, 7–6^{(8–6)}

Details
- Draw: 16
- Seeds: 4

Events
| Singles | Doubles |
| ← 2016 · | Swiss Indoors | · 2018 → |

Marcel Granollers and Jack Sock were the defending champions, but chose not to participate together this year. Granollers played alongside Ivan Dodig and successfully defended the title, defeating Fabrice Martin and Édouard Roger-Vasselin in the final, 7–5, 7–6^{(8–6)}. Sock teamed up with Nicholas Monroe, but lost to Dodig and Granollers in the semifinals.

== Seeds ==
1. (Finland) Henri Kontinen / (Australia) John Peers (first round)
2. (Croatia) Ivan Dodig / (Spain) Marcel Granollers (champions)
3. (South Africa) Raven Klaasen / (United States) Rajeev Ram (first round)
4. (Colombia) Juan Sebastián Cabal / (Colombia) Robert Farah (quarterfinals)

== Draw ==
=== Key ===
- Q = Qualifier
- WC = Wild card
- LL = Lucky loser
- Alt = Alternate
- SE = Special exempt
- PR = Protected ranking
- ITF = ITF entry
- JE = Junior exempt
- w/o = Walkover
- r = Retired
- d = Defaulted
- SR = Special ranking

=== Draw ===
First round
1 | (Finland) H Kontinen (Australia) J Peers | 6^{5} | 3
Q | (New Zealand) M Daniell (United Kingdom) D Inglot | 7^{7} | 6
WC | (Switzerland) M-A Hüsler (Serbia) N Zimonjić | 6 | 4 | [10]
(France) A Mannarino (France) B Paire | 4 | 6 | [6]
4 | (Colombia) JS Cabal (Colombia) R Farah | 6 | 6
(Spain) R Bautista Agut (Italy) P Lorenzi | 2 | 2
(France) F Martin (France) É Roger-Vasselin | 6 | 7^{7}
WC | (Switzerland) M Chiudinelli (Switzerland) L Margaroli | 3 | 6^{3}
(Croatia) N Mektić (Croatia) F Škugor | 6 | 6
(Pakistan) A-u-H Qureshi (Germany) M Zverev | 4 | 4
(United States) N Monroe (United States) J Sock | 3 | 6 | [10]
3 | (South Africa) R Klaasen (United States) R Ram | 6 | 3 | [7]
(Netherlands) R Haase (New Zealand) M Venus | 2 | 3
(France) J Benneteau (France) N Mahut | 6 | 6
(United States) R Harrison (United States) S Johnson | 6^{5} | 2
2 | (Croatia) I Dodig (Spain) M Granollers | 7^{7} | 6

Quarterfinals
Q | (New Zealand) M Daniell (United Kingdom) D Inglot | 6 | 3 | [10]
WC | (Switzerland) M-A Hüsler (Serbia) N Zimonjić | 3 | 6 | [6]
4 | (Colombia) JS Cabal (Colombia) R Farah | 5 | 5
(France) F Martin (France) É Roger-Vasselin | 7 | 7
(Croatia) N Mektić (Croatia) F Škugor | 7 | 6^{7} | [4]
(United States) N Monroe (United States) J Sock | 5 | 7^{9} | [10]
(France) J Benneteau (France) N Mahut | 4 | 4
2 | (Croatia) I Dodig (Spain) M Granollers | 6 | 6

Semifinals
Q | (New Zealand) M Daniell (United Kingdom) D Inglot | 6 | 3 | [11]
(France) F Martin (France) É Roger-Vasselin | 3 | 6 | [13]
(United States) N Monroe (United States) J Sock | 5 | 3
2 | (Croatia) I Dodig (Spain) M Granollers | 7 | 6

Final
(France) F Martin (France) É Roger-Vasselin | 5 | 6^{6}
2 | (Croatia) I Dodig (Spain) M Granollers | 7 | 7^{8}

== Qualifying ==
=== Seeds ===
1. (New Zealand) Marcus Daniell / (United Kingdom) Dominic Inglot (qualified)
2. (Chile) Hans Podlipnik-Castillo / (Belarus) Andrei Vasilevski (qualifying competition)

=== Qualifiers ===
1. (New Zealand) Marcus Daniell / (United Kingdom) Dominic Inglot

=== Qualifying draw ===
First round
1 | (New Zealand) Marcus Daniell (United Kingdom) Dominic Inglot | 6 | 6
(Uzbekistan) Denis Istomin (Argentina) Leonardo Mayer | 4 | 3
WC | (Switzerland) Adrian Bodmer (Switzerland) Adrien Bossel | 3 | 6^{5}
2 | (Chile) Hans Podlipnik-Castillo (Belarus) Andrei Vasilevski | 6 | 7^{7}

Qualifying competition
1 | (New Zealand) Marcus Daniell (United Kingdom) Dominic Inglot | 2 | 7^{9} | [10]
2 | (Chile) Hans Podlipnik-Castillo (Belarus) Andrei Vasilevski | 6 | 6^{7} | [6]
