= 2018 ABN AMRO World Tennis Tournament – Doubles =

Sports Tennis

Doubles
- 2018 ABN AMRO World Tennis Tournament

Final
- Champions: (France) Pierre-Hugues Herbert; (France) Nicolas Mahut
- Runners-up: (Austria) Oliver Marach; (Croatia) Mate Pavić
- Score: 2–6, 6–2, [10–7]

Events
Singles	Doubles
- ABN AMRO World Tennis Tournament

Ivan Dodig and Marcel Granollers were the defending champions, but Granollers chose not to participate this year. Dodig played alongside Rajeev Ram, but lost in the semifinals to Pierre-Hugues Herbert and Nicolas Mahut.

Herbert and Mahut went on to win the title, defeating Oliver Marach and Mate Pavić in the final, 2–6, 6–2, [10–7].

== Seeds ==
1. (Poland) Łukasz Kubot / (Brazil) Marcelo Melo (quarterfinals)
2. (Austria) Oliver Marach / (Croatia) Mate Pavić (final)
3. (France) Pierre-Hugues Herbert / (France) Nicolas Mahut (champions)
4. (Netherlands) Jean-Julien Rojer / (Romania) Horia Tecău (semifinals)

== Draw ==
Key

- Q = Qualifier
- WC = Wild card
- LL = Lucky loser
- Alt = Alternate
- ITF = ITF entry
- PR = Protected ranking
- SR = Special ranking
- SE = Special exempt
- JE = Junior exempt
- JR = Junior Accelerator Programme entrant
- CO = College Accelerator Programme entrant
- NG = Next Gen Accelerator Program entrant
- w/o = Walkover
- r = Retired
- d = Defaulted

=== Draw ===
First round

Quarterfinals

Semifinals

Final

1
(Poland) Ł Kubot
(Brazil) M Melo
7^{7}
7

- (South Africa) R Klaasen
- (New Zealand) M Venus
6^{2}
5

1
- (Poland) Ł Kubot
- (Brazil) M Melo
5
6^{5}

(Croatia) I Dodig
(United States) R Ram
6
6

(Croatia) I Dodig
(United States) R Ram
7
7^{7}

- (Germany) A Zverev
- (Germany) M Zverev
3
2

- (Croatia) I Dodig
- (United States) R Ram
6^{5}
6
[6]

3
(France) P-H Herbert
(France) N Mahut
6
6

3
(France) P-H Herbert
(France) N Mahut
7^{7}
4
[10]

- (Poland) M Matkowski
- (Pakistan) A-u-H Qureshi
4
4

3
(France) P-H Herbert
(France) N Mahut
6
6

(Russia) K Khachanov
(France) L Pouille
6
6^{5}
[10]

- (Russia) K Khachanov
- (France) L Pouille
3
2

- (India) R Bopanna
- (France) É Roger-Vasselin
4
7^{7}
[5]

3
(France) P-H Herbert
(France) N Mahut
2
6
[10]

WC
(Netherlands) R Haase
(Netherlands) M Middelkoop
6
6

2
- (Austria) O Marach
- (Croatia) M Pavić
6
2
[7]

WC
- (Netherlands) J Smit
- (Netherlands) J Timmermans
2
4

WC
- (Netherlands) R Haase
- (Netherlands) M Middelkoop
1
2

- (Spain) F López
- (Spain) M López
4
4

4
(Netherlands) J-J Rojer
(Romania) H Tecău
6
6

4
(Netherlands) J-J Rojer
(Romania) H Tecău
6
6

4
- (Netherlands) J-J Rojer
- (Romania) H Tecău
1
3

(Bosnia and Herzegovina) D Džumhur
(Serbia) F Krajinović
6
6

2
(Austria) O Marach
(Croatia) M Pavić
6
6

- (Russia) A Rublev
- (Serbia) N Zimonjić
3
3

- (Bosnia and Herzegovina) D Džumhur
- (Serbia) F Krajinović
1
1

Q
- (Netherlands) S Arends
- (Netherlands) T de Bakker
4
6
[9]

2
(Austria) O Marach
(Croatia) M Pavić
6
6

2
(Austria) O Marach
(Croatia) M Pavić
6
1
[11]

== Qualifying ==
=== Seeds ===
1. (United States) James Cerretani / (Canada) Adil Shamasdin (first round)
2. (Germany) Philipp Petzschner / (Germany) Jan-Lennard Struff (first round)

=== Qualifiers ===
1. (Netherlands) Sander Arends / (Netherlands) Thiemo de Bakker

=== Qualifying draw ===
First round

Qualifying competition

1
- (United States) James Cerretani
- (Canada) Adil Shamasdin
6^{10}
7
[5]

(Israel) Jonathan Erlich
(Greece) Stefanos Tsitsipas
7^{12}
5
[10]

- (Israel) Jonathan Erlich
- (Greece) Stefanos Tsitsipas
6^{3}
6
[6]

WC
(Netherlands) Sander Arends
(Netherlands) Thiemo de Bakker
7^{7}
4
[10]

WC
(Netherlands) Sander Arends
(Netherlands) Thiemo de Bakker
5
7
[10]

2
- (Germany) Philipp Petzschner
- (Germany) Jan-Lennard Struff
7
5
[8]
