= 2017 Swiss Indoors =

- Date: 23–29 October
- Edition: 48th
- Category: ATP World Tour 500
- Draw: 32S / 16D
- Prize money: €1,837,425
- Surface: Hard
- Location: Basel, Switzerland
- Venue: St. Jakobshalle

Champions

Singles
- (Switzerland) Roger Federer

Doubles
- (Croatia) Ivan Dodig / (Spain) Marcel Granollers
← 2016 ·	Swiss Indoors	· 2018 →

The 2017 Swiss Indoors was a men's tennis tournament played on indoor hard courts. It was the 48th edition of the tournament, and part of the 500 series of the 2017 ATP World Tour. It was held at the St. Jakobshalle in Basel, Switzerland, from 23 October through 29 October 2017. The event was the final professional tennis tournament for Swiss player Marco Chiudinelli, who received wildcards into both the singles and the doubles draws. First-seeded Roger Federer won his eighth singles title at the event.

== Finals ==
=== Singles ===
- (Switzerland) Roger Federer defeated (Argentina) Juan Martín del Potro, 6–7^{(5–7)}, 6–4, 6–3

=== Doubles ===
- (Croatia) Ivan Dodig / (Spain) Marcel Granollers defeated (France) Fabrice Martin / (France) Édouard Roger-Vasselin, 7–5, 7–6^{(8–6)}

== Points and prize money ==
=== Point distribution ===
Event	W	F	SF	QF	Round of 16	Round of 32	Q	Q2	Q1
Singles	500	300	180	90	45	0	20	10	0
Doubles	500	300	180	90	0	—	—	—	—

=== Prize money ===
Event	W	F	SF	QF	Round of 16	Round of 32	Q2	Q1
Singles	€395,850	€194,070	€97,650	€49,665	€25,790	€13,600	€3,010	€1,535
Doubles	€119,190	€58,350	€29,270	€15,020	€7,770	—	—	—

== Singles main-draw entrants ==
=== Seeds ===
Country	Player	Rank^{1}	Seed
SUI	Roger Federer	2	1
CRO	Marin Čilić	4	2
BEL	David Goffin	10	3
ARG	Juan Martín del Potro	19	4
USA	Jack Sock	21	5
ESP	Roberto Bautista Agut	22	6
FRA	Adrian Mannarino	29	7
GER	Mischa Zverev	30	8

- Rankings are as of October 16, 2017

=== Other entrants ===
The following players received wildcards into the singles main draw:

- (Switzerland) Marco Chiudinelli
- (Switzerland) Henri Laaksonen
- (United States) Frances Tiafoe

The following player received entry as a special exempt:

- (Belgium) Ruben Bemelmans

The following players received entry from the qualifying draw:

- (France) Julien Benneteau
- (Hungary) Márton Fucsovics
- (Germany) Peter Gojowczyk
- (Kazakhstan) Mikhail Kukushkin

The following players received entry as lucky losers:

- (Germany) Florian Mayer
- (Canada) Vasek Pospisil

=== Withdrawals ===
Before the tournament

- (United Kingdom) Aljaž Bedene →replaced by (Canada) Vasek Pospisil
- (Australia) Nick Kyrgios →replaced by (Croatia) Borna Ćorić
- (Luxembourg) Gilles Müller →replaced by (Portugal) João Sousa
- (Spain) Rafael Nadal →replaced by (United States) Donald Young
- (Spain) Fernando Verdasco →replaced by (Germany) Florian Mayer

=== Retirements ===
- (Germany) Florian Mayer
- (Argentina) Leonardo Mayer

== Doubles main-draw entrants ==
=== Seeds ===
Country	Player	Country	Player	Rank^{1}	Seed
FIN	Henri Kontinen	AUS	John Peers	3	1
CRO	Ivan Dodig	ESP	Marcel Granollers	30	2
RSA	Raven Klaasen	USA	Rajeev Ram	33	3
COL	Juan Sebastián Cabal	COL	Robert Farah	50	4

- Rankings are as of October 16, 2017

=== Other entrants ===
The following pairs received wildcards into the doubles main draw:

- (Switzerland) Marco Chiudinelli / (Switzerland) Luca Margaroli
- (Switzerland) Marc-Andrea Hüsler / (Serbia) Nenad Zimonjić

The following pair received entry from the qualifying draw:

- (New Zealand) Marcus Daniell / (United Kingdom) Dominic Inglot
