= 2016 Swiss Indoors – Singles =

Singles
- 2016 Swiss Indoors

Final
- Champion: (Croatia) Marin Čilić
- Runner-up: (Japan) Kei Nishikori
- Score: 6–1, 7–6^{(7–5)}

Details
- Draw: 32 (4 Q / 3 WC )
- Seeds: 8

Events
Singles	Doubles
- Swiss Indoors

Roger Federer, the seven-time winner and defending champion, did not participate in this tennis competition due to injury. It would be the first time since 2005 that he would not play in the final in his hometown of Basel. Federer had played in ten consecutive finals from 2006 to 2015. This would be the only year between 2006 and 2019 that Federer wasn’t in the final.

Marin Čilić won the title, defeating Kei Nishikori in the final, 6–1, 7–6^{(7–5)}.

In the 2010s, this was the only year that the title wasn’t won by Federer or Juan Martin del Potro.

== Seeds ==
1. (Switzerland) Stan Wawrinka (quarterfinals)
2. (Canada) Milos Raonic (first round)
3. (Japan) Kei Nishikori (final)
4. (Croatia) Marin Čilić (champion)
5. (Belgium) David Goffin (second round)
6. (Bulgaria) Grigor Dimitrov (first round)
7. (France) Richard Gasquet (first round, retired)
8. (United States) Jack Sock (second round)

== Draw ==
Key

- Q = Qualifier
- WC = Wild card
- LL = Lucky loser
- Alt = Alternate
- ITF = ITF entry
- PR = Protected ranking
- SR = Special ranking
- SE = Special exempt
- JE = Junior exempt
- JR = Junior Accelerator Programme entrant
- CO = College Accelerator Programme entrant
- NG = Next Gen Accelerator Program entrant
- w/o = Walkover
- r = Retired
- d = Defaulted

=== Finals ===
Semifinals
Q	(Germany) Mischa Zverev	6	5	3
4	(Croatia) Marin Čilić	4	7	6
3	(Japan) Kei Nishikori	4	7^{7}	6
(Luxembourg) Gilles Müller	6	6^{3}	3

Final
4	(Croatia) Marin Čilić	6	7^{7}
3	(Japan) Kei Nishikori	1	6^{5}

=== Top half ===
First round
1	(Switzerland) S Wawrinka	6^{1}	6	6
WC	(Switzerland) M Chiudinelli	7^{7}	1	4
(Ukraine) I Marchenko	4	2
Q	(United States) D Young	6	6
Q	(Germany) M Zverev	7^{7}	6
(United States) T Fritz	6^{4}	0
(Argentina) G Pella	6	2
7	(France) R Gasquet	2	1^{r}
4	(Croatia) M Čilić	6	6
(Russia) M Youzhny	4	2
(Spain) F Verdasco	5	3
(Spain) P Carreño Busta	7	6
(Spain) M Granollers	6	3	6
WC	(Switzerland) H Laaksonen	3	6	2
(France) A Mannarino	3	3
8	(United States) J Sock	6	6

Second round
1	(Switzerland) S Wawrinka	7^{7}	6^{3}	6
Q	(United States) D Young	6^{4}	7^{7}	4
Q	(Germany) M Zverev	6	6
(Argentina) G Pella	4	2
4	(Croatia) M Čilić	6	7^{7}
(Spain) P Carreño Busta	0	6^{4}
(Spain) M Granollers	6	6
8	(United States) J Sock	3	1

Quarterfinals
1	(Switzerland) S Wawrinka	2	7	1
Q	(Germany) M Zverev	6	5	6
4	(Croatia) M Čilić	6	6
(Spain) M Granollers	3	3

Semifinals
Q	(Germany) M Zverev	6	5	3
4	(Croatia) M Čilić	4	7	6

=== Bottom half ===
First round
5	(Belgium) D Goffin	6	7^{7}
(Cyprus) M Baghdatis	4	6^{4}
WC	(Argentina) JM del Potro	6	6
Q	(Netherlands) R Haase	3	4
(France) N Mahut	4	6^{4}
(Italy) P Lorenzi	6	7^{7}
(Serbia) D Lajović	5	1
3	(Japan) K Nishikori	7	6
6	(Bulgaria) G Dimitrov	7^{11}	4	4
(Luxembourg) G Müller	6^{9}	6	6
(France) B Paire	1	7^{7}	4
(Germany) F Mayer	6	6^{2}	6
(Russia) A Kuznetsov	4	4
(Argentina) F Delbonis	6	6
Q	(Lithuania) R Berankis	3	6	6
2	(Canada) M Raonic	6	3	3

Second round
5	(Belgium) D Goffin	5	3
WC	(Argentina) JM del Potro	7	6
(Italy) P Lorenzi	6^{3}	2
3	(Japan) K Nishikori	7^{7}	6
(Luxembourg) G Müller	6	6
(Germany) F Mayer	3	2
(Argentina) F Delbonis	6^{4}	7^{7}	6
Q	(Lithuania) R Berankis	7^{7}	6^{3}	3

Quarterfinals
WC	(Argentina) JM del Potro	5	4
3	(Japan) K Nishikori	7	6
(Luxembourg) G Müller	6^{4}	6	7^{7}
(Argentina) F Delbonis	7^{7}	4	6^{3}

Semifinals
3	(Japan) K Nishikori	4	7^{7}	6
(Luxembourg) G Müller	6	6^{3}	3

== Qualifying ==
=== Seeds ===
1. (Netherlands) Robin Haase (qualified)
2. (France) Paul-Henri Mathieu (first round)
3. (Germany) Mischa Zverev (qualified)
4. (United States) Donald Young (qualified)
5. (Lithuania) Ričardas Berankis (qualified)
6. (Croatia) Ivan Dodig (first round)
7. (United States) Ryan Harrison (qualifying competition)
8. (United States) Rajeev Ram (first round)

=== Qualifiers ===
1. (Netherlands) Robin Haase
2. (Lithuania) Ričardas Berankis
3. (Germany) Mischa Zverev
4. (United States) Donald Young

=== Qualifying draw ===
==== First qualifier ====
First round
1	(Netherlands) Robin Haase	6	6
PR	(Spain) Pablo Andújar	3	1
WC	(Greece) Stefanos Tsitsipas	4	7^{7}	6
8	(United States) Rajeev Ram	6	6^{3}	2

Qualifying competition
1	(Netherlands) Robin Haase	7^{7}	6
WC	(Greece) Stefanos Tsitsipas	6^{2}	4

==== Second qualifier ====
First round
2	(France) Paul-Henri Mathieu	6	3	6^{4}
WC	(Switzerland) Adrien Bossel	3	6	7^{7}
(Slovakia) Jozef Kovalík	3	1
5	(Lithuania) Ričardas Berankis	6	6

Qualifying competition
WC	(Switzerland) Adrien Bossel	2	2
5	(Lithuania) Ričardas Berankis	6	6

==== Third qualifier ====
First round
3	(Germany) Mischa Zverev	6	7^{7}
(Canada) Vasek Pospisil	4	6^{5}
Alt	(Switzerland) Johan Nikles	1	2
7	(United States) Ryan Harrison	6	6

Qualifying competition
3	(Germany) Mischa Zverev	7^{7}	6
7	(United States) Ryan Harrison	6^{4}	3

==== Fourth qualifier ====
First round
4	(United States) Donald Young	6	6
WC	(Switzerland) Antoine Bellier	2	1
(Bosnia and Herzegovina) Aldin Šetkić	6	6
6	(Croatia) Ivan Dodig	4	4

Qualifying competition
4	(United States) Donald Young	7^{7}	6
(Bosnia and Herzegovina) Aldin Šetkić	6^{5}	0
