= 2018 ABN AMRO World Tennis Tournament – Singles =

Singles
- 2018 ABN AMRO World Tennis Tournament

Final
- Champion: (Switzerland) Roger Federer
- Runner-up: (Bulgaria) Grigor Dimitrov
- Score: 6–2, 6–2

Details
- Draw: 32 (4 Q / 4 WC )
- Seeds: 8

Events
Singles	Doubles
← 2017 ·	ABN AMRO World Tennis Tournament	· 2019 →

Jo-Wilfried Tsonga was the defending champion, but withdrew before the tournament began with a left hamstring injury.

Roger Federer regained the ATP No. 1 singles ranking by reaching the semifinals and went on to win his third title in Rotterdam, defeating Grigor Dimitrov in the final, 6–2, 6–2.

== Seeds ==
1. (Switzerland) Roger Federer (champion)
2. (Bulgaria) Grigor Dimitrov (final)
3. (Germany) Alexander Zverev (second round)
4. (Belgium) David Goffin (semifinals, retired due to eye injury)
5. (Switzerland) Stan Wawrinka (first round)
6. (Czech Republic) Tomáš Berdych (quarterfinals, withdrew due to illness)
7. (France) Lucas Pouille (first round)
8. (France) Jo-Wilfried Tsonga (withdrew)
9. (Luxembourg) Gilles Müller (first round)

== Draw ==
=== Key ===
- Q = Qualifier
- WC = Wild card
- LL = Lucky loser
- Alt = Alternate
- SE = Special exempt
- PR = Protected ranking
- ITF = ITF entry
- JE = Junior exempt
- w/o = Walkover
- r = Retired
- d = Defaulted
- SR = Special ranking

=== Finals ===
Semifinals
1/WC	(Switzerland) Roger Federer	6	7^{7}
LL	(Italy) Andreas Seppi	3	6^{3}
4	(Belgium) David Goffin	3	1^{r}
2	(Bulgaria) Grigor Dimitrov	6	0

Final
1/WC	(Switzerland) Roger Federer	6	6
2	(Bulgaria) Grigor Dimitrov	2	2

=== Top half ===
First round
1/WC	(Switzerland) R Federer	6	6
Q	(Belgium) R Bemelmans	1	2
(Germany) P Kohlschreiber	3	7^{7}	7^{7}
(Russia) K Khachanov	6	6^{1}	6^{5}
(Netherlands) R Haase	6	6
WC	(Netherlands) T de Bakker	2	2
WC	(Netherlands) T Griekspoor	4	6	6
5	(Switzerland) S Wawrinka	6	3	2
3	(Germany) A Zverev	6	6
(Spain) D Ferrer	4	3
(Portugal) J Sousa	4	6	2
LL	(Italy) A Seppi	6	1	6
(France) R Gasquet	1^{r}
Q	(France) P-H Herbert	3
Q	(Russia) D Medvedev	6	7^{11}
9	(Luxembourg) G Müller	4	6^{9}

Second round
1/WC	(Switzerland) R Federer	7^{10}	7
(Germany) P Kohlschreiber	6^{8}	5
(Netherlands) R Haase	6	6
WC	(Netherlands) T Griekspoor	4	0
3	(Germany) A Zverev	4	3
LL	(Italy) A Seppi	6	6
Q	(France) P-H Herbert	6	6^{2}	4
Q	(Russia) D Medvedev	3	7^{7}	6

Quarterfinals
1/WC	(Switzerland) R Federer	4	6	6
(Netherlands) R Haase	6	1	1
LL	(Italy) A Seppi	7^{7}	4	6
Q	(Russia) D Medvedev	6^{4}	6	3

Semifinals
1/WC	(Switzerland) R Federer	6	7^{7}
LL	(Italy) A Seppi	3	6^{3}

=== Bottom half ===
First round
6	(Czech Republic) T Berdych	7	6
(Germany) M Zverev	5	3
(Germany) J-L Struff	6	6^{5}	2
(Serbia) V Troicki	1	7^{7}	6
Q	(Slovakia) M Kližan	3	6^{4}
(Spain) F López	6	7^{7}
LL	(France) N Mahut	1	3
4	(Belgium) D Goffin	6	6
7	(France) L Pouille	5	4
(Russia) A Rublev	7	6
(Bosnia and Herzegovina) D Džumhur	6	6
SE	(Romania) M Copil	4	4
WC	(Canada) F Auger-Aliassime	2	6	5
(Serbia) F Krajinović	6	3	7
(Japan) Y Sugita	4	6^{5}
2	(Bulgaria) G Dimitrov	6	7^{7}

Second round
6	(Czech Republic) T Berdych	6	6
(Serbia) V Troicki	1	2
(Spain) F López	1	3
4	(Belgium) D Goffin	6	6
(Russia) A Rublev	6	7^{7}
(Bosnia and Herzegovina) D Džumhur	4	6^{4}
(Serbia) F Krajinović	6^{4}	5
2	(Bulgaria) G Dimitrov	7^{7}	7

Quarterfinals
6	(Czech Republic) T Berdych
4	(Belgium) D Goffin	w/o
(Russia) A Rublev	3	4
2	(Bulgaria) G Dimitrov	6	6

Semifinals
4	(Belgium) D Goffin	3	1^{r}
2	(Bulgaria) G Dimitrov	6	0

== Qualifying ==
=== Seeds ===
1. (Russia) Daniil Medvedev (qualified)
2. (Uzbekistan) Denis Istomin (first round)
3. (France) Pierre-Hugues Herbert (qualified)
4. (Italy) Andreas Seppi (qualifying competition, lucky loser)
5. (Greece) Stefanos Tsitsipas (first round)
6. (Italy) Thomas Fabbiano (first round)
7. (France) Nicolas Mahut (qualifying competition, lucky loser)
8. (Lithuania) Ričardas Berankis (qualifying competition)

=== Qualifiers ===
1. (Russia) Daniil Medvedev
2. (Belgium) Ruben Bemelmans
3. (France) Pierre-Hugues Herbert
4. (Slovakia) Martin Kližan

=== Lucky losers ===
1. (Italy) Andreas Seppi
2. (France) Nicolas Mahut

=== Qualifying draw ===
==== First qualifier ====
First round
1	(Russia) Daniil Medvedev	6	6
Alt	(France) Jonathan Eysseric	1	1
WC	(Netherlands) Botic van de Zandschulp	6	1	4
7	(France) Nicolas Mahut	4	6	6

Qualifying competition
1	(Russia) Daniil Medvedev	6	6
7	(France) Nicolas Mahut	4	4

==== Second qualifier ====
First round
2	(Uzbekistan) Denis Istomin	4	4
(Belgium) Ruben Bemelmans	6	6
WC	(Netherlands) Tim van Rijthoven	6	7^{7}
6	(Italy) Thomas Fabbiano	4	6^{3}

Qualifying competition
(Belgium) Ruben Bemelmans	6	6
WC	(Netherlands) Tim van Rijthoven	4	3

==== Third qualifier ====
First round
3	(France) Pierre-Hugues Herbert	4	6	6
(Belarus) Uladzimir Ignatik	6	3	4
(Germany) Matthias Bachinger	5	2
8	(Lithuania) Ričardas Berankis	7	6

Qualifying competition
3	(France) Pierre-Hugues Herbert	4	6	7^{8}
8	(Lithuania) Ričardas Berankis	6	3	6^{6}

==== Fourth qualifier ====
First round
4	(Italy) Andreas Seppi	7^{7}	6
WC	(Netherlands) Scott Griekspoor	6^{5}	4
(Slovakia) Martin Kližan	2	7^{7}	7^{7}
5	(Greece) Stefanos Tsitsipas	6	6^{4}	6^{5}

Qualifying competition
4	(Italy) Andreas Seppi	3	6^{2}
(Slovakia) Martin Kližan	6	7^{7}
