= 2018 Swiss Indoors – Singles =

Singles
- 2018 Swiss Indoors

Final
- Champion: (Switzerland) Roger Federer
- Runner-up: (Romania) Marius Copil
- Score: 7–6^{(7–5)}, 6–4

Details
- Draw: 32 (4 Q / 3 WC )
- Seeds: 8

Events
| Singles | Doubles |
| ← 2017 · | Swiss Indoors | · 2019 → |

Roger Federer was the defending champion and successfully defended his title, defeating Marius Copil in the final, 7–6^{(7–5)}, 6–4.

Roger Federer won his ninth Swiss Indoors, 99th singles title and also reached the final the past 12 times he has played this event. By winning the title, his consecutive winning streak in his hometown tournament was extended to 20 matches.

== Seeds ==
1. (Switzerland) Roger Federer (champion)
2. (Germany) Alexander Zverev (semifinals)
3. (Croatia) Marin Čilić (second round)
4. (Greece) Stefanos Tsitsipas (quarterfinals)
5. (United States) Jack Sock (first round)
6. (Italy) Marco Cecchinato (first round)
7. (Russia) Daniil Medvedev (semifinals)
8. (Spain) Roberto Bautista Agut (quarterfinals)

== Draw ==
=== Key ===
- Q = Qualifier
- WC = Wild card
- LL = Lucky loser
- Alt = Alternate
- SE = Special exempt
- PR = Protected ranking
- ITF = ITF entry
- JE = Junior exempt
- w/o = Walkover
- r = Retired
- d = Defaulted
- SR = Special ranking

=== Finals ===
Semifinals
1 | (Switzerland) Roger Federer | 6 | 6
7 | (Russia) Daniil Medvedev | 1 | 4
Q | (Romania) Marius Copil | 6 | 6^{6} | 6
2 | (Germany) Alexander Zverev | 3 | 7^{8} | 4

Final
1 | (Switzerland) Roger Federer | 7^{7} | 6
Q | (Romania) Marius Copil | 6^{5} | 4

=== Top half ===
First round
1 | (Switzerland) R Federer | 6 | 4 | 6
(Serbia) F Krajinović | 2 | 6 | 4
(Germany) J-L Struff | 7^{7} | 6
(Australia) J Millman | 6^{3} | 2
(Argentina) L Mayer | 3 | 3
(France) G Simon | 6 | 6
SE | (Latvia) E Gulbis | 7 | 6
5 | (United States) J Sock | 5 | 4
4 | (Greece) S Tsitsipas | 6 | 7^{7}
(France) J Chardy | 2 | 6^{3}
(Germany) P Gojowczyk | 1 | 7 | 6
(Chile) N Jarry | 6 | 5 | 3
Q | (Japan) T Daniel | 0 | 4
(Italy) A Seppi | 6 | 6
(Germany) M Marterer | 3 | 5
7 | (Russia) D Medvedev | 6 | 7

Second round
1 | (Switzerland) R Federer | 6 | 7
(Germany) J-L Struff | 3 | 5
(France) G Simon | 7^{7} | 7^{7}
SE | (Latvia) E Gulbis | 6^{4} | 6^{0}
4 | (Greece) S Tsitsipas | 6 | 6
(Germany) P Gojowczyk | 3 | 1
(Italy) A Seppi | 6^{5} | 2
7 | (Russia) D Medvedev | 7^{7} | 6

Quarterfinals
1 | (Switzerland) R Federer | 7^{7} | 4 | 6
(France) G Simon | 6^{1} | 6 | 4
4 | (Greece) S Tsitsipas | 4 | 6 | 3
7 | (Russia) D Medvedev | 6 | 3 | 6

Semifinals
1 | (Switzerland) R Federer | 6 | 6
7 | (Russia) D Medvedev | 1 | 4

=== Bottom half ===
First round
6 | (Italy) M Cecchinato | 4 | 2
WC | (Switzerland) H Laaksonen | 6 | 6
WC | (United States) T Fritz | 6 | 7
Q | (Serbia) L Đere | 0 | 5
Q | (Romania) M Copil | 6 | 7^{10}
(United States) R Harrison | 2 | 6^{8}
(Canada) D Shapovalov | 4 | 2
3 | (Croatia) M Čilić | 6 | 6
8 | (Spain) R Bautista Agut | 6 | 6
(Portugal) J Sousa | 4 | 3
LL | (Serbia) D Lajović | 6^{4} | 6 | 6
(France) A Mannarino | 7^{7} | 1 | 2
Q | (Australia) A Popyrin | 7^{7} | 6
(Australia) M Ebden | 6^{4} | 4
(Netherlands) R Haase | 4 | 5
2 | (Germany) A Zverev | 6 | 7

Second round
WC | (Switzerland) H Laaksonen | 2 | 5
WC | (United States) T Fritz | 6 | 7
Q | (Romania) M Copil | 7 | 7^{7}
3 | (Croatia) M Čilić | 5 | 6^{2}
8 | (Spain) R Bautista Agut | 6^{6} | 6 | 6
LL | (Serbia) D Lajović | 7^{8} | 3 | 3
Q | (Australia) A Popyrin | 4 | 4
2 | (Germany) A Zverev | 6 | 6

Quarterfinals
WC | (United States) T Fritz | 6^{6} | 5
Q | (Romania) M Copil | 7^{8} | 7
8 | (Spain) R Bautista Agut | 5 | 3
2 | (Germany) A Zverev | 7 | 6

Semifinals
Q | (Romania) M Copil | 6 | 6^{6} | 6
2 | (Germany) A Zverev | 3 | 7^{8} | 4

== Qualifying ==
=== Seeds ===
1. (Serbia) Dušan Lajović (qualifying competition, lucky loser)
2. (Tunisia) Malek Jaziri (qualifying competition)
3. (France) Benoît Paire (first round)
4. (Japan) Taro Daniel (qualified)
5. (Germany) Mischa Zverev (first round)
6. (Canada) Vasek Pospisil (qualifying competition)
7. (United States) Mackenzie McDonald (qualifying competition)
8. (Serbia) Laslo Đere (qualified)

=== Qualifiers ===
1. (Romania) Marius Copil
2. (Serbia) Laslo Đere
3. (Australia) Alexei Popyrin
4. (Japan) Taro Daniel

=== Lucky loser ===
1. (Serbia) Dušan Lajović

=== Qualifying draw ===
==== First qualifier ====
First round
1 | (Serbia) Dušan Lajović | 6 | 7
(Uzbekistan) Denis Istomin | 4 | 5
(Romania) Marius Copil | 7 | 7
5 | (Germany) Mischa Zverev | 5 | 5

Qualifying competition
1 | (Serbia) Dušan Lajović | 3 | 4
(Romania) Marius Copil | 6 | 6

==== Second qualifier ====
First round
2 | (Tunisia) Malek Jaziri | 6 | 6
WC | (Switzerland) Marc-Andrea Hüsler | 4 | 2
(Russia) Evgeny Donskoy | 0 | 6 | 3
8 | (Serbia) Laslo Đere | 6 | 4 | 6

Qualifying competition
2 | (Tunisia) Malek Jaziri | 2 | 3
8 | (Serbia) Laslo Đere | 6 | 6

==== Third qualifier ====
First round
3 | (France) Benoît Paire | 3 | 3
WC | (Australia) Alexei Popyrin | 6 | 6
(Spain) Marcel Granollers | 2 | 4
7 | (United States) Mackenzie McDonald | 6 | 6

Qualifying competition
WC | (Australia) Alexei Popyrin | 6 | 4 | 6
7 | (United States) Mackenzie McDonald | 4 | 6 | 4

==== Fourth qualifier ====
First round
4 | (Japan) Taro Daniel | 6 | 7
WC | (Switzerland) Sandro Ehrat | 1 | 5
(Spain) Guillermo García López | 2 | 2
6 | (Canada) Vasek Pospisil | 6 | 6

Qualifying competition
4 | (Japan) Taro Daniel | 7^{9} | 7^{7}
6 | (Canada) Vasek Pospisil | 6^{7} | 6^{2}
