= 2018 Gerry Weber Open =

- Date: 18–24 June
- Edition: 26th
- Category: ATP World Tour 500
- Draw: 32S / 16D
- Prize money: €2.116.915
- Surface: Grass
- Location: Halle, Germany
- Venue: Gerry Weber Stadion

Champions

Singles
- (Croatia) Borna Ćorić

Doubles
- (Poland) Łukasz Kubot / (Brazil) Marcelo Melo
← 2017 ·	Gerry Weber Open	· 2019 →

The 2018 Gerry Weber Open was a men's tennis tournament played on outdoor grass courts. It was the 26th edition of the event and part of the ATP World Tour 500 series of the 2018 ATP World Tour. It took place at the Gerry Weber Stadion in Halle, Germany, between 18 June and 24 June 2018. Unsedeed Borna Ćorić won the singles title.

== Points and prize money ==
=== Point distribution ===
Event	W	F	SF	QF	Round of 16	Round of 32	Q	Q2	Q1
Singles	500	300	180	90	45	0	20	10	0
Doubles	500	300	180	90	0	N/A	45	25	0

=== Prize money ===
Event	W	F	SF	QF	Round of 16	Round of 32	Q	Q2	Q1
Singles	€427.590	€209.630	€103.605	€53.645	€27.860	€14.690	€0	€3.250	€1,660
Doubles	€128.740	€63.030	€31.620	€16.230	€8.390	N/A	N/A	N/A	N/A

_{*per team}

== Singles main-draw entrants ==
=== Seeds ===
Country	Player	Rank^{1}	Seed
SUI	Roger Federer	2	1
GER	Alexander Zverev	3	2
AUT	Dominic Thiem	7	3
ESP	Roberto Bautista Agut	16	4
FRA	Lucas Pouille	17	5
GER	Philipp Kohlschreiber	22	6
JPN	Kei Nishikori	26	7
FRA	Richard Gasquet	30	8

- ^{1} Rankings are as of June 11, 2018

=== Other entrants ===
The following players received wildcards into the singles main draw:

- (Germany) Maximilian Marterer
- (Germany) Florian Mayer
- (Germany) Rudolf Molleker

The following players received as a special exempt:

- (Australia) Matthew Ebden

The following players received entry from the qualifying draw:

- (Germany) Matthias Bachinger
- (United States) Denis Kudla
- (Slovakia) Lukáš Lacko
- (Russia) Mikhail Youzhny

The following players received entry as lucky losers:

- (Italy) Matteo Berrettini
- (Georgia (country)) Nikoloz Basilashvili

=== Withdrawals ===
Before the tournament

- (South Korea) Chung Hyeon → replaced by (Germany) Jan-Lennard Struff
- (United States) John Isner → replaced by (Hungary) Márton Fucsovics
- (Spain) Albert Ramos Viñolas → replaced by (Italy) Matteo Berrettini
- (Russia) Andrey Rublev → replaced by (Tunisia) Malek Jaziri
- (Germany) Peter Gojowczyk → replaced by (Georgia (country)) Nikoloz Basilashvili

== Doubles main-draw entrants ==
=== Seeds ===
Country	Player	Country	Player	Rank^{1}	Seed
POL	Łukasz Kubot	BRA	Marcelo Melo	7	1
CRO	Nikola Mektić	AUT	Alexander Peya	38	2
PAK	Aisam-ul-Haq Qureshi	NED	Jean-Julien Rojer	43	3
CRO	Ivan Dodig	USA	Rajeev Ram	46	4

- ^{1} Rankings are as of June 11, 2018

=== Other entrants ===
The following pairs received wildcards into the doubles main draw:

- (Germany) Philipp Kohlschreiber / (Germany) Philipp Petzschner
- (Germany) Jan-Lennard Struff / (Germany) Tim Pütz

The following pair received entry from the qualifying draw:

- (Israel) Jonathan Erlich / (United States) Nicholas Monroe

== Finals ==
=== Singles ===
- (Croatia) Borna Ćorić defeated (Switzerland) Roger Federer, 7–6^{(8–6)}, 3–6, 6–2

=== Doubles ===
- (Poland) Łukasz Kubot / (Brazil) Marcelo Melo defeated (Germany) Alexander Zverev / (Germany) Mischa Zverev, 7–6^{(7–1)}, 6–4
