= 2018 Gerry Weber Open – Singles =

Singles
- 2018 Gerry Weber Open

Final
- Champion: (Croatia) Borna Ćorić
- Runner-up: (Switzerland) Roger Federer
- Score: 7–6^{(8–6)}, 3–6, 6–2

Details
- Draw: 32 (4 Q / 3 WC )
- Seeds: 8

Events
Singles	Doubles
- Gerry Weber Open

Borna Ćorić defeated the defending champion Roger Federer in the final, 7–6^{(8–6)}, 3–6, 6–2 to win the singles tennis title at the 2018 Halle Open. It was his first ATP 500 title. With Federer's loss, Rafael Nadal regained the world No. 1 ranking.

== Seeds ==
1. (Switzerland) Roger Federer (final)
2. (Germany) Alexander Zverev (first round)
3. (Austria) Dominic Thiem (second round)
4. (Spain) Roberto Bautista Agut (semifinals, retired)
5. (France) Lucas Pouille (first round)
6. (Germany) Philipp Kohlschreiber (second round)
7. (Japan) Kei Nishikori (second round)
8. (France) Richard Gasquet (first round)

== Draw ==
Key

- Q = Qualifier
- WC = Wild card
- LL = Lucky loser
- Alt = Alternate
- ITF = ITF entry
- PR = Protected ranking
- SR = Special ranking
- SE = Special exempt
- JE = Junior exempt
- JR = Junior Accelerator Programme entrant
- CO = College Accelerator Programme entrant
- NG = Next Gen Accelerator Program entrant
- w/o = Walkover
- r = Retired
- d = Defaulted

=== Finals ===
Semifinals
1	(Switzerland) Roger Federer	7^{7}	7
Q	(United States) Denis Kudla	6^{1}	5
4	(Spain) Roberto Bautista Agut	3^{r}
(Croatia) Borna Ćorić	2

Finals
1	(Switzerland) Roger Federer	6^{6}	6	2
(Croatia) Borna Ćorić	7^{8}	3	6

=== Top half ===
First round
1	(Switzerland) R Federer	6	6
(Slovenia) A Bedene	3	4
(France) B Paire	7	7^{7}
(United States) S Johnson	5	6^{5}
(Tunisia) M Jaziri	0	6^{2}
SE	(Australia) M Ebden	6	7^{7}
(Hungary) M Fucsovics	6	3	1^{r}
6	(Germany) P Kohlschreiber	4	6	2
3	(Austria) D Thiem	7^{7}	6
Q	(Russia) M Youzhny	6^{5}	2
WC	(Germany) M Marterer	4	7	3
(Japan) Y Sugita	6	5	6
Q	(Slovakia) L Lacko	4	4
Q	(United States) D Kudla	6	6
(Greece) S Tsitsipas	6	7^{7}
5	(France) L Pouille	2	6^{3}

Second round
1	(Switzerland) R Federer	6	3	7^{9}
(France) B Paire	3	6	6^{7}
SE	(Australia) M Ebden	4	6	6
6	(Germany) P Kohlschreiber	6	1	2
3	(Austria) D Thiem	2	5
(Japan) Y Sugita	6	7
Q	(United States) D Kudla	6	6
(Greece) S Tsitsipas	3	4

Quarterfinals
1	(Switzerland) R Federer	7^{7}	7
SE	(Australia) M Ebden	6^{2}	5
(Japan) Y Sugita	2	5
Q	(United States) D Kudla	6	7

Semifinals
1	(Switzerland) R Federer	7^{7}	7
Q	(United States) D Kudla	6^{1}	5

=== Bottom half ===
First round
7	(Japan) K Nishikori	6	7^{7}
Q	(Germany) M Bachinger	3	6^{3}
(Germany) M Zverev	6^{5}	3
(Russia) K Khachanov	7^{7}	6
(Netherlands) R Haase	4	7	6
(Portugal) J Sousa	6	5	4
(Germany) J-L Struff	4	1
4	(Spain) R Bautista Agut	6	6
8	(France) R Gasquet	2	2
WC	(Germany) F Mayer	6	6
(Italy) A Seppi	6	7
LL	(Italy) M Berrettini	3	5
LL	(Georgia (country)) N Basilashvili	6	7^{7}
WC	(Germany) R Molleker	4	6^{5}
(Croatia) B Ćorić	6	6
2	(Germany) A Zverev	1	4

Second round
7	(Japan) K Nishikori	2	2
(Russia) K Khachanov	6	6
(Netherlands) R Haase	4	5
4	(Spain) R Bautista Agut	6	7
WC	(Germany) F Mayer	2	4
(Italy) A Seppi	6	6
LL	(Georgia (country)) N Basilashvili	4	2
(Croatia) B Ćorić	6	6

Quarterfinals
(Russia) K Khachanov	3	7^{7}	3
4	(Spain) R Bautista Agut	6	6^{3}	6
(Italy) A Seppi	5	3
(Croatia) B Ćorić	7	6

Semifinals
4	(Spain) R Bautista Agut	3^{r}
(Croatia) B Ćorić	2

== Qualifying ==
=== Seeds ===
1. (France) Gilles Simon (first round)
2. (Argentina) Guido Pella (first round)
3. (Russia) Evgeny Donskoy (first round)
4. (Italy) Matteo Berrettini (qualifying competition, lucky loser)
5. (Georgia (country)) Nikoloz Basilashvili (qualifying competition, lucky loser)
6. (Canada) Vasek Pospisil (first round)
7. (Croatia) Ivo Karlović (first round)
8. (Russia) Mikhail Youzhny (qualified)

=== Qualifiers ===
1. (Germany) Matthias Bachinger
2. (United States) Denis Kudla
3. (Slovakia) Lukáš Lacko
4. (Russia) Mikhail Youzhny

=== Lucky losers ===
1. (Italy) Matteo Berrettini
2. (Georgia (country)) Nikoloz Basilashvili

=== Qualifying draw ===
==== First qualifier ====
First round
1	(France) Gilles Simon	6	6^{7}	6^{5}
(Uzbekistan) Denis Istomin	4	7^{9}	7^{7}
WC	(Germany) Matthias Bachinger	5	7^{7}	7
6	(Canada) Vasek Pospisil	7	6^{3}	5

Qualifying competition
(Uzbekistan) Denis Istomin	5	2
WC	(Germany) Matthias Bachinger	7	6

==== Second qualifier ====
First round
2	(Argentina) Guido Pella	4	3
(United States) Denis Kudla	6	6
(Sweden) Elias Ymer	4	3
5	(Georgia (country)) Nikoloz Basilashvili	6	6

Qualifying competition
(United States) Denis Kudla	6	6
5	(Georgia (country)) Nikoloz Basilashvili	2	4

==== Third qualifier ====
First round
3	(Russia) Evgeny Donskoy	6	5	1
WC	(Germany) Yannick Maden	2	7	6
(Slovakia) Lukáš Lacko	7^{7}	7^{7}
7	(Croatia) Ivo Karlović	6^{5}	6^{2}

Qualifying competition
WC	(Germany) Yannick Maden	2	3
(Slovakia) Lukáš Lacko	6	6

==== Fourth qualifier ====
First round
4	(Italy) Matteo Berrettini	6^{5}	7^{7}	7^{7}
WC	(Germany) Dustin Brown	7^{7}	6^{5}	6^{4}
(Belgium) Ruben Bemelmans	6^{4}	2
8	(Russia) Mikhail Youzhny	7^{7}	6

Qualifying competition
4	(Italy) Matteo Berrettini	3	6^{7}
8	(Russia) Mikhail Youzhny	6	7^{9}
