= 2018 ABN AMRO World Tennis Tournament =

- Date: 12–18 February
- Edition: 45th
- Category: ATP World Tour 500
- Draw: 32S / 16D
- Prize money: €1,724,930
- Surface: Hard / indoor
- Location: Rotterdam, Netherlands
- Venue: Rotterdam Ahoy

Champions

Singles
- (Switzerland) Roger Federer

Doubles
- (France) Pierre-Hugues Herbert / (France) Nicolas Mahut

Wheelchair singles
- (Argentina) Gustavo Fernández

Wheelchair doubles
- (Belgium) Joachim Gérard / (Sweden) Stefan Olsson
- Rotterdam Open

The 2018 ABN AMRO World Tennis Tournament (or Rotterdam Open) was a men's tennis tournament played on indoor hard courts. It took place at the Rotterdam Ahoy arena in the Dutch city of Rotterdam, between 12 and 18 February 2018. It was the 45th edition of the tournament, and part of the ATP World Tour 500 series of the 2018 ATP World Tour. The tournament also includes a Men's Wheelchair Tennis Singles and Doubles draw. The wheelchair tennis event was an ITF-1 level tournament, with a total of $32,000 prize money.

== Finals ==
=== Singles ===
- (Switzerland) Roger Federer defeated (Bulgaria) Grigor Dimitrov, 6–2, 6–2

=== Doubles ===
- (France) Pierre-Hugues Herbert / (France) Nicolas Mahut defeated (Austria) Oliver Marach / (Croatia) Mate Pavić, 2–6, 6–2, [10–7]

== Points and prize money ==
=== Point distribution ===
Event	W	F	SF	QF	Round of 16	Round of 32	Q	Q2	Q1
Singles	500	300	180	90	45	0	20	10	0
Doubles	500	300	180	90	0	—N/a	45	25	0

=== Prize money ===
Event	W	F	SF	QF	Round of 16	Round of 32^{1}	Q2	Q1
Singles	€401,580	€196,875	€99,065	€50,380	€26,165	€13,800	€3,050	€1,555
Doubles *	€120,910	€59,200	€29,690	€15,240	€7,880	—N/a	—N/a	—N/a

_{^{1} Qualifiers prize money is also the Round of 32 prize money}
_{* per team}

== Singles main-draw entrants ==
=== Seeds ===
Country	Player	Ranking^{1}	Seed
SUI	Roger Federer	2	1
BUL	Grigor Dimitrov	4	2
GER	Alexander Zverev	5	3
BEL	David Goffin	7	4
SUI	Stan Wawrinka	15	5
CZE	Tomáš Berdych	16	6
FRA	Lucas Pouille	17	7
~~FRA~~	~~Jo-Wilfried Tsonga~~	~~19~~	~~8~~
LUX	Gilles Müller	28	9

- ^{1} Rankings as of February 5, 2018.

=== Other entrants ===
The following players received wildcards into the main draw:

- (Canada) Félix Auger-Aliassime
- (Netherlands) Thiemo de Bakker
- (Switzerland) Roger Federer
- (Netherlands) Tallon Griekspoor

The following player received entry as a special exempt:

- (Romania) Marius Copil

The following players received entry from the qualifying draw:

- (Belgium) Ruben Bemelmans
- (France) Pierre-Hugues Herbert
- (Slovakia) Martin Kližan
- (Russia) Daniil Medvedev

The following players received entry as lucky losers:

- (France) Nicolas Mahut
- (Italy) Andreas Seppi

=== Withdrawals ===
Before the tournament

- (Spain) Roberto Bautista Agut → replaced by (Portugal) João Sousa
- (Australia) Nick Kyrgios → replaced by (Serbia) Viktor Troicki
- (France) Jo-Wilfried Tsonga → replaced by (Italy) Andreas Seppi
- (France) Benoît Paire → replaced by (France) Nicolas Mahut

During the tournament

- (Czech Republic) Tomáš Berdych

=== Retirements ===
- (France) Richard Gasquet
- (Belgium) David Goffin

== Doubles main-draw entrants ==
=== Seeds ===
Country	Player	Country	Player	Rank^{1}	Seed
POL	Łukasz Kubot	BRA	Marcelo Melo	2	1
AUT	Oliver Marach	CRO	Mate Pavić	11	2
FRA	Pierre-Hugues Herbert	FRA	Nicolas Mahut	20	3
NED	Jean-Julien Rojer	ROU	Horia Tecău	23	4

- ^{1} Rankings as of February 5, 2018.

=== Other entrants ===
The following pairs received wildcards into the doubles main draw:

- (Netherlands) Robin Haase / (Netherlands) Matwé Middelkoop
- (Netherlands) Jasper Smit / (Netherlands) Jesse Timmermans

The following pair received entry from the qualifying draw:

- (Netherlands) Sander Arends / (Netherlands) Thiemo de Bakker
