= 2018 Swiss Indoors =

- Date: 22–28 October
- Edition: 49th
- Category: ATP World Tour 500
- Draw: 32S / 16D
- Prize money: €1,984,420
- Surface: Hard / indoor
- Location: Basel, Switzerland
- Venue: St. Jakobshalle

Champions

Singles
- (Switzerland) Roger Federer

Doubles
- (United Kingdom) Dominic Inglot / (Croatia) Franko Škugor
← 2017 ·	Swiss Indoors	· 2019 →

The 2018 Swiss Indoors was a men's tennis tournament played on indoor hard courts. It was the 49th edition of the tournament, and part of the 500 series of the 2018 ATP World Tour. It was held at the St. Jakobshalle in Basel, Switzerland, from 22 October through 28 October 2018. First-seeded Roger Federer won his ninth singles title at the event.

== Finals ==
=== Singles ===
- (Switzerland) Roger Federer defeated (Romania) Marius Copil, 7–6^{(7–5)}, 6–4

=== Doubles ===
- (United Kingdom) Dominic Inglot / (Croatia) Franko Škugor defeated (Germany) Alexander Zverev / (Germany) Mischa Zverev, 6–2, 7–5

== Points and prize money ==
=== Point distribution ===
Event	W	F	SF	QF	Round of 16	Round of 32	Q	Q2	Q1
Singles	500	300	180	90	45	0	20	10	0
Doubles	500	300	180	90	0	—	45	25	0

== Singles main-draw entrants ==
=== Seeds ===
Country	Player	Rank^{1}	Seed
SUI	Roger Federer	3	1
GER	Alexander Zverev	5	2
CRO	Marin Čilić	6	3
GRE	Stefanos Tsitsipas	16	4
USA	Jack Sock	18	5
ITA	Marco Cecchinato	19	6
RUS	Daniil Medvedev	21	7
ESP	Roberto Bautista Agut	25	8

- Rankings are as of October 15, 2018

=== Other entrants ===
The following players received wildcards into the singles main draw:

- (United States) Taylor Fritz
- (Switzerland) Henri Laaksonen
- (United States) Jack Sock

The following player received entry as a special exempt:

- (Latvia) Ernests Gulbis

The following players received entry from the qualifying draw:

- (Romania) Marius Copil
- (Japan) Taro Daniel
- (Serbia) Laslo Đere
- (Australia) Alexei Popyrin

The following player received entry as a lucky loser:

- (Serbia) Dušan Lajović

=== Withdrawals ===
Before the tournament

- (Argentina) Juan Martín del Potro → replaced by (Germany) Maximilian Marterer
- (Belgium) David Goffin → replaced by (United States) Ryan Harrison
- (Switzerland) Stan Wawrinka → replaced by (Serbia) Dušan Lajović

== Doubles main-draw entrants ==
=== Seeds ===
Country	Player	Country	Player	Rank^{1}	Seed
RSA	Raven Klaasen	NZL	Michael Venus	30	1
~~CRO~~	~~Ivan Dodig~~	~~JPN~~	~~Ben McLachlan~~	~~43~~	~~2~~
NED	Jean-Julien Rojer	ROU	Horia Tecău	52	3
IND	Rohan Bopanna	ESP	Marcel Granollers	55	4

- Rankings are as of October 15, 2018

=== Other entrants ===
The following pairs received wildcards into the doubles main draw:

- (Switzerland) Marc-Andrea Hüsler / (Netherlands) Sem Verbeek
- (Switzerland) Henri Laaksonen / (Switzerland) Luca Margaroli

The following pair received entry from the qualifying draw:

- (Spain) Guillermo García López / (Spain) David Marrero

The following pair received entry as lucky losers:

- (Sweden) Robert Lindstedt / (France) Fabrice Martin

=== Withdrawals ===
Before the tournament

- (Croatia) Ivan Dodig
