= 2018 ATP Finals =

- Date: 11–18 November
- Edition: 49th (singles) / 44th (doubles)
- Category: ATP Finals
- Draw: 8S/8D
- Prize money: $8,500,000
- Surface: Hard / indoor
- Location: London, United Kingdom
- Venue: The O_{2} Arena

Champions

Singles
- (Germany) Alexander Zverev

Doubles
- (United States) Mike Bryan / (United States) Jack Sock
- ATP Finals

The 2018 ATP Finals (also known as the 2018 Nitto ATP Finals for Nitto sponsorship) was a men's tennis year-end tournament that took place at the O_{2} Arena in London, United Kingdom, from 11 to 18 November 2018. It was the season-ending event for the highest-ranked singles players and doubles teams on the 2018 ATP World Tour.

== Finals ==
=== Singles ===
(Germany) Alexander Zverev defeated (Serbia) Novak Djokovic, 6–4, 6–3

- It was Zverev's 4th title of the year and 10th of his career. It was his first win at the event.

=== Doubles ===
(United States) Mike Bryan / (United States) Jack Sock defeated (France) Pierre-Hugues Herbert / (France) Nicolas Mahut, 5–7, 6–1, [13–11]

== Tournament ==
The 2018 ATP Finals took place from 11 to 18 November at the O_{2} Arena in London, United Kingdom. It was the 49th edition of the tournament (44th in doubles). The tournament was run by the Association of Tennis Professionals (ATP) and was part of the 2018 ATP World Tour. The event took on indoor hard courts. It served as the season-ending championships for players on the ATP Tour. The eight players who qualified for the event were split into two groups of four. During this stage, players competed in a round-robin format (meaning players played against all the other players in their group). The two players with the best results in each group progressed to the semifinals, where the winners of a group faced the runners-up of the other group. This stage, however, was a knock-out stage. The doubles competition used the same format.

== Points and prize money ==
| Stage | Singles | Doubles^{1} | Points |
|---|---|---|---|
| Champion | RR + $1,280,000 | RR + $200,000 | RR + 900 |
| Runner-up | RR + $620,000 | RR + $103,000 | RR + 400 |
| Round robin win per match | $203,000 | $38,000 | 200 |
| Participation fee | $203,000 | $100,000 | —N/a |
| Alternates | $110,000 | $38,000 | —N/a |

Ref:

- RR is points or prize money won in the round robin stage.
- ^{1} Prize money for doubles is per team.
- An undefeated champion would earn the maximum 1,500 points, and $2,712,000 in singles or $517,000 in doubles.

== Qualification ==
=== Singles ===
Eight players compete at the tournament, with two named alternates. Players receive places in the following order of precedence:

1. First, the top 7 players in the ATP Race to London on the Monday after the final tournament of the ATP World Tour, that is, after the 2018 Paris Masters.
2. Second, up to two 2018 Grand Slam tournament winners ranked anywhere 8th-20th, in ranking order
3. Third, the eighth ranked player in the ATP rankings

In the event of this totaling more than 8 players, those lower down in the selection order become the alternates. If further alternates are needed, these players are selected by the ATP.

Provisional rankings are published weekly as the ATP Race to London, coinciding with the 52-week rolling ATP rankings on the date of selection. Points are accumulated in Grand Slam, ATP World Tour, ATP Challenger Tour and ITF Futures tournaments from the 52 weeks prior to the selection date, with points from the previous years Tour Finals excluded. Players accrue points across 18 tournaments, usually made up of:

- The 4 Grand Slam tournaments
- The 8 mandatory ATP Masters tournaments
- The best results from any 6 other tournaments that carry ranking points

All players must include the ranking points for mandatory Masters tournaments for which they are on the original acceptance list and for all Grand Slams for which they would be eligible, even if they do not compete (in which case they receive zero points). Furthermore, players who finished 2016 in the world's top 30 are commitment players who must (if not injured) include points for the 8 mandatory Masters tournament regardless of whether they enter, and who must compete in at least 4 ATP 500 tournaments (though the Monte Carlo Masters may count to this total), of which one must take place after the US Open. Zero point scores may also be taken from withdrawals by non-injured players from ATP 500 tournaments according to certain other conditions outlined by the ATP. Beyond these rules, however, a player may substitute his next best tournament result for missed Masters and Grand Slam tournaments.

Players may have their ATP World Tour Masters 1000 commitment reduced by one tournament, by reaching each of the following milestones:

1. 600 tour level matches (as of January 1, 2018), including matches from Challengers and Futures played before year 2011;
2. 12 years of service;
3. 31 years of age (as of January 1, 2018).

If a player satisfies all three of these conditions, their mandatory ATP World Tour Masters 1000 commitment is dropped entirely. Players must be in good standing as defined by the ATP as to avail of the reduced commitment.

=== Doubles ===
Eight teams compete at the tournament, with one named alternates. The eight competing teams receive places according to the same order of precedence as in Singles. The named alternate will be offered first to any unaccepted teams in the selection order, then to the highest ranked unaccepted team, and then to a team selected by the ATP. Points are accumulated in the same competitions as for the Singles tournament. However, for Doubles teams there are no commitment tournaments, so teams are ranked according to their 18 highest points scoring results from any tournaments.

== Qualified players ==
=== Singles ===
| # | Players | Points | Tourn. | Date Qualified |
|---|---|---|---|---|
| 1 | (Serbia) Novak Djokovic | 8,045 | 14 | 8 September |
| inj. | (Spain) Rafael Nadal | 7,480 | 9 | 11 August |
| 2 | (Switzerland) Roger Federer | 6,020 | 10 | 8 September |
| inj. | (Argentina) Juan Martín del Potro | 5,300 | 19 | 3 October |
| 3 | (Germany) Alexander Zverev | 5,085 | 18 | 12 October |
| 4 | (South Africa) Kevin Anderson | 4,310 | 20 | 28 October |
| 5 | (Croatia) Marin Čilić | 4,050 | 18 | 2 November |
| 6 | (Austria) Dominic Thiem | 3,895 | 23 | 2 November |
| 7 | (Japan) Kei Nishikori | 3,390 | 21 | 3 November |
| 8 | (United States) John Isner | 3,155 | 22 | 5 November |

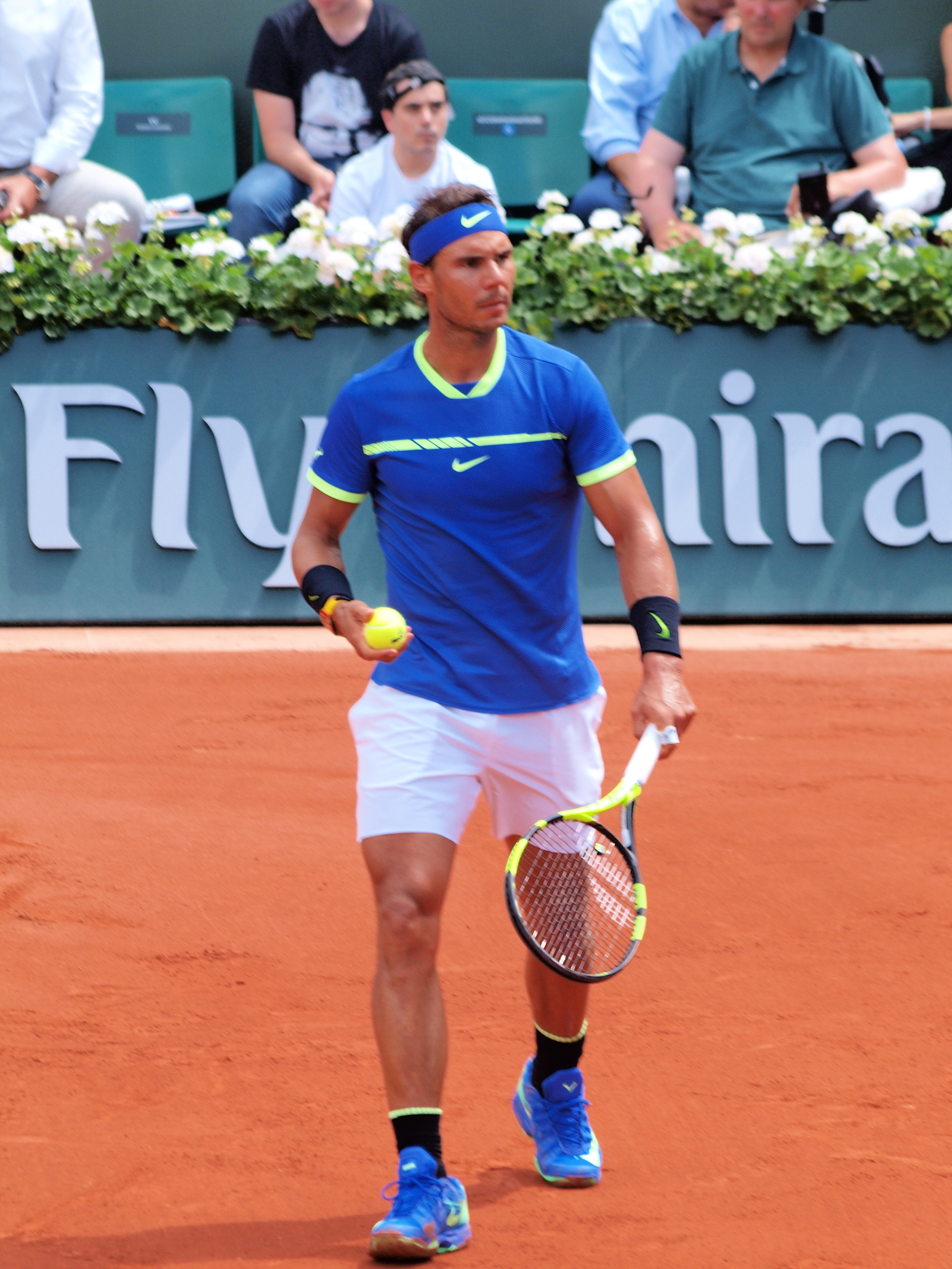
Nadal won his 17th slam at the French Open

On August 11, Rafael Nadal became the first qualifier to the event.

Rafael Nadal formally began his season at the Australian Open, Nadal faced Marin Čilić in the quarterfinal, but retired in the fifth set due to a hip injury. Nadal withdrew from the Mexican Open, Indian Wells Masters, and Miami Open due to an injury. At the Monte Carlo Masters, Nadal successfully defended his title, won a record-breaking 31st Masters title and his 11th title in Monte Carlo, beating Kei Nishikori in the final. Nadal went on to win his 11th title in Barcelona Open, defeating Stefanos Tsitsipas in straight sets in the final, becoming the first player in the open era to win 400 matches on both clay and hard. Fresh after achieving the 'Undecima' at Monte Carlo and Barcelona, Nadal failed to defend his title at the Mutua Madrid Open, when he lost in straight sets to Dominic Thiem in the quarterfinals, ending his 21-match and record 50-set winning streaks on clay. At the Italian Open, Nadal captured his 8th title in the event, defeating Alexander Zverev in three sets, thus overtaking John McEnroe in the fourth place on the list of most titles won in the Open Era. Then at the French Open, Nadal won his 17th Grand Slam title, beating Dominic Thiem in the final in three sets.

Going into Wimbledon Championships, Nadal reached the semifinals for the first time since 2011, where he faced long-time rival Novak Djokovic, in a match that lasted 5 hours and 17 minutes, spread over two days, becoming the second-longest Wimbledon semifinal in history. Djokovic defeated Nadal in five sets with the fifth set being 10–8. At the Rogers Cup, Nadal defeated Stefanos Tsitsipas in the final to win a record-extending 33rd Masters 1000 title. Nadal was the top seed during his title defense at the US Open. However, he retired in his semi-final matchup against Juan Martín del Potro due to knee pain. He then skipped the Asian Swing due to the same injury and the Rolex Paris Masters due to an abdominal injury. On November 5, he confirmed his withdrawal from the ATP Finals due to an ankle injury.

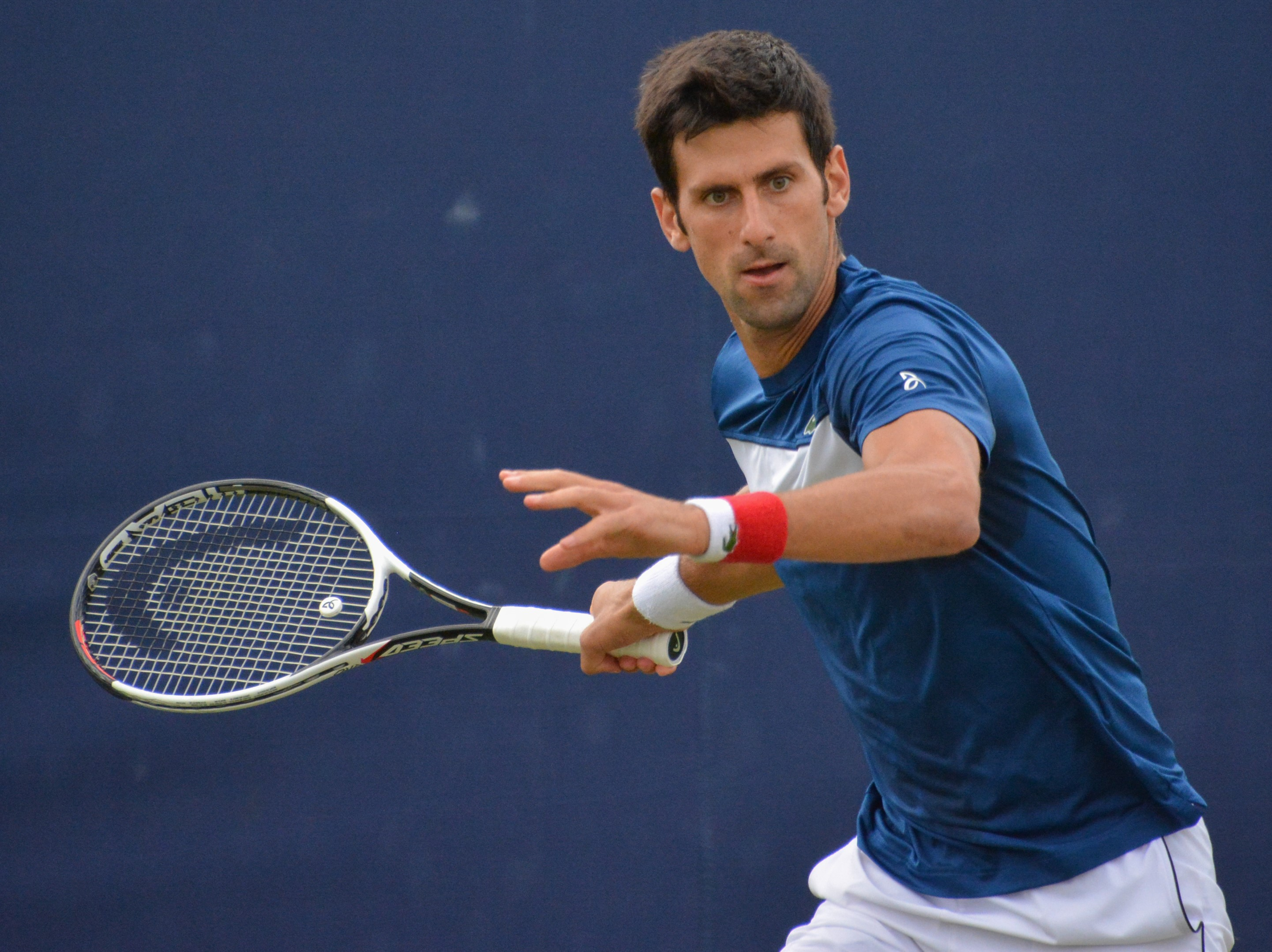
Djokovic won two slams in the season.

On September 8, Novak Djokovic and Roger Federer qualified for the event.

Novak Djokovic started off with a fourth round loss at the Australian Open, losing to Chung Hyeon from South Korea in three close sets. He then underwent surgery on his elbow, a week later. However, he surprisingly played at the Masters events of the Indian Wells Masters and Miami Open and lost in his opening round matches to Taro Daniel and Benoît Paire, respectively. He then competed at the Monte Carlo Rolex Masters and was able to reach the third round losing to Dominic Thiem. However, he suffered another early exit, this time in Barcelona Open to Martin Kližan in the second round. Djokovic struggle continued at the Mutua Madrid Open in a second round loss to Kyle Edmund in three sets. At the Italian Open, Djokovic was able to reach his first semifinal of the year, losing to eventual champion Rafael Nadal in straight sets. His resurgent form continued when he reached the quarterfinals of the French Open, but was upset by Marco Cecchinato in four sets.

He had a strong start to the grass court season at the Queen's Club Championship, reaching the final without dropping a set, but lost to top seed Marin Čilić despite having a championship point. Djokovic, then, entered the Wimbledon Championships and, after defeating Nadal 10–8 in fifth set in the semifinal, he was able to claim his first title in over a year by defeating Kevin Anderson in straight sets. After a triumphant grass season, Djokovic started his US Open Series with a third round showing at the Rogers Cup, losing against eventual runner-up Stefanos Tsitsipas. Afterwards, he returned to play the Western & Southern Open for the first time in three years. Here he faced Roger Federer in the final and defeated him to win his first Cincinnati Masters title convincingly in straight sets. With this victory, Djokovic became the first and only player in tennis history to complete the career Golden Masters—a feat achieved by winning all nine ATP Masters 1000 events at least once in one's career. At the US Open, he was able to reach the final facing #3 seed Juan Martín del Potro. He defeated del Potro in straight sets to win his third US Open title and second Grand Slam title of the year. Seeded second at the Shanghai Rolex Masters, he claimed his fourth Shanghai title when he defeated Borna Ćorić in the final and did not drop a set all tournament. Finally at the Rolex Paris Masters he defeated João Sousa, Damir Džumhur, Marin Čilić, and Roger Federer en route to the final, where he lost in straight sets to Karen Khachanov.

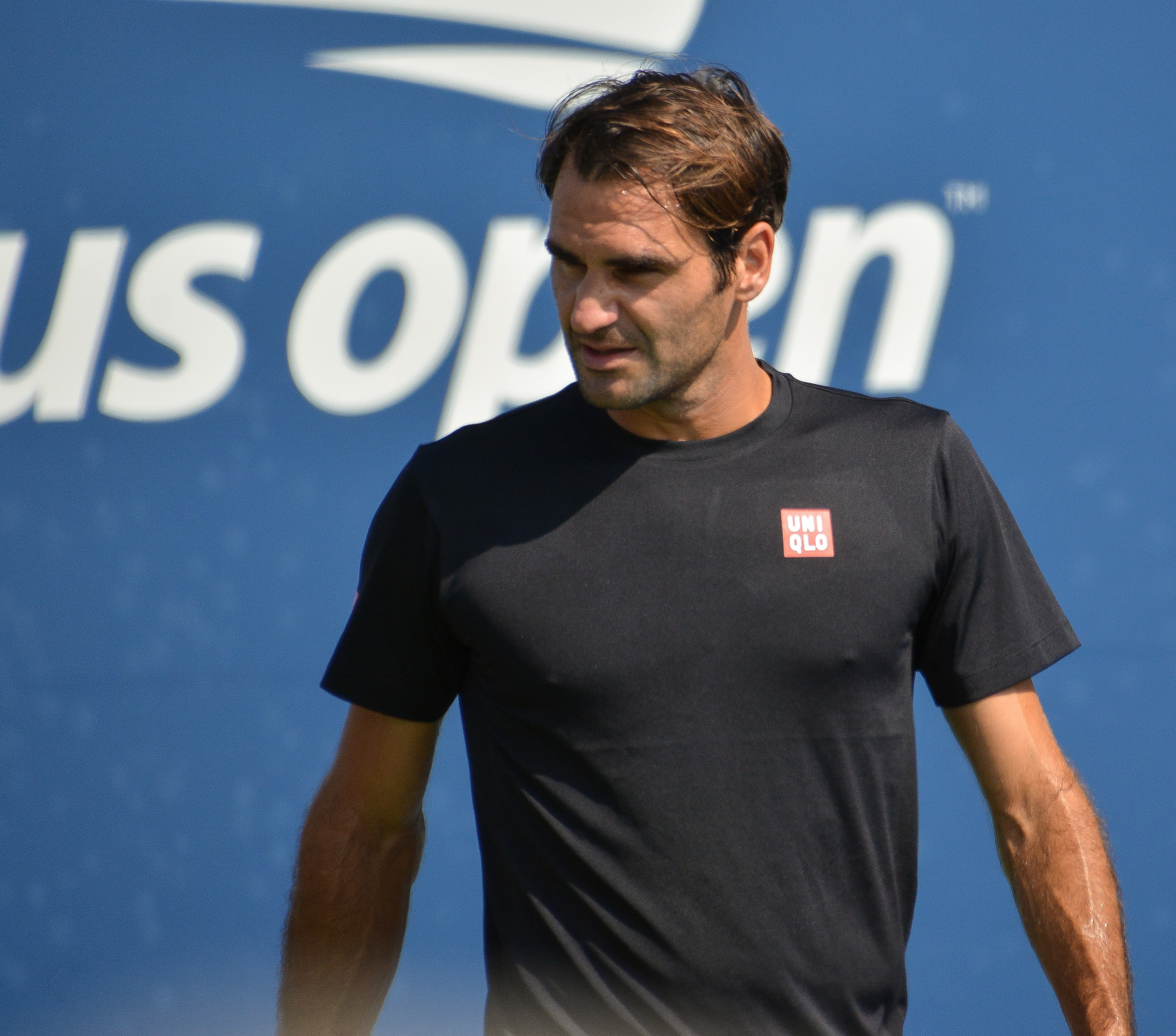
Federer claimed his 20th slam title at the Australian Open.

Roger Federer started his season winning the Hopman Cup partnering with Belinda Bencic. At the Australian Open, Federer reached the final without dropping a set, and successfully defended his title beating Marin Čilić in a five-set final. This was Federer's sixth title at the Australian Open, equaling the record held by Roy Emerson and Novak Djokovic, as well as becoming the first man to win twenty Grand Slam titles. Federer continued his good start when he won his third Rotterdam Open title to return to No. 1 in the ATP rankings, defeating Grigor Dimitrov in straight sets in the final. He then entered the Indian Wells Masters, where he reached the final and despite holding three championship points, Federer was defeated by Juan Martín del Potro in a close three-set final. At the Miami Open, Federer lost in his opening match to Thanasi Kokkinakis, resulting to him losing the no. 1 ranking. He then skipped the European clay court season for the second consecutive season.

At the grass season, Federer claimed his third title of the year at the MercedesCup defeating Milos Raonic in the final in straight sets. As the defending champion at the Gerry Weber Open, he reached the final, but was upset by Borna Ćorić in three sets. At the Wimbledon Championships, where he was the defending champion, his run was ended by South African Kevin Anderson in the quarterfinals in five sets, despite winning the first two sets and having a match point in the third set. Federer next played in Western & Southern Open where he lost in the final to Djokovic in straight sets. The loss ended Federer's run of 100 consecutive service holds and 14 match winning streak in Cincinnati. Federer entered the US Open as the second seed but was upset by John Millman in the 4th round. Federer then played at the Shanghai Rolex Masters as the defending champion but lost in the semifinals to Ćorić in straight sets. He came into the Swiss Indoors as the defending champion, he defeated qualifier Marius Copil in the final to claim his fourth title of the year. He then competed at the Rolex Paris Masters, where he fell in the semifinals to Djokovic despite not getting his serve broken.

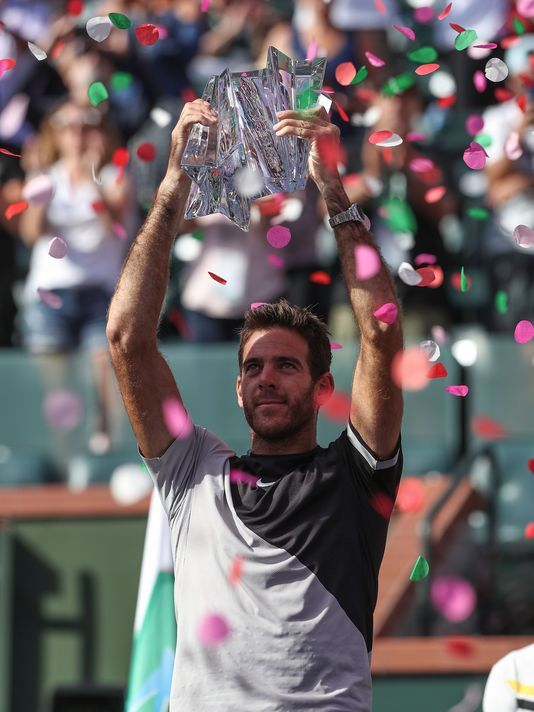
Del Potro won his first Masters title.

On October 3, Juan Martín del Potro became the fourth qualifier for the event.

Juan Martín del Potro started the season at the ASB Classic reaching the final, where he lost to Roberto Bautista Agut in three sets. In the Australian Open he lost in the third round against Tomáš Berdych. Despite this, he returned to the top ten ranked world no 9, the first time since August 2014. Del Potro then competed at the Delray Beach Open. However, he lost to eventual champion Frances Tiafoe in the second round. He then won the Abierto Mexicano Telcel, defeating Kevin Anderson in straight sets to obtain his 21st title. He then went to win his first Masters event title at the BNP Paribas Open defeating defending champion and world No.1 Roger Federer in the final. He continued his good run at the Miami Open, but was stopped by eventual champion John Isner in the semifinals. del Potro's French Open preparation was lackluster losing the third rounds of Mutua Madrid Open and Italian Open to Dušan Lajović and David Goffin, respectively. Despite the poor preparation, he was able to reach the semifinals losing to eventual champion Rafael Nadal in straight sets.

At Wimbledon, Del Potro reached the quarterfinals, where he faced Nadal once again and lost in 5 sets. Del Potro then competed at the Los Cabos Open, where he reached the final but lost to Fabio Fognini. At the Western & Southern Open he fell to David Goffin in the quarterfinals. Entering the US Open seeded third, del Potro faced Nadal in the semifinals for the third consecutive slam but this time he was victorious, when Nadal retired after Del Potro was leading two sets to love to reach his second slam final. In the final, he was defeated by two-time champion Novak Djokovic. Del Potro entered the China Open, where he faced unseeded Nikoloz Basilashvili in the final, but ended up losing in straight sets. He then competed in the Shanghai Rolex Masters, where he was forced to retire against Borna Ćorić in the third round, due to a knee injury. It was then revealed that he had fractured his right patella, which made him pull out for the rest of the season. On November 3, he confirmed he would withdraw from the event.

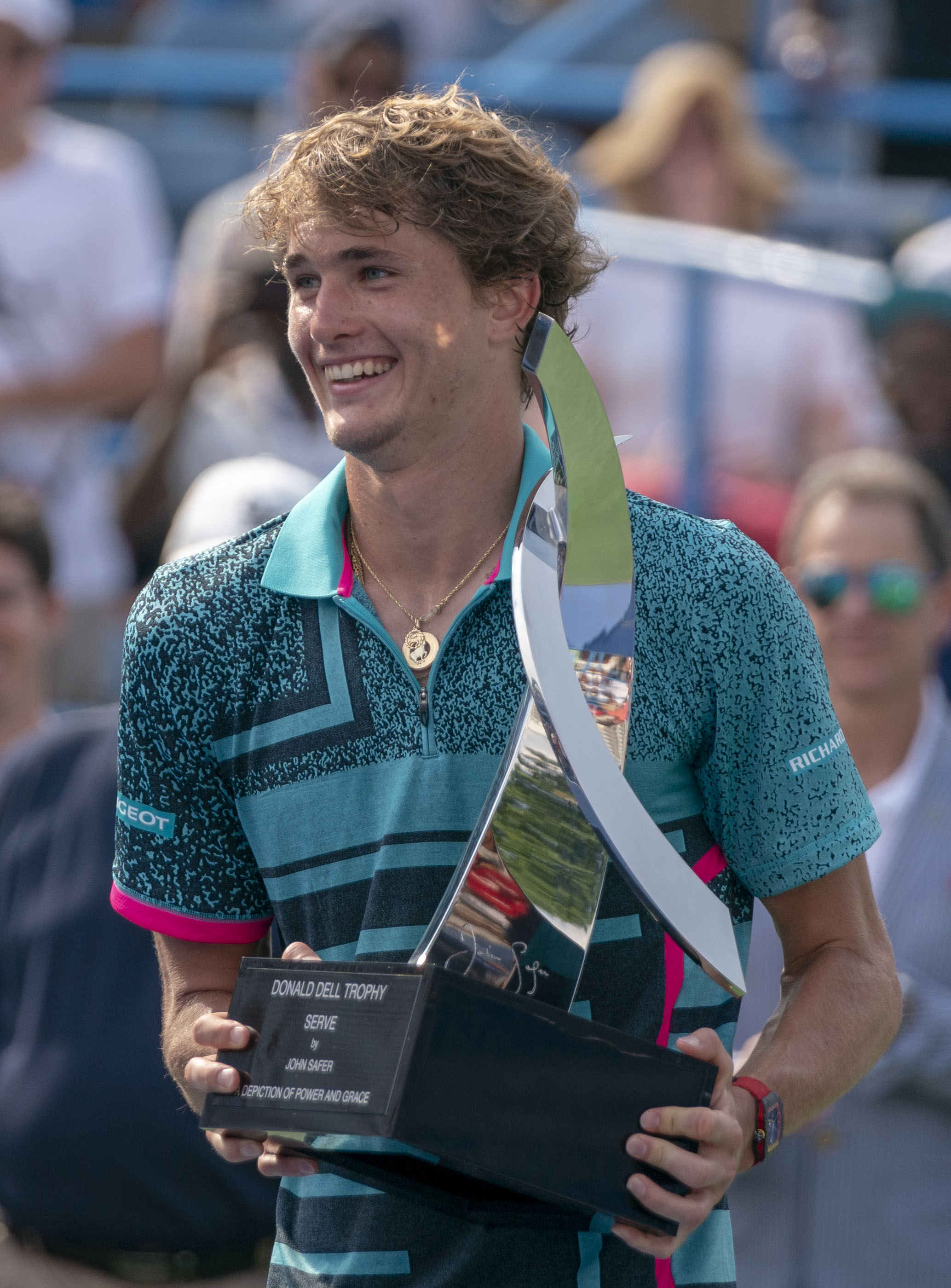
Zverev won the Madrid Open title.

On October 12, Alexander Zverev became the fifth player to qualify.

Alexander Zverev played for Germany at the Hopman Cup alongside Angelique Kerber but lost in the final to Switzerland. At the Australian Open, he made it to the third round, before being beaten in five sets by world No. 59 Chung Hyeon. At the Rotterdam Open, Zverev was seeded third. However, he was upset in straight sets in the second round by Andreas Seppi. He returned to action at the Abierto Mexicano Telcel, where he reached the semifinals, before losing to eventual champion Juan Martín del Potro in straight sets. He then had a disappointing loss at the first Masters event of the year at the Indian Wells Masters in the second round to João Sousa, despite having break leads in the first and third sets. Zverev then bounced back at the Miami Open when he made his third Masters event final. He faced John Isner in the final, which he lost in three sets, marking his first Masters event final loss. At the beginning of the clay season, he reached the semifinals at the Monte-Carlo Rolex Masters, where he lost to Kei Nishikori in three sets. He then followed it up by reaching the final of his next three events, winning the BMW Open successfully defending his title against Philipp Kohlschreiber, winning his third Masters event title at the Mutua Madrid Open defeating Dominic Thiem (without dropping a set all tournament) and losing in the final of the Italian Open to Rafael Nadal ending Zverev's 13-match winning streak. At the French Open, he was able to reach his first slam quarterfinal but lost to Thiem in straight sets.

At the grass season, he fell in the first round of the Gerry Weber Open to eventual champion Borna Ćorić and the third round of the Wimbledon Championships to Ernests Gulbis in five sets. Going into the hard court season, Zverev successfully defended his title in Citi Open. He reached the final and defeated 19-year-old Alex de Minaur to claim his second consecutive Washington title. He failed to defend his title at the Rogers Cup losing in the quarterfinal to Stefanos Tsitsipas, despite having two match points. He then followed it up with an upset loss to Robin Haase in his opening match at the Western & Southern Open. At the US Open, Zverev's slam woes continues as he lost in the third round to compatriot Philipp Kohlschreiber in four sets. Zverev then entered the China Open, he was upset by Malek Jaziri in three sets in the second round. He then competed at the Shanghai Rolex Masters, where he reached the semifinals, losing to Novak Djokovic. He also reached the semifinals of the Swiss Indoors falling to qualifier Marius Copil. At the Rolex Paris Masters, he fell in two quick sets to Karen Khachanov in the quarterfinals.

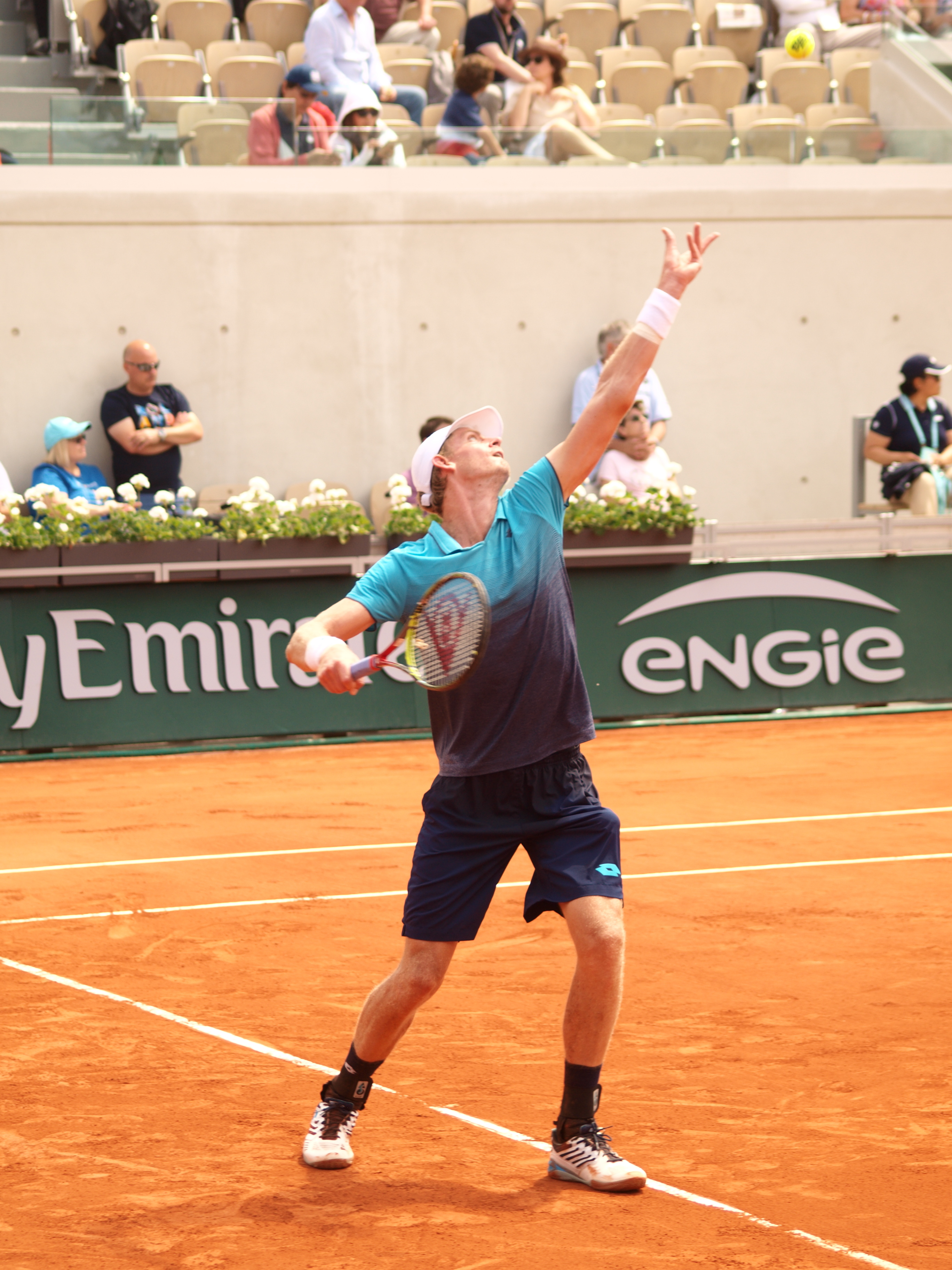
Anderson reached the finals of Wimbledon.

On October 28, after winning the Erste Bank Open, Kevin Anderson qualified for the first time.

Kevin Anderson began the year at the Maharashtra Open where he lost to Frenchman Gilles Simon. His good start was halted at the Australian Open, when he lost to Kyle Edmund in the first round. He then bounced back at the New York Open claiming his fourth career title defeating local favourite Sam Querrey. He reached his third final of the year at the Abierto Mexicano Telcel, but lost to Argentinian Juan Martín del Potro. He then made it to the quarterfinals of both the Indian Wells Masters and Miami Masters losing Borna Ćorić and Pablo Carreño Busta, respectively. He did not start the clay season well, when lost in his first match at the Estoril Open losing to youngster Stefanos Tsitsipas. He claimed some form by reaching the semifinals of the Mutua Madrid Open falling to Dominic Thiem. At the Italian Open, he retired in the second round to Aljaž Bedene due to a leg injury. At the French Open, he suffered a disappointing loss to Argentinian Diego Schwartzman in the fourth round, when he failed to serve it out in the third set and eventual lost the match in five sets.

He began his grass season at the Queen's Club Championships, but lost in the first round to Leonardo Mayer. At the Wimbledon Championships, he reached his second career slam final after marathon wins over Roger Federer in the quarterfinals 13–11 in the fifth and the longest semifinal match in history when he defeated John Isner 26–24 in the fifth set. In the final he faced Novak Djokovic and lost in straight sets. He then competed at the Rogers Cup, where he reached the semifinals, but once again lost to Tsitsipas. At the Western & Southern Open, he lost in the third round to David Goffin. At the US Open, being the defending finalist, he faced Dominic Thiem in the fourth round and lost in straight sets. In the Asian swing, he reached back-to-back quarterfinals at the Japan Open and Shanghai Rolex Masters, losing to Richard Gasquet and Djokovic, respectively. He claimed his second title of the year and his biggest in his career so far at the Erste Bank Open, defeating Kei Nishikori in the final. In the final Masters event of the year, Rolex Paris Masters, he had a rematch against Nishikori in the third round but this time he lost in straight sets.

On November 2, following the quarterfinal results in the Paris Masters, Marin Čilić and Dominic Thiem qualified for the event.

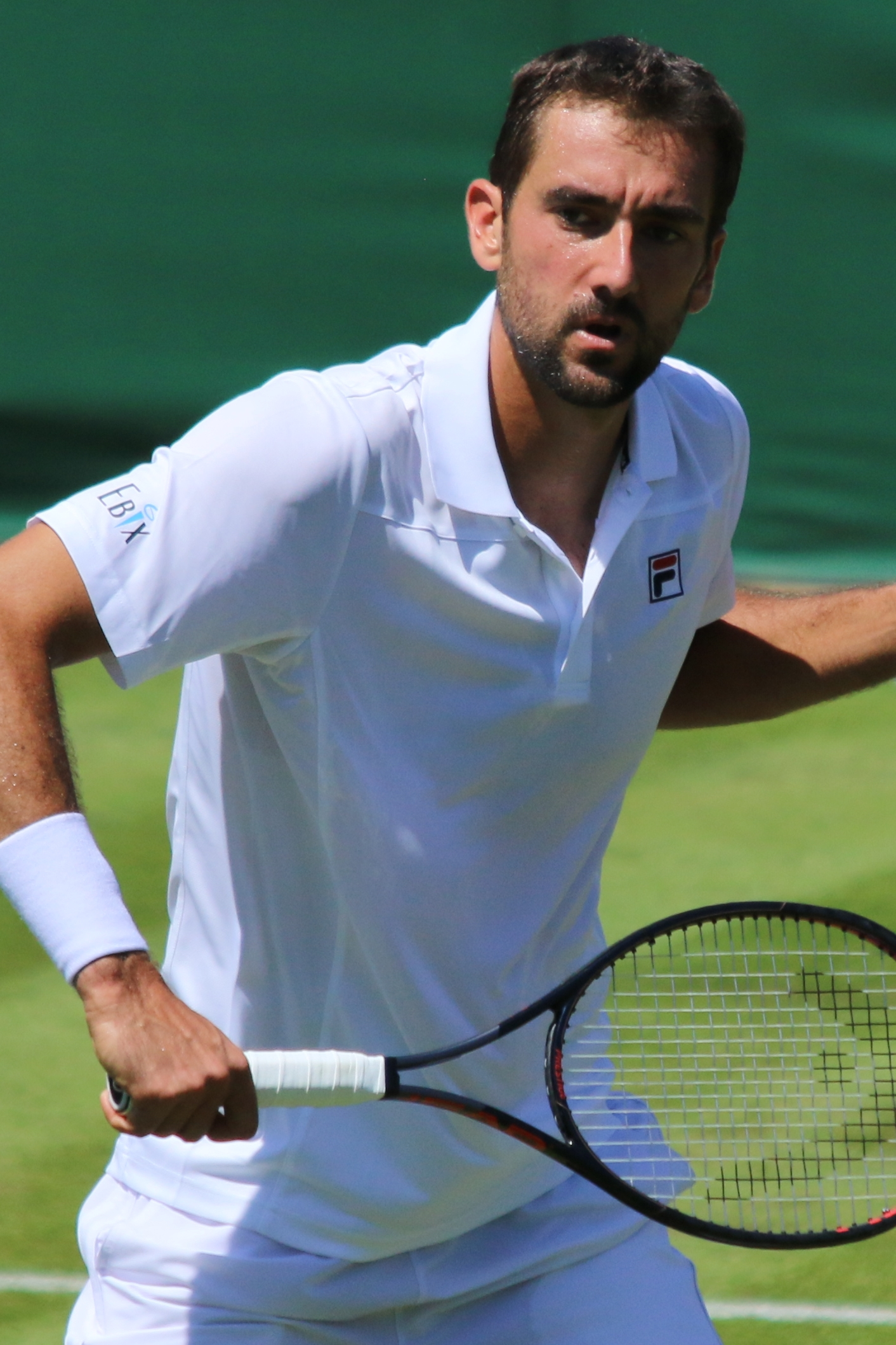
Čilić reached the final of the Australian Open

Marin Čilić began the year at the Maharashtra Open reaching the semifinals before losing to Gilles Simon. At the Australian Open, he defeated Rafael Nadal in the quarterfinals, his first win over Nadal since 2009 and his second win over a current world no. 1. He reached his third slam final, but lost to Roger Federer in five sets, despite this he reached a new career high ranking of number 3 in the world. However, he wasn't able to sustain this form, losing early in his next events in the second round of the Rio Open to Gaël Monfils, third round of Indian Wells Masters to Philipp Kohlschreiber and fourth round of the Miami Masters to John Isner. Čilić then reached the quarterfinals of the Monte-Carlo Masters losing to Kei Nishikori in three sets. Being the top seed at the Istanbul Open, he was upset by Malek Jaziri in the second round. He then competed at the Italian Open reaching the semifinal but fell to Alexander Zverev in two tight sets. At the French Open, Čilić reached the quarterfinals for the second year in a row losing to Argentinian Juan Martín del Potro.

At the grass court season, he started perfectly when he claimed his first title of the year at the Queen's Club Championships defeating Novak Djokovic in the final, where he saved a match point in the second set. At Wimbledon, being the finalist from the year before, he suffered a surprising loss in the second round to Guido Pella despite winning the first two sets. Heading back to the American hardcourts, he did pretty well when he lost to eventual champions Nadal and Djokovic at the quarterfinals of the Rogers Cup and semifinals of the Western & Southern Open, respectively. At the US Open, he had a rematch of the 2014 US Open final against Kei Nishikori, but this time he lost in five sets. Čilić had a terrible Asian swing, losing in the first round of the Japan Open to Jan-Lennard Struff after failing to serve for the match in the third set and the first round of the Shanghai Rolex Masters to Nicolás Jarry after having two match points in the match. His struggle in form continued at the Swiss Indoors when he lost in the second round to Marius Copil in two tight sets despite having set points in the second set. At the Rolex Paris Masters, despite ending Djokovic's 30-set winning streak he fell to the Serbian in three sets in the quarterfinals.

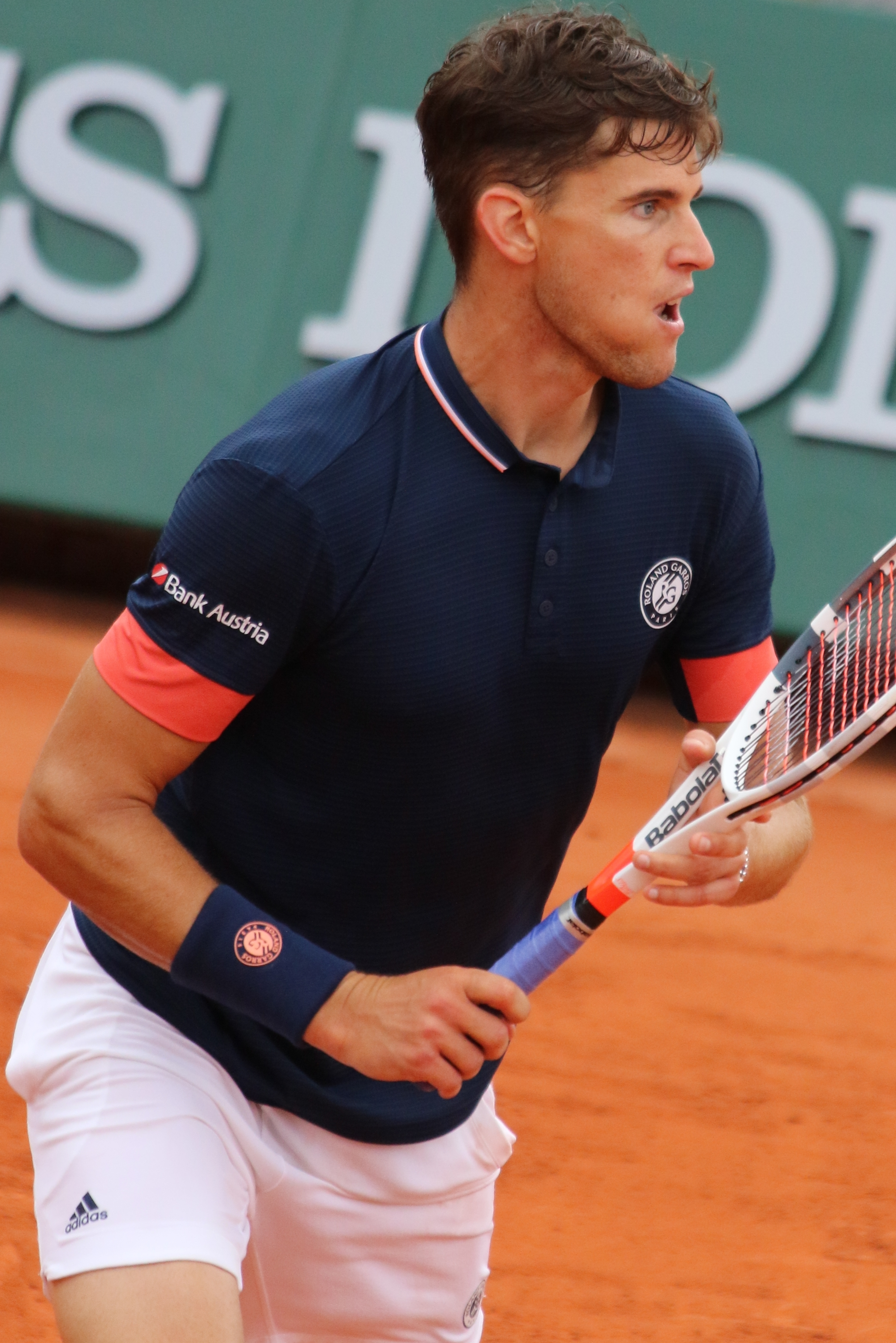
Thiem reached his first slam final at the French Open

Dominic Thiem began the year at the Qatar ExxonMobil Open, where he reached the semifinals but had to withdraw prior to his match against Gaël Monfils due to an illness. At the Australian Open, he once again reached the fourth round but was upset by American Tennys Sandgren in five sets. He then claimed his first title at the Argentina Open defeating Aljaž Bedene in the final and without dropping a set all tournament long. He then competed at the Rio Open and the Abierto Mexicano Telcel but lost to Fernando Verdasco and Juan Martín del Potro respectively. He next competed at the Indian Wells Masters, retiring in the third set against Pablo Cuevas in the third round. At the clay season, he began with back-to-back finals at the Monte Carlo Masters and Barcelona Open losing to Rafael Nadal and Stefanos Tsitsipas, respectively. At the Mutua Madrid Open, he upset Nadal in the quarterfinals and eventually reached the finals for the second year in a row but yet again lost, this time to Alexander Zverev. In the Italian Open, he was upset by Fabio Fognini in the second round. He claimed his second title of the year at the Lyon Open defeating home favorite Gilles Simon in the final. At the French Open, he was able to reach his first slam final and faced Nadal, but lost in straight sets.

At the grass season, Thiem suffered back-to-back loses in the second round of the Gerry Weber Open to Yūichi Sugita and the first round of Wimbledon against Marcos Baghdatis due to a back injury. He then went on a three match losing streak which began with a quarterfinal loss at the German Open to Nicolás Jarry and first round loses at the Generali Open Kitzbühel to Martin Kližan and Rogers Cup to Tsitsipas. At the US Open, Thiem was able to reach the quarterfinals of non-clay slam for the first time but lost to Nadal in a fifth set tiebreak, despite winning the first set in a bagel. He then claimed his third title of the year at the St. Petersburg Open defeating Kližan in the final in two quick sets. At the Shanghai Rolex Masters, he was upset by Matthew Ebden in the second round in a third set tiebreak. At the Erste Bank Open, he reached the quarterfinals losing to Kei Nishikori. At the Rolex Paris Masters, he reached his first semi-final at a Masters tournament on a hard court, but lost to Karen Khachanov.

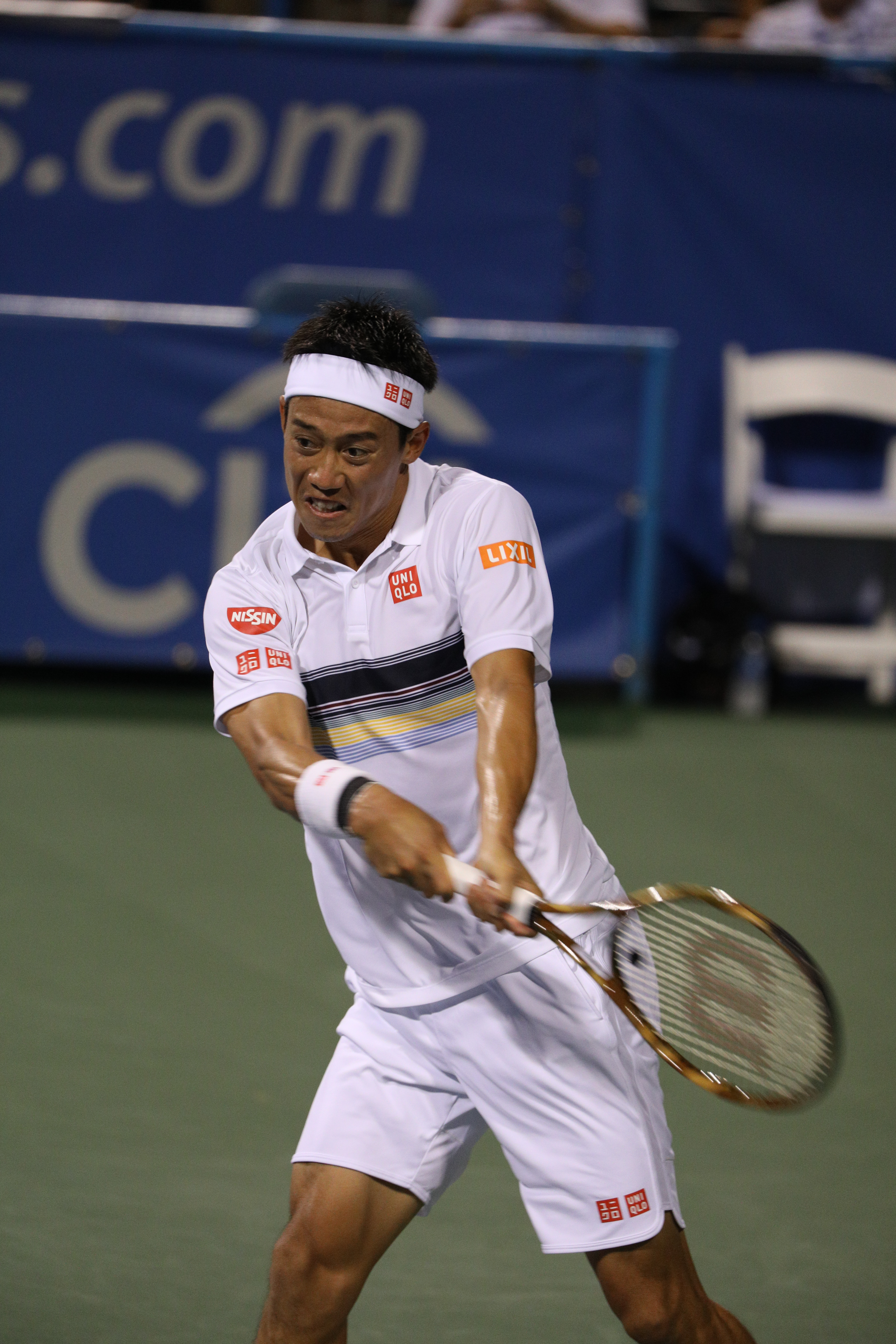
Nishikori reached the semifinals of the US Open

On November 3, following Del Potro's withdrawal from the event, Kei Nishikori was announced as his replacement.

Kei Nishikori returned after a 5-month injury layoff and started his 2018 season by playing at the American challenger tour events. At Oracle Challenger Series he lost in the first round against American qualifier Dennis Novikov. Nishikori went on to win his sixth ATP Challenger career titles at the RBC Tennis Championships, by defeating Mackenzie McDonald in the final. Nishikori made his return to the ATP Tour competition (since August 2017 Montreal) at the inaugural ATP 250 Tournament in New York, where he reached the semifinals before losing to Kevin Anderson. He was unseeded at the Abierto Mexicano Telcel and lost against Denis Shapovalov in the first round. At the Miami Masters, he lost in the third round to Juan Martín del Potro. In the clay season, Nishikori entered the Monte-Carlo Rolex Masters, where he reached his 4th career Masters 1000 finals, before losing to Rafael Nadal in straight sets in the finals. He then suffered back-to-back opening round loses at the Barcelona Open and Mutua Madrid Open to Guillermo García López and Novak Djokovic, respectively. At the Italian Open, he lost to Djokovic in the quarterfinals in three sets. At the French Open, Nishikori was seeded 19th and fell to seventh seed Dominic Thiem in the fourth round.

In the lead up to Wimbledon, Nishikori lost to Karen Khachanov in the 2nd round of the Gerry Weber Open. Entering Wimbledon with an arm injury, but was able to reach quarterfinals of the grass slam for the first time, where he lost to eventual champion Djokovic in four sets. His US Open lead up events, wasn't that successful, he began at the Citi Open but lost to Alexander Zverev in the quarterfinals. He then lost in the first round of the Rogers Cup to Robin Haase and in the second round of the Western & Southern Open to Stan Wawrinka. At the US Open, Nishikori revenges his 2014 US Open final loss when he defeated Marin Čilić in a close five-set victory. He advanced to the semifinals, losing to Djokovic in straight sets. Nishikori was the top seed at the Moselle Open, where he is being upset by qualifier Matthias Bachinger in the semifinals in three sets. He then participated in the Japan Open seeded third and reached the final, he was upset by unseeded Daniil Medvedev. At the Shanghai Rolex Masters, Nishikori reaching the quarterfinals, he was defeated by top seed and defending champion Roger Federer. He then competed at the Erste Bank Open, reaching his third final of the year, he was defeated by second seed Kevin Anderson. At the final Masters event of the year, the Rolex Paris Masters, he was defeated by third seed Federer in the quarterfinals.

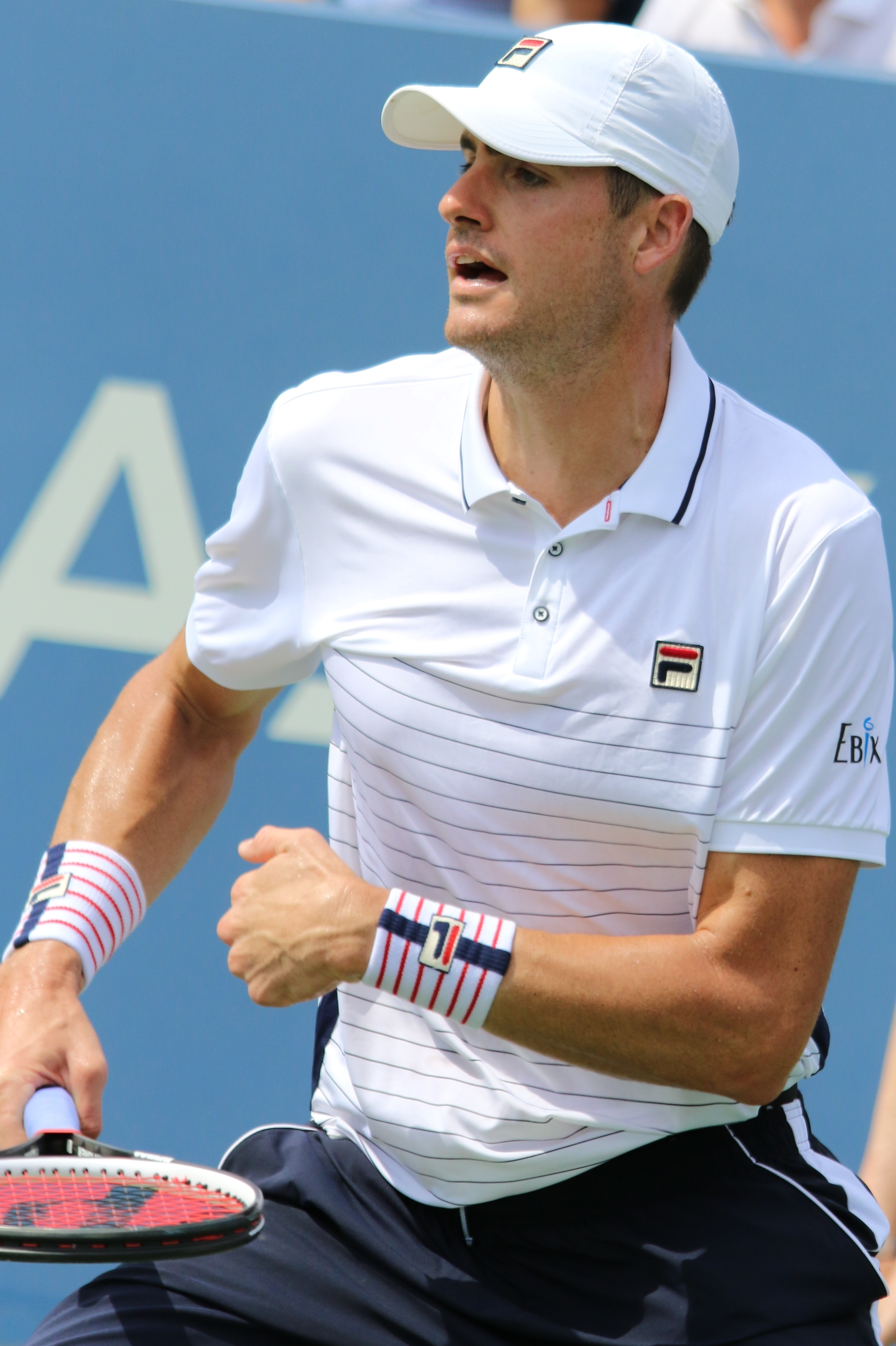
Isner won his first Masters in Miami

On November 5, following Nadal's withdrawal from the event, John Isner became the final qualifier.

John Isner began the year losing in his first match in five of his six tournaments at the ASB Classic to Chung Hyeon, the Australian Open to Matthew Ebden, the New York Open to Radu Albot, the Abierto Mexicano Telcel to Ryan Harrison and the Indian Wells Masters to Gaël Monfils. He only picked up two wins in Davis Cup against Dušan Lajović and Delray Beach Open against Albot before losing to Peter Gojowczyk. However, he rebounded at the Miami Masters, when claimed his first Masters title defeating Alexander Zverev in the final. He began his clay season with quarterfinal showings at the U.S. Men's Clay Court Championships losing to compatriot Steve Johnson and the Mutua Madrid Open losing to Zverev. At the Italian Open, he was upset by Albert Ramos Viñolas in the second round. He then competed at the Lyon Open in a losing effort to Cameron Norrie in the quarterfinals. He then match his best result at the French Open, by reaching the fourth round falling to Juan Martín del Potro.

At the Wimbledon Championships, he reached his first slam semifinal and faced Kevin Anderson where he recorded the second longest match while also holding the longest match against Mahut. However, this time Isner came out in the losing end, losing the final set 26–24. He then claimed his second title of the year at the BB&T Atlanta Open defeating American Harrison in the final. However, he didn't do well in his next events losing to Noah Rubin in the second round of Citi Open, to Karen Khachanov in the third round of Rogers Cup and to Sam Querrey in the first round of the Western & Southern Open. He rebounded at the US Open by reaching his second quarterfinals at the event but fell to del Potro in four sets. He then skipped the Asian swing due to the birth of his daughter. He came back at the Stockholm Open losing in the semifinal to Ernests Gulbis. He then lost in last 16 of the Erste Bank Open to Monfils and the Paris Rolex Masters to Khachanov.

=== Doubles ===
| # | Players | Points | Tours | Date Qualified |
|---|---|---|---|---|
| 1 | (Austria) Oliver Marach (Croatia) Mate Pavić | 7,430 | 22 | 27 July |
| 2 | (Colombia) Juan Sebastián Cabal (Colombia) Robert Farah | 5,830 | 20 | 29 September |
| 3 | (Poland) Łukasz Kubot (Brazil) Marcelo Melo | 5,250 | 23 | 13 October |
| 4 | (United Kingdom) Jamie Murray (Brazil) Bruno Soares | 4,940 | 20 | 11 October |
| — | (United States) Bob Bryan (United States) Mike Bryan | 4,355 | 9 | 2 August |
| 5 | (United States) Mike Bryan (United States) Jack Sock | 4,270 | 6 | 14 October |
| 6 | (South Africa) Raven Klaasen (New Zealand) Michael Venus | 4,165 | 23 | 23 October |
| 7 | (Croatia) Nikola Mektić (Austria) Alexander Peya | 3,920 | 21 | 23 October |
| 8 | (France) Pierre-Hugues Herbert (France) Nicolas Mahut | 3,310 | 10 | 14 October |

On July 27, the team of Oliver Marach and Mate Pavić became the first qualifiers.

Oliver Marach & Mate Pavić began the year with a 17 match winning streak, winning their first three tournaments at the Qatar ExxonMobil Open against Murray/Soares, the ASB Classic against Mirnyi/Oswald and their first men's slam title at the Australian Open defeating Cabal/Farah. Their streak ended when they lost in the final of the Rotterdam Open losing to Herbert/Mahut. Their clay season was quite successful reaching the final of the Monte-Carlo Masters when they lost to American brothers M Bryan/B Bryan and winning the title at the Geneva Open defeating Dodig/Ram. They then reached their second slam final in a row, when they reached the final of the French Open losing to the French duo of Herbert/Mahut. Their next final came at the German Open but lost once again this time to the South American pairing of Peralta/Zeballos. At the Asian swing they fell in the final of the China Open to Kubot/Melo. In the rest of their slam results after their reaching the finals of the first two slams was disappointing as they fell in the first rounds of the Wimbledon Championships to Delbonis/Reyes-Varela and the US Open to Mayer/Sousa. won the Chengdu Open with Ivan Dodig defeating Krajicek/Nedunchezhiyan

On August 2, Bob Bryan ended his season due to a hip injury, thus unable to qualify with brother Mike Bryan.

Bob Bryan & Mike Bryan began the year with a semifinal showing at the Australian Open where they lost to Cabal/Farah. They then reach three finals in a row back in the Americas, losing in the final of the Abierto Mexicano Telcel to Murray/Soares, losing in the final of the BNP Paribas Open losing to compatriots Isner/Sock. Their third final came at the Miami Open, this time they won defeating Russians Khachanov/Rublev in the final. At the clay season they won the title at the Monte Carlo Masters defeating Marach/Pavić. They then faced Mektić/Peya at the final of the Mutua Madrid Open but retired in the first set down a break due to Bob's hip injury, which ended his season.

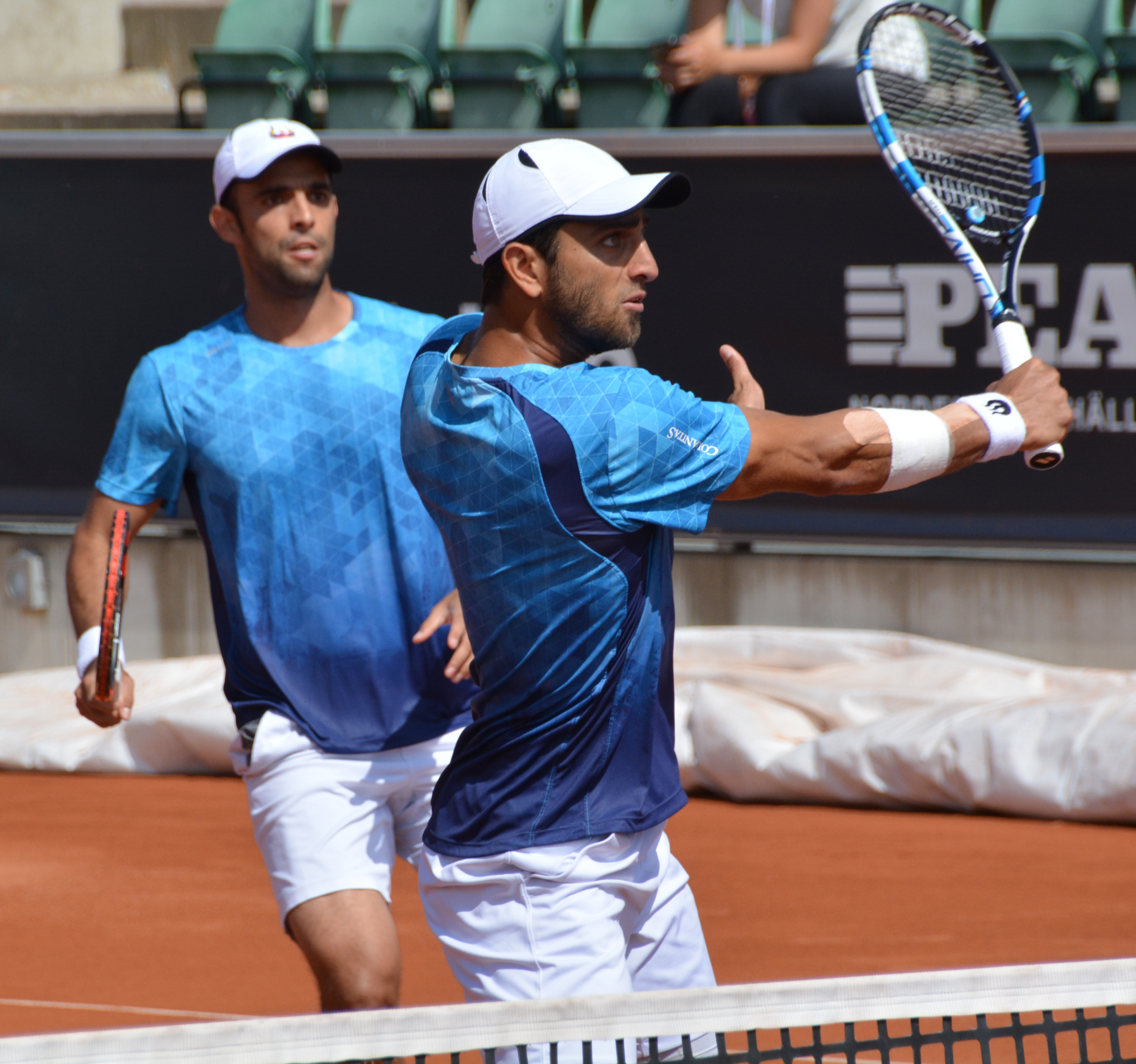
Cabal & Farah qualifies for the first time

On September 29, the Colombian pairing of Juan Sebastián Cabal and Robert Farah became the second qualifiers

Juan Sebastián Cabal & Robert Farah had a solid 2018 when they reached their first slam final as a team at the Australian Open before losing to the team of Marach/Pavić. They followed it up with another final this time at the clay courts of the Argentina Open falling to the local team of Molteni/Zeballos. Their European clay season was quite successful highlighted by their title at the Italian Open defeating Carreño Busta/Sousa. They followed it up by reaching the quarterfinals of the French Open but once again lost to Marach/Pavić. At Wimbledon they reached the third round and was upset by Nielsen/Salisbury. They then reached their fourth final of the year at the Western & Southern Open but lost to Murray/Soares in a match tiebreak. At the US Open, they were able to reach the semifinals losing to eventual champions Bryan/Sock.

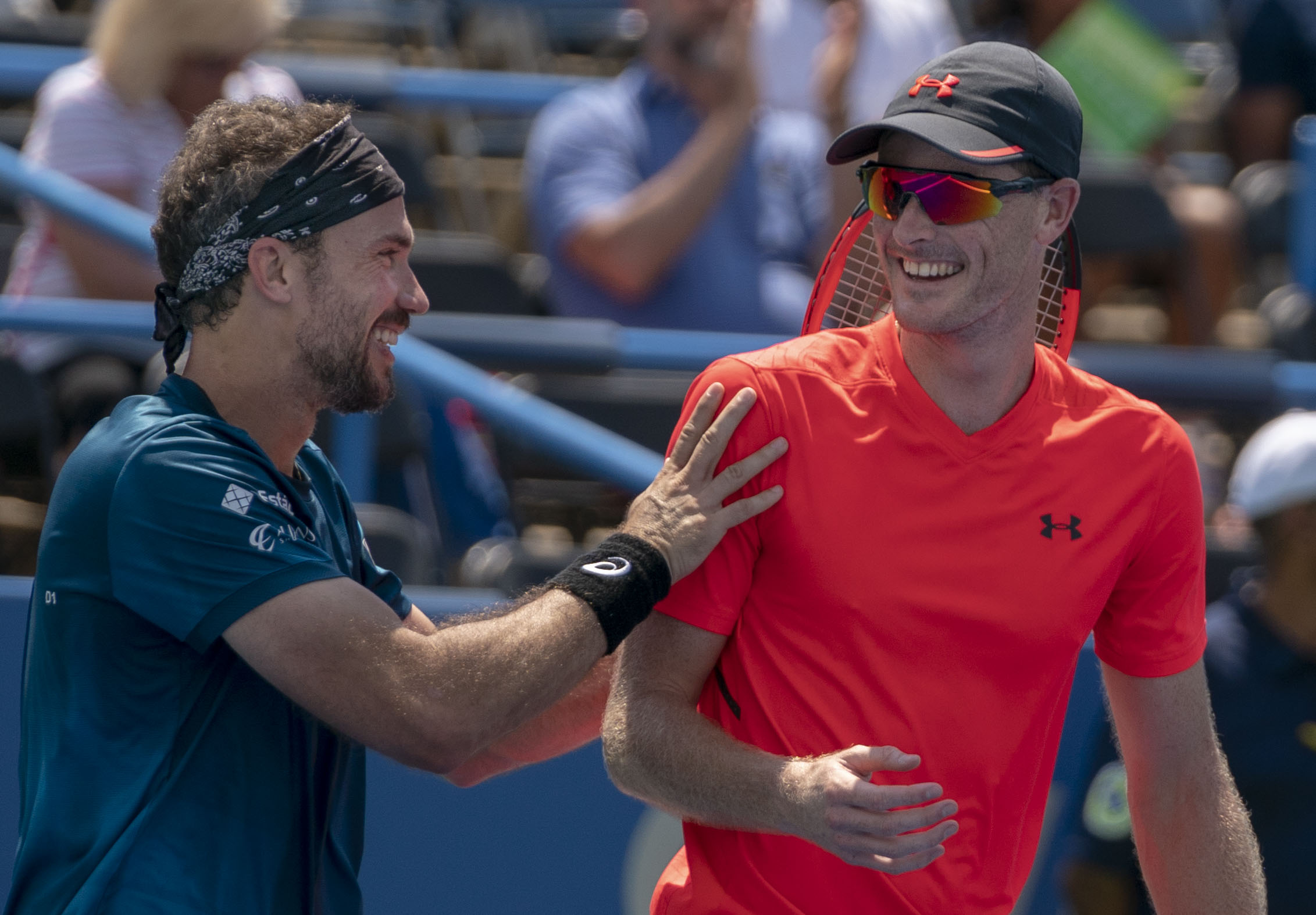
Soares and Murray won Cincinnati

On October 11, Jamie Murray and Bruno Soares qualified for the event.

Jamie Murray & Bruno Soares began the year by reaching the final of the Qatar ExxonMobil Open but lost to Marach/Pavić. They were unable to capitalize on this as they fell in the second round of the Australian Open to the Indian pairing of Paes/Raja. They won their first title of the year at the Abierto Mexicano Telcel defeating M Bryan/B Bryan in the final. They failed to win back-to-back matches except for a semifinal at the Italian Open in their next events after the title prior to the grass season including a second round loss at the French Open to González/Jarry. They bounced back at the grass courts of the Queen's Club Championships by reaching the final but lost to Kontinen/Peers. At Wimbledon, they reached the quarterfinal before losing to eventual runner-ups Klaasen/Venus. They claimed their second title at the Citi Open when they defeated M Bryan/Roger-Vasselin. They followed it up by claiming their biggest title of the year at the Western & Southern Open a few weeks later, defeating Cabal/Farah in the final. At the US Open, they fell in the quarterfinals losing to Albot/Jaziri. At the Shanghai Rolex Masters, they reached their second Masters final but lost to Kubot/Melo in straight sets.

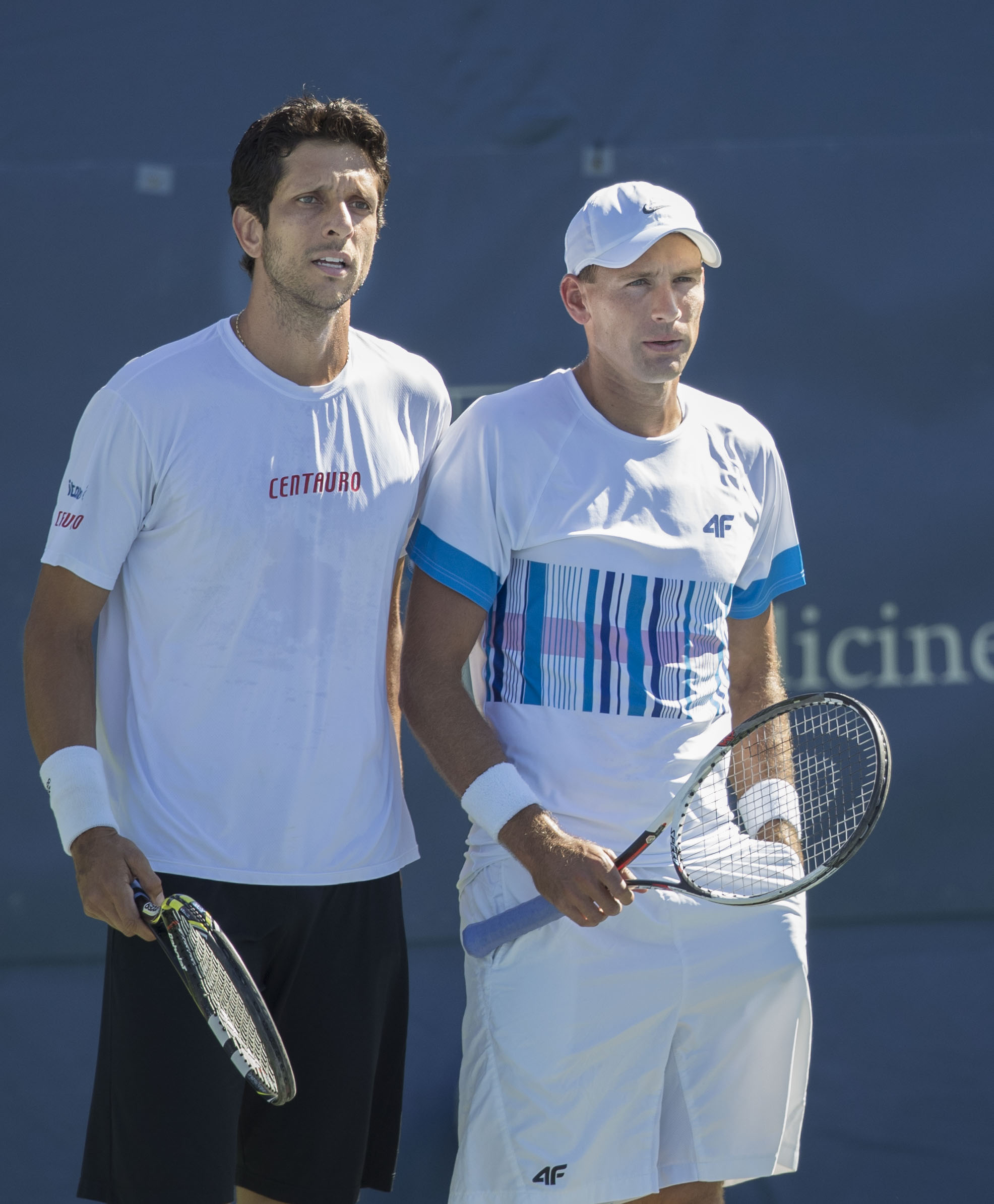
Kubot and Melo qualifies

On October 13, defending finalists Łukasz Kubot and Marcelo Melo took one of the spots in the event.

Łukasz Kubot & Marcelo Melo began the year as the world no. 1's and started perfectly when they won Sydney International defeating Struff/Troicki in the final. At the Australian Open, they reached the quarterfinals and was upset by McLachlan/Struff narrowly losing the third set tie-break. After this, they struggled to get decent results including a third round exit at the French Open losing to Bopanna/Roger-Vasselin. They were able to break the drought at the Gerry Weber Open defeating German brothers A Zverev/M Zverev. However, being the defending champion at Wimbledon, they lost in the second round in four tight sets to Erlich/Matkowski. This followed by a string of bad results, only winning a match at the Western & Southern Open. However, despite this bad results, they rebounded by reaching the final of the US Open, losing to M Bryan/Sock in two quick sets. This results gave them confidence as they claimed back-to-back titles at the China Open and Shanghai Rolex Masters, defeating Marach/Pavić and Murray/Soares, respectively.

On October 14, slams champions teams of Americans Mike Bryan and Jack Sock, and Frenchmen Pierre-Hugues Herbert and Nicolas Mahut gained the next two spots.

Mike Bryan & Jack Sock began their team-up at the Queen's Club Championships following Bob Bryan's injury woes, where they fell in the quarterfinals to Kontinen/Peers. They didn't play a lot of tournaments a team but claimed the most important ones at the Wimbledon Championships defeating Klaasen/Venus and the US Open defeating Kubot/Melo. This made them the only team to win two slams in the year.

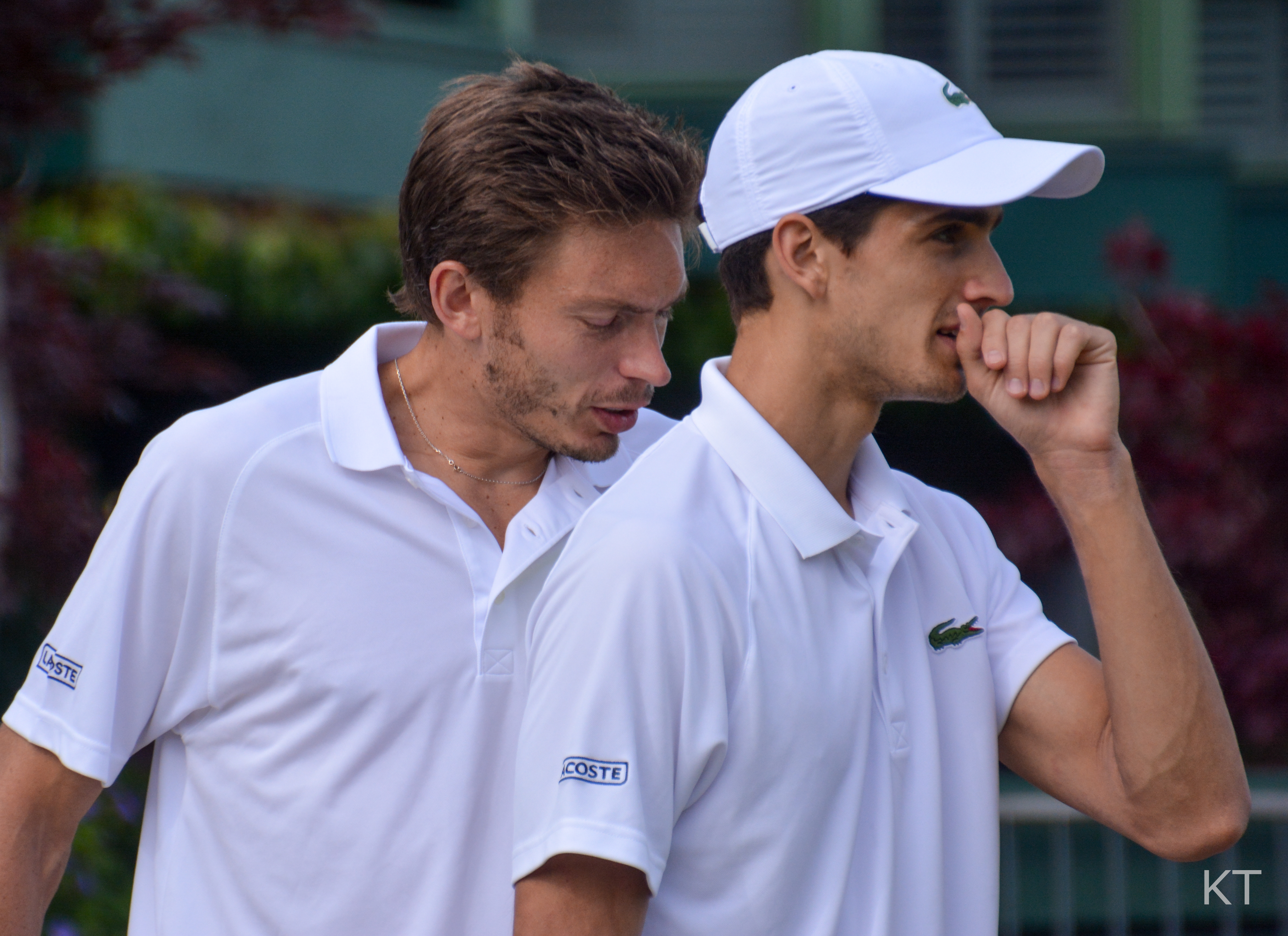
Herbert and Mahut won the French Open

Pierre-Hugues Herbert & Nicolas Mahut began the year with a second round loss at the Australian Open to Podlipnik Castillo/Vasilevski in third set tie-break. They won their first title of the year at the Rotterdam Open defeating Marach/Pavić in the final. They didn't play much together until the French Open, where they reached the final, meaning they have reached the final of each slam, where they faced Marach/Pavić and won. This is their 3rd slam title as a team and has won three of the four slam titles as a team. However, they suffered an upset loss at Wimbledon to Germans Petzschner/Puetz. At the US Open, they drew Kubot/Melo early in the third round and lost to the eventual runner-ups.

On October 23, the last two spots were occupied by the teams of Raven Klaasen & Michael Venus and Nikola Mektić & Alexander Peya

Raven Klaasen & Michael Venus result at the first slam of the year at the Australian Open was a disappointing first round exit to Lipsky/Marrero. They won their first title of the year at the Open 13, where they defeated Daniell/Inglot. Their next events were not so successful including a third round exit at the French Open to Mektić/Peya. They then reached the finals of the Rosmalen Grass Court Championships but lost to Inglot/Škugor in the final. They then reached their first slam final as a team at the Wimbledon Championships but lost to the newly formed American team of Bryan/Sock. They reached their fourth final of the year at the Rogers Cup where they lost to Kontinen/Peers. At the US Open, they were upset by Gonzalez/Jarry in the second. At the Rakuten Japan Open Tennis Championships, they lost yet another final this time to the team of McLachlan/Struff.

Nikola Mektić & Alexander Peya did won a match until the Australian Open where they fell in the second round to eventual runner-ups Cabal/Farah. They reached their first final as a team at the Diema Xtra Sofia Open but lost to the Dutch team of Haase/Middelkoop. They then reached another final at the Rio Open but lost yet again to the Spanish duo of Marrero/Verdasco. They claimed their first title as a team at the Grand Prix Hassan II defeating the French pairing of Paire/Roger-Vasselin in the final. They followed it up with their fourth final at the BMW Open but lost yet again this time to Dodig/Ram. They won their biggest title of the year at the Mutua Madrid Open against Bryan/Bryan when Bob Bryan retired due to injury in the first set. They continued their clay success at the French Open, where they reached the semifinals losing to eventual champions Herbert/Mahut. They then lost in the third round of the Wimbledon Championships to Haase/Lindstedt. They then didn't play together from the US Open onwards due to Peya's elbow injury which forced them to withdraw from the quarterfinals of the Western & Southern Open.

== Points breakdown ==
=== Singles ===
- Players in gold (*) have qualified for the ATP Finals.
- Players in brown (!) have withdrawn due to injury.

| Seed | Player | Grand Slam | | | | ATP World Tour Masters 1000 | | | | | | | | Best Other | | | | | | Total points | Tourn |
|---|---|---|---|---|---|---|---|---|---|---|---|---|---|---|---|---|---|---|---|---|---|
| Seed | Player | AUS | FRA | WIM | USO | IW | MI | MA | IT | CA | CI | SH | PA | 1 | 2 | 3 | 4 | 5 | 6 | Total points | Tourn |
| 1* | (Serbia) Novak Djokovic | R16; 180 | QF; 360 | W 2000 | W 2000 | R64; 10 | R64; 10 | R32; 45 | SF; 360 | R16; 90 | W 1000 | W 1000 | F 600 | F 300 | R16; 90 | R32; 0 | | | | 8,045 | 15 |
| —! | (Spain) Rafael Nadal | QF; 360 | W 2000 | SF; 720 | SF; 720 | A 0 | A 0 | QF; 180 | W 1000 | W 1000 | A 0 | A 0 | A 0 | W 1000 | W 500 | | | | | 7,480 | 9 |
| 2* | (Switzerland) Roger Federer | W 2000 | A 0 | QF; 360 | R16; 180 | F 600 | R64; 10 | A 0 | A 0 | A 0 | F 600 | SF; 360 | SF; 360 | W 500 | W 500 | F 300 | W 250 | | | 6,020 | 12 |
| —! | (Argentina) Juan Martín del Potro | R32; 90 | SF; 720 | QF; 360 | F 1200 | W 1000 | SF; 360 | R16; 90 | R16; 90 | A 0 | QF; 180 | R16; 90 | R16; 20 | W 500 | F 300 | F 150 | F 150 | A 0^{†} | A 0^{†} | 5,300 | 15 |
| 3* | (Germany) Alexander Zverev | R32; 90 | QF; 360 | R32; 90 | R32; 90 | R64; 10 | F 600 | W 1000 | F 600 | QF; 180 | R32; 10 | SF; 360 | QF; 180 | W 500 | SF; 360 | W 250 | SF; 180 | SF; 180 | R16; 45 | 5,085 | 20 |
| 4* | (South Africa) Kevin Anderson | R128; 10 | R16; 180 | F 1200 | R16; 180 | QF; 180 | QF; 180 | SF; 360 | R32; 10 | SF; 360 | R16; 90 | QF; 180 | R16; 90 | W 500 | F 300 | W 250 | F 150 | QF; 90 | R16; 0 | 4,310 | 21 |
| 5* | (Croatia) Marin Čilić | F 1200 | QF; 360 | R64; 45 | QF; 360 | R32; 45 | R16; 90 | A 0 | SF; 360 | QF; 180 | SF; 360 | R32; 10 | QF; 180 | W 500 | QF; 180 | SF; 90 | R16; 45 | R16; 45 | R16; 0 | 4,050 | 18 |
| 6* | (Austria) Dominic Thiem | R16; 180 | F 1200 | R128; 10 | QF; 360 | R32; 45 | A 0 | F 600 | R32; 10 | R32; 10 | A 0 | R32; 10 | SF; 360 | W 250 | W 250 | W 250 | QF; 180 | QF; 90 | QF; 90 | 3,895 | 23 |
| 7* | (Japan) Kei Nishikori | A 0 | R16; 180 | QF; 360 | SF; 720 | A 0 | R32; 45 | R64; 10 | QF; 180 | R64; 10 | R32; 45 | QF; 180 | QF; 180 | F 600 | F 300 | F 300 | W 100 | QF; 90 | SF; 90 | 3,390 | 21 |
| 8* | (United States) John Isner | R128; 10 | R16; 180 | SF; 720 | QF; 360 | R64; 10 | W 1000 | QF; 180 | R32; 10 | R16; 90 | R64; 10 | R16; 20 | R16; 90 | W 250 | SF; 90 | R16; 45 | QF; 45 | QF; 45 | A 0^{†} | 3,155 | 22 |
Alternates
| 9 | (Russia) Karen Khachanov | R64; 45 | R16; 180 | R16; 180 | R32; 90 | R128; 10 | R32; 45 | R64; 10 | R64; 10 | SF; 360 | R16; 90 | R32; 45 | W 1000 | W 250 | W 250 | R16; 90 | QF; 90 | R16; 45 | R16; 45 | 2,835 | 25 |
| 10 | (Croatia) Borna Ćorić | R128; 10 | R32; 90 | R128; 10 | R16; 180 | SF; 360 | QF; 180 | R16; 90 | R64; 10 | R32; 45 | R32; 45 | F 600 | R16; 90 | W 500 | QF; 90 | QF; 90 | R32; 45 | QF; 45 | R16; 0 | 2,480 | 20 |

- Ranking points in italics indicate that a player did not qualify for (or used an exemption to skip) a Grand Slam or Masters 1000 event and substituted his next best result in its place.

† Mandatory zero-point penalty for Top 30 commitment player who did not play four ATP World Tour 500 series events during the year, or at least one such event after the US Open.

=== Doubles ===
- Teams in gold (*) have qualified for the ATP Finals.
- Teams in dark brown have one player that qualified separately with another partner, making the team ineligible to qualify.

| Rank | Player | Points | | | | | | | | | | | | | | | | | | Total points | Tourn |
| Rank | Player | 1 | 2 | 3 | 4 | 5 | 6 | 7 | 8 | 9 | 10 | 11 | 12 | 13 | 14 | 15 | 16 | 17 | 18 | Total points | Tourn |
|---|---|---|---|---|---|---|---|---|---|---|---|---|---|---|---|---|---|---|---|---|---|
| 1* | (Austria) Oliver Marach (Croatia) Mate Pavić | W 2000 | F 1200 | F 600 | SF; 360 | SF; 360 | SF; 360 | SF; 360 | F 300 | F 300 | F 300 | W 250 | W 250 | W 250 | QF; 180 | QF; 180 | SF; 180 | SF; 180 | QF; 90 | 7,700 | 23 |
| 2* | (Colombia) Juan Sebastián Cabal (Colombia) Robert Farah | F 1200 | W 1000 | SF; 720 | F 600 | QF; 360 | SF; 360 | SF; 360 | R16; 180 | QF; 180 | QF; 180 | SF; 180 | SF; 180 | F 150 | QF; 90 | QF; 45 | QF; 45 | R16; 0 | R32; 0 | 5,830 | 21 |
| 3* | (Poland) Łukasz Kubot (Brazil) Marcelo Melo | F 1200 | W 1000 | W 500 | W 500 | QF; 360 | W 250 | R16; 180 | QF; 180 | QF; 180 | QF; 180 | QF; 180 | SF; 180 | R32; 90 | QF; 90 | QF; 90 | QF; 90 | SF; 90 | SF; 90 | 5,430 | 24 |
| 4* | (United Kingdom) Jamie Murray (Brazil) Bruno Soares | W 1000 | F 600 | W 500 | W 500 | QF; 360 | QF; 360 | SF; 360 | F 300 | QF; 180 | SF; 180 | F 150 | R32; 90 | R32; 90 | R16; 90 | R16; 90 | QF; 90 | R16; 0 | R16; 0 | 4,940 | 21 |
| 5* | (United States) Mike Bryan (United States) Jack Sock | W 2000 | W 2000 | SF; 360 | QF; 180 | QF; 180 | QF; 90 | R16; 0 | | | | | | | | | | | | 4,810 | 7 |
| — | (United States) Bob Bryan (United States) Mike Bryan | W 1000 | W 1000 | SF; 720 | F 600 | F 600 | F 300 | SF; 90 | QF; 45 | R16; 0 | | | | | | | | | | 4,355 | 9 |
| 6* | (South Africa) Raven Klaasen (New Zealand) Michael Venus | F 1200 | F 600 | F 300 | W 250 | R16; 180 | QF; 180 | QF; 180 | QF; 180 | QF; 180 | QF; 180 | SF; 180 | F 150 | R32; 90 | R16; 90 | R16; 90 | R16; 90 | QF; 90 | SF; 90 | 4,300 | 24 |
| 7* | (Croatia) Nikola Mektić (Austria) Alexander Peya | W 1000 | SF; 720 | SF; 360 | F 300 | W 250 | R16; 180 | QF; 180 | QF; 180 | SF; 180 | SF; 180 | F 150 | F 150 | R32; 90 | R16; 0 | R16; 0 | R32; 0 | R16; 0 | R32; 0 | 3,920 | 21 |
| 8* | (France) Pierre-Hugues Herbert (France) Nicolas Mahut | W 2000 | W 500 | SF; 360 | R16; 180 | QF; 180 | R32; 90 | R32; 90 | R16; 90 | R16; 0 | R16; 0 | R16; 0 | | | | | | | | 3,490 | 11 |
Alternates
| 9 | (Finland) Henri Kontinen (Australia) John Peers | W 1000 | W 500 | QF; 360 | W 250 | QF; 180 | QF; 180 | R32; 90 | R32; 90 | R16; 90 | R16; 0 | R16; 0 | R16; 0 | R16; 0 | R16; 0 | R64; 0 | R16; 0 | R16; 0 | R16; 0 | 2,740 | 20 |
| 10 | (Netherlands) Jean-Julien Rojer (Romania) Horia Tecău | F 600 | W 500 | SF; 360 | W 250 | QF; 180 | SF; 180 | R32; 90 | R32; 90 | R16; 90 | R16; 90 | R16; 90 | QF; 90 | SF; 90 | R16; 0 | R16; 0 | | | | 2,700 | 15 |

== Head-to-head ==
Below are the head-to-head records as they approached the tournament.

=== Singles ===
Overall

| | | Djokovic | Federer | Zverev | Anderson | Čilić | Thiem | Nishikori | Isner | Overall | YTD W–L |
| 1 | (Serbia) Novak Djokovic | | 25–22 | 1–1 | 7–1 | 16–2 | 5–2 | 15–2 | 8–2 | 77–32 | 49–11 |
| 2 | (Switzerland) Roger Federer | 22–25 | | 3–2 | 4–1 | 9–1 | 1–2 | 7–2 | 5–2 | 51–35 | 46–8 |
| 3 | (Germany) Alexander Zverev | 1–1 | 2–3 | | 4–0 | 5–1 | 2–5 | 2–1 | 4–1 | 20–12 | 54–18 |
| 4 | (South Africa) Kevin Anderson | 1–7 | 1–4 | 0–4 | | 1–6 | 6–2 | 3–5 | 4–8 | 16–36 | 45–17 |
| 5 | (Croatia) Marin Čilić | 2–16 | 1–9 | 1–5 | 6–1 | | 0–1 | 6–9 | 7–3 | 23–44 | 41–18 |
| 6 | (Austria) Dominic Thiem | 2–5 | 2–1 | 5–2 | 2–6 | 1–0 | | 1–3 | 1–1 | 14–18 | 53–18 |
| 7 | (Japan) Kei Nishikori | 2–15 | 2–7 | 1–2 | 5–3 | 9–6 | 3–1 | | 2–1 | 24–35 | 42–19 |
| 8 | (United States) John Isner | 2–8 | 2–5 | 1–4 | 8–4 | 3–7 | 1–1 | 1–2 | | 18–31 | 34–19 |

Indoor hardcourt

| | | Djokovic | Federer | Zverev | Anderson | Čilić | Thiem | Nishikori | Isner | Overall | YTD W–L |
| 1 | (Serbia) Novak Djokovic | | 6–4 | 0–0 | 0–0 | 3–1 | 1–0 | 4–1 | 2–0 | 16–6 | 4–1 |
| 2 | (Switzerland) Roger Federer | 4–6 | | 1–0 | 1–0 | 2–0 | 0–0 | 4–0 | 0–1 | 12–7 | 12–1 |
| 3 | (Germany) Alexander Zverev | 0–0 | 0–1 | | 0–0 | 2–0 | 0–1 | 0–0 | 0–0 | 2–2 | 6–3 |
| 4 | (South Africa) Kevin Anderson | 0–0 | 0–1 | 0–0 | | 0–0 | 1–0 | 2–2 | 0–0 | 3–3 | 11–2 |
| 5 | (Croatia) Marin Čilić | 1–3 | 0–2 | 0–2 | 0–0 | | 0–0 | 2–1 | 0–1 | 3–9 | 3–3 |
| 6 | (Austria) Dominic Thiem | 0–1 | 0–0 | 1–0 | 0–1 | 0–0 | | 0–1 | 0–0 | 1–3 | 7–2 |
| 7 | (Japan) Kei Nishikori | 1–4 | 0–4 | 0–0 | 2–2 | 1–2 | 1–0 | | 0–0 | 5–12 | 15–5 |
| 8 | (United States) John Isner | 0–2 | 1–0 | 0–0 | 0–0 | 1–0 | 0–0 | 0–0 | | 2–2 | 5–4 |

=== Doubles ===
| | | Marach; Pavić | Cabal; Farah | Kubot; Melo | Murray; Soares | Bryan; Sock | Klaasen; Venus | Mektić; Peya | Herbert; Mahut | Overall | YTD W–L |
| 1 | (Austria) Oliver Marach (Croatia) Mate Pavić | | 2–0 | 0–3 | 1–2 | 0–0 | 0–1 | 0–2 | 0–3 | 3–11 | 51–17 |
| 2 | (Colombia) Juan Sebastián Cabal (Colombia) Robert Farah | 0–2 | | 4–2 | 2–4 | 0–1 | 0–2 | 1–2 | 1–3 | 8–16 | 37–21 |
| 3 | (Poland) Łukasz Kubot (Brazil) Marcelo Melo | 3–0 | 2–4 | | 4–3 | 0–1 | 3–1 | 0–1 | 1–0 | 13–10 | 39–20 |
| 4 | (United Kingdom) Jamie Murray (Brazil) Bruno Soares | 2–1 | 4–2 | 3–4 | | 0–0 | 2–1 | 1–1 | 2–2 | 14–11 | 37–18 |
| 5 | (United States) Mike Bryan (United States) Jack Sock | 0–0 | 1–0 | 1–0 | 0–0 | | 1–1 | 0–0 | 1–0 | 4–1 | 16–5 |
| 6 | (South Africa) Raven Klaasen (New Zealand) Michael Venus | 1–0 | 2–0 | 1–3 | 1–2 | 1–1 | | 0–2 | 0–0 | 6–8 | 38–23 |
| 7 | (Croatia) Nikola Mektić (Austria) Alexander Peya | 2–0 | 2–1 | 1–0 | 1–1 | 0–0 | 2–0 | | 0–1 | 8–3 | 36–18 |
| 8 | (France) Pierre-Hugues Herbert (France) Nicolas Mahut | 3–0 | 3–1 | 0–1 | 2–2 | 0–1 | 0–0 | 1–0 | | 9–5 | 20–9 |

== Day-by-day summaries ==
=== Singles groups ===
| Group Guga Kuerten | Group Lleyton Hewitt |
|---|---|
| (Serbia) Novak Djokovic [1] | (Switzerland) Roger Federer [2] |
| (Germany) Alexander Zverev [3] | (South Africa) Kevin Anderson [4] |
| (Croatia) Marin Čilić [5] | (Austria) Dominic Thiem [6] |
| (United States) John Isner [8] | (Japan) Kei Nishikori [7] |

=== Doubles groups ===
| Group Knowles/Nestor | Group Llodra/Santoro |
|---|---|
| (Austria) Oliver Marach / (Croatia) Mate Pavić [1] | (Colombia) Juan Sebastián Cabal / (Colombia) Robert Farah [2] |
| (Poland) Łukasz Kubot / (Brazil) Marcelo Melo [3] | (United Kingdom) Jamie Murray / (Brazil) Bruno Soares [4] |
| (United States) Mike Bryan / (United States) Jack Sock [5] | (South Africa) Raven Klaasen / (New Zealand) Michael Venus [6] |
| (France) Pierre-Hugues Herbert / (France) Nicolas Mahut [7] | (Croatia) Nikola Mektić / (Austria) Alexander Peya [8] |
| | (Finland) Henri Kontinen / (Australia) John Peers [9/ALT] |

| Session | Group / round | Winner | Loser | Score |
Day 1 (11 November)
| Afternoon | Doubles Group Llodra/Santoro | (United Kingdom) Jamie Murray (Brazil) Bruno Soares [4] | (South Africa) Raven Klaasen (New Zealand) Michael Venus [6] | 7–6^{(7–5)}, 4–6, [10–5] |
| Afternoon | Singles Group Lleyton Hewitt | (South Africa) Kevin Anderson [4] | (Austria) Dominic Thiem [6] | 6–3, 7–6^{(12–10)} |
| Evening | Doubles Group Llodra/Santoro | (Colombia) Juan Sebastián Cabal (Colombia) Robert Farah [2] | (Croatia) Nikola Mektić (Austria) Alexander Peya [7] | 6–3, 6–4 |
| Evening | Singles Group Lleyton Hewitt | (Japan) Kei Nishikori [7] | (Switzerland) Roger Federer [2] | 7–6^{(7–4)}, 6–3 |
Day 2 (12 November)
| Afternoon | Doubles Group Knowles/Nestor | (Austria) Oliver Marach (Croatia) Mate Pavić [1] | (France) Pierre-Hugues Herbert (France) Nicolas Mahut [8] | 6–4, 7–6^{(7–3)} |
| Afternoon | Singles Group Guga Kuerten | (Germany) Alexander Zverev [3] | (Croatia) Marin Čilić [5] | 7–6^{(7–5)}, 7–6^{(7–1)} |
| Evening | Doubles Group Knowles/Nestor | (United States) Mike Bryan (United States) Jack Sock [5] | (Poland) Łukasz Kubot (Brazil) Marcelo Melo [3] | 6–3, 7–6^{(7–5)} |
| Evening | Singles Group Guga Kuerten | (Serbia) Novak Djokovic [1] | (United States) John Isner [8] | 6–4, 6–3 |
Day 3 (13 November)
| Afternoon | Doubles Group Llodra/Santoro | (South Africa) Raven Klaasen (New Zealand) Michael Venus [6] | (Croatia) Nikola Mektić (Austria) Alexander Peya [7] | 7–6^{(7–5)}, 7–6^{(7–5)} |
| Afternoon | Singles Group Lleyton Hewitt | (South Africa) Kevin Anderson [4] | (Japan) Kei Nishikori [7] | 6–0, 6–1 |
| Evening | Doubles Group Llodra/Santoro | (United Kingdom) Jamie Murray (Brazil) Bruno Soares [4] | (Colombia) Juan Sebastián Cabal (Colombia) Robert Farah [2] | 6–4, 6–3 |
| Evening | Singles Group Lleyton Hewitt | (Switzerland) Roger Federer [2] | (Austria) Dominic Thiem [6] | 6–2, 6–3 |
Day 4 (14 November)
| Afternoon | Doubles Group Knowles/Nestor | (United States) Mike Bryan (United States) Jack Sock [5] | (Austria) Oliver Marach (Croatia) Mate Pavić [1] | 6–4, 7–6^{(7–4)} |
| Afternoon | Singles Group Guga Kuerten | (Serbia) Novak Djokovic [1] | (Germany) Alexander Zverev [3] | 6–4, 6–1 |
| Evening | Doubles Group Knowles/Nestor | (France) Pierre-Hugues Herbert (France) Nicolas Mahut [8] | (Poland) Łukasz Kubot (Brazil) Marcelo Melo [3] | 6–2, 6–4 |
| Evening | Singles Group Guga Kuerten | (Croatia) Marin Čilić [5] | (United States) John Isner [8] | 6–7^{(2–7)}, 6–3, 6–4 |
Day 5 (15 November)
| Afternoon | Doubles Group Llodra/Santoro | (United Kingdom) Jamie Murray (Brazil) Bruno Soares [4] | (Finland) Henri Kontinen (Australia) John Peers [9/Alt] | 3–6, 7–6^{(7–3)}, [10–3] |
| Afternoon | Singles Group Lleyton Hewitt | (Austria) Dominic Thiem [6] | (Japan) Kei Nishikori [7] | 6–1, 6–4 |
| Evening | Doubles Group Llodra/Santoro | (Colombia) Juan Sebastián Cabal (Colombia) Robert Farah [2] | (South Africa) Raven Klaasen (New Zealand) Michael Venus [6] | 6–3, 7–6^{(7–5)} |
| Evening | Singles Group Lleyton Hewitt | (Switzerland) Roger Federer [2] | (South Africa) Kevin Anderson [4] | 6–4, 6–3 |
Day 6 (16 November)
| Afternoon | Doubles Group Knowles/Nestor | (Poland) Łukasz Kubot (Brazil) Marcelo Melo [3] | (Austria) Oliver Marach (Croatia) Mate Pavić [1] | 7–6^{(7–4)}, 6–4 |
| Afternoon | Singles Group Guga Kuerten | (Germany) Alexander Zverev [3] | (United States) John Isner [8] | 7–6^{(7–5)}, 6–3 |
| Evening | Doubles Group Knowles/Nestor | (France) Pierre-Hugues Herbert (France) Nicolas Mahut [8] | (United States) Mike Bryan (United States) Jack Sock [5] | 6–2, 6–2 |
| Evening | Singles Group Guga Kuerten | (Serbia) Novak Djokovic [1] | (Croatia) Marin Čilić [5] | 7–6^{(9–7)}, 6–2 |
Day 7 (17 November)
| Afternoon | Doubles Semifinals | (United States) Mike Bryan (United States) Jack Sock [5] | (United Kingdom) Jamie Murray (Brazil) Bruno Soares [4] | 6–3, 4–6, [10–4] |
| Afternoon | Singles Semifinals | (Germany) Alexander Zverev [3] | (Switzerland) Roger Federer [2] | 7–5, 7–6^{(7–5)} |
| Evening | Doubles Semifinals | (France) Pierre-Hugues Herbert (France) Nicolas Mahut [8] | (Colombia) Juan Sebastián Cabal (Colombia) Robert Farah [2] | 6–3, 5–7, [10–5] |
| Evening | Singles Semifinals | (Serbia) Novak Djokovic [1] | (South Africa) Kevin Anderson [4] | 6–2, 6–2 |
Day 8 (18 November)
| Afternoon | Doubles Final | (United States) Mike Bryan (United States) Jack Sock [5] | (France) Pierre-Hugues Herbert (France) Nicolas Mahut [8] | 5–7, 6–1, [13–11] |
| Afternoon | Singles Final | (Germany) Alexander Zverev [3] | (Serbia) Novak Djokovic [1] | 6–4, 6–3 |

== See also ==
- ATP rankings
- 2018 WTA Finals
- 2018 WTA Elite Trophy
- 2018 Next Generation ATP Finals
