= 2018 China Open – Men's doubles =

Men's doubles
- 2018 China Open

Final
- Champions: (Poland) Łukasz Kubot (Brazil) Marcelo Melo
- Runners-up: (Austria) Oliver Marach (Croatia) Mate Pavić
- Score: 6–1, 6–4

Events
| Singles | men | women |
| Doubles | men | women |
| ← 2017 · | China Open | · 2019 → |

Henri Kontinen and John Peers were the defending champions but chose to compete in Tokyo instead.

Łukasz Kubot and Marcelo Melo won the title, defeating Oliver Marach and Mate Pavić in the final, 6–1, 6–4.

== Seeds ==
1. (Austria) Oliver Marach / (Croatia) Mate Pavić (final)
2. (Poland) Łukasz Kubot / (Brazil) Marcelo Melo (champions)
3. (Colombia) Juan Sebastián Cabal / (Colombia) Robert Farah (semifinals)
4. (Croatia) Ivan Dodig / (Croatia) Nikola Mektić (semifinals)

== Draw ==
=== Key ===
- Q = Qualifier
- WC = Wild card
- LL = Lucky loser
- Alt = Alternate
- SE = Special exempt
- PR = Protected ranking
- ITF = ITF entry
- JE = Junior exempt
- w/o = Walkover
- r = Retired
- d = Defaulted
- SR = Special ranking

=== Draw ===
First round
1 | (Austria) O Marach (Croatia) M Pavić | 6 | 6
(Italy) M Cecchinato (Spain) F Verdasco | 4 | 4
(New Zealand) M Daniell (Netherlands) W Koolhof | 6 | 1 | [10]
(Spain) F López (Spain) M López | 4 | 6 | [8]
4 | (Croatia) I Dodig (Croatia) N Mektić | 6 | 6
WC | (China) R Hua (China) Zh Zhang | 3 | 4
(Argentina) JM del Potro (Argentina) L Mayer | 6 | 3 | [11]
(Russia) A Rublev (Germany) A Zverev | 2 | 6 | [9]
(United States) N Monroe (United States) J Sock | 5 | 6^{3}
Q | (Ukraine) D Molchanov (Slovakia) I Zelenay | 7 | 7^{7}
(Netherlands) J-J Rojer (Romania) H Tecău | 6^{8} | 2
3 | (Colombia) JS Cabal (Colombia) R Farah | 7^{10} | 6
(India) R Bopanna (France) É Roger-Vasselin | 6 | 7^{7}
(United Kingdom) K Edmund (Hungary) M Fucsovics | 2 | 6^{5}
WC | (China) M Gong (China) Ze Zhang | 4 | 6 | [7]
2 | (Poland) Ł Kubot (Brazil) M Melo | 6 | 4 | [10]

Quarterfinals
1 | (Austria) O Marach (Croatia) M Pavić | 5 | 7^{7} | [14]
(New Zealand) M Daniell (Netherlands) W Koolhof | 7 | 6^{4} | [12]
4 | (Croatia) I Dodig (Croatia) N Mektić | 2 | 6 | [10]
(Argentina) JM del Potro (Argentina) L Mayer | 6 | 4 | [6]
Q | (Ukraine) D Molchanov (Slovakia) I Zelenay | 6 | 6^{2} | [8]
3 | (Colombia) JS Cabal (Colombia) R Farah | 4 | 7^{7} | [10]
(India) R Bopanna (France) É Roger-Vasselin | 6 | 4 | [10]
2 | (Poland) Ł Kubot (Brazil) M Melo | 4 | 6 | [12]

Semifinals
1 | (Austria) O Marach (Croatia) M Pavić | 7^{8} | 6
4 | (Croatia) I Dodig (Croatia) N Mektić | 6^{6} | 2
3 | (Colombia) JS Cabal (Colombia) R Farah | 4 | 6 | [6]
2 | (Poland) Ł Kubot (Brazil) M Melo | 6 | 1 | [10]

Final
1 | (Austria) O Marach (Croatia) M Pavić | 1 | 4
2 | (Poland) Ł Kubot (Brazil) M Melo | 6 | 6

== Qualifying ==
=== Seeds ===
1. (Czech Republic) Roman Jebavý / (Argentina) Andrés Molteni (qualifying competition)
2. (Moldova) Radu Albot / (Tunisia) Malek Jaziri (withdrew)

=== Qualifiers ===
1. (Ukraine) Denys Molchanov / (Slovakia) Igor Zelenay

=== Qualifying draw ===
First round
1 | (Czech Republic) Roman Jebavý (Argentina) Andrés Molteni | 6 | 6
(Spain) David Marrero (Italy) Andreas Seppi | 1 | 3
WC | (China) Li Zhe (China) Wu Di | 5 | 2
Alt | (Ukraine) Denys Molchanov (Slovakia) Igor Zelenay | 7 | 6

Qualifying competition
1 | (Czech Republic) Roman Jebavý (Argentina) Andrés Molteni | 6^{8} | 6 | [7]
Alt | (Ukraine) Denys Molchanov (Slovakia) Igor Zelenay | 7^{10} | 2 | [10]
