= 2018 ATP Finals – Singles =

Singles
- 2018 ATP Finals

Final
- Champion: (Germany) Alexander Zverev
- Runner-up: (Serbia) Novak Djokovic
- Score: 6–4, 6–3

Events
Singles	Doubles
- ATP Finals

Alexander Zverev defeated Novak Djokovic in the final, 6–4, 6–3 to win the singles tennis title at the 2018 ATP Finals. It was his first ATP Finals title.

Grigor Dimitrov was the reigning champion, but failed to qualify this year.

Rafael Nadal withdrew from the event due to an abdominal injury and was replaced by John Isner. Djokovic secured the year-end world No. 1 ranking. Juan Martín del Potro qualified for the first time since 2013, but withdrew with a knee injury and was replaced by Kei Nishikori.

Kevin Anderson and Isner made their tournament debuts.

== Seeds ==
1. (Serbia) Novak Djokovic (final)
2. (Switzerland) Roger Federer (semifinals)
3. (Germany) Alexander Zverev (champion)
4. (South Africa) Kevin Anderson (semifinals)
5. (Croatia) Marin Čilić (round robin)
6. (Austria) Dominic Thiem (round robin)
7. (Japan) Kei Nishikori (round robin)
8. (United States) John Isner (round robin)

== Alternates ==
1. (Russia) Karen Khachanov (Did not play)
2. (Croatia) Borna Ćorić (Did not play)

== Draw ==
Key

- Q = Qualifier
- WC = Wild card
- LL = Lucky loser
- Alt = Alternate
- ITF = ITF entry
- PR = Protected ranking
- SR = Special ranking
- SE = Special exempt
- JE = Junior exempt
- JR = Junior Accelerator Programme entrant
- CO = College Accelerator Programme entrant
- NG = Next Gen Accelerator Program entrant
- w/o = Walkover
- r = Retired
- d = Defaulted

=== Finals ===
Semifinals
1	(Serbia) Novak Djokovic	6	6
4	(South Africa) Kevin Anderson	2	2
2	(Switzerland) Roger Federer	5	6^{5}
3	(Germany) Alexander Zverev	7	7^{7}

Final
1	(Serbia) Novak Djokovic	4	3
3	(Germany) Alexander Zverev	6	6

=== Group Guga Kuerten ===
		(Serbia) Djokovic	(Germany) Zverev	(Croatia) Čilić	(United States) Isner	RR W–L	Set W–L	Game W–L	Standings
1	(Serbia) Novak Djokovic		6–4, 6–1	7–6^{(9–7)}, 6–2	6–4, 6–3	3–0	6–0 (100%)	37–20 (65%)	1
3	(Germany) Alexander Zverev	4–6, 1–6		7–6^{(7–5)}, 7–6^{(7–1)}	7–6^{(7–5)}, 6–3	2–1	4–2 (67%)	32–33 (49%)	2
5	(Croatia) Marin Čilić	6–7^{(7–9)}, 2–6	6–7^{(5–7)}, 6–7^{(1–7)}		6–7^{(2–7)}, 6–3, 6–4	1–2	2–5 (29%)	38–41 (48%)	3
8	(United States) John Isner	4–6, 3–6	6–7^{(5–7)}, 3–6	7–6^{(7–2)}, 3–6, 4–6		0–3	1–6 (14%)	30–43 (41%)	4

=== Group Lleyton Hewitt ===
		(Switzerland) Federer	(South Africa) Anderson	(Austria) Thiem	(Japan) Nishikori	RR W–L	Set W–L	Game W–L	Standings
2	(Switzerland) Roger Federer		6–4, 6–3	6–2, 6–3	6–7^{(4–7)}, 3–6	2–1	4–2 (67%)	33–25 (57%)	1
4	(South Africa) Kevin Anderson	4–6, 3–6		6–3, 7–6^{(12–10)}	6–0, 6–1	2–1	4–2 (67%)	32–22 (59%)	2
6	(Austria) Dominic Thiem	2–6, 3–6	3–6, 6–7^{(10–12)}		6–1, 6–4	1–2	2–4 (33%)	26–30 (46%)	3
7	(Japan) Kei Nishikori	7–6^{(7–4)}, 6–3	0–6, 1–6	1–6, 4–6		1–2	2–4 (33%)	19–33 (37%)	4

Standings are determined by: 1. number of wins; 2. number of matches played; 3. in two-player ties, head-to-head records; 4. in three-player ties, percentage of sets won, then percentage of games won, then ATP rankings.
