= 2018 Abierto Mexicano Telcel – Men's doubles =

Men's doubles
- 2018 Abierto Mexicano Telcel

Final
- Champions: (United Kingdom) Jamie Murray (Brazil) Bruno Soares
- Runners-up: (United States) Bob Bryan (United States) Mike Bryan
- Score: 7–6^{(7–4)}, 7–5

Events
Singles	men	women
Doubles	men	women
← 2017 ·	Abierto Mexicano Telcel	· 2019 →

Jamie Murray and Bruno Soares were the defending champions and successfully defended their title, defeating Bob and Mike Bryan in the final, 7–6^{(7–4)}, 7–5.

== Seeds ==
1. (Poland) Łukasz Kubot / (Brazil) Marcelo Melo (withdrew)
2. (Austria) Oliver Marach / (Croatia) Mate Pavić (quarterfinals)
3. (United Kingdom) Jamie Murray / (Brazil) Bruno Soares (champions)
4. (United States) Bob Bryan / (United States) Mike Bryan (final)

== Draw ==
=== Key ===
- Q = Qualifier
- WC = Wild card
- LL = Lucky loser
- Alt = Alternate
- SE = Special exempt
- PR = Protected ranking
- ITF = ITF entry
- JE = Junior exempt
- w/o = Walkover
- r = Retired
- d = Defaulted
- SR = Special ranking

=== Draw ===
First round
LL	(Belarus) M Mirnyi (Austria) P Oswald	7^{7}	3	[9]
(United States) R Harrison (United States) J Sock	6^{2}	6	[11]
(Germany) A Zverev (Germany) M Zverev	3	4
(Spain) F López (Spain) M López	6	6
4	(United States) B Bryan (United States) M Bryan	6	7
(France) F Martin (Croatia) F Škugor	2	5
(Mexico) S González (Chile) J Peralta	7^{9}	6
WC	(Spain) D Marrero (Spain) F Verdasco	6^{7}	3
(Japan) B McLachlan (United States) N Monroe	3	2
(Brazil) M Demoliner (United States) S Querrey	6	6
(South Korea) H Chung (Canada) D Shapovalov	6^{3}	2
3	(United Kingdom) J Murray (Brazil) B Soares	7^{7}	6
WC	(El Salvador) M Arévalo (Mexico) MÁ Reyes-Varela	4	4
(Croatia) N Mektić (Austria) A Peya	6	6
Q	(Moldova) R Albot (Georgia (country)) N Basilashvili	6^{9}	2
2	(Austria) O Marach (Croatia) M Pavić	7^{11}	6

Quarterfinals
(United States) R Harrison (United States) J Sock	6^{5}	6	[10]
(Spain) F López (Spain) M López	7^{7}	3	[5]
4	(United States) B Bryan (United States) M Bryan	6	7^{7}
(Mexico) S González (Chile) J Peralta	3	6^{2}
(Brazil) M Demoliner (United States) S Querrey	2	3
3	(United Kingdom) J Murray (Brazil) B Soares	6	6
(Croatia) N Mektić (Austria) A Peya	7	7
2	(Austria) O Marach (Croatia) M Pavić	5	5

Semifinals
(United States) R Harrison (United States) J Sock	5	6	[8]
4	(United States) B Bryan (United States) M Bryan	7	1	[10]
3	(United Kingdom) J Murray (Brazil) B Soares	7	6
(Croatia) N Mektić (Austria) A Peya	5	3

Final
4	(United States) B Bryan (United States) M Bryan	6^{4}	5
3	(United Kingdom) J Murray (Brazil) B Soares	7^{7}	7

== Qualifying ==
=== Seeds ===
1. (Belarus) Max Mirnyi / (Austria) Philipp Oswald (qualifying competition, Lucky losers)
2. (Moldova) Radu Albot / (Georgia (country)) Nikoloz Basilashvili (qualified)

=== Qualifiers ===
1. (Moldova) Radu Albot / (Georgia (country)) Nikoloz Basilashvili

=== Lucky losers ===
1. (Belarus) Max Mirnyi / (Austria) Philipp Oswald

=== Qualifying draw ===
First round					Qualifying competition
					1	(Belarus) Max Mirnyi (Austria) Philipp Oswald	7	5	[14]
					2	(Moldova) Radu Albot (Georgia (country)) Nikoloz Basilashvili	5	7	[16]
	(United States) Denis Kudla (Mexico) Luis Patiño	3	6	[8]	2	(Moldova) Radu Albot (Georgia (country)) Nikoloz Basilashvili	5	7	[16]
2	(Moldova) Radu Albot (Georgia (country)) Nikoloz Basilashvili	6	3	[10]
