= 2018 Barcelona Open Banco Sabadell =

- Date: 23–29 April
- Edition: 66th
- Category: ATP World Tour 500
- Draw: 48S / 16D
- Prize money: €2,324,905
- Surface: Clay
- Location: Barcelona, Spain
- Venue: Real Club de Tenis Barcelona

Champions

Singles
- (Spain) Rafael Nadal

Doubles
- (Spain) Feliciano López / (Spain) Marc López
← 2017 ·	Barcelona Open	· 2019 →

The 2018 Barcelona Open Banc Sabadell, also known as the Torneo Conde de Godó, was a men's tennis tournament played on outdoor clay courts. It was the 66th edition of the event and part of the ATP World Tour 500 series of the 2018 ATP World Tour. It took place at the Real Club de Tenis Barcelona in Barcelona, Catalonia, Spain, from 23 April until 29 April 2018. First-seeded Rafael Nadal won the singles title.

== Points and prize money ==
=== Points distribution ===
Event	W	F	SF	QF	Round of 16	Round of 32	Round of 64	Q	Q2	Q1
Singles	500	300	180	90	45	20	0	10	4	0
Doubles	500	300	180	90	0	—	—	45	25	0

=== Prize money ===
Event	W	F	SF	QF	Round of 16	Round of 32	Round of 64	Q2	Q1
Singles	€	€	€	€	€	€	€	€	€
Doubles	€	€	€	€	€	—	—	—	—

== Singles main-draw entrants ==
=== Seeds ===
Country	Player	Rank^{1}	Seed
ESP	Rafael Nadal	1	1
BUL	Grigor Dimitrov	5	2
AUT	Dominic Thiem	7	3
BEL	David Goffin	10	4
ESP	Pablo Carreño Busta	12	5
SRB	Novak Djokovic	13	6
ARG	Diego Schwartzman	15	7
ESP	Roberto Bautista Agut	16	8
KOR	~~Chung Hyeon~~	~~19~~	~~9~~
ESP	Albert Ramos Viñolas	24	10
FRA	Adrian Mannarino	26	11
ESP	Feliciano López	30	12
RUS	~~Andrey Rublev~~	~~33~~	~~13~~
JPN	Kei Nishikori	36	14
ESP	~~Fernando Verdasco~~	~~37~~	~~15~~
RUS	Karen Khachanov	38	16

- ^{1} Rankings as of April 16, 2018.

=== Other entrants ===
The following players received wildcards into the main draw:

- (Serbia) Novak Djokovic
- (Spain) Marcel Granollers
- (Spain) Pedro Martínez
- (Spain) Jaume Munar
- (Spain) Tommy Robredo

The following players received entry using a protected ranking:

- (Austria) Andreas Haider-Maurer

The following players received entry from the qualifying draw:

- (Brazil) Rogério Dutra Silva
- (United States) Bjorn Fratangelo
- (Belarus) Ilya Ivashka
- (Slovakia) Martin Kližan
- (France) Corentin Moutet
- (Spain) Ricardo Ojeda Lara

The following players received entry as lucky losers:

- (Spain) Pablo Andújar
- (United States) Ernesto Escobedo
- (Slovakia) Jozef Kovalík
- (Russia) Alexey Vatutin

=== Withdrawals ===
- (South Africa) Kevin Anderson → replaced by (Tunisia) Malek Jaziri
- (South Korea) Chung Hyeon → replaced by (Spain) Pablo Andújar
- (Spain) David Ferrer → replaced by (Serbia) Dušan Lajović
- (Germany) Philipp Kohlschreiber → replaced by (Russia) Alexey Vatutin
- (Russia) Andrey Rublev → replaced by (United States) Ernesto Escobedo
- (Spain) Fernando Verdasco → replaced by (Slovakia) Jozef Kovalík
- (Argentina) Horacio Zeballos → replaced by (Portugal) João Sousa

=== Retirements ===
- (Japan) Kei Nishikori

== Doubles main-draw entrants ==
=== Seeds ===
Country	Player	Country	Player	Rank^{1}	Seed
POL	Łukasz Kubot	BRA	Marcelo Melo	2	1
FIN	Henri Kontinen	AUS	John Peers	7	2
AUT	Oliver Marach	CRO	Mate Pavić	11	3
USA	~~Bob Bryan~~	USA	~~Mike Bryan~~	~~14~~	~~4~~

- Rankings are as of April 16, 2018.

=== Other entrants ===
The following pairs received wildcards into the doubles main draw:

- (Spain) Roberto Carballés Baena / (Spain) Albert Ramos Viñolas
- (Spain) Íñigo Cervantes / (Spain) David Marrero

The following pair received entry from the qualifying draw:

- (Spain) Jaume Munar / (Spain) Tommy Robredo

The following pairs entered as lucky losers:

- (United States) James Cerretani / (Spain) Guillermo García López
- (Chile) Nicolás Jarry / (Argentina) Guido Pella

=== Withdrawals ===
Before the tournament

- (United States) Mike Bryan
- (South Korea) Chung Hyeon

During the tournament

- (Croatia) Mate Pavić

== Finals ==
=== Singles ===
- (Spain) Rafael Nadal defeated (Greece) Stefanos Tsitsipas, 6–2, 6–1

=== Doubles ===
- (Spain) Feliciano López / (Spain) Marc López defeated (Pakistan) Aisam-ul-Haq Qureshi / (Netherlands) Jean-Julien Rojer, 7–6^{(7–5)}, 6–4
