= 2018 Barcelona Open Banco Sabadell – Doubles =

Doubles
- 2018 Barcelona Open Banco Sabadell

Final
- Champions: (Spain) Feliciano López (Spain) Marc López
- Runners-up: (Pakistan) Aisam-ul-Haq Qureshi (Netherlands) Jean-Julien Rojer
- Score: 7–6^{(7–5)}, 6–4

Events
Singles	Doubles
- Barcelona Open Banco Sabadell

Florin Mergea and Aisam-ul-Haq Qureshi were the defending champions, but Mergea chose to compete in Budapest instead. Qureshi played alongside Jean-Julien Rojer, but lost in the final to Feliciano López and Marc López, 6–7^{(5–7)}, 4–6.

Feliciano and Marc López became the first all-Spanish team in winning the tournament since 1997.

== Seeds ==
1. (Poland) Łukasz Kubot / (Brazil) Marcelo Melo (quarterfinals)
2. (Finland) Henri Kontinen / (Australia) John Peers (first round)
3. (Austria) Oliver Marach / (Croatia) Mate Pavić (quarterfinals, withdrew)
4. (United States) ~~Bob Bryan~~ / (United States) ~~Mike Bryan~~ (withdrew due to a low back injury on Mike)

== Draw ==
Key

- Q = Qualifier
- WC = Wild card
- LL = Lucky loser
- Alt = Alternate
- ITF = ITF entry
- PR = Protected ranking
- SR = Special ranking
- SE = Special exempt
- JE = Junior exempt
- JR = Junior Accelerator Programme entrant
- CO = College Accelerator Programme entrant
- NG = Next Gen Accelerator Program entrant
- w/o = Walkover
- r = Retired
- d = Defaulted

=== Draw ===
First round
1	(Poland) Ł Kubot (Brazil) M Melo	6	6
(Russia) K Khachanov (Argentina) D Schwartzman	3	0
Q	(Spain) J Munar (Spain) T Robredo	5	3
(Pakistan) A-u-H Qureshi (Netherlands) J-J Rojer	7	6
LL	(Chile) N Jarry (Argentina) G Pella	7	7
(United Kingdom) J Murray (Brazil) B Soares	5	5
LL	(United States) J Cerretani (Spain) G García López	0	4
(Uruguay) P Cuevas (Spain) M Granollers	6	6
(Croatia) I Dodig (United States) R Ram	2	4
(Spain) F López (Spain) M López	6	6
WC	(Spain) R Carballés Baena (Spain) A Ramos Viñolas	2	7	[11]
3	(Austria) O Marach (Croatia) M Pavić	6	5	[13]
(Colombia) JS Cabal (Colombia) R Farah	6	7
WC	(Spain) Í Cervantes (Spain) D Marrero	3	5
(India) R Bopanna (France) É Roger-Vasselin	7^{9}	6
2	(Finland) H Kontinen (Australia) J Peers	6^{7}	3

Quarterfinals
1	(Poland) Ł Kubot (Brazil) M Melo	5	6	[5]
(Pakistan) A-u-H Qureshi (Netherlands) J-J Rojer	7	3	[10]
LL	(Chile) N Jarry (Argentina) G Pella	2	6	[10]
(Uruguay) P Cuevas (Spain) M Granollers	6	4	[3]
(Spain) F López (Spain) M López	w/o
3	(Austria) O Marach (Croatia) M Pavić
(Colombia) JS Cabal (Colombia) R Farah	4	7^{11}	[13]
(India) R Bopanna (France) É Roger-Vasselin	6	6^{9}	[11]

Semifinals
(Pakistan) A-u-H Qureshi (Netherlands) J-J Rojer	7^{7}	3	[10]
LL	(Chile) N Jarry (Argentina) G Pella	6^{5}	6	[7]
(Spain) F López (Spain) M López	4	6	[10]
(Colombia) JS Cabal (Colombia) R Farah	6	3	[6]

Final
(Pakistan) A-u-H Qureshi (Netherlands) J-J Rojer	6^{5}	4
(Spain) F López (Spain) M López	7^{7}	6

== Qualifying ==
=== Seeds ===
1. (United States) James Cerretani / (Spain) Guillermo García López (first round, lucky losers)
2. (Argentina) Federico Delbonis / (Argentina) Leonardo Mayer (first round)

=== Qualifiers ===
1. (Spain) Jaume Munar / (Spain) Tommy Robredo

=== Lucky losers ===
1. (United States) James Cerretani / (Spain) Guillermo García López
2. (Chile) Nicolás Jarry / (Argentina) Guido Pella

=== Qualifying draw ===
First round
1	(United States) James Cerretani (Spain) Guillermo García López	4	3
WC	(Spain) Jaume Munar (Spain) Tommy Robredo	6	6
(Chile) Nicolás Jarry (Argentina) Guido Pella	4	6	[12]
2	(Argentina) Federico Delbonis (Argentina) Leonardo Mayer	6	1	[10]

Qualifying competition
WC	(Spain) Jaume Munar (Spain) Tommy Robredo	6^{4}	6	[11]
(Chile) Nicolás Jarry (Argentina) Guido Pella	7^{7}	3	[9]
