= 2018 Barcelona Open Banco Sabadell – Singles =

Singles
- 2018 Barcelona Open Banco Sabadell

Final
- Champion: (Spain) Rafael Nadal
- Runner-up: (Greece) Stefanos Tsitsipas
- Score: 6–2, 6–1

Details
- Draw: 48 (6 Q / 5 WC )
- Seeds: 16

Events
Singles	Doubles
- Barcelona Open Banco Sabadell

Two-time defending champion Rafael Nadal defeated Stefanos Tsitsipas in the final, 6–2, 6–1 to win the singles tennis title at the 2018 Barcelona Open. Nadal did not drop a set en route to his record-extending eleventh Barcelona Open title and his 20th ATP 500 title overall, equaling Roger Federer's record. He retained the world No. 1 singles ranking with the win. It was Tsitsipas' first ATP Tour final.

== Seeds ==
All seeds received a bye into the second round.

1. (Spain) Rafael Nadal (champion)
2. (Bulgaria) Grigor Dimitrov (quarterfinals)
3. (Austria) Dominic Thiem (quarterfinals)
4. (Belgium) David Goffin (semifinals)
5. (Spain) Pablo Carreño Busta (semifinals)
6. (Serbia) Novak Djokovic (second round)
7. (Argentina) Diego Schwartzman (second round)
8. (Spain) Roberto Bautista Agut (quarterfinals)

9. (South Korea) Chung Hyeon (withdrew)
10. (Spain) Albert Ramos Viñolas (third round)
11. (France) Adrian Mannarino (third round)
12. (Spain) Feliciano López (third round)
13. (Russia) Andrey Rublev (withdrew)
14. (Japan) Kei Nishikori (second round, retired)
15. (Spain) Fernando Verdasco (withdrew)
16. (Russia) Karen Khachanov (third round)

Click on the seed number of a player to go to their draw section.

== Draw ==
Key

- Q = Qualifier
- WC = Wild card
- LL = Lucky loser
- Alt = Alternate
- ITF = ITF entry
- PR = Protected ranking
- SR = Special ranking
- SE = Special exempt
- JE = Junior exempt
- JR = Junior Accelerator Programme entrant
- CO = College Accelerator Programme entrant
- NG = Next Gen Accelerator Program entrant
- w/o = Walkover
- r = Retired
- d = Defaulted

=== Finals ===
Quarterfinals
1	(Spain) Rafael Nadal	6	7
Q	(Slovakia) Martin Kližan	0	5
4	(Belgium) David Goffin	6^{3}	6	6
8	(Spain) Roberto Bautista Agut	7^{7}	2	2
(Greece) Stefanos Tsitsipas	6	6
3	(Austria) Dominic Thiem	3	2
5	(Spain) Pablo Carreño Busta	6	7^{7}
2	(Bulgaria) Grigor Dimitrov	3	6^{4}

Semifinals
1	(Spain) Rafael Nadal	6	6
4	(Belgium) David Goffin	4	0
(Greece) Stefanos Tsitsipas	7	6
5	(Spain) Pablo Carreño Busta	5	3

Final
1	(Spain) Rafael Nadal	6	6
(Greece) Stefanos Tsitsipas	2	1

=== Top half ===
==== Section 1 ====
First round
PR	(Austria) A Haider-Maurer	2	4
(Spain) R Carballés Baena	6	6
(Japan) Y Sugita	6^{5}	6^{5}
(Spain) G García López	7^{7}	7^{7}
WC	(Spain) P Martínez	4	7^{7}	3
(Serbia) D Lajović	6	6^{5}	6
Q	(Slovakia) M Kližan	6	6^{5}	6
(Argentina) F Delbonis	3	7^{7}	4

Second round
1	(Spain) R Nadal	6	6
(Spain) R Carballés Baena	4	4
(Spain) G García López	6	0
14	(Japan) K Nishikori	3	0^{r}
12	(Spain) F López	6	2	6
(Serbia) D Lajović	4	6	4
Q	(Slovakia) M Kližan	6	1	6
6/WC	(Serbia) N Djokovic	2	6	3

Third round
1	(Spain) R Nadal	6	6
(Spain) G García López	1	3
12	(Spain) F López	1	4
Q	(Slovakia) M Kližan	6	6

Quarterfinals
1	(Spain) R Nadal	6	7
Q	(Slovakia) M Kližan	0	5

==== Section 2 ====
First round
(Kazakhstan) M Kukushkin	2	2
WC	(Spain) M Granollers	6	6
(Argentina) L Mayer	6	6
(Germany) M Zverev	3	0
Q	(United States) B Fratangelo	7	5	6
LL	(Russia) A Vatutin	5	7	3
WC	(Spain) T Robredo	7^{7}	6^{8}	4
(Croatia) I Karlović	6^{5}	7^{10}	6

Second round
4	(Belgium) D Goffin	4	7^{7}	6
WC	(Spain) M Granollers	6	6^{2}	2
(Argentina) L Mayer	4	3
16	(Russia) K Khachanov	6	6
LL	(Spain) P Andújar	6	6
Q	(United States) B Fratangelo	4	3
(Croatia) I Karlović	7^{7}	2	4
8	(Spain) R Bautista Agut	6^{4}	6	6

Third round
4	(Belgium) D Goffin	2	7^{7}	6
16	(Russia) K Khachanov	6	6^{2}	0
LL	(Spain) P Andújar	4	1
8	(Spain) R Bautista Agut	6	6

Quarterfinals
4	(Belgium) D Goffin	6^{3}	6	6
8	(Spain) R Bautista Agut	7^{7}	2	2

=== Bottom half ===
==== Section 3 ====
First round
Q	(France) C Moutet	4	1
(Greece) S Tsitsipas	6	6
(United States) J Donaldson	3	1
Q	(Brazil) R Dutra Silva	6	6
(Germany) P Gojowczyk	4	4
(Argentina) G Pella	6	6
WC	(Spain) J Munar	6	3	7
(Portugal) J Sousa	4	6	5

Second round
7	(Argentina) D Schwartzman	2	1
(Greece) S Tsitsipas	6	6
Q	(Brazil) R Dutra Silva	6	3	4
10	(Spain) A Ramos Viñolas	3	6	6
LL	(Slovakia) J Kovalík	6	6
(Argentina) G Pella	3	3
WC	(Spain) J Munar	6^{8}	1
3	(Austria) D Thiem	7^{10}	6

Third round
(Greece) S Tsitsipas	6	7
10	(Spain) A Ramos Viñolas	4	5
LL	(Slovakia) J Kovalík	6^{5}	2
3	(Austria) D Thiem	7^{7}	6

Quarterfinals
(Greece) S Tsitsipas	6	6
3	(Austria) D Thiem	3	2

==== Section 4 ====
First round
(France) B Paire	7^{7}	6^{3}	6
(Chile) N Jarry	6^{4}	7^{7}	4
Q	(Spain) R Ojeda Lara	0	4
(Uruguay) P Cuevas	6	6
(United States) T Sandgren	4	4
(Tunisia) M Jaziri	6	6
Q	(Belarus) I Ivashka	2	3
(France) G Simon	6	6

Second round
5	(Spain) P Carreño Busta	6	6
(France) B Paire	3	3
(Uruguay) P Cuevas	4	6^{5}
11	(France) A Mannarino	6	7^{7}
LL	(United States) E Escobedo	4	3
(Tunisia) M Jaziri	6	6
(France) G Simon	2	1
2	(Bulgaria) G Dimitrov	6	6

Third round
5	(Spain) P Carreño Busta	6	4	7^{8}
11	(France) A Mannarino	2	6	6^{6}
(Tunisia) M Jaziri	5	6	6^{8}
2	(Bulgaria) G Dimitrov	7	3	7^{10}

Quarterfinals
5	(Spain) P Carreño Busta	6	7^{7}
2	(Bulgaria) G Dimitrov	3	6^{4}

== Qualifying ==
=== Seeds ===
1. (United States) Bjorn Fratangelo (qualified)
2. (Belarus) Ilya Ivashka (qualified)
3. (Brazil) Rogério Dutra Silva (qualified)
4. (Slovakia) Martin Kližan (qualified)
5. (Russia) Alexey Vatutin (qualifying competition, lucky loser)
6. (Slovakia) Andrej Martin (first round)
7. (France) Corentin Moutet (qualified)
8. (United States) Ernesto Escobedo (qualifying competition, lucky loser)
9. (Slovakia) Jozef Kovalík (qualifying competition, lucky loser)
10. (Spain) Pablo Andújar (qualifying competition, lucky loser)
11. (Germany) Matthias Bachinger (first round)
12. (Germany) Dustin Brown (qualifying competition)

=== Qualifiers ===
1. (United States) Bjorn Fratangelo
2. (Belarus) Ilya Ivashka
3. (Brazil) Rogério Dutra Silva
4. (Slovakia) Martin Kližan
5. (France) Corentin Moutet
6. (Spain) Ricardo Ojeda Lara

=== Lucky losers ===
1. (Russia) Alexey Vatutin
2. (United States) Ernesto Escobedo
3. (Slovakia) Jozef Kovalík
4. (Spain) Pablo Andújar

=== Qualifying draw ===
==== First qualifier ====
First round
1	(United States) Bjorn Fratangelo	7	6
(Italy) Alessandro Giannessi	5	4
WC	(Spain) Íñigo Cervantes	1	3
10/WC	(Spain) Pablo Andújar	6	6

Qualifying competition
1	(United States) Bjorn Fratangelo	0	7^{7}	6
10/WC	(Spain) Pablo Andújar	6	6^{4}	1

==== Second qualifier ====
First round
2	(Belarus) Ilya Ivashka	6	6
(France) Kenny de Schepper	3	3
PR	(Austria) Jürgen Melzer	6^{5}	6	7^{7}
11	(Germany) Matthias Bachinger	7^{7}	1	6^{4}

Qualifying competition
2	(Belarus) Ilya Ivashka	6	3	6
PR	(Austria) Jürgen Melzer	4	6	2

==== Third qualifier ====
First round
3	(Brazil) Rogério Dutra Silva	6	6
(Belarus) Egor Gerasimov	4	2
(Italy) Lorenzo Giustino	7^{7}	2	5
9	(Slovakia) Jozef Kovalík	6^{4}	6	7

Qualifying competition
3	(Brazil) Rogério Dutra Silva	7^{7}	6
9	(Slovakia) Jozef Kovalík	6^{3}	4

==== Fourth qualifier ====
First round
4	(Slovakia) Martin Kližan	6	6
(Belarus) Uladzimir Ignatik	3	4
WC	(Spain) Alejandro Davidovich Fokina	5	1
8	(United States) Ernesto Escobedo	7	6

Qualifying competition
4	(Slovakia) Martin Kližan	6	6
8	(United States) Ernesto Escobedo	4	2

==== Fifth qualifier ====
First round
5	(Russia) Alexey Vatutin	7^{7}	6
(France) Benjamin Bonzi	6^{3}	2
(Russia) Ivan Nedelko	2	4
7	(France) Corentin Moutet	6	6

Qualifying competition
5	(Russia) Alexey Vatutin	4	3
7	(France) Corentin Moutet	6	6

==== Sixth qualifier ====
First round
6	(Slovakia) Andrej Martin	6	4	2
(Spain) Ricardo Ojeda Lara	2	6	6
WC	(Spain) Gerard Granollers	5	2
12	(Germany) Dustin Brown	7	6

Qualifying competition
(Spain) Ricardo Ojeda Lara	4	6	6
12	(Germany) Dustin Brown	6	4	2
