= 2018 Rakuten Japan Open Tennis Championships – Doubles =

Doubles
- 2018 Rakuten Japan Open Tennis Championships

Final
- Champions: (Japan) Ben McLachlan (Germany) Jan-Lennard Struff
- Runners-up: (South Africa) Raven Klaasen (New Zealand) Michael Venus
- Score: 6–4, 7–5

Details
- Draw: 16 (1Q / 2WC)
- Seeds: 4

Events
Singles	Doubles
- Japan Open

Ben McLachlan and Yasutaka Uchiyama were the defending champions but chose not to participate together. McLachlan played alongside Jan-Lennard Struff and successfully defended the title, defeating Raven Klaasen and Michael Venus in the final, 6–4, 7–5. Uchiyama teamed up with Joe Salisbury, but lost in the semifinals to Klaasen and Venus.

== Seeds ==
1. (Finland) Henri Kontinen / (Australia) John Peers (first round)
2. (United Kingdom) Jamie Murray / (Brazil) Bruno Soares (quarterfinals)
3. (South Africa) Raven Klaasen / (New Zealand) Michael Venus (final)
4. (Japan) Ben McLachlan / (Germany) Jan-Lennard Struff (champions)

== Draw ==
Key

- Q = Qualifier
- WC = Wild card
- LL = Lucky loser
- Alt = Alternate
- ITF = ITF entry
- PR = Protected ranking
- SR = Special ranking
- SE = Special exempt
- JE = Junior exempt
- JR = Junior Accelerator Programme entrant
- CO = College Accelerator Programme entrant
- NG = Next Gen Accelerator Program entrant
- w/o = Walkover
- r = Retired
- d = Defaulted

=== Draw ===
First round
1	(Finland) H Kontinen (Australia) J Peers	6	6^{4}	[7]
Q	(France) F Martin (France) G Simon	3	7^{7}	[10]
(Netherlands) R Haase (Netherlands) M Middelkoop	6	6
(Russia) D Medvedev (Pakistan) A-u-H Qureshi	4	3
4	(Japan) B McLachlan (Germany) J-L Struff	7^{7}	7
(Chile) J Peralta (Argentina) H Zeballos	6^{4}	5
(South Korea) H Chung (Australia) M Ebden	6	6
(France) R Gasquet (France) A Mannarino	4	4
(United Kingdom) D Inglot (Croatia) F Škugor	7^{7}	6
(Bosnia and Herzegovina) D Džumhur (Mexico) S González	6^{3}	2
(United States) S Johnson (Argentina) D Schwartzman	5	2
3	(South Africa) R Klaasen (New Zealand) M Venus	7	6
WC	(Japan) Y Nishioka (Japan) K Uesugi	3	6^{5}
WC	(United Kingdom) J Salisbury (Japan) Y Uchiyama	6	7^{7}
(India) D Sharan (New Zealand) A Sitak	3	5
2	(United Kingdom) J Murray (Brazil) B Soares	6	7

Quarterfinals
Q	(France) F Martin (France) G Simon	6^{5}	6^{8}
(Netherlands) R Haase (Netherlands) M Middelkoop	7^{7}	7^{10}
4	(Japan) B McLachlan (Germany) J-L Struff	6	6
(South Korea) H Chung (Australia) M Ebden	4	4
(United Kingdom) D Inglot (Croatia) F Škugor	6	6^{7}	[9]
3	(South Africa) R Klaasen (New Zealand) M Venus	3	7^{9}	[11]
WC	(United Kingdom) J Salisbury (Japan) Y Uchiyama	7^{7}	4	[10]
2	(United Kingdom) J Murray (Brazil) B Soares	6^{4}	6	[3]

Semifinals
(Netherlands) R Haase (Netherlands) M Middelkoop	1	4
4	(Japan) B McLachlan (Germany) J-L Struff	6	6
3	(South Africa) R Klaasen (New Zealand) M Venus	4	7^{7}	[18]
WC	(United Kingdom) J Salisbury (Japan) Y Uchiyama	6	6^{2}	[16]

Final
4	(Japan) B McLachlan (Germany) J-L Struff	6	7
3	(South Africa) R Klaasen (New Zealand) M Venus	4	5

== Qualifying ==
=== Seeds ===
1. (Belarus) Max Mirnyi / (Austria) Philipp Oswald (first round)
2. (United States) James Cerretani / (Australia) Nick Kyrgios (qualifying competition)

=== Qualifiers ===
1. (France) Fabrice Martin / (France) Gilles Simon

=== Qualifying draw ===
First round
1	(Belarus) Max Mirnyi (Austria) Philipp Oswald	6	3	[10]
(France) Fabrice Martin (France) Gilles Simon	3	6	[12]
WC	(Japan) Yusuke Takahashi (Japan) Yosuke Watanuki	3	7	[11]
2	(United States) James Cerretani (Australia) Nick Kyrgios	6	5	[13]

Qualifying competition
(France) Fabrice Martin (France) Gilles Simon	7	6
2	(United States) James Cerretani (Australia) Nick Kyrgios	5	4
