= 2025 Rio Open =

Professional men's tennis tournament played on outdoor clay courts

- Date: 17–23 February
- Edition: 11th
- Draw: 32S / 16D
- Surface: Clay - outdoor
- Location: Rio de Janeiro, Brazil
- Venue: Jockey Club Brasileiro

Champions

Singles
- (Argentina) Sebastián Báez

Doubles
- (Brazil) Rafael Matos / (Brazil) Marcelo Melo
← 2024 ·	Rio Open	· 2026 →

The 2025 Rio Open, also known as Rio Open presented by Claro for sponsorship reasons, was a professional men's tennis tournament played on outdoor clay courts. It was the 11th edition of the Rio Open, and part of the ATP Tour 500 tournaments of the 2025 ATP Tour. It took place in Rio de Janeiro, Brazil between 17 and 23 February, 2025.

== Champions ==
=== Singles ===
- (Argentina) Sebastián Báez def. (France) Alexandre Müller, 6–2, 6–3

=== Doubles ===
- (Brazil) Rafael Matos / (Brazil) Marcelo Melo def. (Spain) Pedro Martínez / (Spain) Jaume Munar, 6–2, 7–5

== Singles main-draw entrants ==
=== Seeds ===
Country	Player	Rank^{1}	Seed
GER	Alexander Zverev	2	1
~~ITA~~	~~Lorenzo Musetti~~	~~16~~	~~2~~
CHI	Alejandro Tabilo	27	3
ARG	Francisco Cerúndolo	28	4
ARG	Sebastián Báez	31	5
CHI	Nicolás Jarry	40	6
ESP	Pedro Martínez	41	7
ARG	Tomás Martín Etcheverry	44	8

- ^{1} Rankings are as of 10 February 2025.

=== Other entrants ===
The following players received wildcards into the singles main draw:

- (Brazil) Gustavo Heide
- (Brazil) Felipe Meligeni Alves
- (Brazil) Thiago Monteiro

The following player received entry as a special exempt:

- (Brazil) João Fonseca

The following players received entry from the qualifying draw:

- (Chile) Tomás Barrios Vera
- (Argentina) Juan Manuel Cerúndolo
- (Bolivia) Hugo Dellien
- (Chinese Taipei) Tseng Chun-hsin

The following players received entry as lucky losers:

- (Argentina) Román Andrés Burruchaga
- (Portugal) Jaime Faria
- (Argentina) Camilo Ugo Carabelli

=== Withdrawals ===
- (Spain) Alejandro Davidovich Fokina → replaced by (Argentina) Camilo Ugo Carabelli
- (Italy) Lorenzo Musetti → replaced by (Portugal) Jaime Faria
- (Denmark) Holger Rune → replaced by (Argentina) Román Andrés Burruchaga

== Doubles main-draw entrants ==
=== Seeds ===
Country	Player	Country	Player	Rank^{1}	Seed
ARG	Máximo González	ARG	Andrés Molteni	61	1
URU	Ariel Behar	USA	Robert Galloway	66	2
FRA	Sadio Doumbia	FRA	Fabien Reboul	66	3
USA	Austin Krajicek	USA	Rajeev Ram	71	4

- ^{1} Rankings as of 10 February 2025.

=== Other entrants ===
The following pairs received wildcards into the doubles main draw:

- (Brazil) Marcelo Demoliner / (Brazil) Fernando Romboli
- (Brazil) Orlando Luz / (Brazil) Felipe Meligeni Alves

The following pair received entry from the qualifying draw:

- (Portugal) Francisco Cabral / (Netherlands) Jean-Julien Rojer

=== Withdrawals ===
- (Belgium) Sander Gillé / (Poland) Jan Zieliński → replaced by (Spain) Roberto Carballés Baena / (France) Alexandre Müller
