= 2018 Rio Open =

- Date: 19–25 February
- Edition: 5th
- Draw: 32S / 16D
- Prize money: $1,471,315 (ATP)
- Surface: Clay
- Location: Rio de Janeiro, Brazil
- Venue: Jockey Club Brasileiro

Champions

Singles
- (Argentina) Diego Schwartzman

Doubles
- (Spain) David Marrero / (Spain) Fernando Verdasco
← 2017 ·	Rio Open	· 2019 →

The 2018 Rio Open was a professional men's tennis tournament played on outdoor clay courts. It was the 5th edition of the tournament, and part of the ATP World Tour 500 series of the 2018 ATP World Tour. It took place in Rio de Janeiro, Brazil between February 19–25, 2018.

== Finals ==
=== Singles ===
- (Argentina) Diego Schwartzman defeated (Spain) Fernando Verdasco, 6–2, 6–3

=== Doubles ===
- (Spain) David Marrero / (Spain) Fernando Verdasco defeated (Croatia) Nikola Mektić / (Austria) Alexander Peya, 5–7, 7–5, [10–8]

== Points and prize money ==
=== Point distribution ===
Event	W	F	SF	QF	Round of 16	Round of 32	Q	Q2	Q1
Singles	500	300	180	90	45	0	20	10	0
Doubles	500	300	180	90	0	—	45	25	0

=== Prize money ===
Event	W	F	SF	QF	Round of 16	Round of 32^{1}	Q2	Q1
Singles	$314,880	$154,370	$77,680	$39,500	$20,515	$10,820	$2,395	$1,220
Doubles	$94,800	$46,410	$23,280	$11,950	$6,180	—	—	—
Doubles prize money per team

_{^{1} Qualifiers prize money is also the Round of 32 prize money}

== Singles main-draw entrants ==
=== Seeds ===
Country	Player	Rank^{1}	Seed
CRO	Marin Čilić	3	1
AUT	Dominic Thiem	6	2
ESP	Pablo Carreño Busta	10	3
ESP	Albert Ramos Viñolas	20	4
ITA	Fabio Fognini	22	5
ARG	Diego Schwartzman	24	6
URU	Pablo Cuevas	32	7
ESP	Fernando Verdasco	40	8

- ^{1} Rankings as of February 12, 2018.

=== Other entrants ===
The following players received wildcards into the singles main draw:

- (Brazil) Thomaz Bellucci
- (Brazil) Thiago Monteiro
- (Norway) Casper Ruud

The following players received entry using a protected ranking:

- (Spain) Pablo Andújar
- (Austria) Andreas Haider-Maurer

The following players received entry from the qualifying draw:

- (Argentina) Carlos Berlocq
- (Spain) Roberto Carballés Baena
- (Italy) Marco Cecchinato
- (France) ~~Corentin Moutet~~

The following player received entry as a lucky loser:

- (Portugal) Gastão Elias

=== Withdrawals ===
Before the tournament

- (Ukraine) Alexandr Dolgopolov → replaced by (United States) Tennys Sandgren
- (United Kingdom) Kyle Edmund → replaced by (Spain) Pablo Andújar
- (Italy) Paolo Lorenzi → replaced by (Austria) Gerald Melzer
- (France) Corentin Moutet → replaced by (Portugal) Gastão Elias
- (Germany) Cedrik-Marcel Stebe → replaced by (Argentina) Nicolás Kicker

=== Retirements ===
- (Spain) Pablo Andújar
- (Spain) Roberto Carballés Baena
- (Norway) Casper Ruud
- (Czech Republic) Jiří Veselý

== Doubles main-draw entrants ==
=== Seeds ===
Country	Player	Country	Player	Rank^{1}	Seed
POL	Łukasz Kubot	BRA	Marcelo Melo	2	1
GBR	Jamie Murray	BRA	Bruno Soares	19	2
COL	Juan Sebastián Cabal	COL	Robert Farah	35	3
MEX	Santiago González	CHI	Julio Peralta	57	4

- ^{1} Rankings as of February 12, 2018.

=== Other entrants ===
The following pairs received wildcards into the doubles main draw:

- (Brazil) Thomaz Bellucci / (Brazil) André Sá
- (Brazil) Fabiano de Paula / (Brazil) Thiago Monteiro

The following pair received entry from the qualifying draw:

- (Chile) Nicolás Jarry / (Czech Republic) Jiří Veselý

The following pair received entry as lucky losers:

- (Spain) David Marrero / (Spain) Fernando Verdasco

=== Withdrawals ===
Before the tournament

- (Spain) Pablo Carreño Busta
