= 2018 Rio Open – Doubles =

Doubles
- 2018 Rio Open

Final
- Champions: (Spain) David Marrero (Spain) Fernando Verdasco
- Runners-up: (Croatia) Nikola Mektić (Austria) Alexander Peya
- Score: 5–7, 7–5, [10–8]

Details
- Draw: 16
- Seeds: 4

Events
Singles	Doubles
← 2017 ·	Rio Open	· 2019 →

Pablo Carreño Busta and Pablo Cuevas were the defending champions, but withdrew before the tournament began.

David Marrero and Fernando Verdasco won the title, defeating Nikola Mektić and Alexander Peya in the final, 5–7, 7–5, [10–8]. Marrero and Verdasco were the first lucky loser team to win an ATP World Tour doubles title since 2014.

== Seeds ==
1. (Poland) Łukasz Kubot / (Brazil) Marcelo Melo (quarterfinals)
2. (United Kingdom) Jamie Murray / (Brazil) Bruno Soares (semifinals)
3. (Colombia) Juan Sebastián Cabal / (Colombia) Robert Farah (first round)
4. (Mexico) Santiago González / (Chile) Julio Peralta (quarterfinals)

== Draw ==
=== Key ===
- Q = Qualifier
- WC = Wild card
- LL = Lucky loser
- Alt = Alternate
- SE = Special exempt
- PR = Protected ranking
- ITF = ITF entry
- JE = Junior exempt
- w/o = Walkover
- r = Retired
- d = Defaulted
- SR = Special ranking

=== Draw ===
First round
1	(Poland) Ł Kubot (Brazil) M Melo	6	4	[10]
Q	(Chile) N Jarry (Czech Republic) J Veselý	4	6	[4]
(Argentina) A Molteni (Argentina) H Zeballos	6	6
WC	(Brazil) T Bellucci (Brazil) A Sá	1	3
3	(Colombia) JS Cabal (Colombia) R Farah	6^{5}	5
(Croatia) N Mektić (Austria) A Peya	7^{7}	7
(Argentina) G Pella (Argentina) D Schwartzman	6	2	[10]
(Chile) H Podlipnik-Castillo (Belarus) A Vasilevski	3	6	[3]
(Brazil) M Demoliner (France) G Monfils	6	1	[5]
LL	(Spain) D Marrero (Spain) F Verdasco	1	6	[10]
(Italy) F Fognini (Spain) M López	3	2
4	(Mexico) S González (Chile) J Peralta	6	6
(Czech Republic) R Jebavý (Argentina) L Mayer	6	6^{5}	[10]
(Spain) G García López (Spain) A Ramos Viñolas	2	7^{7}	[7]
WC	(Brazil) F de Paula (Brazil) T Monteiro	3	1
2	(United Kingdom) J Murray (Brazil) B Soares	6	6

Quarterfinals
1	(Poland) Ł Kubot (Brazil) M Melo	6^{4}	2
(Argentina) A Molteni (Argentina) H Zeballos	7^{7}	6
(Croatia) N Mektić (Austria) A Peya	7	6
(Argentina) G Pella (Argentina) D Schwartzman	5	3
LL	(Spain) D Marrero (Spain) F Verdasco	7	3	[10]
4	(Mexico) S González (Chile) J Peralta	5	6	[2]
(Czech Republic) R Jebavý (Argentina) L Mayer	3	4
2	(United Kingdom) J Murray (Brazil) B Soares	6	6

Semifinals
(Argentina) A Molteni (Argentina) H Zeballos	4	6	[7]
(Croatia) N Mektić (Austria) A Peya	6	3	[10]
LL	(Spain) D Marrero (Spain) F Verdasco	6	6
2	(United Kingdom) J Murray (Brazil) B Soares	4	4

Final
(Croatia) N Mektić (Austria) A Peya	7	5	[8]
LL	(Spain) D Marrero (Spain) F Verdasco	5	7	[10]

== Qualifying ==
=== Seeds ===
1. (Spain) David Marrero / (Spain) Fernando Verdasco (qualifying competition, lucky losers)
2. (Chile) Nicolás Jarry / (Czech Republic) Jiří Veselý (qualified)

=== Qualifiers ===
1. (Chile) Nicolás Jarry / (Czech Republic) Jiří Veselý

=== Lucky losers ===
1. (Spain) David Marrero / (Spain) Fernando Verdasco

=== Qualifying draw ===
First round
1	(Spain) David Marrero (Spain) Fernando Verdasco	6	6^{3}	[10]
(Austria) Gerald Melzer (United States) Tennys Sandgren	4	7^{7}	[4]
WC	(Brazil) Mateus Alves (Brazil) Fabrício Neis
2	(Chile) Nicolás Jarry (Czech Republic) Jiří Veselý	w/o

Qualifying competition
1	(Spain) David Marrero (Spain) Fernando Verdasco	6	3	[5]
2	(Chile) Nicolás Jarry (Czech Republic) Jiří Veselý	2	6	[10]
