= 2023 Rio Open =

Professional men's tennis tournament played on outdoor clay courts

- Date: 20–26 February
- Edition: 9th
- Draw: 28S / 16D
- Prize money: $2,013,940
- Surface: Clay - outdoor
- Location: Rio de Janeiro, Brazil
- Venue: Jockey Club Brasileiro

Champions

Singles
- (United Kingdom) Cameron Norrie

Doubles
- (Argentina) Máximo González / (Argentina) Andrés Molteni
← 2022 ·	Rio Open	· 2024 →

The 2023 Rio Open, also known as Rio Open presented by Claro for sponsorship reasons, was a professional men's tennis tournament played on outdoor clay courts. It was the 9th edition of the Rio Open, and part of the ATP Tour 500 of the 2023 ATP Tour. It took place in Rio de Janeiro, Brazil between February 20–26, 2023.

== Finals ==
=== Singles ===
- (United Kingdom) Cameron Norrie def. (Spain) Carlos Alcaraz, 5–7, 6–4, 7–5.

=== Doubles ===
- (Argentina) Máximo González / (Argentina) Andrés Molteni def. (Colombia) Juan Sebastián Cabal / (Brazil) Marcelo Melo, 6–1, 7–6^{(7–3)}

== Points and prize money ==
=== Point distribution ===
Event	W	F	SF	QF	Round of 16	Round of 32	Q	Q2	Q1
Singles	500	300	180	90	45	0	20	10	0
Doubles	500	300	180	90	0	—	—	—	—

=== Prize money ===
Event	W	F	SF	QF	Round of 16	Round of 32	Q2	Q1
Singles	$376,620	$202,640	$108,000	$55,170	$29,455	$15,710	$8,050	$4,515
Doubles*	$123,710	$65,980	$33,380	$16,690	$8,640	—	—	—
Doubles prize money per team

== Singles main-draw entrants ==
=== Seeds ===
Country	Player	Rank^{1}	Seed
ESP	Carlos Alcaraz	2	1
GBR	Cameron Norrie	12	2
ITA	Lorenzo Musetti	20	3
ARG	Francisco Cerúndolo	30	4
ARG	Diego Schwartzman	32	5
ARG	Sebastián Báez	36	6
ESP	Albert Ramos Viñolas	44	7
~~ARG~~	~~Federico Coria~~	~~49~~	~~8~~
SVK	Alex Molčan	51	9

- ^{1} Rankings are as of 13 February 2023.

=== Other entrants ===
The following players received wildcards into the singles main draw:

- (Brazil) Mateus Alves
- (Brazil) Thomaz Bellucci
- (Brazil) João Fonseca

The following players received entry using a protected ranking into the singles main draw:

- (Bolivia) Hugo Dellien
- (Austria) Dominic Thiem

The following player received entry into the singles main draw as a special exempt:

- (Peru) Juan Pablo Varillas

The following players received entry from the qualifying draw:

- (Argentina) Facundo Bagnis
- (Chile) Tomás Barrios Vera
- (France) Hugo Gaston
- (Chile) Nicolás Jarry

The following player received entry as a lucky loser:

- (Argentina) Juan Manuel Cerúndolo

=== Withdrawals ===
- (Argentina) Federico Coria → replaced by (Argentina) Juan Manuel Cerúndolo
- (Argentina) Guido Pella → replaced by (Serbia) Dušan Lajović

== Doubles main-draw entrants ==
=== Seeds ===
Country	Player	Country	Player	Rank^{1}	Seed
BRA	Rafael Matos	ESP	David Vega Hernández	54	1
COL	Juan Sebastián Cabal	BRA	Marcelo Melo	63	2
ITA	Simone Bolelli	ITA	Fabio Fognini	64	3
POR	Francisco Cabral	ARG	Horacio Zeballos	74	4

- ^{1} Rankings as of 13 February 2023.

=== Other entrants ===
The following pairs received wildcards into the doubles main draw:

- ~~(Brazil) Thomaz Bellucci~~ / ~~(Brazil) Thiago Monteiro~~
- (Brazil) Marcelo Demoliner / (Brazil) Felipe Meligeni Alves

The following pair received entry from the qualifying draw:

- (Serbia) Nikola Ćaćić / (Italy) Andrea Pellegrino

The following pair received entry as lucky losers:

- (Brazil) Mateus Alves / (Brazil) João Fonseca

=== Withdrawals ===
- (Brazil) Thomaz Bellucci / (Brazil) Thiago Monteiro → replaced by (Brazil) Mateus Alves / (Brazil) João Fonseca
- (Argentina) Federico Coria / (Argentina) Diego Schwartzman → replaced by (Argentina) Tomás Martín Etcheverry / (Argentina) Diego Schwartzman
- (Spain) Marcel Granollers / (Argentina) Horacio Zeballos → replaced by (Portugal) Francisco Cabral / (Argentina) Horacio Zeballos
- (United Kingdom) Jamie Murray / (New Zealand) Michael Venus → replaced by (France) Sadio Doumbia / (France) Fabien Reboul
- (Italy) Lorenzo Musetti / (Italy) Andrea Vavassori → replaced by (Austria) Alexander Erler / (Austria) Lucas Miedler
