= 2016 Rio Open – Men's doubles =

Men's doubles
- 2016 Rio Open

Final
- Champions: (Colombia) Juan Sebastián Cabal (Colombia) Robert Farah
- Runners-up: (Spain) Pablo Carreño Busta (Spain) David Marrero
- Score: 7–6^{(7–5)}, 6–1

Details
- Draw: 16
- Seeds: 4

Events
Singles	men	women
Doubles	men	women
← 2015 ·	Rio Open	· 2017 →

Martin Kližan and Philipp Oswald were the defending champions, but Kližan chose not to participate this year. Oswald played alongside Guillermo Durán, but lost in the first round to Rogério Dutra Silva and João Souza.
Juan Sebastián Cabal and Robert Farah won the title, defeating Pablo Carreño Busta and David Marrero in the final, 7–6^{(7–5)}, 6–1.

== Seeds ==
1. (Brazil) Marcelo Melo / (Brazil) Bruno Soares (semifinals)
2. (Colombia) Juan Sebastián Cabal / (Colombia) Robert Farah (champions)
3. (Uruguay) Pablo Cuevas / (Italy) Fabio Fognini (withdrew)
4. (United States) Nicholas Monroe / (United States) Jack Sock (first round, retired)

== Draw ==
=== Key ===
- Q = Qualifier
- WC = Wild card
- LL = Lucky loser
- Alt = Alternate
- SE = Special exempt
- PR = Protected ranking
- ITF = ITF entry
- JE = Junior exempt
- w/o = Walkover
- r = Retired
- d = Defaulted
- SR = Special ranking

=== Draw ===
First round
1	(Brazil) M Melo (Brazil) B Soares	6	6
WC	(Brazil) F de Paula (Brazil) O Luz	2	3
(Serbia) D Lajović (Austria) D Thiem	7	7
(Ukraine) A Dolgopolov (Spain) D Muñoz de la Nava	5	5
LL	(Argentina) G Durán (Austria) P Oswald	2	7^{7}	[8]
WC	(Brazil) R Dutra Silva (Brazil) J Souza	6	6^{3}	[10]
(Germany) P Petzschner (Austria) A Peya	3	6	[9]
Q	(Spain) P Carreño Busta (Spain) D Marrero	6	3	[11]
(United Kingdom) A Bedene (Spain) A Ramos-Viñolas	7^{8}	6^{4}	[4]
(Brazil) T Bellucci (Brazil) M Demoliner	6^{6}	7^{7}	[10]
(France) P-H Mathieu (France) J-W Tsonga	4	0
4	(United States) N Monroe (United States) J Sock	6	3^{r}
(Argentina) F Delbonis (Italy) P Lorenzi	6	6
(Argentina) M González (Brazil) A Sá	4	4
(New Zealand) M Daniell (New Zealand) A Sitak	2	2
2	(Colombia) JS Cabal (Colombia) R Farah	6	6

Quarterfinals
1	(Brazil) M Melo (Brazil) B Soares	6	6
(Serbia) D Lajović (Austria) D Thiem	3	4
WC	(Brazil) R Dutra Silva (Brazil) J Souza	4	5
Q	(Spain) P Carreño Busta (Spain) D Marrero	6	7
(Brazil) T Bellucci (Brazil) M Demoliner	7	6
(France) P-H Mathieu (France) J-W Tsonga	5	2
(Argentina) F Delbonis (Italy) P Lorenzi	2	6	[10]
2	(Colombia) JS Cabal (Colombia) R Farah	6	1	[12]

Semifinals
1	(Brazil) M Melo (Brazil) B Soares	2	6	[7]
Q	(Spain) P Carreño Busta (Spain) D Marrero	6	3	[10]
(Brazil) T Bellucci (Brazil) M Demoliner	4	4
2	(Colombia) JS Cabal (Colombia) R Farah	6	6

Final
Q	(Spain) P Carreño Busta (Spain) D Marrero	6^{5}	1
2	(Colombia) JS Cabal (Colombia) R Farah	7^{7}	6

== Qualifying ==
=== Seeds ===
1. (Argentina) Guillermo Durán / (Austria) Philipp Oswald (qualifying competition, lucky losers)
2. (Spain) Pablo Carreño Busta / (Spain) David Marrero (qualified)

=== Qualifiers ===
1. (Spain) Pablo Carreño Busta / (Spain) David Marrero

=== Lucky losers ===
1. (Argentina) Guillermo Durán / (Austria) Philipp Oswald

=== Qualifying draw ===
First round
1	(Argentina) Guillermo Durán (Austria) Philipp Oswald	7^{7}	6
WC	(Brazil) Guilherme Clezar (Brazil) André Ghem	6^{3}	4
(Spain) Pablo Andújar (Spain) Daniel Gimeno-Traver	0	6^{4}
2	(Spain) Pablo Carreño Busta (Spain) David Marrero	6	7^{7}

Qualifying competition
1	(Argentina) Guillermo Durán (Austria) Philipp Oswald	4	6	[6]
2	(Spain) Pablo Carreño Busta (Spain) David Marrero	6	3	[10]
