= 2025 Rio Open – Doubles =

Doubles
- 2025 Rio Open

Final
- Champions: (Brazil) Rafael Matos (Brazil) Marcelo Melo
- Runners-up: (Spain) Pedro Martínez (Spain) Jaume Munar
- Score: 6–2, 7–5

Details
- Draw: 16
- Seeds: 4

Events
Singles	Doubles
← 2024 ·	Rio Open	· 2026 →

Defending champion Rafael Matos and his partner Marcelo Melo defeated Pedro Martínez and Jaume Munar in the final, 6–2, 7–5 to win the doubles tennis title at the 2025 Rio Open. At 41 years of age, Melo was the oldest champion in the tournament's history. By lifting his 39th title, Melo tied Mate Pavić for the most doubles titles among active players.

Nicolás Barrientos was the other defending champion. He partnered Grégoire Jacq, but they lost in the first round to Marcelo Demoliner and Fernando Romboli.

== Seeds ==
1. (Argentina) Máximo González / (Argentina) Andrés Molteni (semifinals)
2. (Uruguay) Ariel Behar / (United States) Robert Galloway (first round)
3. (France) Sadio Doumbia / (France) Fabien Reboul (quarterfinals)
4. (United States) Austin Krajicek / (United States) Rajeev Ram (first round)

== Draw ==
=== Key ===
- Q = Qualifier
- WC = Wild card
- LL = Lucky loser
- Alt = Alternate
- SE = Special exempt
- PR = Protected ranking
- ITF = ITF entry
- JE = Junior exempt
- w/o = Walkover
- r = Retired
- d = Defaulted
- SR = Special ranking

=== Draw ===
First round
1	(Argentina) M González (Argentina) A Molteni	7^{8}	4	[10]
(Netherlands) S Arends (United Kingdom) L Johnson	6^{6}	6	[7]
(Colombia) N Barrientos (France) G Jacq	4	6^{2}
WC	(Brazil) M Demoliner (Brazil) F Romboli	6	7^{7}
3	(France) S Doumbia (France) F Reboul	6	6
(Mexico) S González (Austria) L Miedler	3	3
(Spain) P Martínez (Spain) J Munar	6	6
(Spain) R Carballés Baena (France) A Müller	3	4
(Austria) A Erler (Germany) C Frantzen	6^{5}	2
Q	(Portugal) F Cabral (Netherlands) J-J Rojer	7^{7}	6
(Brazil) R Matos (Brazil) M Melo	5	7^{7}	[10]
4	(United States) A Krajicek (United States) R Ram	7	6^{5}	[4]
(Italy) L Darderi (Argentina) M Navone	1	7^{7}	[11]
(Argentina) F Cerúndolo (Argentina) TM Etcheverry	6	6^{4}	[9]
WC	(Brazil) O Luz (Brazil) F Meligeni Alves	6	7^{7}
2	(Uruguay) A Behar (United States) R Galloway	4	6^{4}

Quarterfinals
1	(Argentina) M González (Argentina) A Molteni	7	7^{7}
WC	(Brazil) M Demoliner (Brazil) F Romboli	5	6^{0}
3	(France) S Doumbia (France) F Reboul	4	3
(Spain) P Martínez (Spain) J Munar	6	6
Q	(Portugal) F Cabral (Netherlands) J-J Rojer	4	3
(Brazil) R Matos (Brazil) M Melo	6	6
(Italy) L Darderi (Argentina) M Navone	3	7	[10]
WC	(Brazil) O Luz (Brazil) F Meligeni Alves	6	5	[6]

Semifinals
1	(Argentina) M González (Argentina) A Molteni	4	4
(Spain) P Martínez (Spain) J Munar	6	6
(Brazil) R Matos (Brazil) M Melo	6^{3}	6	[10]
(Italy) L Darderi (Argentina) M Navone	7^{7}	3	[5]

Final
(Spain) P Martínez (Spain) J Munar	2	5
(Brazil) R Matos (Brazil) M Melo	6	7

== Qualifying ==
=== Seeds ===
1. (Portugal) Francisco Cabral / (Netherlands) Jean-Julien Rojer (qualified)
2. (United States) Ryan Seggerman / (Australia) John-Patrick Smith (first round)

=== Qualifiers ===
1. (Portugal) Francisco Cabral / (Netherlands) Jean-Julien Rojer

=== Qualifying draw ===
First round
1	(Portugal) Francisco Cabral (Netherlands) Jean-Julien Rojer	6	6
Alt	(Bolivia) Boris Arias (Bolivia) Federico Zeballos	2	1
WC	(Brazil) Gustavo Heide (Brazil) Marcelo Zormann	6	6^{0}	[10]
2	(United States) Ryan Seggerman (Australia) John-Patrick Smith	4	7^{7}	[4]

Qualifying competition
1	(Portugal) Francisco Cabral (Netherlands) Jean-Julien Rojer	6	6^{2}	[10]
WC	(Brazil) Gustavo Heide (Brazil) Marcelo Zormann	1	7^{7}	[8]
