= 2016 Rio Open – Women's doubles =

Women's doubles
- 2016 Rio Open

Final
- Champions: (Paraguay) Verónica Cepede Royg (Argentina) María Irigoyen
- Runners-up: (United Kingdom) Tara Moore (Switzerland) Conny Perrin
- Score: 6–1, 7–6^{(7–5)}

Events
Singles	men	women
Doubles	men	women
← 2015 ·	Rio Open	· 2017 →

Ysaline Bonaventure and Rebecca Peterson were the defending champions, but Bonaventure chose not to participate this year. Peterson played alongside Julia Glushko but lost in the first round to Paula Cristina Gonçalves and Sanaz Marand.
Verónica Cepede Royg and María Irigoyen won the title, defeating Tara Moore and Conny Perrin in the final, 6–1, 7–6^{(7–5)}.

== Seeds ==
1. (Australia) Anastasia Rodionova / (Liechtenstein) Stephanie Vogt (quarterfinals)
2. (New Zealand) Marina Erakovic / (Spain) Sílvia Soler Espinosa (quarterfinals)
3. (Montenegro) Danka Kovinić / (Romania) Andreea Mitu (first round)
4. (Paraguay) Verónica Cepede Royg / (Argentina) María Irigoyen (champions)

== Draw ==
=== Key ===
- Q = Qualifier
- WC = Wild card
- LL = Lucky loser
- Alt = Alternate
- SE = Special exempt
- PR = Protected ranking
- ITF = ITF entry
- JE = Junior exempt
- w/o = Walkover
- r = Retired
- d = Defaulted
- SR = Special ranking

First round
1	(Australia) An Rodionova (Liechtenstein) S Vogt	7^{7}	4	[10]
(Brazil) B Haddad Maia (Brazil) T Pereira	6^{5}	6	[8]
(Colombia) M Duque Mariño (Germany) T Maria	4	6	[12]
(Romania) E Bogdan (Romania) M Buzărnescu	6	3	[10]
4	(Paraguay) V Cepede Royg (Argentina) M Irigoyen	6	6^{4}	[10]
(Spain) L Pous Tió (Georgia (country)) S Shapatava	3	7^{7}	[6]
(Brazil) PC Gonçalves (United States) S Marand	4	6	[10]
(Israel) J Glushko (Sweden) R Peterson	6	4	[7]
(Brazil) G Cé (Bulgaria) E Kostova	4	5
(United States) C McHale (United States) A Tatishvili	6	7
WC	(France) A Lim (Italy) F Schiavone	6	6
3	(Montenegro) D Kovinić (Romania) A Mitu	4	1
(Netherlands) C Burger (Brazil) L Pigossi	2	1
(United Kingdom) T Moore (Switzerland) C Perrin	6	6
WC	(Brazil) C Alves (Canada) H El Tabakh	2	2
2	(New Zealand) M Erakovic (Spain) S Soler Espinosa	6	6

Quarterfinals
1	(Australia) An Rodionova (Liechtenstein) S Vogt	6^{2}	6	[5]
(Colombia) M Duque Mariño (Germany) T Maria	7^{7}	4	[10]
4	(Paraguay) V Cepede Royg (Argentina) M Irigoyen	7^{7}	6
(Brazil) PC Gonçalves (United States) S Marand	6^{5}	0
(United States) C McHale (United States) A Tatishvili	3	6	[8]
WC	(France) A Lim (Italy) F Schiavone	6	3	[10]
(United Kingdom) T Moore (Switzerland) C Perrin	7^{7}	0	[10]
2	(New Zealand) M Erakovic (Spain) S Soler Espinosa	6^{4}	6	[8]

Semifinals
(Colombia) M Duque Mariño (Germany) T Maria	4	6	[9]
4	(Paraguay) V Cepede Royg (Argentina) M Irigoyen	6	3	[11]
WC	(France) A Lim (Italy) F Schiavone
(United Kingdom) T Moore (Switzerland) C Perrin	w/o

Final
4	(Paraguay) V Cepede Royg (Argentina) M Irigoyen	6	7^{7}
(United Kingdom) T Moore (Switzerland) C Perrin	1	6^{5}
