= 2026 Rio Open – Doubles =

Doubles
- 2026 Rio Open

Final
- Champions: (Brazil) João Fonseca (Brazil) Marcelo Melo
- Runners-up: (Germany) Constantin Frantzen (Netherlands) Robin Haase
- Score: 4–6, 6–3, [10–8]

Details
- Draw: 16
- Seeds: 4

Events
Singles	Doubles
- Rio Open

Defending champion Marcelo Melo and his partner João Fonseca defeated Constantin Frantzen and Robin Haase in the final, 4–6, 6–3, [10–8] to win the doubles tennis title at the 2026 Rio Open. It was the first ATP Tour doubles title for Fonseca and 41st for Melo.

Rafael Matos and Melo were the reigning champions, but chose not to compete together. Matos partnered Orlando Luz, but lost in the first round to Guido Andreozzi and Manuel Guinard.

== Seeds ==
1. (France) Sadio Doumbia / (France) Fabien Reboul (quarterfinals)
2. (Argentina) Máximo González / (Argentina) Andrés Molteni (quarterfinals)
3. (Argentina) Guido Andreozzi / (France) Manuel Guinard (semifinals)
4. (United States) Evan King / (Australia) John Peers (first round)

== Draw ==
Key

- Q = Qualifier
- WC = Wild card
- LL = Lucky loser
- Alt = Alternate
- ITF = ITF entry
- PR = Protected ranking
- SR = Special ranking
- SE = Special exempt
- JE = Junior exempt
- JR = Junior Accelerator Programme entrant
- CO = College Accelerator Programme entrant
- NG = Next Gen Accelerator Program entrant
- w/o = Walkover
- r = Retired
- d = Defaulted

=== Draw ===
First round
1	(France) S Doumbia (France) F Reboul	6	6
(Brazil) M Demoliner (Brazil) F Romboli	3	3
(Germany) C Frantzen (Netherlands) R Haase	6	6
(Italy) L Darderi (Argentina) TM Etcheverry	3	4
3	(Argentina) G Andreozzi (France) M Guinard	3	6	[10]
(Brazil) O Luz (Brazil) R Matos	6	3	[6]
(Belgium) S Gillé (Netherlands) S Verbeek	6	6^{4}	[9]
WC	(Brazil) F Meligeni Alves (Brazil) M Zormann	4	7^{7}	[11]
LL	(Colombia) N Barrientos (Argentina) TA Tirante	5	3
(Germany) J Schnaitter (Germany) M Wallner	7	6
LL	(Brazil) G Heide (Brazil) LG Miguel	6	7^{10}
4	(United States) E King (Australia) J Peers	0	6^{8}
WC	(Brazil) J Fonseca (Brazil) M Melo	6	6
Alt	(Argentina) RA Burruchaga (Italy) A Pellegrino	4	4
Q	(Ecuador) G Escobar (Netherlands) J-J Rojer	3	3
2	(Argentina) M González (Argentina) A Molteni	6	6

Quarterfinals
1	(France) S Doumbia (France) F Reboul	2	6^{5}
(Germany) C Frantzen (Netherlands) R Haase	6	7^{7}
3	(Argentina) G Andreozzi (France) M Guinard	6	7^{7}
WC	(Brazil) F Meligeni Alves (Brazil) M Zormann	3	6^{4}
(Germany) J Schnaitter (Germany) M Wallner	7	5	[11]
LL	(Brazil) G Heide (Brazil) LG Miguel	5	7	[9]
WC	(Brazil) J Fonseca (Brazil) M Melo	6	6
2	(Argentina) M González (Argentina) A Molteni	4	0

Semifinals
(Germany) C Frantzen (Netherlands) R Haase	7^{17}	2	[10]
3	(Argentina) G Andreozzi (France) M Guinard	6^{15}	6	[8]
(Germany) J Schnaitter (Germany) M Wallner	2	6	[11]
WC	(Brazil) J Fonseca (Brazil) M Melo	6	2	[13]

Final
(Germany) C Frantzen (Netherlands) R Haase	6	3	[8]
WC	(Brazil) J Fonseca (Brazil) M Melo	4	6	[10]

== Qualifying ==
=== Seeds ===
1. (Ecuador) Gonzalo Escobar / (Netherlands) Jean-Julien Rojer (qualified)
2. (Spain) Pedro Martínez / (Argentina) Camilo Ugo Carabelli (withdrew)

=== Qualifiers ===
1. (Ecuador) Gonzalo Escobar / (Netherlands) Jean-Julien Rojer

=== Lucky losers ===
1. (Brazil) Gustavo Heide / (Brazil) Luís Guto Miguel

=== Qualifying draw ===
First round
1	(Ecuador) Gonzalo Escobar (Netherlands) Jean-Julien Rojer	6	6
(Colombia) Nicolás Barrientos (Argentina) Thiago Agustín Tirante	4	4
WC	(Brazil) Gustavo Heide (Brazil) Luís Guto Miguel	6	6
Alt	(Spain) Íñigo Cervantes (Peru) Ignacio Buse	1	4

Qualifying competition
1	(Ecuador) Gonzalo Escobar (Netherlands) Jean-Julien Rojer	4	7	[10]
WC	(Brazil) Gustavo Heide (Brazil) Luís Guto Miguel	6	5	[1]
