= 2026 Rio Open – Singles =

Singles
- 2026 Rio Open

Final
- Champion: (Argentina) Tomás Martín Etcheverry
- Runner-up: (Chile) Alejandro Tabilo
- Score: 3–6, 7–6^{(7–3)}, 6–4

Details
- Draw: 32 (4 Q / 3 WC )
- Seeds: 8

Events
Singles	Doubles
- Rio Open

Tomás Martín Etcheverry defeated Alejandro Tabilo in the final, 3–6, 7–6^{(7–3)}, 6–4 to win the singles tennis title at the 2026 Rio Open. It was his first ATP Tour title.

Sebastián Báez was the two-time defending champion, but lost in the first round to Jaime Faria.

== Seeds ==
1. (Argentina) Francisco Cerúndolo (second round, retired)
2. (Italy) Luciano Darderi (first round)
3. (Brazil) João Fonseca (second round)
4. (Argentina) Sebastián Báez (first round)
5. (Argentina) Camilo Ugo Carabelli (first round)
6. (France) Alexandre Müller (withdrew)
7. (Germany) Daniel Altmaier (first round)
8. (Argentina) Tomás Martín Etcheverry (champion)

== Draw ==
Key

- Q = Qualifier
- WC = Wild card
- LL = Lucky loser
- Alt = Alternate
- ITF = ITF entry
- PR = Protected ranking
- SR = Special ranking
- SE = Special exempt
- JE = Junior exempt
- JR = Junior Accelerator Programme entrant
- CO = College Accelerator Programme entrant
- NG = Next Gen Accelerator Program entrant
- w/o = Walkover
- r = Retired
- d = Defaulted

=== Finals ===
Semifinals
(Chile) Alejandro Tabilo	6	6
(Peru) Ignacio Buse	3	3
8	(Argentina) Tomás Martín Etcheverry	4	7^{7}	7^{7}
(Czech Republic) Vít Kopřiva	6	6^{2}	6^{4}

Final
(Chile) Alejandro Tabilo	6	6^{3}	4
8	(Argentina) Tomás Martín Etcheverry	3	7^{7}	6

=== Top half ===
First round
1	(Argentina) F Cerúndolo	6	6
(Argentina) M Navone	3	4
(Chile) C Garín	5	3
(Argentina) TA Tirante	7	6
(Chile) A Tabilo	6	6
(United States) E Nava	3	3
Q	(Croatia) D Prižmić	3	4
LL	(Italy) F Passaro	6	6
3	(Brazil) J Fonseca	7^{7}	6
Q	(Brazil) T Monteiro	6^{1}	1
Q	(Brazil) I Marcondes	6	5	4
(Peru) I Buse	4	7	6
LL	(Chile) T Barrios Vera	6^{1}	5
(Italy) M Berrettini	7^{7}	7
LL	(Serbia) D Lajović	6	7^{9}
7	(Germany) D Altmaier	4	6^{7}

Second round
1	(Argentina) F Cerúndolo	2	1^{r}
(Argentina) TA Tirante	6	3
(Chile) A Tabilo	4	7^{7}	6
LL	(Italy) F Passaro	6	6^{0}	2
3	(Brazil) J Fonseca	7	3	4
(Peru) I Buse	5	6	6
(Italy) M Berrettini	3	6	6
LL	(Serbia) D Lajović	6	4	2

Quarterfinals
(Argentina) TA Tirante	6^{2}	7^{8}	1
(Chile) A Tabilo	7^{7}	6^{6}	6
(Peru) I Buse	6	2	6
(Italy) M Berrettini	3	6	3

Semifinals
(Chile) A Tabilo	6	6
(Peru) I Buse	3	3

=== Bottom half ===
First round
8	(Argentina) TM Etcheverry	3	6	6
(Argentina) F Comesaña	6	3	4
WC	(Brazil) LG Miguel	3	6	2
Q	(Lithuania) V Gaubas	6	2	6
(Bosnia and Herzegovina) D Džumhur	0	7^{7}	6
(Spain) P Martínez	6	6^{5}	4
LL	(Portugal) J Faria	7	6
4	(Argentina) S Báez	5	1
5	(Argentina) C Ugo Carabelli	3	4
(Argentina) RA Burruchaga	6	6
WC	(Brazil) G Heide	2	6^{5}
(Czech Republic) V Kopřiva	6	7^{7}
(Germany) Y Hanfmann	7^{7}	6
WC	(Brazil) JL Reis da Silva	6^{3}	4
(Argentina) JM Cerúndolo	6	3	6
2	(Italy) L Darderi	1	6	4

Second round
8	(Argentina) TM Etcheverry	7^{7}	6
Q	(Lithuania) V Gaubas	6^{1}	4
(Bosnia and Herzegovina) D Džumhur	6^{1}	4
LL	(Portugal) J Faria	7^{7}	6
(Argentina) RA Burruchaga	3	1
(Czech Republic) V Kopřiva	6	6
(Germany) Y Hanfmann	4	7^{7}	4
(Argentina) JM Cerúndolo	6	6^{1}	6

Quarterfinals
8	(Argentina) TM Etcheverry	7^{7}	6
LL	(Portugal) J Faria	6^{4}	4
(Czech Republic) V Kopřiva	6	6
(Argentina) JM Cerúndolo	4	4

Semifinals
8	(Argentina) TM Etcheverry	4	7^{7}	7^{7}
(Czech Republic) V Kopřiva	6	6^{2}	6^{4}

== Qualifying ==
=== Seeds ===
1. (Paraguay) Daniel Vallejo (first round)
2. (Chile) Tomás Barrios Vera (qualifying competition, lucky loser)
3. (Chinese Taipei) Tseng Chun-hsin (first round)
4. (Denmark) Elmer Møller (first round)
5. (Croatia) Dino Prižmić (qualified)
6. (Serbia) Dušan Lajović (qualifying competition, lucky loser)
7. (Lithuania) Vilius Gaubas (qualified)
8. (Chile) Nicolás Jarry (first round)

=== Qualifiers ===
1. (Brazil) Thiago Monteiro
2. (Croatia) Dino Prižmić
3. (Brazil) Igor Marcondes
4. (Lithuania) Vilius Gaubas

=== Lucky losers ===
1. (Chile) Tomás Barrios Vera
2. (Serbia) Dušan Lajović
3. (Italy) Francesco Passaro
4. (Portugal) Jaime Faria

=== Qualifying draw ===
==== First qualifier ====
First round
1	(Paraguay) Daniel Vallejo	4	1
WC	(Brazil) Thiago Monteiro	6	6
(Bolivia) Hugo Dellien	6	6^{3}	1
6	(Serbia) Dušan Lajović	3	7^{7}	6

Qualifying competition
WC	(Brazil) Thiago Monteiro	2	6	6
6	(Serbia) Dušan Lajović	6	3	3

==== Second qualifier ====
First round
2	(Chile) Tomás Barrios Vera	6	7
WC	(Brazil) Pedro Boscardin Dias	4	5
(Colombia) Daniel Elahi Galán	1	2
5	(Croatia) Dino Prižmić	6	6

Qualifying competition
2	(Chile) Tomás Barrios Vera	3	4
5	(Croatia) Dino Prižmić	6	6

==== Third qualifier ====
First round
3	(Chinese Taipei) Tseng Chun-hsin	3	6^{5}
WC	(Brazil) Igor Marcondes	6	7^{7}
(Portugal) Jaime Faria	7^{8}	6^{4}	6
8	(Chile) Nicolás Jarry	6^{6}	7^{7}	3

Qualifying competition
WC	(Brazil) Igor Marcondes	6	7^{7}
(Portugal) Jaime Faria	1	6^{5}

==== Fourth qualifier ====
First round
4	(Denmark) Elmer Møller	6^{4}	3
(Italy) Francesco Passaro	7^{7}	6
(Italy) Andrea Pellegrino	4	5
7	(Lithuania) Vilius Gaubas	6	7

Qualifying competition
(Italy) Francesco Passaro	4	4
7	(Lithuania) Vilius Gaubas	6	6
