= 2018 Rio Open – Singles =

Singles
- 2018 Rio Open

Final
- Champion: (Argentina) Diego Schwartzman
- Runner-up: (Spain) Fernando Verdasco
- Score: 6–2, 6–3

Details
- Draw: 32 (4 Q / 3 WC )
- Seeds: 8

Events
Singles	Doubles
- Rio Open

Dominic Thiem was the defending champion, but lost in the quarterfinals to Fernando Verdasco.

Diego Schwartzman won the title, defeating Verdasco in the final, 6–2, 6–3.

== Seeds ==
1. (Croatia) Marin Čilić (second round)
2. (Austria) Dominic Thiem (quarterfinals)
3. (Spain) Pablo Carreño Busta (second round)
4. (Spain) Albert Ramos Viñolas (second round)
5. (Italy) Fabio Fognini (semifinals)
6. (Argentina) Diego Schwartzman (champion)
7. (Uruguay) Pablo Cuevas (quarterfinals)
8. (Spain) Fernando Verdasco (final)

== Draw ==
Key

- Q = Qualifier
- WC = Wild card
- LL = Lucky loser
- Alt = Alternate
- ITF = ITF entry
- PR = Protected ranking
- SR = Special ranking
- SE = Special exempt
- JE = Junior exempt
- JR = Junior Accelerator Programme entrant
- CO = College Accelerator Programme entrant
- NG = Next Gen Accelerator Program entrant
- w/o = Walkover
- r = Retired
- d = Defaulted

=== Finals ===
Semifinals
6	(Argentina) Diego Schwartzman	7	6
(Chile) Nicolás Jarry	5	2
5	(Italy) Fabio Fognini	1	5
8	(Spain) Fernando Verdasco	6	7

Final
6	(Argentina) Diego Schwartzman	6	6
8	(Spain) Fernando Verdasco	2	3

=== Top half ===
First round
1	(Croatia) M Čilić	6	6
Q	(Argentina) C Berlocq	3	2
(France) G Monfils	7	3	7
(Argentina) H Zeballos	5	6	5
(Czech Republic) J Veselý	2	2^{r}
(Argentina) F Delbonis	6	3
WC	(Norway) C Ruud	1^{r}
6	(Argentina) D Schwartzman	4
4	(Spain) A Ramos Viñolas	6	3	6
(Brazil) R Dutra Silva	3	6	4
(Spain) G García López	3	6^{3}
(Chile) N Jarry	6	7^{7}
LL	(Portugal) G Elias	6	5	7
(Argentina) G Pella	4	7	5
WC	(Brazil) T Monteiro	7^{7}	6^{10}	3
7	(Uruguay) P Cuevas	6^{5}	7^{12}	6

Second round
1	(Croatia) M Čilić	3	6^{8}
(France) G Monfils	6	7^{10}
(Argentina) F Delbonis	2	3
6	(Argentina) D Schwartzman	6	6
4	(Spain) A Ramos Viñolas	5	3
(Chile) N Jarry	7	6
LL	(Portugal) G Elias	5	1
7	(Uruguay) P Cuevas	7	6

Quarterfinals
(France) G Monfils	3	4
6	(Argentina) D Schwartzman	6	6
(Chile) N Jarry	7	6
7	(Uruguay) P Cuevas	5	3

Semifinals
6	(Argentina) D Schwartzman	7	6
(Chile) N Jarry	5	2

=== Bottom half ===
First round
5	(Italy) F Fognini	6^{5}	7	6
WC	(Brazil) T Bellucci	7^{7}	5	2
Q	(Spain) R Carballés Baena	6	1	3^{r}
(United States) T Sandgren	4	6	4
(Slovenia) A Bedene	7	6
PR	(Austria) A Haider-Maurer	5	0
Q	(Italy) M Cecchinato	4	1
3	(Spain) P Carreño Busta	6	6
8	(Spain) F Verdasco	6	3	6
(Argentina) L Mayer	2	6	3
(Dominican Republic) V Estrella Burgos	3	3
(Argentina) N Kicker	6	6
PR	(Spain) P Andújar	7	6
(Austria) G Melzer	5	2
(Serbia) D Lajović	2	5
2	(Austria) D Thiem	6	7

Second round
5	(Italy) F Fognini	4	6	7^{8}
(United States) T Sandgren	6	4	6^{6}
(Slovenia) A Bedene	6	5	6
3	(Spain) P Carreño Busta	2	7	2
8	(Spain) F Verdasco	6^{3}	6	6
(Argentina) N Kicker	7^{7}	2	0
PR	(Spain) P Andújar	2^{r}
2	(Austria) D Thiem	4

Quarterfinals
5	(Italy) F Fognini	6^{3}	6	6
(Slovenia) A Bedene	7^{7}	3	1
8	(Spain) F Verdasco	6	6
2	(Austria) D Thiem	4	0

Semifinals
5	(Italy) F Fognini	1	5
8	(Spain) F Verdasco	6	7

== Qualifying ==
=== Seeds ===
1. (Spain) Roberto Carballés Baena (qualified)
2. (Italy) Marco Cecchinato (qualified)
3. (Portugal) Gastão Elias (qualifying competition, lucky loser)
4. (Argentina) Carlos Berlocq (qualified)
5. (Portugal) Pedro Sousa (first round)
6. (France) Corentin Moutet (qualified)
7. (Austria) Sebastian Ofner (first round)
8. (Italy) Alessandro Giannessi (qualifying competition)

=== Qualifiers ===
1. (Spain) Roberto Carballés Baena
2. (Italy) Marco Cecchinato
3. (France) Corentin Moutet (withdrew due to a right knee injury)
4. (Argentina) Carlos Berlocq

=== Lucky losers ===
1. (Portugal) Gastão Elias

=== Qualifying draw ===
==== First qualifier ====
First round
1	(Spain) Roberto Carballés Baena	4	6	3
(Spain) Carlos Taberner	6	1	0^{r}
(Brazil) Guilherme Clezar	7^{7}	4	3
8	(Italy) Alessandro Giannessi	6^{3}	6	6

Qualifying competition
1	(Spain) Roberto Carballés Baena	6	6
8	(Italy) Alessandro Giannessi	3	2

==== Second qualifier ====
First round
2	(Italy) Marco Cecchinato	6	6
(Portugal) João Domingues	3	2
(Argentina) Renzo Olivo	6	6
5	(Portugal) Pedro Sousa	4	3

Qualifying competition
2	(Italy) Marco Cecchinato	7^{11}	6
(Argentina) Renzo Olivo	6^{9}	2

==== Third qualifier ====
First round
3	(Portugal) Gastão Elias	6	6
WC	(Brazil) José Pereira	4	2
WC	(Brazil) Thiago Seyboth Wild	2	0
6	(France) Corentin Moutet	6	6

Qualifying competition
3	(Portugal) Gastão Elias	2	7^{8}	4
6	(France) Corentin Moutet	6	6^{6}	6

==== Fourth qualifier ====
First round
4	(Argentina) Carlos Berlocq	6	7
WC	(Brazil) João Souza	1	5
(Spain) Tommy Robredo	5	6	6
7	(Austria) Sebastian Ofner	7	2	1

Qualifying competition
4	(Argentina) Carlos Berlocq	6	7^{7}
(Spain) Tommy Robredo	4	6^{3}
