= 2017 Rio Open – Singles =

Singles
- 2017 Rio Open

Final
- Champion: (Austria) Dominic Thiem
- Runner-up: (Spain) Pablo Carreño Busta
- Score: 7–5, 6–4

Details
- Draw: 32 (4 Q / 3 WC )
- Seeds: 8

Events
Singles	Doubles
- Rio Open

Pablo Cuevas was the defending champion, but lost in the first round to Arthur De Greef.

Dominic Thiem won the title, defeating Pablo Carreño Busta in the final, 7–5, 6–4.

== Seeds ==
1. (Japan) Kei Nishikori (first round)
2. (Austria) Dominic Thiem (champion)
3. (Uruguay) Pablo Cuevas (first round)
4. (Spain) Pablo Carreño Busta (final)
5. (Spain) Albert Ramos Viñolas (semifinals)
6. (Spain) David Ferrer (first round)
7. (Italy) Paolo Lorenzi (first round)
8. (Portugal) João Sousa (first round)

== Draw ==
Key

- Q = Qualifier
- WC = Wild card
- LL = Lucky loser
- Alt = Alternate
- ITF = ITF entry
- PR = Protected ranking
- SR = Special ranking
- SE = Special exempt
- JE = Junior exempt
- JR = Junior Accelerator Programme entrant
- CO = College Accelerator Programme entrant
- NG = Next Gen Accelerator Program entrant
- w/o = Walkover
- r = Retired
- d = Defaulted

=== Finals ===
Semifinals
WC	(Norway) Casper Ruud	6	5	0
4	(Spain) Pablo Carreño Busta	2	7	6
5	(Spain) Albert Ramos Viñolas	1	4
2	(Austria) Dominic Thiem	6	6

Final
4	(Spain) Pablo Carreño Busta	5	4
2	(Austria) Dominic Thiem	7	6

=== Top half ===
First round
1	(Japan) K Nishikori	4	3
(Brazil) T Bellucci	6	6
(Brazil) T Monteiro	2	7^{7}	6
(Portugal) G Elias	6	6^{4}	4
WC	(Norway) C Ruud	6	6
(Brazil) R Dutra Silva	3	4
Q	(Spain) R Carballés Baena	6	6
8	(Portugal) J Sousa	3	1
4	(Spain) P Carreño Busta	6	6
WC	(Brazil) J Souza	3	2
(Argentina) G Pella	2	5
LL	(Dominican Republic) V Estrella Burgos	6	7
(Argentina) C Berlocq	2	3
(Argentina) H Zeballos	6	6
(Ukraine) A Dolgopolov	6	6
6	(Spain) D Ferrer	4	4

Second round
(Brazil) T Bellucci	6^{8}	6	3
(Brazil) T Monteiro	7^{10}	3	6
WC	(Norway) C Ruud	6^{4}	6	7^{7}
Q	(Spain) R Carballés Baena	7^{7}	4	6^{3}
4	(Spain) P Carreño Busta	6	4	6
LL	(Dominican Republic) V Estrella Burgos	2	6	2
(Argentina) H Zeballos	6^{4}	6	4
(Ukraine) A Dolgopolov	7^{7}	4	6

Quarterfinals
(Brazil) T Monteiro	2	6^{2}
WC	(Norway) C Ruud	6	7^{7}
4	(Spain) P Carreño Busta	7^{7}	6^{2}	1
(Ukraine) A Dolgopolov	6^{4}	7^{7}	0^{r}

Semifinals
WC	(Norway) C Ruud	6	5	0
4	(Spain) P Carreño Busta	2	7	6

=== Bottom half ===
First round
5	(Spain) A Ramos Viñolas	6	6
(France) S Robert	2	0
PR	(Spain) T Robredo	2	4
(Italy) F Fognini	6	6
Q	(Argentina) N Kicker	7	6
Q	(Italy) M Cecchinato	5	0
Q	(Belgium) A De Greef	6	3	7
3	(Uruguay) P Cuevas	3	6	5
7	(Italy) P Lorenzi	6	1	4
(Argentina) F Delbonis	4	6	6
(Argentina) D Schwartzman	6	3	6
(Argentina) R Olivo	2	6	4
(Argentina) F Bagnis	4	4
(Serbia) D Lajović	6	6
WC	(Serbia) J Tipsarević	4	5
2	(Austria) D Thiem	6	7

Second round
5	(Spain) A Ramos Viñolas	6	6
(Italy) F Fognini	2	3
Q	(Argentina) N Kicker	6	6
Q	(Belgium) A De Greef	3	3
(Argentina) F Delbonis	4	6^{1}
(Argentina) D Schwartzman	6	7^{7}
(Serbia) D Lajović	2	5
2	(Austria) D Thiem	6	7

Quarterfinals
5	(Spain) A Ramos Viñolas	6	6
Q	(Argentina) N Kicker	2	3
(Argentina) D Schwartzman	2	3
2	(Austria) D Thiem	6	6

Semifinals
5	(Spain) A Ramos Viñolas	1	4
2	(Austria) D Thiem	6	6

== Qualifying ==
=== Seeds ===
1. (Dominican Republic) Víctor Estrella Burgos (qualifying competition, lucky loser)
2. (Japan) Taro Daniel (qualifying competition)
3. (Slovakia) Jozef Kovalík (first round, retired)
4. (Argentina) Nicolás Kicker (qualified)
5. (Italy) Alessandro Giannessi (first round)
6. (Spain) Roberto Carballés Baena (qualified)
7. (Belgium) Arthur De Greef (qualified)
8. (Argentina) Guido Andreozzi (qualifying competition, retired)

=== Qualifiers ===
1. (Belgium) Arthur De Greef
2. (Italy) Marco Cecchinato
3. (Spain) Roberto Carballés Baena
4. (Argentina) Nicolás Kicker

=== Lucky losers ===
1. (Dominican Republic) Víctor Estrella Burgos

=== Qualifying draw ===
==== First qualifier ====
First round
1	(Dominican Republic) Víctor Estrella Burgos	6	6
(Spain) Rubén Ramírez Hidalgo	3	3
WC	(Brazil) João Pedro Sorgi	4	3
7	(Belgium) Arthur De Greef	6	6

Qualifying competition
1	(Dominican Republic) Víctor Estrella Burgos	4	4
7	(Belgium) Arthur De Greef	6	6

==== Second qualifier ====
First round
2	(Japan) Taro Daniel	6	0	6
(Italy) Federico Gaio	1	6	1
(Italy) Marco Cecchinato	7^{7}	6^{4}	6
5	(Italy) Alessandro Giannessi	6^{5}	7^{7}	2

Qualifying competition
2	(Japan) Taro Daniel	1	2
(Italy) Marco Cecchinato	6	6

==== Third qualifier ====
First round
3	(Slovakia) Jozef Kovalík	1^{r}
(Brazil) Guilherme Clezar	5
WC	(Brazil) Felipe Meligeni Alves	3	6	0
6	(Spain) Roberto Carballés Baena	6	4	6

Qualifying competition
(Brazil) Guilherme Clezar	6	1	4
6	(Spain) Roberto Carballés Baena	1	6	6

==== Fourth qualifier ====
First round
4	(Argentina) Nicolás Kicker	6	7^{8}
(Chile) Christian Garin	3	6^{6}
WC	(Brazil) Orlando Luz	7	3	4
8	(Argentina) Guido Andreozzi	5	6	6

Qualifying competition
4	(Argentina) Nicolás Kicker	4	6	1
8	(Argentina) Guido Andreozzi	6	4	0^{r}
