= 2023 Rio Open – Doubles =

Doubles
- 2023 Rio Open

Final
- Champions: (Argentina) Máximo González (Argentina) Andrés Molteni
- Runners-up: (Colombia) Juan Sebastián Cabal (Brazil) Marcelo Melo
- Score: 6–1, 7–6^{(7–3)}

Details
- Draw: 16
- Seeds: 4

Events
Singles	Doubles
- Rio Open

Máximo González and Andrés Molteni defeated Juan Sebastián Cabal and Marcelo Melo in the final, 6–1, 7–6^{(7–3)} to win the doubles tennis title at the 2023 Rio Open.

Simone Bolelli and Fabio Fognini were the defending champions, but lost in the first round to Sadio Doumbia and Fabien Reboul.

== Seeds ==
1. (Brazil) Rafael Matos / (Spain) David Vega Hernández (first round)
2. (Colombia) Juan Sebastián Cabal / (Brazil) Marcelo Melo (final)
3. (Italy) Simone Bolelli / (Italy) Fabio Fognini (first round)
4. (Portugal) Francisco Cabral / (Argentina) Horacio Zeballos (semifinals)

== Draw ==
Key

- Q = Qualifier
- WC = Wild card
- LL = Lucky loser
- Alt = Alternate
- ITF = ITF entry
- PR = Protected ranking
- SR = Special ranking
- SE = Special exempt
- JE = Junior exempt
- JR = Junior Accelerator Programme entrant
- CO = College Accelerator Programme entrant
- NG = Next Gen Accelerator Program entrant
- w/o = Walkover
- r = Retired
- d = Defaulted

=== Draw ===
First round
1	(Brazil) R Matos (Spain) D Vega Hernández	6^{8}	6	[9]
Q	(Serbia) N Ćaćić (Italy) A Pellegrino	7^{10}	4	[11]
LL	(Brazil) M Alves (Brazil) J Fonseca	5	6^{4}
(Argentina) M González (Argentina) A Molteni	7	7^{7}
4	(Portugal) F Cabral (Argentina) H Zeballos	6	6
PR	(Spain) P Martínez (Austria) D Thiem	3	4
(Bosnia and Herzegovina) T Brkić (Ecuador) G Escobar	1	7	[13]
WC	(Brazil) M Demoliner (Brazil) F Meligeni Alves	6	5	[11]
(Argentina) S Báez (Spain) A Ramos Viñolas	5	6	[6]
(United States) N Lammons (United States) J Withrow	7	4	[10]
(France) S Doumbia (France) F Reboul	6	4	[11]
3	(Italy) S Bolelli (Italy) F Fognini	3	6	[9]
(Argentina) P Cachin (Argentina) F Cerúndolo	2	4
(Argentina) TM Etcheverry (Argentina) D Schwartzman	6	6
(Austria) A Erler (Austria) L Miedler	4	6	[7]
2	(Colombia) JS Cabal (Brazil) M Melo	6	3	[10]

Quarterfinals
Q	(Serbia) N Ćaćić (Italy) A Pellegrino	7	6^{7}	[3]
(Argentina) M González (Argentina) A Molteni	5	7^{9}	[10]
4	(Portugal) F Cabral (Argentina) H Zeballos	6	7^{7}
(Bosnia and Herzegovina) T Brkić (Ecuador) G Escobar	4	6^{4}
(United States) N Lammons (United States) J Withrow	5	4
(France) S Doumbia (France) F Reboul	7	6
(Argentina) TM Etcheverry (Argentina) D Schwartzman	1	2
2	(Colombia) JS Cabal (Brazil) M Melo	6	6

Semifinals
(Argentina) M González (Argentina) A Molteni	6	6
4	(Portugal) F Cabral (Argentina) H Zeballos	3	4
(France) S Doumbia (France) F Reboul	4	4
2	(Colombia) JS Cabal (Brazil) M Melo	6	6

Final
(Argentina) M González (Argentina) A Molteni	6	7^{7}
2	(Colombia) JS Cabal (Brazil) M Melo	1	6^{3}

== Qualifying ==
=== Seeds ===
1. (Kazakhstan) Andrey Golubev / (Kazakhstan) Aleksandr Nedovyesov (first round)
2. (Serbia) Nikola Ćaćić / (Italy) Andrea Pellegrino (qualified)

=== Qualifiers ===
1. (Serbia) Nikola Ćaćić / (Italy) Andrea Pellegrino

=== Lucky losers ===
1. (Brazil) Mateus Alves / (Brazil) João Fonseca

=== Qualifying draw ===
First round
1	(Kazakhstan) Andrey Golubev (Kazakhstan) Aleksandr Nedovyesov	6^{3}	2
WC	(Brazil) Mateus Alves (Brazil) João Fonseca	7^{7}	6
PR	(Brazil) Matheus Pucinelli de Almeida (Brazil) Pedro Sakamoto	6^{4}	3
2	(Serbia) Nikola Ćaćić (Italy) Andrea Pellegrino	7^{7}	6

Qualifying competition
WC	(Brazil) Mateus Alves (Brazil) João Fonseca	4	2
2	(Serbia) Nikola Ćaćić (Italy) Andrea Pellegrino	6	6
