= 2023 Rio Open – Singles =

Singles
- 2023 Rio Open

Final
- Champion: (United Kingdom) Cameron Norrie
- Runner-up: (Spain) Carlos Alcaraz
- Score: 5–7, 6–4, 7–5

Details
- Draw: 32 (4 Q / 3 WC )
- Seeds: 8

Events
Singles	Doubles
- Rio Open

Cameron Norrie defeated the defending champion Carlos Alcaraz in the final, 5–7, 6–4, 7–5 to win the singles tennis title at the 2023 Rio Open. It was their second final meeting in as many weeks, with Alcaraz winning the title in Buenos Aires the week prior.

This tournament marked the retirement of former top 25 player Thomaz Bellucci. He lost in the first round to Sebastián Báez.

== Seeds ==
1. (Spain) Carlos Alcaraz (final)
2. (United Kingdom) Cameron Norrie (champion)
3. (Italy) Lorenzo Musetti (first round)
4. (Argentina) Francisco Cerúndolo (second round)
5. (Argentina) Diego Schwartzman (first round)
6. (Argentina) Sebastián Báez (quarterfinals)
7. (Spain) Albert Ramos Viñolas (quarterfinals)
8. (Argentina) Federico Coria (withdrew)
9. (Slovakia) Alex Molčan (second round)

== Draw ==
Key

- Q = Qualifier
- WC = Wild card
- LL = Lucky loser
- Alt = Alternate
- ITF = ITF entry
- PR = Protected ranking
- SR = Special ranking
- SE = Special exempt
- JE = Junior exempt
- JR = Junior Accelerator Programme entrant
- CO = College Accelerator Programme entrant
- NG = Next Gen Accelerator Program entrant
- w/o = Walkover
- r = Retired
- d = Defaulted

=== Finals ===
Semifinals
1	(Spain) Carlos Alcaraz	6^{2}	7	6
Q	(Chile) Nicolás Jarry	7^{7}	5	0
(Spain) Bernabé Zapata Miralles	2	6	6^{3}
2	(United Kingdom) Cameron Norrie	6	3	7^{7}

Final
1	(Spain) Carlos Alcaraz	7	4	5
2	(United Kingdom) Cameron Norrie	5	6	7

=== Top half ===
First round
1	(Spain) C Alcaraz	6	6
WC	(Brazil) M Alves	4	4
(Italy) F Fognini	6	6
Q	(Chile) T Barrios Vera	2	3
(Serbia) L Đere	6	3
Q	(Argentina) F Bagnis	2	2^{r}
(Serbia) D Lajović	6	6
5	(Argentina) D Schwartzman	1	4
3	(Italy) L Musetti	4	1
Q	(Chile) N Jarry	6	6
(Spain) P Martínez	7^{7}	6
(Chile) C Garín	6^{0}	4
Q	(France) H Gaston	5	4
SE	(Peru) JP Varillas	7	6
WC	(Brazil) T Bellucci	3	2
6	(Argentina) S Báez	6	6

Second round
1	(Spain) C Alcaraz	6^{5}	6	6
(Italy) F Fognini	7^{7}	2	4
(Serbia) L Đere	2	4
(Serbia) D Lajović	6	6
Q	(Chile) N Jarry	6	6
(Spain) P Martínez	2	2
SE	(Peru) JP Varillas	5	6^{6}
6	(Argentina) S Báez	7	7^{8}

Quarterfinals
1	(Spain) C Alcaraz	6	7^{7}
(Serbia) D Lajović	4	6^{0}
Q	(Chile) N Jarry	6	7^{7}
6	(Argentina) S Báez	3	6^{3}

Semifinals
1	(Spain) C Alcaraz	6^{2}	7	6
Q	(Chile) N Jarry	7^{7}	5	0

=== Bottom half ===
First round
7	(Spain) A Ramos Viñolas	5	6	6
(Argentina) TM Etcheverry	7	4	4
(Argentina) P Cachin	6^{4}	4
(Colombia) DE Galán	7^{7}	6
(Spain) J Munar	3	5
(Spain) B Zapata Miralles	6	7
(Spain) R Carballés Baena	6	3	3
4	(Argentina) F Cerúndolo	4	6	6
9	(Slovakia) A Molčan	6	6
WC	(Brazil) J Fonseca	0	3
(Portugal) J Sousa	0	2
PR	(Bolivia) H Dellien	6	6
PR	(Austria) D Thiem	1	6	6^{2}
(Brazil) T Monteiro	6	3	7^{7}
LL	(Argentina) JM Cerúndolo	5	1
2	(United Kingdom) C Norrie	7	6

Second round
7	(Spain) A Ramos Viñolas	6	6
(Colombia) DE Galán	2	4
(Spain) B Zapata Miralles	6	4	6
4	(Argentina) F Cerúndolo	1	6	1
9	(Slovakia) A Molčan	6	2	2
PR	(Bolivia) H Dellien	1	6	6
(Brazil) T Monteiro	5	5
2	(United Kingdom) C Norrie	7	7

Quarterfinals
7	(Spain) A Ramos Viñolas	4	6	4
(Spain) B Zapata Miralles	6	2	6
PR	(Bolivia) H Dellien	6	1	4
2	(United Kingdom) C Norrie	4	6	6

Semifinals
(Spain) B Zapata Miralles	2	6	6^{3}
2	(United Kingdom) C Norrie	6	3	7^{7}

== Qualifying ==
=== Seeds ===
1. (Argentina) Facundo Bagnis (qualified)
2. (Italy) Marco Cecchinato (first round)
3. (France) Hugo Gaston (qualified)
4. (Argentina) Juan Manuel Cerúndolo (qualifying competition, lucky loser)
5. (Kazakhstan) Timofey Skatov (first round)
6. (Argentina) Camilo Ugo Carabelli (first round)
7. (Slovakia) Jozef Kovalík (first round)
8. (Germany) Yannick Hanfmann (qualifying competition)

=== Qualifiers ===
1. (Argentina) Facundo Bagnis
2. (Chile) Tomás Barrios Vera
3. (France) Hugo Gaston
4. (Chile) Nicolás Jarry

=== Lucky loser ===
1. (Argentina) Juan Manuel Cerúndolo

=== Qualifying draw ===
==== First qualifier ====
First round
1	(Argentina) Facundo Bagnis	4	6	6
WC	(Brazil) João Lucas Reis da Silva	6	3	2
(Argentina) Federico Delbonis	6^{8}	2
8	(Germany) Yannick Hanfmann	7^{10}	6

Qualifying competition
1	(Argentina) Facundo Bagnis	7^{8}	6
8	(Germany) Yannick Hanfmann	6^{6}	3

==== Second qualifier ====
First round
2	(Italy) Marco Cecchinato	4	2
Alt	(Chile) Alejandro Tabilo	6	6
PR	(Chile) Tomás Barrios Vera	6	6
7	(Slovakia) Jozef Kovalík	4	4

Qualifying competition
Alt	(Chile) Alejandro Tabilo	4	4
PR	(Chile) Tomás Barrios Vera	6	6

==== Third qualifier ====
First round
3	(France) Hugo Gaston	7	7^{7}
(Brazil) Felipe Meligeni Alves	5	6^{4}
WC	(Brazil) Eduardo Ribeiro	6	2	6
5	(Kazakhstan) Timofey Skatov	2	6	4

Qualifying competition
3	(France) Hugo Gaston	6	7^{7}
WC	(Brazil) Eduardo Ribeiro	2	6^{4}

==== Fourth qualifier ====
First round
4	(Argentina) Juan Manuel Cerúndolo	6	6
WC	(Brazil) Matheus Pucinelli de Almeida	2	3
(Chile) Nicolás Jarry	6	6
6	(Argentina) Camilo Ugo Carabelli	1	2

Qualifying competition
4	(Argentina) Juan Manuel Cerúndolo	2	3
(Chile) Nicolás Jarry	6	6
