= 2016 Rio Open – Men's singles =

Men's singles
- 2016 Rio Open

Final
- Champion: (Uruguay) Pablo Cuevas
- Runner-up: (Argentina) Guido Pella
- Score: 6–4, 6–7^{(5–7)}, 6–4

Details
- Draw: 32 (4 Q / 3 WC )
- Seeds: 8

Events
Singles	men	women
Doubles	men	women
- Rio Open

David Ferrer was the defending champion, but lost in the quarterfinals to Dominic Thiem.

Pablo Cuevas won the title, defeating Guido Pella in the final, 6–4, 6–7^{(5–7)}, 6–4.

== Seeds ==
1. (Spain) Rafael Nadal (semifinals)
2. (Spain) David Ferrer (quarterfinals)
3. (France) Jo-Wilfried Tsonga (first round)
4. (United States) John Isner (first round)
5. (Austria) Dominic Thiem (semifinals)
6. (United States) Jack Sock (first round)
7. (Italy) Fabio Fognini (second round , retired)
8. (Brazil) Thomaz Bellucci (first round)

== Draw ==
Key

- Q = Qualifier
- WC = Wild card
- LL = Lucky loser
- Alt = Alternate
- ITF = ITF entry
- PR = Protected ranking
- SR = Special ranking
- SE = Special exempt
- JE = Junior exempt
- JR = Junior Accelerator Programme entrant
- CO = College Accelerator Programme entrant
- NG = Next Gen Accelerator Program entrant
- w/o = Walkover
- r = Retired
- d = Defaulted

=== Finals ===
Semifinals
1	(Spain) Rafael Nadal	7^{8}	6^{3}	4
(Uruguay) Pablo Cuevas	6^{6}	7^{7}	6
(Argentina) Guido Pella	6	6
5	(Austria) Dominic Thiem	1	4

Final
(Uruguay) Pablo Cuevas	6	6^{5}	6
(Argentina) Guido Pella	4	7^{7}	4

=== Top half ===
First round
1	(Spain) R Nadal	6	6
(Spain) P Carreño Busta	1	4
(Spain) N Almagro	6	3	6
(Spain) D Muñoz de la Nava	1	6	4
Q	(Japan) T Daniel	6	5	2
(Spain) I Cervantes	3	7	6
(Ukraine) A Dolgopolov	6^{3}	7	6
8	(Brazil) T Bellucci	7^{7}	5	2
3	(France) J-W Tsonga	3	6	4
WC	(Brazil) T Monteiro	6	3	6
(Uruguay) P Cuevas	6	6
Q	(Argentina) F Bagnis	2	0
(Italy) M Cecchinato	4	6	1
(Italy) P Lorenzi	6	3	6
(Argentina) F Delbonis	7	6
6	(United States) J Sock	5	1

Second round
1	(Spain) R Nadal	6	7
(Spain) N Almagro	3	5
(Spain) I Cervantes	6	0	3
(Ukraine) A Dolgopolov	3	6	6
WC	(Brazil) T Monteiro	6^{5}	3
(Uruguay) P Cuevas	7^{7}	6
(Italy) P Lorenzi	3	0
(Argentina) F Delbonis	6	6

Quarterfinals
1	(Spain) R Nadal	w/o
(Ukraine) A Dolgopolov
(Uruguay) P Cuevas	6	7^{7}
(Argentina) F Delbonis	4	6^{4}

Semifinals
1	(Spain) R Nadal	7^{8}	6^{3}	4
(Uruguay) P Cuevas	6^{6}	7^{7}	6

=== Bottom half ===
First round
7	(Italy) F Fognini	7	6
(United Kingdom) A Bedene	5	3
Q	(Spain) D Gimeno-Traver	5
(Argentina) J Mónaco	2^{r}
(Colombia) S Giraldo	6	7
Q	(Portugal) G Elias	4	6^{5}
(Argentina) G Pella	7^{7}	5	7^{10}
4	(United States) J Isner	6^{5}	7	6^{8}
5	(Austria) D Thiem	6	6
(Spain) P Andújar	3	4
(Argentina) D Schwartzman	6	6
WC	(Brazil) J Souza	3	2
(Serbia) D Lajović	4^{r}
(Spain) A Ramos	3
WC	(Chile) N Jarry	3	6^{3}
2	(Spain) D Ferrer	6	7^{7}

Second round
7	(Italy) F Fognini	6	1^{r}
Q	(Spain) D Gimeno-Traver	4	3
(Colombia) S Giraldo	4	0
(Argentina) G Pella	6	6
5	(Austria) D Thiem	7	7
(Argentina) D Schwartzman	5	5
(Spain) A Ramos	6	1	4
2	(Spain) D Ferrer	4	6	6

Quarterfinals
Q	(Spain) D Gimeno-Traver	7	1	5
(Argentina) G Pella	5	6	7
5	(Austria) D Thiem	6	6
2	(Spain) D Ferrer	3	2

Semifinals
(Argentina) G Pella	6	6
5	(Austria) D Thiem	1	4

== Qualifying ==
=== Seeds ===
1. (France) Paul-Henri Mathieu (qualifying competition , retired)
2. (Japan) Taro Daniel (qualified)
3. (Argentina) Facundo Bagnis (qualified)
4. (Brazil) Rogério Dutra Silva (qualifying competition)
5. (Spain) Daniel Gimeno-Traver (qualified)
6. (Spain) Albert Montañés (qualifying competition , retired)
7. (Argentina) Facundo Argüello (qualifying competition)
8. (Portugal) Gastão Elias (qualified)

=== Qualifiers ===
1. (Spain) Daniel Gimeno-Traver
2. (Japan) Taro Daniel
3. (Argentina) Facundo Bagnis
4. (Portugal) Gastão Elias

=== Qualifying draw ===
==== First qualifier ====
First round
1	(France) Paul-Henri Mathieu	6	6
Alt	(Brazil) André Ghem	3	4
Alt	(Brazil) Guilherme Clezar	3	2
5	(Spain) Daniel Gimeno-Traver	6	6

Qualifying competition
1	(France) Paul-Henri Mathieu	4	2^{r}
5	(Spain) Daniel Gimeno-Traver	6	2

==== Second qualifier ====
First round
2	(Japan) Taro Daniel	6	6
WC	(Brazil) Orlando Luz	4	4
(Slovenia) Blaž Rola	6	2	1
7	(Argentina) Facundo Argüello	3	6	6

Qualifying competition
2	(Japan) Taro Daniel	3	6	6
7	(Argentina) Facundo Argüello	6	2	3

==== Third qualifier ====
First round
3	(Argentina) Facundo Bagnis	6	2	6
(Argentina) Máximo González	3	6	4
WC	(Brazil) José Pereira	7^{7}	4	0
6	(Spain) Albert Montañés	6^{3}	6	6

Qualifying competition
3	(Argentina) Facundo Bagnis	6	5
6	(Spain) Albert Montañés	4	2^{r}

==== Fourth qualifier ====
First round
4	(Brazil) Rogério Dutra Silva	6	6
Alt	(Chile) Hans Podlipnik-Castillo	2	2
WC	(Brazil) Carlos Eduardo Severino	3	2
8	(Portugal) Gastão Elias	6	6

Qualifying competition
4	(Brazil) Rogério Dutra Silva	6	5	2
8	(Portugal) Gastão Elias	1	7	6
