= 2019 Rio Open – Singles =

Men's tennis tournament event

Singles
- 2019 Rio Open

Final
- Champion: (Serbia) Laslo Đere
- Runner-up: (Canada) Félix Auger-Aliassime
- Score: 6–3, 7–5

Details
- Draw: 32 (4 Q / 3 WC )
- Seeds: 8

Events
Singles	Doubles
- Rio Open

Laslo Đere won the title – the first of his career – defeating Félix Auger-Aliassime in the final, 6–3, 7–5. No seeded players reached the quarterfinals, and only one seed (João Sousa) won his first-round match.

Diego Schwartzman was the defending champion, but he retired in the first round against Pablo Cuevas.

== Seeds ==
1. (Austria) Dominic Thiem (first round)
2. (Italy) Fabio Fognini (first round)
3. (Italy) Marco Cecchinato (first round)
4. (Argentina) Diego Schwartzman (first round, retired)
5. (Portugal) João Sousa (second round)
6. (Serbia) Dušan Lajović (first round)
7. (Tunisia) Malek Jaziri (first round)
8. (Chile) Nicolás Jarry (first round)

== Draw ==
Key

- Q = Qualifier
- WC = Wild card
- LL = Lucky loser
- Alt = Alternate
- ITF = ITF entry
- PR = Protected ranking
- SR = Special ranking
- SE = Special exempt
- JE = Junior exempt
- JR = Junior Accelerator Programme entrant
- CO = College Accelerator Programme entrant
- NG = Next Gen Accelerator Program entrant
- w/o = Walkover
- r = Retired
- d = Defaulted

=== Finals ===
Semifinals
(Serbia) Laslo Đere	w/o
(Slovenia) Aljaž Bedene
(Uruguay) Pablo Cuevas	3	6	3
WC	(Canada) Félix Auger-Aliassime	6	3	6

Final
(Serbia) Laslo Đere	6	7
WC	(Canada) Félix Auger-Aliassime	3	5

=== Top half ===
First round
1	(Austria) D Thiem	3	3
(Serbia) L Đere	6	6
WC	(Brazil) T Seyboth Wild	6	3	2
(Japan) T Daniel	3	6	6
Q	(Norway) C Ruud	6	6
LL	(Argentina) C Berlocq	1	2
(Argentina) G Pella	4	6	4
5	(Portugal) J Sousa	6	3	6
3	(Italy) M Cecchinato	5	6^{1}
(Slovenia) A Bedene	7	7^{7}
(Portugal) P Sousa	3	2
WC	(Brazil) T Monteiro	6	6
(Argentina) G Andreozzi	4	4
Q	(Bolivia) H Dellien	6	6
(Spain) R Carballés Baena	6	6^{5}	7^{8}
8	(Chile) N Jarry	3	7^{7}	6^{6}

Second round
(Serbia) L Đere	6	6
(Japan) T Daniel	4	2
Q	(Norway) C Ruud	6	3	6
5	(Portugal) J Sousa	3	6	4
(Slovenia) A Bedene	6	6
WC	(Brazil) T Monteiro	3	4
Q	(Bolivia) H Dellien	7	6
(Spain) R Carballés Baena	5	4

Quarterfinals
(Serbia) L Đere	6	7
Q	(Norway) C Ruud	4	5
(Slovenia) A Bedene	4	6	6
Q	(Bolivia) H Dellien	6	2	3

Semifinals
(Serbia) L Đere	w/o
(Slovenia) A Bedene

=== Bottom half ===
First round
7	(Tunisia) M Jaziri	3	5
(Argentina) F Delbonis	6	7
(Italy) L Sonego	6^{7}	3
(Spain) A Ramos Viñolas	7^{9}	6
Q	(Sweden) E Ymer	6	5	2
Q	(Argentina) JI Londero	2	7	6
(Uruguay) P Cuevas	6	4
4	(Argentina) D Schwartzman	1	1^{r}
6	(Serbia) D Lajović	2	1
(United Kingdom) C Norrie	6	6
(Spain) J Munar	7^{7}	6
(Argentina) L Mayer	6^{5}	4
(Chile) C Garín	7	6
(Germany) M Marterer	5	3
WC	(Canada) F Auger-Aliassime	6	6
2	(Italy) F Fognini	2	3

Second round
(Argentina) F Delbonis	6	5	3
(Spain) A Ramos Viñolas	3	7	6
Q	(Argentina) JI Londero	1	4
(Uruguay) P Cuevas	6	6
(United Kingdom) C Norrie	6^{6}	7	6^{4}
(Spain) J Munar	7^{8}	5	7^{7}
(Chile) C Garín	5	4
WC	(Canada) F Auger-Aliassime	7	6

Quarterfinals
(Spain) A Ramos Viñolas	3	6	3
(Uruguay) P Cuevas	6	3	6
(Spain) J Munar	4	3
WC	(Canada) F Auger-Aliassime	6	6

Semifinals
(Uruguay) P Cuevas	3	6	3
WC	(Canada) F Auger-Aliassime	6	3	6

== Qualifying ==
=== Seeds ===
1. (Argentina) Juan Ignacio Londero (qualified)
2. (Italy) Lorenzo Sonego (moved to main draw)
3. (Bolivia) Hugo Dellien (qualified)
4. (Sweden) Elias Ymer (qualified)
5. (Norway) Casper Ruud (qualified)
6. (Argentina) Carlos Berlocq (qualifying competition, lucky loser)
7. (Brazil) Rogério Dutra Silva (qualifying competition)
8. (Spain) Pedro Martínez (qualifying competition)

=== Qualifiers ===
1. (Argentina) Juan Ignacio Londero
2. (Norway) Casper Ruud
3. (Bolivia) Hugo Dellien
4. (Sweden) Elias Ymer

=== Lucky loser ===
1. (Argentina) Carlos Berlocq

=== Qualifying draw ===
==== First qualifier ====
First round
1	(Argentina) Juan Ignacio Londero	7^{7}	6
(Italy) Alessandro Giannessi	6^{3}	1
(Italy) Matteo Donati	2	6	1
7	(Brazil) Rogério Dutra Silva	6	3	6

Qualifying competition
1	(Argentina) Juan Ignacio Londero	7^{7}	6
7	(Brazil) Rogério Dutra Silva	6^{5}	2

==== Second qualifier ====
First round
Alt	(Argentina) Facundo Bagnis	6	7
(Belgium) Kimmer Coppejans	4	5
(Brazil) Thomaz Bellucci	6^{3}	6^{6}
5	(Norway) Casper Ruud	7^{7}	7^{8}

Qualifying competition
Alt	(Argentina) Facundo Bagnis	5	4
5	(Norway) Casper Ruud	7	6

==== Third qualifier ====
First round
3	(Bolivia) Hugo Dellien	6	1	6
WC	(Brazil) Rafael Matos	4	6	0
WC	(Brazil) Natan Rodrigues	3	1
6	(Argentina) Carlos Berlocq	6	6

Qualifying competition
3	(Bolivia) Hugo Dellien	6	7^{7}
6	(Argentina) Carlos Berlocq	3	6^{2}

==== Fourth qualifier ====
First round
4	(Sweden) Elias Ymer	3	7	6
(Portugal) João Domingues	6	5	3
WC	(Brazil) Mateus Alves	4	6	5
8	(Spain) Pedro Martínez	6	3	7

Qualifying competition
4	(Sweden) Elias Ymer	6	1	6
8	(Spain) Pedro Martínez	4	6	4
