= 2025 Rio Open – Singles =

Singles
- 2025 Rio Open

Final
- Champion: (Argentina) Sebastián Báez
- Runner-up: (France) Alexandre Müller
- Score: 6–2, 6–3

Details
- Draw: 32 (4 Q / 3 WC )
- Seeds: 8

Events
Singles	Doubles
- Rio Open

Defending champion Sebastián Báez defeated Alexandre Müller in the final, 6–2, 6–3 to win the singles tennis title at the 2025 Rio Open. It was his seventh ATP Tour title. Báez was the first player to successfully defend the title and first to win multiple titles since the tournament's inception in 2014.

The quarterfinal match between Camilo Ugo Carabelli and Jaime Faria marked the second all-lucky loser quarterfinal in ATP Tour history (since 1990), after Max Purcell and Andreas Seppi at the 2021 Eastbourne International.

== Seeds ==
1. (Germany) Alexander Zverev (quarterfinals)
2. (Italy) Lorenzo Musetti (withdrew)
3. (Chile) Alejandro Tabilo (first round)
4. (Argentina) Francisco Cerúndolo (quarterfinals)
5. (Argentina) Sebastián Báez (champion)
6. (Chile) Nicolás Jarry (second round)
7. (Spain) Pedro Martínez (first round)
8. (Argentina) Tomás Martín Etcheverry (second round)

== Draw ==
Key

- Q = Qualifier
- WC = Wild card
- LL = Lucky loser
- Alt = Alternate
- ITF = ITF entry
- PR = Protected ranking
- SR = Special ranking
- SE = Special exempt
- JE = Junior exempt
- JR = Junior Accelerator Programme entrant
- CO = College Accelerator Programme entrant
- NG = Next Gen Accelerator Program entrant
- w/o = Walkover
- r = Retired
- d = Defaulted

=== Finals ===
Semifinals
(Argentina) Francisco Comesaña	5	7^{7}	3
(France) Alexandre Müller	7	6^{3}	6
5	(Argentina) Sebastián Báez	3	6	6
LL	(Argentina) Camilo Ugo Carabelli	6	1	1

Final
(France) Alexandre Müller	2	3
5	(Argentina) Sebastián Báez	6	6

=== Top half ===
First round
1	(Germany) A Zverev	7^{7}	6
(China) Y Bu	6^{4}	4
(Kazakhstan) A Shevchenko	6	6
WC	(Brazil) F Meligeni Alves	4	2
WC	(Brazil) G Heide	6^{2}	7^{9}	3
(Argentina) F Comesaña	7^{7}	6^{7}	6
Q	(Argentina) JM Cerúndolo	6	3	4
6	(Chile) N Jarry	4	6	6
4	(Argentina) F Cerúndolo	7^{11}	6
(France) H Gaston	6^{9}	0
(Italy) L Darderi	7^{7}	2
Q	(Bolivia) H Dellien	6^{2}	2^{r}
SE	(Brazil) J Fonseca	1	6^{4}
(France) A Müller	6	7^{7}
(France) C Moutet	3	6^{1}
8	(Argentina) TM Etcheverry	6	7^{7}

Second round
1	(Germany) A Zverev	7^{7}	7^{8}
(Kazakhstan) A Shevchenko	6^{1}	6^{6}
(Argentina) F Comesaña	7^{7}	6^{1}	7^{8}
6	(Chile) N Jarry	6^{4}	7^{7}	6^{6}
4	(Argentina) F Cerúndolo	6^{1}	6	6
(Italy) L Darderi	7^{7}	3	2
(France) A Müller	7	7^{7}
8	(Argentina) TM Etcheverry	5	6^{5}

Quarterfinals
1	(Germany) A Zverev	6	3	4
(Argentina) F Comesaña	4	6	6
4	(Argentina) F Cerúndolo	5	1
(France) A Müller	7	6

Semifinals
(Argentina) F Comesaña	5	7^{7}	3
(France) A Müller	7	6^{3}	6

=== Bottom half ===
First round
5	(Argentina) S Báez	6	7
LL	(Argentina) RA Burruchaga	3	5
(Argentina) M Navone	6	6
(Spain) R Carballés Baena	4	3
(Argentina) F Díaz Acosta	6	3	6^{3}
WC	(Brazil) T Monteiro	3	6	7^{7}
Q	(Chinese Taipei) C-h Tseng	6	7
3	(Chile) A Tabilo	2	5
7	(Spain) P Martínez	6	3	3
LL	(Argentina) C Ugo Carabelli	4	6	6
(Serbia) D Lajović	3	4
(Bosnia and Herzegovina) D Džumhur	6	6
(Spain) J Munar	6	3	6
(Brazil) T Seyboth Wild	4	6	0
Q	(Chile) T Barrios Vera	2	5
LL	(Portugal) J Faria	6	7

Second round
5	(Argentina) S Báez	6	1	6
(Argentina) M Navone	4	6	3
WC	(Brazil) T Monteiro	7^{7}	3	6^{4}
Q	(Chinese Taipei) C-h Tseng	6^{4}	6	7^{7}
LL	(Argentina) C Ugo Carabelli	6	6
(Bosnia and Herzegovina) D Džumhur	4	4
(Spain) J Munar	4	6	3
LL	(Portugal) J Faria	6	2	6

Quarterfinals
5	(Argentina) S Báez	6	6
Q	(Chinese Taipei) C-h Tseng	4	1
LL	(Argentina) C Ugo Carabelli	7^{7}	6
LL	(Portugal) J Faria	6^{5}	4

Semifinals
5	(Argentina) S Báez	3	6	6
LL	(Argentina) C Ugo Carabelli	6	1	1

== Qualifying ==
=== Seeds ===
1. (Argentina) Camilo Ugo Carabelli (qualifying competition, lucky loser)
2. (Germany) Yannick Hanfmann (first round)
3. (Portugal) Jaime Faria (qualifying competition, lucky loser)
4. (Bolivia) Hugo Dellien (qualified)
5. (Argentina) Federico Coria (first round)
6. (Chinese Taipei) Tseng Chun-hsin (qualified)
7. (Argentina) Thiago Agustín Tirante (first round)
8. (Chile) Cristian Garín (first round)

=== Qualifiers ===
1. (Chile) Tomás Barrios Vera
2. (Chinese Taipei) Tseng Chun-hsin
3. (Argentina) Juan Manuel Cerúndolo
4. (Bolivia) Hugo Dellien

=== Lucky losers ===
1. (Argentina) Camilo Ugo Carabelli
2. (Portugal) Jaime Faria
3. (Argentina) Román Andrés Burruchaga

=== Qualifying draw ===
==== First qualifier ====
First round
1	(Argentina) Camilo Ugo Carabelli	6	4	6
WC	(Brazil) Karue Sell	4	6	4
(Chile) Tomás Barrios Vera	6	6
8	(Chile) Cristian Garín	4	3

Qualifying competition
1	(Argentina) Camilo Ugo Carabelli	7	2	6^{12}
(Chile) Tomás Barrios Vera	5	6	7^{14}

==== Second qualifier ====
First round
2	(Germany) Yannick Hanfmann	4	3
(Argentina) Marco Trungelliti	6	6
WC	(Brazil) João Lucas Reis da Silva	7^{7}	3	4
6	(Chinese Taipei) Tseng Chun-hsin	6^{0}	6	6

Qualifying competition
(Argentina) Marco Trungelliti	7^{7}	0	4
6	(Chinese Taipei) Tseng Chun-hsin	6^{5}	6	6

==== Third qualifier ====
First round
3	(Portugal) Jaime Faria	7	7^{7}
WC	(Brazil) Mateus Alves	5	6^{4}
(Argentina) Juan Manuel Cerúndolo	6	6
7	(Argentina) Thiago Agustín Tirante	1	4

Qualifying competition
3	(Portugal) Jaime Faria	7	4	4
(Argentina) Juan Manuel Cerúndolo	5	6	6

==== Fourth qualifier ====
First round
4	(Bolivia) Hugo Dellien	6	6
Alt	(Argentina) Juan Pablo Ficovich	4	0
(Argentina) Román Andrés Burruchaga	2	6	6
5	(Argentina) Federico Coria	6	1	4

Qualifying competition
4	(Bolivia) Hugo Dellien	6	1	6
(Argentina) Román Andrés Burruchaga	3	6	1
