= Rio de Janeiro International =

Tennis tournament in Brazil

Defunct tennis tournament
- Tour: ILTF World Circuit
- Founded: 1947
- Abolished: 1967
- Location: Rio de Janeiro, Brazil
- Venue: Rio de Janeiro Country Club
- Surface: Clay / outdoor

The Rio de Janeiro International was a combined clay court tennis competition founded in 1947. Also known as the Internacional do Rio de Janeiro, it was played annually at the Rio de Janeiro Country Club, Rio de Janeiro, Brazil until 1967. The event was part of the ILTF South American Circuit.

== History ==
In 1913 the Rio de Janeiro Country Club was founded. In 1947 it established a clay court event called the Torneio Internacional do Rio de Janeiro or Rio de Janeiro International. This tournament ran annually until 1967 when it was discontinued with the advent of the Open Era in 1968.

In 1989 a new successor international men-only tennis tournament was revived called the Rio de Janeiro Open, however this was played in indoor carpet courts until 1990 then it too ended.

In 2014 a combined tennis tournament returned once more to Rio de Janeiro when the new Rio Open this time a clay court event, was first staged at the Jockey Club Brasileiro. It remained a combined ATP and WTA tournament until 2016 when the women's event was ended, this men's event still continues as of 2024.

In 2017 international tennis returned to the Rio de Janeiro Country Club with the staging of the Rio Tennis Classic an ATP Challenger Tour clay court tournament that lasted one season only due a lack of sponsors.

In 2021 it was revived as a hard court tournament at a new venue the Olympic Tennis Centre, Rio de Janeiro.

== Finals ==
=== Men's Singles ===
(incomplete roll)

Year	Winners	Runners-up	Score
1947	(Ecuador) Pancho Segura	(United States) Frank Parker	6–3, 0–6, 7–5, 6–2,
1949	(Ecuador) Pancho Segura (2)	(Brazil) Manoel Fernandes	8-6, 6-3, 7-5
1950	(Brazil) Bob Falkenburg	(Brazil) Eugenio Saller	5-7, 6-3, 6-3
1951	(Brazil) Bob Falkenburg (2)	(Argentina) Enrique Morea	7-5 6-4 6-3
1953	(United States) Budge Patty	(United States) Art Larsen	7-5, 3-6, 6-1, 7-5.
1964	(Brazil) Ronald Barnes	(Socialist Federal Republic of Yugoslavia) Boro Jovanovic	6-2, 6-2, 6-1
1965	(Italy) Nicola Pietrangeli	(Brazil) Thomaz Koch	6-4, 3-6, 6-3, 6-4
1966	(Brazil) José Edison Mandarino	(United Kingdom) Roger Taylor	7-5, 1-6, 6-3
1967	(Brazil) Thomaz Koch	(Netherlands) Tom Okker	6–4, 11–9, 3–6, 6–3
