= 2019 Rio Open – Doubles =

Doubles
- 2019 Rio Open

Final
- Champions: (Argentina) Máximo González (Chile) Nicolás Jarry
- Runners-up: (Brazil) Thomaz Bellucci (Brazil) Rogério Dutra Silva
- Score: 6–7^{(3–7)}, 6–3, [10–7]

Details
- Draw: 16
- Seeds: 4

Events
Singles	Doubles
← 2018 ·	Rio Open	· 2020 →

David Marrero and Fernando Verdasco were the defending champions, but Verdasco chose not to defend the title and Marrero chose to compete in Marseille instead.

Máximo González and Nicolás Jarry won the title, defeating Thomaz Bellucci and Rogério Dutra Silva in the final, 6–7^{(3–7)}, 6–3, [10–7].

== Seeds ==
1. (Brazil) Marcelo Melo / (Brazil) Bruno Soares (quarterfinals)
2. (Colombia) Juan Sebastián Cabal / (Colombia) Robert Farah (semifinals)
3. (Croatia) Nikola Mektić / (Argentina) Horacio Zeballos (quarterfinals)
4. (Uruguay) Pablo Cuevas / (Spain) Marc López (first round)

== Draw ==
=== Key ===
- Q = Qualifier
- WC = Wild card
- LL = Lucky loser
- Alt = Alternate
- SE = Special exempt
- PR = Protected ranking
- ITF = ITF entry
- JE = Junior exempt
- w/o = Walkover
- r = Retired
- d = Defaulted
- SR = Special ranking

=== Draw ===
First round
1	(Brazil) M Melo (Brazil) B Soares	7^{9}	3	[10]
LL	(Brazil) M Alves (Brazil) T Seyboth Wild	6^{7}	6	[8]
WC	(Brazil) T Bellucci (Brazil) R Dutra Silva	2	6	[10]
Q	(United Kingdom) C Norrie (Portugal) J Sousa	6	3	[4]
4	(Uruguay) P Cuevas (Spain) M López	0	6^{6}
(Brazil) M Demoliner (Denmark) F Nielsen	6	7^{8}
(Tunisia) M Jaziri (Argentina) L Mayer	6	2	[6]
(Czech Republic) R Jebavý (Argentina) A Molteni	2	6	[10]
(Italy) M Cecchinato (Serbia) D Lajović	4	1
(Argentina) M González (Chile) N Jarry	6	6
(United States) A Krajicek (New Zealand) A Sitak	6^{1}	1
3	(Croatia) N Mektić (Argentina) H Zeballos	7^{7}	6
WC	(Brazil) T Monteiro (Brazil) F Romboli	6	3	[11]
(United Kingdom) L Bambridge (United Kingdom) J O'Mara	2	6	[13]
LL	(United States) N Monroe (Mexico) MÁ Reyes-Varela	4	1
2	(Colombia) JS Cabal (Colombia) R Farah	6	6

Quarterfinals
1	(Brazil) M Melo (Brazil) B Soares	2	7^{8}	[5]
WC	(Brazil) T Bellucci (Brazil) R Dutra Silva	6	6^{6}	[10]
(Brazil) M Demoliner (Denmark) F Nielsen	6	4	[3]
(Czech Republic) R Jebavý (Argentina) A Molteni	3	6	[10]
(Argentina) M González (Chile) N Jarry	4	7^{7}	[12]
3	(Croatia) N Mektić (Argentina) H Zeballos	6	6^{5}	[10]
(United Kingdom) L Bambridge (United Kingdom) J O'Mara	2	3
2	(Colombia) JS Cabal (Colombia) R Farah	6	6

Semifinals
WC	(Brazil) T Bellucci (Brazil) R Dutra Silva	6	7^{7}
(Czech Republic) R Jebavý (Argentina) A Molteni	4	6^{3}
(Argentina) M González (Chile) N Jarry	3	7	[10]
2	(Colombia) JS Cabal (Colombia) R Farah	6	5	[7]

Final
WC	(Brazil) T Bellucci (Brazil) R Dutra Silva	7^{7}	3	[7]
(Argentina) M González (Chile) N Jarry	6^{3}	6	[10]

== Qualifying ==
=== Seeds ===
1. (United States) Nicholas Monroe / (Mexico) Miguel Ángel Reyes-Varela (first round, lucky losers)
2. (United Kingdom) Cameron Norrie / (Portugal) João Sousa (qualified)

=== Qualifiers ===
1. (United Kingdom) Cameron Norrie / (Portugal) João Sousa

=== Lucky losers ===
1. (Brazil) Mateus Alves / (Brazil) Thiago Seyboth Wild
2. (United States) Nicholas Monroe / (Mexico) Miguel Ángel Reyes-Varela

=== Qualifying draw ===
First round
1	(United States) Nicholas Monroe (Mexico) Miguel Ángel Reyes-Varela	3	5
WC	(Brazil) Mateus Alves (Brazil) Thiago Seyboth Wild	6	7
(Argentina) Guido Andreozzi (Argentina) Guillermo Durán	2	4
2	(United Kingdom) Cameron Norrie (Portugal) João Sousa	6	6

Qualifying competition
WC	(Brazil) Mateus Alves (Brazil) Thiago Seyboth Wild	4	7^{10}	[4]
2	(United Kingdom) Cameron Norrie (Portugal) João Sousa	6	6^{8}	[10]
