= 2016 Rio Open – Women's singles =

Women's singles
- 2016 Rio Open

Final
- Champion: (Italy) Francesca Schiavone
- Runner-up: (United States) Shelby Rogers
- Score: 2–6, 6–2, 6–2

Events
Singles	men	women
Doubles	men	women
- Rio Open

Sara Errani was the defending champion, but chose to compete in Dubai instead.

Francesca Schiavone won the title, defeating Shelby Rogers in the final, 2–6, 6–2, 6–2.

== Seeds ==
1. (Brazil) Teliana Pereira (first round)
2. (Sweden) Johanna Larsson (second round)
3. (Montenegro) Danka Kovinić (quarterfinals)
4. (United States) Christina McHale (first round)
5. (Slovenia) Polona Hercog (second round)
6. (Spain) Lara Arruabarrena (quarterfinals)
7. (Germany) Tatjana Maria (first round)
8. (Romania) Andreea Mitu (first round)

== Draw ==
Key

- Q = Qualifier
- WC = Wild card
- LL = Lucky loser
- Alt = Alternate
- ITF = ITF entry
- PR = Protected ranking
- SR = Special ranking
- SE = Special exempt
- JE = Junior exempt
- JR = Junior Accelerator Programme entrant
- CO = College Accelerator Programme entrant
- NG = Next Gen Accelerator Program entrant
- w/o = Walkover
- r = Retired
- d = Defaulted

=== Finals ===
Semifinals
(Croatia) Petra Martić	3	3
(Italy) Francesca Schiavone	6	6
WC	(Romania) Sorana Cîrstea	4	4
(United States) Shelby Rogers	6	6

Final
(Italy) Francesca Schiavone	2	6	6
(United States) Shelby Rogers	6	2	2

=== Top half ===
First round
1	(Brazil) T Pereira	3	5
(Croatia) P Martić	6	7
(Spain) MT Torró Flor	6^{8}	7^{7}	2
(New Zealand) M Erakovic	7^{10}	6^{5}	6
(Romania) A Bogdan	6	6
WC	(Brazil) G Cé	2	3
(Sweden) R Peterson	0	3
6	(Spain) L Arruabarrena	6	6
4	(United States) C McHale	6^{5}	6	1
Q	(Netherlands) C Burger	7^{7}	2	6
Q	(Argentina) M Irigoyen	5	5
Q	(Bulgaria) E Kostova	7	7
Q	(Colombia) M Duque Mariño	7	6^{5}	6
(France) P Parmentier	5	7^{7}	3
(Italy) F Schiavone	6	6
7	(Germany) T Maria	1	1

Second round
(Croatia) P Martić	7^{7}	5	6
(New Zealand) M Erakovic	6^{2}	7	2
(Romania) A Bogdan	5	7	3
6	(Spain) L Arruabarrena	7	5	6
Q	(Netherlands) C Burger	6	6
Q	(Bulgaria) E Kostova	3	0
Q	(Colombia) M Duque Mariño	4	6	5
(Italy) F Schiavone	6	4	7

Quarterfinals
(Croatia) P Martić	6	5	7
6	(Spain) L Arruabarrena	4	7	5
Q	(Netherlands) C Burger	6	6^{6}	3
(Italy) F Schiavone	3	7^{8}	6

Semifinals
(Croatia) P Martić	3	3
(Italy) F Schiavone	6	6

=== Bottom half ===
First round
5	(Slovenia) P Hercog	6	6
Q	(United States) J Brady	4	2
WC	(Brazil) B Haddad Maia	2	1
WC	(Romania) S Cîrstea	6	6
(Switzerland) R Oprandi	1	2
(Spain) S Soler Espinosa	6	6
(United States) S Vickery	3	7	4
3	(Montenegro) D Kovinić	6	5	6
8	(Romania) A Mitu	2	2
(United States) S Rogers	6	6
(Paraguay) V Cepede Royg	6^{4}	6	6
(United States) A Tatishvili	7^{7}	1	3
(Israel) J Glushko	3	1
Q	(Brazil) PC Gonçalves	6	6
(Spain) L Domínguez Lino	5	4
2	(Sweden) J Larsson	7	6

Second round
5	(Slovenia) P Hercog	5	6^{3}
WC	(Romania) S Cîrstea	7	7^{7}
(Spain) S Soler Espinosa	2	3
3	(Montenegro) D Kovinić	6	6
(United States) S Rogers	7	6
(Paraguay) V Cepede Royg	5	4
Q	(Brazil) PC Gonçalves	6	6
2	(Sweden) J Larsson	4	4

Quarterfinals
WC	(Romania) S Cîrstea	6	6
3	(Montenegro) D Kovinić	1	2
(United States) S Rogers	6	5	6
Q	(Brazil) PC Gonçalves	2	7	3

Semifinals
WC	(Romania) S Cîrstea	4	4
(United States) S Rogers	6	6

== Qualifying ==
=== Seeds ===
1. (Colombia) Mariana Duque Mariño (qualified)
2. (Greece) Maria Sakkari (qualifying competition)
3. (France) Alizé Lim (qualifying competition)
4. (United States) Katerina Stewart (first round)
5. (Spain) Laura Pous Tió (first round)
6. (Netherlands) Cindy Burger (qualified)
7. (Israel) Shahar Pe'er (first round)
8. (Spain) Sara Sorribes Tormo (qualifying competition)
9. (Liechtenstein) Stephanie Vogt (first round)
10. (Argentina) María Irigoyen (qualified)
11. (Romania) Mihaela Buzărnescu (first round)
12. (United States) Jennifer Brady (qualified)

=== Qualifiers ===
1. (Colombia) Mariana Duque Mariño
2. (United States) Jennifer Brady
3. (Brazil) Paula Cristina Gonçalves
4. (Bulgaria) Elitsa Kostova
5. (Argentina) María Irigoyen
6. (Netherlands) Cindy Burger

=== Draw ===
==== First qualifier ====
First round
1	(Colombia) Mariana Duque Mariño	5	6	6
(Australia) Anastasia Rodionova	7	3	3
(Spain) Paula Badosa Gibert	3	6	6
11	(Romania) Mihaela Buzărnescu	6	1	2

Qualifying competition
1	(Colombia) Mariana Duque Mariño	3	6	6
(Spain) Paula Badosa Gibert	6	3	2

==== Second qualifier ====
First round
2	(Greece) Maria Sakkari	6	6
(Italy) Martina Caregaro	3	0
WC	(Brazil) Maria Silva	0	0
12	(United States) Jennifer Brady	6	6

Qualifying competition
2	(Greece) Maria Sakkari	5	2
12	(United States) Jennifer Brady	7	6

==== Third qualifier ====
First round
3	(France) Alizé Lim	6	6
WC	(Brazil) Laura Pigossi	2	2
WC	(Brazil) Paula Cristina Gonçalves	6	6
7	(Israel) Shahar Pe'er	2	3

Qualifying competition
3	(France) Alizé Lim	3	3
WC	(Brazil) Paula Cristina Gonçalves	6	6

==== Fourth qualifier ====
First round
4	(United States) Katerina Stewart	4	3
(Bulgaria) Elitsa Kostova	6	6
(Georgia (country)) Sofia Shapatava	3	3
8	(Spain) Sara Sorribes Tormo	6	6

Qualifying competition
(Bulgaria) Elitsa Kostova	6	6
8	(Spain) Sara Sorribes Tormo	2	4

==== Fifth qualifier ====
First round
5	(Spain) Laura Pous Tió	2	4
PR	(Italy) Nastassja Burnett	6	6
WC	(Brazil) Carolina Alves	4	0
10	(Argentina) María Irigoyen	6	6

Qualifying competition
PR	(Italy) Nastassja Burnett	3	2
10	(Argentina) María Irigoyen	6	6

==== Sixth qualifier ====
First round
6	(Netherlands) Cindy Burger	7^{10}	6
PR	(Canada) Heidi El Tabakh	6^{8}	1
(France) Fiona Ferro	6	0	6
9	(Liechtenstein) Stephanie Vogt	2	6	2

Qualifying competition
6	(Netherlands) Cindy Burger	6	6
(France) Fiona Ferro	1	0
