= 2017 Rio Open =

- Date: 20–26 February
- Edition: 4th
- Category: ATP World Tour 500
- Draw: 32S / 16D
- Prize money: $1,471,315 (ATP)
- Surface: Clay
- Location: Rio de Janeiro, Brazil
- Venue: Jockey Club Brasileiro

Champions

Singles
- (Austria) Dominic Thiem

Doubles
- (Spain) Pablo Carreño Busta / (Uruguay) Pablo Cuevas
← 2016 ·	Rio Open	· 2018 →

The 2017 Rio Open was a professional men's tennis tournament played on outdoor clay courts. It was the 4th edition of the tournament, and part of the ATP World Tour 500 series of the 2017 ATP World Tour. It took place in Rio de Janeiro, Brazil between 20 February and 26 February 2017. The women's tournament was discontinued starting this year. Second-seeded Dominic Thiem won the singles title.

== Finals ==
=== Singles ===
- (Austria) Dominic Thiem defeated (Spain) Pablo Carreño Busta 7–5, 6–4

=== Doubles ===
- (Spain) Pablo Carreño Busta / (Uruguay) Pablo Cuevas defeated (Colombia) Juan Sebastián Cabal / (Colombia) Robert Farah, 6–4, 5–7, [10–8]

== Points and prize money ==
=== Point distribution ===
Event	W	F	SF	QF	Round of 16	Round of 32	Q	Q2	Q1
Singles	500	300	180	90	45	0	20	10	0
Doubles	500	300	180	90	0	—	45	25	0

=== Prize money ===
Event	W	F	SF	QF	Round of 16	Round of 32^{1}	Q2	Q1
Singles	$314,880	$154,370	$77,680	$39,500	$20,515	$10,820	$2,395	$1,220
Doubles *	$94,800	$46,410	$23,280	$11,950	$6,180	—	—	—
Doubles prize money per team

_{^{1} Qualifiers prize money is also the Round of 32 prize money}

== Singles main-draw entrants ==
=== Seeds ===
Country	Player	Rank^{1}	Seed
JPN	Kei Nishikori	5	1
AUT	Dominic Thiem	8	2
URU	Pablo Cuevas	22	3
ESP	Pablo Carreño Busta	25	4
ESP	Albert Ramos Viñolas	26	5
ESP	David Ferrer	27	6
ITA	Paolo Lorenzi	37	7
POR	João Sousa	41	8

- ^{1} Rankings as of February 13, 2017.

=== Other entrants ===
The following players received wildcards into the main draw:

- (Norway) Casper Ruud
- (Brazil) João Souza
- (Serbia) Janko Tipsarević

The following players received entry from the qualifying draw:

- (Spain) Roberto Carballés Baena
- (Italy) Marco Cecchinato
- (Belgium) Arthur De Greef
- (Argentina) Nicolás Kicker

The following player received entry as a lucky loser:

- (Dominican Republic) Víctor Estrella Burgos

=== Withdrawals ===
Before the tournament

- (Austria) Gerald Melzer (illness) →replaced by (Dominican Republic) Víctor Estrella Burgos

== Doubles main-draw entrants ==
=== Seeds ===
Country	Player	Country	Player	Rank^{1}	Seed
GBR	Jamie Murray	BRA	Bruno Soares	15	1
POL	Łukasz Kubot	BRA	Marcelo Melo	29	2
ESP	Pablo Carreño Busta	URU	Pablo Cuevas	59	3
COL	Juan Sebastián Cabal	COL	Robert Farah	62	4

- ^{1} Rankings as of February 6, 2017.

=== Other entrants ===
The following pairs received wildcards into the main draw:

- (Brazil) Thomaz Bellucci / (Brazil) Thiago Monteiro
- (Brazil) Fabrício Neis / (Brazil) João Souza

The following pair received entry from the qualifying draw:

- (Argentina) Facundo Bagnis / (Portugal) Gastão Elias
