= 2016 Rio Open =

- Date: 15–21 February
- Edition: 3rd
- Draw: 32S / 16D
- Prize money: $1,471,315 (ATP) $250,000 (WTA)
- Surface: Clay
- Location: Rio de Janeiro, Brazil
- Venue: Jockey Club Brasileiro

Champions

Men's singles
- (Uruguay) Pablo Cuevas

Women's singles
- (Italy) Francesca Schiavone

Men's doubles
- (Colombia) Juan Sebastián Cabal / (Colombia) Robert Farah

Women's doubles
- (Paraguay) Verónica Cepede Royg / (Argentina) María Irigoyen
← 2015 ·	Rio Open	· 2017 →

The 2016 Rio Open was a professional tennis tournament played on outdoor clay courts. It was the 3rd edition of the tournament, and part of the 2016 ATP World Tour and the 2016 WTA Tour. It took in Rio de Janeiro, Brazil between 15 February and 21 February 2016.

== Finals ==
=== Men's singles ===
- (Uruguay) Pablo Cuevas defeated (Argentina) Guido Pella 6–4, 6–7^{(5–7)}, 6–4

=== Women's singles ===
- (Italy) Francesca Schiavone defeated (United States) Shelby Rogers 2–6, 6–2, 6–2

=== Men's doubles ===
- (Colombia) Juan Sebastián Cabal / (Colombia) Robert Farah defeated (Spain) Pablo Carreño Busta / (Spain) David Marrero 7–6^{(7–5)}, 6–1

=== Women's doubles ===
- (Paraguay) Verónica Cepede Royg / (Argentina) María Irigoyen defeated (United Kingdom) Tara Moore / (Switzerland) Conny Perrin 6–1, 7–6^{(7–5)}

== Points and prize money ==
=== Point distribution ===
Event	W	F	SF	QF	Round of 16	Round of 32	Q	Q3	Q2	Q1
Men's singles	500	300	180	90	45	0	20	—	10	0
Men's doubles	500	300	180	90	0	—	45	—	25	0
Women's singles	280	180	110	60	30	1	18	14	10	1
Women's doubles	280	180	110	60	1	—	—	—	—	—

=== Prize money ===
Event	W	F	SF	QF	Round of 16	Round of 32^{1}	Q3	Q2	Q1
Men's singles	$303,300	$142,450	$70,735	$35,365	$17,920	$9,430	$1,570	$865	—
Men's doubles	$89,400	$42,240	$20,390	$10,600	$5,550	—	—	—	—
Women's singles	$43,000	$21,400	$11,300	$5,900	$3,310	$1,925	$1,005	$730	$530
Women's doubles	$12,300	$6,400	$3,435	$1,820	$960	—	—	—	—
Doubles prize money per team

_{^{1} Qualifiers prize money is also the Round of 32 prize money}

== ATP singles main-draw entrants ==
=== Seeds ===
Country	Player	Ranking^{1}	Seed
ESP	Rafael Nadal	5	1
ESP	David Ferrer	6	2
FRA	Jo-Wilfried Tsonga	9	3
USA	John Isner	12	4
AUT	Dominic Thiem	19	5
USA	Jack Sock	23	6
ITA	Fabio Fognini	24	7
BRA	Thomaz Bellucci	30	8

- ^{1} Rankings as of February 8, 2016.

=== Other entrants ===
The following players received wildcards into the main draw:

- (Chile) Nicolás Jarry
- (Brazil) Thiago Monteiro
- (Brazil) João Souza

The following players received entry from the qualifying draw:

- (Argentina) Facundo Bagnis
- (Japan) Taro Daniel
- (Portugal) Gastão Elias
- (Spain) Daniel Gimeno Traver

=== Withdrawals ===
Before the tournament

- (Spain) Fernando Verdasco→replaced by (Spain) Daniel Muñoz de la Nava
- (Austria) Andreas Haider-Maurer→replaced by (Serbia) Dušan Lajović

During the tournament

- (Ukraine) Alexandr Dolgopolov (right shoulder injury)

=== Retirements ===
- (Italy) Fabio Fognini (abdominal strain)
- (Serbia) Dušan Lajović (left foot injury)
- (Argentina) Juan Mónaco (right shoulder injury)

== ATP doubles main-draw entrants ==
=== Seeds ===
Country	Player	Country	Player	Rank^{1}	Seed
BRA	Marcelo Melo	BRA	Bruno Soares	11	1
COL	Juan Sebastián Cabal	COL	Robert Farah	50	2
~~URU~~	~~Pablo Cuevas~~	~~ITA~~	~~Fabio Fognini~~	~~53~~	~~3~~
USA	Nicholas Monroe	USA	Jack Sock	68	4

- ^{1} Rankings as of February 8, 2016.

=== Other entrants ===
The following pairs received wildcards into the main draw:

- (Brazil) Fabiano de Paula / (Brazil) Orlando Luz
- (Brazil) Rogério Dutra Silva / (Brazil) João Souza

The following pair received entry from the qualifying draw:

- (Spain) Pablo Carreño / (Spain) David Marrero

The following pair received entry as lucky losers:

- (Argentina) Guillermo Durán / (Austria) Philipp Oswald

=== Withdrawals ===
Before the tournament

- (Italy) Fabio Fognini (abdominal strain)

=== Retirements ===
- (United States) Jack Sock (lower back injury)

== WTA singles main-draw entrants ==
=== Seeds ===
Country	Player	Ranking^{1}	Seed
BRA	Teliana Pereira	44	1
SWE	Johanna Larsson	48	2
MNE	Danka Kovinić	50	3
USA	Christina McHale	62	4
SLO	Polona Hercog	83	5
ESP	Lara Arruabarrena	88	6
GER	Tatjana Maria	90	7
ROU	Andreea Mitu	104	8

- ^{1} Rankings as of February 8, 2016

=== Other entrants ===
The following players received wildcards into the main draw:

- (Brazil) Gabriela Cé
- (Romania) Sorana Cîrstea
- (Brazil) Beatriz Haddad Maia

The following players received entry from the qualifying draw:

- (United States) Jennifer Brady
- (Netherlands) Cindy Burger
- (Colombia) Mariana Duque Mariño
- (Brazil) Paula Cristina Gonçalves
- (Argentina) María Irigoyen
- (Bulgaria) Elitsa Kostova

=== Withdrawals ===
Before the tournament

- (Canada) Eugenie Bouchard (change in schedule) → replaced by (Croatia) Petra Martić
- (Italy) Karin Knapp (left knee injury) → replaced by (Spain) Sílvia Soler Espinosa

== WTA doubles main-draw entrants ==
=== Seeds ===
Country	Player	Country	Player	Rank^{1}	Seed
AUS	Anastasia Rodionova	LIE	Stephanie Vogt	110	1
NZL	Marina Erakovic	ESP	Sílvia Soler Espinosa	201	2
MNE	Danka Kovinić	ROU	Andreea Mitu	214	3
PAR	Verónica Cepede Royg	ARG	María Irigoyen	215	4

- ^{1} Rankings as of February 8, 2016.

=== Other entrants ===
The following pairs received wildcards into the main draw:

- (Brazil) Carolina Alves / (Canada) Heidi El Tabakh
- (France) Alizé Lim / (Italy) Francesca Schiavone

=== Withdrawals ===
During the tournament

- (France) Alizé Lim (neck injury)
