= 2019 Rio Open =

Professional men's tennis tournament played on outdoor clay courts

- Date: 18–24 February
- Edition: 6th
- Draw: 32S / 16D
- Prize money: $1,471,315
- Surface: Clay
- Location: Rio de Janeiro, Brazil
- Venue: Jockey Club Brasileiro

Champions

Singles
- (Serbia) Laslo Đere

Doubles
- (Argentina) Máximo González / (Chile) Nicolás Jarry
- Rio Open

The 2019 Rio Open was a professional men's tennis tournament played on outdoor clay courts. It was the sixth edition of the Rio Open, and formed part of the ATP Tour 500 series of the 2019 ATP Tour. It took place in Rio de Janeiro, Brazil between February 18 and 24, 2019.

There was a plan to move the tournament from the clay court surface in Jockey Club Brasileiro to the outdoor hard courts at the Olympic Tennis Centre, which hosted the tennis events of the 2016 Summer Olympics situated in Barra Olympic Park. The intention was to attract more world class players in the tournament such as Novak Djokovič, Roger Federer, and Andy Murray who consistently declined to play the event. Juan Martín del Potro once said to the Rio Open director Luiz Carvalho that he would play Rio Open when the surface changes.

== Finals ==
=== Singles ===
- (Serbia) Laslo Đere defeated (Canada) Félix Auger-Aliassime, 6–3, 7–5

=== Doubles ===
- (Argentina) Máximo González / (Chile) Nicolás Jarry defeated (Brazil) Thomaz Bellucci / (Brazil) Rogério Dutra Silva, 6–7^{(3–7)}, 6–3, [10–7]

== Points and prize money ==
=== Point distribution ===
Event	W	F	SF	QF	Round of 16	Round of 32	Q	Q2	Q1
Singles	500	300	180	90	45	0	20	10	0
Doubles	500	300	180	90	0	—N/a	45	25	0

=== Prize money ===
Event	W	F	SF	QF	Round of 16	Round of 32^{1}	Q2	Q1
Singles	$369,000	$185,325	$93,500	$49,140	$24,560	$13,590	$5,225	$2,610
Doubles	$115,940	$56,750	$28,460	$14,600	$7,550	—N/a	—N/a	—N/a
Doubles prize money per team

_{^{1} Qualifiers prize money is also the Round of 32 prize money}

== Singles main-draw entrants ==
=== Seeds ===
Country	Player	Rank^{1}	Seed
AUT	Dominic Thiem	8	1
ITA	Fabio Fognini	15	2
ITA	Marco Cecchinato	18	3
ARG	Diego Schwartzman	19	4
POR	João Sousa	41	5
SRB	Dušan Lajović	43	6
TUN	Malek Jaziri	44	7
CHI	Nicolás Jarry	47	8

- ^{1} Rankings as of February 11, 2018.

=== Other entrants ===
The following players received wildcards into the singles main draw:

- (Canada) Félix Auger-Aliassime
- (Brazil) Thiago Monteiro
- (Brazil) Thiago Seyboth Wild

The following players received entry from the qualifying draw:

- (Bolivia) Hugo Dellien
- (Argentina) Juan Ignacio Londero
- (Norway) Casper Ruud
- (Sweden) Elias Ymer

The following player received entry as a lucky loser:

- (Argentina) Carlos Berlocq

=== Withdrawals ===
Before the tournament

- (Spain) Pablo Andújar → replaced by (Argentina) Carlos Berlocq
- (Spain) Pablo Carreño Busta → replaced by (United Kingdom) Cameron Norrie

=== Retirements ===
- (Argentina) Diego Schwartzman
- (Slovenia) Aljaž Bedene

== Doubles main-draw entrants ==
=== Seeds ===
Country	Player	Country	Player	Rank^{1}	Seed
BRA	Marcelo Melo	BRA	Bruno Soares	17	1
COL	Juan Sebastián Cabal	COL	Robert Farah	20	2
CRO	Nikola Mektić	ARG	Horacio Zeballos	37	3
URU	Pablo Cuevas	ESP	Marc López	79	4

- ^{1} Rankings as of February 11, 2019.

=== Other entrants ===
The following pairs received wildcards into the doubles main draw:

- (Brazil) Thomaz Bellucci / (Brazil) Rogério Dutra Silva
- (Brazil) Thiago Monteiro / (Brazil) Fernando Romboli

The following pair received entry from the qualifying draw:

- (United Kingdom) Cameron Norrie / (Portugal) João Sousa

The following pairs received entry as lucky losers:

- (Brazil) Mateus Alves / (Brazil) Thiago Seyboth Wild
- (United States) Nicholas Monroe / (Mexico) Miguel Ángel Reyes-Varela

=== Withdrawals ===
Before the tournament

- (Italy) Fabio Fognini
- (Argentina) Diego Schwartzman
