= 2026 Rio Open =

Professional men's tennis tournament played on outdoor clay courts

- Date: 16–22 February
- Edition: 12th
- Draw: 32S / 16D
- Surface: Clay - outdoor
- Location: Rio de Janeiro, Brazil
- Venue: Jockey Club Brasileiro

Champions

Singles
- (Argentina) Tomás Martín Etcheverry

Doubles
- (Brazil) João Fonseca / (Brazil) Marcelo Melo
- Rio Open

The 2026 Rio Open, also known as Rio Open presented by Claro for sponsorship reasons, was a professional men's tennis tournament played on outdoor clay courts. It was the 12th edition of the Rio Open, and part of the ATP 500 tournaments of the 2026 ATP Tour. It took place in Rio de Janeiro, Brazil between 16 and 22 February, 2026.

== Champions ==
=== Singles ===
- (Argentina) Tomás Martín Etcheverry def. (Chile) Alejandro Tabilo, 3–6, 7–6^{(7–3)}, 6–4

=== Doubles ===
- (Brazil) João Fonseca / (Brazil) Marcelo Melo def. (Germany) Constantin Frantzen / (Netherlands) Robin Haase, 4–6, 6–3, [10–8]

== Singles main-draw entrants ==
=== Seeds ===
Country	Player	Rank^{1}	Seed
ARG	Francisco Cerúndolo	19	1
ITA	Luciano Darderi	22	2
BRA	João Fonseca	33	3
ARG	Sebastián Báez	34	4
ARG	Camilo Ugo Carabelli	47	5
~~FRA~~	~~Alexandre Müller~~	~~48~~	~~6~~
GER	Daniel Altmaier	51	7
ARG	Tomás Martín Etcheverry	54	8

- ^{1} Rankings are as of 9 February 2026.

=== Other entrants ===
The following players received wildcards into the singles main draw:

- (Brazil) Gustavo Heide
- (Brazil) Luís Guto Miguel
- (Brazil) João Lucas Reis da Silva

The following players received entry from the qualifying draw:

- (Lithuania) Vilius Gaubas
- (Brazil) Igor Marcondes
- (Brazil) Thiago Monteiro
- (Croatia) Dino Prižmić

The following players received entry as lucky losers:

- (Chile) Tomás Barrios Vera
- (Portugal) Jaime Faria
- (Serbia) Dušan Lajović
- (Italy) Francesco Passaro

=== Withdrawals ===
- (Serbia) Laslo Djere → replaced by (Chile) Tomás Barrios Vera (LL)
- (France) Alexandre Müller → replaced by (Italy) Francesco Passaro (LL)
- (Italy) Lorenzo Musetti → replaced by (Germany) Yannick Hanfmann
- (Italy) Lorenzo Sonego → replaced by (Serbia) Dušan Lajović (LL)
- (Spain) Carlos Taberner → replaced by (Portugal) Jaime Faria (LL)

== Doubles main-draw entrants ==
=== Seeds ===
Country	Player	Country	Player	Rank^{1}	Seed
FRA	Sadio Doumbia	FRA	Fabien Reboul	53	1
ARG	Máximo González	ARG	Andrés Molteni	55	2
ARG	Guido Andreozzi	FRA	Manuel Guinard	56	3
USA	Evan King	AUS	John Peers	71	4

- ^{1} Rankings as of 9 February 2026.

=== Other entrants ===
The following pairs received wildcards into the doubles main draw:

- (Brazil) João Fonseca / (Brazil) Marcelo Melo
- (Brazil) Felipe Meligeni Alves / (Brazil) Marcelo Zormann

The following pair received entry from the qualifying draw:

- (Ecuador) Gonzalo Escobar / (Netherlands) Jean-Julien Rojer

The following pair received entry as alternates:

- (Argentina) Román Andrés Burruchaga / (Italy) Andrea Pellegrino

The following pairs received entry as lucky losers:

- (Colombia) Nicolás Barrientos / (Argentina) Thiago Agustín Tirante
- (Brazil) Gustavo Heide / (Brazil) Luís Guto Miguel

=== Withdrawals ===
- (Argentina) Francisco Cerúndolo / (Argentina) Francisco Comesaña → replaced by (Colombia) Nicolás Barrientos / (Argentina) Thiago Agustín Tirante
- (Bosnia and Herzegovina) Damir Džumhur / (France) Alexandre Müller → replaced by (Argentina) Román Andrés Burruchaga / (Italy) Andrea Pellegrino
- (Austria) Alexander Erler / (United States) Robert Galloway → replaced by (Brazil) Gustavo Heide / (Brazil) Luís Guto Miguel
