= 2017 Rio Open – Doubles =

Tennis competition

Doubles
- 2017 Rio Open

Final
- Champions: (Spain) Pablo Carreño Busta (Uruguay) Pablo Cuevas
- Runners-up: (Colombia) Juan Sebastián Cabal (Colombia) Robert Farah
- Score: 6–4, 5–7, [10–8]

Details
- Draw: 16
- Seeds: 4

Events
Singles	Doubles
- Rio Open

Juan Sebastián Cabal and Robert Farah were the defending champions, but lost in the final to Pablo Carreño Busta and Pablo Cuevas, 4–6, 7–5, [8–10].

== Seeds ==
1. (United Kingdom) Jamie Murray / (Brazil) Bruno Soares (semifinals)
2. (Poland) Łukasz Kubot / (Brazil) Marcelo Melo (quarterfinals)
3. (Spain) Pablo Carreño Busta / (Uruguay) Pablo Cuevas (champions)
4. (Colombia) Juan Sebastián Cabal / (Colombia) Robert Farah (final)

== Draw ==
Key

- Q = Qualifier
- WC = Wild card
- LL = Lucky loser
- Alt = Alternate
- ITF = ITF entry
- PR = Protected ranking
- SR = Special ranking
- SE = Special exempt
- JE = Junior exempt
- JR = Junior Accelerator Programme entrant
- CO = College Accelerator Programme entrant
- NG = Next Gen Accelerator Program entrant
- w/o = Walkover
- r = Retired
- d = Defaulted

=== Draw ===
First round
1	(United Kingdom) J Murray (Brazil) B Soares	6	6
(New Zealand) M Daniell (Brazil) M Demoliner	4	2
PR	(Spain) T Robredo (Brazil) A Sá	4	3
(Argentina) A Molteni (Argentina) D Schwartzman	6	6
3	(Spain) P Carreño Busta (Uruguay) P Cuevas	6	6
(Mexico) S González (Spain) D Marrero	3	3
(Italy) P Lorenzi (Portugal) J Sousa	6	6^{8}	[5]
Q	(Argentina) F Bagnis (Portugal) G Elias	2	7^{10}	[10]
(Argentina) G Durán (Spain) A Ramos Viñolas	6^{5}	6^{5}
(United States) N Monroe (New Zealand) A Sitak	7^{7}	7^{7}
WC	(Brazil) T Bellucci (Brazil) T Monteiro	1	4
4	(Colombia) JS Cabal (Colombia) R Farah	6	6
PR	(Italy) S Bolelli (Italy) F Fognini	6	6^{2}	[8]
(Chile) J Peralta (Argentina) H Zeballos	4	7^{7}	[10]
WC	(Brazil) F Neis (Brazil) J Souza	1	6^{4}
2	(Poland) Ł Kubot (Brazil) M Melo	6	7^{7}

Quarterfinals
1	(United Kingdom) J Murray (Brazil) B Soares	6	5	[11]
(Argentina) A Molteni (Argentina) D Schwartzman	3	7	[9]
3	(Spain) P Carreño Busta (Uruguay) P Cuevas	6	7
Q	(Argentina) F Bagnis (Portugal) G Elias	4	5
(United States) N Monroe (New Zealand) A Sitak	2	2
4	(Colombia) JS Cabal (Colombia) R Farah	6	6
(Chile) J Peralta (Argentina) H Zeballos	6	6
2	(Poland) Ł Kubot (Brazil) M Melo	4	4

Semifinals
1	(United Kingdom) J Murray (Brazil) B Soares	4	6	[10]
3	(Spain) P Carreño Busta (Uruguay) P Cuevas	6	3	[12]
4	(Colombia) JS Cabal (Colombia) R Farah	6^{4}	7^{8}	[10]
(Chile) J Peralta (Argentina) H Zeballos	7^{7}	6^{6}	[6]

Final
3	(Spain) P Carreño Busta (Uruguay) P Cuevas	6	5	[10]
4	(Colombia) JS Cabal (Colombia) R Farah	4	7	[8]

== Qualifying ==
=== Seeds ===
1. (Brazil) Guilherme Clezar / (Brazil) Fabiano de Paula (first round)
2. (Argentina) Facundo Bagnis / (Portugal) Gastão Elias (qualified)

=== Qualifiers ===
1. (Argentina) Facundo Bagnis / (Portugal) Gastão Elias

=== Qualifying draw ===
First round
1	(Brazil) Guilherme Clezar (Brazil) Fabiano de Paula	5	4
(Italy) Federico Gaio (Italy) Alessandro Giannessi	7	6
WC	(Brazil) Orlando Luz (Brazil) Felipe Meligeni Alves	4	6^{5}
2	(Argentina) Facundo Bagnis (Portugal) Gastão Elias	6	7^{7}

Qualifying competition
(Italy) Federico Gaio (Italy) Alessandro Giannessi	4	6	[7]
2	(Argentina) Facundo Bagnis (Portugal) Gastão Elias	6	2	[10]
