= Rio Open =

Tennis tournament in Brazil

- 2026 Rio Open

Tournament information
- Founded: 2014
- Editions: 11
- Location: Rio de Janeiro; Brazil
- Venue: Jockey Club Brasileiro
- Surface: Clay (outdoors)
- Website: rioopen.com

Current champions (2026)
- Men's singles: (Argentina) Tomás Martín Etcheverry
- Men's doubles: (Brazil) João Fonseca (Brazil) Marcelo Melo
ATP Tour
- Category: ATP Tour 500
- Draw: 32S / 16Q / 16D / 4Q
- Prize money: US$2,178,980 (2023)
WTA Tour
- Category: WTA International Tournaments (2014–2016)
- Draw: 32S / 24Q / 16D
- Prize money: US$250,000 (2016)

The Rio Open, also known as the Rio Open presented by Claro for sponsorship reasons, is a tennis event on the ATP Tour and a former WTA tour-level event. The tournament is played on outdoor clay courts at the Jockey Club Brasileiro in Rio de Janeiro, Brazil. It is the only ATP Tour 500 event in South America and the only ATP Tour event in Brazil (since 2020).

== History ==
There have been a number of precursor tournaments to this one held in Rio de Janeiro. The Rio de Janeiro International was a combined men's and women's event played on outdoor clay courts as part of the ILTF South American Circuit from 1947 to 1967 at the Rio de Janeiro Country Club. Later, the Rio de Janeiro Open was played on indoor carpet courts from 1989 to 1990 and was the first ATP World Series event played in Brazil. The licence for the men's event was taken over from the U.S. National Indoor Championships which did continue but was downgraded from an ATP 500 to an ATP 250 tournament.

The first edition in 2014 was headlined by former world number one, Rafael Nadal and fellow Spanish player David Ferrer. Both of them are well known clay court specialists.

The women's tournament was discontinued and replaced by Hungarian Ladies Open after the 2016 edition.

Prior to the 2019 edition, there was talk of moving the tournament from the clay court surface of Jockey Club Brasileiro to the outdoor hard courts at the Olympic Tennis Centre, which hosted the tennis events of the 2016 Summer Olympics situated in Barra Olympic Park. The reasoning was to attract more world-class players to the tournament such as Novak Djokovic, Roger Federer, and Andy Murray who consistently declined to play the event. Juan Martin del Potro once mentioned to the Rio Open director Luiz Carvalho that he would enter the Rio Open when the surface changes. This change never occurred.

== Past finals ==
=== Men's singles ===
Year	Champion	Runner-up	Score
2014	(Spain) Rafael Nadal	(Ukraine) Alexandr Dolgopolov	6–3, 7–6^{(7–3)}
2015	(Spain) David Ferrer	(Italy) Fabio Fognini	6–2, 6–3
2016	(Uruguay) Pablo Cuevas	(Argentina) Guido Pella	6–4, 6–7^{(5–7)}, 6–4
2017	(Austria) Dominic Thiem	(Spain) Pablo Carreño Busta	7–5, 6–4
2018	(Argentina) Diego Schwartzman	(Spain) Fernando Verdasco	6–2, 6–3
2019	(Serbia) Laslo Djere	(Canada) Félix Auger-Aliassime	6–3, 7–5
2020	(Chile) Cristian Garín	(Italy) Gianluca Mager	7–6^{(7–3)}, 7–5
2021	Not held due to COVID-19 pandemic		
2022	(Spain) Carlos Alcaraz	(Argentina) Diego Schwartzman	6–4, 6–2
2023	(United Kingdom) Cameron Norrie	(Spain) Carlos Alcaraz	5–7, 6–4, 7–5
2024	(Argentina) Sebastián Báez	(Argentina) Mariano Navone	6–2, 6–1
2025	(Argentina) Sebastián Báez (2)	(France) Alexandre Müller	6–2, 6–3
2026	(Argentina) Tomás Martín Etcheverry	(Chile) Alejandro Tabilo	3–6, 7–6^{(7–3)}, 6–4

=== Men's doubles ===
Year	Champions	Runner-up	Score
2014	(Colombia) Juan Sebastián Cabal (Colombia) Robert Farah	(Spain) David Marrero (Brazil) Marcelo Melo	6–4, 6–2
2015	(Slovakia) Martin Kližan (Austria) Philipp Oswald	(Spain) Pablo Andújar (Austria) Oliver Marach	7–6^{(7–3)}, 6–4
2016	(Colombia) Juan Sebastián Cabal (2) (Colombia) Robert Farah (2)	(Spain) Pablo Carreño Busta (Spain) David Marrero	7–6^{(7–5)}, 6–1
2017	(Spain) Pablo Carreño Busta (Uruguay) Pablo Cuevas	(Colombia) Juan Sebastián Cabal (Colombia) Robert Farah	6–4, 5–7, [10–8]
2018	(Spain) David Marrero (Spain) Fernando Verdasco	(Croatia) Nikola Mektić (Austria) Alexander Peya	5–7, 7–5, [10–8]
2019	(Argentina) Máximo González (Chile) Nicolás Jarry	(Brazil) Thomaz Bellucci (Brazil) Rogério Dutra Silva	6–7^{(3–7)}, 6–3, [10–7]
2020	(Spain) Marcel Granollers (Argentina) Horacio Zeballos	(Italy) Salvatore Caruso (Italy) Federico Gaio	6–4, 5–7, [10–7]
2021	Not held due to COVID-19 pandemic		
2022	(Italy) Simone Bolelli (Italy) Fabio Fognini	(United Kingdom) Jamie Murray (Brazil) Bruno Soares	7–5, 6–7^{(2–7)}, [10–6]
2023	(Argentina) Máximo González (2) (Argentina) Andrés Molteni	(Colombia) Juan Sebastián Cabal (Brazil) Marcelo Melo	6–1, 7–6^{(7–3)}
2024	(Colombia) Nicolás Barrientos (Brazil) Rafael Matos	(Austria) Alexander Erler (Austria) Lucas Miedler	6–4, 6–3
2025	(Brazil) Rafael Matos (2) (Brazil) Marcelo Melo	(Spain) Pedro Martínez (Spain) Jaume Munar	6–2, 7–5
2026	(Brazil) João Fonseca (Brazil) Marcelo Melo (2)	(Germany) Constantin Frantzen (Netherlands) Robin Haase	3–6, 6–3, [10–8]

=== Women's singles ===
Year	Champion	Runner-up	Score
2014	(Japan) Kurumi Nara	(Czech Republic) Klára Zakopalová	6–1, 4–6, 6–1
2015	(Italy) Sara Errani	(Slovakia) Anna Karolína Schmiedlová	7–6^{(7–2)}, 6–1
2016	(Italy) Francesca Schiavone	(United States) Shelby Rogers	2–6, 6–2, 6–2

=== Women's doubles ===
Year	Champions	Runner-up	Score
2014	(Romania) Irina-Camelia Begu (Argentina) María Irigoyen	(Sweden) Johanna Larsson (South Africa) Chanelle Scheepers	6–2, 6–0
2015	(Belgium) Ysaline Bonaventure (Sweden) Rebecca Peterson	(Romania) Irina-Camelia Begu (Argentina) María Irigoyen	3–0, ret.
2016	(Paraguay) Verónica Cepede Royg (Argentina) María Irigoyen (2)	(United Kingdom) Tara Moore (Switzerland) Conny Perrin	6–1, 7–6^{(7–5)}

== See also ==
- Rio de Janeiro Open – men's Grand Prix tournament (1989–1990)
- Rio Tennis Classic – men's Challenger tournament (2017)
