= 2024 Swedish Open – Women's doubles =

Women's doubles
- 2024 Swedish Open

Final
- Champions: (Thailand) Peangtarn Plipuech (Chinese Taipei) Tsao Chia-yi
- Runners-up: (Argentina) María Lourdes Carlé (Argentina) Julia Riera
- Score: 7–5, 6–3

Events
Singles	men	women
Doubles	men	women
← 2023 ·	Swedish Open	· 2025 →

Peangtarn Plipuech and Tsao Chia-yi won the title, defeating María Lourdes Carlé and Julia Riera in the final, 7–5, 6–3.

Irina Khromacheva and Panna Udvardy were the reigning champions, but chose not to participate this year.

== Seeds ==
1. Amina Anshba / (Czech Republic) Anastasia Dețiuc (first round)
2. (United States) Sabrina Santamaria / (Mexico) Renata Zarazúa (semifinals)
3. (United States) Quinn Gleason / (Ukraine) Yuliia Starodubtseva (semifinals)
4. (Thailand) Peangtarn Plipuech / (Chinese Taipei) Tsao Chia-yi (champions)

== Draw ==
=== Key ===
- Q = Qualifier
- WC = Wild card
- LL = Lucky loser
- Alt = Alternate
- ITF = ITF entry
- PR = Protected ranking
- SR = Special ranking
- SE = Special exempt
- JE = Junior exempt
- JR = Junior Accelerator Programme entrant
- CO = College Accelerator Programme entrant
- NG = Next Gen Accelerator Program entrant
- w/o = Walkover
- r = Retired
- d = Defaulted

=== Draw ===
First round
1	A Anshba (Czech Republic) A Dețiuc	3	4
(Argentina) ML Carlé (Argentina) J Riera	6	6
(Greece) E Christofi (Bosnia and Herzegovina) A Wagner	6	6^{4}	[4]
(Belgium) M Kempen (Belgium) L Salden	3	7^{7}	[10]
3	(United States) Q Gleason (Ukraine) Y Starodubtseva	6	6
A Fomina-Klotz; E Makarova	2	0
(United States) C Corley (United States) I Corley	6	3	[3]
(Sweden) C Hennemann (Sweden) L Zaar	3	6	[10]
(Slovenia) V Erjavec (Slovenia) T Zidanšek
(United States) C Rosca (United States) A Smith	w/o
(Ukraine) M Kolb (Ukraine) N Kolb	3	3
4	(Thailand) P Plipuech (Chinese Taipei) C-y Tsao	6	6
WC	(Sweden) L Bajraliu (Sweden) N Taraba Wallberg	6	6
(Germany) T Korpatsch (India) P Thombare	1	4
(France) C Paquet (Latvia) D Semeņistaja	4	2
2	(United States) S Santamaria (Mexico) R Zarazúa	6	6

Quarterfinals
(Argentina) ML Carlé (Argentina) J Riera	6	4	[10]
(Belgium) M Kempen (Belgium) L Salden	0	6	[4]
3	(United States) Q Gleason (Ukraine) Y Starodubtseva	6	6
(Sweden) C Hennemann (Sweden) L Zaar	4	1
(United States) C Rosca (United States) A Smith	4	2
4	(Thailand) P Plipuech (Chinese Taipei) C-y Tsao	6	6
WC	(Sweden) L Bajraliu (Sweden) N Taraba Wallberg	1	4
2	(United States) S Santamaria (Mexico) R Zarazúa	6	6

Semifinals
(Argentina) ML Carlé (Argentina) J Riera	6^{5}	6	[11]
3	(United States) Q Gleason (Ukraine) Y Starodubtseva	7^{7}	1	[9]
4	(Thailand) P Plipuech (Chinese Taipei) C-y Tsao	6	6
2	(United States) S Santamaria (Mexico) R Zarazúa	4	3

Final
(Argentina) ML Carlé (Argentina) J Riera	5	3
4	(Thailand) P Plipuech (Chinese Taipei) C-y Tsao	7	6
