= 2023 Swedish Open – Women's singles =

Women's singles
- 2023 Swedish Open

Final
- Champion: (Serbia) Olga Danilović
- Runner-up: (United States) Emma Navarro
- Score: 7–6^{(7–4)}, 3–6, 6–3

Events
Singles	men	women
Doubles	men	women
← 2022 ·	Swedish Open	· 2024 →

Jang Su-jeong was the defending champion, but lost in the first round to Rebecca Peterson.

Olga Danilović won the title, defeating Emma Navarro in the final, 7–6^{(7–4)}, 3–6, 6–3.

== Seeds ==
1. (United States) Emma Navarro (final)
2. (Kazakhstan) Yulia Putintseva (semifinals)
3. Kamilla Rakhimova (withdrew)
4. (Sweden) Rebecca Peterson (second round)
5. (Hungary) Panna Udvardy (second round)
6. (Ukraine) Kateryna Baindl (first round)
7. (United States) Claire Liu (quarterfinals)
8. (Serbia) Olga Danilović (champion)
9. (Bulgaria) Viktoriya Tomova (quarterfinals)

== Draw ==
=== Key ===
- Q = Qualifier
- WC = Wild card
- LL = Lucky loser
- Alt = Alternate
- SE = Special exempt
- PR = Protected ranking
- ITF = ITF entry
- JE = Junior exempt
- w/o = Walkover
- r = Retired
- d = Defaulted
- SR = Special ranking

=== Finals ===
Semifinals
1	(United States) Emma Navarro	6	6
(United States) Louisa Chirico	4	4
8	(Serbia) Olga Danilović	6	0	6
2	(Kazakhstan) Yulia Putintseva	4	6	2

Final
1	(United States) Emma Navarro	6^{4}	6	3
8	(Serbia) Olga Danilović	7^{7}	3	6

=== Top half ===
First round
1	(United States) E Navarro	6	6
P Kudermetova	3	2
(Sweden) M Björklund	6	6
WC	(Sweden) J Cabaj Awad	1	4
Alt	(United Kingdom) E Appleton	3	2
(Slovenia) T Zidanšek	6	6
(Thailand) P Plipuech	7^{9}	0	1
5	(Hungary) P Udvardy	6^{7}	6	6
4	(Sweden) R Peterson	7^{7}	6
(South Korea) S-j Jang	6^{2}	4
Alt	(Norway) M Helgø	1	4
(United States) L Chirico	6	6
I Khromacheva	6	2	6
(Sweden) K Rinaldo Persson	3	6	0
Alt	(Romania) O Gavrilă	3	1
7	(United States) C Liu	6	6

Second round
1	(United States) E Navarro	7^{7}	1	6
(Sweden) M Björklund	6^{2}	6	1
(Slovenia) T Zidanšek	6	6
5	(Hungary) P Udvardy	2	1
4	(Sweden) R Peterson	6^{4}	7	1
(United States) L Chirico	7^{7}	5	6
I Khromacheva	2	4
7	(United States) C Liu	6	6

Quarterfinals
1	(United States) E Navarro	6	6
(Slovenia) T Zidanšek	0	4
(United States) L Chirico	6	3	6
7	(United States) C Liu	4	6	1

Semifinals
1	(United States) E Navarro	6	6
(United States) L Chirico	4	4

=== Bottom half ===
First round
8	(Serbia) O Danilović	0	6	6
(Hungary) RL Jani	6	3	0
WC	(Sweden) N Taraba Wallberg	3	6	6
(Sweden) C Hennemann	6	4	3
(France) C Paquet	6	6
(Uzbekistan) N Abduraimova	1	3
(Latvia) D Semeņistaja	1	4
9	(Bulgaria) V Tomova	6	6
6	(Ukraine) K Baindl	6	5	6^{4}
(Spain) A Bolsova	3	7	7^{7}
WC	(Sweden) B Bergkvist Larsson	2	2
PR	(Slovenia) P Hercog	6	6
(Argentina) J Riera	4	5
(United States) K Volynets	6	7
WC	(Sweden) L Zaar	3	4
2	(Kazakhstan) Y Putintseva	6	6

Second round
8	(Serbia) O Danilović	6	6
WC	(Sweden) N Taraba Wallberg	0	2
(France) C Paquet	6^{12}	4
9	(Bulgaria) V Tomova	7^{14}	6
(Spain) A Bolsova	6	6
PR	(Slovenia) P Hercog	3	3
(United States) K Volynets	0	0^{r}
2	(Kazakhstan) Y Putintseva	6	1

Quarterfinals
8	(Serbia) O Danilović	6	6
9	(Bulgaria) V Tomova	3	3
(Spain) A Bolsova	6	6^{2}	4
2	(Kazakhstan) Y Putintseva	2	7^{7}	6

Semifinals
8	(Serbia) O Danilović	6	0	6
2	(Kazakhstan) Y Putintseva	4	6	2
