= 2024 Swedish Open – Women's singles =

Women's singles
- 2024 Swedish Open

Final
- Champion: (Italy) Martina Trevisan
- Runner-up: (United States) Ann Li
- Score: 6–2, 6–2

Events
Singles	men	women
Doubles	men	women
← 2023 ·	Swedish Open	· 2025 →

Martina Trevisan won the title, defeating Ann Li in the final, 6–2, 6–2.

Olga Danilović was the reigning champion, but chose not to participate this year.

== Seeds ==
1. (France) Diane Parry (quarterfinals)
2. (Romania) Jaqueline Cristian (second round)
3. (Germany) Tamara Korpatsch (quarterfinals)
4. (Slovakia) Anna Karolína Schmiedlová (second round)
5. (United States) Taylor Townsend (withdrew, still playing at Wimbledon)
6. (Argentina) María Lourdes Carlé (second round)
7. (Italy) Martina Trevisan (champion)
8. (Mexico) Renata Zarazúa (first round)
9. Kamilla Rakhimova (second round)

== Draw ==
=== Key ===
- Q = Qualifier
- WC = Wild card
- LL = Lucky loser
- Alt = Alternate
- ITF = ITF entry
- PR = Protected ranking
- SR = Special ranking
- SE = Special exempt
- JE = Junior exempt
- JR = Junior Accelerator Programme entrant
- CO = College Accelerator Programme entrant
- NG = Next Gen Accelerator Program entrant
- w/o = Walkover
- r = Retired
- d = Defaulted

=== Finals ===
Semifinals
7	(Italy) Martina Trevisan	6^{5}	6	6
(United States) Louisa Chirico	7^{7}	4	4
(Spain) Nuria Párrizas Díaz	4	4
(United States) Ann Li	6	6

Final
7	(Italy) Martina Trevisan	6	6
(United States) Ann Li	2	2

=== Top half ===
First round
1	(France) D Parry	1	7^{8}	6
WC	(Sweden) C Hennemann	6	6^{6}	4
(Latvia) D Semeņistaja	6	6
WC	(Sweden) M Björklund	4	2
(France) C Paquet	4	2
(Romania) M Bulgaru	6	6
(Australia) A Sharma	7	5	3
7	(Italy) M Trevisan	5	7	6
4	(Slovakia) AK Schmiedlová	6	7
E Makarova	2	5
(Ukraine) K Zavatska	7	6
(Ukraine) Y Starodubtseva	5	1
Alt	(Romania) I Bara	1	6^{4}
(Thailand) M Sawangkaew	6	7^{7}
(United States) L Chirico	3	6	6
8	(Mexico) R Zarazúa	6	4	2

Second round
1	(France) D Parry	6	6
(Latvia) D Semeņistaja	4	1
(Romania) M Bulgaru	4	4
7	(Italy) M Trevisan	6	6
4	(Slovakia) AK Schmiedlová	7	2	3
(Ukraine) K Zavatska	5	6	6
(Thailand) M Sawangkaew	2	3
(United States) L Chirico	6	6

Quarterfinals
1	(France) D Parry	2	6^{5}
7	(Italy) M Trevisan	6	7^{7}
(Ukraine) K Zavatska	2	2
(United States) L Chirico	6	6

Semifinals
7	(Italy) M Trevisan	6^{5}	6	6
(United States) L Chirico	7^{7}	4	4

=== Bottom half ===
First round
6	(Argentina) ML Carlé	6	6
(Spain) R Masarova	1	2
(Argentina) J Riera	3	1
(Spain) N Párrizas Díaz	6	6
WC	(Sweden) K Rinaldo Persson	6	2	1
(Slovenia) T Zidanšek	1	6	6
(Germany) E Seidel	4	7^{7}	4
3	(Germany) T Korpatsch	6	6^{4}	6
9	K Rakhimova	6	7
(Slovenia) V Erjavec	1	5
(United States) A Li	6	6
(Slovakia) R Šramková	2	2
Alt	(Ukraine) A Soboleva	6	2	5
(Poland) K Kawa	2	6	7
WC	(Sweden) N Taraba Wallberg	2	2
2	(Romania) J Cristian	6	6

Second round
6	(Argentina) ML Carlé	4	7^{8}	5
(Spain) N Párrizas Díaz	6	6^{6}	7
(Slovenia) T Zidanšek	7^{7}	4	0^{r}
3	(Germany) T Korpatsch	6^{3}	6	0
9	K Rakhimova	2	2
(United States) A Li	6	6
(Poland) K Kawa	6^{4}	6	7^{9}
2	(Romania) J Cristian	7^{7}	3	6^{7}

Quarterfinals
(Spain) N Párrizas Díaz	6	4	7
3	(Germany) T Korpatsch	2	6	5
(United States) A Li	6	6
(Poland) K Kawa	4	2

Semifinals
(Spain) N Párrizas Díaz	4	4
(United States) A Li	6	6
