= 2025 Swedish Open – Women's singles =

Women's singles
- 2025 Swedish Open

Final
- Champion: (Italy) Elisabetta Cocciaretto
- Runner-up: (Poland) Katarzyna Kawa
- Score: 6–3, 6–4

Details
- Draw: 32
- Seeds: 8

Events
Singles	men	women
Doubles	men	women
← 2024 ·	Swedish Open	· 2026 →

Elisabetta Cocciaretto won the title, defeating Katarzyna Kawa in the final, 6–3, 6–4.

Martina Trevisan was the defending champion, but lost in the second round to Kawa.

== Seeds ==
1. (Italy) Lucia Bronzetti (quarterfinals)
2. (France) Loïs Boisson (second round)
3. (Japan) Moyuka Uchijima (first round)
4. (Spain) Nuria Párrizas Díaz (first round)
5. (Egypt) Mayar Sherif (semifinals)
6. (Croatia) Antonia Ružić (semifinals)
7. (Hungary) Dalma Gálfi (quarterfinals, retired)
8. (Italy) Elisabetta Cocciaretto (champion)

== Draw ==
=== Key ===
- Q = Qualifier
- WC = Wild card
- LL = Lucky loser
- Alt = Alternate
- ITF = ITF entry
- PR = Protected ranking
- SR = Special ranking
- SE = Special exempt
- JE = Junior exempt
- JR = Junior Accelerator Programme entrant
- CO = College Accelerator Programme entrant
- NG = Next Gen Accelerator Program entrant
- w/o = Walkover
- r = Retired
- d = Defaulted

=== Finals ===
Semifinals
6	(Croatia) Antonia Ružić	3	4
8	(Italy) Elisabetta Cocciaretto	6	6
(Poland) Katarzyna Kawa	2	7^{7}	6
5	(Egypt) Mayar Sherif	6	6^{5}	1

Final
8	(Italy) Elisabetta Cocciaretto	6	6
(Poland) Katarzyna Kawa	3	4

=== Top half ===
First round
1	(Italy) L Bronzetti	6	6
WC	(Sweden) L Bajraliu	2	2
(Germany) J Niemeier	6	6
(Japan) N Hibino	1	2
(Germany) T Korpatsch	6	1	4
(Germany) M Barthel	4	6	6
(Hungary) P Udvardy	6	4	3
6	(Croatia) A Ružić	2	6	6
3	(Japan) M Uchijima	5	4
(United States) L Chirico	7	6
(Croatia) J Fett	6	4	6
E Makarova	4	6	2
WC	(Sweden) K Rinaldo Persson	4	3
(Lithuania) J Mikulskytė	6	6
(Spain) I Burillo	5	6	6^{4}
8	(Italy) E Cocciaretto	7	2	7^{7}

Second round
1	(Italy) L Bronzetti	6	4	6
(Germany) J Niemeier	2	6	2
(Germany) M Barthel	4	6	6^{1}
6	(Croatia) A Ružić	6	4	7^{7}
(United States) L Chirico	4	7^{8}	7
(Croatia) J Fett	6	6^{6}	5
(Lithuania) J Mikulskytė	1	2
8	(Italy) E Cocciaretto	6	6

Quarterfinals
1	(Italy) L Bronzetti	4	2
6	(Croatia) A Ružić	6	6
(United States) L Chirico	7	3	1
8	(Italy) E Cocciaretto	5	6	6

Semifinals
6	(Croatia) A Ružić	3	4
8	(Italy) E Cocciaretto	6	6

=== Bottom half ===
First round
7	(Hungary) D Gálfi	6	6
PR	(Slovenia) K Juvan	2	4
(Spain) L Romero Gormaz	6	6
(Austria) J Grabher	2	3
(Australia) A Sharma	6	6^{6}	3
(Italy) M Trevisan	2	7^{8}	6
(Poland) K Kawa	7^{7}	0	6
4	(Spain) N Párrizas Díaz	6^{1}	6	3
5	(Egypt) M Sherif	3	6	6
WC	(Sweden) C Hennemann	6	1	2
PR	(Turkey) B Cengiz	3	1
(United States) V Lepchenko	6	6
(Argentina) ML Carlé	2	2
(Latvia) D Semeņistaja	6	6
(France) C Paquet	3	4
2/WC	(France) L Boisson	6	6

Second round
7	(Hungary) D Gálfi	6	3	6
(Spain) L Romero Gormaz	0	6	2
(Italy) M Trevisan	2	3
(Poland) K Kawa	6	6
5	(Egypt) M Sherif	6	6
(United States) V Lepchenko	1	4
(Latvia) D Semeņistaja	6	6
2/WC	(France) L Boisson	3	4

Quarterfinals
7	(Hungary) D Gálfi	1^{r}
(Poland) K Kawa	4
5	(Egypt) M Sherif	6	3	6
(Latvia) D Semeņistaja	3	6	3

Semifinals
(Poland) K Kawa	2	7^{7}	6
5	(Egypt) M Sherif	6	6^{5}	1
