= 2023 Wimbledon Championships – Men's singles =

Tennis championship

Gentlemen's singles
- 2023 Wimbledon Championships

Final
- Champion: (Spain) Carlos Alcaraz
- Runner-up: (Serbia) Novak Djokovic
- Score: 1–6, 7–6^{(8–6)}, 6–1, 3–6, 6–4

Details
- Draw: 128
- Seeds: 32

Events
Singles	men	women		boys	girls
Doubles	men	women	mixed	boys	girls
WC Singles	men	women	quad
WC Doubles	men	women	quad
Legends	men	women	mixed
14&U Singles	boys	girls
- Wimbledon Championships

Carlos Alcaraz defeated four-time defending champion Novak Djokovic in the final, 1–6, 7–6^{(8–6)}, 6–1, 3–6, 6–4 to win the gentlemen's singles tennis title at the 2023 Wimbledon Championships. It was his first Wimbledon title and second major title overall.

Alcaraz, Djokovic, and Daniil Medvedev were in contention for the world No. 1 singles ranking. Alcaraz retained the No. 1 ranking with his victory, and became the first player to qualify for the year-end championships.

For the first time since 2002, the top seed and the winner of the event was not a member of the Big Four, halting their streak at 19-consecutive Wimbledon titles. This tournament marked the final Wimbledon singles appearance of two-time champion, two-time Olympic gold medalist, and former world No. 1 Andy Murray. He lost in the second round to Stefanos Tsitsipas.

== Seeds ==
1. (Spain) Carlos Alcaraz (champion)
2. (Serbia) Novak Djokovic (final)
3. Daniil Medvedev (semifinals)
4. (Norway) Casper Ruud (second round)
5. (Greece) Stefanos Tsitsipas (fourth round)
6. (Denmark) Holger Rune (quarterfinals)
7. Andrey Rublev (quarterfinals)
8. (Italy) Jannik Sinner (semifinals)
9. (United States) Taylor Fritz (second round)
10. (United States) Frances Tiafoe (third round)
11. (Canada) Félix Auger-Aliassime (first round)
12. (United Kingdom) Cameron Norrie (second round)
13. (Croatia) Borna Ćorić (first round)
14. (Italy) Lorenzo Musetti (third round)
15. (Australia) Alex de Minaur (second round)
16. (United States) Tommy Paul (third round)
17. (Poland) Hubert Hurkacz (fourth round)
18. (Argentina) Francisco Cerúndolo (second round)
19. (Germany) Alexander Zverev (third round)
20. (Spain) Roberto Bautista Agut (first round)
21. (Bulgaria) Grigor Dimitrov (fourth round)
22. (United States) Sebastian Korda (first round)
23. (Kazakhstan) Alexander Bublik (fourth round)
24. (Japan) Yoshihito Nishioka (first round)
25. (Chile) Nicolás Jarry (third round)
26. (Canada) Denis Shapovalov (fourth round)
27. (United Kingdom) Dan Evans (first round)
28. (Netherlands) Tallon Griekspoor (first round)
29. (Argentina) Tomás Martín Etcheverry (second round)
30. (Australia) Nick Kyrgios (withdrew)
31. (Spain) Alejandro Davidovich Fokina (third round)
32. (United States) Ben Shelton (second round)

Click on the seed number of a player to go to their draw section.

== Draw ==
Key

- Q = Qualifier
- WC = Wild card
- LL = Lucky loser
- Alt = Alternate
- ITF = ITF entry
- PR = Protected ranking
- SR = Special ranking
- SE = Special exempt
- JE = Junior exempt
- JR = Junior Accelerator Programme entrant
- CO = College Accelerator Programme entrant
- NG = Next Gen Accelerator Program entrant
- w/o = Walkover
- r = Retired
- d = Defaulted

=== Finals ===
Quarterfinals
1	(Spain) Carlos Alcaraz	7^{7}	6	6
6	(Denmark) Holger Rune	6^{3}	4	4
3	Daniil Medvedev	6	1	4	7^{7}	6
(United States) Christopher Eubanks	4	6	6	6^{4}	1
8	(Italy) Jannik Sinner	6	3	6	6
Roman Safiullin	4	6	2	2
7	Andrey Rublev	6	1	4	3
2	(Serbia) Novak Djokovic	4	6	6	6

Semifinals
1	(Spain) Carlos Alcaraz	6	6	6
3	Daniil Medvedev	3	3	3
8	(Italy) Jannik Sinner	3	4	6^{4}
2	(Serbia) Novak Djokovic	6	6	7^{7}

Final
1	(Spain) Carlos Alcaraz	1	7^{8}	6	3	6
2	(Serbia) Novak Djokovic	6	6^{6}	1	6	4

=== Top half ===
==== Section 1 ====
First round
1	(Spain) C Alcaraz	6	6	7
PR	(France) J Chardy	0	2	5
(France) A Müller	7^{7}	1	6	6
(France) A Rinderknech	6^{5}	6	3	4
(Australia) J Kubler	6	4	6	3	6
(France) U Humbert	4	6	2	6	3
(Italy) M Cecchinato	6	2	4	1
25	(Chile) N Jarry	4	6	6	6
19	(Germany) A Zverev	6	7^{7}	7^{7}
Q	(Netherlands) G Brouwer	4	6^{4}	6^{5}
(Switzerland) M-A Hüsler	7^{7}	7	6^{5}	6^{3}	3
LL	(Japan) Y Watanuki	6^{5}	5	7^{7}	7^{7}	6
(Italy) M Berrettini	6^{5}	6	7^{9}	6
(Italy) L Sonego	7^{7}	3	6^{7}	3
Q	(Belgium) K Coppejans	7^{7}	3	3	6^{2}
15	(Australia) A de Minaur	6^{5}	6	6	7^{7}

Second round
1	(Spain) C Alcaraz	6	7^{7}	6
(France) A Müller	4	6^{2}	3
(Australia) J Kubler	5	7	3	4
25	(Chile) N Jarry	7	5	6	6
19	(Germany) A Zverev	6	5	6	6
LL	(Japan) Y Watanuki	4	7	2	2
(Italy) M Berrettini	6	6	6
15	(Australia) A de Minaur	3	4	4

Third round
1	(Spain) C Alcaraz	6	6^{6}	6	7
25	(Chile) N Jarry	3	7^{8}	3	5
19	(Germany) A Zverev	3	6^{4}	6^{5}
(Italy) M Berrettini	6	7^{7}	7^{7}

Fourth round
1	(Spain) C Alcaraz	3	6	6	6
(Italy) M Berrettini	6	3	3	3

==== Section 2 ====
First round
10	(United States) F Tiafoe	7^{7}	6	6
(China) Y Wu	6^{4}	3	4
Q	(Switzerland) D Stricker	3	6	6	4	7
(Australia) A Popyrin	6	3	2	6	5
I Ivashka	4	6	6	6
(Argentina) F Coria	6	4	3	0
Q	(Japan) S Shimabukuro	1	2	1
21	(Bulgaria) G Dimitrov	6	6	6
31	(Spain) A Davidovich Fokina	7^{7}	6	6
WC	(France) A Fils	6^{3}	1	2
(China) Z Zhang	6	6^{3}	6^{6}	6	2
(Netherlands) B van de Zandschulp	2	7^{7}	7^{8}	3	6
Q	(Italy) M Arnaldi	7^{7}	3	4	4
(Spain) R Carballés Baena	6^{0}	6	6	6
WC	(United Kingdom) G Loffhagen	6^{4}	3	2
6	(Denmark) H Rune	7^{7}	6	6

Second round
10	(United States) F Tiafoe	7^{13}	6	6
Q	(Switzerland) D Stricker	6^{11}	4	2
I Ivashka	3	4	4
21	(Bulgaria) G Dimitrov	6	6	6
31	(Spain) A Davidovich Fokina	6	2	6	6
(Netherlands) B van de Zandschulp	1	6	4	3
(Spain) R Carballés Baena	3	6^{3}	4
6	(Denmark) H Rune	6	7^{7}	6

Third round
10	(United States) F Tiafoe	2	3	2
21	(Bulgaria) G Dimitrov	6	6	6
31	(Spain) A Davidovich Fokina	3	6	6	4	6^{8}
6	(Denmark) H Rune	6	4	3	6	7^{10}

Fourth round
21	(Bulgaria) G Dimitrov	6	6^{6}	6^{4}	3
6	(Denmark) H Rune	3	7^{8}	7^{7}	6

==== Section 3 ====
First round
3	D Medvedev	7	6	6
WC	(United Kingdom) A Fery	5	4	3
(France) A Mannarino	6	6	6
A Shevchenko	3	3	2
(United States) M Giron	7^{7}	6	6
PR	(Bolivia) H Dellien	6^{2}	4	4
(Hungary) M Fucsovics	6	6	6
28	(Netherlands) T Griekspoor	4	2	4
18	(Argentina) F Cerúndolo	5	6	6	6
(Portugal) N Borges	7	3	3	4
(Czech Republic) J Lehečka	6	6	6
WC	(Austria) S Ofner	4	4	4
PR	(Canada) M Raonic	6^{5}	6	7^{7}	6
Q	(Austria) D Novak	7^{7}	4	6^{5}	1
Q	(Japan) S Mochizuki	5	3	1
16	(United States) T Paul	7	6	6

Second round
3	D Medvedev	6	6	7^{7}
(France) A Mannarino	3	3	6^{5}
(United States) M Giron	6^{2}	3	6	4
(Hungary) M Fucsovics	7^{7}	6	4	6
18	(Argentina) F Cerúndolo	2	2	2
(Czech Republic) J Lehečka	6	6	6
PR	(Canada) M Raonic	4	6^{4}	7^{7}	4
16	(United States) T Paul	6	7^{7}	6^{4}	6

Third round
3	D Medvedev	4	6	6	6
(Hungary) M Fucsovics	6	3	4	4
(Czech Republic) J Lehečka	6	7^{7}	6^{5}	6^{9}	6
16	(United States) T Paul	2	6^{2}	7^{7}	7^{11}	2

Fourth round
3	D Medvedev	6	6	0
(Czech Republic) J Lehečka	4	2	0^{r}

==== Section 4 ====
First round
12	(United Kingdom) C Norrie	6	4	6	6
Q	(Czech Republic) T Macháč	3	6	1	4
(United States) C Eubanks	4	7	7	6
(Brazil) T Monteiro	6	5	5	3
(Australia) C O'Connell	7	6	4	6
Q	(Serbia) H Medjedovic	5	4	6	4
PR	(Czech Republic) J Veselý	7^{9}	4	6	6
22	(United States) S Korda	6^{7}	6	2	3
32	(United States) B Shelton	6	6	3	4	6
LL	(Japan) T Daniel	4	3	6	6	3
(United States) M Cressy	7^{7}	6^{3}	6^{8}	6^{7}
(Serbia) L Djere	6^{5}	7^{7}	7^{10}	7^{9}
WC	(United Kingdom) R Peniston	3	0	1
(United Kingdom) A Murray	6	6	6
(Austria) D Thiem	6	6^{1}	2	7^{7}	6^{8}
5	(Greece) S Tsitsipas	3	7^{7}	6	6^{5}	7^{10}

Second round
12	(United Kingdom) C Norrie	3	6	2	6^{3}
(United States) C Eubanks	6	3	6	7^{7}
(Australia) C O'Connell	6	7	6
PR	(Czech Republic) J Veselý	3	5	4
32	(United States) B Shelton	6	3	6^{5}	3
(Serbia) L Djere	3	6	7^{7}	6
(United Kingdom) A Murray	6^{3}	7^{7}	6	6^{3}	4
5	(Greece) S Tsitsipas	7^{7}	6^{2}	4	7^{7}	6

Third round
(United States) C Eubanks	7^{7}	7^{7}	7^{7}
(Australia) C O'Connell	6^{5}	6^{3}	6^{2}
(Serbia) L Djere	4	6^{5}	4
5	(Greece) S Tsitsipas	6	7^{7}	6

Fourth round
(United States) C Eubanks	3	7^{7}	3	6	6
5	(Greece) S Tsitsipas	6	6^{4}	6	4	4

=== Bottom half ===
==== Section 5 ====
First round
8	(Italy) J Sinner	6	6	6
(Argentina) JM Cerúndolo	2	2	2
(Serbia) M Kecmanović	0	3	4
(Argentina) D Schwartzman	6	6	6
(Australia) A Vukic	6	7^{7}	3	7
(Germany) D Altmaier	3	6^{1}	6	5
(France) Q Halys	6	6	6^{5}	6
27	(United Kingdom) D Evans	2	3	7^{7}	4
24	(Japan) Y Nishioka	4	3	3
(Colombia) DE Galán	6	6	6
(Germany) D Koepfer	5	3	6^{9}
Q	(Germany) O Otte	7	6	7^{11}
(Sweden) M Ymer	6	6	6
(Slovakia) A Molčan	3	3	4
(Germany) Y Hanfmann	4	6	6	5	3
9	(United States) T Fritz	6	2	4	7	6

Second round
8	(Italy) J Sinner	7	6	6
(Argentina) D Schwartzman	5	1	2
(Australia) A Vukic	3	1	4
(France) Q Halys	6	6	6
(Colombia) DE Galán	6	3	6	7^{7}
Q	(Germany) O Otte	3	6	3	6^{3}
(Sweden) M Ymer	3	2	6	6	6
9	(United States) T Fritz	6	6	3	4	2

Third round
8	(Italy) J Sinner	3	6	6	6
(France) Q Halys	6	2	3	4
(Colombia) DE Galán	6	6^{2}	7^{7}	3	6
(Sweden) M Ymer	2	7^{7}	6^{5}	6	1

Fourth round
8	(Italy) J Sinner	7^{7}	6	6
(Colombia) DE Galán	6^{4}	4	3

==== Section 6 ====
First round
13	(Croatia) B Ćorić	3	5	6	6	1
PR	(Argentina) G Pella	6	7	4	3	6
(France) B Bonzi	3	4	5
Q	(France) H Mayot	6	6	7
(France) C Moutet	6	7	7
(France) R Gasquet	3	5	5
R Safiullin	2	7^{9}	6^{4}	6	7
20	(Spain) R Bautista Agut	6	6^{7}	7^{7}	4	5
26	(Canada) D Shapovalov	5	6	6	6
Q	(Moldova) R Albot	7	4	2	2
PR	(South Africa) L Harris	5	7^{7}	5	3
(France) G Barrère	7	6^{4}	7	6
WC	(United Kingdom) L Broady	6	6	7
(France) C Lestienne	1	3	5
Q	(France) L Lokoli	1	7	4	3
4	(Norway) C Ruud	6	5	6	6

Second round
PR	(Argentina) G Pella	2	6	7^{7}	7
Q	(France) H Mayot	6	3	6^{3}	5
(France) C Moutet	5	3	6^{4}
R Safiullin	7	6	7^{7}
26	(Canada) D Shapovalov	6	6	7^{9}
(France) G Barrère	3	4	6^{7}
WC	(United Kingdom) L Broady	6	3	4	6	6
4	(Norway) C Ruud	4	6	6	3	0

Third round
PR	(Argentina) G Pella	6^{1}	4	0
R Safiullin	7^{7}	6	6
26	(Canada) D Shapovalov	4	6	7	7
WC	(United Kingdom) L Broady	6	2	5	5

Fourth round
R Safiullin	3	6	6	6
26	(Canada) D Shapovalov	6	3	1	3

==== Section 7 ====
First round
7	A Rublev	6	7	6
(Australia) M Purcell	3	5	4
(France) L Van Assche	7^{7}	4	2	4
A Karatsev	6^{4}	6	6	6
(Argentina) S Báez	6^{7}	6	3	6^{2}
Q	(Chile) T Barrios Vera	7^{9}	3	6	7^{7}
WC	(Belgium) D Goffin	6	5	6	6
LL	(Hungary) F Marozsán	2	7	2	0
23	(Kazakhstan) A Bublik	6^{3}	6	6	6
(United States) M McDonald	7^{7}	4	4	4
(United States) JJ Wolf	7	6	7^{7}
Q	(France) E Couacaud	5	3	6^{4}
Q	(Germany) M Marterer	7	6^{8}	6	6
(Croatia) B Gojo	5	7^{10}	3	4
LL	(United States) M Mmoh	7^{7}	6^{4}	7^{7}	6
11	(Canada) F Auger-Aliassime	6^{4}	7^{7}	6^{4}	4

Second round
7	A Rublev	6^{4}	6	6	7
A Karatsev	7^{7}	3	4	5
Q	(Chile) T Barrios Vera	6^{3}	7	2	0
WC	(Belgium) D Goffin	7^{7}	5	6	6
23	(Kazakhstan) A Bublik	6	7^{7}	6
(United States) JJ Wolf	3	6^{5}	0
Q	(Germany) M Marterer	7	7^{7}	6
LL	(United States) M Mmoh	5	6^{5}	4

Third round
7	A Rublev	6	6^{6}	7^{7}	6
WC	(Belgium) D Goffin	3	7^{8}	6^{5}	2
23	(Kazakhstan) A Bublik	6	6	7^{7}
Q	(Germany) M Marterer	4	1	6^{4}

Fourth round
7	A Rublev	7	6	6^{6}	6^{5}	6
23	(Kazakhstan) A Bublik	5	3	7^{8}	7^{7}	4

==== Section 8 ====
First round
14	(Italy) L Musetti	6	6	7
(Peru) JP Varillas	3	1	5
(United States) J Isner	6	3	4	4
(Spain) J Munar	4	6	6	6
WC	(United Kingdom) J Choinski	5	7^{7}	6	6
(Serbia) D Lajović	7	6^{4}	2	2
(Spain) A Ramos Viñolas	1	4	4
17	(Poland) H Hurkacz	6	6	6
29	(Argentina) TM Etcheverry	6^{5}	5	6	6	7
(Spain) B Zapata Miralles	7^{7}	7	3	4	5
(Finland) E Ruusuvuori	5	5	4
(Switzerland) S Wawrinka	7	7	6
(Australia) J Thompson	2	2	6	7^{7}	6
(United States) B Nakashima	6	6	4	6^{4}	3
(Argentina) P Cachin	3	3	6^{4}
2	(Serbia) N Djokovic	6	6	7^{7}

Second round
14	(Italy) L Musetti	6	6	6
(Spain) J Munar	4	3	1
WC	(United Kingdom) J Choinski	4	4	6^{3}
17	(Poland) H Hurkacz	6	6	7^{7}
29	(Argentina) TM Etcheverry	3	6	4	2
(Switzerland) S Wawrinka	6	4	6	6
(Australia) J Thompson	3	6^{4}	5
2	(Serbia) N Djokovic	6	7^{7}	7

Third round
14	(Italy) L Musetti	6^{4}	4	4
17	(Poland) H Hurkacz	7^{7}	6	6
(Switzerland) S Wawrinka	3	1	6^{5}
2	(Serbia) N Djokovic	6	6	7^{7}

Fourth round
17	(Poland) H Hurkacz	6^{6}	6^{6}	7	4
2	(Serbia) N Djokovic	7^{8}	7^{8}	5	6

== Seeded players ==
The following are the seeded players. Seedings are based on ATP rankings as of 26 June 2023. Rankings and points before are as of 3 July 2023.

No ranking points were awarded for the 2022 tournament due to the ban on Russian and Belarusian players. However, because the tournament takes place one week later this year, players are defending points from tournaments that took place during the week of 11 July 2022 (Båstad, Newport, and 2022 ATP Challenger Tour tournaments). Players who are not defending any points from those tournaments will have their 19th-best result (shown in brackets in the table below) replaced with their points from the 2023 Wimbledon Championships.

Seed	Rank	Player	Points before	Points dropping (or 19th-best result)	Points earned	Points after	Status
1	1	(Spain) Carlos Alcaraz	7,675	(0)	2,000	9,675	Champion, defeated (Serbia) Novak Djokovic (2)
2	2	(Serbia) Novak Djokovic	7,595	(0)	1,200	8,795	Runner-up, lost to (Spain) Carlos Alcaraz (1)
3	3	Daniil Medvedev	5,890	(90)	720	6,520	Semifinals lost to (Spain) Carlos Alcaraz (1)
4	4	(Norway) Casper Ruud	4,960	(0)	45	5,005	Second round lost to (United Kingdom) Liam Broady (WC)
5	5	(Greece) Stefanos Tsitsipas	4,670	(0)	180	4,850	Fourth round lost to (United States) Christopher Eubanks
6	6	(Denmark) Holger Rune	4,510	(45)	360	4,825	Quarterfinals lost to (Spain) Carlos Alcaraz (1)
7	7	Andrey Rublev	4,255	90^{†}	360	4,525	Quarterfinals lost to (Serbia) Novak Djokovic (2)
8	8	(Italy) Jannik Sinner	3,345	(90)	720	3,975	Semifinals lost to (Serbia) Novak Djokovic (2)
9	9	(United States) Taylor Fritz	3,310	(45)	45	3,310	Second round lost to (Sweden) Mikael Ymer
10	10	(United States) Frances Tiafoe	3,085	(45)	90	3,130	Third round lost to (Bulgaria) Grigor Dimitrov (21)
11	12	(Canada) Félix Auger-Aliassime	2,760	(0)	10	2,770	First round lost to (United States) Michael Mmoh (LL)
12	13	(United Kingdom) Cameron Norrie	2,610	(45)	45	2,610	Second round lost to (United States) Christopher Eubanks
13	14	(Croatia) Borna Ćorić	2,305	(0)	10	2,315	First round lost to (Argentina) Guido Pella (PR)
14	16	(Italy) Lorenzo Musetti	2,210	(10)	90	2,290	Third round lost to (Poland) Hubert Hurkacz (17)
15	17	(Australia) Alex de Minaur	2,115	(10)	45	2,150	Second round lost to (Italy) Matteo Berrettini
16	15	(United States) Tommy Paul	2,250	(20)	90	2,320	Third round lost to (Czech Republic) Jiří Lehečka
17	18	(Poland) Hubert Hurkacz	2,060	(45)	180	2,195	Fourth round lost to (Serbia) Novak Djokovic (2)
18	19	(Argentina) Francisco Cerúndolo	1,860	250^{†}	45	1,655	Second round lost to (Czech Republic) Jiří Lehečka
19	21	(Germany) Alexander Zverev	1,630	(0)	90	1,720	Third round lost to (Italy) Matteo Berrettini
20	23	(Spain) Roberto Bautista Agut	1,480	(10)	10	1,480	First round lost to Roman Safiullin
21	24	(Bulgaria) Grigor Dimitrov	1,430	(10)	180	1,600	Fourth round lost to (Denmark) Holger Rune (6)
22	25	(United States) Sebastian Korda	1,355	(0)	10	1,365	First round lost to (Czech Republic) Jiří Veselý (PR)
23	26	(Kazakhstan) Alexander Bublik	1,354	150^{†}	180	1,384	Fourth round lost to Andrey Rublev (7)
24	27	(Japan) Yoshihito Nishioka	1,351	30+16^{†}	10+0	1,315	First round lost to (Colombia) Daniel Elahi Galán
25	28	(Chile) Nicolás Jarry	1,336	30^{†}	90	1,396	Third round lost to (Spain) Carlos Alcaraz (1)
26	29	(Canada) Denis Shapovalov	1,335	(0)	180	1,515	Fourth round lost to Roman Safiullin
27	30	(United Kingdom) Dan Evans	1,321	(10)	10	1,321	First round lost to (France) Quentin Halys
28	31	(Netherlands) Tallon Griekspoor	1,254	80^{†}	10	1,184	First round lost to (Hungary) Márton Fucsovics
29	32	(Argentina) Tomás Martín Etcheverry	1,201	(15)	45	1,231	Second round lost to (Switzerland) Stan Wawrinka
~~30~~	~~33~~	(Australia) ~~Nick Kyrgios~~	1,175	(0)	0	1,175	Withdrew due to wrist injury
31	34	(Spain) Alejandro Davidovich Fokina	1,115	20^{†}	90	1,185	Third round lost to (Denmark) Holger Rune (6)
32	36	(United States) Ben Shelton	1,094	54^{†}	45	1,085	Second round lost to (Serbia) Laslo Djere

† The player is defending points from Båstad, Newport, or one or more ATP Challenger Tour events (Porto, Rome, Lüdenscheid or Amersfoort).

=== Withdrawn players ===
The following players would have been seeded, but withdrew before the tournament began.

Rank	Player	Points before	Points dropping (or 19th best result)	Points after	Withdrawal reason
11	Karen Khachanov	3,035	(0)	3,035	Stress fracture
20	(Spain) Pablo Carreño Busta	1,640	90^{†}	1,550	Elbow injury
22	(Germany) Jan-Lennard Struff	1,625	125^{†}	1,500	Hip injury

† The player is defending points from Båstad or Braunschweig.

== Other entry information ==
=== Wild cards ===
- (United Kingdom) Liam Broady
- (United Kingdom) Jan Choinski
- (United Kingdom) Arthur Fery
- (France) Arthur Fils
- (Belgium) David Goffin
- (United Kingdom) George Loffhagen
- (Austria) Sebastian Ofner
- (United Kingdom) Ryan Peniston

=== Protected ranking ===
- (Canada) Milos Raonic (33)
- (South Africa) Lloyd Harris (47)
- (Bolivia) Hugo Dellien (73)
- (Argentina) Guido Pella (75)
- (France) Jérémy Chardy (88)
- (Czech Republic) Jiří Veselý (94)

=== Qualifiers ===
- (Moldova) Radu Albot
- (Italy) Matteo Arnaldi
- (Chile) Tomás Barrios Vera
- (Netherlands) Gijs Brouwer
- (Belgium) Kimmer Coppejans
- (France) Enzo Couacaud
- (France) Laurent Lokoli
- (Czech Republic) Tomáš Macháč
- (Germany) Maximilian Marterer
- (France) Harold Mayot
- (Serbia) Hamad Medjedovic
- (Japan) Shintaro Mochizuki
- (Austria) Dennis Novak
- (Germany) Oscar Otte
- (Japan) Sho Shimabukuro
- (Switzerland) Dominic Stricker

=== Lucky losers ===
- (Japan) Taro Daniel
- (Hungary) Fábián Marozsán
- (United States) Michael Mmoh
- (Japan) Yosuke Watanuki

=== Withdrawals ===
The entry list was released based on the ATP rankings for the week of 22 May 2023.

- ‡ (Spain) Rafael Nadal (15) → replaced by Roman Safiullin (98)
- ‡ (United Kingdom) Jack Draper (60) → replaced by (France) Alexandre Müller (100)
- ‡ (Croatia) Marin Čilić (22) → replaced by (Germany) Dominik Koepfer (102)
- ‡ (Spain) Pablo Carreño Busta (21) → replaced by (Croatia) Borna Gojo (103)
- ‡ Karen Khachanov (11) → replaced by (Argentina) Juan Manuel Cerúndolo (104)
- @ (Germany) Jan-Lennard Struff (26) → replaced by (Japan) Taro Daniel (LL)
- @ (France) Gaël Monfils (35 PR) → replaced by (Japan) Yosuke Watanuki (LL)
- § (Serbia) Filip Krajinović (92) → replaced by (United States) Michael Mmoh (LL)
- § (Australia) Nick Kyrgios (25) → replaced by (Hungary) Fábián Marozsán (LL)

‡ – withdrew from entry list before qualifying began
@ – withdrew from entry list after qualifying began
§ – withdrew from main draw

Preceded by 2023 French Open – Men's singles	Grand Slam men's singles	Succeeded by 2023 US Open – Men's singles
