= 2022 Swedish Open =

- Date: 4–9 July (women); 11–17 July (men)
- Edition: 74th (men); 12th (women)
- Prize money: €534,555 (men) $115,000 (women)
- Surface: Clay
- Venue: Båstad Tennis Stadium

Champions

Men's singles
- (Argentina) Francisco Cerúndolo

Women's singles
- (South Korea) Jang Su-jeong

Men's doubles
- (Brazil) Rafael Matos / (Spain) David Vega Hernández

Women's doubles
- (Japan) Misaki Doi / (Sweden) Rebecca Peterson
- Swedish Open

The 2022 Swedish Open, known as the Nordea Open (for sponsorship reasons), was a professional tennis tournament played on outdoor clay courts as part of the ATP Tour 250 Series of the 2022 ATP Tour and as part of the WTA 125 tournaments. It took place in Båstad, Sweden, from 4 through 9 July 2022 for the women's tournament, and from 11 through 17 July 2022 for the men's tournament. It was the 74th edition of the event for the men and the 12th edition for the women.

== Champions ==
=== Men's singles ===
- (Argentina) Francisco Cerúndolo def. (Argentina) Sebastián Báez, 7–6^{(7–4)}, 6–2

=== Women's singles ===
- (South Korea) Jang Su-jeong def. (Spain) Rebeka Masarova 3–6, 6–3, 6–1

=== Men's doubles ===
- (Brazil) Rafael Matos / (Spain) David Vega Hernández def. (Italy) Simone Bolelli / (Italy) Fabio Fognini, 6–4, 3–6, [13–11]

=== Women's doubles ===
- (Japan) Misaki Doi / (Sweden) Rebecca Peterson def. (Romania) Mihaela Buzărnescu / Irina Khromacheva walkover

== Points and prize money ==
=== Point distribution ===
Event	W	F	SF	QF	Round of 16	Round of 32	Q	Q2	Q1
Men's singles	250	150	90	45	20	0	12	6	0
Men's doubles	250	150	90	45	0	—N/a	—N/a	—N/a	—N/a
Women's singles	160	95	57	29	15	1	—N/a	—N/a	—N/a
Women's doubles	160	95	57	29	1	—N/a	—N/a	—N/a	—N/a

=== Prize money ===
Event	W	F	SF	QF	Round of 16	Round of 32^{1}	Q2	Q1
Men's singles	€81,310	€47,430	€27,885	€16,160	€9,380	€5,730	€2,870	€1,565
Men's doubles *	€28,250	€15,110	€8,860	€4,950	€2,920	—N/a	—N/a	—N/a
Women's singles	$15,000	$8,500	$6,000	$4,000	$2,400	$1,300	—N/a	—N/a
Women's doubles *	$5,000	$2,500	$1,500	$1,250	$1,000	—N/a	—N/a	—N/a

_{^{1} Qualifiers prize money is also the Round of 32 prize money}
_{* per team}

== ATP singles main-draw entrants ==
=== Seeds ===
Country	Player	Rank^{1}	Seed
NOR	Casper Ruud	6	1
	Andrey Rublev	8	2
ARG	Diego Schwartzman	15	3
ESP	Roberto Bautista Agut	19	4
ESP	Pablo Carreño Busta	20	5
GEO	Nikoloz Basilashvili	26	6
DEN	Holger Rune	29	7
ARG	Sebastián Báez	35	8

- ^{1} Rankings are as of 27 June 2022.

=== Other entrants ===
The following players received wildcards into the main draw:

- (Italy) Lorenzo Musetti
- (Switzerland) Stan Wawrinka
- (Sweden) Elias Ymer

The following players received entry using a protected ranking into the main draw:

- (Austria) Dominic Thiem

The following players received entry from the qualifying draw:

- (Argentina) Federico Delbonis
- (Argentina) Tomás Martín Etcheverry
- (Switzerland) Marc-Andrea Hüsler
- (Portugal) Pedro Sousa

The following player received entry as a lucky loser:

- (Italy) Fabio Fognini

=== Withdrawals ===
- (Serbia) Filip Krajinović → replaced by (France) Hugo Gaston
- (Spain) Pedro Martínez → replaced by (Germany) Daniel Altmaier
- (Slovakia) Alex Molčan → replaced by (Serbia) Laslo Đere
- (Germany) Oscar Otte → replaced by (Argentina) Federico Coria
- (France) Arthur Rinderknech → replaced by (Italy) Fabio Fognini

== ATP doubles main-draw entrants ==
=== Seeds ===
Country	Player	Country	Player	Rank^{1}	Seed
IND	Rohan Bopanna	NED	Matwé Middelkoop	47	1
ITA	Simone Bolelli	ITA	Fabio Fognini	57	2
KAZ	Andrey Golubev	ARG	Máximo González	74	3
BRA	Rafael Matos	ESP	David Vega Hernández	82	4

- ^{1} Rankings are as of 27 June 2022.

=== Other entrants ===
The following pairs received wildcards into the doubles main draw:

- (Sweden) Filip Bergevi / (Poland) Łukasz Kubot
- (Sweden) Leo Borg / (Sweden) Elias Ymer

=== Withdrawals ===
Before the tournament

- (Finland) Harri Heliövaara / (Finland) Emil Ruusuvuori → replaced by Aslan Karatsev / (Austria) Philipp Oswald
- (Serbia) Nikola Ćaćić / (Serbia) Filip Krajinović → replaced by (Serbia) Nikola Ćaćić / (Kazakhstan) Aleksandr Nedovyesov
- (Spain) Pedro Martínez / (Spain) Albert Ramos Viñolas → replaced by (Switzerland) Marc-Andrea Hüsler / Pavel Kotov
- (Germany) Kevin Krawietz / (Germany) Andreas Mies → replaced by (Argentina) Francisco Cerúndolo / (Argentina) Tomás Martín Etcheverry

== WTA singles main-draw entrants ==
=== Seeds ===
Country	Player	Rank^{1}	Seed
~~CHN~~	~~Zheng Qinwen~~	~~52~~	~~1~~
SVK	Anna Karolína Schmiedlová	84	2
FRA	Clara Burel	95	3
SWE	Rebecca Peterson	96	4
HUN	Panna Udvardy	100	5
USA	Lauren Davis	102	6
JPN	Misaki Doi	108	7
	Kamilla Rakhimova	109	8

- ^{1} Rankings are as of 27 June 2022.

=== Other entrants ===
The following players received wildcards into the main draw:

- (Sweden) Jacqueline Cabaj Awad
- (Sweden) Caijsa Hennemann
- (Sweden) Kajsa Rinaldo Persson
- (Sweden) Lisa Zaar

The following player received entry using a protected ranking:

- Varvara Flink

The following players received entry as an alternate:

- (Thailand) Peangtarn Plipuech
- (Australia) Olivia Tjandramulia

=== Withdrawals ===
Before the tournament

- (Ukraine) Kateryna Baindl → replaced by (Norway) Malene Helgø
- (Poland) Magdalena Fręch → replaced by (United States) Grace Min
- Anna Kalinskaya → replaced by (South Korea) Jang Su-jeong
- (Poland) Katarzyna Kawa → replaced by (Mexico) Renata Zarazúa
- (Ukraine) Marta Kostyuk → replaced by (Finland) Anastasia Kulikova
- (Montenegro) Danka Kovinić → replaced by (Greece) Valentini Grammatikopoulou
- (Serbia) Aleksandra Krunić → replaced by (Ukraine) Katarina Zavatska
- (United States) Claire Liu → replaced by ~~(United States) Louisa Chirico~~ → replaced by (Thailand) Peangtarn Plipuech
- (Spain) Nuria Párrizas Díaz → replaced by (Turkey) İpek Öz
- (China) Zheng Qinwen → replaced by (Australia) Olivia Tjandramulia

== WTA doubles main-draw entrants ==
=== Seeds ===
Country	Player	Country	Player	Rank^{1}	Seed
JPN	Miyu Kato	INA	Aldila Sutjiadi	163	1
USA	Ingrid Neel	THA	Peangtarn Plipuech	214	2
HUN	Panna Udvardy	CZE	Renata Voráčová	224	3
CZE	Anastasia Dețiuc	CZE	Miriam Kolodziejová	289	4

- ^{1} Rankings are as of 27 June 2022.

=== Other entrants ===
The following pair received a wildcard into the doubles main draw:

- (Sweden) Kajsa Rinaldo Persson / (Sweden) Lisa Zaar
