= 2024 Swedish Open =

- Date: 8–14 July (women); 15–21 July (men)
- Edition: 76th (men); 14th (women)
- Prize money: €579,320 (men)
- Surface: Clay / outdoor
- Venue: Båstad Tennis Stadium

Champions

Men's singles
- (Portugal) Nuno Borges

Women's singles
- (Italy) Martina Trevisan

Men's doubles
- (Brazil) Orlando Luz / (Brazil) Rafael Matos

Women's doubles
- (Thailand) Peangtarn Plipuech / (Chinese Taipei) Tsao Chia-yi
- Swedish Open

The 2024 Swedish Open (also known as the Nordea Open for sponsorship reasons) was a professional tennis tournament played on outdoor clay courts as part of the ATP Tour 250 Series of the 2024 ATP Tour and as part of the 2024 WTA 125 tournaments. It took place in Båstad, Sweden, from 8 through 14 July 2024 for the women's tournament, and from 15 through 21 July 2024 for the men's tournament. It was the 76th edition of the event for the men and the 14th edition for the women.

== Champions ==
=== Men's singles ===
- (Portugal) Nuno Borges def. (Spain) Rafael Nadal, 6–3, 6–2

=== Women's singles ===
- (Italy) Martina Trevisan def. (United States) Ann Li, 6–2, 6–2

=== Men's doubles ===
- (Brazil) Orlando Luz / (Brazil) Rafael Matos def. (France) Manuel Guinard / (France) Grégoire Jacq, 7–5, 6–4

=== Women's doubles ===
- (Thailand) Peangtarn Plipuech / (Chinese Taipei) Tsao Chia-yi def. (Argentina) María Lourdes Carlé / (Argentina) Julia Riera, 7–5, 6–3

== ATP singles main-draw entrants ==
=== Seeds ===
Country	Player	Rank^{1}	Seed
	Andrey Rublev	6	1
NOR	Casper Ruud	8	2
NED	Tallon Griekspoor	27	3
ARG	Mariano Navone	32	4
GBR	Cameron Norrie	42	5
	Roman Safiullin	44	6
POR	Nuno Borges	50	7
	Pavel Kotov	53	8

- ^{1} Rankings are as of 1 July 2024.

=== Other entrants ===
The following players received wildcards into the main draw:

- (Sweden) Leo Borg
- (Spain) Rafael Nadal
- (Sweden) Elias Ymer

The following player received entry under the ATP Next Gen programme for players aged under 20 and ranked in the top 250:

- (Portugal) Henrique Rocha

The following players received entry from the qualifying draw:

- (Croatia) Duje Ajduković
- (Portugal) Jaime Faria
- (Kazakhstan) Timofey Skatov
- (Kazakhstan) Denis Yevseyev

The following player received entry as a lucky loser:

- (Italy) Andrea Pellegrino

=== Withdrawals ===
- (Spain) Roberto Bautista Agut → replaced by (Slovakia) Jozef Kovalík
- (Japan) Kei Nishikori → replaced by (Chile) Cristian Garín
- (Italy) Francesco Passaro → replaced by (Italy) Andrea Pellegrino
- (Italy) Jannik Sinner → replaced by (Argentina) Camilo Ugo Carabelli

== ATP doubles main-draw entrants ==
=== Seeds ===
Country	Player	Country	Player	Rank^{1}	Seed
ECU	Gonzalo Escobar	KAZ	Aleksandr Nedovyesov	95	1
ARG	Guido Andreozzi	MEX	Miguel Ángel Reyes-Varela	142	2
BRA	Orlando Luz	BRA	Rafael Matos	154	3
BRA	Fernando Romboli	BRA	Marcelo Zormann	188	4

- ^{1} Rankings are as of 1 July 2024.

=== Other entrants ===
The following pairs received wildcards into the doubles main draw:

- (Sweden) Leo Borg / (Sweden) William Rejchtman Vinciguerra
- (Spain) Rafael Nadal / (Norway) Casper Ruud

=== Withdrawals ===
- (France) Théo Arribagé / (France) Sadio Doumbia → replaced by (France) Théo Arribagé / Roman Safiullin
- (Poland) Karol Drzewiecki / (Poland) Jan Zieliński → replaced by (Poland) Karol Drzewiecki / (India) Sumit Nagal
- (France) Jonathan Eysseric / (France) Alexandre Müller → replaced by (France) Alexandre Müller / (France) Luca Van Assche
- (Brazil) Orlando Luz / (Brazil) Thiago Monteiro → replaced by (Brazil) Orlando Luz / (Brazil) Rafael Matos
- (United Kingdom) Joe Salisbury / (United Kingdom) Neal Skupski → replaced by (South Korea) Nam Ji-sung / (Finland) Patrik Niklas-Salminen

== WTA singles main-draw entrants ==
=== Seeds ===
Country	Player	Rank^{1}	Seed
FRA	Diane Parry	53	1
ROU	Jaqueline Cristian	62	2
GER	Tamara Korpatsch	73	3
SVK	Anna Karolína Schmiedlová	74	4
~~USA~~	~~Taylor Townsend~~	~~76~~	~~5~~
ARG	María Lourdes Carlé	87	6
ITA	Martina Trevisan	89	7
MEX	Renata Zarazúa	98	8
	Kamilla Rakhimova	104	9

- ^{1} Rankings are as of 1 July 2024.

=== Other entrants ===
The following players received wildcards into the main draw:

- (Sweden) Mirjam Björklund
- (Sweden) Caijsa Hennemann
- (Sweden) Kajsa Rinaldo Persson
- (Sweden) Nellie Taraba Wallberg

The following players received entry as alternates:

- (Romania) Irina Bara
- (Ukraine) Anastasiya Soboleva

=== Withdrawals ===
Before the tournament

- (Romania) Elena-Gabriela Ruse → replaced by (Ukraine) Anastasiya Soboleva
- (United States) Taylor Townsend → replaced by (Romania) Irina Bara

== WTA doubles main-draw entrants ==
=== Seeds ===
Country	Player	Country	Player	Rank^{1}	Seed
	Amina Anshba	CZE	Anastasia Dețiuc	152	1
USA	Sabrina Santamaria	MEX	Renata Zarazúa	250	2
USA	Quinn Gleason	UKR	Yuliia Starodubtseva	276	3
THA	Peangtarn Plipuech	TPE	Tsao Chia-yi	282	4

- ^{1} Rankings are as of 1 July 2024.

=== Other entrants ===
The following pair received a wildcard into the doubles main draw:

- (Sweden) Linea Bajraliu / (Sweden) Nellie Taraba Wallberg
