= 2023 Swedish Open – Men's singles =

Men's singles
- 2023 Swedish Open

Final
- Champion: Andrey Rublev
- Runner-up: (Norway) Casper Ruud
- Score: 7–6^{(7–3)}, 6–0

Details
- Draw: 28
- Seeds: 8

Events
Singles	men	women
Doubles	men	women
← 2022 ·	Swedish Open	· 2024 →

Andrey Rublev defeated Casper Ruud in the final, 7–6^{(7–3)}, 6–0, to win the men's singles tennis title at the 2023 Swedish Open.

Francisco Cerúndolo was the defending champion, but lost in the semifinals to Rublev.

== Seeds ==
The top four seeds received a bye into the second round.

1. (Norway) Casper Ruud (final)
2. Andrey Rublev (champion)
3. (Italy) Lorenzo Musetti (semifinals)
4. (Argentina) Francisco Cerúndolo (semifinals)
5. (Germany) Alexander Zverev (quarterfinals)
6. (Argentina) Tomás Martín Etcheverry (first round)
7. (Spain) Alejandro Davidovich Fokina (first round)
8. (Argentina) Sebastián Báez (first round)

== Draw ==
=== Key ===
- Q = Qualifier
- WC = Wild card
- LL = Lucky loser
- Alt = Alternate
- ITF = ITF entry
- PR = Protected ranking
- SR = Special ranking
- SE = Special exempt
- JE = Junior exempt
- JR = Junior Accelerator Programme entrant
- CO = College Accelerator Programme entrant
- NG = Next Gen Accelerator Program entrant
- w/o = Walkover
- r = Retired
- d = Defaulted

=== Finals ===
Semifinals
1	(Norway) Casper Ruud	6	7
3	(Italy) Lorenzo Musetti	3	5
4	(Argentina) Francisco Cerúndolo	6^{6}	7^{9}	3
2	Andrey Rublev	7^{8}	6^{7}	6

Final
1	(Norway) Casper Ruud	6^{3}	0
2	Andrey Rublev	7^{7}	6

=== Top half ===
First round
(Argentina) JM Cerúndolo	3	3
A Shevchenko	6	6
Q	(Bolivia) H Dellien	3	6^{3}
(Spain) B Zapata Miralles	6	7^{7}
(Austria) S Ofner	4	6	7
6	(Argentina) TM Etcheverry	6	1	5
(Italy) M Arnaldi	6	2	7^{7}
(Finland) E Ruusuvuori	4	6	6^{0}
(Serbia) D Lajović	6^{4}	6^{4}
Q	(Austria) F Misolic	7^{7}	7^{7}
Q	(Slovakia) J Kovalík	6	6
7	(Spain) A Davidovich Fokina	3	4

Second round
1	(Norway) C Ruud	6	6
A Shevchenko	2	4
(Spain) B Zapata Miralles	6	4	4
(Austria) S Ofner	4	6	6
3	(Italy) L Musetti	6	4	7^{8}
(Italy) M Arnaldi	3	6	6^{6}
Q	(Austria) F Misolic	4	7^{8}	6
Q	(Slovakia) J Kovalík	6	6^{6}	4

Quarterfinals
1	(Norway) C Ruud	6	6
(Austria) S Ofner	3	4
3	(Italy) L Musetti	4	6	6
Q	(Austria) F Misolic	6	1	2

Semifinals
1	(Norway) C Ruud	6	7
3	(Italy) L Musetti	3	5

=== Bottom half ===
First round
8	(Argentina) S Báez	4	6	6^{5}
(Argentina) F Coria	6	4	7^{7}
WC	(Sweden) E Ymer	6^{5}	3
WC	(Sweden) L Borg	7^{7}	6
WC	(Sweden) DN Mădăraș	6^{2}	4
(France) L Van Assche	7^{7}	6
5	(Germany) A Zverev	6	3	7
(Slovakia) A Molčan	4	6	5
(Brazil) T Monteiro	5	6	6
(Colombia) DE Galán	7	4	4
(Italy) M Cecchinato	1	2
Q	P Kotov	6	6

Second round
(Argentina) F Coria	6	6
WC	(Sweden) L Borg	4	2
(France) L Van Assche	2	3
4	(Argentina) F Cerúndolo	6	6
5	(Germany) A Zverev	6	6
(Brazil) T Monteiro	1	0
Q	P Kotov	3	6^{4}
2	A Rublev	6	7^{7}

Quarterfinals
(Argentina) F Coria	3	3
4	(Argentina) F Cerúndolo	6	6
5	(Germany) A Zverev	2	3
2	A Rublev	6	6

Semifinals
4	(Argentina) F Cerúndolo	6^{6}	7^{9}	3
2	A Rublev	7^{8}	6^{7}	6

== Qualifying ==
=== Seeds ===
1. Pavel Kotov (qualified)
2. (Italy) Andrea Vavassori (first round)
3. (Kazakhstan) Timofey Skatov (qualifying competition)
4. (Austria) Filip Misolic (qualified)
5. (Italy) Francesco Maestrelli (first round)
6. (Slovakia) Jozef Kovalík (qualified)
7. (Italy) Luca Nardi (first round)
8. (France) Enzo Couacaud (qualifying competition)

=== Qualifiers ===
1. Pavel Kotov
2. (Slovakia) Jozef Kovalík
3. (Bolivia) Hugo Dellien
4. (Austria) Filip Misolic

=== Qualifying draw ===
==== First qualifier ====
First round
1	Pavel Kotov	6	6
WC	(Sweden) Max Dahlin	4	4
(Argentina) Andrea Collarini	6^{7}	6^{2}
8	(France) Enzo Couacaud	7^{9}	7^{7}

Qualifying competition
1	Pavel Kotov	6	5	6
8	(France) Enzo Couacaud	4	7	3

==== Second qualifier ====
First round
2	(Italy) Andrea Vavassori	4	6	3
(Argentina) Genaro Alberto Olivieri	6	3	6
Alt	(Norway) Viktor Durasovic	4	5
6	(Slovakia) Jozef Kovalík	6	7

Qualifying competition
(Argentina) Genaro Alberto Olivieri	6^{5}	4
6	(Slovakia) Jozef Kovalík	7^{7}	6

==== Third qualifier ====
First round
3	(Kazakhstan) Timofey Skatov	6	6
Alt	(Kazakhstan) Denis Yevseyev	1	3
(Bolivia) Hugo Dellien	5	7^{7}	6
7	(Italy) Luca Nardi	7	6^{4}	3

Qualifying competition
3	(Kazakhstan) Timofey Skatov	5	6	3
(Bolivia) Hugo Dellien	7	3	6

==== Fourth qualifier ====
First round
4	(Austria) Filip Misolic	0	6	6
WC	(Sweden) Karl Friberg	6	1	4
(Bosnia and Herzegovina) Damir Džumhur	6	2	7^{7}
5	(Italy) Francesco Maestrelli	4	6	6^{5}

Qualifying competition
4	(Austria) Filip Misolic	w/o
(Bosnia and Herzegovina) Damir Džumhur
