= 2022 Swedish Open – Women's doubles =

Women's doubles
- 2022 Swedish Open

Final
- Champions: (Japan) Misaki Doi (Sweden) Rebecca Peterson
- Runners-up: (Romania) Mihaela Buzărnescu; Irina Khromacheva
- Score: Walkover

Events
Singles	men	women
Doubles	men	women
← 2021 ·	Swedish Open	· 2023 →

Misaki Doi and Rebecca Peterson won the women's doubles tennis title at the 2022 Swedish Open after Mihaela Buzărnescu and Irina Khromacheva withdrew from the final, due to Buzărnescu's knee injury.

Mirjam Björklund and Leonie Küng were the reigning champions, but chose not to participate.

== Seeds ==
1. (Japan) Miyu Kato / (Indonesia) Aldila Sutjiadi (quarterfinals)
2. (United States) Ingrid Neel / (Thailand) Peangtarn Plipuech (quarterfinals)
3. (Hungary) Panna Udvardy / (Czech Republic) Renata Voráčová (first round)
4. (Greece) Valentini Grammatikopoulou / (France) Elixane Lechemia (quarterfinals)

== Draw ==
=== Key ===
- Q = Qualifier
- WC = Wild card
- LL = Lucky loser
- Alt = Alternate
- SE = Special exempt
- PR = Protected ranking
- ITF = ITF entry
- JE = Junior exempt
- w/o = Walkover
- r = Retired
- d = Defaulted
- SR = Special ranking

=== Draw ===
First round
1	(Japan) M Kato (Indonesia) A Sutjiadi	4	6	[10]
(South Korea) S-j Jang (China) Jin Lu	6	4	[4]
(Indonesia) J Rompies (Australia) O Tjandramulia	6	7
(United States) L Davis (China) Y Yuan	1	5
4	(Greece) V Grammatikopoulou (France) E Lechemia	6	6
(Czech Republic) A Dețiuc (Czech Republic) M Kolodziejová	0	2
(Spain) R Masarova (Mexico) R Zarazúa	1	1
(Romania) M Buzărnescu; I Khromacheva	6	6
A Gabueva; A Zakharova	6	7^{7}
(France) C Burel (France) L Jeanjean	3	6^{2}
E Avanesyan (Sweden) C Hennemann	7	6
3	(Hungary) P Udvardy (Czech Republic) R Voráčová	5	3
(Japan) M Doi (Sweden) R Peterson	6	6
(Indonesia) B Gumulya (Chinese Taipei) Y-c Hsieh	2	4
WC	(Sweden) K Rinaldo Persson (Sweden) L Zaar	3	6	[4]
2	(United States) I Neel (Thailand) P Plipuech	6	1	[10]

Quarterfinals
1	(Japan) M Kato (Indonesia) A Sutjiadi	6	3	[6]
(Indonesia) J Rompies (Australia) O Tjandramulia	2	6	[10]
4	(Greece) V Grammatikopoulou (France) E Lechemia	4	6^{3}
(Romania) M Buzărnescu; I Khromacheva	6	7^{7}
A Gabueva; A Zakharova	4	2
E Avanesyan (Sweden) C Hennemann	6	6
(Japan) M Doi (Sweden) R Peterson	6	6
2	(United States) I Neel (Thailand) P Plipuech	4	1

Semifinals
(Indonesia) J Rompies (Australia) O Tjandramulia	2	1
(Romania) M Buzărnescu; I Khromacheva	6	6
E Avanesyan (Sweden) C Hennemann	3	3
(Japan) M Doi (Sweden) R Peterson	6	6

Final
(Romania) M Buzărnescu; I Khromacheva
(Japan) M Doi (Sweden) R Peterson	w/o
