= 2025 Swedish Open – Men's doubles =

Men's doubles
- 2025 Swedish Open

Final
- Champions: (Argentina) Guido Andreozzi (Netherlands) Sander Arends
- Runners-up: (Czech Republic) Adam Pavlásek (Poland) Jan Zieliński
- Score: 6–7^{(4–7)}, 7–5, [10–6]

Events
Singles	men	women
Doubles	men	women
- Swedish Open

Guido Andreozzi and Sander Arends defeated Adam Pavlásek and Jan Zieliński in the final, 6–7^{(4–7)}, 7–5, [10–6] to win the men's doubles tennis title at the 2025 Swedish Open. It was Andreozzi's third ATP Tour title and Arends' fifth.

Orlando Luz and Rafael Matos were the reigning champions, but chose not to compete together. Luz partnered André Göransson, but lost in the semifinals to Andreozzi and Arends. Matos partnered Marcelo Melo, but lost in the quarterfinals to Andreozzi and Arends.

== Seeds ==
1. (Argentina) Guido Andreozzi / (Netherlands) Sander Arends (champions)
2. (Monaco) Romain Arneodo / (France) Manuel Guinard (quarterfinals)
3. (Sweden) André Göransson / (Brazil) Orlando Luz (semifinals)
4. (Czech Republic) Adam Pavlásek / (Poland) Jan Zieliński (final)

== Draw ==
Key

- Q = Qualifier
- WC = Wild card
- LL = Lucky loser
- Alt = Alternate
- ITF = ITF entry
- PR = Protected ranking
- SR = Special ranking
- SE = Special exempt
- JE = Junior exempt
- JR = Junior Accelerator Programme entrant
- CO = College Accelerator Programme entrant
- NG = Next Gen Accelerator Program entrant
- w/o = Walkover
- r = Retired
- d = Defaulted

=== Draw ===
First round
1	(Argentina) G Andreozzi (Netherlands) S Arends	6	6
PR	(Argentina) G Durán (Argentina) C Ugo Carabelli	3	4
(Brazil) R Matos (Brazil) M Melo	7	7
(Canada) C Harper (United States) R Seggerman	5	5
3	(Sweden) A Göransson (Brazil) O Luz	6	5	[10]
(Netherlands) T Griekspoor (Netherlands) B van de Zandschulp	4	7	[4]
(United States) V Kirkov (Netherlands) B Stevens	7	7
Alt	(United States) G Goldhoff (France) G Jacq	5	5
(Uruguay) A Behar (Belgium) J Vliegen	6	3	[10]
(Croatia) I Dodig (United Kingdom) J Murray	2	6	[5]
(Netherlands) J de Jong (Belgium) S Gillé	4	6	[10]
4	(Czech Republic) A Pavlásek (Poland) J Zieliński	6	4	[12]
WC	(Sweden) O Wallin (Sweden) E Ymer	3	3
(France) T Arribagé (Chile) T Barrios Vera	6	6
WC	(Sweden) E Grevelius (Sweden) A Heinonen	6^{1}	2
2	(Monaco) R Arneodo (France) M Guinard	7^{7}	6

Quarterfinals
1	(Argentina) G Andreozzi (Netherlands) S Arends	6	6
(Brazil) R Matos (Brazil) M Melo	4	4
3	(Sweden) A Göransson (Brazil) O Luz	6	6
(United States) V Kirkov (Netherlands) B Stevens	2	4
(Uruguay) A Behar (Belgium) J Vliegen	6	4	[4]
4	(Czech Republic) A Pavlásek (Poland) J Zieliński	0	6	[10]
(France) T Arribagé (Chile) T Barrios Vera	6	6
2	(Monaco) R Arneodo (France) M Guinard	4	4

Semifinals
1	(Argentina) G Andreozzi (Netherlands) S Arends	6	6
3	(Sweden) A Göransson (Brazil) O Luz	3	4
4	(Czech Republic) A Pavlásek (Poland) J Zieliński	6	3	[10]
(France) T Arribagé (Chile) T Barrios Vera	3	6	[7]

Final
1	(Argentina) G Andreozzi (Netherlands) S Arends	6^{4}	7	[10]
4	(Czech Republic) A Pavlásek (Poland) J Zieliński	7^{7}	5	[6]
