= 2025 Swedish Open – Women's doubles =

Women's doubles
- 2025 Swedish Open

Final
- Champions: (Czech Republic) Jesika Malečková (Czech Republic) Miriam Škoch
- Runners-up: (Spain) Irene Burillo (Turkey) Berfu Cengiz
- Score: 6–4, 6–3

Events
Singles	men	women
Doubles	men	women
- Swedish Open

Jesika Malečková and Miriam Škoch won the title, defeating Irene Burillo and Berfu Cengiz in the final, 6–4, 6–3.

Peangtarn Plipuech and Tsao Chia-yi were the reigning champions, but chose not to defend their title.

== Seeds ==
1. (Japan) Makoto Ninomiya / (Japan) Moyuka Uchijima (quarterfinals)
2. (Czech Republic) Jesika Malečková / (Czech Republic) Miriam Škoch (champions)
3. (Czech Republic) Anastasia Dețiuc / (Latvia) Darja Semeņistaja (quarterfinals)
4. (United States) Jessie Aney / (United States) Jessica Failla (semifinals)

== Draw ==
Key

- Q = Qualifier
- WC = Wild card
- LL = Lucky loser
- Alt = Alternate
- ITF = ITF entry
- PR = Protected ranking
- SR = Special ranking
- SE = Special exempt
- JE = Junior exempt
- JR = Junior Accelerator Programme entrant
- CO = College Accelerator Programme entrant
- NG = Next Gen Accelerator Program entrant
- w/o = Walkover
- r = Retired
- d = Defaulted

=== Draw ===
First round
1	(Japan) M Ninomiya (Japan) M Uchijima	6	6
(Ukraine) M Kolb (Ukraine) N Kolb	2	2
(Spain) I Burillo (Turkey) B Cengiz	7	6
(Sweden) L Bajraliu (Sweden) B Bergkvist Larsson	5	3
3	(Czech Republic) A Dețiuc (Latvia) D Semeņistaja	6	6
(Bosnia and Herzegovina) A Wagner (Belgium) K Zimmermann	4	2
(Chinese Taipei) I-h Cho (Chinese Taipei) Y-t Cho	6	6
(Germany) A Fomina-Klotz; E Makarova	3	4
(Japan) N Hibino; E Yashina	6	6
(India) R Bhosale (China) S Feng	2	2
(Algeria) I Ibbou (Switzerland) N Karamoko	4	1
4	(United States) J Aney (United States) J Failla	6	6
(Sweden) C Hennemann (Sweden) L Zaar	6	4	[10]
(Sweden) J Björk (Sweden) I Johansson	4	6	[12]
(Lithuania) J Mikulskytė (Australia) A Sharma	0	3
2	(Czech Republic) J Malečková (Czech Republic) M Škoch	6	6

Quarterfinals
1	(Japan) M Ninomiya (Japan) M Uchijima	4	6	[6]
(Spain) I Burillo (Turkey) B Cengiz	6	2	[10]
3	(Czech Republic) A Dețiuc (Latvia) D Semeņistaja	6	4	[11]
(Chinese Taipei) I-h Cho (Chinese Taipei) Y-t Cho	3	6	[13]
(Japan) N Hibino; E Yashina	6^{7}	2
4	(United States) J Aney (United States) J Failla	7^{9}	6
(Sweden) J Björk (Sweden) I Johansson	1	6	[2]
2	(Czech Republic) J Malečková (Czech Republic) M Škoch	6	3	[10]

Semifinals
(Spain) I Burillo (Turkey) B Cengiz	6	6
(Chinese Taipei) I-h Cho (Chinese Taipei) Y-t Cho	2	1
4	(United States) J Aney (United States) J Failla	2	1
2	(Czech Republic) J Malečková (Czech Republic) M Škoch	6	6

Final
(Spain) I Burillo (Turkey) B Cengiz	4	3
2	(Czech Republic) J Malečková (Czech Republic) M Škoch	6	6
