= 2025 Swedish Open – Men's singles =

Men's singles
- 2025 Swedish Open

Final
- Champion: (Italy) Luciano Darderi
- Runner-up: (Netherlands) Jesper de Jong
- Score: 6–4, 3–6, 6–3

Details
- Draw: 28
- Seeds: 8

Events
Singles	men	women
Doubles	men	women
- Swedish Open

Luciano Darderi defeated Jesper de Jong in the final, 6–4, 3–6, 6–3 to win the men's singles tennis title at the 2025 Swedish Open. It was his third career ATP Tour title.

Nuno Borges was the defending champion, but lost in the second round to Filip Misolic.

== Seeds ==
The top four seeds received a bye into the second round.

1. (Argentina) Francisco Cerúndolo (semifinals)
2. (Netherlands) Tallon Griekspoor (quarterfinals)
3. (Portugal) Nuno Borges (second round)
4. (Argentina) Sebastián Báez (quarterfinals)
5. (Argentina) Camilo Ugo Carabelli (semifinals)
6. (Italy) Luciano Darderi (champion)
7. (Bosnia and Herzegovina) Damir Džumhur (quarterfinals)
8. (Czech Republic) Vít Kopřiva (second round)

== Draw ==
Key

- Q = Qualifier
- WC = Wild card
- LL = Lucky loser
- Alt = Alternate
- ITF = ITF entry
- PR = Protected ranking
- SR = Special ranking
- SE = Special exempt
- JE = Junior exempt
- JR = Junior Accelerator Programme entrant
- CO = College Accelerator Programme entrant
- NG = Next Gen Accelerator Program entrant
- w/o = Walkover
- r = Retired
- d = Defaulted

=== Finals ===
Semifinals
1	(Argentina) Francisco Cerúndolo	2	6	6^{3}
6	(Italy) Luciano Darderi	6	3	7^{7}
5	(Argentina) Camilo Ugo Carabelli	3	6^{3}
(Netherlands) Jesper de Jong	6	7^{7}

Final
6	(Italy) Luciano Darderi	6	3	6
(Netherlands) Jesper de Jong	4	6	3

=== Top half ===
First round
(Chile) T Barrios Vera	5	5
(Argentina) M Navone	7	7
(France) H Gaston	6	6
(Chinese Taipei) C-h Tseng	4	3
(Austria) S Ofner	4	4
7	(Bosnia and Herzegovina) D Džumhur	6	6
Q	(Brazil) T Monteiro	7	3	6^{2}
Q	(Norway) N Budkov Kjær	5	6	7^{7}
WC	(Sweden) E Ymer	6	3	6
(United States) T Boyer	3	6	2
(Belgium) R Collignon	2	6	2
6	(Italy) L Darderi	6	2	6

Second round
1	(Argentina) F Cerúndolo	6	6
(Argentina) M Navone	3	3
(France) H Gaston	6	2	2
7	(Bosnia and Herzegovina) D Džumhur	4	6	6
4	(Argentina) S Báez	3	6	7
Q	(Norway) N Budkov Kjær	6	2	5
WC	(Sweden) E Ymer	2	2
6	(Italy) L Darderi	6	6

Quarterfinals
1	(Argentina) F Cerúndolo	6	3	6
7	(Bosnia and Herzegovina) D Džumhur	0	6	3
4	(Argentina) S Báez	0	2
6	(Italy) L Darderi	6	6

Semifinals
1	(Argentina) F Cerúndolo	2	6	6^{3}
6	(Italy) L Darderi	6	3	7^{7}

=== Bottom half ===
First round
5	(Argentina) C Ugo Carabelli	6	6
(Chile) C Garín	4	4
WC	(Sweden) M Ymer	4	1
(Netherlands) B van de Zandschulp	6	6
Q	(Austria) F Misolic	6	3	7
(Denmark) E Møller	3	6	5
8	(Czech Republic) V Kopřiva	6	3
(Bolivia) H Dellien	1	0^{r}
WC	(Sweden) W Rejchtman Vinciguerra	3	2
(Netherlands) J de Jong	6	6
Q	(Italy) A Pellegrino	2	6	6
(Portugal) J Faria	6	3	3

Second round
5	(Argentina) C Ugo Carabelli	7^{7}	5	6
(Netherlands) B van de Zandschulp	6^{3}	7	3
Q	(Austria) F Misolic	3	7^{7}	6
3	(Portugal) N Borges	6	6^{1}	3
8	(Czech Republic) V Kopřiva	6^{3}	5
(Netherlands) J de Jong	7^{7}	7
Q	(Italy) A Pellegrino	6	6^{6}	3
2	(Netherlands) T Griekspoor	4	7^{8}	6

Quarterfinals
5	(Argentina) C Ugo Carabelli	6	7
Q	(Austria) F Misolic	3	5
(Netherlands) J de Jong	4	7^{7}	6
2	(Netherlands) T Griekspoor	6	6^{3}	3

Semifinals
5	(Argentina) C Ugo Carabelli	3	6^{3}
(Netherlands) J de Jong	6	7^{7}

== Qualifying ==
=== Seeds ===
1. (Austria) Filip Misolic (qualified)
2. (Brazil) Thiago Seyboth Wild (first round)
3. (Italy) Andrea Pellegrino (qualified)
4. (Lithuania) Vilius Gaubas (qualifying competition)
5. (Brazil) Thiago Monteiro (qualified)
6. (France) Luca Van Assche (first round)
7. (Kazakhstan) Timofey Skatov (qualifying competition)
8. (Norway) Viktor Durasovic (first round)

=== Qualifiers ===
1. (Austria) Filip Misolic
2. (Norway) Nicolai Budkov Kjær
3. (Italy) Andrea Pellegrino
4. (Brazil) Thiago Monteiro

=== Qualifying draw ===
==== First qualifier ====
First round
1	(Austria) Filip Misolic	6	6
(Moldova) Radu Albot	4	3
WC	(Sweden) Olle Wallin	3	7^{8}	7^{7}
8	(Norway) Viktor Durasovic	6	6^{6}	6^{4}

Qualifying competition
1	(Austria) Filip Misolic	7^{7}	6
WC	(Sweden) Olle Wallin	6^{2}	2

==== Second qualifier ====
First round
2	(Brazil) Thiago Seyboth Wild	3	4
Alt	(Norway) Nicolai Budkov Kjær	6	6
PR	(Spain) Pablo Llamas Ruiz	6	6
6	(France) Luca Van Assche	3	0

Qualifying competition
Alt	(Norway) Nicolai Budkov Kjær	3	7^{7}	6
PR	(Spain) Pablo Llamas Ruiz	6	6^{4}	3

==== Third qualifier ====
First round
3	(Italy) Andrea Pellegrino	6	6^{3}	6
(Poland) Daniel Michalski	3	7^{7}	2
(India) Sumit Nagal	2	4
7	(Kazakhstan) Timofey Skatov	6	6

Qualifying competition
3	(Italy) Andrea Pellegrino	6	6
7	(Kazakhstan) Timofey Skatov	3	2

==== Fourth qualifier ====
First round
4	(Lithuania) Vilius Gaubas	6	6
WC	(Sweden) Ludvig Fredrik Hede	1	2
(Slovakia) Andrej Martin	5	1
5	(Brazil) Thiago Monteiro	7	6

Qualifying competition
4	(Lithuania) Vilius Gaubas	6	2	3
5	(Brazil) Thiago Monteiro	1	6	6
