= 2022 Swedish Open – Men's doubles =

Men's doubles
- 2022 Swedish Open

Final
- Champions: (Brazil) Rafael Matos (Spain) David Vega Hernández
- Runners-up: (Italy) Simone Bolelli (Italy) Fabio Fognini
- Score: 6–4, 3–6, [13–11]

Events
Singles	men	women
Doubles	men	women
← 2021 ·	Swedish Open	· 2023 →

Rafael Matos and David Vega Hernández defeated Simone Bolelli and Fabio Fognini in the final, 6–4, 3–6, [13–11] to win the men's doubles tennis title at the 2022 Swedish Open. They saved a championship point en route to their third title together of the season.

Sander Arends and David Pel were the reigning champions, but chose not to defend their title.

== Seeds ==
1. (India) Rohan Bopanna / (Netherlands) Matwé Middelkoop (first round)
2. (Italy) Simone Bolelli / (Italy) Fabio Fognini (final)
3. (Kazakhstan) Andrey Golubev / (Argentina) Máximo González (first round)
4. (Brazil) Rafael Matos / (Spain) David Vega Hernández (champions)

== Draw ==
=== Key ===
- Q = Qualifier
- WC = Wild card
- LL = Lucky loser
- Alt = Alternate
- SE = Special exempt
- PR = Protected ranking
- ITF = ITF entry
- JE = Junior exempt
- w/o = Walkover
- r = Retired
- d = Defaulted
- SR = Special ranking

=== Draw ===
First round
1	(India) R Bopanna (Netherlands) M Middelkoop	6^{3}	3
PR	(France) F Martin (Croatia) F Škugor	7^{7}	6
(Sweden) A Göransson (Japan) B McLachlan	3	4
Alt	(Argentina) F Cerúndolo (Argentina) TM Etcheverry	6	6
4	(Brazil) R Matos (Spain) D Vega Hernández	7	6
WC	(Sweden) F Bergevi (Poland) Ł Kubot	5	1
(Belgium) S Gillé (Belgium) J Vliegen	4	4
(Argentina) A Molteni (Monaco) H Nys	6	6
Alt	(Switzerland) M-A Hüsler; P Kotov	6	6
WC	(Sweden) L Borg (Sweden) E Ymer	1	4
(Serbia) N Ćaćić (Kazakhstan) A Nedovyesov	6	6
3	(Kazakhstan) A Golubev (Argentina) M González	3	4
(Spain) P Carreño Busta (Portugal) J Sousa	7^{7}	7^{7}
A Karatsev (Austria) P Oswald	6^{3}	6^{5}
(Uruguay) A Behar (Bosnia and Herzegovina) T Brkić	6^{3}	6	[6]
2	(Italy) S Bolelli (Italy) F Fognini	7^{7}	2	[10]

Quarterfinals
PR	(France) F Martin (Croatia) F Škugor	4	2
Alt	(Argentina) F Cerúndolo (Argentina) TM Etcheverry	6	6
4	(Brazil) R Matos (Spain) D Vega Hernández	7	5	[10]
(Argentina) A Molteni (Monaco) H Nys	5	7	[8]
Alt	(Switzerland) M-A Hüsler; P Kotov	6	2	[3]
(Serbia) N Ćaćić (Kazakhstan) A Nedovyesov	4	6	[10]
(Spain) P Carreño Busta (Portugal) J Sousa	4	1
2	(Italy) S Bolelli (Italy) F Fognini	6	6

Semifinals
Alt	(Argentina) F Cerúndolo (Argentina) TM Etcheverry	1	7^{7}	[7]
4	(Brazil) R Matos (Spain) D Vega Hernández	6	6^{1}	[10]
(Serbia) N Ćaćić (Kazakhstan) A Nedovyesov	7	4	[7]
2	(Italy) S Bolelli (Italy) F Fognini	5	6	[10]

Final
4	(Brazil) R Matos (Spain) D Vega Hernández	6	3	[13]
2	(Italy) S Bolelli (Italy) F Fognini	4	6	[11]
