= 2023 Swedish Open – Women's doubles =

Women's doubles
- 2023 Swedish Open

Final
- Champions: Irina Khromacheva (Hungary) Panna Udvardy
- Runners-up: (Japan) Eri Hozumi (South Korea) Jang Su-jeong
- Score: 4–6, 6–3, [10–5]

Events
Singles	men	women
Doubles	men	women
← 2022 ·	Swedish Open	· 2024 →

Misaki Doi and Rebecca Peterson were the reigning champions, but chose not to participate this year.

Irina Khromacheva and Panna Udvardy won the title, defeating Eri Hozumi and Jang Su-jeong in the final, 4–6, 6–3, [10–5].

== Seeds ==
1. (Spain) Aliona Bolsova / (Estonia) Ingrid Neel (first round)
2. (United States) Angela Kulikov / (United States) Sabrina Santamaria (first round)
3. (Japan) Eri Hozumi / (South Korea) Jang Su-jeong (final)
4. Irina Khromacheva / (Hungary) Panna Udvardy (champions)

== Draw ==
=== Key ===
- Q = Qualifier
- WC = Wild card
- LL = Lucky loser
- Alt = Alternate
- SE = Special exempt
- PR = Protected ranking
- ITF = ITF entry
- JE = Junior exempt
- w/o = Walkover
- r = Retired
- d = Defaulted
- SR = Special ranking

=== Draw ===
First round
1	(Spain) A Bolsova (Estonia) I Neel	6	3	[7]
(Romania) O Gavrilă (Switzerland) C Perrin	4	6	[10]
(Uzbekistan) N Abduraimova; A Gabueva	4	3
(Croatia) M Dražić (Bosnia and Herzegovina) A Wagner	6	6
4	I Khromacheva (Hungary) P Udvardy	6	6
(Indonesia) J Rompies (Australia) O Tjandramulia	1	3
(United Kingdom) E Appleton (Germany) J Lohoff	3	6	[10]
(France) E Lechemia (France) C Paquet	6	2	[4]
(Sweden) C Hennemann (Sweden) K Rinaldo Persson	0	6	[8]
(Sweden) J Cabaj Awad (Sweden) L Zaar	6	3	[10]
(Argentina) J Riera (Latvia) D Semeņistaja	1	3
3	(Japan) E Hozumi (South Korea) S-j Jang	6	6
(Czech Republic) M Bayerlová (France) E Cascino	1	2
(Norway) M Helgø (United States) C Liu	6	6
(Thailand) L Kumkhum (Thailand) P Plipuech	6	6
2	(United States) A Kulikov (United States) S Santamaria	2	3

Quarterfinals
(Romania) O Gavrilă (Switzerland) C Perrin	6	6
(Croatia) M Dražić (Bosnia and Herzegovina) A Wagner	4	4
4	I Khromacheva (Hungary) P Udvardy	7^{7}	6
(United Kingdom) E Appleton (Germany) J Lohoff	6^{5}	4
(Sweden) J Cabaj Awad (Sweden) L Zaar	5	1
3	(Japan) E Hozumi (South Korea) S-j Jang	7	6
(Norway) M Helgø (United States) C Liu	6	5	[6]
(Thailand) L Kumkhum (Thailand) P Plipuech	3	7	[10]

Semifinals
(Romania) O Gavrilă (Switzerland) C Perrin	5	4
4	I Khromacheva (Hungary) P Udvardy	7	6
3	(Japan) E Hozumi (South Korea) S-j Jang	6	4	[10]
(Thailand) L Kumkhum (Thailand) P Plipuech	4	6	[3]

Final
4	I Khromacheva (Hungary) P Udvardy	4	6	[10]
3	(Japan) E Hozumi (South Korea) S-j Jang	6	3	[5]
