= 2023 Swedish Open =

- Date: 10–15 July (women); 17–23 July (men)
- Edition: 75th (men); 13th (women)
- Prize money: €562,815 (men) $115,000 (women)
- Surface: Clay / outdoor
- Venue: Båstad Tennis Stadium

Champions

Men's singles
- Andrey Rublev

Women's singles
- (Serbia) Olga Danilović

Men's doubles
- (Ecuador) Gonzalo Escobar / (Kazakhstan) Aleksandr Nedovyesov

Women's doubles
- Irina Khromacheva / (Hungary) Panna Udvardy
- Swedish Open

The 2023 Swedish Open (also known as the Nordea Open for sponsorship reasons) was a professional tennis tournament played on outdoor clay courts as part of the ATP Tour 250 Series of the 2023 ATP Tour and as part of the WTA 125 tournaments. It took place in Båstad, Sweden, from 10 through 15 July 2023 for the women's tournament, and from 17 through 23 July 2023 for the men's tournament. It was the 75th edition of the event for the men and the 13th edition for the women.

== Champions ==
=== Men's singles ===
- Andrey Rublev def. (Norway) Casper Ruud, 7–6^{(7–3)}, 6–0

=== Women's singles ===
- (Serbia) Olga Danilović def. (United States) Emma Navarro 7–6^{(7–4)}, 3–6, 6–3

=== Men's doubles ===
- (Ecuador) Gonzalo Escobar / (Kazakhstan) Aleksandr Nedovyesov def. (Portugal) Francisco Cabral / (Brazil) Rafael Matos, 6–2, 6–2

=== Women's doubles ===
- Irina Khromacheva / (Hungary) Panna Udvardy def. (Japan) Eri Hozumi / (South Korea) Jang Su-jeong 4–6, 6–3, [10–5]

== Points and prize money ==
=== Point distribution ===
Event	W	F	SF	QF	Round of 16	Round of 32	Q	Q2	Q1
Men's singles	250	150	90	45	20	0	12	6	0
Men's doubles	250	150	90	45	0	—N/a	—N/a	—N/a	—N/a
Women's singles	160	95	57	29	15	1	—N/a	—N/a	—N/a
Women's doubles	160	95	57	29	1	—N/a	—N/a	—N/a	—N/a

=== Prize money ===
Event	W	F	SF	QF	Round of 16	Round of 32^{1}	Q2	Q1
Men's singles	€85,605	€49,940	€29,355	€17,010	€9,880	€6,035	€3,020	€1,645
Men's doubles *	€29,740	€15,910	€9,330	€5,220	€3,070	—N/a	—N/a	—N/a
Women's singles	$15,000	$8,500	$6,000	$4,000	$2,400	$1,300	—N/a	—N/a
Women's doubles *	$5,000	$2,500	$1,500	$1,250	$1,000	—N/a	—N/a	—N/a

_{^{1} Qualifiers prize money is also the Round of 32 prize money}
_{* per team}

== ATP singles main-draw entrants ==
=== Seeds ===
Country	Player	Rank^{1}	Seed
NOR	Casper Ruud	4	1
	Andrey Rublev	7	2
ITA	Lorenzo Musetti	16	3
ARG	Francisco Cerúndolo	19	4
GER	Alexander Zverev	21	5
ARG	Tomás Martín Etcheverry	32	6
ESP	Alejandro Davidovich Fokina	34	7
ARG	Sebastián Báez	46	8

- ^{1} Rankings are as of 3 July 2023.

=== Other entrants ===
The following players received wildcards into the main draw:

- (Sweden) Leo Borg
- (Sweden) Dragoș Nicolae Mădăraș
- (Sweden) Elias Ymer

The following players received entry from the qualifying draw:

- (Bolivia) Hugo Dellien
- Pavel Kotov
- (Slovakia) Jozef Kovalík
- (Austria) Filip Misolic

=== Withdrawals ===
- (Netherlands) Tallon Griekspoor → replaced by (Argentina) Juan Manuel Cerúndolo
- Aslan Karatsev → replaced by (Brazil) Thiago Monteiro

== ATP doubles main-draw entrants ==
=== Seeds ===
Country	Player	Country	Player	Rank^{1}	Seed
FRA	Fabrice Martin	GER	Andreas Mies	43	1
BEL	Sander Gillé	BEL	Joran Vliegen	48	2
AUT	Alexander Erler	AUT	Lucas Miedler	78	3
ITA	Simone Bolelli	ITA	Andrea Vavassori	85	4

- ^{1} Rankings are as of 3 July 2023.

=== Other entrants ===
The following pairs received wildcards into the doubles main draw:

- (Sweden) Filip Bergevi / (Sweden) Dragoș Nicolae Mădăraș
- (Sweden) Leo Borg / (Sweden) Simon Freund

=== Withdrawals ===
- (Spain) Sergio Martos Gornés / (Spain) Jaume Munar → replaced by (Romania) Victor Vlad Cornea / (Spain) Sergio Martos Gornés
- (Uruguay) Ariel Behar / (Czech Republic) Adam Pavlásek → replaced by (Uruguay) Ariel Behar / (Brazil) Orlando Luz
- (Monaco) Hugo Nys / (Poland) Jan Zieliński → replaced by (Ecuador) Diego Hidalgo / (Colombia) Cristian Rodríguez

== WTA singles main-draw entrants ==
=== Seeds ===
Country	Player	Rank^{1}	Seed
USA	Emma Navarro	55	1
KAZ	Yulia Putintseva	56	2
	~~Kamilla Rakhimova~~	~~72~~	~~3~~
SWE	Rebecca Peterson	75	4
HUN	Panna Udvardy	82	5
UKR	Kateryna Baindl	85	6
USA	Claire Liu	93	7
SRB	Olga Danilović	94	8
BUL	Viktoriya Tomova	99	9

- ^{1} Rankings are as of 3 July 2023.

=== Other entrants ===
The following players received wildcards into the main draw:

- (Sweden) Bella Bergkvist Larsson
- (Sweden) Jacqueline Cabaj Awad
- (Sweden) Nellie Taraba Wallberg
- (Sweden) Lisa Zaar

The following player received entry using a protected ranking into the singles main draw:

- (Slovenia) Polona Hercog

The following players received entry as alternates:

- (United Kingdom) Emily Appleton
- (Romania) Oana Gavrilă
- (Norway) Malene Helgø

=== Withdrawals ===
Before the tournament

- (Italy) Lucia Bronzetti → replaced by (Sweden) Mirjam Björklund
- (France) Léolia Jeanjean → replaced by (Thailand) Peangtarn Plipuech
- Anna Kalinskaya → replaced by (Hungary) Réka Luca Jani
- (United States) Sofia Kenin → replaced by (Slovenia) Polona Hercog
- (Spain) Nuria Párrizas Díaz → replaced by Irina Khromacheva
- Kamilla Rakhimova → replaced by (United Kingdom) Emily Appleton
- (United States) Alison Riske-Amritraj → replaced by (Norway) Malene Helgø
- (Denmark) Clara Tauson → replaced by (Uzbekistan) Nigina Abduraimova
- (Switzerland) Jil Teichmann → replaced by (France) Chloé Paquet
- (United States) Taylor Townsend → replaced by (Romania) Oana Gavrilă
- (Italy) Martina Trevisan → replaced by (United States) Louisa Chirico
- (Switzerland) Simona Waltert → replaced by (Latvia) Darja Semeņistaja

== WTA doubles main-draw entrants ==
=== Seeds ===
Country	Player	Country	Player	Rank^{1}	Seed
ESP	Aliona Bolsova	EST	Ingrid Neel	120	1
USA	Angela Kulikov	USA	Sabrina Santamaria	130	2
JPN	Eri Hozumi	KOR	Jang Su-jeong	164	3
	Irina Khromacheva	HUN	Panna Udvardy	174	4

- ^{1} Rankings are as of 3 July 2023.
