= 2025 Swedish Open =

- Date: 7–13 July (women); 14–20 July (men)
- Edition: 77th (men); 15th (women)
- Prize money: €579,320 (men) $115,000 (women)
- Surface: Clay / outdoor
- Venue: Båstad Tennis Stadium

Champions

Men's singles
- (Italy) Luciano Darderi

Women's singles
- (Italy) Elisabetta Cocciaretto

Men's doubles
- (Argentina) Guido Andreozzi / (Netherlands) Sander Arends

Women's doubles
- (Czech Republic) Jesika Malečková / (Czech Republic) Miriam Škoch
- Swedish Open

The 2025 Swedish Open (also known as the Nordea Open for sponsorship reasons) was a professional tennis tournament played on outdoor clay courts as part of the ATP Tour 250 Series of the 2025 ATP Tour and as part of the 2025 WTA 125 tournaments. It took place in Båstad, Sweden, from 7 through 13 July 2025 for the women's tournament, and from 14 through 20 July 2025 for the men's tournament. It was the 77th edition of the event for the men and the 15th edition for the women.

== Champions ==
=== Men's singles ===
- (Italy) Luciano Darderi def. (Netherlands) Jesper de Jong, 6–4, 3–6, 6–3

=== Women's singles ===
- (Italy) Elisabetta Cocciaretto def. (Poland) Katarzyna Kawa, 6–3, 6–4

=== Men's doubles ===
- (Argentina) Guido Andreozzi / (Netherlands) Sander Arends def. (Czech Republic) Adam Pavlásek / (Poland) Jan Zieliński, 6–7^{(4–7)}, 7–5, [10–6]

=== Women's doubles ===
- (Czech Republic) Jesika Malečková / (Czech Republic) Miriam Škoch def. (Spain) Irene Burillo / (Turkey) Berfu Cengiz, 6–4, 6–3

== ATP singles main-draw entrants ==
=== Seeds ===
Country	Player	Rank^{1}	Seed
ARG	Francisco Cerúndolo	19	1
NED	Tallon Griekspoor	31	2
POR	Nuno Borges	37	3
ARG	Sebastián Báez	38	4
ARG	Camilo Ugo Carabelli	56	5
ITA	Luciano Darderi	59	6
BIH	Damir Džumhur	67	7
CZE	Vít Kopřiva	78	8

- ^{1} Rankings are as of 30 June 2025.

=== Other entrants ===
The following players received wildcards into the main draw:

- (Sweden) William Rejchtman Vinciguerra
- (Sweden) Elias Ymer
- (Sweden) Mikael Ymer

The following players received entry from the qualifying draw:

- (Norway) Nicolai Budkov Kjær
- (Austria) Filip Misolic
- (Brazil) Thiago Monteiro
- (Italy) Andrea Pellegrino

=== Withdrawals ===
- (Bulgaria) Grigor Dimitrov → replaced by (Chile) Cristian Garín
- (Poland) Hubert Hurkacz → replaced by (Portugal) Jaime Faria

== ATP doubles main-draw entrants ==
=== Seeds ===
Country	Player	Country	Player	Rank^{1}	Seed
ARG	Guido Andreozzi	NED	Sander Arends	80	1
MON	Romain Arneodo	FRA	Manuel Guinard	84	2
SWE	André Göransson	BRA	Orlando Luz	84	3
CZE	Adam Pavlásek	POL	Jan Zieliński	87	4

- ^{1} Rankings are as of 30 June 2025.

=== Other entrants ===
The following pairs received wildcards into the doubles main draw:

- (Sweden) Erik Grevelius / (Sweden) Adam Heinonen
- (Sweden) Olle Wallin / (Sweden) Elias Ymer

The following pair received entry using a protected ranking:

- (Argentina) Guillermo Durán / (Argentina) Camilo Ugo Carabelli

The following pair received entry as alternates:

- (United States) George Goldhoff / (France) Grégoire Jacq

=== Withdrawals ===
- (France) Théo Arribagé / (France) Hugo Gaston → replaced by (France) Théo Arribagé / (Chile) Tomás Barrios Vera
- (Argentina) Román Andrés Burruchaga / (Argentina) Francisco Cerúndolo → replaced by (Argentina) Guillermo Durán / (Argentina) Camilo Ugo Carabelli
- (Bolivia) Hugo Dellien / (Bosnia and Herzegovina) Damir Džumhur → replaced by (United States) George Goldhoff / (France) Grégoire Jacq

== WTA singles main-draw entrants ==
=== Seeds ===
Country	Player	Rank^{1}	Seed
ITA	Lucia Bronzetti	63	1
FRA	Loïs Boisson	66	2
JPN	Moyuka Uchijima	72	3
ESP	Nuria Párrizas Díaz	83	4
EGY	Mayar Sherif	86	5
CRO	Antonia Ružić	91	6
HUN	Dalma Gálfi	110	7
ITA	Elisabetta Cocciaretto	116	8

- ^{1} Rankings are as of 30 June 2025.

=== Other entrants ===
The following players received wildcards into the main draw:

- (Sweden) Linea Bajraliu
- (France) Loïs Boisson
- (Sweden) Caijsa Hennemann
- (Sweden) Kajsa Rinaldo Persson

The following players received entry using a protected ranking:

- (Turkey) Berfu Cengiz
- (Slovenia) Kaja Juvan

=== Withdrawals ===
- Polina Kudermetova → replaced by Ekaterina Makarova
- (France) Diane Parry → replaced by (Spain) Irene Burillo
- (Kazakhstan) Yulia Putintseva → replaced by (Italy) Martina Trevisan
- (Australia) Daria Saville → replaced by (United States) Louisa Chirico
- (Germany) Ella Seidel → replaced by (Turkey) Berfu Cengiz
- Iryna Shymanovich → replaced by (Lithuania) Justina Mikulskytė
- (China) Wang Xinyu → replaced by (Germany) Mona Barthel

== WTA doubles main-draw entrants ==
=== Seeds ===
Country	Player	Country	Player	Rank^{1}	Seed
JPN	Makoto Ninomiya	JPN	Moyuka Uchijima	156	1
CZE	Jesika Malečková	CZE	Miriam Škoch	185	2
CZE	Anastasia Dețiuc	LAT	Darja Semeņistaja	231	3
USA	Jessie Aney	USA	Jessica Failla	241	4

- ^{1} Rankings are as of 30 June 2025.
