= 2022 Swedish Open – Women's singles =

Women's singles
- 2022 Swedish Open

Final
- Champion: (South Korea) Jang Su-jeong
- Runner-up: (Spain) Rebeka Masarova
- Score: 3–6, 6–3, 6–1

Events
Singles	men	women
Doubles	men	women
← 2021 ·	Swedish Open	· 2023 →

Jang Su-jeong defeated Rebeka Masarova in the final, 3–6, 6–3, 6–1 to win the women's singles tennis title at the 2022 Swedish Open.

Nuria Párrizas Díaz was the reigning champion, but chose not to participate.

== Seeds ==
1. (China) Zheng Qinwen (withdrew)
2. (Slovakia) Anna Karolína Schmiedlová (quarterfinals)
3. (France) Clara Burel (first round)
4. (Sweden) Rebecca Peterson (quarterfinals)
5. (Hungary) Panna Udvardy (quarterfinals)
6. (United States) Lauren Davis (semifinals)
7. (Japan) Misaki Doi (first round)
8. Kamilla Rakhimova (first round)

== Draw ==
=== Key ===
- Q = Qualifier
- WC = Wild card
- LL = Lucky loser
- Alt = Alternate
- SE = Special exempt
- PR = Protected ranking
- ITF = ITF entry
- JE = Junior exempt
- w/o = Walkover
- r = Retired
- d = Defaulted
- SR = Special ranking

=== Finals ===
Semifinals
(Bulgaria) Viktoriya Tomova	2	3
(South Korea) Jang Su-jeong	6	6
6	(United States) Lauren Davis	6^{3}	5
(Spain) Rebeka Masarova	7^{7}	7

Final
(South Korea) Jang Su-jeong	3	6	6
(Spain) Rebeka Masarova	6	3	1

=== Top half ===
First round
Alt	(Australia) O Tjandramulia	3	1
(China) Y Yuan	6	6
(Italy) E Cocciaretto	4	2
(Romania) M Buzărnescu	6	6
(Bulgaria) V Tomova	6	6
WC	(Sweden) J Cabaj Awad	3	2
(Turkey) İ Öz	6	6
8	K Rakhimova	4	4
3	(France) C Burel	2	1
(South Korea) S-j Jang	6	6
I Khromacheva	6	6
Alt	(Thailand) P Plipuech	0	0
(Mexico) R Zarazúa	4	6	1
WC	(Sweden) C Hennemann	6	2	6
(Greece) V Grammatikopoulou	2	5
5	(Hungary) P Udvardy	6	7

Second round
(China) Y Yuan	2	1
(Romania) M Buzărnescu	6	6
(Bulgaria) V Tomova	6	3	6
(Turkey) İ Öz	2	6	2
(South Korea) S-j Jang	6	6
I Khromacheva	0	1
WC	(Sweden) C Hennemann	4	2
5	(Hungary) P Udvardy	6	6

Quarterfinals
(Romania) M Buzărnescu	3	0
(Bulgaria) V Tomova	6	6
(South Korea) S-j Jang	6	7
5	(Hungary) P Udvardy	4	5

Semifinals
(Bulgaria) V Tomova	2	3
(South Korea) S-j Jang	6	6

=== Bottom half ===
First round
6	(United States) L Davis	6	6
WC	(Sweden) K Rinaldo Persson	2	1
(United States) F Di Lorenzo	4	2
(Ukraine) K Zavatska	6	6
SR	V Flink	2	3
(France) L Jeanjean	6	6
(Norway) M Helgø	4	2
4	(Sweden) R Peterson	6	6
7	(Japan) M Doi	4	6	2
(Sweden) M Björklund	6	4	6
(United States) G Min	1	6	2
(Spain) R Masarova	6	0	6
WC	(Sweden) L Zaar	1	2
E Avanesyan	6	6
(Finland) A Kulikova	1	6^{5}
2	(Slovakia) AK Schmiedlová	6	7^{7}

Second round
6	(United States) L Davis	6	6
(Ukraine) K Zavatska	4	1
(France) L Jeanjean	6	5	3
4	(Sweden) R Peterson	4	7	6
(Sweden) M Björklund	2	3
(Spain) R Masarova	6	6
E Avanesyan	2	3
2	(Slovakia) AK Schmiedlová	6	6

Quarterfinals
6	(United States) L Davis	6	6
4	(Sweden) R Peterson	3	2
(Spain) R Masarova	3	6	7
2	(Slovakia) AK Schmiedlová	6	1	5

Semifinals
6	(United States) L Davis	6^{3}	5
(Spain) R Masarova	7^{7}	7
