= 2024 Swedish Open – Men's doubles =

Men's doubles
- 2024 Swedish Open

Final
- Champions: (Brazil) Orlando Luz (Brazil) Rafael Matos
- Runners-up: (France) Manuel Guinard (France) Grégoire Jacq
- Score: 7–5, 6–4

Events
Singles	men	women
Doubles	men	women
- Swedish Open

Orlando Luz and Rafael Matos defeated Manuel Guinard and Grégoire Jacq in the final, 7–5, 6–4 to win the men's doubles tennis title at the 2024 Swedish Open. It was the first ATP Tour doubles title for Luz, and ninth for Matos.

Gonzalo Escobar and Aleksandr Nedovyesov were the defending champions, but lost in the semifinals to Guinard and Jacq.

== Seeds ==
1. (Ecuador) Gonzalo Escobar / (Kazakhstan) Aleksandr Nedovyesov (semifinals)
2. (Argentina) Guido Andreozzi / (Mexico) Miguel Ángel Reyes-Varela (first round)
3. (Brazil) Orlando Luz / (Brazil) Rafael Matos (champions)
4. (Brazil) Fernando Romboli / (Brazil) Marcelo Zormann (first round)

== Draw ==
Key

- Q = Qualifier
- WC = Wild card
- LL = Lucky loser
- Alt = Alternate
- ITF = ITF entry
- PR = Protected ranking
- SR = Special ranking
- SE = Special exempt
- JE = Junior exempt
- JR = Junior Accelerator Programme entrant
- CO = College Accelerator Programme entrant
- NG = Next Gen Accelerator Program entrant
- w/o = Walkover
- r = Retired
- d = Defaulted

=== Draw ===
First round
1	(Ecuador) G Escobar (Kazakhstan) A Nedovyesov	1	6	[10]
(Portugal) N Borges (Portugal) F Cabral	6	3	[5]
(Argentina) F Coria (Japan) T Daniel	6	6
WC	(Sweden) L Borg (Sweden) W Rejchtman Vinciguerra	3	4
4	(Brazil) F Romboli (Brazil) M Zormann	3	4
(France) M Guinard (France) G Jacq	6	6
(France) A Müller (France) L Van Assche	6	6
(Poland) K Drzewiecki (India) S Nagal	3	4
P Kotov (Poland) P Matuszewski	6	6
PR	(Netherlands) D Pel (Netherlands) B Stevens	2	4
(South Korea) J-s Nam (Finland) P Niklas-Salminen	3	4
3	(Brazil) O Luz (Brazil) R Matos	6	6
(France) T Arribagé; R Safiullin	6	6
(Argentina) M Navone (United Kingdom) C Norrie	3	2
WC	(Spain) R Nadal (Norway) C Ruud	6	6
2	(Argentina) G Andreozzi (Mexico) MÁ Reyes-Varela	1	4

Quarterfinals
1	(Ecuador) G Escobar (Kazakhstan) A Nedovyesov	4	6	[11]
(Argentina) F Coria (Japan) T Daniel	6	3	[9]
(France) M Guinard (France) G Jacq	6	6
(France) A Müller (France) L Van Assche	4	1
P Kotov (Poland) P Matuszewski	3	6^{4}
3	(Brazil) O Luz (Brazil) R Matos	6	7^{7}
(France) T Arribagé; R Safiullin	4	6	[10]
WC	(Spain) R Nadal (Norway) C Ruud	6	3	[12]

Semifinals
1	(Ecuador) G Escobar (Kazakhstan) A Nedovyesov	3	4
(France) M Guinard (France) G Jacq	6	6
3	(Brazil) O Luz (Brazil) R Matos	w/o
WC	(Spain) R Nadal (Norway) C Ruud

Final
(France) M Guinard (France) G Jacq	5	4
3	(Brazil) O Luz (Brazil) R Matos	7	6
