= 2024 Swedish Open – Men's singles =

Men's singles
- 2024 Swedish Open

Final
- Champion: (Portugal) Nuno Borges
- Runner-up: (Spain) Rafael Nadal
- Score: 6–3, 6–2

Details
- Draw: 28
- Seeds: 8

Events
Singles	men	women
Doubles	men	women
- Swedish Open

Nuno Borges defeated Rafael Nadal in the final, 6–3, 6–2 to win the men's singles tennis title at the 2024 Swedish Open. It was his first ATP Tour title. Borges became the second Portuguese player in the Open Era to win a main tour singles title, after João Sousa. It was Nadal's first final since the 2022 French Open, and the last of his 131 career finals on the ATP tour overall. It was also Nadal's last appearance in an ATP Tour event.

Andrey Rublev was the defending champion, but lost to Thiago Agustín Tirante in the second round.

The quarterfinal match between Nadal and Mariano Navone lasted four hours, becoming the third-longest best-of-three match since 1991. It was the second-longest best-of-three match of Nadal's career (after the 2009 Madrid Open semifinal against Novak Djokovic).

== Seeds ==
The top four seeds received a bye into the second round.

1. Andrey Rublev (second round)
2. (Norway) Casper Ruud (second round)
3. (Netherlands) Tallon Griekspoor (second round)
4. (Argentina) Mariano Navone (quarterfinals)
5. (United Kingdom) Cameron Norrie (second round)
6. Roman Safiullin (first round)
7. (Portugal) Nuno Borges (champion)
8. Pavel Kotov (second round)

== Draw ==
Key

- Q = Qualifier
- WC = Wild card
- LL = Lucky loser
- Alt = Alternate
- ITF = ITF entry
- PR = Protected ranking
- SR = Special ranking
- SE = Special exempt
- JE = Junior exempt
- JR = Junior Accelerator Programme entrant
- CO = College Accelerator Programme entrant
- NG = Next Gen Accelerator Program entrant
- w/o = Walkover
- r = Retired
- d = Defaulted

=== Finals ===
Semifinals
(Argentina) Thiago Agustín Tirante	3	4
7	(Portugal) Nuno Borges	6	6
WC	(Spain) Rafael Nadal	4	6	6
Q	(Croatia) Duje Ajduković	6	3	4

Final
7	(Portugal) Nuno Borges	6	6
WC	(Spain) Rafael Nadal	3	2

=== Top half ===
First round
(Argentina) TA Tirante	3	6	6
Q	(Portugal) J Faria	6	1	4
Q	(Kazakhstan) D Yevseyev	7	7
(France) A Müller	5	5
(Spain) R Carballés Baena	5	7^{7}	6
6	R Safiullin	7	6^{3}	3
(Japan) T Daniel	7^{9}	2	6^{4}
Q	(Kazakhstan) T Skatov	6^{7}	6	7^{7}
(Argentina) C Ugo Carabelli	6	2	2
(Portugal) H Rocha	4	6	6
LL	(Italy) A Pellegrino	2	6^{3}
7	(Portugal) N Borges	6	7^{7}

Second round
1	A Rublev	6^{5}	6	4
(Argentina) TA Tirante	7^{7}	3	6
Q	(Kazakhstan) D Yevseyev	6	3	2
(Spain) R Carballés Baena	2	6	6
3	(Netherlands) T Griekspoor	6	3	4
Q	(Kazakhstan) T Skatov	1	6	6
(Portugal) H Rocha	6	4	0
7	(Portugal) N Borges	1	6	6

Quarterfinals
(Argentina) TA Tirante	6	2	7
(Spain) R Carballés Baena	3	6	5
Q	(Kazakhstan) T Skatov	4	3
7	(Portugal) N Borges	6	6

Semifinals
(Argentina) TA Tirante	3	4
7	(Portugal) N Borges	6	6

=== Bottom half ===
First round
5	(United Kingdom) C Norrie	7^{7}	6
(Slovakia) J Kovalík	6^{3}	4
WC	(Spain) R Nadal	6	6
WC	(Sweden) L Borg	3	4
WC	(Sweden) E Ymer	4	3
(India) S Nagal	6	6
8	P Kotov	6	6^{6}	6
(Chile) C Garín	4	7^{8}	1
Q	(Croatia) D Ajduković	6	6
(France) L Van Assche	3	3
(Argentina) F Coria	1	3
(Brazil) T Monteiro	6	6

Second round
5	(United Kingdom) C Norrie	4	4
WC	(Spain) R Nadal	6	6
(India) S Nagal	4	2
4	(Argentina) M Navone	6	6
8	P Kotov	6^{7}	6	3
Q	(Croatia) D Ajduković	7^{9}	3	6
(Brazil) T Monteiro	6	6
2	(Norway) C Ruud	3	3

Quarterfinals
WC	(Spain) R Nadal	6^{2}	7	7
4	(Argentina) M Navone	7^{7}	5	5
Q	(Croatia) D Ajduković	6	4	6
(Brazil) T Monteiro	2	6	4

Semifinals
WC	(Spain) R Nadal	4	6	6
Q	(Croatia) D Ajduković	6	3	4

== Qualifying ==
=== Seeds ===
1. (Italy) Matteo Gigante (first round)
2. (Croatia) Duje Ajduković (qualified)
3. (Argentina) Román Andrés Burruchaga (first round)
4. (Finland) Otto Virtanen (qualifying competition)
5. (Italy) Andrea Pellegrino (qualifying competition, lucky loser)
6. (Kazakhstan) Denis Yevseyev (qualified)
7. (Portugal) Jaime Faria (qualified)
8. (Spain) Alejandro Moro Cañas (qualifying competition)

=== Qualifiers ===
1. (Kazakhstan) Timofey Skatov
2. (Croatia) Duje Ajduković
3. (Kazakhstan) Denis Yevseyev
4. (Portugal) Jaime Faria

=== Lucky loser ===
1. (Italy) Andrea Pellegrino

=== Qualifying draw ===
==== First qualifier ====
First round
1	(Italy) Matteo Gigante	1	0
(Kazakhstan) Timofey Skatov	6	6
Alt	(Czech Republic) Martin Krumich	6	5	1
5	(Italy) Andrea Pellegrino	4	7	6

Qualifying competition
(Kazakhstan) Timofey Skatov	6	6
5	(Italy) Andrea Pellegrino	4	1

==== Second qualifier ====
First round
2	(Croatia) Duje Ajduković	6	6
(Kazakhstan) Dmitry Popko	2	4
Alt	(Spain) Nikolás Sánchez Izquierdo	1	3
8	(Spain) Alejandro Moro Cañas	6	6

Qualifying competition
2	(Croatia) Duje Ajduković	7^{7}	6
8	(Spain) Alejandro Moro Cañas	6^{4}	3

==== Third qualifier ====
First round
3	(Argentina) Román Andrés Burruchaga	2	6	6^{5}
(France) Manuel Guinard	6	1	7^{7}
WC	(Sweden) Ludvig Fredrik Hede	6	1	1
6	(Kazakhstan) Denis Yevseyev	2	6	6

Qualifying competition
(France) Manuel Guinard	6	4	3
6	(Kazakhstan) Denis Yevseyev	4	6	6

==== Fourth qualifier ====
First round
4	(Finland) Otto Virtanen	6	1	6
WC	(Sweden) William Rejchtman Vinciguerra	4	6	4
Alt	Andrey Kuznetsov	3	4
7	(Portugal) Jaime Faria	6	6

Qualifying competition
4	(Finland) Otto Virtanen	1	4
7	(Portugal) Jaime Faria	6	6
