= 2023 Swedish Open – Men's doubles =

Men's doubles
- 2023 Swedish Open

Final
- Champions: (Ecuador) Gonzalo Escobar (Kazakhstan) Aleksandr Nedovyesov
- Runners-up: (Portugal) Francisco Cabral (Brazil) Rafael Matos
- Score: 6–2, 6–2

Events
Singles	men	women
Doubles	men	women
- Swedish Open

Gonzalo Escobar and Aleksandr Nedovyesov defeated Francisco Cabral and Rafael Matos in the final, 6–2, 6–2 to win the men's doubles tennis title at the 2023 Swedish Open.

Matos and David Vega Hernández were the reigning champions, but Vega Hernández chose to play in Gstaad instead.

== Seeds ==
1. (France) Fabrice Martin / (Germany) Andreas Mies (quarterfinals)
2. (Belgium) Sander Gillé / (Belgium) Joran Vliegen (first round)
3. (Austria) Alexander Erler / (Austria) Lucas Miedler (semifinals)
4. (Italy) Simone Bolelli / (Italy) Andrea Vavassori (semifinals)

== Draw ==
Key

- Q = Qualifier
- WC = Wild card
- LL = Lucky loser
- Alt = Alternate
- ITF = ITF entry
- PR = Protected ranking
- SR = Special ranking
- SE = Special exempt
- JE = Junior exempt
- JR = Junior Accelerator Programme entrant
- CO = College Accelerator Programme entrant
- NG = Next Gen Accelerator Program entrant
- w/o = Walkover
- r = Retired
- d = Defaulted

=== Draw ===
First round
1	(France) F Martin (Germany) A Mies	6	6
(Argentina) G Durán (Argentina) TM Etcheverry	3	3
(Romania) VV Cornea (Spain) S Martos Gornés	2	4
(Portugal) F Cabral (Brazil) R Matos	6	6
3	(Austria) A Erler (Austria) L Miedler	7^{7}	7^{7}
(Uruguay) A Behar (Brazil) O Luz	6^{4}	6^{3}
(Netherlands) S Arends (Netherlands) D Pel	6	6
WC	(Sweden) F Bergevi (Sweden) DN Mădăraș	4	1
(Ecuador) D Hidalgo (Colombia) C Rodríguez	4	2
(Italy) M Cecchinato (Spain) B Zapata Miralles	6	6
(Finland) P Niklas-Salminen (Finland) E Ruusuvuori	4	5
4	(Italy) S Bolelli (Italy) A Vavassori	6	7
WC	(Sweden) L Borg (Sweden) S Freund	1	4
(Ecuador) G Escobar (Kazakhstan) A Nedovyesov	6	6
(Serbia) N Ćaćić (Serbia) D Lajović	1	6	[10]
2	(Belgium) S Gillé (Belgium) J Vliegen	6	3	[4]

Quarterfinals
1	(France) F Martin (Germany) A Mies	2	1
(Portugal) F Cabral (Brazil) R Matos	6	6
3	(Austria) A Erler (Austria) L Miedler	6^{3}	6	[10]
(Netherlands) S Arends (Netherlands) D Pel	7^{7}	4	[6]
(Italy) M Cecchinato (Spain) B Zapata Miralles	4	4
4	(Italy) S Bolelli (Italy) A Vavassori	6	6
(Ecuador) G Escobar (Kazakhstan) A Nedovyesov	6	7
(Serbia) N Ćaćić (Serbia) D Lajović	1	5

Semifinals
(Portugal) F Cabral (Brazil) R Matos	6	6
3	(Austria) A Erler (Austria) L Miedler	2	3
4	(Italy) S Bolelli (Italy) A Vavassori	3	4
(Ecuador) G Escobar (Kazakhstan) A Nedovyesov	6	6

Final
(Portugal) F Cabral (Brazil) R Matos	2	2
(Ecuador) G Escobar (Kazakhstan) A Nedovyesov	6	6
