= 2022 Swedish Open – Men's singles =

Men's singles
- 2022 Swedish Open

Final
- Champion: (Argentina) Francisco Cerúndolo
- Runner-up: (Argentina) Sebastián Báez
- Score: 7–6^{(7–4)}, 6–2

Details
- Draw: 28
- Seeds: 8

Events
Singles	men	women
Doubles	men	women
← 2021 ·	Swedish Open	· 2023 →

Francisco Cerúndolo defeated Sebastián Báez in the final, 7–6^{(7–4)}, 6–2 to win the men's singles tennis title at the 2022 Swedish Open. It was his maiden ATP Tour title.

Casper Ruud was the defending champion, but was defeated by Cerúndolo in the second round.

== Seeds ==
The top four seeds receive a bye into the second round.

1. (Norway) Casper Ruud (second round)
2. Andrey Rublev (semifinals)
3. (Argentina) Diego Schwartzman (quarterfinals)
4. (Spain) Roberto Bautista Agut (second round)
5. (Spain) Pablo Carreño Busta (semifinals)
6. (Georgia (country)) Nikoloz Basilashvili (first round, retired)
7. (Denmark) Holger Rune (first round)
8. (Argentina) Sebastián Báez (final)

== Draw ==
=== Key ===
- Q = Qualifier
- WC = Wild card
- LL = Lucky loser
- Alt = Alternate
- SE = Special exempt
- PR = Protected ranking
- ITF = ITF entry
- JE = Junior exempt
- w/o = Walkover
- r = Retired
- d = Defaulted
- SR = Special ranking

=== Finals ===
Semifinals
(Argentina) Francisco Cerúndolo	6	6
5	(Spain) Pablo Carreño Busta	3	2
8	(Argentina) Sebastián Báez	6	6
2	Andrey Rublev	2	4

Final
(Argentina) Francisco Cerúndolo	7^{7}	6
8	(Argentina) Sebastián Báez	6^{4}	2

=== Top half ===
First round
(Argentina) F Cerúndolo	6	6
Q	(Portugal) P Sousa	4	3
A Karatsev	6	2	6
(Italy) L Sonego	0	6	4
(France) H Gaston	7^{8}	3
6	(Georgia (country)) N Basilashvili	6^{6}	0^{r}
WC	(Sweden) E Ymer	6	7^{7}
(Germany) D Altmaier	4	6^{5}
(Spain) A Ramos Viñolas	6	6
Q	(Argentina) TM Etcheverry	3	3
WC	(Switzerland) S Wawrinka	5	4
5	(Spain) P Carreño Busta	7	6

Second round
1	(Norway) C Ruud	4	6	5
(Argentina) F Cerúndolo	6	3	7
A Karatsev	6	6
(France) H Gaston	2	4
3	(Argentina) D Schwartzman	7	6
WC	(Sweden) E Ymer	5	3
(Spain) A Ramos Viñolas	6	6^{5}	5
5	(Spain) P Carreño Busta	4	7^{7}	7

Quarterfinals
(Argentina) F Cerúndolo	7	6
A Karatsev	5	1
3	(Argentina) D Schwartzman	1	0
5	(Spain) P Carreño Busta	6	6

Semifinals
(Argentina) F Cerúndolo	6	6
5	(Spain) P Carreño Busta	3	2

=== Bottom half ===
First round
8	(Argentina) S Báez	6	6
LL	(Italy) F Fognini	3	4
(Spain) A Davidovich Fokina	6	6
(Portugal) J Sousa	4	2
(Finland) E Ruusuvuori	6	1	6^{5}
PR	(Austria) D Thiem	3	6	7^{7}
7	(Denmark) H Rune	3	4
Q	(Switzerland) M-A Hüsler	6	6
WC	(Italy) L Musetti	3	5
(Serbia) L Đere	6	7
(Argentina) F Coria	0	6	6
Q	(Argentina) F Delbonis	6	4	4

Second round
8	(Argentina) S Báez	6	6
(Spain) A Davidovich Fokina	2	3
PR	(Austria) D Thiem	7^{7}	3	6
4	(Spain) R Bautista Agut	6^{5}	6	4
Q	(Switzerland) M-A Hüsler	5	2
(Serbia) L Đere	7	6
(Argentina) F Coria	5	6	6^{2}
2	A Rublev	7	4	7^{7}

Quarterfinals
8	(Argentina) S Báez	6	6^{5}	6
PR	(Austria) D Thiem	2	7^{7}	4
(Serbia) L Đere	5	4
2	A Rublev	7	6

Semifinals
8	(Argentina) S Báez	6	6
2	A Rublev	2	4

== Qualifying ==
=== Seeds ===
1. (Italy) Fabio Fognini (qualifying competition, lucky loser)
2. (Spain) Jaume Munar (qualifying competition)
3. (Argentina) Tomás Martín Etcheverry (qualified)
4. (Argentina) Federico Delbonis (qualified)
5. (Switzerland) Henri Laaksonen (first round)
6. (Argentina) Facundo Bagnis (first round)
7. (Switzerland) Marc-Andrea Hüsler (qualified)
8. (Colombia) Daniel Elahi Galán (qualifying competition)

=== Qualifiers ===
1. (Switzerland) Marc-Andrea Hüsler
2. (Portugal) Pedro Sousa
3. (Argentina) Tomás Martín Etcheverry
4. (Argentina) Federico Delbonis

=== Lucky loser ===
1. (Italy) Fabio Fognini

=== Draw ===
==== First qualifier ====
First round
1/Alt	(Italy) Fabio Fognini	6	6
WC	(Sweden) Karl Friberg	4	4
WC	(Sweden) Leo Borg	1	1
7	(Switzerland) Marc-Andrea Hüsler	6	6

Qualifying competition
1/Alt	(Italy) Fabio Fognini	5	7	4
7	(Switzerland) Marc-Andrea Hüsler	7	5	6

==== Second qualifier ====
First round
2	(Spain) Jaume Munar	7^{7}	4	6
(Chile) Nicolás Jarry	6^{4}	6	4
PR	(Portugal) Pedro Sousa	6	7^{7}
6	(Argentina) Facundo Bagnis	4	6^{3}

Qualifying competition
2	(Spain) Jaume Munar	4	4
PR	(Portugal) Pedro Sousa	6	6

==== Third qualifier ====
First round
3	(Argentina) Tomás Martín Etcheverry	6	3	6
Alt	(Norway) Viktor Durasovic	2	6	2
(Germany) Yannick Hanfmann	3	0
8	(Colombia) Daniel Elahi Galán	6	6

Qualifying competition
3	(Argentina) Tomás Martín Etcheverry	3	6	7
8	(Colombia) Daniel Elahi Galán	6	4	5

==== Fourth qualifier ====
First round
4	(Argentina) Federico Delbonis	6	4	7^{9}
(Peru) Juan Pablo Varillas	2	6	6^{7}
Pavel Kotov	6	7
5	(Switzerland) Henri Laaksonen	1	5

Qualifying competition
4	(Argentina) Federico Delbonis	7^{7}	7^{7}
Pavel Kotov	6^{0}	6^{5}
