= Olle Wallin =

Swedish tennis player (born 2001)

- Country (sports): Sweden
- Born: 22 October 2001 (age 25) Halmstad, Sweden
- Height: 1.91 m (6 ft 3 in)
- Plays: Right-handed (two-handed backhand)
- College: Charlotte; Texas Tech
- Prize money: US $69,567

Singles
- Career record: 2–2 (at ATP Tour level, Grand Slam level, and in Davis Cup)
- Career titles: 4 ITF
- Highest ranking: No. 368 (13 July 2026)
- Current ranking: No. 368 (13 July 2026)

Doubles
- Career record: 0–1 (at ATP Tour level, Grand Slam level, and in Davis Cup)
- Career titles: 1 ITF
- Highest ranking: No. 813 (8 June 2026)
- Current ranking: No. 859 (13 July 2026)
- Last updated on: 13 July 2026.

Olle Wallin (born 22 October 2001) is a Swedish tennis player. Wallin has a career high ATP singles ranking of No. 368 achieved on 13 July 2026 and a career high ATP doubles ranking of No. 813 achieved on 8 June 2026.

Wallin played college tennis at Charlotte before transferring to Texas Tech.

== Career ==
Wallin made his ATP main draw debut after receiving a wildcard for the doubles main draw of the 2025 Swedish Open. He also reached the final round of the singles qualifying, losing to Filip Misolic.
