= Nellie Taraba Wallberg =

Swedish tennis player (born 2007)

- Full name: Nellie Angela Frida Tove Taraba Wallberg
- Country (sports): Sweden
- Born: 30 March 2007 (age 19)
- Plays: Right-handed
- Prize money: $26,472

Singles
- Career record: 65–41
- Career titles: 1 ITF
- Highest ranking: No. 515 (2 November 2026)
- Current ranking: No. 553 (16 November 2026)

Grand Slam singles results
- Australian Open Junior: 1R (2025)
- French Open Junior: 3R (2025)
- Wimbledon Junior: 2R (2024)
- US Open Junior: 1R (2025)

Doubles
- Career record: 18–16
- Highest ranking: No. 636 (2 November 2026)
- Current ranking: No. 687 (16 November 2026)

Grand Slam doubles results
- Australian Open Junior: 1R (2025)
- French Open Junior: QF (2025)
- Wimbledon Junior: QF (2025)
- US Open Junior: QF (2025)

Team competitions
- Fed Cup: 0–4
- Last updated on: 16 November 2026.

Nellie Angela Frida Tove Taraba Wallberg (born 30 March 2007) is a Swedish tennis player.

== Early life ==
From Särö, she started playing tennis at the age of three years-old. She had childhood rheumatism, which caused problems with joints and knees and doctors advised that tennis may help.

== Career ==
She was given a wildcard as a 16 year-old into the 2023 Swedish Open. She defeated compatriot Caijsa Hennemann in the first round, before facing eventual champion, Olga Danilović.

She was called-up to play for Sweden in the Billie Jean King Cup in April 2024. She made her debut that month playing doubles against Norway.

She was given as wildcard into the main draw of the 2024 Swedish Open.

In September 2025, she defeated Spain’s Charo Esquiva Bañuls in the girls’ singles final of the U18 European Junior Championships.

== Personal life ==
She is the daughter of Toni Taraba and the boxer, and former WBC female super-featherweight champion, Frida Wallberg.

== ITF Circuit finals ==
=== Singles: 2 (1 title, 1 runner-up) ===
Legend W35 tournaments (0–1) W15 tournaments (1–0)	Finals by surface Hard (1–1)

Result	W–L	Date	Tournament	Tier	Surface	Opponent	Score
Loss	0–1	Oct 2025	ITF Täby, Sweden	W35	Hard (i)	(Sweden) Caijsa Hennemann	4–6, 6–7^{(3)}
Win	1–1	Nov 2025	ITF Monastir, Tunisia	W15	Hard	(United Kingdom) Esther Adeshina	6–0, 6–4

=== Doubles: 3 (runner-ups) ===
Legend W50 tournaments (0–1) W35 tournaments (0–2)	Finals by surface Hard (0–1) Clay (0–2)

Result	W–L	Date	Tournament	Tier	Surface	Partner	Opponents	Score
Loss	0–1	Oct 2025	ITF Täby, Sweden	W35	Hard (i)	(Sweden) Linea Bajraliu	(Ukraine) Kateryna Lazarenko (Latvia) Beatrise Zeltiņa	2–6, 2–6
Loss	0–2	Sep 2026	ITF Plovdiv, Bulgaria	W50	Clay	(Sweden) Caijsa Hennemann	(Romania) Oana Gavrilă (Greece) Sapfo Sakellaridi	0–6, 6–7^{(2)}
Loss	0–3	Oct 2026	ITF Santa Margherita di Pula, Italy	W35	Clay	(Latvia) Beatrise Zeltiņa	(Brazil) Carolina Bohrer Martins (Egypt) Yasmin Ezzat	6–3, 4–6, [4–10]
