= Caijsa Hennemann =

Swedish tennis player

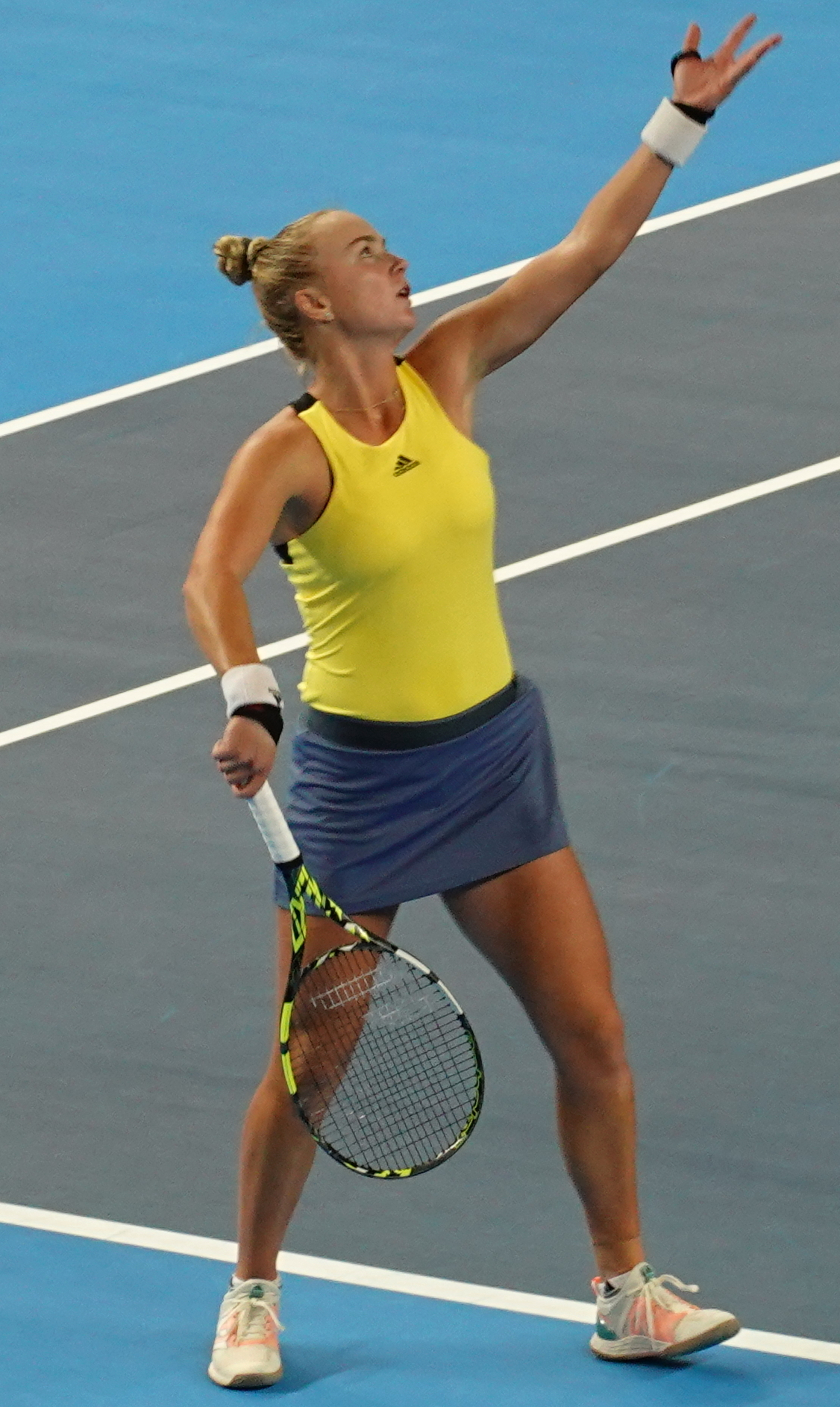
- Hennemann at the 2023 BJK Cup play-offs
- Full name: Caijsa Wilda Hennemann
- Country (sports): Sweden
- Residence: Stockholm, Sweden
- Born: 22 March 2001 (age 25) Gothenburg, Sweden
- Height: 1.68 m (5 ft 6 in)
- Turned pro: 2019
- Plays: Right (two-handed backhand)
- Prize money: $150,644

Singles
- Career record: 237–124
- Career titles: 12 ITF
- Highest ranking: No. 237 (26 October 2026)
- Current ranking: No. 244 (9 November 2026)

Doubles
- Career record: 120–75
- Career titles: 17 ITF
- Highest ranking: No. 154 (3 October 2022)
- Current ranking: No. 236 (26 October 2026)

Team competitions
- Fed Cup: 18–11
- Last updated on: 9 November 2026.

Caijsa Wilda Hennemann (born 22 March 2001) is a Swedish professional tennis player. She has a career-high singles ranking of world No. 237 by the WTA, achieved on 26 October 2026. She peaked at No. 154 in doubles on 3 October 2022. She has won 12 singles and 17 doubles titles on the ITF Women's Circuit.

== Career ==
She started playing tennis at the age of seven. Her favourite tennis player was Maria Sharapova.

As a junior, Hennemann was ranked best as world No. 30. She reached the final of the European Tennis Championship both as a 16- and 18-year-old. She played all Grand Slam tournaments as junior, and in 2019, advanced to the quarterfinals of the French Open, where she lost to Zheng Qinwen in three sets.

Hennemann made her WTA Tour main-draw debut at the 2019 Swedish Open, after receiving a wildcard into the singles and the doubles draws, partnering with Lisa Zaar.

== ITF Circuit finals ==
=== Singles: 17 (12 titles, 5 runner-ups) ===
Legend W25/35 tournaments W15 tournaments	Finals by surface Hard (4–1) Clay (8–4)

Result	W–L	Date	Tournament	Tier	Surface	Opponent	Score
Loss	0–1	May 2019	ITF Gothenburg, Sweden	W15	Clay	(Czech Republic) Aneta Laboutková	6–2, 6–7^{(4)}, 3–6
Win	1–1	Sep 2020	ITF Saint-Palais-sur-Mer, France	W15	Clay	(Hungary) Dorka Drahota-Szabó	3–6, 6–3, 7–6^{(6)}
Loss	1–2	Nov 2021	ITF Helsingborg, Sweden	W15	Hard (i)	(Denmark) Olga Helmi	4–6, 6–1, 4–6
Win	2–2	Jan 2022	GB Pro-Series Bath, UK	W25	Hard (i)	(United Kingdom) Eliz Maloney	6–1, 7–5
Win	3–2	Oct 2022	ITF Santa Margherita di Pula, Italy	W25	Clay	(Switzerland) Ylena In-Albon	6–1, 7–5
Win	4–2	Mar 2023	ITF Amiens, France	W15	Clay	(Belgium) Vicky van de Peer	6–3, 6–1
Loss	4–3	Jul 2023	ITF Alkmaar, Netherlands	W15	Clay	(Hungary) Luca Udvardy	1–6, 5–7
Loss	4–4	Oct 2023	ITF Santa Margherita di Pula, Italy	W25	Clay	(Czech Republic) Sára Bejlek	4–6, 6–7^{(7)}
Win	5–4	Feb 2024	ITF Manacor, Spain	W15	Hard	(Luxembourg) Marie Weckerle	7–5, 6–2
Loss	5–5	Mar 2024	ITF Sabadell, Spain	W15	Clay	(Spain) Kaitlin Quevedo	0–6, 4–6
Win	6–5	Apr 2024	ITF Varberg, Sweden	W15	Clay	(Estonia) Elena Malõgina	6–0, 6–1
Win	7–5	Jun 2024	ITF Kuršumlijska Banja, Serbia	W15	Clay	(Australia) Kaylah McPhee	2–6, 6–4, 6–1
Win	8–5	Jul 2025	ITF Kuršumlijska Banja, Serbia	W15	Clay	(Bulgaria) Lidia Encheva	7–6^{(5)}, 7–5
Win	9–5	Sep 2025	ITF Santa Margherita di Pula, Italy	W35	Clay	(Italy) Lisa Pigato	7–5, 6–2
Win	10–5	Oct 2025	ITF Täby, Sweden	W15	Hard (i)	(Sweden) Nellie Taraba Wallberg	6–4, 7–6^{(3)}
Win	11–5	Nov 2025	ITF Antalya, Turkiye	W35	Hard	(Czech Republic) Julie Štruplová	4–6, 7–6^{(2)}, 6–4
Win	12–5	Oct 2026	ITF Seville, Spain	W35	Clay	(Spain) Ruth Roura Llaverías	6–2, 6–1

=== Doubles: 24 (17 titles, 7 runner-ups) ===
Legend W75 tournaments W50 tournaments W25/35 tournaments W15 tournaments	Finals by surface Hard (3–0) Clay (14–7)

Result	W–L	Date	Tournament	Tier	Surface	Partner	Opponents	Score
Win	1–0	Mar 2019	ITF Antalya, Turkey	W15	Clay	(Sweden) Melis Yasar	(Ukraine) Viktoriia Dema (Hungary) Adrienn Nagy	0–1 ret.
Win	2–0	May 2019	ITF Gothenburg, Sweden	W15	Clay	(Sweden) Melis Yasar	(Czech Republic) Klára Hájková (Czech Republic) Aneta Laboutková	6–2, 6–3
Win	3–0	May 2019	ITF Varberg, Sweden	W15	Clay	(Sweden) Maria Petrovic	(Russia) Ekaterina Makarova (Belarus) Sadafmoh Tolibova	7–6^{(3)}, 6–3
Loss	3–1	Sep 2020	ITF Melilla, Spain	W15	Clay	(Czech Republic) Anna Sisková	(Spain) Yvonne Cavallé Reimers (Spain) Ángela Fita Boluda	6–7^{(1)}, 4–6
Win	4–1	Feb 2021	ITF Antalya, Turkey	W15	Clay	(Hungary) Dorka Drahota-Szabó	(Russia) Polina Bakhmutkina (Russia) Eva Garkusha	6–2, 6–1
Win	5–1	Jul 2021	ITF Tarvisio, Italy	W25	Clay	(Slovenia) Nika Radišić	(Chile) Bárbara Gatica (Brazil) Rebeca Pereira	6–4, 6–1
Win	6–1	Sep 2021	ITF Melilla, Spain	W15	Clay	(South Korea) Ku Yeon-woo	(Germany) Luisa Meyer auf der Heide (Germany) Chantal Sauvant	6–4, 6–1
Win	7–1	Oct 2021	ITF Budapest, Hungary	W25	Clay	(Hungary) Dorka Drahota-Szabó	(Hungary) Adrienn Nagy (Hungary) Natália Szabanin	6–3, 6–0
Win	8–1	Oct 2021	ITF Seville, Spain	W25	Clay	(South Korea) Ku Yeon-woo	(North Macedonia) Lina Gjorcheska (Croatia) Tena Lukas	7–5, 6–1
Win	9–1	Jan 2022	GB Pro-Series Bath, UK	W25	Hard (i)	(Estonia) Elena Malõgina	(Romania) Arina Vasilescu (United Kingdom) Emily Webley-Smith	6–4, 6–3
Loss	9–2	May 2022	ITF Cairo, Egypt	W25	Clay	(Russia) Mariia Tkacheva	(France) Océane Babel (Poland) Weronika Falkowska	4–6, 1–6
Win	10–2	May 2022	ITF Båstad, Sweden	W25	Clay	(Germany) Mona Barthel	(France) Julie Belgraver (Sweden) Fanny Östlund	6–1, 6–4
Win	11–2	May 2022	ITF Varberg, Sweden	W25	Clay	(Sweden) Jacqueline Cabaj Awad	(Sweden) June Björk (Sweden) Julita Saner	6–1, 6–3
Loss	11–3	Jun 2022	ITF Pörtschach, Austria	W25	Clay	(Poland) Martyna Kubka	(Czech Republic) Michaela Bayerlová (Slovenia) Tina Cvetkovič	3–6, 3–6
Win	12–3	Jun 2022	ITF Ystad, Sweden	W25	Clay	(Poland) Martyna Kubka	(United States) Ashley Lahey (Sweden) Lisa Zaar	4–6, 7–5, [10–7]
Win	13–3	Aug 2022	ITF Oldenzaal, Netherlands	W25	Clay	(Sweden) Jacqueline Cabaj Awad	(Netherlands) Rikke de Koning (Netherlands) Marente Sijbesma	6–1, 6–3
Win	14–3	Oct 2023	ITF Näsbypark, Sweden	W15	Hard (i)	(Sweden) Lisa Zaar	(Ukraine) Daria Lopatetska (Ukraine) Daria Yesypchuk	5–7, 6–1, [10–6]
Loss	14–4	Mar 2024	ITF Sabadell, Spain	W15	Clay	(Spain) Yvonne Cavallé Reimers	(Romania) Oana Georgeta Simion (Germany) Joëlle Steur	6–2, 6–7^{(5)}, [7–10]
Loss	14–5	May 2024	ITF Båstad, Sweden	W35	Clay	(Sweden) Jacqueline Cabaj Awad	(Sweden) Linea Bajraliu (Sweden) Bella Bergkvist Larsson	6–4, 2–6, [2–10]
Win	15–5	Sep 2025	ITF Santa Margherita di Pula, Italy	W35	Clay	(Sweden) Lisa Zaar	(Italy) Noemi Basiletti (Italy) Gaia Maduzzi	6–3, 6–3
Win	16–5	Mar 2026	ITF Helsinki, Finland	W50	Hard (i)	(Sweden) Lisa Zaar	(United Kingdom) Emily Appleton (Slovakia) Viktória Hrunčáková	2–6, 6–3, [10–8]
Win	17–5	May 2026	Open Saint-Gaudens, France	W75	Clay	(Sweden) Lisa Zaar	(Sweden) Ingrid Martins; Ekaterina Ovcharenko	6–7^{(5)}, 7–5, [10–7]
Loss	17–6	Sep 2026	ITF Reus, Spain	W35	Clay	(Latvia) Beatrise Zeltiņa	(Spain) Lucía Cortez Llorca (Germany) Joëlle Steur	4–6, 1–6
Loss	17–7	Sep 2026	ITF Plovdiv, Bulgaria	W50	Clay	(Sweden) Nellie Taraba Wallberg	(Romania) Oana Gavrilă (Greece) Sapfo Sakellaridi	0–6, 6–7^{(2)}

== Top 5 highest rank wins ==
#	Tournament	Tier	Date	Surface	Rd	Opponent	Rank	Score	CHR
1	Santa Margherita di Pula, Italy	W25	Oct 2022	Clay	F	(Switzerland) Ylena In-Albon	No. 156	6–1, 7–5	No. 347
2	Budapest, Hungary	W25	Sep 2021	Clay	2R	(France) Chloé Paquet	No. 167	3–6, 6–3, 6–2	No. 546
3	Den Haag, Netherlands	W25	Jun 2022	Clay	2R	(Netherlands) Suzan Lamens	No. 169	7–5, 2–6, 6–3	No. 388
4	Santa Margherita di Pula, Italy	W25	Oct 2023	Clay	SF	(Romania) Irina Bara	No. 192	3–6, 7–5, 6–1	No. 465
5	Swedish Open, Sweden	WTA 125	Jul 2022	Clay	1R	(Mexico) Renata Zarazúa	No. 194	6–4, 2–6, 6–1	No. 388

- statistics correct as of 25 September 2024
