= Tommy Robredo career statistics =

Spanish tennis player statistics

This is a list of the main career statistics of Spanish professional tennis player Tommy Robredo.

Career finals
Discipline	Type	Won	Lost	Total	WR
Singles	Grand Slam tournaments	–	–	–	–
Singles	Year-end championships	–	–	–	–
Singles	ATP Masters 1000*	1	–	1	1.00
Singles	Olympic Games	–	–	–	–
Singles	ATP Tour 500	1	3	4	0.25
Singles	ATP Tour 250	10	7	17	0.59
Singles	Total	12	10	22	0.54
Doubles	Grand Slam tournaments	–	–	–	–
Doubles	Year-end championships	–	–	–	–
Doubles	ATP Masters 1000*	1	1	2	0.50
Doubles	Olympic Games	–	–	–	–
Doubles	ATP Tour 500	–	3	3	0.00
Doubles	ATP Tour 250	4	1	5	0.80
Doubles	Total	5	5	10	0.50
Total		17	15	32	0.53
1) WR = Winning Rate; 2) * formerly known as "Super 9" (1996–1999), "Tennis Masters Series" (2000–2003) or "ATP Masters Series" (2004–2008).

== Performance timelines ==
Key
W	F	SF	QF	#R	RR	Q#	P#	DNQ	A	Z#	PO	G	S	B	NMS	NTI	P	NH

(W) winner; (F) finalist; (SF) semifinalist; (QF) quarterfinalist; (#R) rounds 4, 3, 2, 1; (RR) round-robin stage; (Q#) qualification round; (P#) preliminary round; (DNQ) did not qualify; (A) absent; (Z#) Davis/Fed Cup Zonal Group (with number indication) or (PO) play-off; (G) gold, (S) silver or (B) bronze Olympic/Paralympic medal; (NMS) not a Masters tournament; (NTI) not a Tier I tournament; (P) postponed; (NH) not held; (SR) strike rate (events won / competed); (W–L) win–loss record.
To avoid confusion and double counting, these charts are updated at the conclusion of a tournament or when the player's participation has ended.

=== Singles ===
Tournament	1999	2000	2001	2002	2003	2004	2005	2006	2007	2008	2009	2010	2011	2012	2013	2014	2015	2016	2017	2018	2019	2020	2021	2022	SR	W–L	Win %
Grand Slam tournaments
Australian Open	A	Q2	1R	2R	1R	1R	3R	4R	QF	2R	4R	1R	4R	A	1R	4R	1R	2R	A	A	Q1	A	Q1	A	0 / 15	21–15	58%
French Open	A	Q2	4R	3R	QF	4R	QF	4R	QF	3R	QF	1R	A	A	QF	3R	2R	A	2R	Q1	Q1	Q2	Q1	A	0 / 14	37–14	73%
Wimbledon	A	A	2R	1R	3R	2R	1R	2R	2R	2R	3R	1R	1R	A	3R	4R	1R	A	A	A	A	NH	Q1	A	0 / 14	14–14	50%
US Open	A	Q1	4R	3R	1R	4R	4R	4R	3R	4R	4R	4R	A	2R	QF	4R	3R	A	A	1R	Q2	A	A	A	0 / 15	35–15	70%
Win–loss	0–0	0–0	7–4	5–4	6–4	7–4	9–4	10–4	11–4	7–4	12–4	3–4	3–2	1–1	10–4	11–4	3–4	1–1	1–1	0–1	0–0	0–0	0–0	0–0	0 / 58	107–58	65%
Year-end championships
ATP Finals	did not qualify							RR	did not qualify																0 / 1	1–2	33%
National representation
Olympics	NH	A	not held			3R	not held			1R	not held			A	not held			A	not held				A	NH	0 / 2	2–2	50%
Davis Cup	A	A	A	QF	A	W	A	1R	QF	W	W	A	A	A	A	A	Z1	A	A	A	A	A	A	A	3 / 6	6–8	43%
ATP Tour Masters 1000
Indian Wells	A	A	A	1R	3R	2R	4R	3R	2R	3R	4R	QF	QF	A	1R	3R	4R	A	1R	A	A	NH	A	A	0 / 14	17–13	57%
Miami	A	A	A	2R	2R	4R	3R	2R	QF	2R	3R	3R	A	A	A	4R	2R	A	2R	A	A	NH	A	A	0 / 12	12–11	52%
Monte Carlo	A	A	A	1R	3R	1R	A	QF	3R	3R	2R	3R	3R	A	A	3R	3R	A	1R	Q1	A	NH	A	A	0 / 12	17–12	59%
Madrid (Stuttgart)	A	A	1R	2R	2R	QF	3R	3R	2R	2R	3R	A	A	A	2R	1R	A	A	1R	A	A	NH	A	A	0 / 12	9–12	43%
Rome	A	A	Q1	QF	3R	2R	1R	1R	QF	QF	3R	A	A	A	A	2R	A	A	A	A	A	Q2	A	A	0 / 9	14–9	61%
Hamburg	A	A	Q1	SF	2R	3R	3R	W	2R	2R	not Masters series														1 / 7	16–6	73%
Canada	A	A	A	2R	3R	2R	3R	2R	2R	2R	2R	2R	A	A	A	3R	2R	A	A	A	A	NH	A	A	0 / 11	13–11	54%
Cincinnati	A	A	A	3R	1R	SF	2R	SF	2R	2R	1R	1R	A	A	3R	QF	3R	A	A	A	A	A	A	A	0 / 12	19–12	61%
Shanghai	not Masters series										3R	2R	2R	2R	2R	1R	1R	A	A	A	A	NH			0 / 7	6–7	50%
Paris	A	A	1R	2R	3R	2R	QF	SF	QF	2R	3R	A	A	A	A	2R	A	A	A	A	A	A	A	A	0 / 10	12–10	55%
Win–loss	0–0	0–0	0–2	13–9	10–9	12–9	11–7	19–8	8–9	11–9	12–9	8–6	6–2	1–1	4–4	12–9	7–6	0–0	1–4	0–0	0–0	0–0	0–0	0–0	1 / 106	135–103	57%
Career statistics
Statistic	1999	2000	2001	2002	2003	2004	2005	2006	2007	2008	2009	2010	2011	2012	2013	2014	2015	2016	2017	2018	2019	2020	2021	2022	Career		
Tournaments	2	2	21	25	26	26	24	27	27	24	26	23	15	7	22	26	20	6	11	2	1	0	0	0	363		
Titles	0	0	1	0	0	1	0	2	2	1	2	0	1	0	2	0	0	0	0	0	0	0	0	0	12		
Finals	0	0	2	0	1	1	1	3	4	2	2	0	1	0	2	3	1	0	0	0	0	0	0	0	23		
Overall W–L	2–2	0–2	37–20	32–26	38–26	43–25	44–24	49–29	49–26	37–23	46–25	20–23	20–12	5–7	36–20	43–26	24–21	2–6	6–11	0–2	0–1	0–0	0–0	0–1	12 / 364	533–358	60%
Win (%)	50%	0%	65%	55%	60%	63%	65%	63%	65%	62%	65%	47%	63%	42%	64%	62%	53%	25%	35%	0%	0%	0%	0%	0%	59.82%		
Year-end ranking	244	131	30	30	21	13	19	7	10	21	16	50	51	114	18	17	42	358	164	201	205	224	331	1043	$ 13,467,681		

=== Doubles ===
Tournament	1999	2000	2001	2002	2003	2004	2005	2006	2007	2008	2009	2010	2011	2012	2013	2014	2015	2016	2017	2018	2019	2020	2021	2022	SR	W–L
Grand Slam tournaments
Australian Open	A	A	A	1R	QF	3R	A	A	A	A	3R	2R	3R	A	A	A	A	A	A	A	A	A	A	A	0 / 6	10–6
French Open	A	A	A	A	1R	A	A	A	A	A	QF	1R	A	A	1R	A	A	A	3R	A	A	A	A	A	0 / 5	5–5
Wimbledon	A	A	A	1R	1R	1R	1R	1R	1R	A	A	QF	3R	A	A	A	A	A	A	A	A	NH	A	A	0 / 8	5–8
US Open	A	A	A	A	1R	SF	A	A	A	SF	2R	SF	A	A	2R	A	A	A	A	A	A	A	A	A	0 / 6	14–5
Win–loss	0–0	0–0	0–0	0–2	3–4	6–3	0–1	0–1	0–1	4–1	6–2	8–4	4–2	0–0	1–2	0–0	0–0	0–0	2–1	0–0	0–0	0–0	0–0	0–0	0 / 25	34–24
Career statistics
Statistic	1999	2000	2001	2002	2003	2004	2005	2006	2007	2008	2009	2010	2011	2012	2013	2014	2015	2016	2017	2018	2019	2020	2021	2022	Career	
Titles	0	0	0	0	0	1	0	0	0	1	1	0	1	0	1	0	0	0	0	0	0	0	0	0	5	
Finals	0	0	1	0	0	1	2	0	0	1	3	0	1	0	1	0	0	0	1	0	0	0	0	0	11	
Year-end ranking	349	225	150	152	63	34	79	243	N/A	33	20	34	89	N/A	183	572	251	504	195	405	1192	950	1555			

== Major finals ==
=== Masters Series ===
==== Singles: 1 (1–0) ====
Outcome	Year	Championship	Surface	Opponent	Score
Win	2006	Hamburg	Clay	(Czech Republic) Radek Štěpánek	6–1, 6–3, 6–3

==== Doubles: 1 (1–1) ====
Outcome	Year	Championship	Partner	Opponent	Score
Win	2008	Monte Carlo	(Spain) Rafael Nadal	(India) Mahesh Bhupathi (The Bahamas) Mark Knowles	6–3, 6–3
Loss	2009	Paris	(Spain) Marcel Granollers	(Canada) Daniel Nestor (Serbia) Nenad Zimonjić	3–6, 4–6

== ATP career finals ==
=== Singles: 23 (12 titles, 11 runner-ups) ===
Legend Grand Slam Tournaments (0–0) ATP World Tour Finals (0–0) ATP World Tour Masters 1000 (1–0) ATP World Tour 500 Series (1–3) ATP World Tour 250 Series (10–8)	Finals by surface Hard (1–4) Grass (0–0) Clay (11–7) Carpet (0–0)

Result	No.	Date	Tournament	Surface	Opponent	Score
Loss	1.	Apr 2001	Grand Prix Hassan II, Casablanca, Morocco	Clay	(Argentina) Guillermo Cañas	5–7, 2–6
Win	1.	Jul 2001	Orange Warsaw Open, Sopot, Poland	Clay	(Spain) Albert Portas	1–6, 7–5, 7–6^{(7–2)}
Loss	2.	Jul 2003	Mercedes Cup, Stuttgart, Germany	Clay	(Argentina) Guillermo Coria	2–6, 2–6, 1–6
Win	2.	May 2004	Torneo Godó, Barcelona, Spain	Clay	(Argentina) Gastón Gaudio	6–3, 4–6, 6–2, 3–6, 6–3
Loss	3.	May 2005	Estoril Open, Estoril, Portugal	Clay	(Argentina) Gastón Gaudio	1–6, 6–2, 1–6
Loss	4.	Apr 2006	Torneo Godó, Barcelona, Spain	Clay	(Spain) Rafael Nadal	4–6, 4–6, 0–6
Win	3.	May 2006	Hamburg Masters, Hamburg, Germany	Clay	(Czech Republic) Radek Štěpánek	6–1, 6–3, 6–3
Win	4.	July 2006	Swedish Open, Båstad, Sweden	Clay	(Russia) Nikolay Davydenko	6–2, 6–1
Loss	5.	Jan 2007	Heineken Open, Auckland, New Zealand	Hard	(Spain) David Ferrer	4–6, 2–6
Win	5.	Aug 2007	Orange Warsaw Open, Sopot, Poland (2)	Clay	(Argentina) José Acasuso	7–5, 6–0
Loss	6.	Sep 2007	China Open, Beijing, China	Hard (i)	(Chile) Fernando González	1–6, 6–3, 1–6
Win	6.	Oct 2007	Open de Moselle, Metz, France	Hard (i)	(United Kingdom) Andy Murray	0–6, 6–2, 6–3
Loss	7.	Jun 2008	Orange Warsaw Open, Warsaw, Poland	Clay	(Russia) Nikolay Davydenko	3–6, 3–6
Win	7.	Jul 2008	Swedish Open, Båstad, Sweden (2)	Clay	(Czech Republic) Tomáš Berdych	6–4, 6–1
Win	8.	Feb 2009	Brasil Open, Costa do Sauípe, Brazil	Clay	(Brazil) Thomaz Bellucci	6–3, 3–6, 6–4
Win	9.	Feb 2009	Copa Telmex, Buenos Aires, Argentina	Clay	(Argentina) Juan Mónaco	7–5, 2–6, 7–6^{(7–5)}
Win	10.	Feb 2011	Chile Open, Santiago, Chile	Clay	(Colombia) Santiago Giraldo	6–2, 2–6, 7–6^{(7–5)}
Win	11.	Apr 2013	Grand Prix Hassan II, Casablanca, Morocco	Clay	(South Africa) Kevin Anderson	7–6^{(8–6)}, 4–6, 6–3
Win	12.	Jul 2013	Croatia Open, Umag, Croatia	Clay	(Italy) Fabio Fognini	6–0, 6–3
Loss	8.	Jul 2014	Croatia Open, Umag, Croatia	Clay	(Uruguay) Pablo Cuevas	3–6, 4–6
Loss	9.	Sep 2014	Shenzhen Open, Shenzhen, China	Hard	(United Kingdom) Andy Murray	7–5, 6–7^{(9–11)}, 1–6
Loss	10.	Oct 2014	Valencia Open, Valencia, Spain	Hard (i)	(United Kingdom) Andy Murray	6–3, 6–7^{(7–9)}, 6–7^{(8–10)}
Loss	11.	Jul 2015	Swedish Open, Båstad, Sweden	Clay	(France) Benoît Paire	6–7^{(7–9)}, 3–6

=== Doubles: 11 (5–6) ===
Legend Grand Slam Tournaments (0–0) ATP World Tour Finals (0–0) ATP World Tour Masters 1000 (1–1) ATP World Tour 500 Series (0–3) ATP World Tour 250 Series (4–2)	Finals by surface Hard (3–2) Grass (0–0) Clay (2–4) Carpet (0–0)

Result	No.	Date	Tournament	Surface	Partner	Opponent	Score
Loss	1.	Apr 2001	Torneo Godó, Barcelona, Spain	Clay	(Spain) Fernando Vicente	(United States) Donald Johnson (United States) Jared Palmer	6–7^{(2–7)}, 4–6
Win	1.	Jan 2004	Chennai Open, Chennai, India	Hard	(Spain) Rafael Nadal	(Israel) Jonathan Erlich (Israel) Andy Ram	7–6^{(7–3)}, 4–6, 6–3
Loss	2.	May 2005	Estoril Open, Estoril, Portugal	Clay	(Argentina) Juan Ignacio Chela	(Czech Republic) František Čermák (Czech Republic) Leoš Friedl	3–6, 4–6
Loss	3.	Jul 2005	Mercedes Cup, Stuttgart, Germany	Clay	(Argentina) Mariano Hood	(Argentina) José Acasuso (Argentina) Sebastián Prieto	6–7^{(4–7)}, 3–6
Win	2.	Apr 2008	Monte-Carlo Masters, Monte Carlo, Monaco	Clay	(Spain) Rafael Nadal	(India) Mahesh Bhupathi (The Bahamas) Mark Knowles	6–3, 6–3
Win	3.	Feb 2009	Brasil Open, Costa do Sauípe, Brazil	Clay	(Spain) Marcel Granollers	(Argentina) Lucas Arnold Ker (Argentina) Juan Mónaco	6–4, 7–5
Loss	4.	Nov 2009	Valencia Open, Valencia, Spain	Hard (i)	(Spain) Marcel Granollers	(Czech Republic) František Čermák (Slovakia) Michal Mertiňák	4–6, 3–6
Loss	5.	Nov 2009	Paris Masters, Paris, France	Hard (i)	(Spain) Marcel Granollers	(Canada) Daniel Nestor (Serbia) Nenad Zimonjić	3–6, 4–6
Win	4.	Jan 2011	Heineken Open, Auckland, New Zealand	Hard	(Spain) Marcel Granollers	(Sweden) Johan Brunström (Australia) Stephen Huss	6–4, 7–6^{(8–6)}
Win	5.	Jan 2013	Brisbane International, Brisbane, Australia	Hard	(Brazil) Marcelo Melo	(United States) Eric Butorac (Australia) Paul Hanley	4–6, 6–1, [10–5]
Loss	6.	May 2017	Estoril Open, Estoril, Portugal	Clay	(Spain) David Marrero	(United States) Ryan Harrison (New Zealand) Michael Venus	5–7, 2–6

== Challenger and Futures finals ==
=== Singles: 14 (8–6) ===
Legend (singles) ATP Challenger Tour (7–5) ITF Futures Tour (1–1)	Titles by surface Hard (0–0) Clay (8–6) Grass (0–0) Carpet (0–0)

Result	W–L	Date	Tournament	Tier	Surface	Opponent	Score
Loss	0–1	Aug 1998	Spain F6, Vigo	Futures	Clay	(Chile) Nicolás Massú	4–6, 2–6
Win	1–1	Sep 1999	Spain F8, Santander	Futures	Clay	(Spain) Albert Montañés	3–6, 7–6, 6–3
Loss	1–2	Apr 2000	Barletta, Italy	Challenger	Clay	(Spain) Germán Puentes Alcañiz	4–6, 6–7^{(3–7)}
Win	2–2	Jun 2000	Espinho, Portugal	Challenger	Clay	(Venezuela) Jimy Szymanski	6–4, 6–2
Win	3–2	Sep 2000	Seville, Spain	Challenger	Clay	(Spain) Óscar Serrano Gámez	6–7^{(4–7)}, 6–1, 6–4
Loss	3–3	Mar 2001	Espinho, Portugal	Challenger	Clay	(Spain) Félix Mantilla	6–7^{(5–7)}, 4–6
Win	4–3	Jun 2012	Caltanissetta, Italy	Challenger	Clay	(Portugal) Gastão Elias	6–3, 6–2
Win	5–3	Jul 2012	Milan, Italy	Challenger	Clay	(Argentina) Martín Alund	6–3, 6–0
Loss	5–4	Sep 2012	Genova, Italy	Challenger	Clay	(Spain) Albert Montañés	4–6, 1–6
Loss	5–5	Sep 2012	Seville, Spain	Challenger	Clay	(Spain) Daniel Gimeno Traver	3–6, 2–6
Loss	5–6	Sep 2017	Alphen, Netherlands	Challenger	Clay	(Estonia) Jürgen Zopp	3–6, 2–6
Win	6–6	May 2018	Lisbon, Portugal	Challenger	Clay	(Chile) Cristian Garín	3–6, 6–3, 6–2
Win	7–6	Jun 2019	Poznań, Poland	Challenger	Clay	(Germany) Rudolf Molleker	5–7, 6–4, 6–1
Win	8–6	Jun 2019	Parma, Italy	Challenger	Clay	(Italy) Federico Gaio	7–6^{(12–10)}, 5–7, 7–6^{(8–6)}

=== Doubles: 5 (3–2) ===
Legend (doubles) ATP Challenger Tour (1–2) ITF Futures Tour (2–0)	Titles by surface Hard (0–0) Clay (3–2) Grass (0–0) Carpet (0–0)

Result	W–L	Date	Tournament	Tier	Surface	Partner	Opponents	Score
Win	1–0	Aug 1998	Spain F6, Vigo	Futures	Clay	(Spain) Pedro Cánovas-García	(Spain) Yon Guezuraga-Cantero (Spain) Ezequiel Vélez-Ortiz	6–4, 6–2
Win	2–0	Sep 1999	Spain F9, Oviedo	Futures	Clay	(Spain) Carlos Martínez-Comet	(Spain) David Morente-Guerrero (Spain) Iván Rodrigo Marín	7–6, 6–1
Loss	2–1	Mar 2000	Lisbon, Portugal	Challenger	Clay	(Spain) Salvador Navarro-Gutiérrez	(Portugal) João Cunha-Silva (Portugal) Nuno Marques	5–7, 4–6
Win	3–1	May 2000	Edinburgh, Great Britain	Challenger	Clay	(United States) Michael Russell	(Germany) Lars Burgsmüller (Czech Republic) Ota Fukárek	6–0, 6–2
Loss	3–2	Sep 2000	Seville, Spain	Challenger	Clay	(Spain) Santiago Ventura	(Spain) Eduardo Nicolás Espin (Spain) Germán Puentes Alcañiz	3–6, 2–6

== Wins over top 10 players ==
- He has a 22–90 record against players who were, at the time the match was played, ranked in the top 10.

Season	1998	1999	2000	2001	2002	2003	2004	2005	2006	2007	2008	2009	2010	2011	2012	2013	2014	2015	2016	2017	2018	2019	2020	2021	2022	Total
Wins	0	0	0	1	2	2	1	3	4	0	2	0	1	1	0	3	2	0	0	0	0	0	0	0	0	22

#	Player	Rank	Event	Surface	Rd	Score
2001
1.	(Spain) Juan Carlos Ferrero	5	US Open, New York, United States	Hard	3R	7–6^{(7–5)}, 4–6, 6–4, 4–6, 7–6^{(7–1)}
2002
2.	(France) Sébastien Grosjean	10	Hamburg, Germany	Clay	2R	7–5, 7–5
3.	(Germany) Tommy Haas	2	Hamburg, Germany	Clay	3R	6–4, 6–4
2003
4.	(Russia) Marat Safin	7	Dubai, United Arab Emirates	Hard	2R	7–5, 4–6, 7–6^{(7–3)}
5.	(Australia) Lleyton Hewitt	1	French Open, Paris, France	Clay	3R	4–6, 1–6, 6–3, 6–2, 6–3
2004
6.	(Spain) Juan Carlos Ferrero	7	Cincinnati, United States	Hard	2R	7–6^{(7–5)}, 4–6, 6–4
2005
7.	(Spain) Carlos Moyá	9	Estoril, Portugal	Clay	SF	6–3, 3–0 ret.
8.	(Russia) Marat Safin	4	French Open, Paris, France	Clay	4R	7–5, 1–6, 6–1, 4–6, 8–6
9.	(Argentina) Gastón Gaudio	8	Cincinnati, United States	Hard	1R	2–6, 6–3, 6–3
2006
10.	(Argentina) David Nalbandian	3	Monte Carlo, Monaco	Clay	3R	5–7, 6–1, 7–5
11.	(Russia) Nikolay Davydenko	5	Bastad, Sweden	Clay	F	6–2, 6–1
12.	(Croatia) Ivan Ljubičić	3	Cincinnati, United States	Hard	QF	7–6^{(8–6)}, 6–2
13.	(United States) James Blake	8	Tennis Masters Cup, Shanghai, China	Hard (i)	RR	6–2, 3–6, 7–5
2008
14.	(Russia) Nikolay Davydenko	4	Rome, Italy	Clay	3R	4–6, 6–2, 7–6^{(7–4)}
15.	(Spain) David Ferrer	4	Bastad, Sweden	Clay	SF	2–6, 6–1, 6–2
2010
16.	(Spain) Fernando Verdasco	10	Bastad, Sweden	Clay	QF	6–4, 6–3
2011
17.	(Spain) Fernando Verdasco	8	Monte Carlo, Monaco	Clay	2R	6–4, 6–3
2013
18.	(Czech Republic) Tomáš Berdych	6	Barcelona, Spain	Clay	3R	3–6, 7–6^{(7–5)}, 6–3
19.	(Switzerland) Stanislas Wawrinka	9	Cincinnati, United States	Hard	2R	7–5, 3–6, 6–3
20.	(Switzerland) Roger Federer	7	US Open, New York, United States	Hard	4R	7–6^{(7–3)}, 6–3, 6–4
2014
21.	(France) Richard Gasquet	9	Australian Open, Melbourne, Australia	Hard	3R	2–6, 7–5, 6–4, 7–6^{(8–6)}
22.	(Serbia) Novak Djokovic	1	Cincinnati, United States	Hard	3R	7–6^{(8–6)}, 7–5

== ATP Tour career earnings ==
Year	Majors	ATP wins	Total wins	Earnings ($)	Money list rank
1998	0	0	0	$4,777
1999	0	0	0	$27,682
2000	0	0	0	$56,944
2001	0	1	1	$411,982
2002	0	0	0	$552,493	36
2003	0	0	0	$697,900	24
2004	0	1	1	$861,507	12
2005	0	0	0	$811,883	21
2006	0	2	2	$1,454,675	7
2007	0	2	2	$1,027,147	12
2008	0	1	1	$893,211	17
2009	0	2	2	$1,273,807	14
2010	0	0	0	$658,359	41
2011	0	1	1	$473,656	66
2012	0	0	0	$146,214	169
2013	0	2	2	$1,214,413	22
2014	0	0	0	$1,474,250
2015	0	0	0	$746,319
2016	0	0	0	$110,242
2017	0	0	0	$274,902
2018	0	0	0	$117,362
2019	0	0	0	$80,419	298
2020	0	0	0	$29,474	347
2021	0	0	0	$49,029	374
2022	0	0	0	$1,270	776
Career*	0	12	12	$13,456,460	49

* Statistics correct as of 21 March 2022.

== Notable exhibitions ==
=== Team competitions ===
Result	No.	Tournament	Surface	Team	Partners	Opponent team	Opponent players	Score
Win	May 2009	Masters Guinot-Mary Cohr, Paris, France	Clay	Team Guinot	(Russia) Marat Safin (C) (Switzerland) Roger Federer (United Kingdom) Andy Murray (Spain) Rafael Nadal (France) Gael Monfils	Team Mary Cohr	(United States) James Blake (C) (Switzerland) Stan Wawrinka (Cyprus) Marcos Baghdatis (France) Arnaud Clement (France) Fabrice Santoro (France) Paul-Henri Mathieu	4–2

== See also ==
- Spain Davis Cup team
- List of Spain Davis Cup team representatives
- Tennis in Spain
- Sport in Spain
