= 2003 Torneo Godó – Singles =

Singles
- 2003 Torneo Godó

Final
- Champion: (Spain) Carlos Moyá
- Runner-up: (Russia) Marat Safin
- Score: 5–7, 6–2, 6–2, 3–0^{r}

Details
- Draw: 56
- Seeds: 16

Events
Singles	Doubles
← 2002 ·	Torneo Godó	· 2004 →

Gastón Gaudio was the defending singles champion of the Torneo Godó men's tennis tournament, but lost in the quarterfinals this year.

Carlos Moyá won the singles title at the 2003 Torneo Godó tennis tournament, defeating Marat Safin, who retired while Moyá held a 5–7, 6–2, 6–2, 3–0 lead in the final.

== Seeds ==
1. (Spain) Juan Carlos Ferrero (semifinals)
2. (Spain) Carlos Moyá (champion)
3. (Spain) Albert Costa (third round)
4. (Russia) Marat Safin (final, retired because of general fatigue)
5. (Thailand) Paradorn Srichaphan (second round)
6. (Argentina) David Nalbandian (second round)
7. (Brazil) Gustavo Kuerten (quarterfinals)
8. (Spain) Àlex Corretja (third round)
9. (Morocco) Younes El Aynaoui (third round, withdrew because of the flu)
10. (Argentina) Gastón Gaudio (quarterfinals)
11. (Chile) Fernando González (first round)
12. (Spain) Tommy Robredo (quarterfinals)
13. (Argentina) Guillermo Coria (second round, retired because of a stomach muscle injury)
14. (Belgium) Xavier Malisse (second round)
15. (Belarus) Max Mirnyi (first round)
16. (Argentina) Agustín Calleri (semifinals)

== Draw ==
=== Key ===
- Q = Qualifier
- WC = Wild card
- LL = Lucky loser
- Alt = Alternate
- ITF = ITF entry
- PR = Protected ranking
- SR = Special ranking
- SE = Special exempt
- JE = Junior exempt
- JR = Junior Accelerator Programme entrant
- CO = College Accelerator Programme entrant
- NG = Next Gen Accelerator Program entrant
- w/o = Walkover
- r = Retired
- d = Defaulted

=== Finals ===
Semifinals
1	(Spain) Juan Carlos Ferrero	4	3
4	(Russia) Marat Safin	6	6
16	(Argentina) Agustín Calleri	6^{2}	2
2	(Spain) Carlos Moyá	7^{7}	6

Final
4	(Russia) Marat Safin	7	2	2	0^{r}
2	(Spain) Carlos Moyá	5	6	6	3

=== Top half ===
==== Section 1 ====
First round
(Belarus) V Voltchkov	4	6	5
(Argentina) F Squillari	6	4	7
Q	(Italy) F Volandri	6	6
WC	(Spain) M López	4	4
WC	(Spain) G Blanco	6	7^{7}
15	(Belarus) M Mirnyi	4	6^{4}
9	(Morocco) Y El Aynaoui	6	2	7^{7}
(Ecuador) N Lapentti	3	6	6^{5}
(Spain) A Portas	6	6
(Spain) D Ferrer	4	3
Q	(Argentina) M Puerta	6^{8}	3
(Spain) F Mantilla	7^{10}	6

Second round
1	(Spain) JC Ferrero	6	6
(Argentina) F Squillari	4	3
Q	(Italy) F Volandri	4	6	6
WC	(Spain) G Blanco	6	3	4
9	(Morocco) Y El Aynaoui	6	6
(Spain) A Portas	4	4
(Spain) F Mantilla	6^{1}	3
7	(Brazil) G Kuerten	7^{7}	6

Third round
1	(Spain) JC Ferrero	6	6
Q	(Italy) F Volandri	4	4
9	(Morocco) Y El Aynaoui
7	(Brazil) G Kuerten	w/o

Quarterfinals
1	(Spain) JC Ferrero	6	6
7	(Brazil) G Kuerten	4	4

==== Section 2 ====
First round
(Slovakia) K Beck	4	7^{7}	6^{4}
Q	(Spain) S Navarro	6	6^{2}	7^{7}
(Finland) J Nieminen	7	7
(Belgium) O Rochus	5	5
(Morocco) H Arazi	5	r
14	(Belgium) X Malisse	7
10	(Argentina) G Gaudio	4	6	6
(Spain) F Vicente	6	2	4
(France) A Dupuis	6	6^{7}	6^{3}
(France) A Clément	4	7^{9}	7^{7}
(Spain) D Sánchez	3	5
Q	(France) C Saulnier	6	0^{r}

Second round
4	(Russia) M Safin	7	6
Q	(Spain) S Navarro	5	2
(Finland) J Nieminen	6	4	6
14	(Belgium) X Malisse	3	6	0
10	(Argentina) G Gaudio	6	6
(France) A Clément	4	3
(Spain) D Sánchez	6	6
5	(Thailand) P Srichaphan	0	2

Third round
4	(Russia) M Safin	6	6
(Finland) J Nieminen	3	3
10	(Argentina) G Gaudio	7	4	6
(Spain) D Sánchez	5	6	1

Quarterfinals
4	(Russia) M Safin	6	4	7
10	(Argentina) G Gaudio	4	6	5

=== Bottom half ===
==== Section 3 ====
First round
WC	(Spain) R Nadal	6
WC	(Costa Rica) JA Marín	0	r
(Spain) F López	6	6
Q	(Argentina) G Etlis	4	4
(France) F Santoro	3	2
12	(Spain) T Robredo	6	6
16	(Argentina) A Calleri	6	7
(Sweden) M Norman	2	5
(Spain) A Martín	5	7	0
(Argentina) JI Chela	7	5	6
(Argentina) M Zabaleta	6	6
(Netherlands) R Sluiter	2	0

Second round
8	(Spain) À Corretja	3	6	6
WC	(Spain) R Nadal	6	2	1
(Spain) F López	4	5
12	(Spain) T Robredo	6	7
16	(Argentina) A Calleri	7^{7}	6
(Argentina) JI Chela	6^{5}	2
(Argentina) M Zabaleta	3	5
3	(Spain) A Costa	6	7

Third round
8	(Spain) À Corretja	6^{4}	7^{7}	2
12	(Spain) T Robredo	7^{7}	6^{1}	6
16	(Argentina) A Calleri	6	6
3	(Spain) A Costa	4	2

Quarterfinals
12	(Spain) T Robredo	7^{7}	4	4
16	(Argentina) A Calleri	6^{1}	6	6

==== Section 4 ====
First round
(Spain) A Montañés	1	2
(Russia) N Davydenko	6	6
(France) P-H Mathieu	0	6	6
Q	(Austria) W Eschauer	6	4	3
(Argentina) J Acasuso	6	3	6
11	(Chile) F González	1	6	3
13	(Argentina) G Coria	6	6
WC	(Spain) F Verdasco	2	2
Q	(Spain) D Pérez	1	0
(Slovakia) D Hrbatý	6	6
(Netherlands) M Verkerk	6^{4}	4
(Romania) A Voinea	7^{7}	6

Second round
6	(Argentina) D Nalbandian	3	6^{4}
(Russia) N Davydenko	6	7^{7}
(France) P-H Mathieu	2	2
(Argentina) J Acasuso	6	6
13	(Argentina) G Coria	3^{r}
(Slovakia) D Hrbatý	4
(Romania) A Voinea	6^{3}	3
2	(Spain) C Moyá	7^{7}	6

Third round
(Russia) N Davydenko	6	6
(Argentina) J Acasuso	4	3
(Slovakia) D Hrbatý	1	7^{7}	3
2	(Spain) C Moyá	6	6^{5}	6

Quarterfinals
(Russia) N Davydenko	3	4
2	(Spain) C Moyá	6	6
