= 2003 Torneo Godó – Doubles =

Doubles
- 2003 Torneo Godó
- 2002 Champion: (Australia) Michael Hill; (Czech Republic) Daniel Vacek

Final
- Champion: (United States) Bob Bryan; (United States) Mike Bryan
- Runner-up: (South Africa) Chris Haggard; (South Africa) Robbie Koenig
- Score: 6–4, 6–3

Events
Singles	Doubles
← 2002 ·	Torneo Godó	· 2004 →

Michael Hill and Daniel Vacek were the defending champions but did not compete that year.

Bob Bryan and Mike Bryan won in the final 6–4, 6–3 against Chris Haggard and Robbie Koenig.

== Seeds ==
Champion seeds are indicated in bold text while text in italics indicates the round in which those seeds were eliminated. All eight seeded teams received byes to the second round.

1. n/a
2. (United States) **Bob Bryan** / (United States) **Mike Bryan (champions)**
3. (Czech Republic) Martin Damm / (Czech Republic) Cyril Suk (quarterfinals)
4. (United States) Donald Johnson / (Zimbabwe) Kevin Ullyett (second round)
5. (Australia) Joshua Eagle / (United States) Jared Palmer (quarterfinals)
6. (Czech Republic) Tomáš Cibulec / (Czech Republic) Pavel Vízner (quarterfinals)
7. (South Africa) Chris Haggard / (South Africa) Robbie Koenig (final)
8. (Czech Republic) František Čermák / (Czech Republic) Leoš Friedl (second round)

== Draw ==
=== Key ===
- Q = Qualifier
- WC = Wild card
- LL = Lucky loser
- Alt = Alternate
- SE = Special exempt
- PR = Protected ranking
- ITF = ITF entry
- JE = Junior exempt
- w/o = Walkover
- r = Retired
- d = Defaulted
- SR = Special ranking

=== Final ===
Final

7
- (South Africa) Chris Haggard
- (South Africa) Robbie Koenig
4
3

2
- (United States) **Bob Bryan**
- (United States) **Mike Bryan**
**6**
**6**

=== Top half ===
First round

Second round

Quarterfinals

Semifinals

ALT
- (Finland) J Nieminen
- (Belarus) V Voltchkov
2
1
r

- (Argentina) L Arnold
- (Argentina) M Hood
3
2

- (Australia) **A Kratzmann**
- (United States) **J Tarango**
**6**
**4**

- (Australia) **A Kratzmann**
- (United States) **J Tarango**
**6**
**6**

- (Australia) **A Kratzmann**
- (United States) **J Tarango**
**6**
**1**

- (Spain) A Portas
- (Argentina) A Schneiter
**6**
3
6^{2}

- (Ecuador) N Lapentti
- (France) F Santoro
4
1
r

- (Ecuador) **N Lapentti**
- (France) **F Santoro**
3
**6**
**7^{7}**

- (Ecuador) **N Lapentti**
- (France) **F Santoro**
6^{8}
**6**
**7^{9}**

8
- (Czech Republic) F Čermák
- (Czech Republic) L Friedl
**7^{10}**
3
6^{7}

- (Australia) A Kratzmann
- (United States) J Tarango
4
4

7
- (South Africa) **C Haggard**
- (South Africa) **R Koenig**
**6**
**6**

3
- (Czech Republic) **M Damm**
- (Czech Republic) **C Suk**
6^{5}
**6**
**6**

ALT
- (Argentina) **J I Chela**
- (Argentina) **M Zabaleta**
**6**
**6**

ALT
- (Argentina) J I Chela
- (Argentina) M Zabaleta
**7^{7}**
4
3

WC
- (Spain) F Mantilla
- (Spain) F Vicente
4
4

3
- (Czech Republic) M Damm
- (Czech Republic) C Suk
6^{5}
2

- (Spain) J C Ferrero
- (Spain) T Robredo
3
**6**
3

7
- (South Africa) **C Haggard**
- (South Africa) **R Koenig**
**7^{7}**
**6**

- (Czech Republic) **P Pála**
- (Serbia and Montenegro) **N Zimonjić**
**6**
1
**6**

- (Czech Republic) P Pála
- (Serbia and Montenegro) N Zimonjić
3
6^{5}

7
- (South Africa) **C Haggard**
- (South Africa) **R Koenig**
**6**
**7^{7}**

=== Bottom half ===
First round

Second round

Quarterfinals

Semifinals

6
- (Czech Republic) **T Cibulec**
- (Czech Republic) **P Vízner**
**w/o**

- (Brazil) G Kuerten
- (Russia) M Safin
4
3

- (Argentina) G Gaudio
- (Argentina) D Nalbandian

- (Argentina) **G Gaudio**
- (Argentina) **D Nalbandian**
**6**
**6**

6
- (Czech Republic) T Cibulec
- (Czech Republic) P Vízner
3
2

- (Argentina) A Calleri
- (Morocco) Y El Aynaoui
3
4

- (Argentina) **G Etlis**
- (Argentina) **M Rodríguez**
**6**
**6**

- (Argentina) **G Etlis**
- (Argentina) **M Rodríguez**
**6**
**6**

- (Argentina) **G Etlis**
- (Argentina) **M Rodríguez**
**6**
**7**

4
- (United States) D Johnson
- (Zimbabwe) K Ullyett
3
5

- (Argentina) G Etlis
- (Argentina) M Rodríguez
4
**7^{7}**
6^{3}

2
- (United States) **B Bryan**
- (United States) **M Bryan**
**6**
6^{5}
**7^{7}**

5
- (Australia) **J Eagle**
- (United States) **J Palmer**
**6**
**6**

- (Czech Republic) **P Luxa**
- (Czech Republic) **D Škoch**
**6**
5
**6**

- (Czech Republic) P Luxa
- (Czech Republic) D Škoch
2
4

- (Slovakia) D Hrbatý
- (Thailand) P Srichaphan
4
**7**
4

5
- (Australia) J Eagle
- (United States) J Palmer
3
4

- (South Africa) **D Adams**
- (Germany) **M Kohlmann**
**6**
**6**

2
- (United States) **B Bryan**
- (United States) **M Bryan**
**6**
**6**

WC
- (Spain) F López
- (Spain) R Nadal
3
4

- (South Africa) D Adams
- (Germany) M Kohlmann
1
2

2
- (United States) **B Bryan**
- (United States) **M Bryan**
**6**
**6**
