= 2001 Grand Prix Hassan II – Doubles =

Doubles
- 2001 Grand Prix Hassan II

Final
- Champions: (Australia) Michael Hill (United States) Jeff Tarango
- Runners-up: (Argentina) Pablo Albano (Australia) David Macpherson
- Score: 7–6^{(7–2)}, 6–3

Details
- Draw: 16
- Seeds: 4

Events
Singles	Doubles
- Grand Prix Hassan II

Arnaud Clément and Sébastien Grosjean were the defending champions but did not compete that year.

Michael Hill and Jeff Tarango won in the final 7–6^{(7–2)}, 6–3 against Pablo Albano and David Macpherson.

== Seeds ==
1. (Australia) Michael Hill / (United States) Jeff Tarango (champions)
2. (Argentina) Pablo Albano / (Australia) David Macpherson (final)
3. (France) Julien Boutter / (Argentina) Daniel Orsanic (first round)
4. (Sweden) Simon Aspelin / (Sweden) Johan Landsberg (first round)

== Draw ==
Key

- Q = Qualifier
- WC = Wild card
- LL = Lucky loser
- Alt = Alternate
- ITF = ITF entry
- PR = Protected ranking
- SR = Special ranking
- SE = Special exempt
- JE = Junior exempt
- JR = Junior Accelerator Programme entrant
- CO = College Accelerator Programme entrant
- NG = Next Gen Accelerator Program entrant
- w/o = Walkover
- r = Retired
- d = Defaulted

First round
1	(Australia) M Hill (United States) J Tarango	7	7
(Germany) M-K Goellner (Kazakhstan) Y Schukin	5	5
(Spain) G Puentes (Spain) J Velasco Jr.	7^{7}	1	1
WC	(Morocco) K Alami (Spain) Á Calatrava	6^{4}	6	6
3	(France) J Boutter (Argentina) D Orsanic	4	2
(Germany) K Braasch (Germany) J Knippschild	6	6
(United States) D Bowen (United States) M Sprengelmeyer	4	6^{3}
(Czech Republic) P Luxa (Czech Republic) D Škoch	6	7^{7}
(Italy) C Brandi (Italy) A Schneiter	7^{7}	6
WC	(Morocco) Y El Aynaoui (Spain) F Vicente	6^{5}	2
(Argentina) M Hood (Argentina) S Prieto	2	6	7
4	(Sweden) S Aspelin (Sweden) J Landsberg	6	2	5
WC	(Morocco) M Dakki (Morocco) M El Aarej	1	1
Q	(Argentina) G Cañas (Germany) R Schüttler	6	6
(Italy) A Gaudenzi (Georgia (country)) I Labadze	3	4
2	(Argentina) P Albano (Australia) D Macpherson	6	6

Quarterfinals
1	(Australia) M Hill (United States) J Tarango	w/o
WC	(Morocco) K Alami (Spain) Á Calatrava
(Germany) K Braasch (Germany) J Knippschild	6	6
(Czech Republic) P Luxa (Czech Republic) D Škoch	1	2
(Italy) C Brandi (Italy) A Schneiter	6	2	6
(Argentina) M Hood (Argentina) S Prieto	3	6	3
Q	(Argentina) G Cañas (Germany) R Schüttler	4	1
2	(Argentina) P Albano (Australia) D Macpherson	6	6

Semifinals
1	(Australia) M Hill (United States) J Tarango	4	6	6
(Germany) K Braasch (Germany) J Knippschild	6	3	3
(Italy) C Brandi (Italy) A Schneiter	2	3
2	(Argentina) P Albano (Australia) D Macpherson	6	6

Final
1	(Australia) M Hill (United States) J Tarango	7^{7}	6
2	(Argentina) P Albano (Australia) D Macpherson	6^{2}	3
