= 2004 Open SEAT Godó – Doubles =

Doubles
- 2004 Open SEAT Godó
- 2003 Champions: (United States) Bob Bryan (United States) Mike Bryan

Final
- Champions: (The Bahamas) Mark Knowles (Canada) Daniel Nestor
- Runners-up: (Argentina) Mariano Hood (Argentina) Sebastián Prieto
- Score: 4–6, 6–3, 6–4

Events
Singles	Doubles
← 2003 ·	Open SEAT Godó	· 2005 →

Bob Bryan and Mike Bryan were the defending champions but did not compete that year.

Mark Knowles and Daniel Nestor won in the final 4–6, 6–3, 6–4 against Mariano Hood and Sebastián Prieto.

== Seeds ==
Champion seeds are indicated in bold text while text in italics indicates the round in which those seeds were eliminated. All eight seeded teams received byes to the second round.

1. (India) Mahesh Bhupathi / (Australia) Paul Hanley (quarterfinals)
2. (The Bahamas) **Mark Knowles** / (Canada) **Daniel Nestor (champions)**
3. (Czech Republic) Martin Damm / (Czech Republic) Cyril Suk (second round)
4. (Argentina) Gastón Etlis / (Argentina) Martín Rodríguez (second round)
5. (Israel) Jonathan Erlich / (Israel) Andy Ram (quarterfinals)
6. (Czech Republic) František Čermák / (Czech Republic) Leoš Friedl (semifinals)
7. (Argentina) Mariano Hood / (Argentina) Sebastián Prieto (final)
8. (Italy) Massimo Bertolini / (South Africa) Robbie Koenig (second round)

== Draw ==
=== Key ===
- Q = Qualifier
- WC = Wild card
- LL = Lucky loser
- Alt = Alternate
- SE = Special exempt
- PR = Protected ranking
- ITF = ITF entry
- JE = Junior exempt
- w/o = Walkover
- r = Retired
- d = Defaulted
- SR = Special ranking

=== Final ===
Final
7	(Argentina) Mariano Hood (Argentina) Sebastián Prieto	**6**	3	4
2	(The Bahamas) **Mark Knowles** (Canada) **Daniel Nestor**	4	**6**	**6**

=== Top half ===
First round
(United States) G Oliver (United States) T Parrott	4	2
(Argentina) **L Arnold** (Argentina) **A Calleri**	**6**	**6**
(Australia) A Fisher (Australia) S Huss	3	6^{6}
(Spain) **F López** (Spain) **F Verdasco**	**6**	**7^{8}**
(Czech Republic) T Berdych (Slovakia) D Hrbatý	**6**	3	2
(Austria) **J Melzer** (United States) **J Thomas**	3	**6**	**6**
(Chile) **F González** (Chile) **N Massú**	**6**	**7^{7}**
(Argentina) J I Chela (Argentina) G Gaudio	2	6^{5}

Second round
1	(India) **M Bhupathi** (Australia) **P Hanley**	3	**6**	**6**
(Argentina) L Arnold (Argentina) A Calleri	**6**	0	3
(Spain) **F López** (Spain) **F Verdasco**	**7^{7}**	4	**6**
8	(Italy) M Bertolini (South Africa) R Koenig	6^{3}	**6**	2
4	(Argentina) G Etlis (Argentina) M Rodríguez	3	6^{1}
(Austria) **J Melzer** (United States) **J Thomas**	**6**	**7^{7}**
(Chile) F González (Chile) N Massú	**6**	0	r
7	(Argentina) **M Hood** (Argentina) **S Prieto**	2	**1**

Quarterfinals
1	(India) M Bhupathi (Australia) P Hanley	**6**	4	2
(Spain) **F López** (Spain) **F Verdasco**	3	**6**	**6**
(Austria) J Melzer (United States) J Thomas	**7^{7}**	2	2
7	(Argentina) **M Hood** (Argentina) **S Prieto**	6^{2}	**6**	**6**

Semifinals
(Spain) F López (Spain) F Verdasco	**7^{8}**	6^{8}	3
7	(Argentina) **M Hood** (Argentina) **S Prieto**	6^{6}	**7^{10}**	**6**

=== Bottom half ===
First round
WC	(Spain) D Pérez (Spain) T Robredo	4	6^{6}
WC	(Spain) **M López** (Spain) **F Vicente**	**6**	**7^{8}**
(Spain) D Ferrer (Spain) R Ramírez Hidalgo	**6**	4	2
(Argentina) **G Cañas** (Argentina) **M García**	4	**6**	**6**
(Brazil) **G Kuerten** (Argentina) **M Zabaleta**	4	**7^{9}**	**6**
(United States) J-M Gambill (South Africa) C Haggard	**6**	6^{7}	4
(Brazil) A Sá (Brazil) F Saretta	2	2
(Spain) **J I Carrasco** (Spain) **Á López Morón**	**6**	**6**

Second round
6	(Czech Republic) **F Čermák** (Czech Republic) **L Friedl**	**7^{8}**	**6**
WC	(Spain) M López (Spain) F Vicente	6^{6}	2
(Argentina) **G Cañas** (Argentina) **M García**	**7^{7}**	**6**
3	(Czech Republic) M Damm (Czech Republic) C Suk	6^{3}	3
5	(Israel) **J Erlich** (Israel) **A Ram**	**6**	**6**
(Brazil) G Kuerten (Argentina) M Zabaleta	3	2
(Spain) J I Carrasco (Spain) Á López Morón	6^{0}	2
2	(The Bahamas) **M Knowles** (Canada) **D Nestor**	**7^{7}**	**6**

Quarterfinals
6	(Czech Republic) **F Čermák** (Czech Republic) **L Friedl**	**6**	**6**
(Argentina) G Cañas (Argentina) M García	2	4
5	(Israel) J Erlich (Israel) A Ram	1	6^{5}
2	(The Bahamas) **M Knowles** (Canada) **D Nestor**	**6**	**7^{7}**

Semifinals
6	(Czech Republic) F Čermák (Czech Republic) L Friedl	2	2
2	(The Bahamas) **M Knowles** (Canada) **D Nestor**	**6**	**6**
