= 2001 Grand Prix Hassan II =

- Date: 9–15 April
- Edition: 17th
- Category: International Series
- Draw: 32S / 16D
- Surface: Clay / outdoor
- Location: Casablanca, Morocco
- Venue: Complexe Al Amal

Champions

Singles
- (Argentina) Guillermo Cañas

Doubles
- (Australia) Michael Hill / (United States) Jeff Tarango
- Grand Prix Hassan II

The 2001 Grand Prix Hassan II was a men's tennis tournament played on outdoor clay courts at the Complexe Al Amal in Casablanca, Morocco that was part of the International Series of the 2001 ATP Tour. It was the 17th edition of the tournament and was held from 9 April until 15 April 2001. Guillermo Cañas, who entered the main draw as a qualifier, won the singles title.

== Finals ==
=== Singles ===
(Argentina) Guillermo Cañas defeated (Spain) Tommy Robredo 7–5, 6–2

- It was Cañas's 1st singles title of the year and the 2nd of his career.

=== Doubles ===
(Australia) Michael Hill / (United States) Jeff Tarango defeated (Argentina) Pablo Albano / (Australia) David Macpherson 7–6^{(7–2)}, 6–3

- It was Hill's only title of the year and the 2nd of his career. It was Tarango's only title of the year and the 16th of his career.
