= Eduardo Nicolás =

Spanish tennis player (born 1972)

- Country (sports): Spain
- Born: 22 September 1972 (age 52); Barcelona, Spain
- Height: 1.73 m (5 ft 8 in)
- Turned pro: 1992
- Plays: Right-handed
- Prize money: $117,508

Singles
- Career record: 3–4
- Career titles: 0
- Highest ranking: No. 146 (20 March 2000)

Doubles
- Career record: 7–17
- Career titles: 0
- Highest ranking: No. 97 (17 January 2000)

Grand Slam doubles results
- French Open: 1R (1999, 2000)
- Wimbledon: 1R (1999, 2000)
- US Open: 1R (1999)

Eduardo Nicolás Espin (born 22 September 1972) is a former professional tennis player from Spain.

Nicolas played most of his doubles career beside Germán Puentes, his partner in all five of his Grand Slam appearances. They failed to win a single Grand Slam match but did reach the semi-finals of the Swedish Open in 1999 and win six Challenger titles.

As a singles player he was a quarter-finalist in the 1999 Prague Open, defeating world number 65 Ján Krošlák and German Markus Hantschk. He was eliminated in the quarter-finals by his doubles partner, Puentes.

== Challenger titles ==
=== Doubles: (6) ===
No.	Year	Tournament	Surface	Partner	Opponents	Score
1.	1998	Montauban, France	Clay	(Spain) Germán Puentes	(Netherlands) Edwin Kempes (Netherlands) Rogier Wassen	7–6, 7–6
2.	1998	Budva, Yugoslavia	Clay	(Spain) Germán Puentes	(Portugal) Emanuel Couto (Portugal) João Cunha Silva	3–6, 6–1, 6–3
3.	1998	Skopje, Macedonia	Clay	(Spain) Germán Puentes	(Russia) Andrei Merinov (Russia) Andrei Stoliarov	7–5, 3–6, 7–6
4.	1999	Barcelona, Spain	Clay	(Spain) Germán Puentes	(Spain) Alberto Martín (Spain) Javier Sánchez	7–6^{(7–1)}, 7–6^{(7–5)}
5.	2000	Fürth, Germany	Clay	(Spain) Germán Puentes	(United States) Devin Bowen (United States) Brandon Coupe	6–4, 6–2
6.	2000	Sevilla, Spain	Clay	(Spain) Germán Puentes	(Spain) Tommy Robredo (Spain) Santiago Ventura	6–3, 6–2
