= 2004 Open SEAT Godó =

- Date: 24 April – 2 May
- Edition: 52nd
- Category: International Series Gold
- Draw: 56S / 28D
- Prize money: $891,000
- Surface: Clay / outdoor
- Location: Barcelona, Spain
- Venue: Real Club de Tenis Barcelona

Champions

Singles
- (Spain) Tommy Robredo

Doubles
- (The Bahamas) Mark Knowles / (Canada) Daniel Nestor
- Torneo Godó

The 2004 Open SEAT Godó, also known as the Torneo Godó, was a men's professional tennis tournament that was part of the International Series Gold of the 2004 ATP Tour. It was the 52nd edition of the Torneo Godó and took place from 24 April until 2 May 2004 in Barcelona, Spain. Eighth-seeded Tommy Robredo won the singles title.

== Finals ==
=== Singles ===
(Spain) Tommy Robredo defeated (Argentina) Gastón Gaudio 6–3, 4–6, 6–2, 3–6, 6–3

- It was Robredo's 1st singles title of the year and the 2nd of his career.

=== Doubles ===
(The Bahamas) Mark Knowles / (Canada) Daniel Nestor defeated (Argentina) Mariano Hood / (Argentina) Sebastián Prieto 4–6, 6–3, 6–4
