= 2004 Open SEAT Godó – Singles =

Singles
- 2004 Open SEAT Godó

Final
- Champion: (Spain) Tommy Robredo
- Runner-up: (Argentina) Gastón Gaudio
- Score: 6–3, 4–6, 6–2, 3–6, 6–3

Details
- Draw: 56
- Seeds: 16

Events
Singles	Doubles
← 2003 ·	Open SEAT Godó	· 2005 →

Carlos Moyá was the defending champion but lost in the third round to Gastón Gaudio.

Tommy Robredo won in the final 6–3, 4–6, 6–2, 3–6, 6–3 against Gaudio.

== Seeds ==
A champion seed is indicated in bold text while text in italics indicates the round in which that seed was eliminated. The top eight seeds received a bye to the second round.

1. n/a
2. (Spain) Carlos Moyá (third round)
3. (Argentina) David Nalbandian (quarterfinals)
4. (Chile) Nicolás Massú (second round)
5. (Chile) Fernando González (quarterfinals)
6. (Brazil) Gustavo Kuerten (quarterfinals)
7. (Argentina) Agustín Calleri (quarterfinals)
8. (Spain) **Tommy Robredo (champion)**
9. (Argentina) Juan Ignacio Chela (second round)
10. (Spain) Feliciano López (third round)
11. n/a
12. (Slovakia) Dominik Hrbatý (first round)
13. (Argentina) Gastón Gaudio (final)
14. (Spain) Albert Costa (first round)
15. (Spain) Félix Mantilla (second round)
16. (Argentina) Mariano Zabaleta (third round)
17. (Brazil) Flávio Saretta (second round)

== Draw ==
=== Key ===
- Q = Qualifier
- WC = Wild card
- LL = Lucky loser
- Alt = Alternate
- SE = Special exempt
- PR = Protected ranking
- ITF = ITF entry
- JE = Junior exempt
- w/o = Walkover
- r = Retired
- d = Defaulted
- SR = Special ranking

=== Finals ===
Semifinals
8	(Spain) **Tommy Robredo**	**6**	**6**
Q	(Belgium) Kristof Vliegen	4	3
WC	(Spain) Albert Montañés	3	4
13	(Argentina) **Gastón Gaudio**	**6**	**6**

Final
8	(Spain) **Tommy Robredo**	**6**	4	**6**	3	**6**
13	(Argentina) Gastón Gaudio	3	**6**	2	**6**	3

=== Top half ===
==== Section 1 ====
First round
(Ecuador) **N Lapentti**	**7**	**6**
(Austria) J Melzer	5	1
(Croatia) I Karlović	4	4
(Spain) **F Vicente**	**6**	**6**
LL	(Italy) M Dell'Acqua	1	4
16	(Argentina) **M Zabaleta**	**6**	**6**
LL	(Australia) **P Luczak**	**7**	**6**
(Spain) Ó Hernández	5	3
(Spain) **F Verdasco**	**6**	**6**
(France) N Mahut	2	3
(Netherlands) J van Lottum	6^{2}	r
(Slovakia) **K Beck**	**7^{7}**

Second round
5	(Chile) **F González**	**7^{7}**	**6**
(Ecuador) N Lapentti	6^{1}	0
(Spain) F Vicente	0	3
16	(Argentina) **M Zabaleta**	**6**	**6**
LL	(Australia) P Luczak	1	r
(Spain) **F Verdasco**	**5**
(Slovakia) K Beck	4	4
8	(Spain) **T Robredo**	**6**	**6**

Third round
5	(Chile) **F González**	**7^{7}**	3	**6**
16	(Argentina) M Zabaleta	6^{2}	**6**	2
(Spain) F Verdasco	4	**7**	4
8	(Spain) **T Robredo**	**6**	5	**6**

Quarterfinals
5	(Chile) F González	**6**	5	6^{2}
8	(Spain) **T Robredo**	4	**7**	**7^{7}**

==== Section 2 ====
First round
(Spain) D Ferrer	4	**7^{10}**	4
(United States) **T Martin**	**6**	6^{8}	**6**
(Russia) I Andreev	6^{5}	**6**	6^{3}
WC	(Spain) **M López**	**7^{7}**	3	**7^{7}**
Q	(Switzerland) S Wawrinka	6^{2}	0
15	(Spain) **F Mantilla**	**7^{7}**	**6**
17	(Brazil) **F Saretta**	4	**7**	**6**
Q	(Spain) S Navarro	**6**	5	4
(Austria) S Koubek	4	2
Q	(Belgium) **K Vliegen**	**6**	**6**
Q	(France) **O Patience**	6^{1}	**6**	**6**
(Italy) D Sanguinetti	**7^{7}**	4	3

Second round
3	(Argentina) **D Nalbandian**	**6**	**6**
(United States) T Martin	2	4
WC	(Spain) **M López**	**6**	**7^{7}**
15	(Spain) F Mantilla	4	6^{4}
17	(Brazil) F Saretta	2	**6**	3
Q	(Belgium) **K Vliegen**	**6**	1	**6**
Q	(France) **O Patience**	1	**6**	**6**
9	(Argentina) J I Chela	**6**	4	4

Third round
3	(Argentina) **D Nalbandian**	**6**	**6**
WC	(Spain) M López	4	4
Q	(Belgium) **K Vliegen**	**6**	**6**
Q	(France) O Patience	3	4

Quarterfinals
3	(Argentina) D Nalbandian	6^{1}	4
Q	(Belgium) **K Vliegen**	**7^{7}**	**6**

=== Bottom half ===
==== Section 3 ====
First round
(Czech Republic) **T Berdych**	**6**	**6**
(Spain) G Blanco	3	1
(Spain) **D Sánchez**	**6**	**6**
(Russia) D Tursunov	2	4
(United States) J-M Gambill	5	5
10	(Spain) **F López**	**7**	**7**
14	(Spain) A Costa	4	6^{3}
WC	(Spain) **A Montañés**	**6**	**7^{7}**
(Spain) À Corretja	**6**	3	4
WC	(Spain) **N Almagro**	3	**6**	**6**
(Argentina) J Acasuso	1	2	r
(Spain) **A Martín**	**6**	**1**

Second round
7	(Argentina) **A Calleri**	**6**	**7^{9}**
(Czech Republic) T Berdych	1	6^{7}
(Spain) D Sánchez	3	**6**	4
10	(Spain) **F López**	**6**	2	**6**
WC	(Spain) **A Montañés**	3	**6**	**6**
WC	(Spain) N Almagro	**6**	2	2
(Spain) **A Martín**	**6**	5	**6**
4	(Chile) N Massú	3	**7**	2

Third round
7	(Argentina) **A Calleri**	**6**	**7**
(Spain) F López	3	5
WC	(Spain) **A Montañés**	**6**	**6**
(Spain) A Martín	3	2

Quarterfinals
7	(Argentina) A Calleri	**6**	6^{3}	3
WC	(Spain) **A Montañés**	4	**7^{7}**	**6**

==== Section 4 ====
First round
WC	(Sweden) **T Johansson**	**7**	**6**
Q	(Spain) D Pérez	5	3
(Argentina) **G Cañas**	**6**	**6**
Q	(Costa Rica) J A Marín	4	2
(Croatia) **M Ančić**	6^{3}	**7^{7}**	**7**
12	(Slovakia) D Hrbatý	**7^{7}**	6^{5}	5
13	(Argentina) **G Gaudio**	**6**	**6**
(Netherlands) R Sluiter	3	3
(Germany) **A Popp**	**6**	**6**
(Spain) A Portas	4	2
(Spain) R Ramírez Hidalgo	4	**6**	6^{5}
Q	(Germany) **D Elsner**	**6**	1	**7^{7}**

Second round
WC/6	(Brazil) **G Kuerten**	**7^{7}**	4	**7^{7}**
WC	(Sweden) T Johansson	6^{5}	**6**	6^{5}
(Argentina) **G Cañas**	**6**	**6**
(Croatia) M Ančić	4	4
13	(Argentina) **G Gaudio**	**6**	**7^{7}**
(Germany) A Popp	0	6^{4}
Q	(Germany) D Elsner	4	2
2	(Spain) **C Moyá**	**6**	**6**

Third round
WC/6	(Brazil) **G Kuerten**	**6**	6^{1}	**6**
(Argentina) G Cañas	3	**7^{7}**	3
13	(Argentina) **G Gaudio**	**6**	**6**
2	(Spain) C Moyá	4	4

Quarterfinals
WC/6	(Brazil) G Kuerten	**6**	6^{5}	1/r
13	(Argentina) **G Gaudio**	3	**7^{7}**	**2**
