= 2001 Grand Prix Hassan II – Singles =

Singles
- 2001 Grand Prix Hassan II

Final
- Champion: (Argentina) Guillermo Cañas
- Runner-up: (Spain) Tommy Robredo
- Score: 7–5, 6–2

Details
- Draw: 32
- Seeds: 8

Events
Singles	Doubles
- Grand Prix Hassan II

Fernando Vicente was the defending champion but lost in the first round to Mariano Zabaleta.

Guillermo Cañas won in the final 7–5, 6–2 against Tommy Robredo.

== Seeds ==
1. (Spain) Fernando Vicente (first round)
2. (Argentina) Mariano Puerta (first round)
3. (Germany) Rainer Schüttler (first round)
4. (Sweden) Andreas Vinciguerra (first round)
5. (Spain) Álex Calatrava (second round)
6. (Morocco) Younes El Aynaoui (semifinals)
7. (France) Arnaud di Pasquale (first round)
8. (Switzerland) ~~Marc Rosset~~ (withdrew)

== Draw ==
Key

- Q = Qualifier
- WC = Wild card
- LL = Lucky loser
- Alt = Alternate
- ITF = ITF entry
- PR = Protected ranking
- SR = Special ranking
- SE = Special exempt
- JE = Junior exempt
- JR = Junior Accelerator Programme entrant
- CO = College Accelerator Programme entrant
- NG = Next Gen Accelerator Program entrant
- w/o = Walkover
- r = Retired
- d = Defaulted

=== Finals ===
Semifinals
6	(Morocco) Younes El Aynaoui	6	3	6^{4}
(Spain) Tommy Robredo	3	6	7^{7}
Q	(Argentina) Guillermo Cañas	6	7^{7}
(Spain) Sergi Bruguera	0	6^{4}

Final
(Spain) Tommy Robredo	5	2
Q	(Argentina) Guillermo Cañas	7	6

=== Top half ===
First round
1	(Spain) F Vicente	4	6	4
(Argentina) M Zabaleta	6	2	6
(Chile) N Massú	7^{7}	1	7
LL	(Spain) G Blanco	6^{1}	6	5
(Morocco) K Alami	6	6^{0}	6
LL	(Czech Republic) P Kralert	2	7^{7}	2
WC	(Morocco) C Belal	3	2
6	(Morocco) Y El Aynaoui	6	6
3	(Germany) R Schüttler	6	5	5
(Armenia) S Sargsian	4	7	7
(Spain) G Puentes	2	7^{11}	6
(France) A Dupuis	6	6^{9}	2
Q	(France) O Malcor	7^{7}	3	0
(Spain) T Robredo	6^{3}	6	6
(Czech Republic) J Vaněk	6	7^{7}
Q	(Czech Republic) J Vacek	2	6^{3}

Second round
(Argentina) M Zabaleta	6	3	6
(Chile) N Massú	4	6	1
(Morocco) K Alami	6	2	1
6	(Morocco) Y El Aynaoui	4	6	6
(Armenia) S Sargsian	1	6	5
(Spain) G Puentes	6	2	7
(Spain) T Robredo	4	6	6
(Czech Republic) J Vaněk	6	4	4

Quarter-finals
(Argentina) M Zabaleta	4	2
6	(Morocco) Y El Aynaoui	6	6
(Spain) G Puentes	0	1
(Spain) T Robredo	6	6

Semi-finals
6	(Morocco) Y El Aynaoui	6	3	6^{4}
(Spain) T Robredo	3	6	7^{7}

=== Bottom half ===
First round
7	(France) A di Pasquale	5	6	3
(Germany) J Knippschild	7	3	6
WC	(Morocco) M Tahiri	0	2
Q	(Argentina) G Cañas	6	6
(Germany) C Vinck	1	3
(France) J Golmard	6	6
(Italy) A Gaudenzi	6	6
4	(Sweden) A Vinciguerra	4	4
5	(Spain) Á Calatrava	6	6
(Russia) A Stoliarov	2	2
(Germany) M Hantschk	2	2
Q	(Hungary) A Sávolt	6	6
(Spain) S Bruguera	6	7
WC	(Morocco) M El Aarej	4	5
(Belgium) O Rochus	2	6	6
2	(Argentina) M Puerta	6	3	4

Second round
(Germany) J Knippschild	0	2
Q	(Argentina) G Cañas	6	6
(France) J Golmard	4	4
(Italy) A Gaudenzi	6	6
5	(Spain) Á Calatrava	6^{3}	4
Q	(Hungary) A Sávolt	7^{7}	6
(Spain) S Bruguera	6	6
(Belgium) O Rochus	1	3

Quarter-finals
Q	(Argentina) G Cañas	6	6
(Italy) A Gaudenzi	2	0
Q	(Hungary) A Sávolt	3	6^{7}
(Spain) S Bruguera	6	7^{9}

Semi-finals
Q	(Argentina) G Cañas	6	7^{7}
(Spain) S Bruguera	0	6^{4}
