= 2003 Torneo Godó =

- Date: 21–27 April
- Edition: 51st
- Category: International Series Gold
- Draw: 56S / 24D
- Prize money: $900,000
- Surface: Clay / outdoor
- Location: Barcelona, Spain
- Venue: Real Club de Tenis Barcelona

Champions

Singles
- (Spain) Carlos Moyá

Doubles
- (United States) Bob Bryan / (United States) Mike Bryan
← 2002 ·	Torneo Godó	· 2004 →

The 2003 Torneo Godówas a men's tennis tournament played on outdoor clay courts. It was the 51st edition of the Torneo Godó, and was part of the International Series Gold of the 2003 ATP Tour. It took place at the Real Club de Tenis Barcelona in Barcelona, Spain, from 21 April until 27 April 2003. Second-seeded Carlos Moyá won the singles title after a retirement by Marat Safin in the final.

This event also carried the joint denominations of the Campeonatos Internacionales de España or Spanish International Championships that was hosted at this venue and location, and was 36th edition to be held in Barcelona, and the Open Seat Godó' (sponsorship name) and is the 8th edition branded under that name.

== Finals ==
=== Singles ===
(Spain) Carlos Moyá defeated (Russia) Marat Safin, 5–7, 6–2, 6–2, 3–0, ret.

- It was Moya's 2nd singles title of the year, and his 13th overall.

=== Doubles ===
(United States) Bob Bryan / (United States) Mike Bryan defeated (South Africa) Chris Haggard / (South Africa) Robbie Koenig, 6–4, 6–3
