= Germán Puentes =

Spanish tennis player (born 1972)

- Country (sports): Spain
- Born: 18 December 1972 (age 52); Barcelona, Spain
- Height: 1.73 m (5 ft 8 in)
- Turned pro: 1995
- Plays: Right-handed (one handed-backhand)
- Prize money: $481,369

Singles
- Career record: 13–28
- Career titles: 0
- Highest ranking: No. 90 (20 November 2000)

Grand Slam singles results
- Australian Open: 1R (2001)
- French Open: 1R (1999)
- Wimbledon: 2R (2001)
- US Open: 1R (1999, 2001)

Doubles
- Career record: 14–29
- Career titles: 0
- Highest ranking: No. 73 (22 November 1999)

Grand Slam doubles results
- Australian Open: 2R (2001)
- French Open: 1R (1999, 2000, 2001)
- Wimbledon: 1R (1999, 2000)
- US Open: 1R (1999, 2001)

Germán Puentes Alcañiz (born 18 December 1972) is a former professional tennis player from Spain.

== Career ==
Puentes was the runner-up in the 1989 Spanish Junior Championships.

The Spaniard appeared in the main singles draw of five Grand Slams during his career but only once made the second round, at the 2001 Wimbledon Championships, with a win over Mariano Puerta. He also won just one Grand Slam doubles match, which was against South Africans Jeff Coetzee and Marcos Ondruska in the 2001 Australian Open, partnering Juan Balcells.

His best singles showing on the ATP Tour came at Prague in 1999 when he reached the semi-finals and he was also a quarter-finalist in the Swedish Open that year and again in the 2001 Grand Prix Hassan II.

As a doubles player he teamed up with countryman Eduardo Nicolás to make the semi-final stage of the 1999 Swedish Open. That effort was matched in the 2001 Mexican Open with Albert Portas. The pair also had a win that year over the fifth seeds in the 2001 Hamburg Masters, Wayne Ferreira and Yevgeny Kafelnikov, although it was due to a first set retirement.

== Challenger titles ==
=== Singles: (4) ===
| No. | Year | Tournament | Surface | Opponent | Score |
|---|---|---|---|---|---|
| 1. | 2000 | Barletta, Italy | Clay | (Spain) Tommy Robredo | 6–4, 7–6^{(7–3)} |
| 2. | 2000 | Ulm, Germany | Clay | (Spain) David Sánchez | 6–3, 6–3 |
| 3. | 2000 | Linz, Austria | Clay | (Netherlands) Edwin Kempes | 7–6^{(9–7)}, 6–1 |
| 4. | 2001 | Fürth, Germany | Clay | (Denmark) Kristian Pless | 6–4, 6–3 |

=== Doubles: (10) ===
| No. | Year | Tournament | Surface | Partner | Opponents | Score |
|---|---|---|---|---|---|---|
| 1. | 1996 | Cairo, Egypt | Clay | (Spain) Alberto Berasategui | (Slovakia) Branislav Gálik (Slovenia) Borut Urh | 6–0, 6–0 |
| 2. | 1998 | Montauban, France | Clay | (Spain) Eduardo Nicolás | (Netherlands) Edwin Kempes (Netherlands) Rogier Wassen | 7–6, 7–6 |
| 3. | 1998 | Budva, Yugoslavia | Clay | (Spain) Eduardo Nicolás | (Portugal) Emanuel Couto (Portugal) João Cunha-Silva | 3–6, 6–1, 6–3 |
| 4. | 1998 | Skopje, Macedonia | Clay | (Spain) Eduardo Nicolás | (Russia) Andrei Merinov (Russia) Andrei Stoliarov | 7–5, 3–6, 7–6 |
| 5. | 1999 | Braunschweig, Germany | Clay | (Spain) Albert Portas | (Spain) Tomás Carbonell (Federal Republic of Yugoslavia) Nebojsa Djordjevic | 6–4, 6–7^{(3–7)}, 6–3 |
| 6. | 1999 | Venice, Italy | Clay | (Spain) Albert Portas | (Argentina) Diego del Río (Argentina) Mariano Hood | 6–4, 6–0 |
| 7. | 1999 | Barcelona, Spain | Clay | (Spain) Eduardo Nicolás | (Spain) Alberto Martín (Spain) Javier Sánchez | 7–6^{(7–1)}, 7–6^{(7–5)} |
| 8. | 2000 | Fürth, Germany | Clay | (Spain) Eduardo Nicolás | (United States) Devin Bowen (United States) Brandon Coupe | 6–4, 6–2 |
| 9. | 2000 | Sevilla, Spain | Clay | (Spain) Eduardo Nicolás | (Spain) Tommy Robredo (Spain) Santiago Ventura | 6–3, 6–2 |
| 10. | 2001 | Barletta, Italy | Clay | (Spain) Jairo Velasco Jr. | (Germany) Tomas Behrend (Russia) Mikhail Youzhny | 6–1, 1–0 RET |
