= Tommy Robredo =

Spanish tennis player (born 1982)

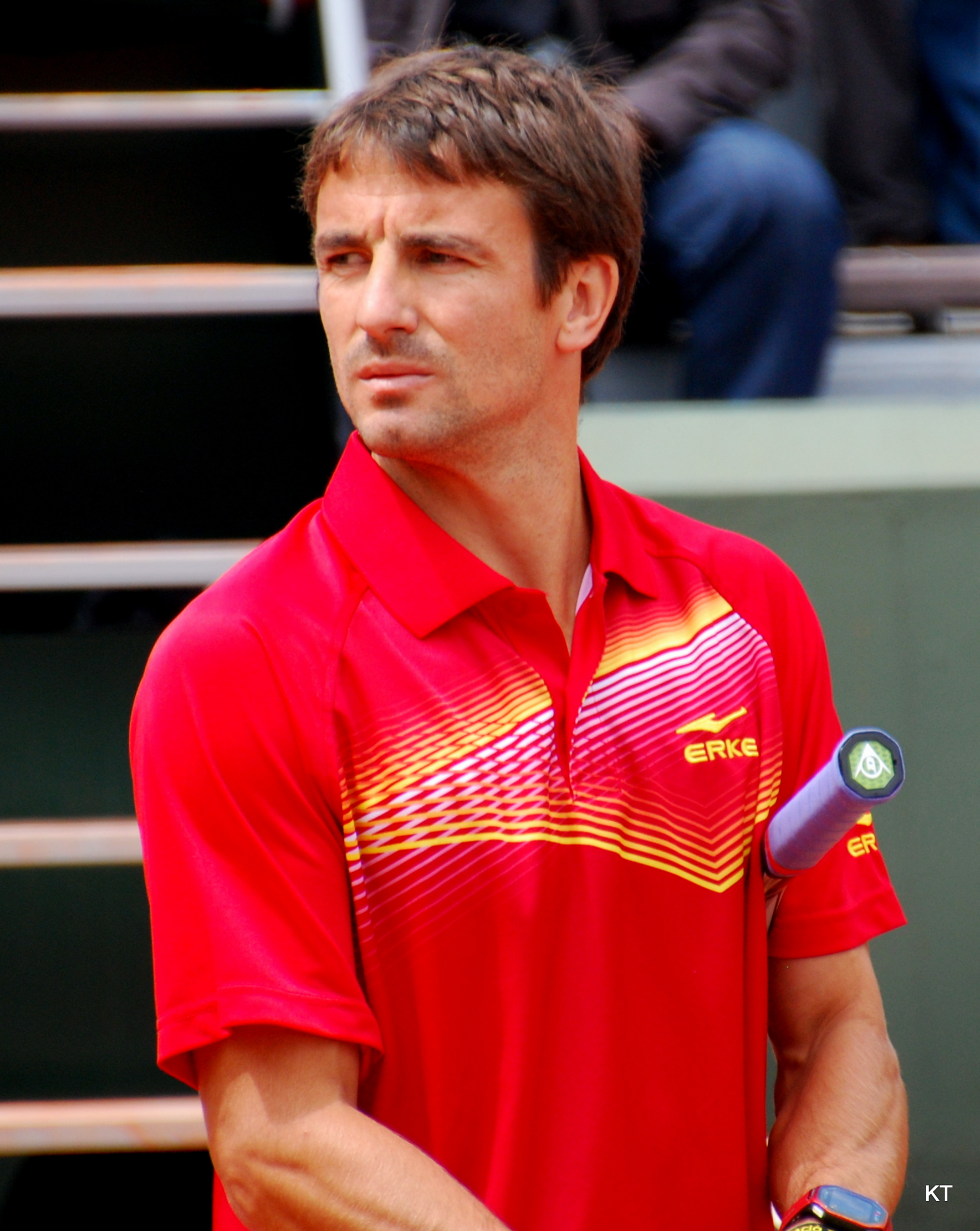
- Robredo at 2013 Roland Garros
- Country (sports): Spain
- Residence: Barcelona, Spain
- Born: 1 May 1982 (age 44) Hostalric, Spain
- Height: 1.80 m (5 ft 11 in)
- Turned pro: 1998
- Retired: 2022
- Plays: Right-handed (one-handed backhand)
- Coach: Jose Luis Aparisi
- Prize money: US$13,456,460

Singles
- Career record: 533–358 (59.8%) (in ATP World Tour and Grand Slam main draw matches, and in Davis Cup)
- Career titles: 12
- Highest ranking: No. 5 (28 August 2006)

Grand Slam singles results
- Australian Open: QF (2007)
- French Open: QF (2003, 2005, 2007, 2009, 2013)
- Wimbledon: 4R (2014)
- US Open: QF (2013)

Other tournaments
- Tour Finals: RR (2006)
- Olympic Games: 3R (2004)

Doubles
- Career record: 158–177
- Career titles: 5
- Highest ranking: No. 16 (20 April 2009)

Grand Slam doubles results
- Australian Open: QF (2003)
- French Open: QF (2009)
- Wimbledon: QF (2010)
- US Open: SF (2004, 2008, 2010)

Mixed doubles
- Career record: 3–2
- Career titles: 0

Grand Slam mixed doubles results
- Australian Open: SF (2009)
- Wimbledon: 1R (2010)

Team competitions
- Davis Cup: W (2004, 2008, 2009)
- Hopman Cup: W (2002, 2010)

Tomás Robredo Garcés (Spanish pronunciation: [ˈtomi roˈβɾeðo ɣaɾˈθes], (Note: In isolation, Garcés is pronounced [gaɾˈθes].) Catalan: [ɡəɾˈses]; born 1 May 1982) is a Spanish former professional tennis player. His career-high singles ranking was world No. 5, which he reached in August 2006 as a result of winning the Hamburg Masters earlier in the year. Robredo reached the quarterfinals at seven singles major tournaments. He was also a three-time semifinalist at the US Open men's doubles tournament, and a semifinalist at the Australian Open in mixed doubles.

Robredo turned professional in 1998 and was coached by José Manuel "Pepo" Clavet and then by Karim Perona. Robredo considered his forehand to be his best shot, and red clay his favorite surface. He remains the only player in Open Era history to mount three consecutive comebacks from two sets down, a feat achieved en route to the quarterfinals of the 2013 French Open. He has one of the highest percentages of five-set matches won with 77.3 per cent (17–5 win–loss record).

== Tennis career ==
=== Early years ===
Robredo began playing tennis regularly when he was five and his family moved to Olot, where his father Ángel became the director of the local tennis club, Club Natació Olot. (Robredo's mother Dolores is herself a former assistant coach.) He was coached by his father until 1996 when he joined the Spanish Tennis Federation at the Centre d'Alt Rendiment ("High Performance Center"), a famous center for professional sports training in Sant Cugat del Vallès. He turned professional in 1998.

As a junior player, Robredo won the Junior Orange Bowl 16-Under in both singles and doubles (with Marc López) in 1998. As a professional he made the singles and doubles finals of a Futures-level event, winning the doubles title with Pedro Cánovas. In 1999, he made the semifinals of the boys' event at the French Open and won a Futures tournament in singles as well as another in doubles. Earlier that year in Robredo's hometown tournament of Barcelona – his first event at the ATP Tour level – he recorded a win over Marat Safin, who was then ranked in the world's top thirty, before going on to lose to top ten player Todd Martin.

=== 2000–2001: First ATP title ===
In 2000, Robredo reached the singles and doubles finals of the boys' event at Roland Garros, losing to Paul-Henri Mathieu in the singles but winning the doubles with López. He also won the boys' doubles title at the Australian Open (with Nicolas Mahut). Robredo began the year with a final at a Challenger event in Barletta, Italy losing to Germán Puentes. He then eventually won two Challenger events in Espinho, Portugal defeating Jimy Szymanski and in Seville, Spain defeating Óscar Serrano. He played two ATP main draw events in the year, losing in the first round of both at the Torneo Godó and Davidoff Swiss Indoors.

Robredo began his 2001 season by reaching his first ATP semifinals at the Gold Flake Open losing to Russian Andrei Stoliarov 6–4, 3–6, 4–6. He made his slam debut at the Australian Open but lost to eventual runner-up and 18th ranked Arnaud Clément in straight sets. He then fell early at the Chevrolet Cup and the Copa AT&T.

He then reached his first ATP final at the Grand Prix Hassan II losing to Guillermo Cañas 5–7, 2–6 in the final, the result pushed him inside the top 100 for the first time. He backed it up with a third round appearance at the Open SEAT Godó after defeating his first top 20 player in then world no. 13 Sébastien Grosjean before losing to Michel Kratochvil. He played in Spain again at the Majorca Open reaching the second round.

He then won his first slam match at the French Open defeating Raemon Sluiter 7–5, 7–5, 7–6^{(11–9)} and surprisingly reached the fourth round losing the former French Open champion Yevgeny Kafelnikov 3–6, 4–6, 6–1, 4–6. He then backed it up with a semifinal showing at the Heineken Trophy losing to Guillermo Cañas. At the slam of Wimbledon, he reached the second round but lost to Sargis Sargsian. He then went back to clay, reaching the quarterfinals of the Telenordia Swedish Open and third round of the Mercedes Cup.

At the Idea Prokom Open, he was able to win his first title of the year defeating compatriot Albert Portas 1–6, 7–5, 7–6^{(7–2)}. He then fell early at the RCA Championships and Legg Mason Tennis Classic. At the US Open, he earn his first top ten win defeating world number five Juan Carlos Ferrero in a tight five setter 7–6^{(7–5)}, 4–6, 6–4, 4–6, 7–6^{(7–1)} before losing in the 4th Round to Andy Roddick in straight sets. He followed it up with a semifinal at the Campionati Internazionali di Sicilia. He ended the year with a four match losing streak, in the second round of the CA-TennisTrophy, and the first rounds of Stuttgart Masters, Davidoff Swiss Indoors, and Paris Masters. He was the second youngest player to end the season inside the world's top thirty, behind Roddick.

=== 2002–2003: first Grand Slam quarterfinal ===
Robredo began 2002 by partnering with Arantxa Sánchez Vicario to win the Hopman Cup for Spain. In the Final against the United States, Sánchez Vicario lost 1–6, 6–7 to Monica Seles before Robredo levelled the tie with a 6–3, 2–6, 7–6 victory over Jan-Michael Gambill. The Spanish pair then won the mixed doubles, 6–4, 6–2. However, in the first four months of the season, he was only able to win 4 matches to 10 loses, and was unable to win back-to-back matches. He reached the second rounds of Australian Open, Open 13, ABN AMRO World Tennis Tournament, and NASDAQ-100 Open. He claimed his first back-to-back win at the Internazionali BNL d'Italia, where he reached the quarterfinals losing to Andy Roddick in two tight sets, this was his first Masters quarterfinals. He followed it up with a solid performance at the Hamburg Masters, where he upset then world no. 2 Tommy Haas in the third round en route to his Masters semifinal debut, where he retired against Marat Safin down 4–6, 2–4 with a right ankle injury. At the French Open, he fell in the third round to Andre Agassi. For the second year in a row, he reached the semifinals of the Ordina Open losing to Sjeng Schalken. However, he fell in the first round of Wimbledon to Raemon Sluiter. He then reached the semifinals of Swedish Open and the quarterfinals of the Mercedes Cup. At his US Open preparation, He made it to the second round of the Canada Masters and third round of the Western & Southern Financial Group Masters. At the US Open, he reached the third rounds losing to Wayne Ferreira in straight sets. Robredo suffered first round loses at the Brasil Open and Kremlin Cup, and second round loses at CA-TennisTrophy and Mutua Madrileña Masters Madrid. He reached his fourth semifinal of the If Stockholm Open losing to Paradorn Srichaphan. He ended the year with a second round loss at the BNP Paribas Masters losing to Thomas Johansson in straight sets. He ended the year at number 30 for the second year in a row and broke pass the million-dollar mark in career earnings.

In 2003, Robredo began with four first round loses, including in the Australian Open. He won his first matches at the Dubai Tennis Championships, where he upset world no. 7 Marat Safin in the second round 7–3 in the third set tie-break. He lost in the quarterfinals to Jiří Novák. He then lost in the third round of the Pacific Life Open and first match at the NASDAQ-100 Open. He reached another semifinal at the Estoril Open losing to Agustín Calleri in straight sets. In the rest of the European clay season, he reached the third rounds of Monte Carlo Masters and Telecom Italia Masters. He once again lost to Agustín Calleri at the quarterfinals of the Open Seat Godo. He was upset by Mariano Zabaleta in the second round of the Hamburg Masters.

He got his best result of the year at the French Open, where he reached his first slam quarterfinals, where he took out world no. 1 Lleyton Hewitt in five sets 4–6, 1–6, 6–3, 6–2, 6–3 in the third round and three-time French Open champion Gustavo Kuerten in the fourth round, before eventually falling in a second five-set match to defending champion Albert Costa 6–2, 6–3, 4–6, 5–7, 2–6. Robredo remarked before his match against Costa: "I've beaten the ace, I've beaten the king", in reference to his wins over Hewitt and Kuerten. "Now I need to beat the jack, don't I? If I beat Costa, I'll have beaten the entire pack of cards."

After a quarterfinal at the Ordina Open losing to Sjeng Schalken and third round at Wimbledon losing to Andy Roddick, Robredo broke into the top 20. At the Swedish Open, he reached his third semifinal losing to Nicolás Lapentti. He reached his lone final of the year at the Mercedes Cup but lost to Guillermo Coria in straight sets 6–2, 6–2, 6–1. At the North American Swing, Robredo didn't have good results, only a third round at the Canada Masters, a second round at the TD Waterhouse Cup, and the first rounds of the Western & Southern Financial Group Masters and US Open. He was able to reach the quarterfinals of the Open de Moselle, but fell in his first matches at the CA-TennisTrophy and Mutua Madrileña Masters Madrid. He then lost in the round of 16 in his final two events at the Davidoff Swiss Indoors and BNP Paribas Masters. Robredo ended the year just outside the top 20 at 21.

=== 2004: First Davis Cup title ===
Robredo had a great start to his 2004 season with a semifinal at the Chennai Open losing to Paradorn Srichaphan 6–1, 6–7^{(10–12)}, 5–7 and a quarterfinal at the Adidas International losing to Carlos Moyà 1–6, 2–6. He also claimed his first doubles title at the Chennai Open with Rafael Nadal defeating Jonathan Erlich and Andy Ram in the final. However, this results didn't reflect to his Australian Open, where he fell to 34th ranked Gastón Gaudio, who just missed the seedings in straight sets. Representing Spain in the Davis Cup, he won his first ever Davis Cup match over Czech Republic's Radek Štěpánek in four sets 7–5, 3–6, 7–6^{(7–4)}, 7–6^{(9–7)}. Despite reaching the quarterfinals of the Milan Indoor, he fell early in his next three events, first rounds of ABN AMRO World Tennis Tournament and Indian Wells Masters, and the second round of the Dubai Tennis Championships. At the Miami Masters, he was able to reach the fourth round, once again losing to Carlos Moyà. During the European clay season, he was only able to reach the quarterfinals of the Estoril Open and fell in the first round of Monte Carlo Masters. However, he made his breakthrough at the Torneo Godó, where he won his second ATP title, defeating Gastón Gaudio in a five-set 4-hour marathon 6–3, 4–6, 6–2, 3–6, 6–3. At the next two Masters events, the Telecom Italia Masters and Hamburg Masters, he lost in the second and third rounds, respectively. Despite his mixed results, he was able to reach the fourth round of the French Open after defeating world no. 11 Nicolás Massú dropping only four games in three sets. He fell to Carlos Moyà in straight sets.

In the grass season, he was able to reach the semifinals of the Ordina Open, but once again fell early in Wimbledon, losing in the second round. He then fell in the second round of his next three events, Swedish Open, Mercedes Cup, and Canada Masters. Robredo bounced back by reaching his first Masters hardcourt semifinal at the Western & Southern Financial Group Masters, where he upset world no. 7 Juan Carlos Ferrero 7–6^{(7–5)}, 4–6, 6–4 in the second round, before losing to Lleyton Hewitt in straight sets. Competing for Spain at the Olympics, he fell in the third round to Tomáš Berdych. At the final slam of the year, the US Open, he was able to reach the fourth round losing to world no. 2 Andy Roddick in straight sets. He then competed for Spain against France in the semifinal of Davis Cup and defeated Paul-Henri Mathieu in a dead rubber. He followed it up with a quarterfinal showing at the Madrid Masters losing to Andre Agassi. He then withdrew prior to his second round match against eventual champion Jiří Novák at the Davidoff Swiss Indoors. He then was upset by Jürgen Melzer in his first match at the Paris Masters. Robredo ended the year with a loss at the Davis Cup final, however the loss didn't affect the result as Spain already won the tie and his match was a dead rubber. Robredo ended the year inside the top 20 for the first time at 13.

=== 2005: Second French Open quarterfinal ===
He began the year with a first round loss at the Heineken Open. At the first slam of the year, the Australian Open, he was upset by 155th ranked Marcos Baghdatis in straight sets in the third round 6–7^{(2–7)}, 4–6, 1–6. He reached his first semifinal at the Dubai Tennis Championships losing to Croatian Ivan Ljubičić in straight sets. At the Master events of Pacific Life Open and NASDAQ-100 Open, he reached the fourth round losing to Tim Henman and withdrew with a neck injury in the third round, respectively. The injury made him miss some events.

He began his European clay season at the Torneo Godó losing to Alberto Martin in straight sets. He reached his first final of the year at the Estoril Open but lost to Argentinian Gastón Gaudio 1–6, 6–2, 1–6. But fell miserably to Julien Benneteau at the Internazionali BNL d'Italia, winning only a game. At the Hamburg Masters, he was able to reach the third round losing to world no. 1 Roger Federer. He made his final French Open preparation at the World Team Cup, defeating Vincent Spadea and Tommy Haas, but lost to Thomas Johansson. At the French Open, he was able to make his second quarterfinal after defeating then world no. 4 Marat Safin 7–5, 1–6, 6–1, 4–6, 8–6, but lost to Russian Nikolay Davydenko 6–3, 1–6, 2–6, 6–4, 4–6. At the grass season he fell early at the second round of the Ordina Open and first round of Wimbledon.

Robredo then played on clay after Wimbledon. He began with a semifinal showing at the Swedish Open losing to world no. 3 Rafael Nadal. He was then upset by Italians Andreas Seppi and Filippo Volandri at the third round of the Mercedes Cup and the quarterfinals of the Croatia Open Umag, respectively, both loses in three sets. At the US Open Series, the Spaniard he did fairly. He reached the third round of the Rogers Cup losing to Gastón Gaudio. He then upset Gastón Gaudio in the first round of the Western & Southern Financial Group Masters but lost to José Acasuso in the following round. At his final stop before the US Open, he was able to reach the quarterfinals of the New Haven Open at Yale losing to Victor Hănescu. At the US Open, he once again reached the fourth round, losing to American James Blake. He played on the clay courts of Campionati Internazionali di Sicilia, but once again lost to Filippo Volandri in the quarterfinals. He began the indoor season at the semifinal of the BA-CA-TennisTrophy, losing to Ivan Ljubičić. He then followed it up with a final 16 showing at the Mutua Madrileña Masters Madrid and at the Grand Prix de Tennis de Lyon, which pushed him out of the top 20. He ended the year with a quarterfinal at the BNP Paribas Masters, losing to Ivan Ljubičić. Robredo ended the year as the world no. 19.

=== 2006: Hamburg Masters title, Top 5 career-high ranking ===
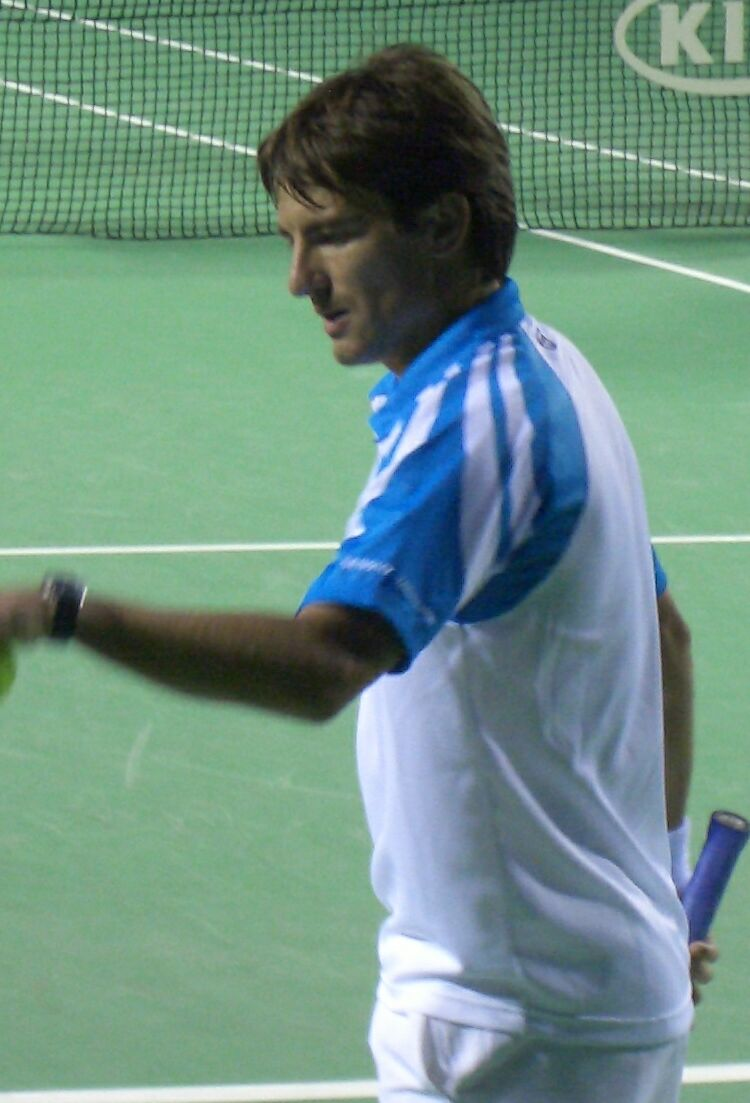
Robredo at the Australian Open

Robredo 2006 season didn't start well, losing in the second round of the Next Generation Adelaide International and the first round of the Medibank International. Despite a poor preparation, he was able to reach the fourth round of the Australian Open for the first time after defeating James Blake 6–3, 6–4, 6–4, but lost to world no. 4 David Nalbandian 3–6, 0–6, 6–2, 2–6. He then followed it up with four consecutive loses, both his matches at the Davis Cup, the SAP Open, and Regions Morgan Keegan Championships. He ended his losing streak by reaching the quarterfinals of the Tennis Channel Open, losing to Ivo Karlović 6–7^{(4–7)}, 4–6. At the first Masters events of the year, losing to James Blake at the third round of the Pacific Life Open and losing to Nicolás Massú at the second round of the NASDAQ-100 Open.

Robredo had a great European clay season, which began with a quarterfinal at the Monte Carlo Masters with a loss to Gastón Gaudio 1–6, 3–6 after defeating then world no. 3 David Nalbandian. He then followed it up with his first final of the year at the Torneo Godó facing compatriot Rafael Nadal but lost in straight sets 4–6, 4–6, 0–6. This performance pushed Robredo into his top 10 debut. Despite falling in the first round of the Internazionali BNL d'Italia to Britain's Greg Rusedski 7–5, 3–6, 4–6, he bounced back at the Hamburg Masters. There he reached the final, his first final of a Masters event after defeating Mario Ančić 7–5, 6–4 in the semifinal, he was able to capture the title defeating Radek Štěpánek 6–1, 6–3, 6–3 in the final. He went back into the top ten at number 7 with his first Masters title. At the French Open, he was upset by Mario Ančić in 5 tight sets 4–6, 6–4, 6–2, 4–6, 5–7 in the fourth round. At the grass season, he lost in the second rounds of the Ordina Open and Wimbledon Championships. He then upset world no. 5 Nikolay Davydenko in straight sets of the Swedish Open final for his second title of the year. However, he fell early at the Austrian Open Kitzbühel and Orange Warsaw Open losing in the second round.

At his US Open preparation, he was upset in the second round Rogers Cup by José Acasuso. He then reached the semifinals of the Western & Southern Financial Group Masters after upsetting then world no. 3 Ivan Ljubičić 7–6^{(8–6)}, 6–2, but lost to a resurgent former world no. 1 Juan Carlos Ferrero 3–6, 4–6. Despite the loss he entered the top 5. At the US Open, he reached the fourth round for the third consecutive year, this time losing to Mikhail Youzhny 2–6, 0–6, 1–6.

As the top seed at the Kingfisher Airlines Tennis Open, he was upset by Dmitry Tursunov in the semifinals 6–7^{(2–7)}, 6–3, 1–6. At the Japan Open Tennis Championships, he fell to surprise quarterfinalist Hyung-taik Lee. At the Mutua Madrileña Madrid Masters, he reached the third round losing to Robby Ginepri. He was able to reach the semifinals of the final Masters event of the year at the BNP Paribas Masters losing to Nikolay Davydenko 3–6, 7–5, 2–6. Robredo qualified for the Tennis Masters Cup and fell in the round robin stage with losses to Rafael Nadal and Nikolay Davydenko, but earned a win over eventual runner-up James Blake in three sets. He ended the year inside the top 10 for the first time at number 7.

=== 2007: Maiden Australian Open and third French Open quarterfinals ===
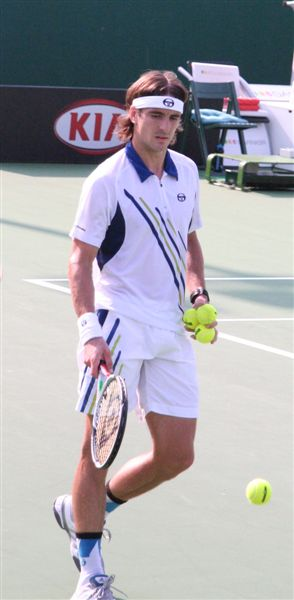
Robredo reaches the quarterfinal of the Australian Open.

Robredo began 2007 by reaching the final of the Heineken Open losing to compatriot David Ferrer 4–6, 2–6, in his first hardcourt final. He then followed it up by reaching the quarterfinals of a Grand Slam at the Australian Open for the first time in his career after defeating Richard Gasquet 6–4, 6–2, 3–6, 6–4, before losing to World No. 1 Roger Federer in straight sets.

He then suffered 3 back-to-back loses starting with the quarterfinals of the ABN AMRO World Tennis Tournament to Novak Djokovic in three sets, it is then followed by loses at the Dubai Tennis Championships and Pacific Life Open. At the Sony Ericsson Open, he was able to reach the quarterfinals losing to eventual runner-up Guillermo Cañas 6–7^{(5–7)}, 1–6.

At the European clay season, he reached back-to-back 3rd round rounds of the Monte Carlo Masters and Torneo Godó, with both loses being in three sets. He reached his second semifinals at the Estoril Open losing to Novak Djokovic. At the Masters event of Internazionali BNL d'Italia, he was able to reach the quarterfinals losing to Nikolay Davydenko in three sets. At the Hamburg Masters, as the defending champion he fell in the second round after receiving a bye to Nicolás Almagro 7–6^{(7–1)}, 2–6, 4–6. At the French Open, he reached his third quarterfinal at the event losing to Roger Federer 5–7, 6–1, 1–6, 2–6, this is the first time Robredo reached back-to-back slam quarterfinals and became the first man since Andy Roddick in the 2006 US Open to win a set from Federer in a Grand Slam tournament, snapping Federer's record winning streak of thirty-six consecutive sets in Grand Slam matches.

At the grass courts, as the top seed he was upset by qualifier Peter Wessels at the quarterfinals of the Ordina Open. At Wimbledon, he fell in the second round to Wayne Arthurs in straight sets. He then fell in the first rounds of the Swedish Open and Mercedes Cup. He then reached the quarterfinals if the Austrian Open losing to eventual champion Juan Mónaco 2–6, 6–2, 2–6. He claimed his first title of the year at the Orange Prokom Open defeating José Acasuso 7–5, 6–0 in the final. He then lost in his first matches at the Rogers Cup and the Western & Southern Financial Group Masters. He then fell in the back-to-back third rounds at the Pilot Pen Tennis and US Open. He then reached his first indoor final at the China Open where he lost to second seed Fernando González 1–6, 6–3, 1–6. In his next event at the Open de Moselle, he won his first hardcourt and indoor title of his career defeating Andy Murray 0–6, 6–2, 6–3. He then lost in his first matches at the Mutua Madrileña Masters Madrid and Grand Prix de Tennis de Lyon. In his final tournament the year at the BNP Paribas Masters losing to Marcos Baghdatis 4–6, 4–6 in the quarterfinals. He then served as an alternate at the Tennis Masters Cup. He ended the year ranked World No. 10.

=== 2008: Second Davis Cup title ===
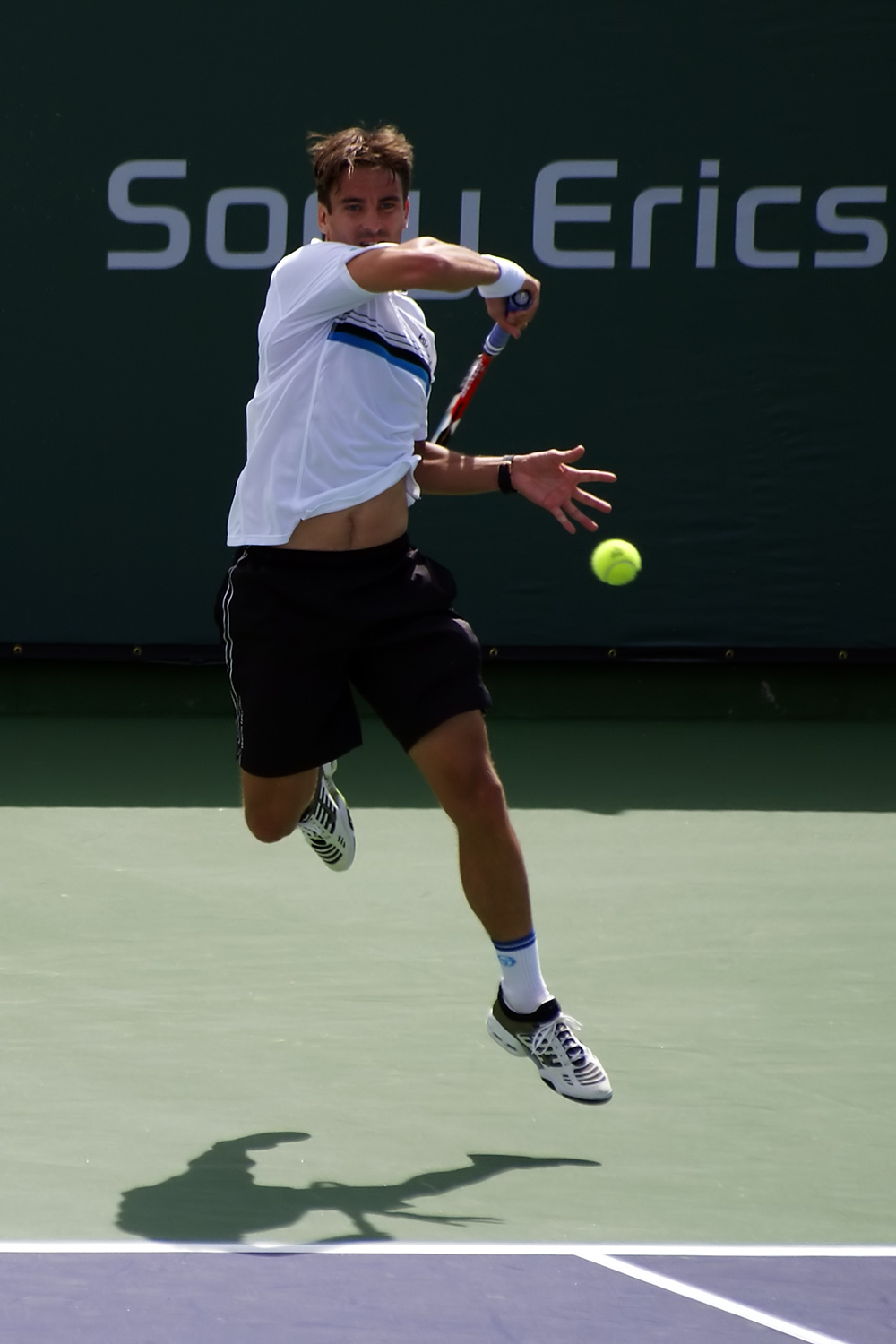
Robredo at the 2008 Indian Wells Masters

Robredo started the season with back-to-back loses at the first rounds of the Qatar Open losing to Agustín Calleri and the Medibank International losing to Radek Štěpánek. He won his first match of the year at the Australian Open defeating Mischa Zverev in five sets before losing to Mardy Fish 1–6, 2–6, 3–6. He then represented Spain in the Davis Cup against Peru and won both his matches. He then won only one other match in hardcourts, losing in the first matches at the ABN AMRO World Tennis Tournament and Sony Ericsson Open, and the third round of the Pacific Life Open. He won his first back-to-back matches reaching the semifinals of the year at the Open de Tenis Comunidad Valenciana losing to eventual champion David Ferrer 6–2, 2–6, 3–6. At the Monte-Carlo Masters, he reached the third round losing to David Nalbandian winning only a game. He also played doubles with compatriot Rafael Nadal to win his first doubles titles in four years by beating Mahesh Bhupathi and Mark Knowles. He followed it up with back-to-back quarterfinals at the Open Sabadell Atlántico Barcelona losing to David Ferrer 6–7^{(4–7)}, 4–6 and the Internazionali BNL d'Italia losing to Andy Roddick 3–6, 6–4, 6–7^{(4–7)}, after upsetting world no. 4 Nikolay Davydenko 4–6, 6–2, 7–6^{(7–4)}. At his final preparation for the Roland Garros, he was upset by Ivo Karlović in the second round of the Hamburg Masters. However, he reached the doubles semifinal pairing with Leander Paes. At the French Open, he was upset by Radek Štěpánek convincingly in the third round 3–6, 2–6, 1–6. He then bounced back by reaching his first final of the year at the Warsaw Open losing to Russian Nikolay Davydenko 3–6, 3–6.

At Wimbledon, he lost to Tommy Haas 4–6, 4–6, 3–6 in the second round. However, he won his first title of the year at the Swedish Open, upsetting world no. 4 David Ferrer 2–6, 6–1, 6–2 in the semifinals and Tomáš Berdych 6–4, 6–1 in the final. In the Masters Series of Rogers Cup and Western & Southern Financial Group Masters, he lost in the second round in both events, being defeated by Marin Čilić and Robin Söderling, respectively. Playing for Spain at the Olympics, he lost to Andreas Seppi 4–6, 6–4, 6–8. At the US Open, he was able to reach the fourth round for the fifth time after defeating Jo-Wilfried Tsonga, but lost to Novak Djokovic in five sets 6–4, 2–6, 3–6, 7–5, 3–6. At the Asian swing, he was able to reach the quarterfinals, falling to Dudi Sela at the China Open and the third round AIG Japan Open Tennis Championships losing to eventual champion Tomáš Berdych. He ended the year with second round loses at the Mutua Madrileña Madrid Open, Grand Prix de Tennis de Lyon, and BNP Paribas Masters. He ended as world no. 21.

=== 2009: Third Davis Cup title ===
Robredo started the year at the Medibank International Sydney, where he lost to Mario Ančić, 6–2, 6–1 in the second round. In the Australian Open, he was the 21st seed, where he reached the fourth round without dropping a set, but eventually lost to semifinalist Andy Roddick 5–7, 1–6, 3–6. Robredo had a great South American clay season, he began with a semifinal at the Movistar Open losing to José Acasuso 7–5, 2–6, 4–6. He then claim back-to-back titles at the Brasil Open and the Copa Telmex, defeating Thomaz Bellucci, 6–3, 3–6, 6–4 and Juan Mónaco, 7–5, 2–6, 7–6^{(7–5)}, respectively. He also won the doubles with Marcel Granollers at the Brasil Open defeating Lucas Arnold Ker and Juan Mónaco in the final 6–4, 7–5. His streak ended at the Abierto Mexicano Telcel losing to José Acasuso 5–7, 2–6 in the quarterfinals.

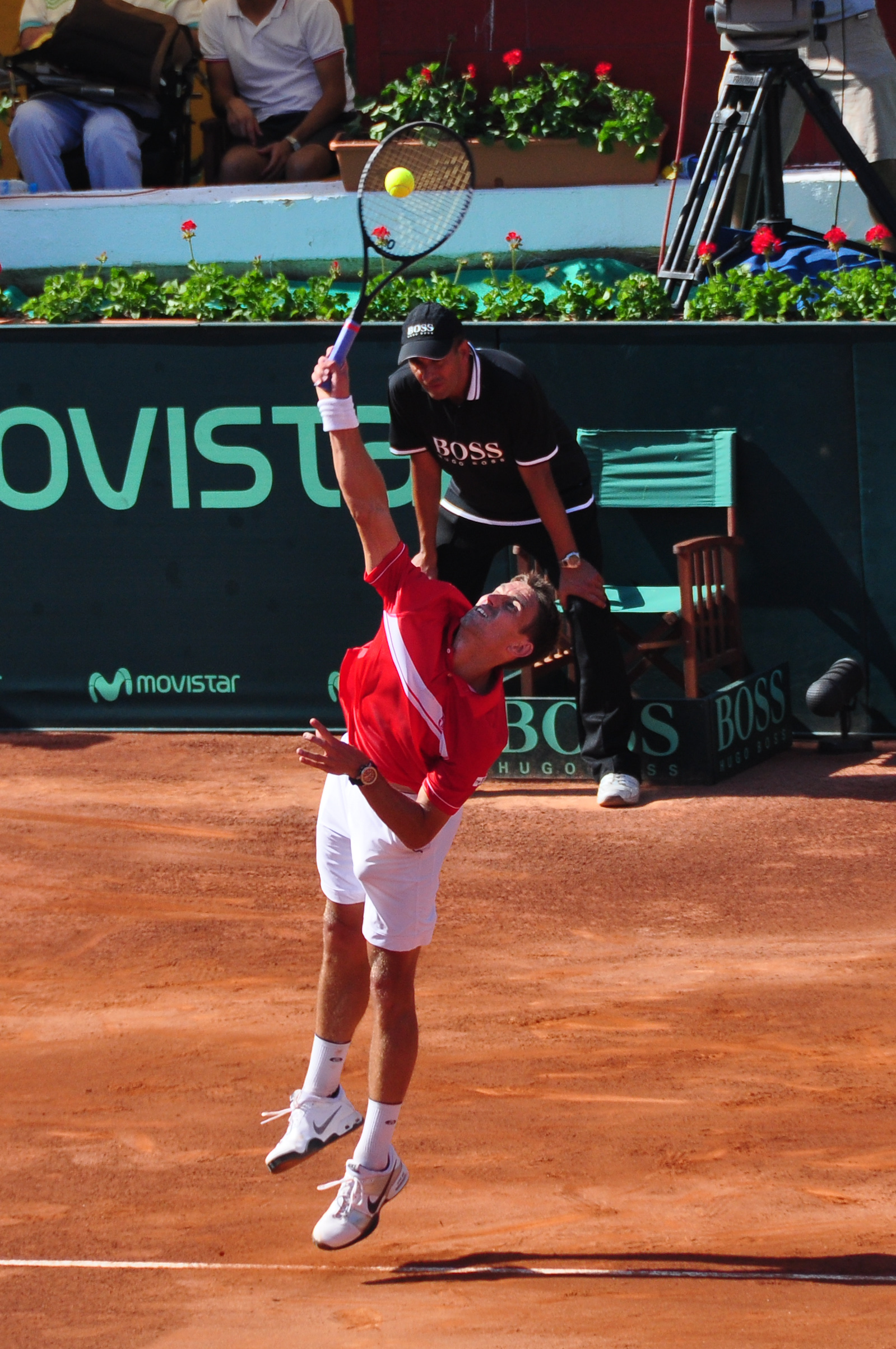
Robredo at the 2009 Davis Cup match against Germany

At the BNP Paribas Open, he lost to Andy Murray in the fourth round, 2–6, 0–3 RET, and in the 2009 Sony Ericsson Open he was upset by Taylor Dent, 5–7, 3–6 in the second round. On European clay, first in the Monte-Carlo Rolex Masters, he was defeated by his Buenos Aires finals opponent Juan Mónaco, 2–6, 4–6, in the second round. He then fell to compatriot David Ferrer in the quarterfinals of the Barcelona Open Banco Sabadell. At the Masters Internazionali BNL d'Italia and Mutua Madrileña Madrid Open, he fell in the third round to Novak Djokovic and Andy Murray, respectively. At Roland Garros, he defeated Adrian Mannarino and compatriot Daniel Gimeno-Traver in straight sets and Máximo González, 4–6, 7–5, 6–1, 6–0, in the third round. He defeated Philipp Kohlschreiber, before losing in straight sets to Juan Martín del Potro in the quarterfinals 3–6, 4–6, 2–6.

Seeded second, he lost to Marcos Baghdatis in the first round at the Ordina Open. Robredo reached the third round of Wimbledon, at which he was seeded 15th, by coming back from two sets down to beat Austrian Stefan Koubek. He next was defeated by Israeli Dudi Sela 6–7^{(8–10)}, 5–7, 6–2, 5–7, however, when they played for a spot in the round of 16. At the Swedish Open, he was the defending champion and the top seed. He reached the semifinals, having lost only nine games. However, he lost to Juan Mónaco 0–6, 2–6. He then lost in the second round of the International German Open and Legg Mason Tennis Classic after receiving a bye, he lost to Iván Navarro and Juan Carlos Ferrero, respectively. He also reached the second round of the Rogers Cup, losing to Philipp Petzschner and lost in the first round of the Western & Southern Financial Group Masters to Jérémy Chardy. He then lost to José Acasuso in the Pilot Pen Tennis, after receiving a bye into the second round. Despite bad showings at the tournaments leading up the US Open, Robredo managed to find some form and was rewarded with yet another fourth-round appearance of the US Open after wins over Donald Young, Guillermo García-López, and James Blake. However, he was again denied a quarterfinal, this time by Roger Federer in straight sets 5–7, 2–6, 2–6. In his first tournament after the US Open at the China Open, he reached the second round, losing to Robin Söderling. He then competed in the Shanghai ATP Masters 1000, where he reached the third round before losing to Rafael Nadal. He then played at the 2009 Valencia Open 500, losing to Fernando Verdasco in the quarterfinals. In his final tournamanent of the year at the BNP Paribas Masters, he lost to Rafael Nadal 3–6, 6–3, 5–7 in the third round, despite serving for the match at 5–4 in the third set.

=== 2010: Late season success: third consecutive US Open fourth round ===
Robredo began the year by winning the Hopman Cup for Spain with partner María José Martínez Sánchez. Here, he won all of his singles matches defeating John Isner, 6–7^{(5–7)}, 6–3, 7–6^{(7–4)}, Victor Hănescu, 6–3 ret, and over Lleyton Hewitt, 6–2, 6–4. He then defeated Andy Murray, 1–6, 6–4, 6–3 in the final and won the decisive mixed doubles 7–6^{(7–5)}, 7–5 win to clinch the tie 2–1 over the Great Britain team. This was the second time he has been part of a winning Hopman Cup team.

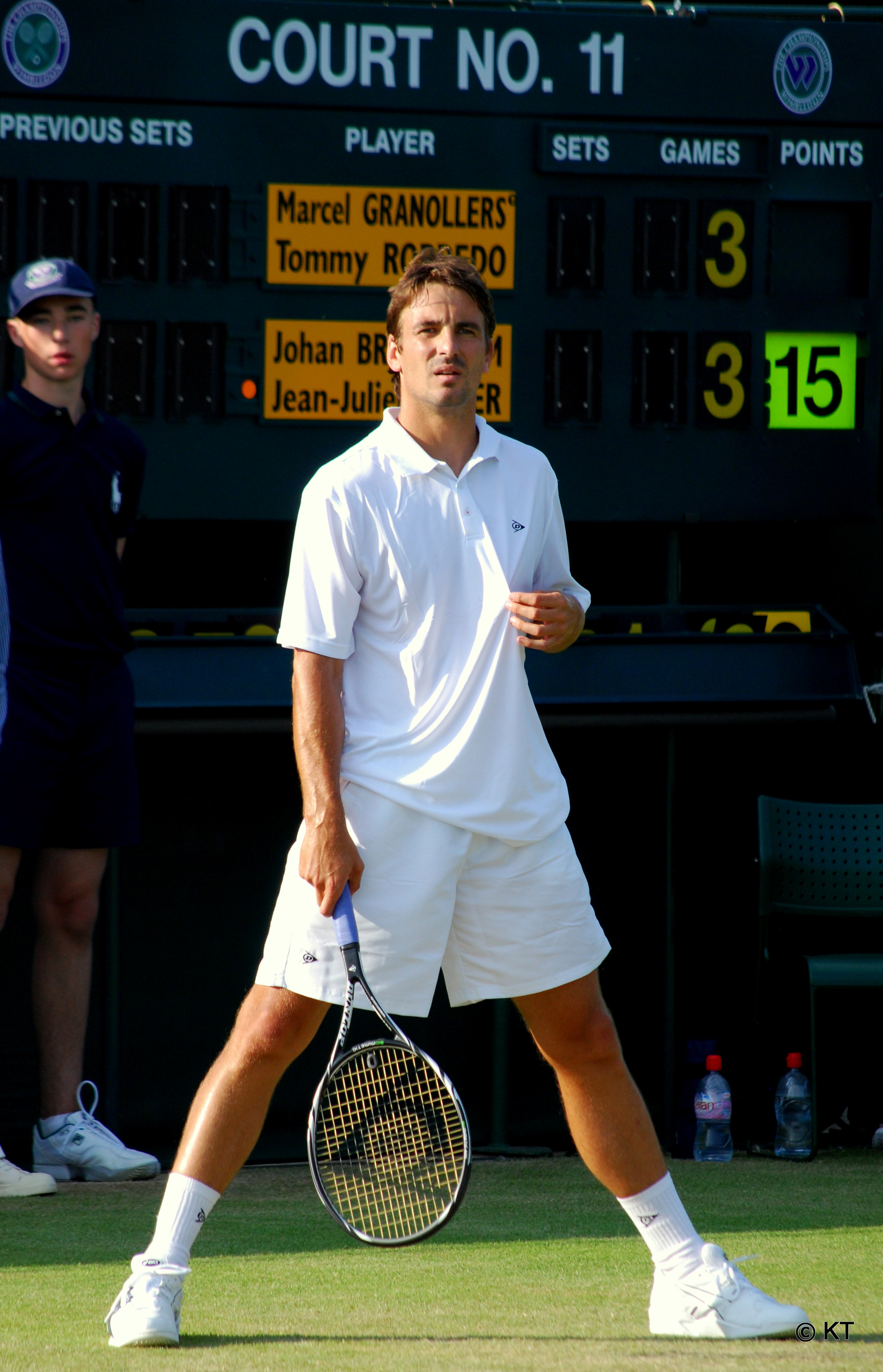
Tommy Robredo at Wimbledon

His first ATP event of 2010 was at the Heineken Open, where he was the top seed, but was upset by John Isner, 6–7^{(5–7)}, 6–3, 4–6 in the quarterfinals. At the Australian Open as the 16th seed, he was upset by a no. 114 player in Santiago Giraldo in straight sets, 4–6, 2–6, 2–6 in the first round. He then played in ABN AMRO World Tennis Tournament, where he was upset by Florian Mayer, 4–6, 6–3, 3–6, in the second round. He also suffered early exits in the second rounds of Open 13 and Dubai Tennis Championships, which cause him to slip out of the top 20.

He then had a resurgence at the BNP Paribas Open. After receiving a bye, he defeated Sergiy Stakhovsky, 2–6, 6–3, 7–5, in the second round, Dudi Sela, 6–3, 6–0, in the third round, and Marcos Baghdatis, 7–5, 0–6, 6–4, in the fourth round, before finally succumbing to Andy Roddick in the quarterfinals, 3–6, 5–7. In the Sony Ericsson Open, he was upset by Benjamin Becker in the third round, losing 6–1, 4–6, 6–7, despite recovering from a break down in 5–6.

He then suffered a 5 match losing streak, starting in the third round of the Monte-Carlo Rolex Masters losing to David Nalbandian 3–6, 4–6, And the first rounds of the Barcelona Open Banco Sabadell losing to Simone Bolelli, 7–6^{(9–7)}, 4–6, 1–3, retiring with a back injury, the French Open, the UNICEF Open, and of Wimbledon, which caused his ranking to go down to world No. 36. Along the way, he missed the Internazionali BNL d'Italia and Mutua Madrileña Madrid Open.

He played in the Swedish Open, where he beat Michał Przysiężny and Andrey Golubev. He then upset second seed Fernando Verdasco, 6–4, 6–3, in the quarterfinals. He lost in the semifinals to Nicolás Almagro 1–6, 3–6,. He then lost his next two matches at the International German Open and Allianz Suisse Open Gstaad to lower-ranked players. He also fell early in his US Open preparations at the second round of the Rogers Cup, first round of the Western & Southern Financial Group Masters and third round of the Pilot Pen Tennis.

However, at the US Open, he was able to get past the first round of a Grand Slam for the first time in the year by reaching the fourth round with wins over Lukáš Rosol, 6–4, 6–3, 6–1, Julien Benneteau, 6–4, 6–6 RET, Michaël Llodra, 3–6, 7–6^{(8–6)}, 6–4, 2–1 RET, but fell to 12th seed Mikhail Youzhny 5–7, 2–6, 6–4, 4–6. He then reached the quarterfinals of the Open de Moselle, losing to Richard Gasquet in two tiebreak sets. He then lost in the first rounds of the China Open and If Stockholm Open, and the second round of the Shanghai Rolex Masters.

=== 2011-2012: ATP title, loss of form and out of the top 100 ===
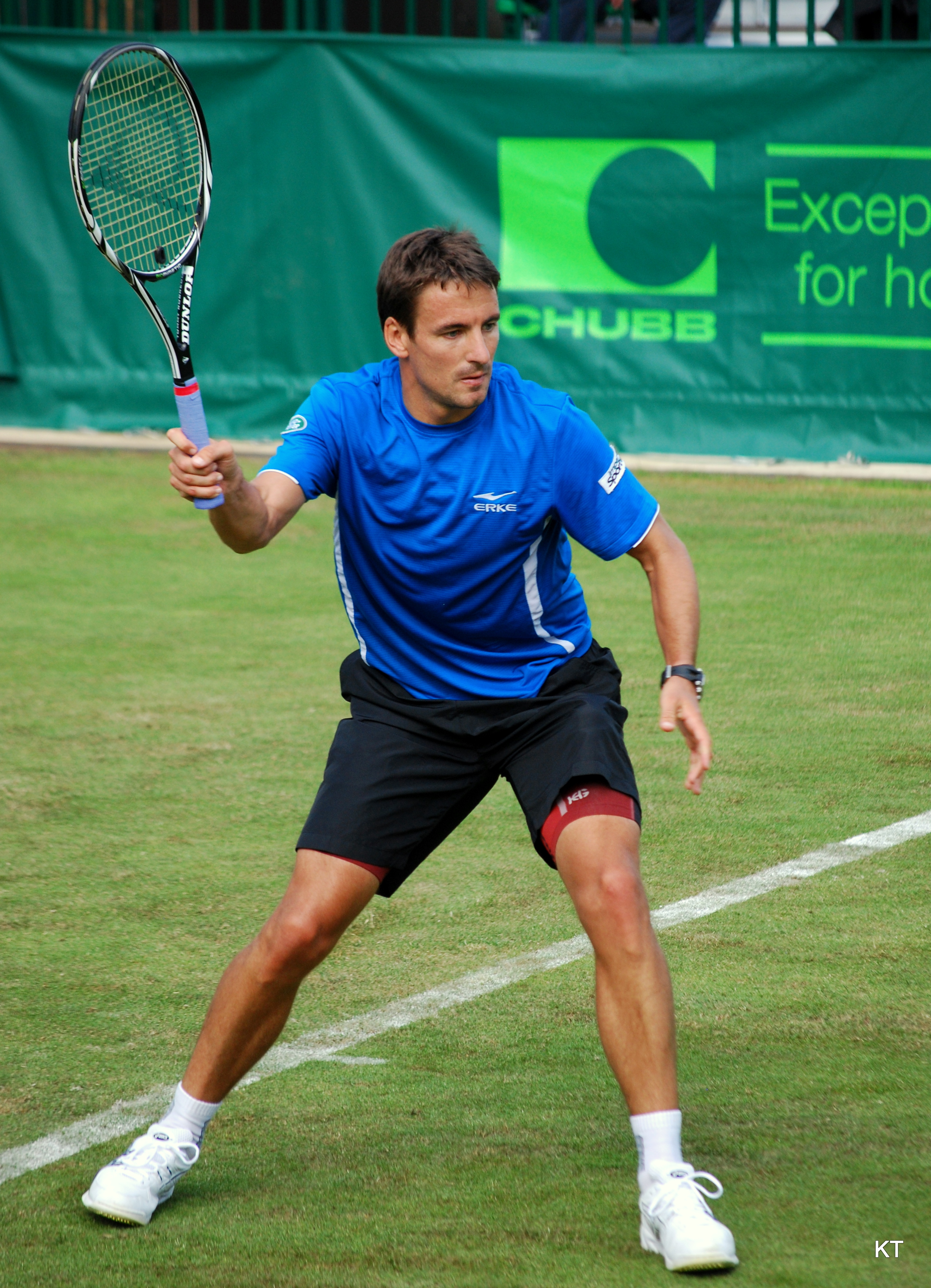
Tommy Robredo at the Boodles Challenge

Tommy started his 2011 season at the Heineken Open, where he lost to Thomaz Bellucci, 4–6, 6–3, 1–6 in the second round. At the 2011 Australian Open, he reached the fourth round with wins against Somdev Devvarman, 16th seed Mardy Fish, and Sergiy Stakhovsky, before losing to second seed and defending champion Roger Federer in four sets, 3–6, 6–3, 3–6, 2–6.

He then played at the Latin-American Swing at the Movistar Open, where he was the sixth seed, he defeated Frederico Gil, Ricardo Mello, Máximo González, and Fabio Fognini to reach his first final in almost two years, where he rallied from 5–2 down in the third set to defeat Santiago Giraldo, 6–2, 2–6, 7–6^{(7–5)}. He then played at the Brasil Open, where was upset by compatriot Pablo Andújar 4–6, 7–5, 2–6 in the second round. He then reach the semifinals at the 2011 Copa Claro, losing to eventual champion Nicolás Almagro, 5–7, 1–6. He earned a win over world No. 20 David Nalbandian, 6–4, 6–4. At the BNP Paribas Open, he was able to reach the quarterfinals, but withdrew from the match due to a strained left abductor muscle, which caused him to miss the Sony Ericsson Open. At the Monte-Carlo Rolex Masters, Robredo upset sixth seed Fernando Verdasco, 6–4, 6–3, and was on course to upset 11th seed Viktor Troicki leading 6–3, 1–2 on serve, but was forced to retire due to a left leg injury. The injury made him miss the European season, including the French Open, which ends his streak of 41 straight slams played. In his return he was only able to win two matches, reaching the second rounds of ATP Studena Croatia Open and Shanghai Rolex Masters. He lost in the first rounds of Wimbledon, Swedish Open, BRD Năstase Țiriac Trophy, China Open, If Stockholm Open, and Erste Bank Open

In 2012, Robredo did not play for the first five months due to a knee injury. He came back at the ATP Challenger Tour and won two titles in Italy at the Città di Caltanissetta defeating Gastão Elias and Aspria Tennis Cup Trofeo City Life defeating Martín Alund, both in straight sets. He came back in the Main Tour at Swedish Open and reached the quarterfinals, losing to David Ferrer in three sets. He then played at the International German Open but lost to Federico Delbonis in the first round. At the US Open Series, he lost in the first round of the Winston-Salem Open to Łukasz Kubot. At the US Open, he upset world No. 27 Andreas Seppi in the first round, before losing to Leonardo Mayer in four sets. He then lost back-to-back finals in the Challenger circuit, at the AON Open Challenger losing to Albert Montañés and at the Copa Sevilla losing to Daniel Gimeno-Traver, both in straight sets. He then reached the second rounds of the Rakuten Japan Open Tennis Championships and Shanghai Rolex Masters, losing to Kei Nishikori and Tommy Haas respectively. He played his final event at the Valencia Open 500, losing in the first round to Fernando Verdasco.

=== 2013: Resurgence: fifth French Open quarterfinal, US Open quarterfinal ===
Robredo's start of the 2013 season was not promising; he only won two matches in his first five events. Losing in the first rounds of Apia International Sydney, Australian Open, and Brasil Open and the second rounds of the Brisbane International and the VTR Open. However, he entered the top 100 once again due to not having to defend any points. He then reached his first semifinal in two years at the Copa Claro, losing to eventual champion David Ferrer. This form did not continue, as he lost in the second round of the Abierto Mexicano Telcel and the first round of the BNP Paribas Open.

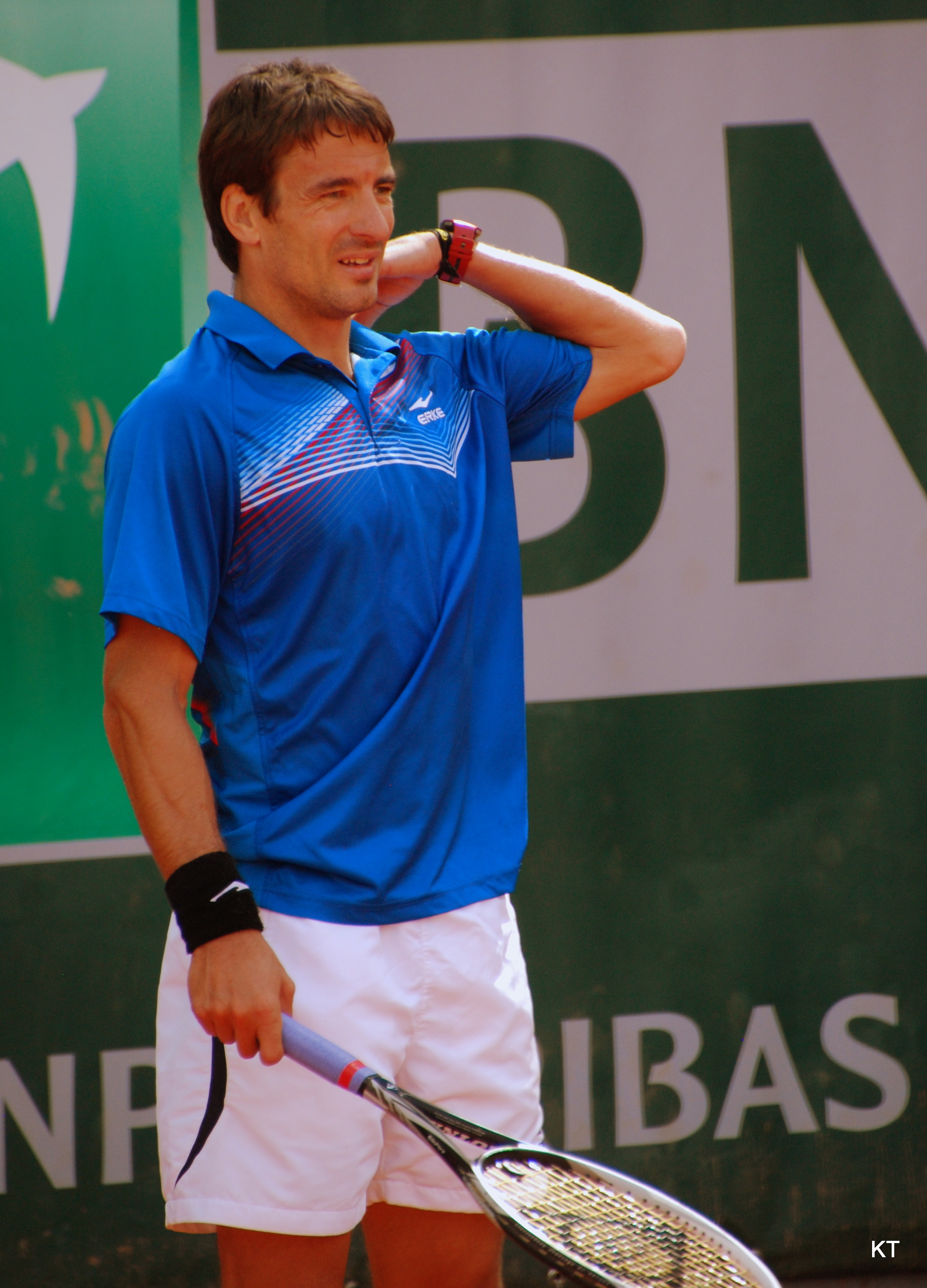
Tommy Robredo at the French Open

Robredo bounced back by winning his first title in two years in Casablanca, beating Kevin Anderson in the final. At the Barcelona Open BancSabadell, he defeated world no. 6 Tomáš Berdych in the third round, his first win over a top-10 player in three years. However, he lost in the quarterfinals to Milos Raonic. He followed it up with another quarterfinal at the Portugal Open, losing to Andreas Seppi. Robredo was able to earn a win at the Mutua Madrid Open, before falling to Tommy Haas.

Robredo then reached his fifth French Open quarterfinal and in doing so made history by becoming the first man since Henri Cochet in 1927 to win three consecutive Grand Slam matches from two sets to love down. After winning his first-round match against Jürgen Zopp in straight sets, Robredo beat Igor Sijsling for his first win from two sets down since beating Lleyton Hewitt at the 2003 French Open. He followed this up by defeating Gaël Monfils in five tightly contested sets, saving four match points in the fourth set at 3–5 and 4–5 down. Robredo then beat Nicolas Almagro, again in five sets, having trailed by a break of serve in each of the last three sets. Robredo lost to David Ferrer in straight sets in the quarterfinals. Robredo as the 32nd seed lost in the third round of Wimbledon to eventual champion Andy Murray in straight sets. Despite this strong showings, he fell in his first matches at the Swedish Open and International German Open. He bounced back again at the ATP Vegeta Croatia Open Umag, winning his second title of the year over Fabio Fognini in the final.

At the US Open Series, he reached the third round of the Western & Southern Open, losing to Tomáš Berdych in straight sets, after earning his second top-10 win of the season over Stanislas Wawrinka in the second round, and the third round of the Winston-Salem Open losing to Gaël Monfils.

At the US Open, he reached the fourth round for the eighth time. There, he overcame a 0–10 head-to-head against Federer to win in three sets and reach his first US Open quarterfinal. This was Federer's first time to lose before the quarterfinals at a hard-court Grand Slam since 2003. He lost in the quarterfinals to eventual champion Rafael Nadal in straight sets. He began the Asian swing by losing in the first round of the China Open to Fabio Fognini. He then retired in the second round of the Shanghai Rolex Masters against Fognini due to a wrist injury; the injury ended his season. Robredo ended the year as the world no. 18. Robredo was named the Spanish Tennis Writers Association player of the year.

=== 2014: Three Grand Slam fourth rounds and three ATP finals, top 20 year-end ranking ===
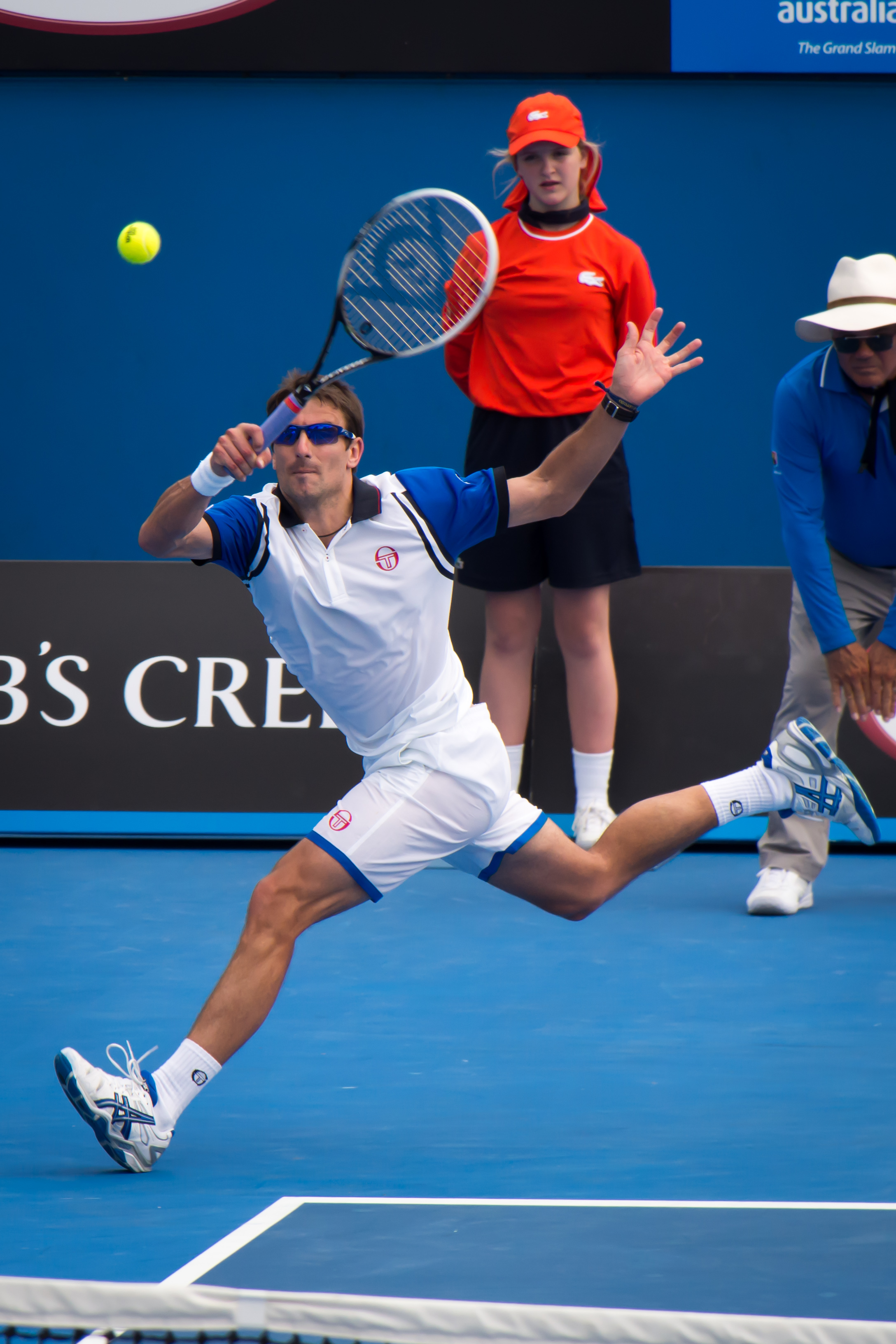
Robredo at the 2014 Australian Open

Seeded 17th, Robredo reached the fourth round of the Australian Open, losing a close match to eventual champion Stanislas Wawrinka. He also reached the fourth rounds at the 2014 Wimbledon seeded 23rd, where he lost to Roger Federer and at the 2014 US Open (tennis) seeded 16th, where he also lost to Wawrinka again.

=== 2021–2022: Retirement ===
Robredo announced his plans to retire after his final tournament at the 2022 Barcelona Open. He played his final career match against countryman Bernabé Zapata Miralles, losing in the first round in straight sets.

== Playing style ==
Robredo is a baseline player, who can play both offensively and defensively. He is known for his versatility and solid groundstrokes on both wings. Robredo's baseline play is exceptional, and is considered one of the most consistent and dangerous baseliners on the tour. Like most traditional Spanish players like Rafael Nadal, Robredo puts a very high amount of topspin on both his forehand and single-handed backhand. This makes his groundstrokes both consistent and penetrating at the same time. His backhand is also considered one of the best single-handed backhands on the tour, being very powerful and clutch during important points. However, his slice is weaker than most one-handers'. Mainly playing from the baseline, Robredo uses his solid groundstrokes to dictate points by moving opponents around and forcing weak replies. Due to the top-spin on his groundstrokes, Robredo has an edge against one-handed backhand players, who might find it hard to return high balls to their backhand. Because of this, he has sometimes been accused of being a "moonballer".

Robredo is also versatile in his baseline play. Due to the penetrating nature of his groundstrokes, he can effectively control points and force weak returns from his opponents, finishing points quickly. However, he can also counter-punch, the height of his balls giving him enough time to recover and preventing opponents from capitalising on weak returns. Robredo usually only flattens out his groundstrokes more when hitting weak returns from opponents, and even then they are not completely flat and still have a substantial amount of topspin.

Robredo's first serve is not considered his weapon due to its lack of any significant pace, but it is not weak to the point that opponents can capitalise on it. He employs a high amount of top-spin for his second serve, making it slow but pushing his opponents further back, preventing his opponents from hitting return aces.

However, Robredo's main weaknesses is his over-defensiveness. At times, even though he has gained a significant advantage through his groundstrokes, Robredo does not make an effort to end off the point cleanly by hitting a clean winner or by coming up to the net to volley. Instead, he usually stays around the baseline, not capitalising on the advantage he has. This makes him especially vulnerable against clutch players who can make use of their opponents' speed or direction to turn the point around, such as Andy Murray and Novak Djokovic.

== Personal life ==
Robredo is named after the rock opera Tommy by The Who, of which his father is a big fan.

Robredo is currently sponsored by Sergio Tacchini for his sportswear, Asics for his shoes, Wilson for his tennis racquets, TW Steel watches, Smeg, and the Ukrainian Food Company.

Robredo's childhood tennis idol was Stefan Edberg, along with John McEnroe, Pete Sampras, Andre Agassi, and various Spanish tennis players. He cites Arantxa Sánchez (with whom he won the 2002 Hopman Cup for Spain) as his favorite female player among retired players; among recently active players his favorite male and female players are Roger Federer and Justine Henin.

Some fans refer to Robredo as "Disco Tommy" for the long, wavy hairstyle he began cultivating during the 2006 tennis season; after Robredo mentioned that he calls his coach "President Palmer" while his coach calls him "Jack Bauer" (from 24), fans also began referring to him as "Disco Jack."

2007 marked increased media exposure for Robredo. He was recognized by the Spanish editions of Men's Health and Marie Claire, as well as People en Español.

On 16 November 2019, Robredo married his long-time girlfriend, Patricia Berga Alzamora. Their first child, a girl, was born in 2021.

== Career statistics ==
=== Grand Slam tournament performance timeline ===
Key
W	F	SF	QF	#R	RR	Q#	P#	DNQ	A	Z#	PO	G	S	B	NMS	NTI	P	NH

(W) winner; (F) finalist; (SF) semifinalist; (QF) quarterfinalist; (#R) rounds 4, 3, 2, 1; (RR) round-robin stage; (Q#) qualification round; (P#) preliminary round; (DNQ) did not qualify; (A) absent; (Z#) Davis/Fed Cup Zonal Group (with number indication) or (PO) play-off; (G) gold, (S) silver or (B) bronze Olympic/Paralympic medal; (NMS) not a Masters tournament; (NTI) not a Tier I tournament; (P) postponed; (NH) not held; (SR) strike rate (events won / competed); (W–L) win–loss record.
To avoid confusion and double counting, these charts are updated at the conclusion of a tournament or when the player's participation has ended.

Tournament	2000	2001	2002	2003	2004	2005	2006	2007	2008	2009	2010	2011	2012	2013	2014	2015	2016	2017	2018	2019	2020	2021	2022	SR	W–L	Win %
Australian Open	Q2	1R	2R	1R	1R	3R	4R	QF	2R	4R	1R	4R	A	1R	4R	1R	2R	A	A	Q1	A	Q1	A	0 / 15	21–15	58%
French Open	Q2	4R	3R	QF	4R	QF	4R	QF	3R	QF	1R	A	A	QF	3R	2R	A	2R	Q1	Q1	Q2	Q1	A	0 / 14	37–14	73%
Wimbledon	A	2R	1R	3R	2R	1R	2R	2R	2R	3R	1R	1R	A	3R	4R	1R	A	A	A	A	NH	Q1	A	0 / 14	14–14	50%
US Open	Q1	4R	3R	1R	4R	4R	4R	3R	4R	4R	4R	A	2R	QF	4R	3R	A	A	1R	Q2	A	A	A	0 / 15	35–15	70%
Win–loss	0–0	7–4	5–4	6–4	7–4	9–4	10–4	11–4	7–4	12–4	3–4	3–2	1–1	10–4	11–4	3–4	1–1	1–1	0–1	0–0	0–0	0–0	0–0	0 / 58	107–58	65%

== Notes ==
Awards
Preceded by (Romania) Horia Tecău	Arthur Ashe Humanitarian of the Year; 2018	Succeeded by (South Africa) Kevin Anderson
