= Robin Söderling career statistics =

Career finals
| Discipline | Type | Won | Lost | Total |
|---|---|---|---|---|
| Singles | Grand Slam | 0 | 2 | 2 |
| Singles | ATP Finals | – | – | – |
| Singles | ATP 1000* | 1 | – | 1 |
| Singles | ATP 500 | 2 | 4 | 6 |
| Singles | ATP 250 | 7 | 4 | 11 |
| Singles | Olympics | – | – | – |
| Singles | Total | 10 | 10 | 20 |
| Doubles | Grand Slam | – | – | – |
| Doubles | ATP Finals | – | – | – |
| Doubles | ATP 1000 | – | – | – |
| Doubles | ATP 500 | – | – | – |
| Doubles | ATP 250 | 1 | 1 | 2 |
| Doubles | Olympics | – | – | – |
| Doubles | Total | 1 | 1 | 2 |
* formerly known as: "Super 9" (1996–1999); "Tennis Masters Series" (2000–2003); "ATP Masters Series" (2004–2008)

This is a list of the main career statistics of Swedish professional tennis player, Robin Söderling. To date, Söderling has won ten ATP singles titles including one ATP Masters 1000 title at the 2010 BNP Paribas Masters. He was also the runner-up at the French Open in 2009 and 2010 and a semi-finalist at the year-ending ATP World Tour Finals in 2009. Söderling achieved a career high singles ranking of World No. 4 on November 15, 2010.

Söderling remained inactive from July 2011 until his retirement in December 2015. He initially sustained a wrist injury and was later diagnosed with mononucleosis.

== Career achievements ==
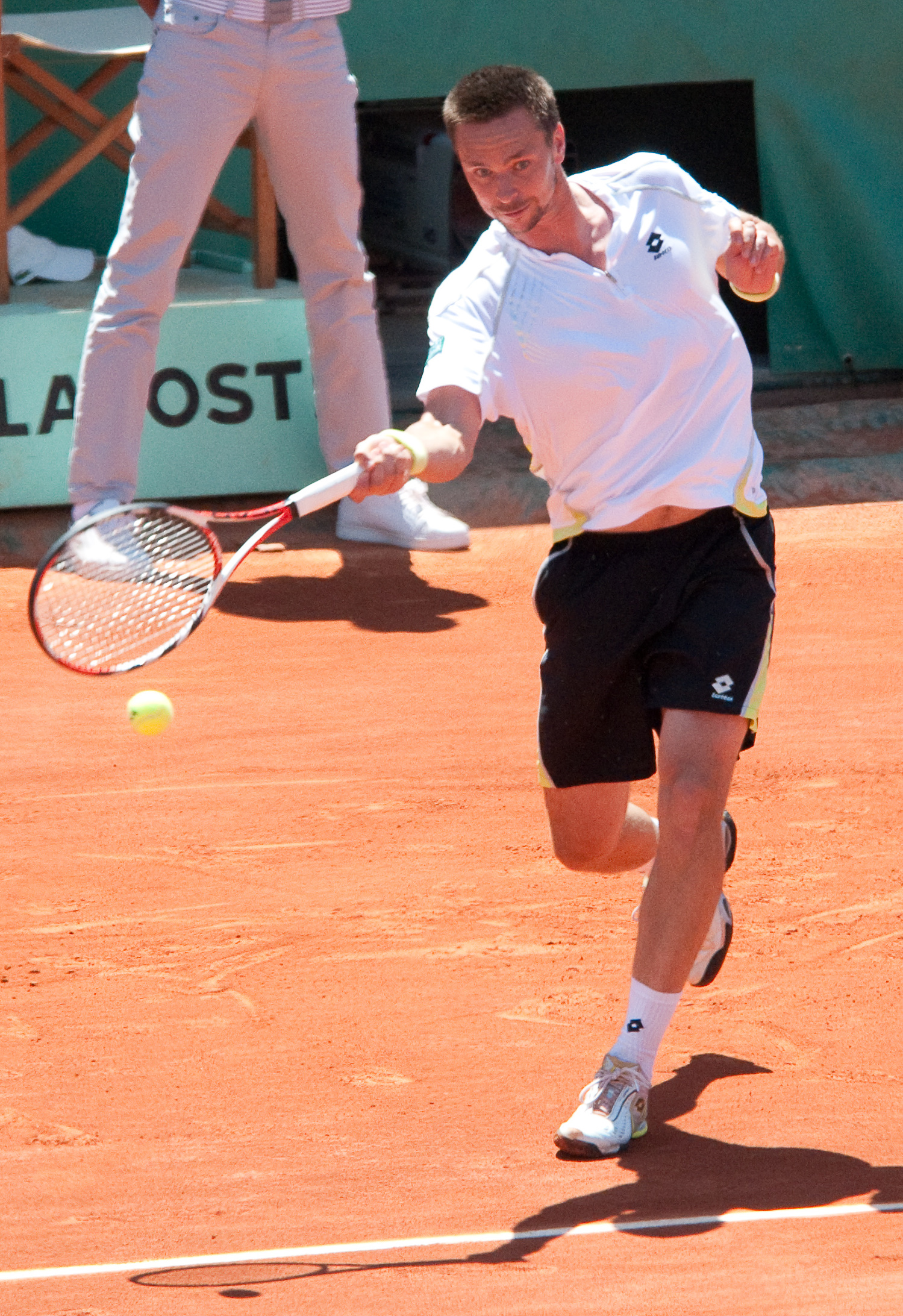
Söderling reached the French Open finals in 2009 and 2010.

In 2009, Söderling made history by becoming the first of two players (the other being Novak Djokovic in 2015) to defeat Rafael Nadal at the French Open. He prevailed in four sets and eventually reached his first grand slam singles final at the event where he lost to then World No. 2 Roger Federer in straight sets, allowing the Swiss to complete a Career Grand Slam in the process. Söderling reached the top ten of the ATP Singles Rankings for the first time in his career later that year and qualified for the year-ending ATP World Tour Finals where he lost in the semi-finals to eventual runner-up, Juan Martín del Potro in three sets. Nonetheless, Söderling finished the year at a then career high of World No. 8.

His good form carried over into 2010 as he reached the semifinals of an ATP Masters 1000 event for the first time at the 2010 BNP Paribas Open where he lost to seventh seed and eventual runner-up Andy Roddick in three sets. In June, Söderling reached his second consecutive final at the French Open, defeating World No. 2 and defending champion Roger Federer for the first time in his career at an ATP level match en route. This win also ended Federer's streak of 23 consecutive semifinal appearances at the grand slams. However, Söderling was not able to cause the same upset he had the previous year, losing to Nadal in straight sets in the final. At the remaining grand slams, Söderling reached the quarterfinals of Wimbledon for the first time in his career where he lost to Nadal in four sets and the quarterfinals of the US Open for the second year in a row where he lost once again to Federer. In November of the same year, Söderling won his first major singles title at the BNP Paribas Masters, defeating Frenchman Gaël Monfils in the final. The win also earned Söderling a new career high singles ranking of World No. 4.

In January 2011, Söderling reached the fourth round of the Australian Open for the first time in his career, but lost to unseeded Ukrainian, Alexandr Dolgopolov in five sets. In February of the same year, Söderling completed a successful title defense for the first time in his career by winning his second consecutive title at the ABN AMRO World Tennis Tournament.

== Major finals ==
=== Grand Slam Finals ===
==== Singles: 2 (2 runner-ups) ====
| Result | Year | Championship | Surface | Opponent | Score |
|---|---|---|---|---|---|
| Loss | 2009 | French Open | Clay | (Switzerland) Roger Federer | 1–6, 6–7^{(1–7)}, 4–6 |
| Loss | 2010 | French Open | Clay | (Spain) Rafael Nadal | 4–6, 2–6, 4–6 |

=== ATP Masters 1000 Finals ===
==== Singles: 1 (1 title) ====
| Result | Year | Tournament | Surface | Opponent | Score |
|---|---|---|---|---|---|
| Win | 2010 | Paris | Hard (i) | (France) Gaël Monfils | 6–1, 7–6^{(7–1)} |

== ATP career finals ==
=== Singles: 20 (10 titles, 10 runner-ups) ===
| Legend Grand Slam tournaments (0–2) ATP World Tour Finals (0–0) ATP Masters Series / ATP World Tour Masters 1000 (1–0) ATP International Series Gold / ATP World Tour 500 Series (2–4) ATP International Series / ATP World Tour 250 Series (7–4) | Titles by surface Hard (5–6) Clay (2–4) Grass (0–0) Carpet (3–0) | Titles by setting Outdoor (3–4) Indoor (7–6) |

| Result | W–L | Date | Tournament | Tier | Surface | Opponent | Score |
|---|---|---|---|---|---|---|---|
| Loss | 0–1 | Oct 2003 | Stockholm Open, Sweden | International | Hard (i) | (United States) Mardy Fish | 5–7, 6–3, 6–7^{(4–7)} |
| Loss | 0–2 | Feb 2004 | Open 13, France | International | Hard (i) | (Slovakia) Dominik Hrbatý | 6–4, 4–6, 4–6 |
| Win | 1–2 | Oct 2004 | Grand Prix de Tennis de Lyon, France | International | Carpet (i) | (Belgium) Xavier Malisse | 6–2, 3–6, 6–4 |
| Win | 2–2 | Feb 2005 | Internazionali di Lombardia, Italy | International | Carpet (i) | (Czech Republic) Radek Štěpánek | 6–3, 6–7^{(2–7)}, 7–6^{(7–5)} |
| Loss | 2–3 | Feb 2006 | US Indoor Championships, United States | Intl. Gold | Hard (i) | (Germany) Tommy Haas | 3–6, 2–6 |
| Loss | 2–4 | Feb 2008 | Rotterdam Open, Netherlands | Intl. Gold | Hard (i) | (France) Michaël Llodra | 7–6^{(7–3)}, 3–6, 6–7^{(4–7)} |
| Loss | 2–5 | Feb 2008 | US Indoor Championships, United States | Intl. Gold | Hard (i) | (Belgium) Steve Darcis | 3–6, 6–7^{(5–7)} |
| Loss | 2–6 | Oct 2008 | Stockholm Open, Sweden | International | Hard (i) | (Argentina) David Nalbandian | 2–6, 7–5, 3–6 |
| Win | 3–6 | Oct 2008 | Grand Prix de Tennis de Lyon, France (2) | International | Carpet (i) | (France) Julien Benneteau | 6–3, 6–7^{(5–7)}, 6–1 |
| Loss | 3–7 | Jun 2009 | French Open, France | Grand Slam | Clay | (Switzerland) Roger Federer | 1–6, 6–7^{(1–7)}, 4–6 |
| Win | 4–7 | Jul 2009 | Swedish Open, Sweden | 250 Series | Clay | (Argentina) Juan Mónaco | 6–3, 7–6^{(7–4)} |
| Win | 5–7 | Feb 2010 | Rotterdam Open, Netherlands | 500 Series | Hard (i) | (Russia) Mikhail Youzhny | 6–4, 2–0 ret. |
| Loss | 5–8 | Apr 2010 | Barcelona Open, Spain | 500 Series | Clay | (Spain) Fernando Verdasco | 3–6, 6–4, 3–6 |
| Loss | 5–9 | Jun 2010 | French Open, France | Grand Slam | Clay | (Spain) Rafael Nadal | 4–6, 2–6, 4–6 |
| Loss | 5–10 | Jul 2010 | Swedish Open, Sweden | 250 Series | Clay | (Spain) Nicolás Almagro | 5–7, 6–3, 2–6 |
| Win | 6–10 | Nov 2010 | Paris Masters, France | Masters 1000 | Hard (i) | (France) Gaël Monfils | 6–1, 7–6^{(7–1)} |
| Win | 7–10 | Jan 2011 | Brisbane International, Australia | 250 Series | Hard | (United States) Andy Roddick | 6–3, 7–5 |
| Win | 8–10 | Feb 2011 | Rotterdam Open, Netherlands (2) | 500 Series | Hard (i) | (France) Jo-Wilfried Tsonga | 6–3, 3–6, 6–3 |
| Win | 9–10 | Feb 2011 | Open 13, France | 250 Series | Hard (i) | (Croatia) Marin Čilić | 6–7^{(8–10)}, 6–3, 6–3 |
| Win | 10–10 | Jul 2011 | Swedish Open, Sweden (2) | 250 Series | Clay | (Spain) David Ferrer | 6–2, 6–2 |

=== Doubles: 2 (1 title, 1 runner-up) ===
| Legend Grand Slam tournaments (0–0) ATP World Tour Finals (0–0) ATP Masters Series / ATP World Tour Masters 1000 (0–0) ATP International Series Gold / ATP World Tour 500 Series (0–0) ATP International Series / ATP World Tour 250 Series (1–1) | Titles by surface Hard (0–0) Clay (1–1) Grass (0–0) | Titles by setting Outdoor (1–1) Indoor (0–0) |

| Result | W–L | Date | Tournament | Tier | Surface | Partner | Opponents | Score |
|---|---|---|---|---|---|---|---|---|
| Win | 1–0 | Jul 2008 | Swedish Open, Sweden | International | Clay | (Sweden) Jonas Björkman | (Sweden) Johan Brunström (Netherlands Antilles) Jean-Julien Rojer | 6–2, 6–2 |
| Loss | 1–1 | Jul 2009 | Swedish Open, Sweden | 250 Series | Clay | (Sweden) Robert Lindstedt | (Czech Republic) Jaroslav Levinský (Slovakia) Filip Polášek | 6–1, 3–6, [7–10] |

=== Team competition wins ===
- 2008 – World Team Championship, Düsseldorf, Germany (Clay)

== Singles performance timeline ==
Key
| W | F | SF | QF | #R | RR | Q# | P# | DNQ | A | Z# | PO | G | S | B | NMS | NTI | P | NH |

(W) winner; (F) finalist; (SF) semifinalist; (QF) quarterfinalist; (#R) rounds 4, 3, 2, 1; (RR) round-robin stage; (Q#) qualification round; (P#) preliminary round; (DNQ) did not qualify; (A) absent; (Z#) Davis/Fed Cup Zonal Group (with number indication) or (PO) play-off; (G) gold, (S) silver or (B) bronze Olympic/Paralympic medal; (NMS) not a Masters tournament; (NTI) not a Tier I tournament; (P) postponed; (NH) not held; (SR) strike rate (events won / competed); (W–L) win–loss record.

Söderling officially retired from tennis at the end of the 2015 ATP World Tour.

| Tournament | 2001 | 2002 | 2003 | 2004 | 2005 | 2006 | 2007 | 2008 | 2009 | 2010 | 2011 | SR | W–L | Win % |
|---|---|---|---|---|---|---|---|---|---|---|---|---|---|---|
Grand Slam tournaments
| Australian Open | A | A | Q2 | 2R | 1R | A | 1R | A | 2R | 1R | 4R | 0 / 6 | 5–6 | 45% |
| French Open | A | A | Q1 | 1R | 2R | 1R | 1R | 3R | F | F | QF | 0 / 8 | 19–8 | 70% |
| Wimbledon | A | A | 3R | 1R | 1R | 1R | 3R | 2R | 4R | QF | 3R | 0 / 9 | 14–9 | 61% |
| US Open | A | 2R | 1R | 2R | 3R | 2R | A | 1R | QF | QF | A | 0 / 8 | 13–8 | 62% |
| Win–loss | 0-0 | 1–1 | 2–2 | 2–4 | 3–4 | 1–3 | 2–3 | 3–3 | 14–4 | 14–4 | 9–3 | 0 / 31 | 51–31 | 62% |
Year-end championships
| ATP World Tour Finals | did not qualify | | | | | | | | SF | RR | DNQ | 0 / 2 | 3–4 | 43% |
Davis Cup
| Davis Cup Singles | A | A | A | QF | A | PO | SF | QF | PO | PO | 1R | 0 / 7 | 13–3 | 81% |
Olympic Games
| Summer Olympics | not held | | | 1R | not held | | | 1R | not held | | | 0 / 2 | 0–2 | 0% |
ATP World Tour Masters 1000
| Indian Wells Masters | A | A | A | 2R | A | 3R | 3R | 2R | 2R | SF | 3R | 0 / 7 | 10–7 | 59% |
| Miami Masters | A | A | A | 2R | A | A | A | 3R | 2R | SF | 3R | 0 / 5 | 8–5 | 62% |
| Monte Carlo Masters | A | A | A | 1R | 1R | 3R | QF | 2R | 1R | A | A | 0 / 6 | 6–6 | 50% |
| Madrid Masters^{1} | A | A | A | 1R | 2R | 3R | 2R | 3R | 2R | 2R | QF | 0 / 8 | 9–8 | 53% |
| Rome Masters | A | A | A | 1R | 1R | A | 2R | 1R | 3R | 3R | QF | 0 / 7 | 6–7 | 46% |
| Canada Masters | A | A | A | 2R | 2R | 1R | 1R | 3R | A | 3R | A | 0 / 6 | 5–6 | 45% |
| Cincinnati Masters | A | A | A | 3R | 2R | 3R | A | 3R | 1R | 3R | A | 0 / 6 | 8–6 | 57% |
| Shanghai Masters^{2} | A | A | A | 2R | A | 3R | A | 2R | QF | QF | A | 0 / 5 | 9–5 | 64% |
| Paris Masters | A | A | A | QF | A | 2R | A | 2R | QF | W | A | 1 / 5 | 11–4 | 73% |
| Win–loss | 0-0 | 0–0 | 0–0 | 9–9 | 3–5 | 10–7 | 6–5 | 12–9 | 8–8 | 18–7 | 6–4 | 1 / 55 | 72–54 | 57% |
Career statistics
| Tournaments played | 1 | 5 | 6 | 28 | 19 | 22 | 16 | 22 | 23 | 23 | 14 | 176 | | |
| Titles | 0 | 0 | 0 | 1 | 1 | 0 | 0 | 1 | 1 | 2 | 4 | 10 | | |
| Finals reached | 0 | 0 | 1 | 2 | 1 | 1 | 0 | 4 | 2 | 5 | 4 | 20 | | |
| Overall win–loss | 1–1 | 1–5 | 10–6 | 31–28 | 16–18 | 35–23 | 27–16 | 45–21 | 49–21 | 57–22 | 38–9 | 10 / 176 | 310–170 | 65% |
| Win % | 50% | 17% | 63% | 53% | 47% | 60% | 63% | 68% | 70% | 72% | 81% | 65% | | |
| Year-end ranking | 443 | 176 | 59 | 34 | 77 | 25 | 41 | 17 | 8 | 5 | 13 | $10,423,124 | | |

^{1}Held as Hamburg Masters till 2008. ^{2}Held as Madrid Masters till 2008.

== Head-to-head record vs. Top 10 ranked players ==
Söderling's win-loss record against players who have been ranked World No. 10 or higher is as follows:

Players who are currently playing on tour are marked in bold face.

| **Player** | **Record** | **W%** | **Hardcourt** | **Clay** | **Grass** | **Carpet** |
Number 1 ranked players
| (United States) Andy Roddick | 4–2 | 66.7% | 3–2 | 0–0 | 0–0 | 1–0 |
| (Spain) Juan Carlos Ferrero | 1–1 | 50% | 1–1 | 0–0 | 0–0 | 0–0 |
| (United Kingdom) Andy Murray | 2–3 | 40% | 2–3 | 0–0 | 0–0 | 0–0 |
| (Australia) Lleyton Hewitt | 2–3 | 40% | 1–3 | 0–0 | 1–0 | 0–0 |
| (Spain) Rafael Nadal | 2–6 | 25.0% | 1–0 | 1–4 | 0–2 | 0–0 |
| (Serbia and Montenegro) / (Serbia) **Novak Djokovic** | 1–6 | 14.3% | 1–4 | 0–2 | 0–0 | 0–0 |
| (Switzerland) Roger Federer | 1–16 | 5.9% | 0–9 | 1–4 | 0–3 | 0–0 |
| (Chile) Marcelo Ríos | 0–1 | 0% | 0–1 | 0–0 | 0–0 | 0–0 |
| (Spain) Carlos Moyà | 0–2 | 0% | 0–0 | 0–2 | 0–0 | 0–0 |
| (Russia) Marat Safin | 0–2 | 0% | 0–1 | 0–0 | 0–0 | 0–1 |
Number 2 ranked players
| (Germany) Tommy Haas | 1–3 | 25% | 0–2 | 1–0 | 0–1 | 0–0 |
Number 3 ranked players
| (Croatia) **Marin Čilić** | 2–0 | 100% | 1–0 | 1–0 | 0–0 | 0–0 |
| (Spain) David Ferrer | 10–4 | 71.4% | 4–2 | 4–2 | 2–0 | 0–0 |
| (Russia) Nikolay Davydenko | 7–4 | 63.6% | 4–4 | 3–0 | 0–0 | 0–0 |
| (Switzerland) **Stanislas Wawrinka** | 2–2 | 50% | 2–1 | 0–1 | 0–0 | 0–0 |
| (Croatia) Ivan Ljubičić | 2–3 | 40% | 2–3 | 0–0 | 0–0 | 0–0 |
| (Argentina) Juan Martín del Potro | 1–4 | 20% | 0–4 | 0–0 | 0–0 | 1–0 |
| (Argentina) David Nalbandian | 1–6 | 14.3% | 0–3 | 1–3 | 0–0 | 0–0 |
| (Argentina) Guillermo Coria | 0–1 | 0% | 0–1 | 0–0 | 0–0 | 0–0 |
Number 4 ranked players
| (Sweden) Jonas Björkman | 3–0 | 100% | 2–0 | 0–0 | 1–0 | 0–0 |
| (France) Sébastien Grosjean | 3–0 | 100% | 2–0 | 0–0 | 1–0 | 0–0 |
| (Sweden) Thomas Enqvist | 3–1 | 75% | 3–1 | 0–0 | 0–0 | 0–0 |
| (Czech Republic) Tomáš Berdych | 6–3 | 66.7% | 3–2 | 2–1 | 1–0 | 0–0 |
| (United States) James Blake | 2–1 | 66.7% | 0–1 | 2–0 | 0–0 | 0–0 |
| (United Kingdom) Tim Henman | 0–2 | 0% | 0–0 | 0–0 | 0–2 | 0–0 |
Number 5 ranked players
| (France) Jo-Wilfried Tsonga | 4–0 | 100% | 3–0 | 1–0 | 0–0 | 0–0 |
| (Spain) Tommy Robredo | 5–1 | 83.3% | 3–0 | 1–1 | 0–0 | 1–0 |
| (Germany) Rainer Schüttler | 3–2 | 60% | 2–0 | 0–1 | 1–1 | 0–0 |
| (Chile) Fernando González | 5–4 | 55.5% | 4–2 | 1–2 | 0–0 | 0–0 |
| (Argentina) Gastón Gaudio | 1–1 | 50% | 0–0 | 1–1 | 0–0 | 0–0 |
Number 6 ranked players
| (France) **Gaël Monfils** | 3–0 | 100% | 2–0 | 0–0 | 0–0 | 1–0 |
| (France) Gilles Simon | 4–2 | 66.7% | 2–2 | 0–0 | 0–0 | 2–0 |
| (Ecuador) Nicolás Lapentti | 0–1 | 0% | 0–1 | 0–0 | 0–0 | 0–0 |
Number 7 ranked players
| (Spain) Fernando Verdasco | 5–2 | 71.4% | 2–1 | 3–1 | 0–0 | 0–0 |
| (France) Richard Gasquet | 2–3 | 40% | 2–1 | 0–0 | 0–1 | 0–1 |
| (Sweden) Thomas Johansson | 1–2 | 33.3% | 1–1 | 0–1 | 0–0 | 0–0 |
| (Croatia) Mario Ančić | 0–1 | 0% | 0–1 | 0–0 | 0–0 | 0–0 |
| (United States) Mardy Fish | 0–2 | 0% | 0–2 | 0–0 | 0–0 | 0–0 |
Number 8 ranked players
| (Argentina) Guillermo Cañas | 2–0 | 100% | 1–0 | 1–0 | 0–0 | 0–0 |
| (Austria) Jürgen Melzer | 2–0 | 100% | 2–0 | 0–0 | 0–0 | 0–0 |
| (Russia) Mikhail Youzhny | 5–1 | 83.3% | 4–1 | 1–0 | 0–0 | 0–0 |
| (Czech Republic) Radek Štěpánek | 5–2 | 71.4% | 3–1 | 1–1 | 0–0 | 1–0 |
| (Cyprus) Marcos Baghdatis | 3–2 | 60% | 3–2 | 0–0 | 0–1 | 0–0 |
| (Australia) Mark Philippoussis | 1–1 | 50% | 1–1 | 0–0 | 0–0 | 0–0 |
Number 9 ranked players
| (Chile) Nicolás Massú | 1–0 | 100% | 0–0 | 0–0 | 0–0 | 1–0 |
| (Serbia and Montenegro) / (Serbia) Janko Tipsarević | 2–0 | 100% | 1–0 | 0–0 | 1–0 | 0–0 |
| (Spain) Nicolás Almagro | 5–3 | 62.5% | 2–0 | 2–3 | 1–0 | 0–0 |
| (Sweden) Joachim Johansson | 1–1 | 50% | 0–0 | 0–0 | 0–1 | 1–0 |
| (Thailand) Paradorn Srichaphan | 0–2 | 0% | 0–1 | 0–0 | 0–1 | 0–0 |
Number 10 ranked players
| (France) Arnaud Clément | 2–0 | 100% | 1–0 | 0–0 | 0–0 | 1–0 |

* Statistics include Davis Cup matches.

== Top 10 Wins per season ==
| Season | 2001 | 2002 | 2003 | 2004 | 2005 | 2006 | 2007 | 2008 | 2009 | 2010 | 2011 |
| Wins | 0 | 0 | 0 | 1 | 0 | 2 | 3 | 5 | 7 | 5 | 5 |

=== Wins over Top 10s per season ===
| # | Player | Rank | Event | Surface | Rd | Score |
2004
| 1. | (Germany) Rainer Schüttler | 6 | Australian Open, Melbourne, Australia | Hard | 1R | 4–6, 4–6, 7–5, 6–3, 6–4 |
2006
| 2. | (Russia) Nikolay Davydenko | 6 | Monte Carlo, Monaco | Clay | 1R | 6–3, 2–6, 6–4 |
| 3. | (Cyprus) Marcos Baghdatis | 8 | New Haven, US | Hard | 3R | 6–3, 6–7^{(3–7)}, 7–5 |
2007
| 4. | (Russia) Nikolay Davydenko | 3 | Marseille, France | Hard (i) | 1R | 3–6, 6–4, 6–1 |
| 5. | (Russia) Nikolay Davydenko | 3 | Monte Carlo, Monaco | Clay | 2R | 6–4, 6–7^{(6–8)}, 6–3 |
| 6. | (United States) James Blake | 8 | World Team Cup, Düsseldorf, Germany | Clay | RR | 6–3, 6–3 |
2008
| 7. | (France) Richard Gasquet | 7 | Marseille, France | Hard (i) | 2R | 4–6, 6–3, 6–2 |
| 8. | (United States) Andy Roddick | 6 | Memphis, US | Hard (i) | QF | 7–6^{(8–6)}, 6–3 |
| 9. | (United States) James Blake | 8 | World Team Cup, Düsseldorf, Germany | Clay | RR | 5–7, 6–3, 6–0 |
| 10. | (United States) Andy Roddick | 7 | Lyon, France | Hard (i) | QF | 7–6^{(7–5)}, 7–6^{(7–5)} |
| 11. | (France) Gilles Simon | 10 | Lyon, France | Hard (i) | SF | 5–7, 6–3, 6–3 |
2009
| 12. | (France) Gilles Simon | 7 | World Team Cup, Düsseldorf, Germany | Clay | RR | 4–6, 6–2, 6–0 |
| 13. | (Spain) Rafael Nadal | 1 | French Open, Paris, France | Clay | 4R | 6–2, 6–7^{(2–7)}, 6–4, 7–6^{(7–2)} |
| 14. | (Russia) Nikolay Davydenko | 8 | US Open, New York, US | Hard | 4R | 7–5, 3–6, 6–2, ret. |
| 15. | (France) Jo-Wilfried Tsonga | 7 | Shanghai, China | Hard | 3R | 6–3, 6–3 |
| 16. | (Russia) Nikolay Davydenko | 7 | Paris, France | Hard (i) | 3R | 6–3, 3–6, 6–4 |
| 17. | (Spain) Rafael Nadal | 2 | ATP World Tour Finals, London, UK | Hard (i) | RR | 6–4, 6–4 |
| 18. | (Serbia) Novak Djokovic | 3 | ATP World Tour Finals, London, UK | Hard (i) | RR | 7–6^{(7–5)}, 6–1 |
2010
| 19. | (Russia) Nikolay Davydenko | 6 | Rotterdam, Netherlands | Hard (i) | SF | 7–6^{(7–3)}, 6–4 |
| 20. | (United Kingdom) Andy Murray | 4 | Indian Wells, US | Hard | QF | 6–1, 7–6^{(7–4)} |
| 21. | (Switzerland) Roger Federer | 1 | French Open, Paris, France | Clay | QF | 3–6, 6–3, 7–5, 6–4 |
| 22. | (United States) Andy Roddick | 8 | Paris, France | Hard (i) | QF | 7–5, 6–4 |
| 23. | (Spain) David Ferrer | 7 | ATP World Tour Finals, London, UK | Hard (i) | RR | 7–5, 7–5 |
2011
| 24. | (United States) Andy Roddick | 8 | Brisbane, Australia | Hard | F | 6–3, 7–5 |
| 25. | (Russia) Mikhail Youzhny | 10 | Rotterdam, Netherlands | Hard (i) | QF | 6–4, 7–6^{(7–5)} |
| 26. | (Spain) Nicolás Almagro | 10 | Rome, Italy | Clay | 3R | 6–3, 3–6, 6–4 |
| 27. | (Czech Republic) Tomáš Berdych | 8 | Båstad, Sweden | Clay | SF | 6–1, 6–0 |
| 28. | (Spain) David Ferrer | 6 | Båstad, Sweden | Clay | F | 6–2, 6–2 |

== ATP Tour career earnings ==
| Year | Majors | ATP titles | Total titles | Earnings ($) | Money list rank |
|---|---|---|---|---|---|
| 2002 | 0 | 0 | 0 | $56,770 | 226 |
| 2003 | 0 | 0 | 0 | $177,867 | 119 |
| 2004 | 0 | 1 | 1 | $539,085 | 39 |
| 2005 | 0 | 1 | 1 | $294,785 | 81 |
| 2006 | 0 | 0 | 0 | $477,635 | 46 |
| 2007 | 0 | 0 | 0 | $428,420 | 57 |
| 2008 | 0 | 1 | 1 | $1,059,966 | 12 |
| 2009 | 0 | 1 | 1 | $2,313,785 | 8 |
| 2010 | 0 | 2 | 2 | $3,731,527 | 5 |
| 2011 | 0 | 4 | 4 | 1,323,835 | 11 |
| Career | 0 | 10 | 10 | 10,423,124 | 37 |

== Career Grand Slam seedings ==
The tournaments won by Soderling are in boldface, while those where he was runner-up are italicized.

| Year | Australian Open | French Open | Wimbledon | US Open |
|---|---|---|---|---|
| 2002 | did not play | did not play | did not play | qualifier |
| 2003 | Lost Qualifying | Lost Qualifying | qualifier | qualifier |
| 2004 | not seeded | not seeded | not seeded | not seeded |
| 2005 | not seeded | 33rd | 30th | not seeded |
| 2006 | did not play | not seeded | not seeded | not seeded |
| 2007 | 23rd | 25th | 28th | did not play |
| 2008 | did not play | not seeded | not seeded | not seeded |
| 2009 | 16th | 23rd | 13th | 12th |
| 2010 | 8th | 5th | 6th | 5th |
| 2011 | 4th | 5th | 5th | did not play |
