= 2002 Swedish Open – Doubles =

Doubles
- 2002 Swedish Open

Final
- Champions: (Sweden) Jonas Björkman (Australia) Todd Woodbridge
- Runners-up: (Australia) Paul Hanley (Australia) Michael Hill
- Score: 7–6^{(8–6)}, 6–4

Events
Singles	Doubles
← 2001 ·	Swedish Open	· 2003 →

Karsten Braasch and Jens Knippschild were the defending champions but only Braasch competed that year with Thomas Shimada.

Braasch and Shimada lost in the first round to David Adams and Andrew Kratzmann.

Jonas Björkman and Todd Woodbridge won in the final 7–6^{(8–6)}, 6–4 against Paul Hanley and Michael Hill.

== Seeds ==
1. (Sweden) Jonas Björkman / (Australia) Todd Woodbridge (champions)
2. (Australia) Paul Hanley / (Australia) Michael Hill (final)
3. (South Africa) David Adams / (Australia) Andrew Kratzmann (semifinals)
4. (Argentina) Lucas Arnold / (Argentina) Guillermo Cañas (semifinals)

== Draw ==
=== Key ===
- Q = Qualifier
- WC = Wild card
- LL = Lucky loser
- Alt = Alternate
- SE = Special exempt
- PR = Protected ranking
- ITF = ITF entry
- JE = Junior exempt
- w/o = Walkover
- r = Retired
- d = Defaulted
- SR = Special ranking

First round
1	(Sweden) J Björkman (Australia) T Woodbridge	6	6
WC	(Spain) M Marco Ripoll (Spain) C Moyá	4	3
(Argentina) A Calleri (Spain) T Robredo	7	6
(United States) D Bowen (Australia) A Fisher	5	2
3	(South Africa) D Adams (Australia) A Kratzmann	7^{7}	7^{10}
(Germany) K Braasch (Japan) T Shimada	6^{3}	6^{8}
(Argentina) M García (Argentina) L Lobo	2	1
(Slovakia) D Hrbatý (United States) J Tarango	6	6
WC	(Sweden) M Larsson (Sweden) A Vinciguerra	6^{4}	6	6
(North Macedonia) A Kitinov (Sweden) J Landsberg	7^{7}	2	4
(Morocco) Y El Aynaoui (Spain) A Portas	3	6	2
4	(Argentina) L Arnold (Argentina) G Cañas	6	3	6
(Sweden) S Aspelin (South Africa) M Wakefield	3^{r}
WC	(Sweden) J Johansson (Sweden) M Norman	4
(South Africa) M Barnard (Australia) S Huss	2	7^{7}	3
2	(Australia) P Hanley (Australia) M Hill	6	6^{2}	6

Quarterfinals
1	(Sweden) J Björkman (Australia) T Woodbridge	4	6	6
(Argentina) A Calleri (Spain) T Robredo	6	2	3
3	(South Africa) D Adams (Australia) A Kratzmann	6^{6}	6	6
(Slovakia) D Hrbatý (United States) J Tarango	7^{8}	4	4
WC	(Sweden) M Larsson (Sweden) A Vinciguerra	6^{5}	6	5
4	(Argentina) L Arnold (Argentina) G Cañas	7^{7}	2	7
WC	(Sweden) J Johansson (Sweden) M Norman	1	6^{4}
2	(Australia) P Hanley (Australia) M Hill	6	7^{7}

Semifinals
1	(Sweden) J Björkman (Australia) T Woodbridge	6	6
3	(South Africa) D Adams (Australia) A Kratzmann	1	2
4	(Argentina) L Arnold (Argentina) G Cañas	6	2	1
2	(Australia) P Hanley (Australia) M Hill	4	6	6

Final
1	(Sweden) J Björkman (Australia) T Woodbridge	7^{8}	6
2	(Australia) P Hanley (Australia) M Hill	6^{6}	4
