= 2008 Swedish Open – Singles =

Singles
- 2008 Swedish Open

Final
- Champion: (Spain) Tommy Robredo
- Runner-up: (Czech Republic) Tomáš Berdych
- Score: 6–4, 6–1

Details
- Draw: 28 (4Q / 3WC)
- Seeds: 8

Events
Singles	Doubles
← 2007 ·	Swedish Open	· 2009 →

David Ferrer was the defending champion, but lost in the semifinals to Tommy Robredo.

Thirds-seeded Tommy Robredo won in the final 6–4, 6–1, against fourth-seeded Tomáš Berdych.

== Seeds ==
The top four seeds receive a bye into the second round.

1. (Spain) David Ferrer (semifinals)
2. (Spain) Fernando Verdasco (semifinals)
3. (Spain) Tommy Robredo (champion)
4. (Czech Republic) Tomáš Berdych (final)
5. (Spain) Carlos Moyá (first round)
6. (France) Gaël Monfils (withdrew due to an ankle injury)
7. (Finland) Jarkko Nieminen (quarterfinals)
8. (Sweden) Robin Söderling (quarterfinals)

== Draw ==
Key

- Q = Qualifier
- WC = Wild card
- LL = Lucky loser
- Alt = Alternate
- ITF = ITF entry
- PR = Protected ranking
- SR = Special ranking
- SE = Special exempt
- JE = Junior exempt
- JR = Junior Accelerator Programme entrant
- CO = College Accelerator Programme entrant
- NG = Next Gen Accelerator Program entrant
- w/o = Walkover
- r = Retired
- d = Defaulted

=== Finals ===
Semifinals
1	(Spain) David Ferrer	6	1	2
3	(Spain) Tommy Robredo	2	6	6
4	(Czech Republic) Tomáš Berdych	2	6	6
2	(Spain) Fernando Verdasco	6	3	2

Final
3	(Spain) Tommy Robredo	6	6
4	(Czech Republic) Tomáš Berdych	4	1

=== Top half ===
First round
Q	(Chile) N Massú	2	3
(Serbia) B Pašanski	6	6
(France) M Gicquel	3	4
(Belgium) O Rochus	6	6
(Italy) F Fognini	1	7^{7}	5
8	(Sweden) R Söderling	6	6^{4}	7
(Spain) M Granollers	3	1
(Sweden) J Björkman	6	6
Q	(Austria) D Köllerer	6^{4}	0
(Belgium) S Darcis	7^{7}	6
(Argentina) S Roitman	4	2
7	(Finland) J Nieminen	6	6

Second round
1	(Spain) D Ferrer	7	6
(Serbia) B Pašanski	5	1
(Belgium) O Rochus	3	3
8	(Sweden) R Söderling	6	6
3	(Spain) T Robredo	6	6
(Sweden) J Björkman	2	3
(Belgium) S Darcis	3	1
7	(Finland) J Nieminen	6	6

Quarterfinals
1	(Spain) D Ferrer	7	6^{3}	6
8	(Sweden) R Söderling	5	7^{7}	1
3	(Spain) T Robredo	6	7^{7}
7	(Finland) J Nieminen	2	6^{4}

Semifinals
1	(Spain) D Ferrer	6	1	2
3	(Spain) T Robredo	2	6	6

=== Bottom half ===
First round
5	(Spain) C Moyá	7^{7}	6^{6}	4
(Italy) P Starace	6^{4}	7^{8}	6
Q	(Spain) M López	6^{6}	5
(Russia) M Safin	7^{8}	7
(Sweden) T Johansson	7^{7}	6
WC	(Sweden) F Prpic	6^{4}	3
LL	(Sweden) T Göransson	1	2
WC	(Sweden) M Ryderstedt	6	6
LL	(Poland) M Przysiężny	5	2
Q	(Sweden) B Rehnquist	7	6
WC	(Sweden) E Eleskovic	6	6
(Italy) F Volandri	4	4

Second round
(Italy) P Starace	7^{7}	3	6
(Russia) M Safin	6^{4}	6	4
(Sweden) T Johansson	6^{2}	2
4	(Czech Republic) T Berdych	7^{7}	6
WC	(Sweden) M Ryderstedt	3	5
Q	(Sweden) B Rehnquist	6	7
WC	(Sweden) E Eleskovic	0	2^{r}
2	(Spain) F Verdasco	6	4

Quarterfinals
(Italy) P Starace	3	2
4	(Czech Republic) T Berdych	6	6
Q	(Sweden) B Rehnquist	6	1	0
2	(Spain) F Verdasco	2	6	6

Semifinals
4	(Czech Republic) T Berdych	2	6	6
2	(Spain) F Verdasco	6	3	2
