= 2001 Telenordia Swedish Open – Doubles =

Doubles
- 2001 Telenordia Swedish Open

Final
- Champions: (Germany) Karsten Braasch (Germany) Jens Knippschild
- Runners-up: (Sweden) Simon Aspelin (Australia) Andrew Kratzmann
- Score: 7–6^{(7–3)}, 4–6, 7–6^{(7–5)}

Events
Singles	Doubles
← 2000 ·	Telenordia Swedish Open	· 2002 →

Nicklas Kulti and Mikael Tillström were the defending champions but did not compete that year.

Karsten Braasch and Jens Knippschild won in the final 7–6^{(7–3)}, 4–6, 7–6^{(7–5)} against Simon Aspelin and Andrew Kratzmann.

== Seeds ==
1. (Australia) Joshua Eagle / (Australia) Andrew Florent (first round)
2. (Argentina) Mariano Hood / (Argentina) Sebastián Prieto (first round)
3. (Sweden) Simon Aspelin / (Australia) Andrew Kratzmann (final)
4. (Germany) Karsten Braasch / (Germany) Jens Knippschild (champions)

== Draw ==
=== Key ===
- Q = Qualifier
- WC = Wild card
- LL = Lucky loser
- Alt = Alternate
- SE = Special exempt
- PR = Protected ranking
- ITF = ITF entry
- JE = Junior exempt
- w/o = Walkover
- r = Retired
- d = Defaulted
- SR = Special ranking

First round
1	(Australia) J Eagle (Australia) A Florent	5	6	6^{3}
(Czech Republic) P Luxa (Czech Republic) R Štěpánek	7	4	7^{7}
(Italy) C Brandi (Italy) M Bertolini	6	6
WC	(Slovakia) D Hrbatý (Czech Republic) D Vacek	1	3
3	(Sweden) S Aspelin (Australia) A Kratzmann	6	4	6
(The Bahamas) M Merklein (United States) J Waite	2	6	2
WC	(Spain) T Robredo (Spain) F Vicente	6^{6}	1
WC	(Sweden) J Landsberg (Sweden) A Vinciguerra	7^{8}	6
(Australia) P Kilderry (Germany) M Kohlmann	6	6
(Italy) A Gaudenzi (Netherlands) S Groen	1	1
(North Macedonia) A Kitinov (Italy) A Schneiter	2	3
4	(Germany) K Braasch (Germany) J Knippschild	6	6
WC	(Sweden) M Gustafsson (Sweden) M Larsson	3	0
(Spain) Á López Morón (Spain) A Portas	6	6
(United States) D Bowen (Australia) A Fisher	6	6
2	(Argentina) M Hood (Argentina) S Prieto	2	3

Quarterfinals
(Czech Republic) P Luxa (Czech Republic) R Štěpánek	6	6
(Italy) C Brandi (Italy) M Bertolini	3	2
3	(Sweden) S Aspelin (Australia) A Kratzmann	6	6
WC	(Sweden) J Landsberg (Sweden) A Vinciguerra	2	3
(Australia) P Kilderry (Germany) M Kohlmann	4	1
4	(Germany) K Braasch (Germany) J Knippschild	6	6
(Spain) Á López Morón (Spain) A Portas	6	6
(United States) D Bowen (Australia) A Fisher	3	3

Semifinals
(Czech Republic) P Luxa (Czech Republic) R Štěpánek	6	6^{5}	6^{5}
3	(Sweden) S Aspelin (Australia) A Kratzmann	1	7^{7}	7^{7}
4	(Germany) K Braasch (Germany) J Knippschild	5	6	6
(Spain) Á López Morón (Spain) A Portas	7	2	3

Final
3	(Sweden) S Aspelin (Australia) A Kratzmann	6^{3}	6	6^{5}
4	(Germany) K Braasch (Germany) J Knippschild	7^{7}	4	7^{7}
