= 2011 If Stockholm Open – Singles Qualifying =

This article displays the qualifying draw of the 2011 If Stockholm Open.

== Players ==
=== Seeds ===
1. (Colombia) Alejandro Falla (qualifying competition)
2. (Germany) Matthias Bachinger (second round)
3. (Germany) Tobias Kamke (qualified)
4. (Chile) Paul Capdeville (first round)
5. (Germany) Cedrik-Marcel Stebe (qualifying competition)
6. (Turkey) Marsel İlhan (first round)
7. (Kazakhstan) Andrey Golubev (qualifying competition)
8. (Spain) Pablo Carreño-Busta (first round)

=== Qualifiers ===
1. (Estonia) Jürgen Zopp
2. (Romania) Marius Copil
3. (Germany) Tobias Kamke
4. (Germany) Sebastian Rieschick

== Qualifying draw ==
=== First qualifier ===
First Round
1	(Colombia) Alejandro Falla	4	6	6
(Poland) Jerzy Janowicz	6	4	2
(Spain) Iñigo Cervantes Huegun	6	6
(Republic of Ireland) Louk Sorensen	3	1
(Finland) Harri Heliövaara	6	6
(Austria) Alexander Peya	4	2
(Estonia) Jürgen Zopp	6	6
6	(Turkey) Marsel İlhan	2	1

Second Round
1	(Colombia) Alejandro Falla	6	2	6
(Spain) Iñigo Cervantes Huegun	3	6	3
(Finland) Harri Heliövaara	4	5
(Estonia) Jürgen Zopp	6	7

Qualifying Competition
1	(Colombia) Alejandro Falla	6^{4}	2
(Estonia) Jürgen Zopp	7^{7}	6

=== Second qualifier ===
First Round
2	(Germany) Matthias Bachinger	7^{8}	6
(United States) Rajeev Ram	6^{6}	0
(United States) Michael Yani	2	2
(Romania) Marius Copil	6	6
(Czech Republic) Jan Hernych	6	7^{7}
(Germany) Peter Gojowczyk	2	6^{3}
(Belgium) Yannick Mertens	3	3
5	(Germany) Cedrik-Marcel Stebe	6	6

Second Round
2	(Germany) Matthias Bachinger	6^{4}	3
(Romania) Marius Copil	7^{7}	6
(Czech Republic) Jan Hernych	1	4
5	(Germany) Cedrik-Marcel Stebe	6	6

Qualifying Competition
(Romania) Marius Copil	6	7
5	(Germany) Cedrik-Marcel Stebe	4	5

=== Third qualifier ===
First Round
3	(Germany) Tobias Kamke	6	3	6
(Bosnia and Herzegovina) Mirza Bašić	1	6	2
WC	(Sweden) Tobias Blömgren	6	5	1
WC	(Sweden) Carl Bergman	2	7	6
(Australia) Peter Luczak	6^{5}	7	7
WC	(Sweden) Lucas Renard	7^{7}	5	5
WC	(Sweden) Stefan Borg	2	6^{5}
7	(Kazakhstan) Andrey Golubev	6	7^{7}

Second Round
3	(Germany) Tobias Kamke	6	6
WC	(Sweden) Carl Bergman	2	3
(Australia) Peter Luczak	6^{5}	6	3
7	(Kazakhstan) Andrey Golubev	7^{7}	4	6

Qualifying Competition
3	(Germany) Tobias Kamke	6	7
7	(Kazakhstan) Andrey Golubev	1	5

=== Fourth qualifier ===
First Round
4	(Chile) Paul Capdeville	0	6	3
(Slovakia) Ivo Klec	6	4	6
(Sweden) Patrik Rosenholm	3	6	5
(Germany) Sebastian Rieschick	6	4	7
(Spain) Guillermo Olaso	2	3
(Germany) Daniel Brands	6	6
(Czech Republic) Ivo Minář	7^{7}	3	6
8	(Spain) Pablo Carreño-Busta	6^{3}	6	1

Second Round
(Slovakia) Ivo Klec	3	6	5
(Germany) Sebastian Rieschick	6	3	7
(Germany) Daniel Brands	6	1	4
(Czech Republic) Ivo Minář	3	6	6

Qualifying Competition
(Germany) Sebastian Rieschick	6	6
(Czech Republic) Ivo Minář	4	4
