= 2009 Swedish Open =

- Date: 6–11 July 11 (women); 13-19 July (men)
- Edition: 1st (women); 62nd (men)
- Surface: Clay / outdoor
- Location: Båstad, Sweden

Champions

Men's singles
- (Sweden) Robin Söderling

Women's singles
- (Spain) María José Martínez Sánchez

Men's doubles
- (Czech Republic) Jaroslav Levinský / (Slovakia) Filip Polášek

Women's doubles
- (Argentina) Gisela Dulko / (Italy) Flavia Pennetta
← 2008 ·	Swedish Open	· 2010 →

The 2009 Collector Swedish Open was a tennis tournament played on outdoor clay courts. It was the 1st edition of the Collector Swedish Open. It took place in Båstad, Sweden, from 6 July through 11 July 2009 for the women and from 13 July through 19 July 2009 for the men. Robin Söderling and María José Martínez Sánchez won the singles title.

== Finals ==
=== Men's singles ===
(Sweden) Robin Söderling defeated (Argentina) Juan Mónaco, 6–3, 7–6^{(7–4)}

- It was Söderling's first title of the year and 4th of his career.

=== Women's singles ===
(Spain) María José Martínez Sánchez defeated (Denmark) Caroline Wozniacki 7–5, 6–4

- It was Martínez Sánchez's second title of the year and career.

=== Men's doubles ===
(Czech Republic) Jaroslav Levinský / (Slovakia) Filip Polášek defeated (Sweden) Robin Söderling / (Sweden) Robert Lindstedt, 1–6, 6–3, [10–7]

=== Women's doubles ===
(Argentina) Gisela Dulko / (Italy) Flavia Pennetta defeated (Spain) Nuria Llagostera Vives / (Spain) María José Martínez Sánchez, 6–2, 0–6, [10–6]

== WTA entrants ==
=== Seeds ===
Player	Nationality	Ranking*	Seeding
Caroline Wozniacki	Denmark	9	1
Dominika Cibulková	Slovakia	13	2
Flavia Pennetta	Italy	15	3
Kaia Kanepi	Estonia	25	4
Sorana Cîrstea	Romania	27	5
Anastasia Pavlyuchenkova	Russia	29	6
Carla Suárez Navarro	Spain	34	7
Iveta Benešová	Czech Republic	35	8

- Seedings are based on the rankings of June 22, 2009.

=== Other entrants ===
The following players received wildcards into the singles main draw

- (Sweden) Ellen Allgurin
- (Sweden) Johanna Larsson
- (Sweden) Sandra Roma

The following players received entry from the qualifying draw:

- (Kyrgyzstan) Ksenia Palkina
- (Sweden) Michaela Johansson
- (Ukraine) Julia Vakulenko
- (Ukraine) Irina Buryachok

== ATP entrants ==
=== Seeds ===
Player	Nationality	Ranking*	Seeding
Fernando Verdasco	Spain	9	1
Robin Söderling	Sweden	12	2
Tommy Robredo	Spain	14	3
Jürgen Melzer	Austria	30	4
Nicolás Almagro	Spain	42	5
Florent Serra	France	52	6
Christophe Rochus	Belgium	57	7
Máximo González	Argentina	58	8

- Seedings are based on the rankings of July 6, 2009.

=== Other entrants ===
The following players received wildcards into the singles main draw

- (Sweden) Daniel Berta
- (Sweden) Andreas Vinciguerra
- (Bulgaria) Grigor Dimitrov

The following players received entry from the qualifying draw:

- (Australia) Peter Luczak
- (Argentina) Guillermo Cañas
- (Italy) Potito Starace
- (Spain) Daniel Gimeno-Traver
