= 2004 Swedish Open – Doubles =

Doubles
- 2004 Swedish Open

Final
- Champions: (India) Mahesh Bhupathi (Sweden) Jonas Björkman
- Runners-up: (Sweden) Simon Aspelin (Australia) Todd Perry
- Score: 4–6, 7–6^{(7–2)}, 7–6^{(8–6)}

Events
Singles	Doubles
← 2003 ·	Swedish Open	· 2005 →

Simon Aspelin and Massimo Bertolini were the defending champions and competed with different partners this year, but were both eliminated by Mahesh Bhupathi and Jonas Björkman. Aspelin (teaming up with Todd Perry) lost in the final, while Bertolini (teaming up with Robbie Koenig) was eliminated at the quarterfinals.

Mahesh Bhupathi and Jonas Björkman won the title by defeating Simon Aspelin and Todd Perry 4–6, 7–6^{(7–2)}, 7–6^{(8–6)} in the final.

== Seeds ==
1. (India) Mahesh Bhupathi / (Sweden) Jonas Björkman (champions)
2. (Argentina) Mariano Hood / (Argentina) Sebastián Prieto (first round)
3. (Germany) Karsten Braasch / (Poland) Mariusz Fyrstenberg (semifinals)
4. (South Africa) Jeff Coetzee / (South Africa) Chris Haggard (first round)

== Draw ==
=== Key ===
- Q = Qualifier
- WC = Wild card
- LL = Lucky loser
- Alt = Alternate
- SE = Special exempt
- PR = Protected ranking
- ITF = ITF entry
- JE = Junior exempt
- w/o = Walkover
- r = Retired
- d = Defaulted
- SR = Special ranking

=== Draw ===
First round
1	(India) M Bhupathi (Sweden) J Björkman	4	6	6
WC	(Sweden) E Eleskovic (Sweden) R Lindstedt	6	3	2
(Italy) M Bertolini (South Africa) R Koenig	2	7	7^{9}
(Australia) M Hill (Sweden) J Landsberg	6	5	6^{7}
3	(Germany) K Braasch (Poland) M Fyrstenberg	6	6
WC	(Sweden) F Prpic (Sweden) B Rehnquist	3	2
(Argentina) JI Chela (Argentina) G Gaudio	6^{4}	7	4
(Finland) J Nieminen (Sweden) R Söderling	7^{7}	5	6
(Peru) L Horna (Argentina) M Zabaleta	6^{5}	6^{5}
(Chile) F González (Chile) N Massú	7^{7}	7^{7}
(Russia) N Davydenko (Spain) A Martín	6	6
4	(South Africa) J Coetzee (South Africa) C Haggard	4	4
(Sweden) S Aspelin (Australia) T Perry	6	6
(Georgia (country)) I Labadze (Russia) M Youzhny	3	4
(Argentina) A Calleri (Spain) T Robredo	6	0	6
2	(Argentina) M Hood (Argentina) S Prieto	4	6	4

Quarterfinals
1	(India) M Bhupathi (Sweden) J Björkman	4	6	6
(Italy) M Bertolini (South Africa) R Koenig	6	1	3
3	(Germany) K Braasch (Poland) M Fyrstenberg	6	1	6
(Finland) J Nieminen (Sweden) R Söderling	4	6	4
(Chile) F González (Chile) N Massú	6	6
(Russia) N Davydenko (Spain) A Martín	3	3
(Sweden) S Aspelin (Australia) T Perry	w/o
(Argentina) A Calleri (Spain) T Robredo

Semifinals
1	(India) M Bhupathi (Sweden) J Björkman	6	6
3	(Germany) K Braasch (Poland) M Fyrstenberg	3	3
(Chile) F González (Chile) N Massú	6	6^{5}	2^{r}
(Sweden) S Aspelin (Australia) T Perry	4	7^{7}	2

Final
1	(India) M Bhupathi (Sweden) J Björkman	4	7^{7}	7^{8}
(Sweden) S Aspelin (Australia) T Perry	6	6^{2}	6^{6}
