= 2007 Swedish Open – Doubles =

Doubles
- 2007 Swedish Open

Final
- Champions: (Sweden) Simon Aspelin (Austria) Julian Knowle
- Runners-up: (Argentina) Martín García (Argentina) Sebastián Prieto
- Score: 6–2, 6–4

Events
Singles	Doubles
← 2006 ·	Swedish Open	· 2008 →

Jonas Björkman and Thomas Johansson were the defending champions, but lost in the semifinals this year.

Simon Aspelin and Julian Knowle won in the final 6–2, 6–4, against Martín García and Sebastián Prieto.

== Seeds ==
1. (Sweden) Simon Aspelin / (Austria) Julian Knowle (champions)
2. (Argentina) Martín García / (Argentina) Sebastián Prieto (final)
3. (Sweden) Robert Lindstedt / (Finland) Jarkko Nieminen (quarterfinals)
4. (Sweden) Jonas Björkman / (Sweden) Thomas Johansson (semifinals)

== Draw ==
=== Key ===
- Q = Qualifier
- WC = Wild card
- LL = Lucky loser
- Alt = Alternate
- SE = Special exempt
- PR = Protected ranking
- ITF = ITF entry
- JE = Junior exempt
- w/o = Walkover
- r = Retired
- d = Defaulted
- SR = Special ranking

=== Draw ===
First round
1	(Sweden) S Aspelin (Austria) J Knowle	6	6
(Belgium) O Rochus (France) G Simon	3	2
WC	(Sweden) J Brunström (Sweden) R Söderling	6	6
(Netherlands) B Beks (Netherlands) M van Haasteren	3	2
4	(Sweden) J Björkman (Sweden) T Johansson	6	6
WC	(Sweden) F Prpic (Sweden) M Ryderstedt	2	2
(Argentina) C Berlocq (Spain) I Navarro	6	7^{8}
Alt	(Sweden) J Adaktusson (Sweden) J Landsberg	2	6^{6}
(Spain) G García López (Spain) Ó Hernández	2	7^{7}	[12]
(Spain) N Almagro (Chile) N Massú	6	6^{5}	[10]
(Russia) Y Schukin (Serbia) V Troicki	3	6	[10]
3	(Sweden) R Lindstedt (Finland) J Nieminen	6	3	[12]
(Germany) T Behrend (Germany) C Kas	7^{10}	6
(Argentina) J Mónaco (Argentina) M Zabaleta	6^{8}	4
(India) M Ghouse (Germany) F Moser	1	1
2	(Argentina) M García (Argentina) S Prieto	6	6

Quarterfinals
1	(Sweden) S Aspelin (Austria) J Knowle	w/o
WC	(Sweden) J Brunström (Sweden) R Söderling
4	(Sweden) J Björkman (Sweden) T Johansson	6	6
(Argentina) C Berlocq (Spain) I Navarro	4	0
(Spain) G García López (Spain) Ó Hernández	6	3	[11]
3	(Sweden) R Lindstedt (Finland) J Nieminen	2	6	[9]
(Germany) T Behrend (Germany) C Kas	4	3
2	(Argentina) M García (Argentina) S Prieto	6	6

Semifinals
1	(Sweden) S Aspelin (Austria) J Knowle	2	6	[11]
4	(Sweden) J Björkman (Sweden) T Johansson	6	2	[9]
(Spain) G García López (Spain) Ó Hernández	6	3	r
2	(Argentina) M García (Argentina) S Prieto	4	6

Final
1	(Sweden) S Aspelin (Austria) J Knowle	6	6
2	(Argentina) M García (Argentina) S Prieto	2	4
