= 2002 Swedish Open – Singles =

Singles
- 2002 Swedish Open

Final
- Champion: (Spain) Carlos Moyá
- Runner-up: (Morocco) Younes El Aynaoui
- Score: 6–3, 2–6, 7–5

Details
- Draw: 32
- Seeds: 6

Events
Singles	Doubles
← 2001 ·	Swedish Open	· 2003 →

Andrea Gaudenzi was the defending champion but lost in the first round to Gorka Fraile.

Carlos Moyá won in the final 6–3, 2–6, 7–5 against Younes El Aynaoui.

== Seeds ==
A champion seed is indicated in bold text while text in italics indicates the round in which that seed was eliminated.

1. (Argentina) Guillermo Cañas (quarterfinals)
2. (Morocco) Younes El Aynaoui (final)
3. (Spain) **Carlos Moyá (champion)**
4. (Spain) Tommy Robredo (semifinals)
5. (Finland) Jarkko Nieminen (first round)
6. (Chile) Fernando González (second round)
7. (Argentina) Mariano Zabaleta (second round)
8. (Sweden) Jonas Björkman (first round)

== Draw ==
=== Key ===
- Q = Qualifier
- WC = Wild card
- LL = Lucky loser
- Alt = Alternate
- SE = Special exempt
- PR = Protected ranking
- ITF = ITF entry
- JE = Junior exempt
- w/o = Walkover
- r = Retired
- d = Defaulted
- SR = Special ranking

First round
1	(Argentina) **G Cañas**	**6**	**6**
(Sweden) A Vinciguerra	4	2
(Czech Republic) J Vacek	5	3
(Spain) **A Montañés**	**7**	**6**
(France) **N Coutelot**	3	**7**	**6**
Q	(Sweden) F Prpic	**6**	5	2
(Argentina) **A Calleri**	**6**	**6**
5	(Finland) J Nieminen	1	4
3	(Spain) **C Moyá**	**6**	**6**
(Belgium) O Rochus	3	4
(Georgia (country)) **I Labadze**	**6**	1	**6**
Q	(Romania) V Hănescu	4	**6**	3
(Belgium) C Rochus	**6**	3	2
(Russia) **N Davydenko**	3	**6**	**6**
WC	(Sweden) M Larsson	5	3
6	(Chile) **F González**	**7**	**6**
8	(Sweden) J Björkman	**6**	3	4
WC	(Sweden) **M Norman**	1	**6**	**6**
Q	(France) A di Pasquale	3	4
(Slovakia) **D Hrbatý**	**6**	**6**
Q	(Spain) **G Fraile**	**6**	**7^{7}**
(Italy) A Gaudenzi	4	6^{4}
(Denmark) K Pless	**7**	2	2
4	(Spain) **T Robredo**	5	**6**	**6**
7	(Argentina) **M Zabaleta**	**7^{7}**	**7^{10}**
WC	(Sweden) R Söderling	6^{3}	6^{8}
(Spain) **A Portas**	4	**6**	**6**
(Spain) F Vicente	**6**	4	4
(United States) V Spadea	3	1
(Czech Republic) **B Ulihrach**	**6**	**6**
(Germany) L Burgsmüller	3	**6**	5
2	(Morocco) **Y El Aynaoui**	**6**	4	**7**

Second round
1	(Argentina) **G Cañas**	**6**	**6**
(Spain) A Montañés	0	0
(France) N Coutelot	2	5
(Argentina) **A Calleri**	**6**	**7**
3	(Spain) **C Moyá**	**6**	**6**
(Georgia (country)) I Labadze	2	4
(Russia) **N Davydenko**	**6**	**6**
6	(Chile) F González	3	4
WC	(Sweden) **M Norman**	2	**6**	**6**
(Slovakia) D Hrbatý	**6**	4	2
Q	(Spain) G Fraile	4	**6**	4
4	(Spain) **T Robredo**	**6**	2	**6**
7	(Argentina) M Zabaleta	3	4
(Spain) **A Portas**	**6**	**6**
(Czech Republic) B Ulihrach	3	3
2	(Morocco) **Y El Aynaoui**	**6**	**6**

Quarterfinals
1	(Argentina) G Cañas	3	5
(Argentina) **A Calleri**	**6**	**7**
3	(Spain) **C Moyá**	**6**	**6**
(Russia) N Davydenko	3	2
WC	(Sweden) M Norman	**6**	3	3
4	(Spain) **T Robredo**	2	**6**	**6**
(Spain) A Portas	**6**	1	4
2	(Morocco) **Y El Aynaoui**	4	**6**	**6**

Semifinals
(Argentina) A Calleri	4	2
3	(Spain) **C Moyá**	**6**	**6**
4	(Spain) T Robredo	2	2
2	(Morocco) **Y El Aynaoui**	**6**	**6**

Final
3	(Spain) **Carlos Moyá**	**6**	2	**7**
2	(Morocco) Younes El Aynaoui	3	**6**	5
