= 2006 Swedish Open – Singles =

Singles
- 2006 Swedish Open

Final
- Champions: (Spain) Tommy Robredo
- Runners-up: (Russia) Nikolay Davydenko
- Score: 6–2, 6–1

Details
- Draw: 32
- Seeds: 8

Events
Singles	Doubles
← 2005 ·	Swedish Open	· 2007 →

Tommy Robredo defeated Nikolay Davydenko 6–2, 6–1 to win the 2006 Swedish Open singles event.

== Seeds ==
1. (Russia) Nikolay Davydenko (final)
2. (Spain) Tommy Robredo (champion)
3. (Czech Republic) Tomáš Berdych (first round)
4. (Finland) Jarkko Nieminen (semifinals)
5. (Spain) David Ferrer (second round)
6. (Sweden) Thomas Johansson (first round)
7. (Argentina) Guillermo Coria (first round)
8. (Spain) Juan Carlos Ferrero (quarterfinals)

== Draw ==
=== Key ===
- Q = Qualifier
- WC = Wild card
- LL = Lucky loser
- Alt = Alternate
- SE = Special exempt
- PR = Protected ranking
- ITF = ITF entry
- JE = Junior exempt
- w/o = Walkover
- r = Retired
- d = Defaulted
- SR = Special ranking

=== Finals ===
Semifinals
1	(Russia) Nikolay Davydenko	6	6
(Argentina) Agustín Calleri	3	3
4	(Finland) Jarkko Nieminen	6	2	4
2	(Spain) Tommy Robredo	3	6	6

Final
1	(Russia) Nikolay Davydenko	2	1
2	(Spain) Tommy Robredo	6	6

=== Section 1 ===
First round
1	(Russia) N Davydenko	6	6
(Spain) A Martin	4	1
(Czech Republic) I Minar	6	2	3
Q	(Kazakhstan) Y Schukin	2	6	6
(Chile) N Massu	6	3
(Argentina) M Zabaleta	4	1^{r}
(Argentina) J Acasuso	2	6	7
7	(Argentina) G Coria	6	2	5
3	(Czech Republic) T Berdych	2	6^{7}
(Spain) N Almagro	6	7^{9}
Q	(Australia) P Luczak	6	1	2
(Argentina) A Calleri	3	6	6
Q	(Serbia) B Pašanski	2	3
(Sweden) R Söderling	6	6
(Kuwait) M Ghareeb	4	4
5	(Spain) D Ferrer	6	6

Second round
1	(Russia) N Davydenko	6	3	6
Q	(Kazakhstan) Y Schukin	0	6	1
(Chile) N Massu	6	6
(Argentina) J Acasuso	4	2
(Spain) N Almagro	3	4
(Argentina) A Calleri	6	6
(Sweden) R Söderling	6	6
5	(Spain) D Ferrer	3	1

Quarterfinals
1	(Russia) N Davydenko	6	6
(Chile) N Massu	4	3
(Argentina) A Calleri	6	6
(Sweden) R Söderling	4	4

Semifinals
1	(Russia) N Davydenko	6	6
(Argentina) A Calleri	3	3

=== Section 2 ===
First round
8	(Spain) J Ferrero	6	3	6
WC	(Sweden) E Eleskovic	3	6	3
(Austria) O Marach	6	6^{2}	6
WC	(Sweden) F Prpic	3	7^{7}	2
WC	(Sweden) A Vinciguerra	3	2
(Czech Republic) L Dlouhý	6	6
(Argentina) J Chela	4	7	1
4	(Finland) J Nieminen	6	5	6
6	(Sweden) T Johansson	4	2
(Peru) L Horna	6	6
Q	(Russia) E Korolev	6	3	6
(France) F Serra	3	6	4
(Sweden) J Björkman	4	6	3
(Germany) A Waske	6	4	6
(France) G Simon	6	1	4
2	(Spain) T Robredo	4	6	6

Second round
8	(Spain) J Ferrero	6	6
(Austria) O Marach	2	3
(Czech Republic) L Dlouhý	7^{7}	0	3
4	(Finland) J Nieminen	6^{2}	6	6
(Peru) L Horna	2	3
Q	(Russia) E Korolev	6	6
(Germany) A Waske	3	1
2	(Spain) T Robredo	6	6

Quarterfinals
8	(Spain) J Ferrero	6^{5}	2
4	(Finland) J Nieminen	7^{7}	6
Q	(Russia) E Korolev	6	3	1
2	(Spain) T Robredo	4	6	6

Semifinals
4	(Finland) J Nieminen	6	2	4
2	(Spain) T Robredo	3	6	6
