= 2006 Swedish Open – Doubles =

Doubles
- 2006 Swedish Open

Final
- Champions: (Sweden) Jonas Björkman (Sweden) Thomas Johansson
- Runners-up: (Germany) Christopher Kas (Austria) Oliver Marach
- Score: 6–3, 4–6, [10–4]

Events
Singles	Doubles
← 2005 ·	Swedish Open	· 2007 →

Jonas Björkman and Joachim Johansson were the defending champions, but Johansson did not participate this year.

Björkman partnered with Thomas Johansson and won in the final 6–3, 4–6, [10–4], against Christopher Kas and Oliver Marach.

== Seeds ==
1. (Sweden) Simon Aspelin / (Australia) Todd Perry (quarterfinals)
2. (Sweden) Jonas Björkman / (Sweden) Thomas Johansson (champions)
3. (Argentina) Martín García / (Argentina) Sebastián Prieto (quarterfinals)
4. (Germany) Michael Kohlmann / (Germany) Alexander Waske (first round)

== Draw ==
=== Key ===
- Q = Qualifier
- WC = Wild card
- LL = Lucky loser
- Alt = Alternate
- SE = Special exempt
- PR = Protected ranking
- ITF = ITF entry
- JE = Junior exempt
- w/o = Walkover
- r = Retired
- d = Defaulted
- SR = Special ranking

=== Draw ===
First round
1	(Sweden) S Aspelin (Australia) T Perry	7^{7}	6
(Spain) N Almagro (Costa Rica) JA Marín	6^{4}	3
(France) F Serra (France) G Simon	6^{2}	0
(Argentina) L Arnold Ker (Russia) N Davydenko	7^{7}	6
3	(Argentina) M García (Argentina) S Prieto	6	7
(Sweden) R Lindstedt (Finland) J Nieminen	3	5
WC	(Sweden) E Eleskovic (Sweden) M Ryderstedt	5	6^{4}
(Germany) C Kas (Austria) O Marach	7	7^{7}
(Argentina) G Coria (Argentina) J Mónaco	5	6	[8]
(Argentina) J Acasuso (Argentina) JI Chela	7	4	[10]
(Peru) L Horna (Spain) A Martín	6	6^{5}	[10]
4	(Germany) M Kohlmann (Germany) A Waske	4	7^{7}	[8]
(Czech Republic) T Berdych (Czech Republic) J Levinský	6	7
(Chile) N Massú (Croatia) L Zovko	4	5
WC	(Sweden) A Järryd (Sweden) R Söderling	3	1
2	(Sweden) J Björkman (Sweden) T Johansson	6	6

Quarterfinals
1	(Sweden) S Aspelin (Australia) T Perry	4	3
(Argentina) L Arnold Ker (Russia) N Davydenko	6	6
3	(Argentina) M García (Argentina) S Prieto	3	3
(Germany) C Kas (Austria) O Marach	6	6
(Argentina) J Acasuso (Argentina) JI Chela	6	6
(Peru) L Horna (Spain) A Martín	3	2
(Czech Republic) T Berdych (Czech Republic) J Levinský	6^{5}	5
2	(Sweden) J Björkman (Sweden) T Johansson	7^{7}	7

Semifinals
(Argentina) L Arnold Ker (Russia) N Davydenko	3	6	[8]
(Germany) C Kas (Austria) O Marach	6	2	[10]
(Argentina) J Acasuso (Argentina) JI Chela	5	3
2	(Sweden) J Björkman (Sweden) T Johansson	7	6

Final
(Germany) C Kas (Austria) O Marach	3	6	[4]
2	(Sweden) J Björkman (Sweden) T Johansson	6	4	[10]
