= 2004 Swedish Open – Singles =

Singles
- 2004 Swedish Open

Final
- Champion: (Argentina) Mariano Zabaleta
- Runner-up: (Argentina) Gastón Gaudio
- Score: 6–1, 4–6, 7–6^{(7–4)}

Details
- Draw: 32
- Seeds: 8

Events
Singles	Doubles
← 2003 ·	Swedish Open	· 2005 →

Mariano Zabaleta was the defending champion, and defended his title defeating Gastón Gaudio 6–1, 4–6, 7–6^{(7–4)} in the final.

== Seeds ==
1. (Spain) Carlos Moyá (withdrew because of a shoulder injury)
2. (Argentina) Gastón Gaudio (final)
3. (Chile) Nicolás Massú (first round)
4. (Argentina) Juan Ignacio Chela (quarterfinals)
5. (Spain) Tommy Robredo (second round)
6. (Chile) Fernando González (semifinals)
7. (Sweden) Jonas Björkman (first round)
8. (Argentina) Mariano Zabaleta (champion)
9. (Russia) Mikhail Youzhny (first round)

== Draw ==
=== Key ===
- Q = Qualifier
- WC = Wild card
- LL = Lucky loser
- Alt = Alternate
- ITF = ITF entry
- PR = Protected ranking
- SR = Special ranking
- SE = Special exempt
- JE = Junior exempt
- JR = Junior Accelerator Programme entrant
- CO = College Accelerator Programme entrant
- NG = Next Gen Accelerator Program entrant
- w/o = Walkover
- r = Retired
- d = Defaulted

=== Finals ===
Semifinals
8	(Argentina) Mariano Zabaleta	6	6
6	(Chile) Fernando González	1	4
(Sweden) Robin Söderling	4	2
2	(Argentina) Gastón Gaudio	6	6

Final
8	(Argentina) Mariano Zabaleta	6	4	7^{7}
2	(Argentina) Gastón Gaudio	1	6	6^{4}

=== Top half ===
First round
9	(Russia) M Youzhny	5	3
(Spain) A Martín	7	6
(Italy) F Volandri	4	7^{7}	6
(Argentina) G Cañas	6	6^{1}	4
Q	(Sweden) M Hellström	6	0	0
(Georgia (country)) I Labadze	4	6	6
(Sweden) J Johansson	4	3
8	(Argentina) M Zabaleta	6	6
3	(Chile) N Massú	6	3	2
WC	(Argentina) J Mónaco	4	6	6
(Belgium) K Vliegen	6	6
(France) A Di Pasquale	4	2
(Finland) J Nieminen	6	6
WC	(Sweden) E Eleskovic	0	2
(Peru) L Horna	3	2
6	(Chile) F González	6	6

Second round
(Spain) A Martín	5	6	6
(Italy) F Volandri	7	1	4
(Georgia (country)) I Labadze	4	6	3
8	(Argentina) M Zabaleta	6	1	6
WC	(Argentina) J Mónaco	5	6	6
(Belgium) K Vliegen	7	4	1
(Finland) J Nieminen	6^{3}	1
6	(Chile) F González	7^{7}	6

Quarterfinals
(Spain) A Martín	1	2
8	(Argentina) M Zabaleta	6	6
WC	(Argentina) J Mónaco	4	4
6	(Chile) F González	6	6

Semifinals
8	(Argentina) M Zabaleta	6	6
6	(Chile) F González	1	4

=== Bottom half ===
First round
5	(Spain) T Robredo	4	7	6
(Argentina) A Calleri	6	5	4
Q	(Serbia and Montenegro) B Pašanski	6^{4}	2
(Sweden) R Söderling	7^{7}	6
(Spain) F Verdasco	6	6
WC	(Sweden) T Johansson	1	4
(Spain) M López	4	0
4	(Argentina) JI Chela	6	6
7	(Sweden) J Björkman	2	2
Q	(Spain) S Ventura	6	6
(Spain) R Nadal	4	6	6
LL	(Czech Republic) J Vaněk	6	4	3
(France) O Patience	6	4	7^{7}
Q	(Russia) T Gabashvili	3	6	6^{1}
(Russia) N Davydenko	3	1
2	(Argentina) G Gaudio	6	6

Second round
5	(Spain) T Robredo	0	6	3
(Sweden) R Söderling	6	4	6
(Spain) F Verdasco	4	5
4	(Argentina) JI Chela	6	7
Q	(Spain) S Ventura	1	2
(Spain) R Nadal	6	6
(France) O Patience	6	3	2
2	(Argentina) G Gaudio	4	6	6

Quarterfinals
(Sweden) R Söderling	6	6^{5}	6
4	(Argentina) JI Chela	3	7^{7}	2
(Spain) R Nadal	2	3
2	(Argentina) G Gaudio	6	6

Semifinals
(Sweden) R Söderling	4	2
2	(Argentina) G Gaudio	6	6
