= 2003 Synsam Swedish Open – Singles =

Singles
- 2003 Synsam Swedish Open

Final
- Champion: (Argentina) Mariano Zabaleta
- Runner-up: (Ecuador) Nicolás Lapentti
- Score: 6–3, 6–4

Details
- Draw: 32
- Seeds: 8

Events
| Singles | Doubles |
| ← 2002 · | Synsam Swedish Open | · 2004 → |

Carlos Moyá was the defending champion but lost in the semifinals to Mariano Zabaleta.

Zabaleta won in the final 6–3, 6–4 against Nicolás Lapentti.

== Seeds ==
A champion seed is indicated in bold text while text in italics indicates the round in which that seed was eliminated.

1. (Spain) Carlos Moyá (semifinals)
2. (Spain) Tommy Robredo (semifinals)
3. (Morocco) Younes El Aynaoui (first round)
4. (Russia) Mikhail Youzhny (quarterfinals)
5. (Argentina) **Mariano Zabaleta (champion)**
6. (Ecuador) Nicolás Lapentti (final)
7. (Spain) Fernando Vicente (first round)
8. (Spain) Alberto Martín (first round)

== Draw ==
=== Key ===
- Q = Qualifier
- WC = Wild card
- LL = Lucky loser
- Alt = Alternate
- SE = Special exempt
- PR = Protected ranking
- ITF = ITF entry
- JE = Junior exempt
- w/o = Walkover
- r = Retired
- d = Defaulted
- SR = Special ranking

First round
1 | (Spain) **C Moyá** | **6** | 6^{2} | **6**
(Slovakia) D Hrbatý | 2 | **7^{7}** | 3
WC | (Sweden) **R Söderling** | **7** | **6**
Q | (Austria) M Hipfl | 5 | 1
(Sweden) **J Björkman** | **7^{7}** | **6**
(Argentina) M Puerta | 6^{4} | 4
(Spain) **D Ferrer** | **6** | **6**
7 | (Spain) F Vicente | 4 | 3
4 | (Russia) **M Youzhny** | **7^{7}** | **7^{7}**
(Belgium) O Rochus | 6^{4} | 6^{1}
(Argentina) **F Squillari** | **6** | **6**
LL | (Slovakia) L Svarc | 4 | 3
Q | (Sweden) H Andersson | 3 | 1
WC | (Sweden) **B Rehnquist** | **6** | **6**
(Chile) N Massú | **6** | 3 | 3
5 | (Argentina) **M Zabaleta** | 2 | **6** | **6**
6 | (Ecuador) **N Lapentti** | **6** | **7**
(Peru) L Horna | 4 | 5
WC | (Sweden) F Prpic | 6^{2} | 2
(Romania) **A Voinea** | **7^{7}** | **6**
Q | (Netherlands) R Wassen | 4 | 4
(Spain) **A Portas** | **6** | **6**
(Spain) **R Nadal** | **6** | 4 | **6**
3 | (Morocco) Y El Aynaoui | 3 | **6** | 3
8 | (Spain) A Martín | 6^{3} | 3
(France) **O Mutis** | **7^{7}** | **6**
(Italy) **F Volandri** | **6** | **6**
LL | (Argentina) F Browne | 1 | 1
(Morocco) **H Arazi** | **7** | **6**
(Sweden) M Norman | 5 | 4
Q | (Sweden) M Sarstrand | 3 | 2
2 | (Spain) **T Robredo** | **6** | **6**

Second round
1 | (Spain) **C Moyá** | **6** | **6**
WC | (Sweden) R Söderling | 3 | 4
(Sweden) **J Björkman** | **6** | **6**
(Spain) D Ferrer | 2 | 1
4 | (Russia) **M Youzhny** | **6** | 5 | **6**
(Argentina) F Squillari | 1 | **7** | 2
WC | (Sweden) B Rehnquist | 1 | 2
5 | (Argentina) **M Zabaleta** | **6** | **6**
6 | (Ecuador) **N Lapentti** | **6** | **7^{7}**
(Romania) A Voinea | 4 | 6^{5}
(Spain) A Portas | 0 | 4
(Spain) **R Nadal** | **6** | **6**
(France) O Mutis | 3 | 0
(Italy) **F Volandri** | **6** | **6**
(Morocco) H Arazi | **6** | 2 | 4
2 | (Spain) **T Robredo** | 4 | **6** | **6**

Quarterfinals
1 | (Spain) **C Moyá** | **6** | **6**
(Sweden) J Björkman | 4 | 3
4 | (Russia) M Youzhny | **6** | 5 | 1
5 | (Argentina) **M Zabaleta** | 4 | **7** | **6**
6 | (Ecuador) **N Lapentti** | 3 | **6** | **7^{8}**
(Spain) R Nadal | **6** | 3 | 6^{6}
(Italy) F Volandri | 4 | 4
2 | (Spain) **T Robredo** | **6** | **6**

Semifinals
1 | (Spain) C Moyá | **6** | 3 | 4
5 | (Argentina) **M Zabaleta** | 2 | **6** | **6**
6 | (Ecuador) **N Lapentti** | **6** | **6**
2 | (Spain) T Robredo | 4 | 2

Final
5 | (Argentina) **Mariano Zabaleta** | **6** | **6**
6 | (Ecuador) Nicolás Lapentti | 3 | 4
