= 2005 Swedish Open =

- Date: 4–10 July
- Edition: 58th
- Category: International Series
- Draw: 32S / 16D
- Prize money: $380,000
- Surface: Clay / outdoor
- Location: Båstad, Sweden

Champions

Singles
- (Spain) Rafael Nadal

Doubles
- (Sweden) Jonas Björkman / (Sweden) Joachim Johansson
← 2004 ·	Swedish Open	· 2006 →

The 2005 Swedish Open, also known by its sponsored name Synsam Swedish Open, was a men's tennis event played on outdoor clay courts in Båstad, Sweden. It was the 58th edition of the Swedish Open tournament and was part of the International Series of the 2005 ATP Tour. The tournament was held from 10 July through 16 July 2005. First-seeded Rafael Nadal won the singles title.

== Finals ==
=== Singles ===
(Spain) Rafael Nadal defeated (Czech Republic) Tomáš Berdych, 2–6, 6–2, 6–4

=== Doubles ===
(Sweden) Jonas Björkman / (Sweden) Joachim Johansson defeated (Argentina) José Acasuso / (Argentina) Sebastián Prieto, 6–2, 6–3
