= 2008 Swedish Open – Doubles =

Doubles
- 2008 Swedish Open

Final
- Champions: (Sweden) Jonas Björkman (Sweden) Robin Söderling
- Runners-up: (Sweden) Johan Brunström (Netherlands Antilles) Jean-Julien Rojer
- Score: 6–2, 6–2

Details
- Draw: 16
- Seeds: 4

Events
Singles	Doubles
- Swedish Open

Simon Aspelin and Julian Knowle were the defending champions, but Knowle chose not to participate, and only Aspelin competed that year.
Aspelin partnered with Thomas Johansson, but lost in the semifinals to Jonas Björkman and Robin Söderling.

Jonas Björkman and Robin Söderling won in the final 6–2, 6–2, against Johan Brunström and Jean-Julien Rojer.

== Seeds ==
1. (Sweden) Robert Lindstedt / (Finland) Jarkko Nieminen (first round)
2. (Sweden) Simon Aspelin / (Sweden) Thomas Johansson (semifinals)
3. (Spain) Marcel Granollers / (Italy) Potito Starace (first round)
4. (Spain) Tommy Robredo / (Spain) Fernando Verdasco (quarterfinals)

== Draw ==
Key

- Q = Qualifier
- WC = Wild card
- LL = Lucky loser
- Alt = Alternate
- ITF = ITF entry
- PR = Protected ranking
- SR = Special ranking
- SE = Special exempt
- JE = Junior exempt
- JR = Junior Accelerator Programme entrant
- CO = College Accelerator Programme entrant
- NG = Next Gen Accelerator Program entrant
- w/o = Walkover
- r = Retired
- d = Defaulted

=== Draw ===
First round
1	(Sweden) R Lindstedt (Finland) J Nieminen	4	6	[5]
(Spain) D Ferrer (Spain) M López	6	3	[10]
ALT	(Sweden) C Bergman (Sweden) H Norfeldt	1	6	[10]
(Italy) A Motti (France) N Tourte	6	3	[7]
4	(Spain) T Robredo (Spain) F Verdasco	6	6
WC	(Sweden) F Prpic (Sweden) B Rehnquist	4	2
(Netherlands) J Smit (Netherlands Antilles) M van Haasteren	2	5
(Sweden) J Brunström (Netherlands Antilles) J-J Rojer	6	7
(Austria) D Köllerer (Germany) F Moser	6	6
(Czech Republic) T Berdych (Russia) M Safin	3	3
(Sweden) J Björkman (Sweden) R Söderling	7^{8}	3	[10]
3	(Spain) M Granollers (Italy) P Starace	6^{6}	6	[5]
(Italy) F Colangelo (Italy) F Fognini	4	3
(Chile) N Massú (Argentina) S Roitman	6	6
(Belgium) S Darcis (Belgium) O Rochus	6^{2}	5
2	(Sweden) S Aspelin (Sweden) T Johansson	7^{7}	7

Quarterfinals
(Spain) D Ferrer (Spain) M López	6	6
ALT	(Sweden) C Bergman (Sweden) H Norfeldt	3	0
4	(Spain) T Robredo (Spain) F Verdasco	2	1
(Sweden) J Brunström (Netherlands Antilles) J-J Rojer	6	6
(Austria) D Köllerer (Germany) F Moser	6^{4}	1
(Sweden) J Björkman (Sweden) R Söderling	7^{7}	6
(Chile) N Massú (Argentina) S Roitman	4	4
2	(Sweden) S Aspelin (Sweden) T Johansson	6	6

Semifinals
(Spain) D Ferrer (Spain) M López	3	4
(Sweden) J Brunström (Netherlands Antilles) J-J Rojer	6	6
(Sweden) J Björkman (Sweden) R Söderling	7^{7}	6
2	(Sweden) S Aspelin (Sweden) T Johansson	6^{5}	2

Final
(Sweden) J Brunström (Netherlands Antilles) J-J Rojer	2	2
(Sweden) J Björkman (Sweden) R Söderling	6	6
