= 2009 Swedish Open – Women's doubles =

Women's doubles
- 2009 Swedish Open

Final
- Champion: (Argentina) Gisela Dulko (Italy) Flavia Pennetta
- Runner-up: (Spain) Nuria Llagostera Vives (Spain) María José Martínez Sánchez
- Score: 6–2, 0–6, 10–5

Details
- Draw: 16
- Seeds: 4

Events
Singles	men	women
Doubles	men	women
- Swedish Open

Gisela Dulko and Flavia Pennetta won in the final 6–2, 0–6, 10–5, against Nuria Llagostera Vives and María José Martínez Sánchez.

== Seeds ==
1. (Spain) Nuria Llagostera Vives / (Spain) María José Martínez Sánchez (final)
2. (Argentina) Gisela Dulko / (Italy) Flavia Pennetta (champions)
3. (United States) Jill Craybas / (Russia) Alla Kudryavtseva (first round)
4. (Romania) Sorana Cîrstea / (Denmark) Caroline Wozniacki (quarterfinals)

== Draw ==
Key

- Q = Qualifier
- WC = Wild card
- LL = Lucky loser
- Alt = Alternate
- ITF = ITF entry
- PR = Protected ranking
- SR = Special ranking
- SE = Special exempt
- JE = Junior exempt
- JR = Junior Accelerator Programme entrant
- CO = College Accelerator Programme entrant
- NG = Next Gen Accelerator Program entrant
- w/o = Walkover
- r = Retired
- d = Defaulted

=== Brackets ===
First round
1	(Spain) N Llagostera Vives (Spain) MJ Martínez Sánchez	6	6
(Finland) E Laine (Poland) U Radwańska	3	4
(Sweden) S Arvidsson (Slovakia) D Cibulková	2	1
(Italy) F Schiavone (Spain) C Suárez Navarro	6	6
4	(Romania) S Cîrstea (Denmark) C Wozniacki	7	7
(United States) L Osterloh (Kyrgyzstan) K Palkina	6^{6}	6^{6}
(Argentina) E Krauth (Sweden) H Nooni	2	6^{4}
(Russia) M Kondratieva (France) S Lefèvre	6	7
WC	(Sweden) M Johansson (Sweden) S Roma	4	2
(Poland) M Domachowska (South Africa) N Grandin	6	6
(Denmark) H Skak Jensen (Sweden) J Larsson	3	7	[10]
3	(United States) J Craybas (Russia) A Kudryavtseva	6	6^{7}	[5]
(Poland) O Brózda (Poland) M Kiszczyńska	6	7
(France) Y Fedossova (Serbia) T Mirčić	2	5
(Canada) H El Tabakh (Austria) M Klaffner	0	4
2	(Argentina) G Dulko (Italy) F Pennetta	6	6

Quarterfinals
1	(Spain) N Llagostera Vives (Spain) MJ Martínez Sánchez	7	6
(Italy) F Schiavone (Spain) C Suárez Navarro	6^{3}	2
4	(Romania) S Cîrstea (Denmark) C Wozniacki	6	4	[8]
(Russia) M Kondratieva (France) S Lefèvre	4	6	[10]
(Poland) M Domachowska (South Africa) N Grandin	6	7
(Denmark) H Skak Jensen (Sweden) J Larsson	0	5
(Poland) O Brózda (Poland) M Kiszczyńska	4	1
2	(Argentina) G Dulko (Italy) F Pennetta	6	6

Semifinals
1	(Spain) N Llagostera Vives (Spain) MJ Martínez Sánchez	6	6
(Russia) M Kondratieva (France) S Lefèvre	4	2
(Poland) M Domachowska (South Africa) N Grandin	2	4
2	(Argentina) G Dulko (Italy) F Pennetta	6	6

Final
1	(Spain) N Llagostera Vives (Spain) MJ Martínez Sánchez	2	6	[5]
2	(Argentina) G Dulko (Italy) F Pennetta	6	0	[10]
