= 2007 Swedish Open =

- Date: 9–15 July
- Edition: 60th
- Draw: 32S / 16D
- Prize money: $391,000
- Location: Båstad, Sweden
- Venue: Båstad Tennis Stadium

Champions

Singles
- (Spain) David Ferrer

Doubles
- (Sweden) Simon Aspelin / (Austria) Julian Knowle
| ← 2006 · | Swedish Open | · 2008 → |

The 2007 Swedish Open was the 2007 edition of the Swedish Open tennis tournament. The tournament was held from 9 July through 15 July 2007 and played on outdoor clay courts at the Båstad Tennis Stadium in Båstad, Sweden.

Second-seeded David Ferrer won the singles title, his second title of the year.

== Finals ==
=== Singles ===
(Spain) David Ferrer defeated (Spain) Nicolás Almagro, 6–1, 6–2

=== Doubles ===
(Sweden) Simon Aspelin / (Austria) Julian Knowle defeated (Argentina) Martín García / (Argentina) Sebastián Prieto, 6–2, 6–4
