= 2007 Swedish Open – Singles =

Singles
- 2007 Swedish Open

Final
- Champions: (Spain) David Ferrer
- Runners-up: (Spain) Nicolás Almagro
- Score: 6–1, 6–2

Details
- Draw: 32
- Seeds: 8

Events
Singles	Doubles
← 2006 ·	Swedish Open	· 2008 →

David Ferrer defeated Nicolás Almagro 6–1, 6–2 to win the 2007 Swedish Open singles event.

== Seeds ==
1. (Spain) Tommy Robredo (first round)
2. (Spain) David Ferrer (champion)
3. (Finland) Jarkko Nieminen (first round)
4. (Spain) Carlos Moyá (semifinals)
5. (Italy) Filippo Volandri (semifinals)
6. (Sweden) Robin Söderling (quarterfinals)
7. (Argentina) Juan Mónaco (second round)
8. (Sweden) Jonas Björkman (second round)

== Draw ==
=== Key ===
- Q = Qualifier
- WC = Wild card
- LL = Lucky loser
- Alt = Alternate
- SE = Special exempt
- PR = Protected ranking
- ITF = ITF entry
- JE = Junior exempt
- w/o = Walkover
- r = Retired
- d = Defaulted
- SR = Special ranking

=== Finals ===
Semifinals
(Spain) Nicolás Almagro	6	1	6
4	(Spain) Carlos Moyá	3	6	2
5	(Italy) Filippo Volandri	2	1
2	(Spain) David Ferrer	6	6

Final
(Spain) Nicolás Almagro	1	2
2	(Spain) David Ferrer	6	6

=== Section 1 ===
First round
1	(Spain) T Robredo	1	6	1
(Peru) L Horna	6	1	6
(Argentina) C Berlocq	6	6
WC	(Sweden) T Göransson	2	0
WC	(Sweden) F Prpic	1	6	1
(Spain) N Almagro	6	3	6
Q	(Poland) M Przysiężny	7	2	4
8	(Sweden) J Björkman	5	6	6
4	(Spain) C Moyá	6	6
(Spain) I Navarro	2	4
(Spain) Ó Hernández	4	4
(Sweden) T Johansson	6	6
Q	(Norway) E Tveit	5	1
(Spain) F Verdasco	7	6
(Italy) S Bolelli	3	3
6	(Sweden) R Söderling	6	6

Second round
(Peru) L Horna	6	7^{7}
(Argentina) C Berlocq	3	6^{5}
(Spain) N Almagro	6	6
8	(Sweden) J Björkman	4	2
4	(Spain) C Moyá	6	6
(Sweden) T Johansson	2	3
(Spain) F Verdasco	3	7	6^{4}
6	(Sweden) R Söderling	6	5	7^{7}

Quarterfinals
(Peru) L Horna	5	4
(Spain) N Almagro	7	6
4	(Spain) C Moyá	6	6
6	(Sweden) R Söderling	2	4

Semifinals
(Spain) N Almagro	6	1	6
4	(Spain) C Moyá	3	6	2

=== Section 2 ===
First round
5	(Italy) F Volandri	4	7	6
(Italy) F Luzzi	6	5	1
Q	(Russia) Y Schukin	6	1	7
(Argentina) M Zabaleta	1	6	5
(Czech Republic) L Dlouhý	6	6
WC	(Sweden) M Ryderstedt	1	4
(Belgium) O Rochus	6	6
3	(Finland) J Nieminen	4	2
7	(Argentina) J Mónaco	7^{8}	3	6
(Latvia) E Gulbis	6^{6}	6	4
Q	(Serbia) V Troicki	2	3
(France) G Simon	6	6
(Chile) N Massú	4	6	6
(Russia) E Korolev	6	3	4
(Spain) G García López	2	1
2	(Spain) D Ferrer	6	6

Second round
5	(Italy) F Volandri	4	6	6
Q	(Russia) Y Schukin	6	3	3
(Czech Republic) L Dlouhý	4	5
(Belgium) O Rochus	6	7
7	(Argentina) J Mónaco	4	4
(France) G Simon	6	6
(Chile) N Massú	3	6	3
2	(Spain) D Ferrer	6	3	6

Quarterfinals
5	(Italy) F Volandri	6	6
(Belgium) O Rochus	1	2
(France) G Simon	1	0
2	(Spain) D Ferrer	6	6

Semifinals
5	(Italy) F Volandri	2	1
2	(Spain) D Ferrer	6	6
