= Henrik Norfeldt =

Swedish tennis player

- Country (sports): Sweden
- Born: 23 December 1986 (age 38); Gothenburg, Sweden
- Height: 1.80 m (5 ft 11 in)
- Plays: Right-handed (two-handed backhand)
- Prize money: $18,097

Singles
- Career record: 0–0 (at ATP Tour level, Grand Slam level, and in Davis Cup)
- Career titles: 0
- Highest ranking: No. 723 (15 September 2008)

Doubles
- Career record: 1–1 (at ATP Tour level, Grand Slam level, and in Davis Cup)
- Career titles: 0; 2 ITF
- Highest ranking: No. 518 (14 July 2008)
- Last updated on: 20 February 2017.

Henrik Oskar Ingvar Norfeldt (born 23 December 1986) is a retired Swedish tennis player.

== Career ==
Norfeldt has a career high ATP singles ranking of 723 achieved on 15 September 2008. He also has a career high ATP doubles ranking of 518 achieved on 14 July 2008.

Norfeldt made his ATP main draw debut at the 2008 Swedish Open in the doubles draw partnering Carl Bergman. The pair won their first round match, but lost in the second round to David Ferrer and Marc Lopez.

Norfeldt competed primarily on the Futures Circuit, winning titles in doubles.

== ITF Futures titles ==
=== Doubles: (2) ===
No.	Date	Tournament	Surface	Partner	Opponents	Score
1.	Oct 2007	Germany F19, Leimen	Hard	(Sweden) David Nylen	(Germany) Ralph Grambow (Germany) Stefan Seifert	6–7 ^{(5–7)}, 6–3, [10–7]
2.	Mar 2008	Switzerland F2, Bassersdorf	Carpet	(Sweden) Carl Bergman	(Switzerland) Alexander Sadecky (Switzerland) Jean-Claude Scherrer	6–2, 4–6, [10–4]
