= 2001 Telenordia Swedish Open =

- Date: 9–15 July
- Edition: 54th
- Category: International Series
- Draw: 32S / 16D
- Prize money: $375,000
- Surface: Clay / outdoor
- Location: Båstad, Sweden

Champions

Singles
- (Italy) Andrea Gaudenzi

Doubles
- (Germany) Karsten Braasch / (Germany) Jens Knippschild
← 2000 ·	Swedish Open	· 2002 →

The 2001 Telenordia Swedish Open was a men's tennis tournament played on outdoor clay courts in Båstad in Sweden and was part of the International Series of the 2001 ATP Tour. It was the 54th edition of the tournament and ran from 9 July until 15 July 2001. Andrea Gaudenzi won the singles title.

== Finals ==
=== Singles ===
(Italy) Andrea Gaudenzi defeated (Czech Republic) Bohdan Ulihrach 7–5, 6–3

- It was Gaudenzi's 2nd title of the year and the 5th of his career.

=== Doubles ===
(Germany) Karsten Braasch / (Germany) Jens Knippschild defeated (Sweden) Simon Aspelin / (Australia) Andrew Kratzmann 7–6^{(7–3)}, 4–6, 7–6^{(7–5)}

- It was Braasch's 1st title of the year and the 2nd of his career. It was Knippschild's only title of the year and the 1st of his career.
