= 2005 Swedish Open – Doubles =

Tennis tournament

Doubles
- 2005 Swedish Open

Final
- Champions: (Sweden) Jonas Björkman (Sweden) Joachim Johansson
- Runners-up: (Argentina) José Acasuso (Argentina) Sebastián Prieto
- Score: 6–2, 6–3

Events
| Singles | Doubles |
| ← 2004 · | Swedish Open | · 2006 → |

Mahesh Bhupathi and Jonas Björkman were the defending champions. Bhupathi did not participate this year. Björkman partnered Joachim Johansson.

Björkman and Johansson won in the final 6–2, 6–3, against José Acasuso and Sebastián Prieto.

== Seeds ==
1. (Sweden) Simon Aspelin / (Australia) Todd Perry (semifinals)
2. (Argentina) Mariano Hood / (Spain) Tommy Robredo (first round)
3. (Argentina) José Acasuso / (Argentina) Sebastián Prieto (final)
4. (Austria) Julian Knowle / (Spain) Alberto Martín (quarterfinals)

== Draw ==
=== Key ===
- Q = Qualifier
- WC = Wild card
- LL = Lucky loser
- Alt = Alternate
- SE = Special exempt
- PR = Protected ranking
- ITF = ITF entry
- JE = Junior exempt
- w/o = Walkover
- r = Retired
- d = Defaulted
- SR = Special ranking

=== Draw ===
First round
1 | (Sweden) S Aspelin (Australia) T Perry | 6 | 6
(Spain) Ó Hernández (Czech Republic) J Vaněk | 3 | 4
(Czech Republic) T Berdych (Czech Republic) J Levinský | 7 | 6
(Poland) M Fyrstenberg (Poland) M Matkowski | 5 | 4
4 | (Austria) J Knowle (Spain) A Martín | 6 | 6
(United States) K Kim (Ecuador) N Lapentti | 2 | 2
WC | (Argentina) G Marcaccio (Argentina) M Zabaleta | 1 | 1
(Sweden) J Björkman (Sweden) J Johansson | 6 | 6
(Netherlands) R Sluiter (Netherlands) R Wassen | 6 | 6
WC | (Sweden) F Prpic (Sweden) A Vinciguerra | 2 | 2
(Czech Republic) L Dlouhý (Czech Republic) D Škoch | 4 | 3
3 | (Argentina) J Acasuso (Argentina) S Prieto | 6 | 6
(Argentina) J Mónaco (Spain) R Nadal | 6 | 6
(Sweden) R Lindstedt (Germany) F Mayer | 4 | 4
(Finland) J Nieminen (Sweden) R Söderling | 7 | 5 | 6
2 | (Argentina) M Hood (Spain) T Robredo | 5 | 7 | 3

Quarterfinals
1 | (Sweden) S Aspelin (Australia) T Perry | 6 | 7^{7}
(Czech Republic) T Berdych (Czech Republic) J Levinský | 3 | 6^{4}
4 | (Austria) J Knowle (Spain) A Martín | 5 | 3
(Sweden) J Björkman (Sweden) J Johansson | 7 | 6
(Netherlands) R Sluiter (Netherlands) R Wassen | 6 | 4 | 3
3 | (Argentina) J Acasuso (Argentina) S Prieto | 1 | 6 | 6
(Argentina) J Mónaco (Spain) R Nadal | 6 | 6
(Finland) J Nieminen (Sweden) R Söderling | 3 | 1

Semifinals
1 | (Sweden) S Aspelin (Australia) T Perry | 6^{4} | 6^{4}
(Sweden) J Björkman (Sweden) J Johansson | 7^{7} | 7^{7}
3 | (Argentina) J Acasuso (Argentina) S Prieto | 4 | 6 | 6
(Argentina) J Mónaco (Spain) R Nadal | 6 | 3 | 2

Final
(Sweden) J Björkman (Sweden) J Johansson | 6 | 6
3 | (Argentina) J Acasuso (Argentina) S Prieto | 2 | 3
