= 2003 Synsam Swedish Open – Doubles =

Doubles
- 2003 Synsam Swedish Open

Final
- Champions: (Sweden) Simon Aspelin (Italy) Massimo Bertolini
- Runners-up: (Argentina) Lucas Arnold (Argentina) Mariano Hood
- Score: 6–7^{(3–7)}, 6–0, 6–4

Events
Singles	Doubles
← 2002 ·	Synsam Swedish Open	· 2004 →

Jonas Björkman and Todd Woodbridge were the defending champions but only Björkman competed that year with Jared Palmer.

Björkman and Palmer lost in the semifinals to Simon Aspelin and Massimo Bertolini.

Aspelin and Bertolini won in the final 6–7^{(3–7)}, 6–0, 6–4 against Lucas Arnold and Mariano Hood.

== Seeds ==
1. (Sweden) Jonas Björkman / (United States) Jared Palmer (semifinals)
2. (Argentina) Lucas Arnold / (Argentina) Mariano Hood (final)
3. (Sweden) Simon Aspelin / (Italy) Massimo Bertolini (champions)
4. (United States) Devin Bowen / (Australia) Ashley Fisher (first round)

== Draw ==
=== Key ===
- Q = Qualifier
- WC = Wild card
- LL = Lucky loser
- Alt = Alternate
- SE = Special exempt
- PR = Protected ranking
- ITF = ITF entry
- JE = Junior exempt
- w/o = Walkover
- r = Retired
- d = Defaulted
- SR = Special ranking

First round
1	(Sweden) J Björkman (United States) J Palmer	7^{8}	6
WC	(Sweden) F Prpic (Sweden) R Söderling	6^{6}	1
(Morocco) H Arazi (Belgium) O Rochus	6	1	6
(South Africa) D Adams (Ecuador) N Lapentti	3	6	4
3	(Sweden) S Aspelin (Italy) M Bertolini	6	6
(Romania) A Voinea (Russia) M Youzhny	4	3
(Morocco) Y El Aynaoui (Belgium) T Vanhoudt	6
(Argentina) A Schneiter (Argentina) M Zabaleta	5^{r}
(Spain) D Ferrer (Spain) F Vicente	1	2
(Slovakia) D Hrbatý (Spain) A Martín	6	6
(Czech Republic) J Levinský (Spain) Á López Morón	6	6
4	(United States) D Bowen (Australia) A Fisher	3	3
(Spain) C Moyá (Spain) R Nadal	6	6
WC	(Sweden) J Landsberg (Sweden) M Norman	3	2
(Spain) A Portas (Spain) T Robredo	6	3	3
2	(Argentina) L Arnold (Argentina) M Hood	2	6	6

Quarterfinals
1	(Sweden) J Björkman (United States) J Palmer	w/o
(Morocco) H Arazi (Belgium) O Rochus
3	(Sweden) S Aspelin (Italy) M Bertolini	6	6
(Morocco) Y El Aynaoui (Belgium) T Vanhoudt	4	3
(Slovakia) D Hrbatý (Spain) A Martín	6	6
(Czech Republic) J Levinský (Spain) Á López Morón	4	4
(Spain) C Moyá (Spain) R Nadal	3	4
2	(Argentina) L Arnold (Argentina) M Hood	6	6

Semifinals
1	(Sweden) J Björkman (United States) J Palmer	4	6	3
3	(Sweden) S Aspelin (Italy) M Bertolini	6	3	6
(Slovakia) D Hrbatý (Spain) A Martín	1	4
2	(Argentina) L Arnold (Argentina) M Hood	6	6

Final
3	(Sweden) S Aspelin (Italy) M Bertolini	6^{3}	6	6
2	(Argentina) L Arnold (Argentina) M Hood	7^{7}	0	4
