= 2004 Swedish Open =

- Date: 5–11 July
- Edition: 57th
- Category: International Series
- Draw: 32S / 16D
- Prize money: $355,000
- Surface: Clay / outdoor
- Location: Båstad
- Venue: Båstad tennisstadion

Champions

Singles
- (Argentina) Mariano Zabaleta

Doubles
- (India) Mahesh Bhupathi / (Sweden) Jonas Björkman
← 2003 ·	Swedish Open	· 2005 →

The 2004 Swedish Open was a men's tennis tournament played on outdoor clay courts. It was the 57th edition of the Swedish Open, and was part of the International Series of the 2004 ATP Tour. It took place at the Båstad tennisstadion in Båstad, Sweden, from 5 July through 11 July 2004. Eighth-seeded Mariano Zabaleta won the singles title.

== Finals ==
=== Singles ===
(Argentina) Mariano Zabaleta defeated (Argentina) Gastón Gaudio, 6–1, 4–6, 7–6^{(7–4)}

- It was Zabaleta's 1st title of the year, and his 3rd overall. It was his 2nd win at the event.

=== Doubles ===
(India) Mahesh Bhupathi / (Sweden) Jonas Björkman defeated (Sweden) Simon Aspelin / (Australia) Todd Perry, 4–6, 7–6^{(7–2)}, 7–6^{(8–6)}

- It was Bhupathi's 4th title of the year, and his 35th overall. It was Björkman's 3rd title of the year, and his 36th overall.
