= 2005 Swedish Open – Singles =

Singles
- 2005 Swedish Open

Final
- Champion: (Spain) Rafael Nadal
- Runner-up: (Czech Republic) Tomáš Berdych
- Score: 2–6, 6–2, 6–4

Details
- Draw: 32
- Seeds: 8

Events
Singles	Doubles
← 2004 ·	Swedish Open	· 2006 →

Rafael Nadal defeated Tomáš Berdych in the final, 2–6, 6–2, 6–4 to win the singles tennis title at the 2005 Swedish Open.

Mariano Zabaleta was the defending champion, but lost in the quarterfinals to Berdych.

== Seeds ==
1. (Spain) Rafael Nadal (champion)
2. (Sweden) Joachim Johansson (first round)
3. (Spain) Tommy Robredo (semifinals)
4. (Spain) Carlos Moyá (second round)
5. (Spain) Juan Carlos Ferrero (quarterfinals)
6. (Russia) Mikhail Youzhny (quarterfinals)
7. (Sweden) Robin Söderling (second round)
8. (Argentina) José Acasuso (first round)

== Draw ==
=== Key ===
- Q = Qualifier
- WC = Wild card
- LL = Lucky loser
- Alt = Alternate
- ITF = ITF entry
- PR = Protected ranking
- SR = Special ranking
- SE = Special exempt
- JE = Junior exempt
- JR = Junior Accelerator Programme entrant
- CO = College Accelerator Programme entrant
- NG = Next Gen Accelerator Program entrant
- w/o = Walkover
- r = Retired
- d = Defaulted

=== Finals ===
Semifinals
1	(Spain) Rafael Nadal	6	6
3	(Spain) Tommy Robredo	3	3
(Czech Republic) Tomáš Berdych	7	6
(Czech Republic) Jiří Vaněk	5	1

Final
1	(Spain) Rafael Nadal	2	6	6
(Czech Republic) Tomáš Berdych	6	2	4

=== Top half ===
First round
1	(Spain) R Nadal	6	6
(Argentina) J Mónaco	1	1
Q	(Argentina) A Calleri	1	1
(Spain) A Martín	6	6
(Spain) G García-López	7	6
WC	(Ecuador) N Lapentti	5	1
Q	(Czech Republic) L Dlouhý	4	1
5	(Spain) JC Ferrero	6	6
3	(Spain) T Robredo	7	6
(Czech Republic) M Tabara	5	0
(Sweden) J Björkman	2	2
(France) G Monfils	6	6
WC	(Sweden) A Vinciguerra	6	6
WC	(Sweden) M Ryderstedt	3	1
(France) J Haehnel	1	1
6	(Russia) M Youzhny	6	6

Second round
1	(Spain) R Nadal	6	6
(Spain) A Martín	2	4
(Spain) G García-López	3	4
5	(Spain) JC Ferrero	6	6
3	(Spain) T Robredo	6	4
(France) G Monfils	4	2^{r}
WC	(Sweden) A Vinciguerra	6	6^{4}	5
6	(Russia) M Youzhny	4	7^{7}	7

Quarterfinals
1	(Spain) R Nadal	6	6
5	(Spain) JC Ferrero	3	3
3	(Spain) T Robredo	3	6	6
6	(Russia) M Youzhny	6	4	3

Semifinals
1	(Spain) R Nadal	6	6
3	(Spain) T Robredo	3	3

=== Bottom half ===
First round
8	(Argentina) J Acasuso	4	1
(Spain) N Almagro	6	6
(Czech Republic) T Berdych	6	6
(United States) K Kim	2	3
(Netherlands) R Sluiter	6	1	4
(Argentina) M Zabaleta	2	6	6
(Spain) Á Calatrava	5	2
4	(Spain) C Moyá	7	6
7	(Sweden) R Söderling	6	6
(Germany) F Mayer	2	4
(Spain) Ó Hernández	3	6	6
Q	(Spain) G Fraile	6	2	2
(Finland) J Nieminen	5	1
Q	(France) F Serra	7	6
(Czech Republic) J Vaněk	6^{2}	7^{7}	6
2	(Sweden) J Johansson	7^{7}	6^{2}	2

Second round
(Spain) N Almagro	6	3	4
(Czech Republic) T Berdych	4	6	6
(Argentina) M Zabaleta	7^{7}	6
4	(Spain) C Moyá	6^{3}	2
7	(Sweden) R Söderling	6	3	2
(Spain) Ó Hernández	1	6	6
Q	(France) F Serra	4	6	3
(Czech Republic) J Vaněk	6	1	6

Quarterfinals
(Czech Republic) T Berdych	6	6
(Argentina) M Zabaleta	3	2
(Spain) Ó Hernández	4	2
(Czech Republic) J Vaněk	6	6

Semifinals
(Czech Republic) T Berdych	7	6
(Czech Republic) J Vaněk	5	1
