= 2003 Synsam Swedish Open =

Men's tennis tournament

- Date: 7–13 July
- Edition: 56th
- Category: International Series
- Draw: 32S / 16D
- Prize money: $355,000
- Surface: Clay / outdoor
- Location: Båstad, Sweden

Champions

Singles
- (Argentina) Mariano Zabaleta

Doubles
- (Sweden) Simon Aspelin / (Italy) Massimo Bertolini
← 2002 ·	Swedish Open	· 2004 →

The 2003 Synsam Swedish Open was a men's tennis tournament played on outdoor clay courts in Båstad, Sweden and was part of the International Series of the 2003 ATP Tour. It was the 56th edition of the tournament and ran from 7 July until 13 July 2003. Fifth-seeded Mariano Zabaleta won the singles title.

== Finals ==
=== Singles ===
(Argentina) Mariano Zabaleta defeated (Ecuador) Nicolás Lapentti 6–3, 6–4

- It was Zabaleta's only title of the year and the 2nd of his career.

=== Doubles ===
(Sweden) Simon Aspelin / (Italy) Massimo Bertolini defeated (Argentina) Lucas Arnold / (Argentina) Mariano Hood 6–7^{(3–7)}, 6–0, 6–4

- It was Aspelin's 2nd title of the year and the 3rd of his career. It was Bertolini's only title of the year and the 2nd of his career.
