= 2009 Swedish Open – Women's singles =

Women's singles
- 2009 Swedish Open

Final
- Champion: (Spain) María José Martínez Sánchez
- Runner-up: (Denmark) Caroline Wozniacki
- Score: 7–5, 6–4

Details
- Draw: 32
- Seeds: 8

Events
Singles	men	women
Doubles	men	women
- Swedish Open

The 2009 Collector Swedish Open was a tennis tournament held in Båstad, Sweden. It was the 1st edition of the Collector Swedish Open. The women's singles event was played from 6 July until 11 July 2009. The winner was unseeded María José Martínez Sánchez, who defeated Caroline Wozniacki in the final by 7–5, 6–4. Participants and match results are listed below.

== Seeds ==
1. (Denmark) Caroline Wozniacki (final)
2. (Slovakia) Dominika Cibulková (quarterfinals)
3. (Italy) Flavia Pennetta (semifinals)
4. (Estonia) Kaia Kanepi (first round)
5. (Romania) Sorana Cîrstea (second round)
6. (Russia) Anastasia Pavlyuchenkova (second round)
7. (Spain) Carla Suárez Navarro (quarterfinals)
8. (Czech Republic) Iveta Benešová (second round)

== Draw ==
Key

- Q = Qualifier
- WC = Wild card
- LL = Lucky loser
- Alt = Alternate
- ITF = ITF entry
- PR = Protected ranking
- SR = Special ranking
- SE = Special exempt
- JE = Junior exempt
- JR = Junior Accelerator Programme entrant
- CO = College Accelerator Programme entrant
- NG = Next Gen Accelerator Program entrant
- w/o = Walkover
- r = Retired
- d = Defaulted

=== Finals ===
Semifinals
1	(Denmark) Caroline Wozniacki	6	4	6
3	(Italy) Flavia Pennetta	3	6	2
(Spain) María José Martínez Sánchez	7	6
(Argentina) Gisela Dulko	5	4

Final
1	(Denmark) Caroline Wozniacki	5	4
(Spain) María José Martínez Sánchez	7	6

=== Top half ===
First round
1	(Denmark) C Wozniacki	6	6
(Sweden) S Arvidsson	1	3
(Czech Republic) P Kvitová	6	4
Q	(Ukraine) J Vakulenko	3	1	r
Q	(Ukraine) I Buryachok	0	4
(Russia) M Kirilenko	6	6
(United States) J Craybas	6	3	3
6	(Russia) A Pavlyuchenkova	3	6	6
3	(Italy) F Pennetta	6	7
(Italy) F Schiavone	2	5
(Slovenia) M Zec Peškirič	6	6
Q	(Sweden) M Johansson	2	0
(Italy) K Knapp	1	1
(Russia) A Kudryavtseva	6	6
(Poland) U Radwańska	6	2	2
8	(Czech Republic) I Benešová	3	6	6

Second round
1	(Denmark) C Wozniacki	6	6
(Czech Republic) P Kvitová	4	2
(Russia) M Kirilenko	6	6
6	(Russia) A Pavlyuchenkova	2	3
3	(Italy) F Pennetta	6	6
(Slovenia) M Zec Peškirič	1	2
(Russia) A Kudryavtseva	6	6
8	(Czech Republic) I Benešová	2	4

Quarterfinals
1	(Denmark) C Wozniacki	7	7
(Russia) M Kirilenko	5	6^{4}
3	(Italy) F Pennetta	6	6
(Russia) A Kudryavtseva	4	2

Semifinals
1	(Denmark) C Wozniacki	6	4	6
3	(Italy) F Pennetta	3	6	2

=== Bottom half ===
First round
7	(Spain) C Suárez Navarro	6	7
(Slovakia) L Wienerová	0	5
Q	(Kyrgyzstan) K Palkina	4	4
WC	(Sweden) E Allgurin	6	6
(Czech Republic) B Záhlavová-Strýcová	5	4
(Germany) A Kerber	7	6
(Spain) MJ Martínez Sánchez	6	7
4	(Estonia) K Kanepi	1	6^{1}
5	(Romania) S Cîrstea	4	6	7
WC	(Sweden) J Larsson	6	2	5
(Argentina) G Dulko	6	6
(Poland) M Domachowska	4	0
(Spain) N Llagostera Vives	4	6	6
(Japan) A Morita	6	0	2
WC	(Sweden) S Roma	3	6	1
2	(Slovakia) D Cibulková	6	2	6

Second round
7	(Spain) C Suárez Navarro	6	6
WC	(Sweden) E Allgurin	1	4
(Germany) A Kerber	3	2
(Spain) MJ Martínez Sánchez	6	6
5	(Romania) S Cîrstea	3	6	6^{5}
(Argentina) G Dulko	6	4	7
(Spain) N Llagostera Vives	1	1
2	(Slovakia) D Cibulková	6	6

Quarterfinals
7	(Spain) C Suárez Navarro	6	3	0
(Spain) MJ Martínez Sánchez	4	6	6
(Argentina) G Dulko	6^{5}	6	7
2	(Slovakia) D Cibulková	7	3	6^{6}

Semifinals
(Spain) MJ Martínez Sánchez	7	6
(Argentina) G Dulko	5	4
