= 2001 Telenordia Swedish Open – Singles =

Singles
- 2001 Telenordia Swedish Open

Final
- Champion: (Italy) Andrea Gaudenzi
- Runner-up: (Czech Republic) Bohdan Ulihrach
- Score: 7–5, 6–3

Details
- Draw: 32
- Seeds: 8

Events
| Singles | Doubles |
- Telenordia Swedish Open

Magnus Norman was the defending champion but lost in the semifinals to Bohdan Ulihrach.

Andrea Gaudenzi won in the final 7–5, 6–3 against Ulihrach.

== Seeds ==
A champion seed is indicated in bold text while text in italics indicates the round in which that seed was eliminated.

1. (Sweden) Magnus Norman (semifinals)
2. (Slovakia) Dominik Hrbatý (first round)
3. (Spain) Albert Portas (quarterfinals)
4. (Sweden) Andreas Vinciguerra (second round)
5. (Czech Republic) Bohdan Ulihrach (final)
6. (Czech Republic) Michal Tabara (quarterfinals)
7. (Sweden) Magnus Gustafsson (first round)
8. (Spain) Fernando Vicente (first round)

== Draw ==
Key

- Q = Qualifier
- WC = Wild card
- LL = Lucky loser
- Alt = Alternate
- ITF = ITF entry
- PR = Protected ranking
- SR = Special ranking
- SE = Special exempt
- JE = Junior exempt
- JR = Junior Accelerator Programme entrant
- CO = College Accelerator Programme entrant
- NG = Next Gen Accelerator Program entrant
- w/o = Walkover
- r = Retired
- d = Defaulted

First round
WC/1 | (Sweden) **M Norman** | **6** | **6**
(Argentina) M Puerta | 2 | 1
(Australia) **A Ilie** | **6** | 4 | **6**
WC | (Sweden) M Larsson | 3 | **6** | 4
(Czech Republic) C Doseděl | 3 | 2
Q | (United States) **M Russell** | **6** | **6**
(Belgium) **C Rochus** | **7** | **6**
8 | (Spain) F Vicente | 5 | 2
3 | (Spain) **A Portas** | **6** | **6**
Q | (Russia) D Vlasov | 2 | 0
(Argentina) **J Acasuso** | **6** | **6**
(Spain) D Sánchez | 3 | 2
(Brazil) **F Meligeni** | **6** | **6**
(Germany) J Knippschild | 4 | 1
LL | (Sweden) F Jonsson | 3 | 4
5 | (Czech Republic) **B Ulihrach** | **6** | **6**
7 | (Sweden) M Gustafsson | 3 | 3
(Argentina) **A Calleri** | **6** | **6**
(Spain) **T Robredo** | **6** | **6**
(Chile) N Massú | 3 | 4
(Spain) G Blanco | 3 | 1
(Italy) **A Gaudenzi** | **6** | **6**
Q | (Argentina) M Hood | 1 | 4
4 | (Sweden) **A Vinciguerra** | **6** | **6**
6 | (Czech Republic) **M Tabara** | 6^{10} | **6** | **6**
(Belgium) O Rochus | **7^{12}** | 4 | 4
(Spain) J Díaz | 2 | 3
WC | (Sweden) **J Settergren** | **6** | **6**
(Morocco) **Y El Aynaoui** | 6^{7} | **7^{7}** | **6**
Q | (Sweden) K Flygt | **7^{9}** | 6^{4} | 1
(Austria) **M Hipfl** | **6** | **6**
2 | (Slovakia) D Hrbatý | 4 | 4

Second round
WC/1 | (Sweden) **M Norman** | **6** | **6**
(Australia) A Ilie | 4 | 3
Q | (United States) M Russell | 1 | 1
(Belgium) **C Rochus** | **6** | **6**
3 | (Spain) **A Portas** | **7^{7}** | 3 | **6**
(Argentina) J Acasuso | 6^{5} | **6** | 3
(Brazil) F Meligeni | 5 | 4
5 | (Czech Republic) **B Ulihrach** | **7** | **6**
(Argentina) A Calleri | **7^{7}** | 6^{4} | 3
(Spain) **T Robredo** | 6^{2} | **7^{7}** | **6**
(Italy) **A Gaudenzi** | **7** | **6**
4 | (Sweden) A Vinciguerra | 5 | 1
6 | (Czech Republic) **M Tabara** | **6** | **6**
WC | (Sweden) J Settergren | 4 | 0
(Morocco) **Y El Aynaoui** | **7^{7}** | **6**
(Austria) M Hipfl | 6^{5} | 3

Quarterfinals
WC/1 | (Sweden) **M Norman** | 3 | **6** | **7**
(Belgium) C Rochus | **6** | 3 | 5
3 | (Spain) A Portas | 2 | **6** | 6^{4}
5 | (Czech Republic) **B Ulihrach** | **6** | 3 | **7^{7}**
(Spain) T Robredo | 5 | **6** | 3
(Italy) **A Gaudenzi** | **7** | 4 | **6**
6 | (Czech Republic) M Tabara | 4 | 2
(Morocco) **Y El Aynaoui** | **6** | **6**

Semifinals
WC/1 | (Sweden) M Norman | 2 | **6** | 1
5 | (Czech Republic) **B Ulihrach** | **6** | 4 | **6**
(Italy) **A Gaudenzi** | **6** | **7^{7}**
(Morocco) Y El Aynaoui | 2 | 6^{1}

Final
5 | (Czech Republic) Bohdan Ulihrach | 5 | 3
(Italy) **Andrea Gaudenzi** | **7** | **6**
