= Carl Bergman =

Swedish tennis player

- Country (sports): Sweden
- Residence: Vejbystrand, Sweden
- Born: 10 October 1987 (age 37); Helsingborg, Sweden
- Plays: Left-handed
- Prize money: $41,282

Singles
- Career record: 0–0
- Career titles: 0; 2 ITF
- Highest ranking: No. 500 (30 January 2012)

Doubles
- Career record: 1–3
- Career titles: 0; 7 ITF
- Highest ranking: No. 475 (15 September 2008)
- Last updated on: 20 February 2017.

Carl Johan Arvid Bergman (born 10 October 1987) is a retired Swedish tennis player.

== Career ==
Bergman made his ATP main draw debut at the 2008 Swedish Open in the doubles draw partnering Henrik Norfeldt. The pair lost in the second round to David Ferrer and Marc Lopez. Bergman also participated in the doubles at the 2010 Swedish Open, partnering Filip Prpic and the 2011 Swedish Open, partnering Patrik Rosenholm. On each of those occasions he and his partner lost in the first round. As per ATP Tour and ITF World Tennis Tour main draw, Bergman won 104 singles matches and lost 85 and in career doubles, he won 94 and lost 66.

Bergman has a career high ATP singles ranking of 500 achieved on 30 January 2012. He also has a career-high ATP doubles ranking of 475 achieved on 15 September 2008.

== ITF Futures titles ==
=== Singles: (2) ===
No.	Date	Tournament	Surface	Opponent	Score
1.	Apr 2007	Sweden F3, Norrköping	Hard	(Germany) Philipp Marx	4–6, 6–3, 7–5
2.	Sep 2011	Israel F8, Haifa	Hard	(Germany) Stefan Seifert	7–6^{(11–9)}, 6–3

=== Doubles: (7) ===
No.	Date	Tournament	Surface	Partner	Opponents	Score
1,	May 2007	Bulgaria F1, Sofia	Clay	(Sweden) Daniel Kumlin	(Finland) Juho Paukku (Italy) Matteo Volante	6–1, 6–1
2.	May 2007	Bulgaria F2, Rousse	Clay	(Sweden) Daniel Kumlin	(Bulgaria) Boris Nicola Bakalov (India) Ashutosh Singh	6–2, 2–6, 6–3
3.	Mar 2008	Switzerland F2, Bassersdorf	Carpet	(Sweden) Henrik Norfeldt	(Switzerland) Alexander Sadecky (Switzerland) Jean-Claude Scherrer	6–2, 4–6, [10–4]
4.	Sep 2010	Sweden F2, Falun	Hard	(Sweden) Markus Eriksson	(Sweden) Tobias Blomgren (Finland) Micke Kontinen	3–6, 6–3, [10–4]
5.	Jun 2011	Germany F6, Trier	Clay	(Finland) Juho Paukku	(Germany) Peter Gojowczyk (Germany) Marc Sieber	6–4, 6–1
6.	Sep 2011	Sweden F4, Uppsala	Hard	(Sweden) Markus Eriksson	(United Kingdom) Lewis Burton (United Kingdom) James Marsalek	6–3, 6–4
7.	Oct 2011	Sweden F7, Lidköping	Hard	(Sweden) Patrik Rosenholm	(Sweden) Jesper Brunstrom (Sweden) Markus Eriksson	6–4, 4–6, [10–5]
