= 2006 Swedish Open =

- Date: 10-16 July
- Edition: 59th
- Category: International Series
- Draw: 32S / 16D
- Prize money: $355,000
- Surface: Clay / outdoor
- Location: Båstad, Sweden

Champions

Singles
- (Spain) Tommy Robredo

Doubles
- (Sweden) Jonas Björkman / (Sweden) Thomas Johansson
← 2005 ·	Swedish Open	· 2007 →

The 2006 Swedish Open was the 2006 edition of the men's tennis tournament. The tournament was held from 10–16 July. It was the 59th edition of the Swedish Open and was part of the International Series of the 2008 ATP Tour. Second-seeded Tommy Robredo won the singles title.

== Finals ==
=== Singles ===
(Spain) Tommy Robredo defeated (Russia) Nikolay Davydenko, 6–2, 6–1

- It was Robredo's 2nd singles title of the year and the 4th of his career.

=== Doubles ===
(Sweden) Jonas Björkman / (Sweden) Thomas Johansson defeated (Germany) Christopher Kas / (Austria) Oliver Marach, 6–3, 4–6, [10–4]
