= 2008 Swedish Open =

- Date: 7–13 July
- Edition: 61st
- Category: International Series
- Draw: 32S / 16D
- Prize money: €305,000
- Surface: Clay / outdoor
- Location: Båstad, Sweden
- Venue: Båstad tennisstadion

Champions

Singles
- (Spain) Tommy Robredo

Doubles
- (Sweden) Jonas Björkman / (Sweden) Robin Söderling
- Swedish Open

The 2008 Swedish Open (also known as the Catella Swedish Open for sponsorship reasons) was a men's tennis tournament played on outdoor clay courts. It was the 61st edition of the Swedish Open, and was part of the International Series of the 2008 ATP Tour. It took place at the Båstad tennisstadion in Båstad, Sweden, from 7 July through 13 July 2008.

The singles draw was headlined by new ATP No. 4, Valencia and 's-Hertogenbosch titlist and Båstad defending champion David Ferrer, Nottingham finalist Fernando Verdasco, and Warsaw runner-up and 2006 Båstad winner Tommy Robredo. Also present were Miami Masters semifinalist Tomáš Berdych, Costa do Sauípe runner-up and 2002 Båstad champion Carlos Moyá, Gaël Monfils, Jarkko Nieminen and Robin Söderling.

== Finals ==
=== Singles ===
(Spain) Tommy Robredo defeated (Czech Republic) Tomáš Berdych, 6–4, 6–1

- It was Tommy Robredo's 1st title of the year, and his 7th overall. It was his 2nd win at the event.

=== Doubles ===
(Sweden) Jonas Björkman / (Sweden) Robin Söderling defeated (Sweden) Johan Brunström / (Netherlands Antilles) Jean-Julien Rojer, 6–2, 6–2
