= 2009 Swedish Open – Men's doubles =

Men's doubles
- 2009 Swedish Open

Final
- Champions: (Czech Republic) Jaroslav Levinský (Slovakia) Filip Polášek
- Runners-up: (Sweden) Robert Lindstedt (Sweden) Robin Söderling
- Score: 1–6, 6–3, [10–7]

Details
- Draw: 16
- Seeds: 4

Events
Singles	men	women
Doubles	men	women
- Swedish Open

Jonas Björkman and Robin Söderling were the defending champions, but Björkman retired from tennis before being able to defend the title.

Söderling teamed up with Robert Lindstedt, but Jaroslav Levinský and Filip Polášek defeated them in the final 1–6, 6–3, [10–7].

== Seeds ==
1. (Sweden) Simon Aspelin / (Australia) Paul Hanley (quarterfinals)
2. (Sweden) Johan Brunström / (Netherlands Antilles) Jean-Julien Rojer (first round)
3. (Czech Republic) Jaroslav Levinský / (Slovakia) Filip Polášek (champions)
4. (Spain) Marc López / (Spain) Tommy Robredo (semifinals)

== Draw ==
Key

- Q = Qualifier
- WC = Wild card
- LL = Lucky loser
- Alt = Alternate
- ITF = ITF entry
- PR = Protected ranking
- SR = Special ranking
- SE = Special exempt
- JE = Junior exempt
- JR = Junior Accelerator Programme entrant
- CO = College Accelerator Programme entrant
- NG = Next Gen Accelerator Program entrant
- w/o = Walkover
- r = Retired
- d = Defaulted

=== Draw ===
First round
1	(Sweden) S Aspelin (Australia) P Hanley	3	7^{8}	[15]
(Russia) M Elgin (Germany) F Moser	6	6^{6}	[13]
(Argentina) M González (Argentina) J Mónaco	3	4
(Spain) N Almagro (Spain) S Ventura	6	6
3	(Czech Republic) J Levinský (Slovakia) F Polášek	2	6	[10]
(United States) J Cerretani (Pakistan) A-u-H Qureshi	6	3	[6]
(Spain) M Granollers (Italy) P Starace	7^{7}	4	[10]
(Germany) P Marx (Germany) B Phau	6^{3}	6	[4]
(Austria) D Köllerer (Belgium) C Rochus	6	2	[6]
WC	(Austria) J Melzer (Sweden) A Vinciguerra	4	6	[10]
(Belgium) S Darcis (Portugal) F Gil	3	2
4	(Spain) M López (Spain) T Robredo	6	6
(Netherlands) R Wassen (Slovakia) I Zelenay	6	7
WC	(Sweden) D Berta (Sweden) P Brydolf	1	5
(Sweden) R Lindstedt (Sweden) R Söderling	6	6
2	(Sweden) J Brunström (Netherlands Antilles) J-J Rojer	4	4

Quarterfinals
1	(Sweden) S Aspelin (Australia) P Hanley	3	4
(Spain) N Almagro (Spain) S Ventura	6	6
3	(Czech Republic) J Levinský (Slovakia) F Polášek	6	6
(Spain) M Granollers (Italy) P Starace	3	3
WC	(Austria) J Melzer (Sweden) A Vinciguerra	4	3
4	(Spain) M López (Spain) T Robredo	6	6
(Netherlands) R Wassen (Slovakia) I Zelenay	6^{3}	4
(Sweden) R Lindstedt (Sweden) R Söderling	7^{7}	6

Semifinals
(Spain) N Almagro (Spain) S Ventura	4	7^{7}	[7]
3	(Czech Republic) J Levinský (Slovakia) F Polášek	6	6^{5}	[10]
4	(Spain) M López (Spain) T Robredo	4	6^{7}
(Sweden) R Lindstedt (Sweden) R Söderling	6	7^{9}

Final
3	(Czech Republic) J Levinský (Slovakia) F Polášek	1	6	[10]
(Sweden) R Lindstedt (Sweden) R Söderling	6	3	[7]
