= 2009 Swedish Open – Men's singles =

Men's singles
- 2009 Swedish Open

Final
- Champion: (Sweden) Robin Söderling
- Runner-up: (Argentina) Juan Mónaco
- Score: 6–3, 7–6^{(7–4)}

Details
- Draw: 28
- Seeds: 8

Events
Singles	men	women
Doubles	men	women
- Swedish Open

Tommy Robredo was the defending champion, but lost in the semifinals to Juan Mónaco.

Second-seeded Robin Söderling won in the final 6–3, 7–6^{(7–4)}, against Juan Mónaco.

== Seeds ==
The top four seeds receive a bye into the second round.

1. (Spain) Fernando Verdasco (quarterfinals, retired due to a right calf injury)
2. (Sweden) Robin Söderling (champion)
3. (Spain) Tommy Robredo (semifinals)
4. (Austria) Jürgen Melzer (quarterfinals)
5. (Spain) Nicolás Almagro (quarterfinals)
6. (France) Florent Serra (first round)
7. (Belgium) Christophe Rochus (first round)
8. (Argentina) Máximo González (first round)

== Draw ==
Key

- Q = Qualifier
- WC = Wild card
- LL = Lucky loser
- Alt = Alternate
- ITF = ITF entry
- PR = Protected ranking
- SR = Special ranking
- SE = Special exempt
- JE = Junior exempt
- JR = Junior Accelerator Programme entrant
- CO = College Accelerator Programme entrant
- NG = Next Gen Accelerator Program entrant
- w/o = Walkover
- r = Retired
- d = Defaulted

=== Finals ===
Semifinals
(Argentina) Juan Mónaco	6	6
3	(Spain) Tommy Robredo	0	2
WC	(Sweden) Andreas Vinciguerra	1	6^{6}
2	(Sweden) Robin Söderling	6	7^{8}

Final
(Argentina) Juan Mónaco	3	6^{4}
2	(Sweden) Robin Söderling	6	7^{7}

=== Top half ===
First round
(Austria) D Köllerer	1	6	6
(Belgium) S Darcis	6	3	4
(Romania) V Crivoi	6	6
(Uzbekistan) D Istomin	0	4
(Argentina) J Mónaco	7^{7}	3	6
8	(Argentina) M González	6^{4}	6	1
(Spain) A Martín	2	2
Q	(Australia) P Luczak	6	6
WC	(Sweden) D Berta	3	2
(Germany) B Phau	6	6
(Russia) T Gabashvili	4	6	6
7	(Belgium) C Rochus	6	1	0

Second round
1	(Spain) F Verdasco	6^{1}	6	7
(Austria) D Köllerer	7^{7}	2	5
(Romania) V Crivoi	0	6^{1}
(Argentina) J Mónaco	6	7^{7}
3	(Spain) T Robredo	6	6
Q	(Australia) P Luczak	2	3
(Germany) B Phau	3	2
(Russia) T Gabashvili	6	6

Quarterfinals
1	(Spain) F Verdasco	1	1^{r}
(Argentina) J Mónaco	6	3
3	(Spain) T Robredo	6	6
(Russia) T Gabashvili	4	0

Semifinals
(Argentina) J Mónaco	6	6
3	(Spain) T Robredo	0	2

=== Bottom half ===
First round
6	(France) F Serra	7^{7}	3	4
WC	(Sweden) A Vinciguerra	6^{5}	6	6
WC	(Bulgaria) G Dimitrov	3	6^{2}
Q	(Argentina) G Cañas	6	7^{7}
Q	(Spain) D Gimeno Traver	6	6
(Portugal) F Gil	1	4
5	(Spain) N Almagro	6	7^{8}
(Russia) M Safin	3	6^{6}
(France) J Benneteau	6^{5}	3
Q	(Italy) P Starace	7^{7}	6
(Spain) M Granollers	6^{3}	4
(Belgium) K Vliegen	7^{7}	6

Second round
WC	(Sweden) A Vinciguerra	6^{5}	6	6
Q	(Argentina) G Cañas	7^{7}	3	4
Q	(Spain) D Gimeno Traver	2	2
4	(Austria) J Melzer	6	6
5	(Spain) N Almagro	2	6	6
Q	(Italy) P Starace	6	1	1
(Belgium) K Vliegen	2	3
2	(Sweden) R Söderling	6	6

Quarterfinals
WC	(Sweden) A Vinciguerra	2	6	6
4	(Austria) J Melzer	6	4	3
5	(Spain) N Almagro	5	3
2	(Sweden) R Söderling	7	6

Semifinals
WC	(Sweden) A Vinciguerra	1	6^{6}
2	(Sweden) R Söderling	6	7^{8}
