= 2002 Swedish Open =

- Date: 8–14 July
- Edition: 55th
- Category: International Series
- Draw: 32S / 16D
- Prize money: $356,000
- Surface: Clay / outdoor
- Location: Båstad, Sweden

Champions

Singles
- (Spain) Carlos Moyá

Doubles
- (Sweden) Jonas Björkman / (Australia) Todd Woodbridge
- Swedish Open

The 2002 Swedish Open was a men's tennis tournament played on outdoor clay courts in Båstad in Sweden and was part of the International Series of the 2002 ATP Tour. It was the 55th edition of the tournament and ran from 8 July until 14 July 2002. Third-seeded Carlos Moyá won the singles title.

== Finals ==
=== Singles ===
(Spain) Carlos Moyá defeated (Morocco) Younes El Aynaoui 6–3, 2–6, 7–5

- It was Moyá's 2nd singles title of the year and the 9th of his career.

=== Doubles ===
(Sweden) Jonas Björkman / (Australia) Todd Woodbridge defeated (Australia) Paul Hanley / (Australia) Michael Hill 7–6^{(8–6)}, 6–4

- It was Björkman's 5th title of the year and the 34th of his career. It was Woodbridge's 4th title of the year and the 76th of his career.
