= 2011 Swedish Open – Men's singles =

Men's singles
- 2011 Swedish Open

Final
- Champion: (Sweden) Robin Söderling
- Runner-up: (Spain) David Ferrer
- Score: 6–2, 6–2

Details
- Draw: 28
- Seeds: 8

Events
Singles	men	women
Doubles	men	women
← 2010 ·	Swedish Open	· 2012 →

Nicolás Almagro was the defending champion, but he lost to David Ferrer in the semifinals.

Top seed Robin Söderling won his second Swedish Open title by defeating David Ferrer 6–2, 6–2. It also became the last professional match of Söderling's career.

== Seeds ==
The top four seeds received a bye into the second round.

1. (Sweden) Robin Söderling (champion)
2. (Spain) David Ferrer (final)
3. (Czech Republic) Tomáš Berdych (semifinals)
4. (Spain) Nicolás Almagro (semifinals)
5. (Spain) Tommy Robredo (first round, retired due to a left thigh injury)
6. (Argentina) Juan Mónaco (second round, withdrew due to a right foot injury)
7. (Kazakhstan) Andrey Golubev (first round)
8. (Italy) Potito Starace (quarterfinals)

== Draw ==
=== Key ===
- Q = Qualifier
- WC = Wild card
- LL = Lucky loser
- Alt = Alternate
- SE = Special exempt
- PR = Protected ranking
- ITF = ITF entry
- JE = Junior exempt
- w/o = Walkover
- r = Retired
- d = Defaulted
- SR = Special ranking

=== Finals ===
Semifinals
1	(Sweden) Robin Söderling	6	6
3	(Czech Republic) Tomáš Berdych	1	0
4	(Spain) Nicolás Almagro	1	3
2	(Spain) David Ferrer	6	6

Final
1	(Sweden) Robin Söderling	6	6
2	(Spain) David Ferrer	2	2

=== Top half ===
First round
(Russia) I Andreev	6^{3}	6	4
Q	(Argentina) D Junqueira	7^{7}	3	6
WC	(Sweden) A Vinciguerra	1	6	3
Q	(France) J Dasnières de Veigy	6	1	6
(Germany) J Reister	6^{6}	3
8	(Italy) P Starace	7^{8}	6
(Russia) T Gabashvili	6	3	6
SE	(United States) M Yani	3	6	3
(France) J Benneteau	4	6	5
(Slovenia) B Kavčič	6	4	7
(Argentina) C Berlocq	7^{7}	6^{7}	2
6	(Argentina) J Mónaco	6^{5}	7^{9}	6

Second round
1	(Sweden) R Söderling	6	6
Q	(Argentina) D Junqueira	0	1
Q	(France) J Dasnières de Veigy	0	7^{7}	2
8	(Italy) P Starace	6	6^{5}	6
3	(Czech Republic) T Berdych	6	6
(Russia) T Gabashvili	2	2
(Slovenia) B Kavčič	w/o
6	(Argentina) J Mónaco

Quarterfinals
1	(Sweden) R Söderling	6	6
8	(Italy) P Starace	3	4
3	(Czech Republic) T Berdych	6	6
(Slovenia) B Kavčič	1	4

Semifinals
1	(Sweden) R Söderling	6	6
3	(Czech Republic) T Berdych	1	0

=== Bottom half ===
First round
7	(Kazakhstan) A Golubev	7^{7}	1	2
(Spain) R Ramírez Hidalgo	6^{4}	6	6
WC	(Sweden) M Ryderstedt	6	2	6
(Argentina) M González	4	6	2
Q	(Croatia) A Veić	4	1
Q	(Spain) G Olaso	6	6
5	(Spain) T Robredo	5	5	r
(Italy) F Volandri	7	5
(Kazakhstan) M Kukushkin	5	2
(Austria) A Haider-Maurer	7	6
WC	(Sweden) C Lindell	4	2
(Spain) P Riba	6	6

Second round
(Spain) R Ramírez Hidalgo	4	2
WC	(Sweden) M Ryderstedt	6	6
Q	(Spain) G Olaso	2	3
4	(Spain) N Almagro	6	6
(Italy) F Volandri	3	6^{7}
(Austria) A Haider-Maurer	6	7^{9}
(Spain) P Riba	2	6^{4}
2	(Spain) D Ferrer	6	7^{7}

Quarterfinals
WC	(Sweden) M Ryderstedt	4	6^{4}
4	(Spain) N Almagro	6	7^{7}
(Austria) A Haider-Maurer	1	1
2	(Spain) D Ferrer	6	6

Semifinals
4	(Spain) N Almagro	1	3
2	(Spain) D Ferrer	6	6
