= 2013 Swedish Open – Men's singles =

Men's singles
- 2013 Swedish Open

Final
- Champion: (Argentina) Carlos Berlocq
- Runner-up: (Spain) Fernando Verdasco
- Score: 7–5, 6–1

Details
- Draw: 28
- Seeds: 8

Events
| Singles | men | women |
| Doubles | men | women |
- Swedish Open

David Ferrer was the defending singles champion, but withdrew before the beginning of the tournament because of an ankle injury.
Unseeded Carlos Berlocq won the title, defeating Fernando Verdasco in the final, 7–5, 6–1.

== Seeds ==
The top four seeds receive a bye into the second round.

1. (Czech Republic) Tomáš Berdych (quarterfinals)
2. (Spain) Nicolás Almagro (quarterfinals)
3. (Argentina) Juan Mónaco (quarterfinals)
4. (Spain) Tommy Robredo (second round)
5. (Bulgaria) Grigor Dimitrov (semifinals)
6. (Serbia) Viktor Troicki (second round)
7. (Argentina) Horacio Zeballos (first round)
8. (Spain) Fernando Verdasco (final)

== Draw ==
Key

- Q = Qualifier
- WC = Wild card
- LL = Lucky loser
- Alt = Alternate
- ITF = ITF entry
- PR = Protected ranking
- SR = Special ranking
- SE = Special exempt
- JE = Junior exempt
- JR = Junior Accelerator Programme entrant
- CO = College Accelerator Programme entrant
- NG = Next Gen Accelerator Program entrant
- w/o = Walkover
- r = Retired
- d = Defaulted

=== Finals ===
Semifinals
(Netherlands) Thiemo de Bakker | 5 | 3
(Argentina) Carlos Berlocq | 7 | 6
5 | (Bulgaria) Grigor Dimitrov | 6^{3} | 7 | 5
8 | (Spain) Fernando Verdasco | 7^{7} | 5 | 7

Final
(Argentina) Carlos Berlocq | 7 | 6
8 | (Spain) Fernando Verdasco | 5 | 1

=== Top half ===
First round
(Argentina) M Alund | 7 | 6^{5} | 7^{10}
WC | (Sweden) M Eriksson | 5 | 7^{7} | 6^{8}
Q | (Argentina) D Schwartzman | 2 | 4
(Netherlands) T de Bakker | 6 | 6
(Brazil) J Souza | 4 | 2
6 | (Serbia) V Troicki | 6 | 6
(Spain) A Ramos | 6 | 6
Q | (Germany) J Reister | 3 | 3
LL | (Romania) M Copil | 4 | 1
(Slovenia) B Kavčič | 6 | 6
(Argentina) C Berlocq | 6 | 6
7 | (Argentina) H Zeballos | 4 | 3

Second round
1 | (Czech Republic) T Berdych | 6 | 6
(Argentina) M Alund | 3 | 0
(Netherlands) T de Bakker | 6 | 4 | 7^{8}
6 | (Serbia) V Troicki | 4 | 6 | 6^{6}
4 | (Spain) T Robredo | 3 | 4
(Spain) A Ramos | 6 | 6
(Slovenia) B Kavčič | 5 | 3
(Argentina) C Berlocq | 7 | 6

Quarterfinals
1 | (Czech Republic) T Berdych | 5 | 5
(Netherlands) T de Bakker | 7 | 7
(Spain) A Ramos | 3 | 6 | 0
(Argentina) C Berlocq | 6 | 3 | 6

Semifinals
(Netherlands) T de Bakker | 5 | 3
(Argentina) C Berlocq | 7 | 6

=== Bottom half ===
First round
5 | (Bulgaria) G Dimitrov | 5 | 6 | 6
WC | (Sweden) E Ymer | 7 | 2 | 4
(Italy) F Volandri | 6 | 6
PR | (Estonia) J Zopp | 1 | 2
Q | (Switzerland) H Laaksonen | 5 | 6 | 6
Q | (Croatia) A Veić | 7 | 1 | 1
8 | (Spain) F Verdasco | 6 | 7^{7}
WC | (Sweden) A Vinciguerra | 4 | 6^{3}
(Germany) J-L Struff | 6 | 6
(Ukraine) S Stakhovsky | 3 | 3
(Czech Republic) J Hájek | 6^{4} | 1
(Spain) G García López | 7^{7} | 6

Second round
5 | (Bulgaria) G Dimitrov | 2 | 6 | 6
(Italy) F Volandri | 6 | 1 | 4
Q | (Switzerland) H Laaksonen | 4 | 2
3 | (Argentina) J Mónaco | 6 | 6
8 | (Spain) F Verdasco | 6 | 7
(Germany) J-L Struff | 1 | 5
(Spain) G García López | 6 | 1 | 1
2 | (Spain) N Almagro | 3 | 6 | 6

Quarterfinals
5 | (Bulgaria) G Dimitrov | 6 | 6
3 | (Argentina) J Mónaco | 3 | 2
8 | (Spain) F Verdasco | 6 | 4 | 7
2 | (Spain) N Almagro | 4 | 6 | 5

Semifinals
5 | (Bulgaria) G Dimitrov | 6^{3} | 7 | 5
8 | (Spain) F Verdasco | 7^{7} | 5 | 7

== Qualifying ==
=== Seeds ===
1. (Germany) Julian Reister (qualified)
2. (Romania) Marius Copil (qualifying competition, lucky loser)
3. (Germany) Matthias Bachinger (qualifying competition)
4. (Argentina) Diego Sebastián Schwartzman (qualified)
5. (Croatia) Antonio Veić (qualified)
6. (Argentina) Renzo Olivo (second round)
7. (Switzerland) Henri Laaksonen (qualified)
8. (Republic of Ireland) James McGee (second round)

=== Qualifiers ===
1. (Germany) Julian Reister
2. (Switzerland) Henri Laaksonen
3. (Croatia) Antonio Veić
4. (Argentina) Diego Sebastián Schwartzman

=== Lucky loser ===
1. (Romania) Marius Copil

=== Qualifying draw ===
==== First qualifier ====
First round
1 | (Germany) Julian Reister | 6 | 3
(Russia) Mikhail Elgin | 1 | 0^{r}
(Italy) Francesco Vilardo | 1 | 0
(Sweden) Patrik Rosenholm | 6 | 6
(Sweden) Fred Simonsson | 7^{7} | 2 | 5
(Sweden) Isak Arvidsson | 6^{5} | 6 | 7
(Italy) Alberto Brizzi | 5 | 4
8 | (Republic of Ireland) James McGee | 7 | 6

Second round
1 | (Germany) Julian Reister | 6 | 7^{7}
(Sweden) Patrik Rosenholm | 1 | 6^{5}
(Sweden) Isak Arvidsson | 6 | 5 | 6
8 | (Republic of Ireland) James McGee | 1 | 7 | 3

Qualifying competition
1 | (Germany) Julian Reister | 6 | 6
(Sweden) Isak Arvidsson | 3 | 2

==== Second qualifier ====
First round
2 | (Romania) Marius Copil | 7 | 6
(Norway) Joachim Bjerke | 5 | 3
(Sweden) Igor Tubic | 6 | 7
(Sweden) Philip Möbius | 3 | 5
(Sweden) Daniel Windahl | 6 | 6
(Sweden) Johan Bäckström | 0 | 2
(Sweden) Filip Karlsson | 1 | 1
7 | (Switzerland) Henri Laaksonen | 6 | 6

Second round
2 | (Romania) Marius Copil | 6 | 6
(Sweden) Igor Tubic | 0 | 3
(Sweden) Daniel Windahl | 6^{9} | 6 | 3
7 | (Switzerland) Henri Laaksonen | 7^{11} | 4 | 6

Qualifying competition
2 | (Romania) Marius Copil | 6 | 6^{4} | 6^{7}
7 | (Switzerland) Henri Laaksonen | 3 | 7^{7} | 7^{9}

==== Third qualifier ====
First round
3 | (Germany) Matthias Bachinger | 6 | 6
(Finland) Timo Nieminen | 4 | 1
(United States) Nicholas Monroe | 7 | 7^{8}
(Finland) Micke Kontinen | 5 | 6^{6}
(Sweden) Milos Sekulic | 6 | 1 | 2
(Sweden) Filip Bergevi | 2 | 6 | 6
(Sweden) Lucas Renard | 2 | 3
5 | (Croatia) Antonio Veić | 6 | 6

Second round
3 | (Germany) Matthias Bachinger | 6 | 6
(United States) Nicholas Monroe | 3 | 4
(Sweden) Filip Bergevi | 3 | 4
5 | (Croatia) Antonio Veić | 6 | 6

Qualifying competition
3 | (Germany) Matthias Bachinger | 7 | 4 | 3
5 | (Croatia) Antonio Veić | 5 | 6 | 6

==== Fourth qualifier ====
First round
4 | (Argentina) Diego Sebastián Schwartzman | 6 | 6
(Sweden) Jacob Adaktusson | 0 | 2
(Sweden) Nima Madani | 2 | 0
WC | (Sweden) Jonathan Mridha | 6 | 6
WC | (Sweden) Morgan Johansson | 1 | 3
(France) Lucas Pouille | 6 | 6
(Italy) Roberto Marcora | 4 | 6 | 3
6 | (Argentina) Renzo Olivo | 6 | 3 | 6

Second round
4 | (Argentina) Diego Sebastián Schwartzman | 6 | 6
WC | (Sweden) Jonathan Mridha | 0 | 2
(France) Lucas Pouille | 6 | 3 | 7
6 | (Argentina) Renzo Olivo | 4 | 6 | 5

Qualifying competition
4 | (Argentina) Diego Sebastián Schwartzman | 6 | 6
(France) Lucas Pouille | 4 | 3
