= Hans Jacob Carstensen =

Danish businessperson

Hans Jacob Carstensen (born 17 October 1965) is a Danish businessperson.

He has a cand.oecon. degree from the Aarhus University in 1989, and attended INSEAD from 2002 to 2004. He was a senior vice president in TeleDanmark and chief financial officer in Telenordia before becoming CFO of Egmont in 2002. He is also the vicechair of TV 2.
