= 2010 Swedish Open =

- Date: 5–11 July (women); 12-18 July (men)
- Edition: 2nd (women); 63rd (men)
- Location: Båstad, Sweden

Champions

Men's singles
- (Spain) Nicolás Almagro

Women's singles
- (France) Aravane Rezaï

Men's doubles
- (Sweden) Robert Lindstedt / (Romania) Horia Tecău

Women's doubles
- (Argentina) Gisela Dulko / (Italy) Flavia Pennetta
← 2009 ·	Swedish Open	· 2011 →

The 2010 Swedish Open was a tennis tournament played on outdoor clay courts part of the ATP World Tour 250 Series of the 2010 ATP World Tour and 2010 WTA Tour. It took place in Båstad, Sweden, from July 5 through July 11, 2010 for Women's and from July 12 through July 18, 2010 for Men's. It was also known as 2010 Collector Swedish Open for the Women's and 2010 SkiStar Swedish Open for the Men's for sponsorship reasons. It was the 2nd edition for the Women's, while the 63rd for the Men's.

== Finals ==
=== Men's singles ===
(Spain) Nicolás Almagro defeated (Sweden) Robin Söderling 7–5, 3–6, 6–2

- It was Almagro's first title of the year and 6th of his career.

=== Women's singles ===
(France) Aravane Rezaï defeated (Argentina) Gisela Dulko, 6–3, 4–6, 6–4

- It was Rezaï's second title of the year and 4th of her career.

=== Men's doubles ===
(Sweden) Robert Lindstedt / (Romania) Horia Tecău defeated (Italy) Andreas Seppi / (Italy) Simone Vagnozzi, 6–4, 7–5

=== Women's doubles ===
(Argentina) Gisela Dulko / (Italy) Flavia Pennetta defeated (Czech Republic) Renata Voráčová / (Czech Republic) Barbora Záhlavová-Strýcová 7–6^{(7–0)}, 6–0

== WTA entrants ==
=== Players ===
Player	Nationality	Ranking*	Seeding
Flavia Pennetta	Italy	10	1
Aravane Rezaï	France	20	2
Lucie Šafářová	Czech Republic	26	3
Gisela Dulko	Argentina	42	4
Arantxa Parra Santonja	Spain	47	5
Angelique Kerber	Germany	54	6
Sofia Arvidsson	Sweden	66	7
Barbora Záhlavová Strýcová	Czech Republic	68	8

- Seedings are based on the rankings of June 21, 2010.

=== Other entrants ===
The following players received wildcards into the singles main draw

- (Sweden) Ellen Allgurin
- (Sweden) Anna Brazhnikova
- (United States) Sloane Stephens

The following players received entry from the qualifying draw:

- (Spain) Nuria Llagostera Vives
- (Germany) Laura Siegemund
- (Croatia) Ana Vrljić
- (Germany) Kathrin Wörle

== ATP entrants ==
=== Seeds ===
Player	Nationality	Ranking*	Seeding
Robin Söderling	Sweden	5	1
Fernando Verdasco	Spain	10	2
David Ferrer	(Spain)	12	3
Nicolás Almagro	Spain	20	4
Tommy Robredo	Spain	36	5
Paul-Henri Mathieu	France	51	6
Denis Istomin	Uzbekistan	59	7
Florent Serra	France	60	8

- Seedings are based on the rankings of July 5, 2010.

=== Other entrants ===
The following players received wildcards into the singles main draw

- (Sweden) Andreas Vinciguerra
- (Sweden) Filip Prpic
- (Sweden) Christian Lindell

The following players received entry from the qualifying draw:

- (France) Jonathan Dasnières de Veigy
- (Sweden) Ervin Eleskovic
- (Poland) Jerzy Janowicz
- (Croatia) Franko Škugor
