= 2026 Swedish Open – Men's singles =

Men's singles
- 2026 Swedish Open

Final
- Champion: Andrey Rublev
- Runner-up: (Italy) Luciano Darderi
- Score: 6–4, 6–3

Details
- Draw: 28
- Seeds: 8

Events
Singles	men	women
Doubles	men	women
- Swedish Open

Andrey Rublev defeated defending champion Luciano Darderi in the final, 6–4, 6–3 to win the men's singles tennis title at the 2026 Swedish Open. It was his 18th career ATP Tour title.

== Seeds ==
The top four seeds received a bye into the second round.

1. Andrey Rublev (champion)
2. (Italy) Luciano Darderi (final)
3. (Chile) Alejandro Tabilo (semifinals)
4. (Argentina) Mariano Navone (second round)
5. (Portugal) Nuno Borges (quarterfinals)
6. (Netherlands) Botic van de Zandschulp (second round)
7. (Argentina) Thiago Agustín Tirante (quarterfinals, withdrew)
8. (Argentina) Sebastián Báez (quarterfinals)

== Draw ==
Key

- Q = Qualifier
- WC = Wild card
- LL = Lucky loser
- Alt = Alternate
- ITF = ITF entry
- PR = Protected ranking
- SR = Special ranking
- SE = Special exempt
- JE = Junior exempt
- JR = Junior Accelerator Programme entrant
- CO = College Accelerator Programme entrant
- NG = Next Gen Accelerator Program entrant
- w/o = Walkover
- r = Retired
- d = Defaulted

=== Finals ===
Semifinals
1	Andrey Rublev	6	4	6
3	(Chile) Alejandro Tabilo	4	6	4
(Paraguay) Adolfo Daniel Vallejo	4	7^{13}	3
2	(Italy) Luciano Darderi	6	6^{11}	6

Final
1	Andrey Rublev	6	6
2	(Italy) Luciano Darderi	4	3

=== Top half ===
First round
(Norway) N Budkov Kjær	3	2
(Italy) A Pellegrino	6	6
(Netherlands) J de Jong	7^{7}	7
(Lithuania) V Gaubas	6^{1}	5
WC	(Sweden) M Dahlin	6	4	1
8	(Argentina) S Báez	4	6	6
(Argentina) F Díaz Acosta	6	4	2
Q	(Argentina) L Midón	3	6	6
(United Kingdom) J Choinski	4	6^{4}
(Georgia (country)) N Basilashvili	6	7^{7}
(Austria) S Ofner	3	4
7	(Argentina) TA Tirante	6	6

Second round
1	A Rublev	7^{7}	6^{7}	6
(Italy) A Pellegrino	6^{3}	7^{9}	3
(Netherlands) J de Jong	4	2
8	(Argentina) S Báez	6	6
3	(Chile) A Tabilo	6	6^{5}	6
Q	(Argentina) L Midón	4	7^{7}	4
(Georgia (country)) N Basilashvili	5	6	4
7	(Argentina) TA Tirante	7	3	6

Quarterfinals
1	A Rublev	6	6
8	(Argentina) S Báez	1	2
3	(Chile) A Tabilo	w/o
7	(Argentina) TA Tirante

Semifinals
1	A Rublev	6	4	6
3	(Chile) A Tabilo	4	6	4

=== Bottom half ===
First round
6	(Netherlands) B van de Zandschulp	7^{7}	6
Q	(Japan) T Daniel	6^{0}	4
(Paraguay) AD Vallejo	6	6
Q	(Spain) M Damas	3	3
(Italy) S Travaglia	6	6
Q	(Czech Republic) M Krumich	4	2
5	(Portugal) N Borges	6	6
WC	(France) M Kouamé	4	2
(Czech Republic) D Svrčina	6^{5}	6	4
WC	(Bulgaria) G Dimitrov	7^{7}	1	6
(Germany) D Altmaier	6	7
(France) H Gaston	2	5

Second round
6	(Netherlands) B van de Zandschulp	6	3	6^{4}
(Paraguay) AD Vallejo	4	6	7^{7}
(Italy) S Travaglia	6	6
4	(Argentina) M Navone	4	2
5	(Portugal) N Borges	6	6
WC	(Bulgaria) G Dimitrov	4	2
(Germany) D Altmaier	4	4
2	(Italy) L Darderi	6	6

Quarterfinals
(Paraguay) AD Vallejo	7^{7}	6
(Italy) S Travaglia	6^{5}	2
5	(Portugal) N Borges	6^{9}	4
2	(Italy) L Darderi	7^{11}	6

Semifinals
(Paraguay) AD Vallejo	4	7^{13}	3
2	(Italy) L Darderi	6	6^{11}	6

== Qualifying ==
=== Seeds ===
1. (Denmark) Elmer Møller (first round)
2. (Spain) Roberto Carballés Baena (first round, retired)
3. (Peru) Gonzalo Bueno (first round)
4. (Italy) Francesco Passaro (qualifying competition)
5. (Japan) Taro Daniel (qualified)
6. (Argentina) Lautaro Midón (qualified)
7. (Portugal) Frederico Ferreira Silva (first round)
8. (Spain) Miguel Damas (qualified)

=== Qualifiers ===
1. (Spain) Miguel Damas
2. (Japan) Taro Daniel
3. (Argentina) Lautaro Midón
4. (Czech Republic) Martin Krumich

=== Qualifying draw ===
==== First qualifier ====
First round
1	(Denmark) Elmer Møller	3	4
(France) Thomas Faurel	6	6
WC	(Sweden) Nikola Slavic	4	1
8	(Spain) Miguel Damas	6	6

Qualifying competition
(France) Thomas Faurel	6	6^{6}	4
8	(Spain) Miguel Damas	3	7^{8}	6

==== Second qualifier ====
First round
2	(Spain) Roberto Carballés Baena	3	0^{r}
Alt	(Spain) Carlos Sánchez Jover	6	3
PR	(Argentina) Federico Coria	0	2
5	(Japan) Taro Daniel	6	6

Qualifying competition
Alt	(Spain) Carlos Sánchez Jover	2	6	2
5	(Japan) Taro Daniel	6	2	6

==== Third qualifier ====
First round
3	(Peru) Gonzalo Bueno	4	6^{5}
(Brazil) Igor Marcondes	6	7^{7}
WC	(Sweden) William Rejchtman Vinciguerra	6^{4}	3
6	(Argentina) Lautaro Midón	7^{7}	6

Qualifying competition
(Brazil) Igor Marcondes	6^{7}	5
6	(Argentina) Lautaro Midón	7^{9}	7

==== Fourth qualifier ====
First round
4	(Italy) Francesco Passaro	6	3	6
(Poland) Maks Kaśnikowski	1	6	3
(Czech Republic) Martin Krumich	6	6
7	(Portugal) Frederico Ferreira Silva	4	2

Qualifying competition
4	(Italy) Francesco Passaro	4	3
(Czech Republic) Martin Krumich	6	6
