= 2011 Swedish Open – Men's doubles =

Men's doubles
- 2011 Swedish Open

Final
- Champions: (Sweden) Robert Lindstedt (Romania) Horia Tecău
- Runners-up: (Sweden) Simon Aspelin (Sweden) Andreas Siljeström
- Score: 6–3, 6–3

Details
- Draw: 16
- Seeds: 4

Events
Singles	men	women
Doubles	men	women
- Swedish Open

Robert Lindstedt and Horia Tecău were the defending champions and they were able to retain their title, beating Simon Aspelin and Andreas Siljeström in the final, 6–3, 6–3.

The final was Aspelin's last professional tennis match, since he chose to retire after this tournament.

== Seeds ==
1. (Sweden) Robert Lindstedt / (Romania) Horia Tecău (champions)
2. (Czech Republic) František Čermák / (Slovakia) Filip Polášek (first round)
3. (France) Julien Benneteau / (United Kingdom) Jamie Murray (first round)
4. (Spain) David Marrero / (Spain) Rubén Ramírez Hidalgo (quarterfinals)

== Draw ==
Key

- Q = Qualifier
- WC = Wild card
- LL = Lucky loser
- Alt = Alternate
- ITF = ITF entry
- PR = Protected ranking
- SR = Special ranking
- SE = Special exempt
- JE = Junior exempt
- JR = Junior Accelerator Programme entrant
- CO = College Accelerator Programme entrant
- NG = Next Gen Accelerator Program entrant
- w/o = Walkover
- r = Retired
- d = Defaulted

=== Draw ===
First round
1	(Sweden) R Lindstedt (Romania) H Tecău	6	4	[10]
(Austria) J Knowle (Slovakia) I Zelenay	3	6	[8]
(Germany) D Brown (Germany) M Kohlmann	7^{7}	4	[10]
(United Kingdom) J Delgado (United Kingdom) J Marray	6^{1}	6	[8]
3	(France) J Benneteau (United Kingdom) J Murray	3	6^{4}
(Brazil) F Ferreiro (Brazil) A Sá	6	7^{7}
(Argentina) M González (Italy) P Starace	4	7^{7}	[10]
(Sweden) J Brunström (Denmark) F Nielsen	6	6^{4}	[6]
(Russia) M Elgin (Kazakhstan) M Kukushkin	6	6
(Kazakhstan) A Golubev (Italy) F Volandri	3	0
WC	(Sweden) C Bergman (Sweden) P Rosenholm	6^{5}	4
4	(Spain) D Marrero (Spain) R Ramírez Hidalgo	7^{7}	6
(Sweden) S Aspelin (Sweden) A Siljeström	6	6
WC	(Sweden) P Brydolf (Sweden) M Ryderstedt	2	4
(Slovenia) B Kavčič (Spain) P Riba	6	6
2	(Czech Republic) F Čermák (Slovakia) F Polášek	4	3

Quarterfinals
1	(Sweden) R Lindstedt (Romania) H Tecău	6	6
(Germany) D Brown (Germany) M Kohlmann	4	2
(Brazil) F Ferreiro (Brazil) A Sá	7	3	[10]
(Argentina) M González (Italy) P Starace	5	6	[6]
(Russia) M Elgin (Kazakhstan) M Kukushkin	6	7^{7}
4	(Spain) D Marrero (Spain) R Ramírez Hidalgo	3	6^{4}
(Sweden) S Aspelin (Sweden) A Siljeström	7	6
(Slovenia) B Kavčič (Spain) P Riba	5	4

Semifinals
1	(Sweden) R Lindstedt (Romania) H Tecău	6	6
(Brazil) F Ferreiro (Brazil) A Sá	2	3
(Russia) M Elgin (Kazakhstan) M Kukushkin	6	3	[11]
(Sweden) S Aspelin (Sweden) A Siljeström	3	6	[13]

Final
1	(Sweden) R Lindstedt (Romania) H Tecău	6	6
(Sweden) S Aspelin (Sweden) A Siljeström	3	3
