= 2026 Swedish Open – Women's doubles =

Women's doubles
- 2026 Swedish Open

Final
- Champions: (Colombia) Emiliana Arango (Switzerland) Simona Waltert
- Runners-up: (United Kingdom) Alicia Barnett (France) Elixane Lechemia
- Score: 6–4, 6–1

Events
| Singles | men | women |
| Doubles | men | women |
- Swedish Open

Jesika Malečková and Miriam Škoch were the reigning champions, but did not participate this year.

Emiliana Arango and Simona Waltert won the title, defeating Alicia Barnett and Elixane Lechemia 6–4, 6–1 in the final.

== Seeds ==
1. (United Kingdom) Emily Appleton / (Japan) Makoto Ninomiya (quarterfinals)
2. (India) Rutuja Bhosale / (Chinese Taipei) Li Yu-yun (quarterfinals)
3. (Switzerland) Naïma Karamoko / (Latvia) Darja Semeņistaja (quarterfinals)
4. (Belgium) Lara Salden / (Ukraine) Valeriya Strakhova (quarterfinals)

== Draw ==
Key

- Q = Qualifier
- WC = Wild card
- LL = Lucky loser
- Alt = Alternate
- ITF = ITF entry
- PR = Protected ranking
- SR = Special ranking
- SE = Special exempt
- JE = Junior exempt
- JR = Junior Accelerator Programme entrant
- CO = College Accelerator Programme entrant
- NG = Next Gen Accelerator Program entrant
- w/o = Walkover
- r = Retired
- d = Defaulted

=== Draw ===
First round
1 | (United Kingdom) E Appleton (Japan) M Ninomiya | 7^{7} | 6
(Sweden) C Hennemann (Sweden) L Zaar | 6^{3} | 3
(Colombia) E Arango (Switzerland) S Waltert | 6 | 3 | [10]
(Germany) N Noha Akugue (Bosnia and Herzegovina) A Wagner | 3 | 6 | [5]
3 | (Switzerland) N Karamoko (Latvia) D Semeņistaja | 2 | 6 | [10]
E Pridankina; E Yashina | 6 | 3 | [4]
(Japan) M Ayukawa (Japan) K Morisaki | 4 | 2
(Chinese Taipei) Y-h Lee (China) Q Ye | 6 | 6
(Sweden) L Bajraliu (Sweden) TT Deng | 6 | 1 | [12]
(Australia) G Da Silva-Fick (Australia) T McGiffin | 4 | 6 | [14]
(Czech Republic) A Kučmová (Czech Republic) A Laboutková | 3 | 1
4 | (Belgium) L Salden (Ukraine) V Strakhova | 6 | 6
(Spain) I Burillo (Spain) L Romero Gormaz | 2 | 4
(United Kingdom) A Barnett (France) E Lechemia | 6 | 6
(Japan) M Uchijima (United Kingdom) E Webley-Smith | 3 | 6 | [8]
2 | (India) R Bhosale (Chinese Taipei) Y-y Li | 6 | 1 | [10]

Quarterfinals
1 | (United Kingdom) E Appleton (Japan) M Ninomiya | 3 | 2
(Colombia) E Arango (Switzerland) S Waltert | 6 | 6
3 | (Switzerland) N Karamoko (Latvia) D Semeņistaja | 3 | 4
(Chinese Taipei) Y-h Lee (China) Q Ye | 6 | 6
(Australia) G Da Silva-Fick (Australia) T McGiffin | 6 | 6
4 | (Belgium) L Salden (Ukraine) V Strakhova | 3 | 1
(United Kingdom) A Barnett (France) E Lechemia | 6 | 6
2 | (India) R Bhosale (Chinese Taipei) Y-y Li | 3 | 2

Semifinals
(Colombia) E Arango (Switzerland) S Waltert | 6 | 6
(Chinese Taipei) Y-h Lee (China) Q Ye | 2 | 3
(Australia) G Da Silva-Fick (Australia) T McGiffin | 1 | 6^{2}
(United Kingdom) A Barnett (France) E Lechemia | 6 | 7^{7}

Final
(Colombia) E Arango (Switzerland) S Waltert | 6 | 6
(United Kingdom) A Barnett (France) E Lechemia | 4 | 1
