= 2026 Swedish Open =

- Date: 6–11 July (women); 13–19 July (men)
- Edition: 78th (men); 16th (women)
- Prize money: €612,620 (men) $115,000 (women)
- Surface: Clay / outdoor
- Venue: Båstad Tennis Stadium

Champions

Men's singles
- Andrey Rublev

Women's singles
- (Spain) Paula Badosa

Men's doubles
- (France) Sadio Doumbia / (France) Fabien Reboul

Women's doubles
- (Colombia) Emiliana Arango / (Switzerland) Simona Waltert
- Swedish Open

The 2026 Swedish Open (also known as the Nordea Open for sponsorship reasons) was a professional tennis tournament played on outdoor clay courts as part of the ATP Tour 250 Series of the 2026 ATP Tour and as part of the 2026 WTA 125 tournaments. It took place in Båstad, Sweden, from 6 through 11 July 2026 for the women's tournament, and from 13 through 19 July 2026 for the men's tournament. It was the 78th edition of the event for the men and the 16th edition for the women.

== Champions ==
=== Men's singles ===
- Andrey Rublev def. (Italy) Luciano Darderi, 6–4, 6–3

=== Women's singles ===
- (Spain) Paula Badosa def. (Switzerland) Simona Waltert 7–5, 7–5

=== Men's doubles ===
- (France) Sadio Doumbia / (France) Fabien Reboul def. (France) Théo Arribagé / (Portugal) Francisco Cabral, 6–3, 6–4

=== Women's doubles ===
- (Colombia) Emiliana Arango / (Switzerland) Simona Waltert def. (United Kingdom) Alicia Barnett / (France) Elixane Lechemia 6–4, 6–1

== ATP singles main-draw entrants ==
=== Seeds ===
Country	Player	Rank^{1}	Seed
	Andrey Rublev	13	1
ITA	Luciano Darderi	16	2
CHI	Alejandro Tabilo	33	3
ARG	Mariano Navone	38	4
POR	Nuno Borges	48	5
NED	Botic van de Zandschulp	54	6
ARG	Thiago Agustín Tirante	55	7
ARG	Sebastián Báez	57	8

- ^{1} Rankings are as of 29 June 2026.

=== Other entrants ===
The following players received wildcards into the main draw:

- (Sweden) Max Dahlin
- (Bulgaria) Grigor Dimitrov
- (France) Moïse Kouamé

The following players received entry from the qualifying draw:

- (Spain) Miguel Damas
- (Japan) Taro Daniel
- (Czech Republic) Martin Krumich
- (Argentina) Lautaro Midón

=== Withdrawals ===
- (Spain) Roberto Bautista Agut → replaced by (Argentina) Facundo Díaz Acosta
- (Hungary) Márton Fucsovics → replaced by (Georgia (country)) Nikoloz Basilashvili
- (United States) Patrick Kypson → replaced by (Austria) Sebastian Ofner
- (Australia) Alexei Popyrin → replaced by (Norway) Nicolai Budkov Kjær

== ATP doubles main-draw entrants ==
=== Seeds ===
Country	Player	Country	Player	Rank^{1}	Seed
FRA	Théo Arribagé	POR	Francisco Cabral	48	1
FRA	Sadio Doumbia	FRA	Fabien Reboul	61	2
NED	Sander Arends	NED	David Pel	72	3
GBR	Luke Johnson	POL	Jan Zieliński	79	4

- ^{1} Rankings are as of 29 June 2026.

=== Other entrants ===
The following pairs received wildcards into the doubles main draw:

- (Sweden) Erik Grevelius / (Sweden) Adam Heinonen
- (Sweden) Oliver Johansson / (Sweden) Nikola Slavic

=== Withdrawals ===
- (Uruguay) Ariel Behar / (Argentina) Thiago Agustín Tirante → not replaced

== WTA singles main-draw entrants ==
=== Seeds ===
Country	Player	Rank^{1}	Seed
UKR	Oleksandra Oliynykova	53	1
GER	Tamara Korpatsch	78	2
KAZ	Yulia Putintseva	84	3
SUI	Simona Waltert	90	4
AUT	Sinja Kraus	93	5
COL	Emiliana Arango	97	6
LAT	Darja Semeņistaja	104	7
ESP	Kaitlin Quevedo	107	8

- ^{1} Rankings are as of 29 June 2026.

=== Other entrants ===
The following players received wildcards into the main draw:

- (Sweden) Linea Bajraliu
- (Sweden) Grace Bernstein
- (Sweden) June Björk
- (Sweden) Tiana Tian Deng

=== Withdrawals ===
Before the tournament

- Alina Charaeva → replaced by (Spain) Irene Burillo
- (Italy) Tyra Caterina Grant → replaced by (Czech Republic) Aneta Laboutková
- (Slovenia) Kaja Juvan → replaced by (Romania) Miriam Bulgaru
- (Netherlands) Anouk Koevermans → replaced by (Sweden) Caijsa Hennemann
- (Netherlands) Suzan Lamens → replaced by (Sweden) Kajsa Rinaldo Persson
- (Romania) Elena-Gabriela Ruse → replaced by (Sweden) Lea Nilsson
- (Ukraine) Yuliia Starodubtseva → replaced by (Sweden) Lisa Zaar
- (Uzbekistan) Maria Timofeeva → replaced by (Ukraine) Valeriya Strakhova
- (Mexico) Renata Zarazúa → replaced by (Greece) Martha Matoula

== WTA doubles main-draw entrants ==
=== Seeds ===
Country	Player	Country	Player	Rank^{1}	Seed
GBR	Emily Appleton	JPN	Makoto Ninomiya	174	1
IND	Rutuja Bhosale	TPE	Li Yu-yun	261	2
SUI	Naïma Karamoko	LAT	Darja Semeņistaja	267	3
BEL	Lara Salden	UKR	Valeriya Strakhova	280	4

- ^{1} Rankings are as of 29 June 2026.
