= 2013 Swedish Open =

- Date: 6–14 July (men); 13–21 July (women)
- Edition: 66th (men); 5th (women)
- Surface: Clay / outdoor

Champions

Men's singles
- (Argentina) Carlos Berlocq

Women's singles
- (United States) Serena Williams

Men's doubles
- (United States) Nicholas Monroe / (Germany) Simon Stadler

Women's doubles
- (Spain) Anabel Medina Garrigues / (Czech Republic) Klára Zakopalová
← 2012 ·	Swedish Open	· 2014 →

The 2013 Swedish Open was a tennis tournament played on outdoor clay courts as part of the ATP World Tour 250 Series of the 2013 ATP World Tour and as part of the International Series on the 2013 WTA Tour. It took place in Båstad, Sweden, from 6 July until 14 July 2013 for the men's tournament and from 13 July until 21 July 2013 for the women's tournament. It was also known as the 2013 SkiStar Swedish Open for the men's and the 2013 Collector Swedish Open for the women's for sponsorship reasons. It was the 66th edition for the Men's and the 5th edition for the Women's.

== Finals ==
=== Men's singles ===
- (Argentina) Carlos Berlocq defeated (Spain) Fernando Verdasco, 7–5, 6–1

=== Women's singles ===
- (United States) Serena Williams defeated (Sweden) Johanna Larsson, 6–4, 6–1

=== Men's doubles ===
- (United States) Nicholas Monroe / (Germany) Simon Stadler defeated (Argentina) Carlos Berlocq / (Spain) Albert Ramos, 6–2, 3–6, [10–3]

=== Women's doubles ===
- (Spain) Anabel Medina Garrigues / (Czech Republic) Klára Zakopalová defeated (Romania) Alexandra Dulgheru / (Italy) Flavia Pennetta, 6–1, 6–4

== ATP singles main draw entrants ==
=== Seeds ===
Country	Player	Rank^{1}	Seed
CZE	Tomáš Berdych	6	1
ESP	Nicolás Almagro	16	2
ARG	Juan Mónaco	20	3
ESP	Tommy Robredo	29	4
BUL	Grigor Dimitrov	31	5
SRB	Viktor Troicki	44	6
ARG	Horacio Zeballos	52	7
ESP	Fernando Verdasco	54	8

- ^{1} Rankings are as of June 24, 2013

=== Other entrants ===
The following players received wildcards into the singles main draw:

- (Sweden) Markus Eriksson
- (Sweden) Andreas Vinciguerra
- (Sweden) Elias Ymer

The following players received entry from the qualifying draw:

- (Switzerland) Henri Laaksonen
- (Germany) Julian Reister
- (Argentina) Diego Sebastián Schwartzman
- (Croatia) Antonio Veić

The following players received entry as lucky loser:

- (Romania) Marius Copil

=== Withdrawals ===
Before the tournament

- (Italy) Simone Bolelli
- (Brazil) Rogério Dutra da Silva
- (Spain) David Ferrer (ankle injury)
- (Poland) Jerzy Janowicz
- (Italy) Paolo Lorenzi (ankle injury)
- (Argentina) Guido Pella

== ATP doubles main draw entrants ==
=== Seeds ===
Country	Player	Country	Player	Rank^{1}	Seed
SWE	Robert Lindstedt	CAN	Daniel Nestor	27	1
ESP	David Marrero	ESP	Fernando Verdasco	36	2
ITA	Daniele Bracciali	CZE	František Čermák	77	3
SWE	Johan Brunström	RSA	Raven Klaasen	109	4

- Rankings are as of June 24, 2013

=== Other entrants ===
The following pairs received wildcards into the doubles main draw:

- (Sweden) Isak Arvidsson / (Finland) Micke Kontinen
- (Bulgaria) Grigor Dimitrov / (Sweden) Mikael Tillström

The following pair received entry as alternates:

- (Netherlands) Thiemo de Bakker / (Australia) Rameez Junaid

=== Withdrawals ===
Before the tournament

- (Italy) Paolo Lorenzi (ankle injury)

== WTA singles main draw entrants ==
=== Seeds ===
Country	Player	Rank^{1}	Seed
USA	Serena Williams	1	1
ROU	Simona Halep	30	2
CZE	Klára Zakopalová	42	3
BUL	Tsvetana Pironkova	57	4
ESP	Lourdes Domínguez Lino	58	5
UKR	Lesia Tsurenko	61	6
ESP	Sílvia Soler Espinosa	75	7
SWE	Johanna Larsson	77	8

- ^{1} Rankings are as of July 8, 2013

=== Other entrants ===
The following players received wildcards into the singles main draw:

- (Switzerland) Belinda Bencic
- (Sweden) Ellen Allgurin
- (Sweden) Rebecca Peterson

The following players received entry from the qualifying draw:

- (Venezuela) Andrea Gámiz
- (Italy) Anastasia Grymalska
- (Netherlands) Richèl Hogenkamp
- (Netherlands) Lesley Kerkhove

=== Withdrawals ===
Before the tournament

- (United States) Alexa Glatch
- (Estonia) Kaia Kanepi
- (Slovakia) Magdaléna Rybáriková
- (Kazakhstan) Yaroslava Shvedova
- (United States) Venus Williams

=== Retirements ===
- (Romania) Simona Halep (back injury)

== WTA doubles main draw entrants ==
=== Seeds ===
Country	Player	Country	Player	Rank^{1}	Seed
ESP	Anabel Medina Garrigues	CZE	Klára Zakopalová	122	1
ESP	Arantxa Parra Santonja	ESP	Sílvia Soler Espinosa	123	2
RUS	Alla Kudryavtseva	UKR	Olga Savchuk	162	3
UKR	Irina Buryachok	GEO	Anna Tatishvili	207	4

- ^{1} Rankings are as of July 8, 2013

=== Other entrants ===
The following pairs received wildcards into the doubles main draw:

- (Sweden) Ellen Allgurin / (Sweden) Rebecca Peterson
- (Sweden) Jacqueline Cabaj Awad / (Sweden) Cornelia Lister
