= 2013 Swedish Open – Women's singles =

Women's singles
- 2013 Swedish Open

Final
- Champion: (United States) Serena Williams
- Runner-up: (Sweden) Johanna Larsson
- Score: 6–4, 6–1

Details
- Draw: 32
- Seeds: 8

Events
Singles	men	women
Doubles	men	women
- Swedish Open

Polona Hercog was the two-time defending champion, but decided to compete at an ITF $100,000 event at Olomouc instead.

World No. 1 Serena Williams and top-seed won the title, defeating Johanna Larsson in the final in straight sets.

The win in the final was Williams' last 28th match on clay, marked she was being undefeated on clay courts during 2013 season.

== Seeds ==
1. (United States) Serena Williams (champion)
2. (Romania) Simona Halep (second round, retired)
3. (Czech Republic) Klára Zakopalová (semifinals)
4. (Bulgaria) Tsvetana Pironkova (first round)
5. (Spain) Lourdes Domínguez Lino (quarterfinals)
6. (Ukraine) Lesia Tsurenko (second round)
7. (Spain) Silvia Soler Espinosa (first round)
8. (Sweden) Johanna Larsson (final)

== Draw ==
Key

- Q = Qualifier
- WC = Wild card
- LL = Lucky loser
- Alt = Alternate
- ITF = ITF entry
- PR = Protected ranking
- SR = Special ranking
- SE = Special exempt
- JE = Junior exempt
- JR = Junior Accelerator Programme entrant
- CO = College Accelerator Programme entrant
- NG = Next Gen Accelerator Program entrant
- w/o = Walkover
- r = Retired
- d = Defaulted

=== Finals ===
Semifinals
1	(United States) Serena Williams	6	6
3	(Czech Republic) Klára Zakopalová	0	4
8	(Sweden) Johanna Larsson	2	6	6
(Italy) Flavia Pennetta	6	3	4

Final
1	(United States) Serena Williams	6	6
8	(Sweden) Johanna Larsson	4	1

=== Top half ===
First round
1	(United States) S Williams	6	6
(Kazakhstan) S Karatantcheva	1	2
(Georgia (country)) A Tatishvili	2	6	6
WC	(Switzerland) B Bencic	6	4	4
(Brazil) T Pereira	3	6	7
(Germany) D Pfizenmaier	6	2	5
(Spain) A Medina Garrigues	1	2
5	(Spain) L Domínguez Lino	6	6
3	(Czech Republic) K Zakopalová	6	6
WC	(Sweden) E Allgurin	1	1
(Spain) A Parra Santonja	2	6	7
(Russia) A Kudryavtseva	6	4	5
Q	(Netherlands) R Hogenkamp	6	6
(Spain) L Arruabarrena	3	3
Q	(Italy) A Grymalska	3	7	1
6	(Ukraine) L Tsurenko	6	5	6

Second round
1	(United States) S Williams	6	6
(Georgia (country)) A Tatishvili	2	3
(Brazil) T Pereira	6	4	3
5	(Spain) L Domínguez Lino	3	6	6
3	(Czech Republic) K Zakopalová	6	6
(Spain) A Parra Santonja	3	1
Q	(Netherlands) R Hogenkamp	6	2	6
6	(Ukraine) L Tsurenko	1	6	3

Quarterfinals
1	(United States) S Williams	6	6
5	(Spain) L Domínguez Lino	1	1
3	(Czech Republic) K Zakopalová	6	6
Q	(Netherlands) R Hogenkamp	2	3

Semifinals
1	(United States) S Williams	6	6
3	(Czech Republic) K Zakopalová	0	4

=== Bottom half ===
First round
8	(Sweden) J Larsson	6	6
(Sweden) S Arvidsson	1	1
Q	(Netherlands) L Kerkhove	3	1
(Russia) N Bratchikova	6	6
(United States) J Cohen	2	3
(France) M Johansson	6	6
Q	(Venezuela) A Gámiz	6	6
4	(Bulgaria) T Pironkova	1	3
7	(Spain) S Soler Espinosa	5	1
(France) V Razzano	7	6
(France) C Garcia	6^{4}	1
PR	(Romania) A Dulgheru	7^{7}	6
(Italy) F Pennetta	6	4	6
(Colombia) M Duque Mariño	1	6	4
WC	(Sweden) R Peterson	4	0
2	(Romania) S Halep	6	6

Second round
8	(Sweden) J Larsson	6	6
(Russia) N Bratchikova	2	3
(France) M Johansson	7	6
Q	(Venezuela) A Gámiz	5	2
(France) V Razzano	3	6	6
PR	(Romania) A Dulgheru	6	0	4
(Italy) F Pennetta	4	7	2
2	(Romania) S Halep	6	5	0^{r}

Quarterfinals
8	(Sweden) J Larsson	6	6
(France) M Johansson	1	2
(France) V Razzano	1	3
(Italy) F Pennetta	6	6

Semifinals
8	(Sweden) J Larsson	2	6	6
(Italy) F Pennetta	6	3	4

== Qualifying ==
=== Seeds ===
1. (France) Alizé Lim (withdrew)
2. (Latvia) Diāna Marcinkēviča (second round)
3. (Italy) Alberta Brianti (qualifying competition)
4. (Italy) Anastasia Grymalska (qualified)
5. (Netherlands) Richèl Hogenkamp (qualified)
6. (Ukraine) Tetyana Arefyeva (second round)
7. (Venezuela) Andrea Gámiz (qualified)
8. (Russia) Marina Melnikova (qualifying competition)
9. (Netherlands) Lesley Kerkhove (qualified)

=== Qualifiers ===
1. (Netherlands) Lesley Kerkhove
2. (Venezuela) Andrea Gámiz
3. (Netherlands) Richèl Hogenkamp
4. (Italy) Anastasia Grymalska

=== Qualifying draw ===
==== First qualifier ====
First round
9	(Netherlands) Lesley Kerkhove	6	3	6
(Belgium) Ysaline Bonaventure	0	6	2
(Georgia (country)) Margalita Chakhnashvili	1	1
(Spain) Sara Sorribes Tormo	6	6
WC	(Sweden) Susanne Celik	1	6	2
WC	(Sweden) Cornelia Lister	6	4	6
(Poland) Justyna Jegiołka	1	7	4
8	(Russia) Marina Melnikova	6	5	6

Second round
9	(Netherlands) Lesley Kerkhove	6	0	6
(Spain) Sara Sorribes Tormo	3	6	3
WC	(Sweden) Cornelia Lister	2	3
8	(Russia) Marina Melnikova	6	6

Qualifying competition
9	(Netherlands) Lesley Kerkhove	7^{9}	6
8	(Russia) Marina Melnikova	6^{7}	4

==== Second qualifier ====
First round
2	(Latvia) Diāna Marcinkēviča	6	6
(Sweden) Matilda Hamlin	3	3
(Russia) Varvara Flink	3	2
(Austria) Nicole Rottmann	6	6
(Australia) Karolina Wlodarczak	2	5
(Ukraine) Olga Ianchuk	6	7
WC	(Sweden) Louise Brunskog	1	4
7	(Venezuela) Andrea Gámiz	6	6

Second round
2	(Latvia) Diāna Marcinkēviča	3	6^{6}
(Austria) Nicole Rottmann	6	7^{8}
(Ukraine) Olga Ianchuk	2	5
7	(Venezuela) Andrea Gámiz	6	7

Qualifying competition
(Austria) Nicole Rottmann	4	3
7	(Venezuela) Andrea Gámiz	6	6

==== Third qualifier ====
First round
3	(Italy) Alberta Brianti	7^{7}	2	6
(Kyrgyzstan) Ksenia Palkina	6^{4}	6	0
WC	(Sweden) Emma Ek	0	1
(Germany) Justine Ozga	6	6
(Ukraine) Irina Buryachok	6	6
WC	(Sweden) Kajsa Rinaldo Persson	4	3
WC	(Sweden) Donika Bashota	4	4
5	(Netherlands) Richèl Hogenkamp	6	6

Second round
3	(Italy) Alberta Brianti	6	6
(Germany) Justine Ozga	3	2
(Ukraine) Irina Buryachok	4	1
5	(Netherlands) Richèl Hogenkamp	6	6

Qualifying competition
3	(Italy) Alberta Brianti	2	2
5	(Netherlands) Richèl Hogenkamp	6	6

==== Fourth qualifier ====
First round
4	(Italy) Anastasia Grymalska	4	6	6
(Sweden) Sandra Roma	6	1	1
WC	(Sweden) Beatrice Cedermark	2	3
(Sweden) Hilda Melander	6	6
(Czech Republic) Tereza Martincová	6	6
WC	(Sweden) Paulina Wulcan	1	1
WC	(Sweden) Jacqueline Cabaj Awad	2	5
6	(Ukraine) Tetyana Arefyeva	6	7

Second round
4	(Italy) Anastasia Grymalska	7	6
(Sweden) Hilda Melander	5	1
(Czech Republic) Tereza Martincová	7	6
6	(Ukraine) Tetyana Arefyeva	5	2

Qualifying competition
4	(Italy) Anastasia Grymalska	6	6
(Czech Republic) Tereza Martincová	3	2
