= 2013 Swedish Open – Men's doubles =

Men's doubles
- 2013 Swedish Open

Final
- Champions: (United States) Nicholas Monroe (Germany) Simon Stadler
- Runners-up: (Argentina) Carlos Berlocq (Spain) Albert Ramos
- Score: 6–2, 3–6, [10–3]

Details
- Draw: 16
- Seeds: 4

Events
Singles	men	women
Doubles	men	women
- Swedish Open

Robert Lindstedt and Horia Tecău were the three-time defending champions, but chose not to compete together. Tecău teamed up with Marius Copil, but they lost in the first round to Jan Hájek and Filip Polášek. Lindstedt played alongside Daniel Nestor, but they lost in the second round to Nicholas Monroe and Simon Stadler.
Monroe and Stadler went on to win the title, defeating Carlos Berlocq and Albert Ramos in the final, 6–2, 3–6, [10–3]

== Seeds ==
1. (Sweden) Robert Lindstedt / (Canada) Daniel Nestor (quarterfinals)
2. (Spain) David Marrero / (Spain) Fernando Verdasco (quarterfinals)
3. (Italy) Daniele Bracciali / (Czech Republic) František Čermák (first round)
4. (Sweden) Johan Brunström / (South Africa) Raven Klaasen (semifinals)

== Draw ==
Key

- Q = Qualifier
- WC = Wild card
- LL = Lucky loser
- Alt = Alternate
- ITF = ITF entry
- PR = Protected ranking
- SR = Special ranking
- SE = Special exempt
- JE = Junior exempt
- JR = Junior Accelerator Programme entrant
- CO = College Accelerator Programme entrant
- NG = Next Gen Accelerator Program entrant
- w/o = Walkover
- r = Retired
- d = Defaulted

=== Draw ===
First round
1	(Sweden) R Lindstedt (Canada) D Nestor	6	7
(Ukraine) S Stakhovsky (Serbia) V Troicki	4	5
Alt	(Netherlands) T de Bakker (Australia) R Junaid	2	2
(United States) N Monroe (Germany) S Stadler	6	6
3	(Italy) D Bracciali (Czech Republic) F Čermák	2	6	[6]
PR	(Argentina) L Arnold Ker (Argentina) J Mónaco	6	3	[10]
(Argentina) M Alund (Brazil) J Souza	6	7^{7}
WC	(Sweden) I Arvidsson (Finland) M Kontinen	4	6^{5}
(Romania) M Copil (Romania) H Tecău	5	3
(Czech Republic) J Hájek (Slovakia) F Polášek	7	6
WC	(Bulgaria) G Dimitrov (Sweden) M Tillström	6	3	[4]
4	(Sweden) J Brunström (South Africa) R Klaasen	1	6	[10]
(Russia) M Elgin (Germany) P Marx	4	6	[7]
(Argentina) C Berlocq (Spain) A Ramos	6	1	[10]
(Spain) G García-López (Argentina) H Zeballos	6^{4}	3
2	(Spain) D Marrero (Spain) F Verdasco	7^{7}	6

Quarterfinals
1	(Sweden) R Lindstedt (Canada) D Nestor	4	3
(United States) N Monroe (Germany) S Stadler	6	6
PR	(Argentina) L Arnold Ker (Argentina) J Mónaco	6	6
(Argentina) M Alund (Brazil) J Souza	3	2
(Czech Republic) J Hájek (Slovakia) F Polášek	4	3
4	(Sweden) J Brunström (South Africa) R Klaasen	6	6
(Argentina) C Berlocq (Spain) A Ramos	3	7^{7}	[10]
2	(Spain) D Marrero (Spain) F Verdasco	6	6^{3}	[4]

Semifinals
(United States) N Monroe (Germany) S Stadler	6	7^{7}
PR	(Argentina) L Arnold Ker (Argentina) J Mónaco	2	6^{3}
4	(Sweden) J Brunström (South Africa) R Klaasen	4	3
(Argentina) C Berlocq (Spain) A Ramos	6	6

Final
(United States) N Monroe (Germany) S Stadler	6	3	[10]
(Argentina) C Berlocq (Spain) A Ramos	2	6	[3]
