= 2026 Swedish Open – Men's doubles =

Men's doubles
- 2026 Swedish Open

Final
- Champions: (France) Sadio Doumbia (France) Fabien Reboul
- Runners-up: (France) Théo Arribagé (Portugal) Francisco Cabral
- Score: 6–3, 6–4

Events
| Singles | men | women |
| Doubles | men | women |
- Swedish Open

Sadio Doumbia and Fabien Reboul defeated Théo Arribagé and Francisco Cabral in the final, 6–3, 6–4 to win the men's doubles tennis title at the 2026 Swedish Open.

Guido Andreozzi and Sander Arends were the reigning champions, but Andreozzi did not participate this year. Arends partnered David Pel, but lost in the quarterfinals to Jean-Julien Rojer and Theodore Winegar.

== Seeds ==
1. (France) Théo Arribagé / (Portugal) Francisco Cabral (final)
2. (France) Sadio Doumbia / (France) Fabien Reboul (champions)
3. (Netherlands) Sander Arends / (Netherlands) David Pel (quarterfinals)
4. (United Kingdom) Luke Johnson / (Poland) Jan Zieliński (first round)

== Draw ==
Key

- Q = Qualifier
- WC = Wild card
- LL = Lucky loser
- Alt = Alternate
- ITF = ITF entry
- PR = Protected ranking
- SR = Special ranking
- SE = Special exempt
- JE = Junior exempt
- JR = Junior Accelerator Programme entrant
- CO = College Accelerator Programme entrant
- NG = Next Gen Accelerator Program entrant
- w/o = Walkover
- r = Retired
- d = Defaulted

=== Draw ===
First round
1 | (France) T Arribagé (Portugal) F Cabral | 7 | 6
WC | (Sweden) E Grevelius (Sweden) A Heinonen | 5 | 4
(Ecuador) D Hidalgo (Chile) A Tabilo | 3 | 6^{4}
(United Kingdom) J Paris (Paraguay) AD Vallejo | 6 | 7^{7}
4 | (United Kingdom) L Johnson (Poland) J Zieliński | 7^{7} | 1 | [8]
(Italy) A Pellegrino (Italy) A Vavassori | 6^{3} | 6 | [10]
(United States) V Kirkov (Netherlands) B Stevens | 3 | 6 | [10]
(India) S Balaji (Sweden) A Göransson | 6 | 4 | [7]
(Poland) K Drzewiecki (Poland) F Pieczonka | 3 | 4
(Netherlands) J-J Rojer (United States) T Winegar | 6 | 6
(Brazil) O Luz (Brazil) R Matos | 6 | 3 | [6]
3 | (Netherlands) S Arends (Netherlands) D Pel | 4 | 6 | [10]
(United States) M Kiger (United States) R Stalder | 0 | 5
2 | (France) S Doumbia (France) F Reboul | 6 | 7

Quarterfinals
1 | (France) T Arribagé (Portugal) F Cabral | 2 | 6 | [10]
(United Kingdom) J Paris (Paraguay) AD Vallejo | 6 | 3 | [4]
(Italy) A Pellegrino (Italy) A Vavassori | 7 | 3 | [8]
(United States) V Kirkov (Netherlands) B Stevens | 5 | 6 | [10]
(Netherlands) J-J Rojer (United States) T Winegar | 6 | 2 | [10]
3 | (Netherlands) S Arends (Netherlands) D Pel | 3 | 6 | [5]
WC | (Sweden) O Johansson (Sweden) N Slavic | 2 | 3
2 | (France) S Doumbia (France) F Reboul | 6 | 6

Semifinals
1 | (France) T Arribagé (Portugal) F Cabral | 6 | 6
(United States) V Kirkov (Netherlands) B Stevens | 3 | 2
(Netherlands) J-J Rojer (United States) T Winegar | 4 | 7^{7} | [9]
2 | (France) S Doumbia (France) F Reboul | 6 | 6^{5} | [11]

Final
1 | (France) T Arribagé (Portugal) F Cabral | 3 | 4
2 | (France) S Doumbia (France) F Reboul | 6 | 6
