= 2011 Swedish Open – Women's doubles =

Women's doubles
- 2011 Swedish Open

Final
- Champions: (Spain) Lourdes Domínguez Lino (Spain) María José Martínez Sánchez
- Runners-up: (Spain) Nuria Llagostera Vives (Spain) Arantxa Parra Santonja
- Score: 6–3, 6–3

Details
- Draw: 16
- Seeds: 4

Events
Singles	men	women
Doubles	men	women
- Swedish Open

Gisela Dulko and Flavia Pennetta were the defending champions but decided not to participate.

Lourdes Domínguez Lino and María José Martínez Sánchez won the tournament beating Nuria Llagostera Vives and Arantxa Parra Santonja in an all Spanish final, 6–3, 6–3.

== Seeds ==
1. (Czech Republic) Iveta Benešová / (Czech Republic) Barbora Záhlavová-Strýcová (quarterfinals, withdrew)
2. (Uzbekistan) Akgul Amanmuradova / (Czech Republic) Andrea Hlaváčková (first round)
3. (Spain) Nuria Llagostera Vives / (Spain) Arantxa Parra Santonja (final)
4. (Russia) Vera Dushevina / (Russia) Alla Kudryavtseva (semifinals)

== Draw ==
Key

- Q = Qualifier
- WC = Wild card
- LL = Lucky loser
- Alt = Alternate
- ITF = ITF entry
- PR = Protected ranking
- SR = Special ranking
- SE = Special exempt
- JE = Junior exempt
- JR = Junior Accelerator Programme entrant
- CO = College Accelerator Programme entrant
- NG = Next Gen Accelerator Program entrant
- w/o = Walkover
- r = Retired
- d = Defaulted

=== Draw ===
First round
1	(Czech Republic) I Benešová (Czech Republic) B Záhlavová-Strýcová	6	6
(United States) J Craybas (France) A Rezaï	3	2
(Spain) L Domínguez Lino (Spain) MJ Martínez Sánchez	6	6
(Bosnia and Herzegovina) M Jugić-Salkić (Finland) E Laine	4	4
4	(Russia) V Dushevina (Russia) A Kudryavtseva	7	7
(United States) A Weinhold (Slovakia) L Wienerová	5	5
WC	(Sweden) A Brazhnikova (Sweden) H Melander	2	6^{3}
(France) S Beltrame (Russia) V Savinykh	6	7
(Greece) E Daniilidou (Slovenia) P Hercog	6	6
(Russia) E Bovina (Latvia) L Dekmeijere	2	2
(Netherlands) A Rus (Belarus) A Yakimova	2	6	[3]
3	(Spain) N Llagostera Vives (Spain) A Parra Santonja	6	1	[10]
(Sweden) S Arvidsson (Sweden) J Larsson	1	2
(Russia) V Dolonts (Georgia (country)) A Tatishvili	6	6
(Romania) S Cîrstea (Czech Republic) L Šafářová	1	6	[11]
2	(Uzbekistan) A Amanmuradova (Czech Republic) A Hlaváčková	6	4	[9]

Quarterfinals
1	(Czech Republic) I Benešová (Czech Republic) B Záhlavová-Strýcová
(Spain) L Domínguez Lino (Spain) MJ Martínez Sánchez	w/o
4	(Russia) V Dushevina (Russia) A Kudryavtseva	7	7
(France) S Beltrame (Russia) V Savinykh	5	5
(Greece) E Daniilidou (Slovenia) P Hercog	4	6	[5]
3	(Spain) N Llagostera Vives (Spain) A Parra Santonja	6	4	[10]
(Russia) V Dolonts (Georgia (country)) A Tatishvili	6	6
(Romania) S Cîrstea (Czech Republic) L Šafářová	2	3

Semifinals
(Spain) L Domínguez Lino (Spain) MJ Martínez Sánchez	6	6
4	(Russia) V Dushevina (Russia) A Kudryavtseva	3	2
3	(Spain) N Llagostera Vives (Spain) A Parra Santonja	7^{8}	6
(Russia) V Dolonts (Georgia (country)) A Tatishvili	6^{6}	1

Final
(Spain) L Domínguez Lino (Spain) MJ Martínez Sánchez	6	6
3	(Spain) N Llagostera Vives (Spain) A Parra Santonja	3	3
