= 2010 Swedish Open – Women's singles =

Women's singles
- 2010 Swedish Open

Final
- Champion: (France) Aravane Rezaï
- Runner-up: (Argentina) Gisela Dulko
- Score: 6–3, 4–6, 6–4

Details
- Draw: 32
- Seeds: 8

Events
Singles	men	women
Doubles	men	women
- Swedish Open

María José Martínez Sánchez was the defender of title, but withdrew due to a knee injury.
Second-seeded Aravane Rezaï became the new champion, after she won in the final 6–3, 4–6, 6–4, against Gisela Dulko.

== Seeds ==
1. (Italy) Flavia Pennetta (semifinals)
2. (France) Aravane Rezaï (champion)
3. (Czech Republic) Lucie Šafářová (semifinals)
4. (Argentina) Gisela Dulko (final)
5. (Spain) Arantxa Parra Santonja (quarterfinals)
6. (Germany) Angelique Kerber (first round, Retired)
7. (Sweden) Sofia Arvidsson (first round)
8. (Czech Republic) Barbora Záhlavová-Strýcová (quarterfinals)

== Draw ==
Key

- Q = Qualifier
- WC = Wild card
- LL = Lucky loser
- Alt = Alternate
- ITF = ITF entry
- PR = Protected ranking
- SR = Special ranking
- SE = Special exempt
- JE = Junior exempt
- JR = Junior Accelerator Programme entrant
- CO = College Accelerator Programme entrant
- NG = Next Gen Accelerator Program entrant
- w/o = Walkover
- r = Retired
- d = Defaulted

=== Finals ===
Semifinals
1	(Italy) Flavia Pennetta	3	1
4	(Argentina) Gisela Dulko	6	6
3	(Czech Republic) Lucie Šafářová	3	3
2	(France) Aravane Rezaï	6	6

Final
4	(Argentina) Gisela Dulko	3	6	4
2	(France) Aravane Rezaï	6	4	6

=== Top half ===
First round
1	(Italy) F Pennetta	6	6
WC	(Sweden) A Brazhnikova	2	0
(Italy) A Brianti	2	4
WC	(United States) S Stephens	6	6
(United States) J Craybas	6	6
(Paraguay) R de los Ríos	3	3
(Germany) A-L Grönefeld	6	6
7	(Sweden) S Arvidsson	2	4
4	(Argentina) G Dulko	6	6
WC	(Sweden) E Allgurin	1	3
(Germany) T Malek	5	6	6
(Australia) A Rodionova	7	3	1
Q	(Germany) L Siegemund	2	3
(Netherlands) A Rus	6	6
Q	(Croatia) A Vrljić	5	7	3
6	(Germany) A Kerber	7	5	0^{r}

Second round
1	(Italy) F Pennetta	6	6
WC	(United States) S Stephens	1	1
(United States) J Craybas	3	6	6
(Germany) A-L Grönefeld	6	0	4
4	(Argentina) G Dulko	6	1	7
(Germany) T Malek	2	6	6^{1}
(Netherlands) A Rus	5	7	4
Q	(Croatia) A Vrljić	7	5	6

Quarterfinals
1	(Italy) F Pennetta	6	6
(United States) J Craybas	4	4
4	(Argentina) G Dulko	5
Q	(Croatia) A Vrljić	0	r

Semifinals
1	(Italy) F Pennetta	3	1
4	(Argentina) G Dulko	6	6

=== Bottom half ===
First round
8	(Czech Republic) B Záhlavová-Strýcová	6	6
(Slovakia) Z Kučová	3	0
(Uzbekistan) A Amanmuradova	6^{5}	6	6
(Colombia) M Duque Mariño	7	4	0
(Croatia) K Šprem	7	6
(Italy) ME Camerin	5	2
Q	(Germany) K Wörle	2	0
3	(Czech Republic) L Šafářová	6	6
5	(Spain) A Parra Santonja	6	7
(Estonia) K Kanepi	4	5
(Slovenia) M Zec Peškirič	0	5
Q	(Spain) N Llagostera Vives	6	7
(Sweden) J Larsson	3	6	4
(Czech Republic) R Voráčová	6	2	6
(United States) L Osterloh	4	2
2	(France) A Rezaï	6	6

Second round
8	(Czech Republic) B Záhlavová-Strýcová	3	6	6
(Uzbekistan) A Amanmuradova	6	4	0
(Croatia) K Šprem	6	5	3
3	(Czech Republic) L Šafářová	2	7	6
5	(Spain) A Parra Santonja	6	6
Q	(Spain) N Llagostera Vives	4	3
(Czech Republic) R Voráčová	4	2
2	(France) A Rezaï	6	6

Quarterfinals
8	(Czech Republic) B Záhlavová-Strýcová	4	6^{4}
3	(Czech Republic) L Šafářová	6	7
5	(Spain) A Parra Santonja	1	4
2	(France) A Rezaï	6	6

Semifinals
3	(Czech Republic) L Šafářová	3	3
2	(France) A Rezaï	6	6
