= 2026 Swedish Open – Women's singles =

Women's singles
- 2026 Swedish Open

Final
- Champion: (Spain) Paula Badosa
- Runner-up: (Switzerland) Simona Waltert
- Score: 7–5, 7–5

Details
- Draw: 32
- Seeds: 8

Events
Singles	men	women
Doubles	men	women
- Swedish Open

Paula Badosa won the title, defeating Simona Waltert 7–5, 7–5 in the final. It was her first title in almost two years, since the 2024 Washington Open.

Elisabetta Cocciaretto was the reigning champion, but did not participate this year.

== Seeds ==
1. (Ukraine) Oleksandra Oliynykova (first round)
2. (Germany) Tamara Korpatsch (second round)
3. (Kazakhstan) Yulia Putintseva (semifinals)
4. (Switzerland) Simona Waltert (final)
5. (Austria) Sinja Kraus (quarterfinals)
6. (Colombia) Emiliana Arango (second round)
7. (Latvia) Darja Semeņistaja (first round)
8. (Spain) Kaitlin Quevedo (semifinals)

== Draw ==
Key

- Q = Qualifier
- WC = Wild card
- LL = Lucky loser
- Alt = Alternate
- ITF = ITF entry
- PR = Protected ranking
- SR = Special ranking
- SE = Special exempt
- JE = Junior exempt
- JR = Junior Accelerator Programme entrant
- CO = College Accelerator Programme entrant
- NG = Next Gen Accelerator Program entrant
- w/o = Walkover
- r = Retired
- d = Defaulted

=== Finals ===
Semifinals
8	(Spain) Kaitlin Quevedo	5	2
4	(Switzerland) Simona Waltert	7	6
3	(Kazakhstan) Yulia Putintseva	1	2
(Spain) Paula Badosa	6	6

Final
4	(Switzerland) Simona Waltert	5	5
(Spain) Paula Badosa	7	7

=== Top half ===
First round
1	(Ukraine) O Oliynykova	7	2	5
(Japan) M Uchijima	5	6	7
(Germany) N Noha Akugue	5	6	2
(Spain) I Burillo	7	2	6
(Hungary) D Gálfi	4	6^{4}
(Sweden) K Rinaldo Persson	6	7^{7}
WC	(Sweden) TT Deng	2	3
8	(Spain) K Quevedo	6	6
4	(Switzerland) S Waltert	6	6
(Poland) K Kawa	4	1
(Czech Republic) A Laboutková	6	6
WC	(Sweden) G Bernstein	1	1
(Romania) M Bulgaru	6	6
(Ukraine) V Strakhova	2	2
(Spain) L Romero Gormaz	6	2	6
7	(Latvia) D Semeņistaja	2	6	2

Second round
(Japan) M Uchijima	4	7^{7}	5
(Spain) I Burillo	6	6^{2}	7
(Sweden) K Rinaldo Persson	6^{5}	6	3
8	(Spain) K Quevedo	7^{7}	3	6
4	(Switzerland) S Waltert	6	6
(Czech Republic) A Laboutková	2	0
(Romania) M Bulgaru	3	3
(Spain) L Romero Gormaz	6	6

Quarterfinals
(Spain) I Burillo	6	4	4
8	(Spain) K Quevedo	4	6	6
4	(Switzerland) S Waltert	6	6
(Spain) L Romero Gormaz	2	1

Semifinals
8	(Spain) K Quevedo	5	2
4	(Switzerland) S Waltert	7	6

=== Bottom half ===
First round
5	(Austria) S Kraus	7	6
(United States) C Liu	5	0
WC	(Sweden) J Björk	2	3
(Sweden) C Hennemann	6	6
(Germany) M Barthel	4	2
(Serbia) L Radivojević	6	6
(Greece) M Matoula	6^{3}	1
3	(Kazakhstan) Y Putintseva	7^{7}	6
6	(Colombia) E Arango	6	6
(Sweden) L Nilsson	2	2
(Spain) M Bassols Ribera	3	2
(Spain) P Badosa	6	6
(Sweden) L Zaar	4	6	6^{1}
(United States) V Lepchenko	6	4	7^{7}
WC	(Sweden) L Bajraliu	2	3
2	(Germany) T Korpatsch	6	6

Second round
5	(Austria) S Kraus	6	6
(Sweden) C Hennemann	2	4
(Serbia) L Radivojević	4	5
3	(Kazakhstan) Y Putintseva	6	7
6	(Colombia) E Arango	3	2
(Spain) P Badosa	6	6
(United States) V Lepchenko	6	6
2	(Germany) T Korpatsch	1	2

Quarterfinals
5	(Austria) S Kraus	2	3
3	(Kazakhstan) Y Putintseva	6	6
(Spain) P Badosa	7	7^{7}
(United States) V Lepchenko	5	6^{3}

Semifinals
3	(Kazakhstan) Y Putintseva	1	2
(Spain) P Badosa	6	6
