= 2010 Swedish Open – Women's doubles =

Women's doubles
- 2010 Swedish Open

Final
- Champion: (Argentina) Gisela Dulko (Italy) Flavia Pennetta
- Runner-up: (Czech Republic) Renata Voráčová (Czech Republic) Barbora Záhlavová-Strýcová
- Score: 7–6^{(7–0)}, 6–0

Details
- Draw: 16
- Seeds: 4

Events
Singles	men	women
Doubles	men	women
- Swedish Open

Gisela Dulko and Flavia Pennetta were the defending champions.
They won this year's event again after beating Renata Voráčová and Barbora Záhlavová-Strýcová in the final 7–6^{(7–0)}, 6–0.

== Seeds ==
1. (Argentina) Gisela Dulko / (Italy) Flavia Pennetta (champions)
2. (Czech Republic) Renata Voráčová / (Czech Republic) Barbora Záhlavová-Strýcová (final)
3. (Poland) Klaudia Jans / (Poland) Alicja Rosolska (semifinals)
4. (South Africa) Natalie Grandin / (Czech Republic) Vladimíra Uhlířová (semifinals)

== Draw ==
Key

- Q = Qualifier
- WC = Wild card
- LL = Lucky loser
- Alt = Alternate
- ITF = ITF entry
- PR = Protected ranking
- SR = Special ranking
- SE = Special exempt
- JE = Junior exempt
- JR = Junior Accelerator Programme entrant
- CO = College Accelerator Programme entrant
- NG = Next Gen Accelerator Program entrant
- w/o = Walkover
- r = Retired
- d = Defaulted

=== Brackets ===
First round
1	(Argentina) G Dulko (Italy) F Pennetta	6	6
WC	(Sweden) A Brazhnikova (Finland) E Laine	2	4
(Georgia (country)) O Kalashnikova (Slovenia) M Zec Peškirič	2	2
(United States) L Osterloh (Georgia (country)) A Tatishvili	6	6
4	(South Africa) N Grandin (Czech Republic) V Uhlířová	6	6
(Germany) T Malek (Spain) A Parra Santonja	4	0
(Australia) An Rodionova (Russia) Ar Rodionova	2	6^{4}
(Sweden) S Arvidsson (Sweden) J Larsson	6	7
(Russia) M Kondratieva (France) S Lefèvre	0	1
(Italy) ME Camerin (Germany) A-L Grönefeld	6	6
(Uzbekistan) A Amanmuradova (Estonia) K Kanepi	2	2
3	(Poland) K Jans (Poland) A Rosolska	6	6
(Bosnia and Herzegovina) M Jugić-Salkić (Croatia) D Jurak	6	6
(Germany) L Siegemund (Germany) K Wörle	2	2
WC	(France) A Rezaï (Czech Republic) L Šafářová	4	3
2	(Czech Republic) R Voráčová (Czech Republic) B Záhlavová-Strýcová	6	6

Quarterfinals
1	(Argentina) G Dulko (Italy) F Pennetta	4	7	[10]
(United States) L Osterloh (Georgia (country)) A Tatishvili	6	5	[6]
4	(South Africa) N Grandin (Czech Republic) V Uhlířová	6	6
(Sweden) S Arvidsson (Sweden) J Larsson	3	4
(Italy) ME Camerin (Germany) A-L Grönefeld	5	7	[2]
3	(Poland) K Jans (Poland) A Rosolska	7	5	[10]
(Bosnia and Herzegovina) M Jugić-Salkić (Croatia) D Jurak	6^{4}	2
2	(Czech Republic) R Voráčová (Czech Republic) B Záhlavová-Strýcová	7	6

Semifinals
1	(Argentina) G Dulko (Italy) F Pennetta	6	6
4	(South Africa) N Grandin (Czech Republic) V Uhlířová	2	1
3	(Poland) K Jans (Poland) A Rosolska	2	4
2	(Czech Republic) R Voráčová (Czech Republic) B Záhlavová-Strýcová	6	6

Final
1	(Argentina) G Dulko (Italy) F Pennetta	7	6
2	(Czech Republic) R Voráčová (Czech Republic) B Záhlavová-Strýcová	6^{0}	0
