= 2011 Swedish Open – Women's singles =

Women's singles
- 2011 Swedish Open

Final
- Champion: (Slovenia) Polona Hercog
- Runner-up: (Sweden) Johanna Larsson
- Score: 6–4, 7–5

Details
- Draw: 32
- Seeds: 8

Events
Singles	men	women
Doubles	men	women
- Swedish Open

Aravane Rezaï was the defending champion, but lost to Polona Hercog in the second round.

Eighth seed Hercog reached the final, where she defeated home player Johanna Larsson, 6–4, 7–5. It was her first WTA Tour title.

== Seeds ==
1. (Denmark) Caroline Wozniacki (second round, retired due to shoulder injury)
2. (Italy) Flavia Pennetta (quarterfinals)
3. (Czech Republic) Lucie Šafářová (first round)
4. (Spain) Lourdes Domínguez Lino (quarterfinals)
5. (Russia) Vera Dushevina (second round)
6. (Czech Republic) Iveta Benešová (first round)
7. (Czech Republic) Barbora Záhlavová-Strýcová (semifinals)
8. (Slovenia) Polona Hercog (champion)

== Draw ==
Key

- Q = Qualifier
- WC = Wild card
- LL = Lucky loser
- Alt = Alternate
- ITF = ITF entry
- PR = Protected ranking
- SR = Special ranking
- SE = Special exempt
- JE = Junior exempt
- JR = Junior Accelerator Programme entrant
- CO = College Accelerator Programme entrant
- NG = Next Gen Accelerator Program entrant
- w/o = Walkover
- r = Retired
- d = Defaulted

=== Finals ===
Semifinals
(Sweden) Sofia Arvidsson	3	1
(Sweden) Johanna Larsson	6	6
8	(Slovenia) Polona Hercog	6	4	7
7	(Czech Republic) Barbora Záhlavová-Strýcová	2	6	5

Final
(Sweden) Johanna Larsson	4	5
8	(Slovenia) Polona Hercog	6	7

=== Top half ===
First round
1	(Denmark) C Wozniacki	6	6
(France) A Cornet	4	4
(Czech Republic) A Hlaváčková	1	7	4
(Sweden) S Arvidsson	6	5	6
(Spain) N Llagostera Vives	4	6	6
Q	(France) A Lim	6	2	2
(Spain) MJ Martínez Sánchez	6	6
6	(Czech Republic) I Benešová	2	0
4	(Spain) L Domínguez Lino	6	6
WC	(Sweden) E Allgurin	3	4
(Spain) A Parra Santonja	7	6
Q	(Ukraine) T Arefyeva	5	3
(Sweden) J Larsson	6	6
(Russia) A Kudryavtseva	3	1
Q	(Germany) M Barthel	2	6^{2}
5	(Russia) V Dushevina	6	7

Second round
1	(Denmark) C Wozniacki	6	0^{r}
(Sweden) S Arvidsson	2	1
(Spain) N Llagostera Vives	5	1
(Spain) MJ Martínez Sánchez	7	6
4	(Spain) L Domínguez Lino	7	6
(Spain) A Parra Santonja	5	1
(Sweden) J Larsson	6^{4}	6	6
5	(Russia) V Dushevina	7^{7}	2	2

Quarterfinals
(Sweden) S Arvidsson	4	7^{8}	7^{7}
(Spain) MJ Martínez Sánchez	6	6^{6}	6^{3}
4	(Spain) L Domínguez Lino	4	6	5
(Sweden) J Larsson	6	3	7

Semifinals
(Sweden) S Arvidsson	3	1
(Sweden) J Larsson	6	6

=== Bottom half ===
First round
8	(Slovenia) P Hercog	7	6
(Georgia (country)) A Tatishvili	5	3
(France) A Rezaï	6	4	6
(Uzbekistan) A Amanmuradova	2	6	3
(Croatia) M Lučić	5	6	5
(Romania) S Cîrstea	7	2	7
(Russia) V Dolonts	6	6
3	(Czech Republic) L Šafářová	3	4
7	(Czech Republic) B Záhlavová-Strýcová	6	6
WC	(Sweden) H Melander	2	3
(United States) J Craybas	6	6^{5}	1
(Belarus) A Yakimova	2	7^{7}	6
WC	(Sweden) A Brazhnikova	2	2
(Germany) A Kerber	6	6
Q	(Australia) O Rogowska	2	5
2	(Italy) F Pennetta	6	7

Second round
8	(Slovenia) P Hercog	3	6	7^{7}
(France) A Rezaï	6	4	6^{4}
(Romania) S Cîrstea	3	3
(Russia) V Dolonts	6	6
7	(Czech Republic) B Záhlavová-Strýcová	7	4	6
(Belarus) A Yakimova	5	6	3
(Germany) A Kerber	2	3
2	(Italy) F Pennetta	6	6

Quarterfinals
8	(Slovenia) P Hercog	6	6
(Russia) V Dolonts	2	4
7	(Czech Republic) B Záhlavová-Strýcová	6	5	6
2	(Italy) F Pennetta	4	7	3

Semifinals
8	(Slovenia) P Hercog	6	4	7
7	(Czech Republic) B Záhlavová-Strýcová	2	6	5
