= 2013 Swedish Open – Women's doubles =

Women's doubles
- 2013 Swedish Open

Final
- Champions: (Spain) Anabel Medina Garrigues (Czech Republic) Klára Zakopalová
- Runners-up: (Romania) Alexandra Dulgheru (Italy) Flavia Pennetta
- Score: 6–1, 6–4

Details
- Draw: 16
- Seeds: 4

Events
Singles	men	women
Doubles	men	women
- Swedish Open

Catalina Castaño and Mariana Duque Mariño were the defending champions, but Castaño chose not to participate. Duque Mariño played alongside Teliana Pereira, but lost to Anabel Medina Garrigues and Klára Zakopalová in the semifinals.
Medina Garrigues and Zakopalová went on to win the title, defeating Alexandra Dulgheru and Flavia Pennetta in the final, 6–1, 6–4.

== Seeds ==
1. (Spain) Anabel Medina Garrigues / (Czech Republic) Klára Zakopalová (champions)
2. (Spain) Arantxa Parra Santonja / (Spain) Silvia Soler Espinosa (quarterfinals)
3. (Russia) Alla Kudryavtseva / (Ukraine) Olga Savchuk (quarterfinals)
4. (Ukraine) Irina Buryachok / (Georgia (country)) Anna Tatishvili (quarterfinals)

== Draw ==
Key

- Q = Qualifier
- WC = Wild card
- LL = Lucky loser
- Alt = Alternate
- ITF = ITF entry
- PR = Protected ranking
- SR = Special ranking
- SE = Special exempt
- JE = Junior exempt
- JR = Junior Accelerator Programme entrant
- CO = College Accelerator Programme entrant
- NG = Next Gen Accelerator Program entrant
- w/o = Walkover
- r = Retired
- d = Defaulted

=== Draw ===
First round
1	(Spain) A Medina Garrigues (Czech Republic) K Zakopalová	6	6
(Russia) N Bratchikova (France) C Garcia	4	0
(Russia) M Melnikova (Kyrgyzstan) K Palkina	2	6	[10]
WC	(Sweden) J Cabaj Awad (Sweden) C Lister	6	2	[5]
3	(Russia) A Kudryavtseva (Ukraine) O Savchuk	6	7
(Russia) M Kondratieva (France) L Thorpe	3	5
(Sweden) S Arvidsson (Sweden) J Larsson	6	1	[5]
(Colombia) M Duque Mariño (Brazil) T Pereira	1	6	[10]
(Romania) A Dulgheru (Italy) F Pennetta	7^{7}	6
(Netherlands) R Hogenkamp (Netherlands) L Kerkhove	6^{4}	2
(Latvia) D Marcinkēviča (United Kingdom) N Slater	1	3
4	(Ukraine) I Buryachok (Georgia (country)) A Tatishvili	6	6
(United States) J Cohen (Poland) J Jegiołka	3	0
(Spain) L Arruabarrena (Spain) L Domínguez Lino	6	6
WC	(Sweden) E Allgurin (Sweden) R Peterson	4	5
2	(Spain) A Parra Santonja (Spain) S Soler Espinosa	6	7

Quarterfinals
1	(Spain) A Medina Garrigues (Czech Republic) K Zakopalová	6	6
(Russia) M Melnikova (Kyrgyzstan) K Palkina	2	3
3	(Russia) A Kudryavtseva (Ukraine) O Savchuk	1	1
(Colombia) M Duque Mariño (Brazil) T Pereira	6	6
(Romania) A Dulgheru (Italy) F Pennetta	6	6^{8}	[10]
4	(Ukraine) I Buryachok (Georgia (country)) A Tatishvili	4	7^{10}	[6]
(Spain) L Arruabarrena (Spain) L Domínguez Lino	6	6
2	(Spain) A Parra Santonja (Spain) S Soler Espinosa	4	3

Semifinals
1	(Spain) A Medina Garrigues (Czech Republic) K Zakopalová	7^{9}	6
(Colombia) M Duque Mariño (Brazil) T Pereira	6^{7}	1
(Romania) A Dulgheru (Italy) F Pennetta	7^{7}	4	[10]
(Spain) L Arruabarrena (Spain) L Domínguez Lino	6^{3}	6	[6]

Final
1	(Spain) A Medina Garrigues (Czech Republic) K Zakopalová	6	6
(Romania) A Dulgheru (Italy) F Pennetta	1	4
