= 2010 Swedish Open – Men's doubles =

Men's doubles
- 2010 Swedish Open

Final
- Champions: (Sweden) Robert Lindstedt (Romania) Horia Tecău
- Runners-up: (Italy) Andreas Seppi (Italy) Simone Vagnozzi
- Score: 6–4, 7–5

Details
- Draw: 16
- Seeds: 4

Events
Singles	men	women
Doubles	men	women
- Swedish Open

Jaroslav Levinský and Filip Polášek were the defending champions, but Levinský didn't participate this year.
Polášek chose to play with Leoš Friedl. However, they lost to Máximo González and Sebastián Prieto in the first round.
Robert Lindstedt and Horia Tecău won in the final 6–4, 7–5, against Andreas Seppi and Simone Vagnozzi.

== Seeds ==
1. (Spain) Marcel Granollers / (Spain) Tommy Robredo (quarterfinals)
2. (Sweden) Robert Lindstedt / (Romania) Horia Tecău (champions)
3. (Czech Republic) Leoš Friedl / (Czech Republic) Filip Polášek (first round)
4. (Italy) Daniele Bracciali / (Italy) Potito Starace (semifinals, withdrew)

== Draw ==
Key

- Q = Qualifier
- WC = Wild card
- LL = Lucky loser
- Alt = Alternate
- ITF = ITF entry
- PR = Protected ranking
- SR = Special ranking
- SE = Special exempt
- JE = Junior exempt
- JR = Junior Accelerator Programme entrant
- CO = College Accelerator Programme entrant
- NG = Next Gen Accelerator Program entrant
- w/o = Walkover
- r = Retired
- d = Defaulted

=== Draw ===
First round
1	(Spain) M Granollers (Spain) T Robredo	6	6
(India) H Mankad (Poland) M Przysiężny	4	1
WC	(Sweden) C Bergman (Sweden) F Prpic	4	3
(Kazakhstan) A Golubev (Uzbekistan) D Istomin	6	6
3	(Czech Republic) L Friedl (Czech Republic) F Polášek	6^{5}	4
(Argentina) M González (Argentina) S Prieto	7^{7}	6
(Italy) A Seppi (Italy) S Vagnozzi	7	6^{5}	[10]
(United Kingdom) J Marray (United Kingdom) J Murray	5	7^{7}	[3]
(France) S Robert (France) F Serra	3	2
(Italy) F Fognini (Spain) P Riba	6	6
(Spain) R Ramírez Hidalgo (Spain) S Ventura	4	0
4	(Italy) D Bracciali (Italy) P Starace	6	6
(Poland) T Bednarek (Poland) M Kowalczyk	3	6	[10]
WC	(Sweden) T Blomgren (Sweden) C Lindell	6	2	[7]
(Australia) P Luczak (Sweden) A Siljeström	1	3
2	(Sweden) R Lindstedt (Romania) H Tecău	6	6

Quarterfinals
1	(Spain) M Granollers (Spain) T Robredo	6	6^{5}	[6]
(Kazakhstan) A Golubev (Uzbekistan) D Istomin	3	7^{7}	[10]
(Argentina) M González (Argentina) S Prieto	6	4	[12]
(Italy) A Seppi (Italy) S Vagnozzi	3	6	[14]
(Italy) F Fognini (Spain) P Riba	1	3
4	(Italy) D Bracciali (Italy) P Starace	6	6
(Poland) T Bednarek (Poland) M Kowalczyk	4	2
2	(Sweden) R Lindstedt (Romania) H Tecău	6	6

Semifinals
(Kazakhstan) A Golubev (Uzbekistan) D Istomin	6	1	[6]
(Italy) A Seppi (Italy) S Vagnozzi	3	6	[10]
4	(Italy) D Bracciali (Italy) P Starace	w/o
2	(Sweden) R Lindstedt (Romania) H Tecău

Finals
(Italy) A Seppi (Italy) S Vagnozzi	4	5
2	(Sweden) R Lindstedt (Romania) H Tecău	6	7
