= 2010 Swedish Open – Men's singles =

Men's singles
- 2010 Swedish Open

Final
- Champion: (Spain) Nicolás Almagro
- Runner-up: (Sweden) Robin Söderling
- Score: 7–5, 3–6, 6–2

Details
- Draw: 28
- Seeds: 8

Events
| Singles | men | women |
| Doubles | men | women |
- Swedish Open

Robin Söderling was the defending champion, but he lost to Nicolás Almagro in the final 5–7, 6–3, 2–6.

== Seeds ==
The top four seeds receive a bye into the second round.

1. (Sweden) Robin Söderling (final)
2. (Spain) Fernando Verdasco (quarterfinals)
3. (Spain) David Ferrer (semifinals)
4. (Spain) Nicolás Almagro (champion)
5. (Spain) Tommy Robredo (semifinals)
6. (France) Paul-Henri Mathieu (first round)
7. (Uzbekistan) Denis Istomin (first round)
8. (France) Florent Serra (first round)

== Draw ==
Key

- Q = Qualifier
- WC = Wild card
- LL = Lucky loser
- Alt = Alternate
- ITF = ITF entry
- PR = Protected ranking
- SR = Special ranking
- SE = Special exempt
- JE = Junior exempt
- JR = Junior Accelerator Programme entrant
- CO = College Accelerator Programme entrant
- NG = Next Gen Accelerator Program entrant
- w/o = Walkover
- r = Retired
- d = Defaulted

=== Finals ===
Semifinals
1 | (Sweden) Robin Söderling | 4 | 6 | 6
3 | (Spain) David Ferrer | 6 | 3 | 2
4 | (Spain) Nicolás Almagro | 6 | 6
5 | (Spain) Tommy Robredo | 1 | 3

Final
1 | (Sweden) Robin Söderling | 5 | 6 | 2
4 | (Spain) Nicolás Almagro | 7 | 3 | 6

=== Top half ===
First round
(Germany) D Brands | 6^{6} | 7^{7} | 4
WC | (Sweden) A Vinciguerra | 7^{8} | 6^{5} | 6
(Spain) M Granollers | 4 | 2
(Italy) A Seppi | 6 | 6
(Italy) P Starace | 6 | 6
8 | (France) F Serra | 2 | 2
(Italy) F Fognini | 6^{7} | 6 | 6
WC | (Sweden) F Prpic | 7^{9} | 3 | 4
(Spain) P Riba | 4 | 6 | 7^{8}
(Australia) P Luczak | 6 | 2 | 6^{6}
(Uruguay) P Cuevas | 7^{7} | 7^{7}
6 | (France) P-H Mathieu | 6^{2} | 6^{3}

Second round
1 | (Sweden) R Söderling | 6 | 6^{6} | 6
WC | (Sweden) A Vinciguerra | 2 | 7^{8} | 2
(Italy) A Seppi | 6 | 3 | 7^{9}
(Italy) P Starace | 4 | 6 | 6^{7}
3 | (Spain) D Ferrer | 6 | 7
(Italy) F Fognini | 3 | 5
(Spain) P Riba | 4 | 2
(Uruguay) P Cuevas | 6 | 6

Quarterfinals
1 | (Sweden) R Söderling | 4 | 7 | 7^{7}
(Italy) A Seppi | 6 | 5 | 6^{5}
3 | (Spain) D Ferrer | 6 | 6
(Uruguay) P Cuevas | 3 | 3

Semifinals
1 | (Sweden) R Söderling | 4 | 6 | 6
3 | (Spain) D Ferrer | 6 | 3 | 2

=== Bottom half ===
First round
7 | (Uzbekistan) D Istomin | 6^{5} | 6^{7}
Q | (Croatia) F Škugor | 7^{7} | 7^{9}
Q | (Sweden) E Eleskovic | 6 | 6
Q | (Poland) J Janowicz | 3 | 4
(Finland) J Nieminen | 4 | 6 | 6
WC | (Sweden) C Lindell | 6 | 0 | 4
5 | (Spain) T Robredo | 7^{7} | 6
(Poland) M Przysiężny | 6^{3} | 3
(Kazakhstan) A Golubev | 6 | 6
(Argentina) M González | 3 | 2
(France) S Robert | 6 | 6
Q | (France) J Dasnières de Veigy | 4 | 1

Second round
Q | (Croatia) F Škugor | 6 | 6
Q | (Sweden) E Eleskovic | 2 | 3
(Finland) J Nieminen | 4 | 4
4 | (Spain) N Almagro | 6 | 6
5 | (Spain) T Robredo | 3 | 6 | 6
(Kazakhstan) A Golubev | 6 | 3 | 2
(France) S Robert | 1 | 1
2 | (Spain) F Verdasco | 6 | 6

Quarterfinals
Q | (Croatia) F Škugor | 6 | 4 | 0
4 | (Spain) N Almagro | 4 | 6 | 6
5 | (Spain) T Robredo | 6 | 6
2 | (Spain) F Verdasco | 4 | 3

Semifinals
4 | (Spain) N Almagro | 6 | 6
5 | (Spain) T Robredo | 1 | 3
