= 2011 Swedish Open =

- Date: 4–10 July (women); 11–17 July (men)
- Edition: 3rd (women); 64th (men)
- Surface: Clay / outdoors
- Location: Båstad, Sweden

Champions

Men's singles
- (Sweden) Robin Söderling

Women's singles
- (Slovenia) Polona Hercog

Men's doubles
- (Sweden) Robert Lindstedt / (Romania) Horia Tecău

Women's doubles
- (Spain) Lourdes Domínguez Lino / (Spain) María José Martínez Sánchez
- Swedish Open

The 2011 Swedish Open was a tennis tournament played on outdoor clay courts part of the ATP World Tour 250 Series of the 2011 ATP World Tour and 2011 WTA Tour. It took place in Båstad, Sweden, from 4 July through 10 July 2011 for women's and from 11 July through 17 July 2011 for men's. It was also known as 2011 Collector Swedish Open for the Women's and 2011 SkiStar Swedish Open for the Men's for sponsorship reasons. It was the 3rd edition for the Women's, while the 64th for the Men's.

== Finals ==
=== Men's singles ===
(Sweden) Robin Söderling defeated (Spain) David Ferrer, 6–2, 6–2

- It was Söderling's fourth title of the year and tenth of his career. It was his second win at Båstad, having also won in 2009. It was also his last match of his career as he was plagued by injuries for the next 4 years and retired in December 2015.

=== Women's singles ===
(Slovenia) Polona Hercog defeated (Sweden) Johanna Larsson, 6–4, 7–5

- It was Hercog's first career title.

=== Men's doubles ===
(Sweden) Robert Lindstedt / (Romania) Horia Tecău defeated (Sweden) Simon Aspelin / (Sweden) Andreas Siljeström, 6–3, 6–3

=== Women's doubles ===
(Spain) Lourdes Domínguez Lino / (Spain) María José Martínez Sánchez defeated (Spain) Nuria Llagostera Vives / (Spain) Arantxa Parra Santonja, 6–3, 6–3

== WTA entrants ==
=== Players ===
Country	Player	Ranking*	Seeding
DEN	Caroline Wozniacki	1	1
ITA	Flavia Pennetta	21	2
CZE	Lucie Šafářová	32	3
ESP	Lourdes Domínguez Lino	48	4
RUS	Vera Dushevina	51	5
CZE	Iveta Benešová	53	6
CZE	Barbora Záhlavová-Strýcová	55	7
SLO	Polona Hercog	59	8

- Seedings are based on the rankings of June 21, 2011.

=== Other entrants ===
The following players received wildcards into the singles main draw:

- (Sweden) Ellen Allgurin
- (Sweden) Anna Brazhnikova
- (Sweden) Hilda Melander

The following players received entry from the qualifying draw:

- (Ukraine) Tetyana Arefyeva
- (Germany) Mona Barthel
- (France) Alizé Lim
- (Australia) Olivia Rogowska

== ATP entrants ==
=== Seeds ===
Country	Player	Rank^{*}	Seed
SWE	Robin Söderling	5	1
ESP	David Ferrer	6	2
CZE	Tomáš Berdych	9	3
ESP	Nicolás Almagro	13	4
ESP	Tommy Robredo	33	5
ARG	Juan Mónaco	43	6
KAZ	Andrey Golubev	45	7
ITA	Potito Starace	52	8

- Seedings are based on the rankings of July 4, 2011.

=== Other entrants ===
The following players received wildcards into the singles main draw:

- (Sweden) Christian Lindell
- (Sweden) Michael Ryderstedt
- (Sweden) Andreas Vinciguerra

The following players received entry as a special exempt into the singles main draw:

- (United States) Michael Yani

The following players received entry from the qualifying draw:

- (France) Jonathan Dasnières de Veigy
- (Argentina) Diego Junqueira
- (Spain) Guillermo Olaso
- (Croatia) Antonio Veić
