= Telenordia =

Swedish telecommunications company

Telenordia was a Swedish telephone company and Internet service provider. It was founded in 1995 as a joint venture between BT Group, TeleDanmark and Telenor. TeleDanmark sold its part in 2000. In 2001 the company was split up between BT and Telenor. The private customers were bought by Glocalnet.
