= Swedish Open =

Coordinates: 56.435°N 12.838°E

Nordea Open

Tournament information
- Event name: Nordea Open (2021-)
- Founded: 1948; 78 years ago
- Location: Båstad; Sweden
- Venue: Båstad Tennis Stadium
- Surface: Clay / outdoor
- Website: nordeaopen.se

Current champions (2026)
- Men's singles: Andrey Rublev
- Women's singles: (Spain) Paula Badosa
- Men's doubles: (France) Sadio Doumbia (France) Fabien Reboul
- Women's doubles: (Colombia) Emiliana Arango (Switzerland) Simona Waltert
ATP Tour
- Category: ATP Tour 250
- Draw: 32S / 16Q / 16D
- Prize money: €596,035 (2025)
WTA Tour
- Category: WTA 125
- Draw: 32S / 16D
- Prize money: $115,000

The Swedish Open, called Nordea Open (sponsored by Nordea), is a professional tennis tournament held in Båstad, Sweden. It is played on outdoor clay courts in July. The men's event is an ATP Tour 250 tournament. The women's event was an International tournament and successor to the Nordic Light Open in Stockholm, and from 2019 onwards is a WTA 125 series-level tournament.

== History ==
The Swedish Open was first held in 1948 when it was called the International Swedish Hard Court Championships. Between 1970 and 1989 the men's event was part of the Grand Prix tennis circuit.

The first three tournaments were won by Eric Sturgess from South Africa. Other famous champions include Ilie Năstase (1971), Björn Borg (1974, 1978–1979), Mats Wilander (1982–1983, 1985), and Rafael Nadal (2005). The stadium in which the tournament is held underwent reconstruction in 2002 to accommodate the new hotel underneath the seaside bleachers.

From 1948 to 1990, there was also a women's singles tournament. After the Nordic Light Open in Stockholm was sold, it was announced that the women's event would return to Båstad in 2009. From 2009 to 2017, the Collector Swedish Open Women in Båstad has been an International-level tournament. In 2018, the women's tournament license was sold and it was held in Moscow (Russia) as Moscow River Cup from 22 to 27 July 2018. However, in 2019, the tournaments was reinstated as a WTA 125 tournament called the Nordea Open.

=== Title sponsors ===
==== ATP ====
The tournament has in the latter years been named after its principal sponsor. These sponsors have changed, thus changing the name of the tournament. Title sponsors include:

- Investor Swedish Open (19??–1999), sponsored by Investor AB
- Wideyes Swedish Open (2000), sponsored by Wideyes
- Telenordia Swedish Open (2001–2002), sponsored by Telenordia
- Synsam Swedish Open (2003–2006), sponsored by Synsam
- Catella Swedish Open (2007–2009), sponsored by Catella
- SkiStar Swedish Open (2010–2019), sponsored by Skistar
- Nordea Open (2020 (cancelled) – present) sponsored by Nordea

==== WTA ====
The tournament was sponsored by Ericsson until the Women's and Men tournament shared title sponsor first with Skistar and then currently Nordea.

=== International Series Tournament of the Year ===
Each year, the players on the ATP Tour vote for the ATP Tournament of the Year. Swedish Open has received this honor eleven consecutive years, winning the International Series Tournament of the Year in the ATP 250 category from 2002 to 2012. The Swedish Open is the only tournament to have won this award eleven times.

== Past finals ==
=== Men's singles ===
Year	Champion	Runner-up	Score
1948	(South Africa) Eric Sturgess	(Argentina) Enrique Morea	6–2, 7–5, 6–4
1949	(South Africa) Eric Sturgess	(Sweden) Torsten Johansson	6–1, 6–0, 6–4
1950	(South Africa) Eric Sturgess	(Sweden) Torsten Johansson	5–7, 7–5, 6–3, 6–4
1951	(Philippines) Felicisimo Ampon	(Philippines) Raymundo Deyro	9–7, 6–0, 6–1
1952	(United States) Budge Patty	(Australia) Mervyn Rose	6–4, 6–3, 4–6, 6–3
1953	(United States) Budge Patty	(Sweden) Sven Davidson	6–4, 7–5, 6–8, 6–4
1954	(United States) Budge Patty	(United States) Rex Hartwig	7–5, 2–6, 3–6, 8–6, 6–4
1955	(United States) Ham Richardson	(Australia) Mervyn Rose	4–6, 6–2, 6–4, 6–2
1956	(Australia) Ken Rosewall	(Denmark) Kurt Nielsen	7–5, 6–3, 6–1
1957	(Sweden) Ulf Schmidt	(Sweden) Sven Davidson	4–6, 6–4, 6–3, 6–3
1958	(Australia) Ashley Cooper	(Australia) Mervyn Rose	2–6, 2–6, 6–3, 6–4, 6–3
1959	(Chile) Luis Ayala	(India) Ramanathan Krishnan	6–1, 6–1, 5–7, 6–1
1960	(Chile) Luis Ayala	(India) Ramanathan Krishnan	6–1, 6–0, 6–4
1961	(Sweden) Ulf Schmidt	(Australia) Neale Fraser	6–3, 6–4, 7–5
1962	(Spain) Manuel Santana	(Sweden) Jan-Erik Lundqvist	4–6, 5–7, 6–4, 7–5, 6–3
1963	(Sweden) Jan-Erik Lundqvist	(Socialist Federal Republic of Yugoslavia) Boro Jovanović	6–4, 7–5, 6–4
1964	(Australia) Roy Emerson	(Socialist Federal Republic of Yugoslavia) Nikola Pilić	1–6, 7–5, 6–1, 6–2
1965	(Spain) Manuel Santana	(Australia) Roy Emerson	6–1, 6–1, 6–4
1966	(Soviet Union) Alexander Metreveli	(Spain) Manuel Santana	3–6, 2–6, 6–1, 7–5, 6–4
1967	(Australia) Martin Mulligan	Emerson, Lundqvist, Okker	Round robin
↓ Open era ↓
1968	(Italy) Martin Mulligan	(Romania) Ion Țiriac	8–6, 6–4, 6–4
1969	(Spain) Manuel Santana	(Romania) Ion Țiriac	8–6, 6–4, 6–1
↓ Grand Prix circuit ↓
1970	(Australia) Dick Crealy	(France) Georges Goven	6–3, 6–1, 6–1
1971	(Romania) Ilie Năstase	(Denmark) Jan Leschly	6–7, 6–2, 6–1, 6–4
1972	(Spain) Manuel Orantes	(Romania) Ilie Năstase	6–4, 6–3, 6–1
1973	(United States) Stan Smith	(Spain) Manuel Orantes	6–4, 6–2, 7–6
1974	(Sweden) Björn Borg	(Italy) Adriano Panatta	6–3, 6–0, 6–7, 6–3
1975	(Spain) Manuel Orantes	(Spain) José Higueras	6–0, 6–3
1976	(Italy) Tonino Zugarelli	(Italy) Corrado Barazzutti	4–6, 7–5, 6–2
1977	(Italy) Corrado Barazzutti	(Hungary) Balázs Taróczy	7–6, 6–7, 6–2
1978	(Sweden) Björn Borg	(Italy) Corrado Barazzutti	6–1, 6–2
1979	(Sweden) Björn Borg	(Hungary) Balázs Taróczy	6–1, 7–5
1980	(Hungary) Balázs Taróczy	(United States) Tony Giammalva	6–3, 3–6, 7–6
1981	(France) Thierry Tulasne	(Sweden) Anders Järryd	6–2, 6–3
1982	(Sweden) Mats Wilander	(Sweden) Henrik Sundström	6–4, 6–4
1983	(Sweden) Mats Wilander	(Sweden) Anders Järryd	6–1, 6–2
1984	(Sweden) Henrik Sundström	(Sweden) Anders Järryd	3–6, 7–5, 6–3
1985	(Sweden) Mats Wilander	(Sweden) Stefan Edberg	6–1, 6–0
1986	(Spain) Emilio Sánchez	(Sweden) Mats Wilander	7–6, 4–6, 6–4
1987	(Sweden) Joakim Nyström	(Sweden) Stefan Edberg	4–6, 6–0, 6–3
1988	(Uruguay) Marcelo Filippini	(Italy) Francesco Cancellotti	2–6, 6–4, 6–4
1989	(Italy) Paolo Canè	(Socialist Federal Republic of Yugoslavia) Bruno Orešar	7–6, 7–6
↓ ATP Tour 250 (Note: Known as World Series from 1990 till 1999 and International Series from 2000 till 2008.) ↓
1990	(Australia) Richard Fromberg	(Sweden) Magnus Larsson	6–2, 7–6
1991	(Sweden) Magnus Gustafsson	(Argentina) Alberto Mancini	6–1, 6–2
1992	(Sweden) Magnus Gustafsson	(Spain) Tomás Carbonell	5–7, 7–5, 6–4
1993	(Austria) Horst Skoff	(Haiti) Ronald Agénor	7–5, 1–6, 6–0
1994	(Germany) Bernd Karbacher	(Austria) Horst Skoff	6–4, 6–3
1995	(Brazil) Fernando Meligeni	(Norway) Christian Ruud	6–4, 6–4
1996	(Sweden) Magnus Gustafsson	(Ukraine) Andriy Medvedev	6–1, 6–3
1997	(Sweden) Magnus Norman	(Costa Rica) Juan Antonio Marín	7–5, 6–2
1998	(Sweden) Magnus Gustafsson	(Ukraine) Andriy Medvedev	6–2, 6–3
1999	(Costa Rica) Juan Antonio Marín	(Sweden) Andreas Vinciguerra	6–4, 7–6^{(7–4)}
2000	(Sweden) Magnus Norman	(Sweden) Andreas Vinciguerra	6–1, 7–6^{(8–6)}
2001	(Italy) Andrea Gaudenzi	(Czech Republic) Bohdan Ulihrach	7–5, 6–3
2002	(Spain) Carlos Moyá	(Morocco) Younes El Aynaoui	6–3, 2–6, 7–5
2003	(Argentina) Mariano Zabaleta	(Ecuador) Nicolás Lapentti	6–3, 6–4
2004	(Argentina) Mariano Zabaleta	(Argentina) Gastón Gaudio	6–1, 4–6, 7–6^{(7–4)}
2005	(Spain) Rafael Nadal	(Czech Republic) Tomáš Berdych	2–6, 6–2, 6–4
2006	(Spain) Tommy Robredo	(Russia) Nikolay Davydenko	6–2, 6–1
2007	(Spain) David Ferrer	(Spain) Nicolás Almagro	6–1, 6–2
2008	(Spain) Tommy Robredo	(Czech Republic) Tomáš Berdych	6–4, 6–1
2009	(Sweden) Robin Söderling	(Argentina) Juan Mónaco	6–3, 7–6^{(7–4)}
2010	(Spain) Nicolás Almagro	(Sweden) Robin Söderling	7–5, 3–6, 6–2
2011	(Sweden) Robin Söderling	(Spain) David Ferrer	6–2, 6–2
2012	(Spain) David Ferrer	(Spain) Nicolás Almagro	6–2, 6–2
2013	(Argentina) Carlos Berlocq	(Spain) Fernando Verdasco	7–5, 6–1
2014	(Uruguay) Pablo Cuevas	(Portugal) João Sousa	6–2, 6–1
2015	(France) Benoît Paire	(Spain) Tommy Robredo	7–6^{(9–7)}, 6–3
2016	(Spain) Albert Ramos Viñolas	(Spain) Fernando Verdasco	6–3, 6–4
2017	(Spain) David Ferrer	(Ukraine) Alexandr Dolgopolov	6–4, 6–4
2018	(Italy) Fabio Fognini	(France) Richard Gasquet	6–3, 3–6, 6–1
2019	(Chile) Nicolás Jarry	(Argentina) Juan Ignacio Londero	7–6^{(9–7)}, 6–4
2020	Cancelled due to the COVID-19 pandemic		
2021	(Norway) Casper Ruud	(Argentina) Federico Coria	6–3, 6–3
2022	(Argentina) Francisco Cerúndolo	(Argentina) Sebastián Báez	7–6^{(7–4)}, 6–2
2023	(Note: Competed under no nationality due to the Russian invasion of Ukraine.) Andrey Rublev	(Norway) Casper Ruud	7–6^{(7–3)}, 6–0
2024	(Portugal) Nuno Borges	(Spain) Rafael Nadal	6–3, 6–2
2025	(Italy) Luciano Darderi	(Netherlands) Jesper de Jong	6–4, 3–6, 6–3
2026	Andrey Rublev	(Italy) Luciano Darderi	6–4, 6–3

Champion	Times champion	Year
(Sweden) Magnus Gustafsson	4	1991, 1992, 1996, 1998
(Sweden) Mats Wilander	3	1982, 1983, 1985
(Sweden) Björn Borg	3	1974, 1978, 1979
(Spain) David Ferrer	3	2007, 2012, 2017
(Spain) Manuel Santana	3	1962, 1965, 1969
(United States) Budge Patty	3	1952, 1953, 1954
(South Africa) Eric Sturgess	3	1948, 1949, 1950
Andrey Rublev	2	2023, 2026
(Sweden) Robin Söderling	2	2009, 2011
(Spain) Tommy Robredo	2	2006, 2008
(Argentina) Mariano Zabaleta	2	2003, 2004
(Sweden) Magnus Norman	2	1997, 2000
(Australia) Martin Mulligan	2	1967, 1968
(Sweden) Ulf Schmidt	2	1957, 1961
(Chile) Luis Ayala	2	1959, 1960

=== Men's doubles ===
Year	Champions	Runners-up	Score
1948	(Sweden) Lennart Bergelin (Sweden) Torsten Johansson	(Australia) Jack Harper (South Africa) Eric Sturgess	7–5, 3–6, 6–4, 6–3
1949	(South Africa) Eustace Fannin (South Africa) Eric Sturgess	(Sweden) Torsten Johansson (Australia) George Worthington	2–6, 6–4, 3–6, 6–1, 6–4
1950	(Egypt) Jaroslav Drobný (South Africa) Eric Sturgess	(Sweden) Lennart Bergelin (Sweden) Sven Davidson	6–2, 6–2, 6–2
1951	(Sweden) Lennart Bergelin (Sweden) Sven Davidson	(Philippines) Felicisimo Ampon (Philippines) Cesar Carmona	6–4, 0–6, 6–4, 7–9, 6–4
1952	(United States) Budge Patty (Australia) Mervyn Rose	(Sweden) Sven Davidson (Sweden) Torsten Johansson	7–5, 6–2, 9–7
1953	(United States) Budge Patty (Australia) Mervyn Rose		
1954	(Australia) Rex Hartwig (Australia) Ken Rosewall	(United States) Budge Patty (United States) Tony Trabert	12–14, 8–6, 6–1, 6–3
1955	(United States) Ham Richardson (United States) Vic Seixas		
1956	(Australia) Neale Fraser (Australia) Ken Rosewall		
1957	(United States) Ham Richardson (United States) Hugh Stewart		
1958	(Australia) Ashley Cooper (Australia) Mervyn Rose	(Mexico) Francisco Contreras (Mexico) Mario Llamas	6–2, 6–1, 6–2
1959	(Chile) Luis Ayala (India) Ramanathan Krishnan	(Sweden) Sven Davidson (Sweden) Torsten Johansson	7–5, 6–3, 3–6, 6–1
1960	(Sweden) Jan-Erik Lundqvist (Sweden) Ulf Schmidt	(United States) Chuck McKinley (United States) Hugh Stewart	7–5, 9–7, 2–6, 6–1
1961	(Chile) Luis Ayala (Australia) Neale Fraser	(Sweden) Torsten Johansson (Germany) Christian Kuhnke	6–4, 6–2, 10–8
1962	(Australia) Roy Emerson (India) Ramanathan Krishnan	(Mexico) Rafael Osuna (Spain) Manuel Santana	6–3, 3–6, 6–2, 9–7
1963	(United States) Chuck McKinley (United States) Dennis Ralston	(Sweden) Jan-Erik Lundqvist (Sweden) Ulf Schmidt	6–4, 6–3, 6–0
1964	(Socialist Federal Republic of Yugoslavia) Boro Jovanović (Socialist Federal Republic of Yugoslavia) Niki Pilić	(Denmark) Jan Leschly (Denmark) Jørgen Ulrich	Coin toss
1965	(Australia) Roy Emerson (Australia) Fred Stolle	(Spain) José Luis Arilla (Spain) Manuel Santana	6–3, 6–8, 6–4, 6–2
1966	(Spain) José Luis Arilla (Spain) Manuel Santana		
1967	(Denmark) Jan Leschly (Denmark) Torben Ulrich		
1968	(United States) Arthur Ashe (United States) Clark Graebner	(Spain) Manuel Orantes (Spain) Manuel Santana	7–5, 6–1
1969	(Romania) Ilie Năstase (Romania) Ion Țiriac	(Spain) Manuel Orantes (Spain) Manuel Santana	6–3, 6–4
↓ Grand Prix circuit ↓
1970	(Australia) Dick Crealy (Australia) Allan Stone	(Socialist Federal Republic of Yugoslavia) Željko Franulović (Czechoslovakia) Jan Kodeš	6–2, 2–6, 12–10
1971	(Romania) Ilie Năstase (Romania) Ion Țiriac	(Chile) Jaime Pinto Bravo (United States) Butch Seewagen	7–6, 6–1
1972	(Spain) Juan Gisbert (Spain) Manuel Orantes	(Australia) Neale Fraser (Romania) Ilie Năstase	6–3, 7–6
1973	(Socialist Federal Republic of Yugoslavia) Nikola Pilić (United States) Stan Smith	(Australia) Bob Carmichael (South Africa) Frew McMillan	2–6, 6–4, 6–4
1974	(Italy) Paolo Bertolucci (Italy) Adriano Panatta	(Sweden) Ove Nils Bengtson (Sweden) Björn Borg	3–6, 6–2, 6–4
1975	(Sweden) Ove Nils Bengtson (Sweden) Björn Borg	(Spain) Juan Gisbert (Spain) Manuel Orantes	7–6, 7–5
1976	(United States) Fred McNair (United States) Sherwood Stewart	(Poland) Wojtek Fibak (Spain) Juan Gisbert	6–3, 6–4
1977	(Australia) Mark Edmondson (Australia) John Marks	(France) Jean-Louis Haillet (France) François Jauffret	6–4, 6–0
1978	(Australia) Bob Carmichael (Australia) Mark Edmondson	(Hungary) Péter Szőke (Hungary) Balázs Taróczy	7–5, 6–4
1979	(Switzerland) Heinz Günthardt (South Africa) Bob Hewitt	(Australia) Mark Edmondson (Australia) John Marks	6–2, 6–2
1980	(Switzerland) Heinz Günthardt (Switzerland) Markus Günthardt	(United Kingdom) John Feaver (Australia) Peter McNamara	6–4, 6–4
1981	(Australia) Mark Edmondson (Australia) John Fitzgerald	(Sweden) Anders Järryd (Sweden) Hans Simonsson	2–6, 7–5, 6–0
1982	(Sweden) Anders Järryd (Sweden) Hans Simonsson	(Sweden) Joakim Nyström (Sweden) Mats Wilander	0–6, 6–3, 7–6
1983	(Sweden) Joakim Nyström (Sweden) Mats Wilander	(Sweden) Anders Järryd (Sweden) Hans Simonsson	1–6, 7–6, 7–6
1984	(Sweden) Jan Gunnarsson (Denmark) Michael Mortensen	(Spain) Juan Avendaño (Brazil) Fernando Roese	6–0, 6–0
1985	(Sweden) Stefan Edberg (Sweden) Anders Järryd	(Spain) Sergio Casal (Spain) Emilio Sánchez	6–0, 7–6
1986	(Spain) Sergio Casal (Spain) Emilio Sánchez	(South Africa) Craig Campbell (United States) Joey Rive	6–4, 6–2
1987	(Sweden) Stefan Edberg (Sweden) Anders Järryd	(Spain) Emilio Sánchez (Spain) Javier Sánchez	7–6, 6–3
1988	(West Germany) Patrick Baur (West Germany) Udo Riglewski	(Sweden) Stefan Edberg (Sweden) Niclas Kroon	6–7, 6–3, 7–6
1989	(Sweden) Per Henricsson (Sweden) Nicklas Utgren	(Czechoslovakia) Josef Čihák (Czechoslovakia) Karel Nováček	7–5, 6–2
↓ ATP Tour 250 ↓
1990	(Sweden) Ronnie Båthman (Sweden) Rikard Bergh	(Sweden) Jan Gunnarsson (Germany) Udo Riglewski	6–1, 6–4
1991	(Sweden) Ronnie Båthman (Sweden) Rikard Bergh	(Sweden) Magnus Gustafsson (Sweden) Anders Järryd	6–4, 6–4
1992	(Spain) Tomás Carbonell (Argentina) Christian Miniussi	(Sweden) Christian Bergström (Sweden) Magnus Gustafsson	6–4, 7–5
1993	(Sweden) Henrik Holm (Sweden) Anders Järryd	(United States) Brian Devening (Sweden) Tomas Nydahl	6–1, 3–6, 6–3
1994	(Sweden) Jan Apell (Sweden) Jonas Björkman	(Sweden) Nicklas Kulti (Sweden) Mikael Tillström	6–2, 6–3
1995	(Sweden) Jan Apell (Sweden) Jonas Björkman	(Australia) Jon Ireland (Australia) Andrew Kratzmann	6–3, 6–0
1996	(Sweden) David Ekerot (United States) Jeff Tarango	(Australia) Joshua Eagle (Sweden) Peter Nyborg	6–4, 3–6, 6–4
1997	(Sweden) Nicklas Kulti (Sweden) Mikael Tillström	(Sweden) Magnus Gustafsson (Sweden) Magnus Larsson	6–0, 6–3
1998	(Sweden) Magnus Gustafsson (Sweden) Magnus Larsson	(South Africa) Lan Bale (South Africa) Piet Norval	6–4, 6–2
1999	(South Africa) David Adams (United States) Jeff Tarango	(Sweden) Nicklas Kulti (Sweden) Mikael Tillström	7–6^{(8–6)}, 6–4
2000	(Sweden) Nicklas Kulti (Sweden) Mikael Tillström	(Italy) Andrea Gaudenzi (Italy) Diego Nargiso	4–6, 6–2, 6–3
2001	(Germany) Karsten Braasch (Germany) Jens Knippschild	(Sweden) Simon Aspelin (Australia) Andrew Kratzmann	7–6(3), 4–6, 7–6^{(7–5)}
2002	(Sweden) Jonas Björkman (Australia) Todd Woodbridge	(Australia) Paul Hanley (Australia) Michael Hill	7–6^{(8–6)}, 6–4
2003	(Sweden) Simon Aspelin (Italy) Massimo Bertolini	(Argentina) Lucas Arnold (Argentina) Mariano Hood	6–7^{(3–7)}, 6–0, 6–4
2004	(India) Mahesh Bhupathi (Sweden) Jonas Björkman	(Sweden) Simon Aspelin (Australia) Todd Perry	4–6, 7–6^{(7–2)}, 7–6^{(8–6)}
2005	(Sweden) Jonas Björkman (Sweden) Joachim Johansson	(Argentina) José Acasuso (Argentina) Sebastián Prieto	6–2 6–3
2006	(Sweden) Jonas Björkman (Sweden) Thomas Johansson	(Germany) Christopher Kas (Austria) Oliver Marach	6–3, 4–6, [10–4]
2007	(Sweden) Simon Aspelin (Austria) Julian Knowle	(Argentina) Martín García (Argentina) Sebastián Prieto	6–2, 6–4
2008	(Sweden) Jonas Björkman (Sweden) Robin Söderling	(Sweden) Johan Brunström (Netherlands Antilles) Jean-Julien Rojer	6–2, 6–2
2009	(Czech Republic) Jaroslav Levinský (Slovakia) Filip Polášek	(Sweden) Robert Lindstedt (Sweden) Robin Söderling	1–6, 6–3, [10–7]
2010	(Sweden) Robert Lindstedt (Romania) Horia Tecău	(Italy) Andreas Seppi (Italy) Simone Vagnozzi	6–4, 7–5
2011	(Sweden) Robert Lindstedt (Romania) Horia Tecău	(Sweden) Simon Aspelin (Sweden) Andreas Siljeström	6–3, 6–3
2012	(Sweden) Robert Lindstedt (Romania) Horia Tecău	(Austria) Alexander Peya (Brazil) Bruno Soares	6–3, 7–6^{(7–5)}
2013	(United States) Nicholas Monroe (Germany) Simon Stadler	(Argentina) Carlos Berlocq (Spain) Albert Ramos	6–2, 3–6, [10–3]
2014	(Sweden) Johan Brunström (United States) Nicholas Monroe	(France) Jérémy Chardy (Austria) Oliver Marach	4–6, 7–6^{(7–5)}, [10–7]
2015	(France) Jérémy Chardy (Poland) Łukasz Kubot	(Colombia) Juan Sebastián Cabal (Colombia) Robert Farah	6–7^{(6–8)}, 6–3, [10–8]
2016	(Spain) Marcel Granollers (Spain) David Marrero	(New Zealand) Marcus Daniell (Brazil) Marcelo Demoliner	6–2, 6–3
2017	(Austria) Julian Knowle (Germany) Philipp Petzschner	(Netherlands) Sander Arends (Netherlands) Matwé Middelkoop	6–2, 3–6, [10–7]
2018	(Chile) Julio Peralta (Argentina) Horacio Zeballos	(Italy) Simone Bolelli (Italy) Fabio Fognini	6–3, 6–4
2019	(Belgium) Sander Gillé (Belgium) Joran Vliegen	(Argentina) Federico Delbonis (Argentina) Horacio Zeballos	6–7^{(5–7)}, 7–5, [10–5]
2020	Cancelled due to the COVID-19 pandemic		
2021	(Netherlands) Sander Arends (Netherlands) David Pel	(Germany) Andre Begemann (France) Albano Olivetti	6–4, 6–2
2022	(Spain) David Vega Hernández (Brazil) Rafael Matos	(Italy) Simone Bolelli (Italy) Fabio Fognini	6–4, 3–6, [13–11]
2023	(Ecuador) Gonzalo Escobar (Kazakhstan) Aleksandr Nedovyesov	(Portugal) Francisco Cabral (Brazil) Rafael Matos	6–2, 6–2
2024	(Brazil) Orlando Luz (Brazil) Rafael Matos	(France) Gregoire Jacq (France) Manuel Guinard	7–5, 6–4
2025	(Argentina) Guido Andreozzi (Netherlands) Sander Arends	(Czech Republic) Adam Pavlásek (Poland) Jan Zieliński	6–7^{(4–7)}, 7–5, [10–6]
2026	(France) Sadio Doumbia (France) Fabien Reboul	(France) Théo Arribagé (Portugal) Francisco Cabral	6–3, 6–4

=== Women's singles ===
==== 1948–present ====
Year	Champion	Runner-up	Score
1948	(Denmark) Hilde Sperling	(Poland) Jadwiga Jędrzejowska	8–6, 0–6, 6–1
1949	(Australia) Thelma Long	(Denmark) Hilde Sperling	6–2, 6–3
1950	(Australia) Thelma Long (2)	(Denmark) Hilde Sperling	3–6, 6–2, 6–4
1951	(Australia) Nancye Wynne Bolton	(Sweden) Solveig Gustafsson	6–3, 6–1
1952	(South Africa) Hazel Redick-Smith	(South Africa) Julia Wipplinger	6–2, 8–6
1953	(United States) Maureen Connolly	(United States) Julia Sampson	6–1, 6–3
1954	(Sweden) Birgit Sandén	(Denmark) Milly Vagn-Nielsen	6–2, 6–2
1955	(United States) Doris Hart	(Switzerland) Ruth Kaufman	6–3, 9–7
1956	(United Kingdom) Angela Buxton	(Sweden) Birgit Sandén	3–6, 6–3, 6–4
1957	(United Kingdom) Shirley Bloomer	(Mexico) Yola Ramírez	7–5, 6–4
1958	(South Africa) Heather Segal	(United States) Karol Fageros	2–6, 6–0, 6–0
1959	(United States) Beverly Baker Fleitz	(United States) Joan Johnson	6–4, 6–1
1960	(Italy) Lea Pericoli	(Italy) Silvana Lazzarino	3–6, 7–5, 6–2
1961	(United States) Belmar Gunderson	(Sweden) Ulla Löthberg	6–1, 6–2
1962	(Brazil) Maria Bueno	(Sweden) Ulla Sandulf	6–2, 6–0
1963	(West Germany) Edda Buding	(Italy) Maria Teresa Riedl	6–1, 7–5
1964	(United States) Donna Fales	(Sweden) Ulla Sandulf	6–3, 5–7, 6–3
1965	(Sweden) Christina Sandberg	(Finland) Leena Ahonen	6–8, 6–4, 6–4
1966	(Sweden) Christina Sandberg (2)	(Sweden) Katarina Bartholdson	6–4, 6–1
1967	(France) Françoise Dürr	(United States) Rosie Casals	7–5, 2–6, 6–2
1968	(United States) Julie Heldman	(United States) Kathleen Harter	default
1969	(United States) Peaches Bartkowicz	(Sweden) Christina Sandberg	5–7, 6–4, 6–2
1970	(United States) Peaches Bartkowicz (2)	(Sweden) Ingrid Bentzer	6–1, 6–1
1971	(West Germany) Helga Masthoff	(Sweden) Ingrid Bentzer	4–6, 6–1, 6–3
1972	(Sweden) Ingrid Bentzer	(Sweden) Christina Sandberg	2–6, 6–3, 8–6
1973	(United Kingdom) Glynis Coles	(Sweden) Christina Sandberg	4–6, 6–4, 6–3
1974	(United Kingdom) Sue Barker	(Netherlands) Marijke Schaar	6–1, 7–5
1975	(United Kingdom) Sue Barker (2)	(West Germany) Helga Niessen Masthoff	6–4, 6–0
1976	(Czechoslovakia) Renáta Tomanová	(Sweden) Helena Anliot	6–3, 6–2
1977	(Romania) Florența Mihai	(United States) Mary Struthers	6–4, 6–4
1978	(Netherlands) Elly Appel-Vessies	(West Germany) Sylvia Hanika	6–2, 6–4
1979	(Sweden) Elisabeth Ekblom	(Sweden) Lena Sandin	7–6, 6–3
1980	(Romania) Virginia Ruzici	(Sweden) Nina Bohm	6–2, 7–5
1981	(Sweden) Lena Sandin	(Sweden) Catrin Jexell	6–2, 7–6
1982	(Sweden) Lena Sandin (2)	(Bulgaria) Manuela Maleeva	6–7, 7–5, 6–3
1983	(Romania) Virginia Ruzici (2)	(Sweden) Carin Anderholm	6–2, 6–3
1984	(Australia) Anette Gulley	(Sweden) Carin Anderholm	4–6, 6–4, 6–4
1985	(Sweden) Maria Lindström	(Czechoslovakia) Olga Votavová	4–6, 6–3, 7–5
1986	(Sweden) Catarina Lindqvist	(Sweden) Catrin Jexell	6–2, 6–0
1987	(Italy) Sandra Cecchini	(Sweden) Catarina Lindqvist	6–4, 6–4
1988	(West Germany) Isabel Cueto	(Italy) Sandra Cecchini	7–5, 6–1
1989	(Bulgaria) Katerina Maleeva	(Germany) Sabine Hack	6–1, 6–3
1990	(Italy) Sandra Cecchini (2)	(Switzerland) Csilla Bartos	6–1, 6–2
1991–2008 not held
2009	(Spain) María José Martínez Sánchez	(Denmark) Caroline Wozniacki	7–5, 6–4
2010	(France) Aravane Rezaï	(Argentina) Gisela Dulko	6–3, 4–6, 6–4
2011	(Slovenia) Polona Hercog	(Sweden) Johanna Larsson	6–4, 7–5
2012	(Slovenia) Polona Hercog (2)	(France) Mathilde Johansson	0–6, 6–4, 7–5
2013	(United States) Serena Williams	(Sweden) Johanna Larsson	6–4, 6–1
2014	(Germany) Mona Barthel	(South Africa) Chanelle Scheepers	6–3, 7–6^{(7–3)}
2015	(Sweden) Johanna Larsson	(Germany) Mona Barthel	6–3, 7–6^{(7–2)}
2016	(Germany) Laura Siegemund	(Czech Republic) Kateřina Siniaková	7–5, 6–1
2017	(Czech Republic) Kateřina Siniaková	(Denmark) Caroline Wozniacki	6–3, 6–4
2018 not held
↓ WTA 125K series tournament ↓
2019	(Japan) Misaki Doi	(Montenegro) Danka Kovinić	6–4, 6–4
2020	Cancelled due to the COVID-19 pandemic		
2021	(Spain) Nuria Párrizas Díaz	(Belarus) Olga Govortsova	6–2, 6–2
2022	(South Korea) Jang Su-jeong	(Spain) Rebeka Masarova	3–6, 6–3, 6–1
2023	(Serbia) Olga Danilović	(United States) Emma Navarro	7–6^{(7–4)}, 3–6, 6–3
2024	(Italy) Martina Trevisan	(United States) Ann Li	6–2, 6–2
2025	(Italy) Elisabetta Cocciaretto	(Poland) Katarzyna Kawa	6–3, 6–4
2026	(Spain) Paula Badosa	(Switzerland) Simona Waltert	7–5, 7–5

=== Women's doubles ===
Year	Champions	Runners-up	Score
2009	(Argentina) Gisela Dulko (Italy) Flavia Pennetta	(Spain) Nuria Llagostera Vives (Spain) María José Martínez Sánchez	6–2, 0–6, 10–5
2010	(Argentina) Gisela Dulko (2) (Italy) Flavia Pennetta (2)	(Czech Republic) Renata Voráčová (Czech Republic) Barbora Záhlavová-Strýcová	7–6^{(7–0)}, 6–0
2011	(Spain) Lourdes Domínguez Lino (Spain) María José Martínez Sánchez	(Spain) Nuria Llagostera Vives (Spain) Arantxa Parra Santonja	6–3, 6–3
2012	(Colombia) Catalina Castaño (Colombia) Mariana Duque Mariño	(Czech Republic) Eva Hrdinová (Bosnia and Herzegovina) Mervana Jugić-Salkić	4–6, 7–5, [10–5]
2013	(Spain) Anabel Medina Garrigues (Czech Republic) Klára Zakopalová	(Romania) Alexandra Dulgheru (Italy) Flavia Pennetta	6–1, 6–4
2014	(Slovenia) Andreja Klepač (Spain) María Teresa Torró Flor	(United Kingdom) Jocelyn Rae (United Kingdom) Anna Smith	6–1, 6–1
2015	(Netherlands) Kiki Bertens (Sweden) Johanna Larsson	(Germany) Tatjana Maria (Ukraine) Olga Savchuk	7–5, 6–4
2016	(Romania) Andreea Mitu (Poland) Alicja Rosolska	(Netherlands) Lesley Kerkhove (Belarus) Lidziya Marozava	6–3, 7–5
2017	(Netherlands) Quirine Lemoine (Netherlands) Arantxa Rus	(Argentina) María Irigoyen (Czech Republic) Barbora Krejčíková	3–6, 6–3, [10–8]
2018 not held
↓ WTA 125K series tournament ↓
2019	(Japan) Misaki Doi (Russia) Natalia Vikhlyantseva	(Chile) Alexa Guarachi (Montenegro) Danka Kovinić	7–5, 6–7^{(4–7)}, [10–7]
2020	Cancelled due to the COVID-19 pandemic		
2021	(Sweden) Mirjam Björklund (Switzerland) Leonie Küng	(Slovakia) Tereza Mihalíková (Russia) Kamilla Rakhimova	5–7, 6–3, [10–5]
2022	(Japan) Misaki Doi (2) (Sweden) Rebecca Peterson	(Romania) Mihaela Buzărnescu; Irina Khromacheva	walkover
2023	Irina Khromacheva (Hungary) Panna Udvardy	(Japan) Eri Hozumi (South Korea) Jang Su-jeong	4–6, 6–3, [10–5]
2024	(Thailand) Peangtarn Plipuech (Chinese Taipei) Tsao Chia-yi	(Argentina) María Lourdes Carlé (Argentina) Julia Riera	7–5, 6–3
2025	(Czech Republic) Jesika Malečková (Czech Republic) Miriam Škoch	(Spain) Irene Burillo (Turkey) Berfu Cengiz	6–4, 6–3
2026	(Colombia) Emiliana Arango (Switzerland) Simona Waltert	(United Kingdom) Alicia Barnett (France) Elixane Lechemia	6–4, 6–1

== See also ==
- Category:National and multi-national tennis tournaments

Awards and achievements
Preceded by Shanghai	ATP World Tour 250 Tournament of the Year; 2002–2012 (In 2003 and 2004 shared with Houston)	Succeeded by Queen's Club Championships
