= 2017 Estoril Open =

- Date: 29 April – 7 May
- Edition: 3rd
- Draw: 28S / 16D
- Prize money: €482,060
- Surface: Clay
- Location: Cascais, Portugal
- Venue: Clube de Ténis do Estoril

Champions

Singles
- (Spain) Pablo Carreño Busta

Doubles
- (United States) Ryan Harrison / (New Zealand) Michael Venus
← 2016 ·	Estoril Open (tennis)	· 2018 →

The 2017 Estoril Open (also known as the Millennium Estoril Open for sponsorship purposes) was a professional men's tennis tournament played on outdoor clay courts. It was the third edition of the Estoril Open, and part of the ATP World Tour 250 series of the 2017 ATP World Tour. The event took place at the Clube de Ténis do Estoril in Cascais, Portugal, from 29 April to 7 May 2017.

== Singles main-draw entrants ==
=== Seeds ===
Country	Player	Rank^{1}	Seed
ESP	Pablo Carreño Busta	20	1
FRA	Richard Gasquet	23	2
LUX	Gilles Müller	28	3
ESP	David Ferrer	32	4
ARG	Juan Martín del Potro	33	5
POR	João Sousa	37	6
GBR	Kyle Edmund	42	7
FRA	Benoît Paire	49	8

- Rankings are as of April 24, 2017.

=== Other entrants ===
The following players received wildcards into the singles main draw:

- (Spain) David Ferrer
- (Portugal) Frederico Ferreira Silva
- (Portugal) Pedro Sousa

The following players received entry using a protected ranking into the singles main draw:

- (Spain) Tommy Robredo

The following players received entry from the qualifying draw:

- (Italy) Salvatore Caruso
- (Portugal) João Domingues
- (United States) Bjorn Fratangelo
- (Sweden) Elias Ymer

=== Withdrawals ===
Before the tournament

- (Argentina) Federico Delbonis →replaced by (Spain) Guillermo García López
- (Australia) Nick Kyrgios →replaced by (Argentina) Renzo Olivo
- (Russia) Daniil Medvedev →replaced by (Russia) Evgeny Donskoy
- (Argentina) Juan Mónaco →replaced by (Portugal) Gastão Elias
- (Japan) Yoshihito Nishioka →replaced by (South Africa) Kevin Anderson
- (Spain) Albert Ramos Viñolas →replaced by (Japan) Yūichi Sugita

During the tournament

- (Argentina) Juan Martín del Potro

== Doubles main-draw entrants ==
=== Seeds ===
Country	Player	Country	Player	Rank^{1}	Seed
AUS	Sam Groth	SWE	Robert Lindstedt	95	1
NED	Wesley Koolhof	NED	Matwé Middelkoop	101	2
NZL	Marcus Daniell	BRA	Marcelo Demoliner	102	3
IND	Leander Paes	BRA	André Sá	114	4

- Rankings are as of April 24, 2017.

=== Other entrants ===
The following pairs received wildcards into the doubles main draw:

- (Portugal) Felipe Cunha-Silva / (Portugal) Fred Gil
- (Portugal) Gastão Elias / (Portugal) Frederico Ferreira Silva

== Champions ==
=== Singles ===
- (Spain) Pablo Carreño Busta def. (Luxembourg) Gilles Müller, 6–2, 7–6^{(7–5)}

=== Doubles ===
- (United States) Ryan Harrison / (New Zealand) Michael Venus def. (Spain) David Marrero / (Spain) Tommy Robredo, 7–5, 6–2
