= 2017 Estoril Open – Doubles =

Doubles
- 2017 Estoril Open

Final
- Champions: (United States) Ryan Harrison (New Zealand) Michael Venus
- Runners-up: (Spain) David Marrero (Spain) Tommy Robredo
- Score: 7–5, 6–2

Events
Singles	Doubles
← 2016 ·	Estoril Open	· 2018 →

Eric Butorac and Scott Lipsky were the defending champions, but Butorac retired from professional tennis in September 2016 and Lipsky chose to compete in Istanbul instead.

Ryan Harrison and Michael Venus won the title, defeating David Marrero and Tommy Robredo in the final, 7–5, 6–2.

== Seeds ==
1. (Australia) Sam Groth / (Sweden) Robert Lindstedt (first round)
2. (Netherlands) Wesley Koolhof / (Netherlands) Matwé Middelkoop (first round)
3. (New Zealand) Marcus Daniell / (Brazil) Marcelo Demoliner (first round)
4. (India) Leander Paes / (Brazil) André Sá (quarterfinals)

== Draw ==
=== Key ===
- Q = Qualifier
- WC = Wild card
- LL = Lucky loser
- Alt = Alternate
- SE = Special exempt
- PR = Protected ranking
- ITF = ITF entry
- JE = Junior exempt
- w/o = Walkover
- r = Retired
- d = Defaulted
- SR = Special ranking

=== Draw ===
First round
1	(Australia) S Groth (Sweden) R Lindstedt	3	7	4
(United States) R Harrison (New Zealand) M Venus	6	5	[10]
(Argentina) C Berlocq (Peru) S Galdós	6	7^{8}
(United States) E Escobedo (Brazil) F Neis	0	6^{6}
3	(New Zealand) M Daniell (Brazil) M Demoliner	0	6^{4}
(India) P Raja (India) D Sharan	6	7^{7}
WC	(Portugal) G Elias (Portugal) F Ferreira Silva	3	6^{6}
(Uruguay) A Behar (Belarus) A Bury	6	7^{8}
(United Kingdom) K Edmund (Portugal) J Sousa	7^{7}	6^{8}	[11]
(Spain) N Almagro (Spain) G García López	6^{1}	7^{10}	[13]
(Argentina) R Olivo (France) B Paire	6^{1}	2
4	(India) L Paes (Brazil) A Sá	7^{7}	6
WC	(Portugal) F Cunha e Silva (Portugal) F Gil	3	3
PR	(Spain) D Marrero (Spain) T Robredo	6	6
(Tunisia) M Jaziri (Luxembourg) G Müller	4	6	[11]
2	(Netherlands) W Koolhof (Netherlands) M Middelkoop	6	3	[9]

Quarterfinals
(United States) R Harrison (New Zealand) M Venus	6	6
(Argentina) C Berlocq (Peru) S Galdós	4	3
(India) P Raja (India) D Sharan	5	3
(Uruguay) A Behar (Belarus) A Bury	7	6
(Spain) N Almagro (Spain) G García López	7^{7}	4	[10]
4	(India) L Paes (Brazil) A Sá	6^{2}	6	[8]
PR	(Spain) D Marrero (Spain) T Robredo	3	6	[10]
(Tunisia) M Jaziri (Luxembourg) G Müller	6	0	[8]

Semifinals
(United States) R Harrison (New Zealand) M Venus	4	7^{9}	[10]
(Uruguay) A Behar (Belarus) A Bury	6	6^{7}	[3]
(Spain) N Almagro (Spain) G García López	4	6	[8]
PR	(Spain) D Marrero (Spain) T Robredo	6	4	[10]

Final
(United States) R Harrison (New Zealand) M Venus	7	6
PR	(Spain) D Marrero (Spain) T Robredo	5	2
