= 2016 Estoril Open =

- Date: 25 April – 1 May
- Edition: 2nd
- Draw: 28S / 16D
- Prize money: €463,520
- Surface: Clay
- Location: Cascais, Portugal
- Venue: Clube de Ténis do Estoril

Champions

Singles
- (Spain) Nicolás Almagro

Doubles
- (United States) Eric Butorac / (United States) Scott Lipsky
← 2015 ·	Estoril Open (tennis)	· 2017 →

The 2016 Estoril Open (also known as the Millennium Estoril Open for sponsorship purposes) was a tennis tournament played on outdoor clay courts. It was the second edition of the Estoril Open, and part of the ATP World Tour 250 series of the 2016 ATP World Tour. The event took place at the Clube de Ténis do Estoril in Cascais, Portugal, from 25 April until 1 May 2016. Unseeded Nicolás Almagro won the singles title.

== Finals ==
=== Singles ===
- (Spain) Nicolás Almagro defeated (Spain) Pablo Carreño Busta, 6–7^{(6–8)}, 7–6^{(7–5)}, 6–3

=== Doubles ===
- (United States) Eric Butorac / (United States) Scott Lipsky defeated (Poland) Łukasz Kubot / (Poland) Marcin Matkowski, 6–4, 3–6, [10–8]

== Singles main draw entrants ==
=== Seeds ===
Country	Player	Rank^{1}	Seed
FRA	Gilles Simon	18	1
AUS	Nick Kyrgios	20	2
FRA	Benoît Paire	22	3
POR	João Sousa	34	4
ESP	Guillermo García-López	37	5
CRO	Borna Ćorić	41	6
ARG	Leonardo Mayer	45	7
ESP	Pablo Carreño Busta	49	8

- Rankings are as of April 18, 2016.

=== Other entrants ===
The following players received wildcards into the singles main draw:

- (Portugal) Frederico Ferreira Silva
- (Portugal) Pedro Sousa
- (Spain) Fernando Verdasco

The following players received entry from the qualifying draw:

- (Italy) Andrea Arnaboldi
- (Canada) Steven Diez
- (France) Stéphane Robert
- (Sweden) Elias Ymer

=== Withdrawals ===
- (Luxembourg) Gilles Müller → replaced by (Spain) Daniel Gimeno-Traver
- (Spain) Tommy Robredo → replaced by (Germany) Benjamin Becker
- (France) Jo-Wilfried Tsonga → replaced by (Germany) Michael Berrer
- (Russia) Dmitry Tursunov → replaced by (Brazil) Rogério Dutra Silva

== Doubles main draw entrants ==
=== Seeds ===
Country	Player	Country	Player	Rank^{1}	Seed
POL	Łukasz Kubot	POL	Marcin Matkowski	45	1
PHI	Treat Huey	BLR	Max Mirnyi	49	2
~~ESP~~	~~Marc López~~	~~ESP~~	~~David Marrero~~	~~62~~	~~3~~
USA	Eric Butorac	USA	Scott Lipsky	91	4
ISR	Jonathan Erlich	GBR	Colin Fleming	107	5

- Rankings are as of April 18, 2016.

=== Other entrants ===
The following pairs received wildcards into the doubles main draw:

- (Portugal) Felipe Cunha e Silva / (Portugal) Frederico Gil
- (United Kingdom) Kyle Edmund / (Portugal) Frederico Ferreira Silva

The following pair received entry as alternates:

- (Portugal) Rui Machado / (Portugal) Pedro Sousa

=== Withdrawals ===
Before the tournament

- (Spain) Marc López (abductor injury)
