= 2015 Estoril Open – Singles =

Singles
- 2015 Estoril Open

Final
- Champion: (France) Richard Gasquet
- Runner-up: (Australia) Nick Kyrgios
- Score: 6–3, 6–2

Events
| Singles | Doubles |
| ← 2014 · | Estoril Open | · 2016 → |

Richard Gasquet won the title, defeating Nick Kyrgios in the final, 6–3, 6–2.

== Seeds ==
The top four seeds receive a bye into the second round.

1. (Spain) Feliciano López (second round)
2. (South Africa) Kevin Anderson (second round)
3. (Spain) Tommy Robredo (withdrew)
4. (Argentina) Leonardo Mayer (second round)
5. (France) Richard Gasquet (champion)
6. (France) Jérémy Chardy (first round)
7. (Australia) Nick Kyrgios (final)
8. (Luxembourg) Gilles Müller (quarterfinals)

== Draw ==
=== Key ===
- Q = Qualifier
- WC = Wild card
- LL = Lucky loser
- Alt = Alternate
- SE = Special exempt
- PR = Protected ranking
- ITF = ITF entry
- JE = Junior exempt
- w/o = Walkover
- r = Retired
- d = Defaulted
- SR = Special ranking

=== Finals ===
Semifinals
7 | (Australia) Nick Kyrgios | 5 | 7^{7} | 6
(Spain) Pablo Carreño Busta | 7 | 6^{2} | 3
5 | (France) Richard Gasquet | 3 | 6 | 7^{7}
(Spain) Guillermo García López | 6 | 2 | 6^{1}

Final
7 | (Australia) Nick Kyrgios | 3 | 2
5 | (France) Richard Gasquet | 6 | 6

=== Top half ===
First round
(Lithuania) R Berankis | 3 | 7^{8} | 4
(Netherlands) R Haase | 6 | 6^{6} | 6
(Serbia) F Krajinović | 6 | 6
(Colombia) A González | 3 | 3
(Spain) A Ramos Viñolas | 3 | 7^{7} | 6^{3}
7 | (Australia) N Kyrgios | 6 | 6^{5} | 7^{7}
(Spain) P Carreño Busta | 6 | 6
Q | (France) C Lestienne | 3 | 1
Q | (Austria) M Fischer | 4 | 6 | 3
(Spain) A Montañés | 6 | 4 | 6
WC | (Portugal) FF Silva | 3 | 6 | 1
8 | (Luxembourg) G Müller | 6 | 3 | 6

Second round
1 | (Spain) F López | 6 | 6^{2} | 4
(Netherlands) R Haase | 4 | 7^{7} | 6
(Serbia) F Krajinović | 3 | 3
7 | (Australia) N Kyrgios | 6 | 6
LL | (Spain) D Vega Hernández | 1 | 2
(Spain) P Carreño Busta | 6 | 6
(Spain) A Montañés | 6 | 3 | 6^{7}
8 | (Luxembourg) G Müller | 4 | 6 | 7^{9}

Quarterfinals
(Netherlands) R Haase | 3 | 4
7 | (Australia) N Kyrgios | 6 | 6
(Spain) P Carreño Busta | 6 | 6
8 | (Luxembourg) G Müller | 2 | 4

Semifinals
7 | (Australia) N Kyrgios | 5 | 7^{7} | 6
(Spain) P Carreño Busta | 7 | 6^{2} | 3

=== Bottom half ===
First round
5 | (France) R Gasquet | 7^{9} | 6
(Australia) M Matosevic | 6^{7} | 1
Q | (France) K de Schepper | 6 | 2 | 6
WC | (Portugal) G Elias | 2 | 6 | 3
PR | (France) S Robert | 3 | 6^{4}
(Spain) N Almagro | 6 | 7^{7}
6 | (France) J Chardy | 2 | 4
(Croatia) B Ćorić | 6 | 6
WC | (Portugal) R Machado | 7^{7} | 6
(Portugal) J Sousa | 6^{5} | 3
Q | (Spain) R Carballés Baena | 2 | 2
(Spain) G García López | 6 | 6

Second round
5 | (France) R Gasquet | 6 | 6
Q | (France) K de Schepper | 2 | 3
(Spain) N Almagro | 7^{7} | 6
4 | (Argentina) L Mayer | 6^{4} | 2
(Croatia) B Ćorić | 6 | 5 | 6
WC | (Portugal) R Machado | 4 | 7 | 1
(Spain) G García López | 6 | 3 | 6
2 | (South Africa) K Anderson | 4 | 6 | 1

Quarterfinals
5 | (France) R Gasquet | 6 | 7^{7}
(Spain) N Almagro | 1 | 6^{4}
(Croatia) B Ćorić | 3 | 6^{4}
(Spain) G García López | 6 | 7^{7}

Semifinals
5 | (France) R Gasquet | 3 | 6 | 7^{7}
(Spain) G García López | 6 | 2 | 6^{1}

== Qualifying ==
=== Seeds ===
1. (France) Kenny de Schepper (qualified)
2. (Romania) Victor Hănescu (second round)
3. (Belgium) Niels Desein (second round)
4. (Spain) Roberto Carballés Baena (qualified)
5. (France) Constant Lestienne (qualified)
6. (Spain) Gerard Granollers (qualifying competition)
7. (Austria) Martin Fischer (qualified)
8. (Spain) David Vega Hernández (qualifying competition, lucky loser)

=== Qualifiers ===
1. (France) Kenny de Schepper
2. (France) Constant Lestienne
3. (Austria) Martin Fischer
4. (Spain) Roberto Carballés Baena

=== Lucky losers ===
1. (Spain) David Vega Hernández

=== Qualifying draw ===
==== First qualifier ====
First round
(Portugal) João Domingues | 4 | 6 | 5
(Portugal) André Gaspar Murta | 6 | 2 | 7
(Venezuela) Jordi Muñoz Abreu | 6 | 6
WC | (Portugal) João António | 3 | 0
WC | (Portugal) Gonçalo Andrade | 4 | 1
8 | (Spain) David Vega Hernández | 6 | 6

Second round
1 | (France) Kenny de Schepper | 4 | 6 | 6
(Portugal) André Gaspar Murta | 6 | 2 | 3
(Venezuela) Jordi Muñoz Abreu | 4 | 3
8 | (Spain) David Vega Hernández | 6 | 6

Qualifying competition
1 | (France) Kenny de Schepper | 6 | 6
8 | (Spain) David Vega Hernández | 2 | 2

==== Second qualifier ====
| First round | | | | Second round | | | | | Qualifying competition |
| | | | | 2 | (Romania) Victor Hănescu | 1 | 7^{7} | 3 |
| (Portugal) Pedro Sousa | 6 | 7^{7} | | | (Portugal) Pedro Sousa | 6 | 6^{2} | 6 |
| (Portugal) Artur Completo | 4 | 6^{5} | | | | | | | | (Portugal) Pedro Sousa | 5 | 6^{3} |
| (Portugal) Gonçalo Falcão | 3 | 6 | 6 | | | | | | 5 | (France) Constant Lestienne | 7 | 7^{7} |
| (Portugal) Felipe Cunha e Silva | 6 | 3 | 4 | | (Portugal) Gonçalo Falcão | 0 | 0 |
| | | | | 5 | (France) Constant Lestienne | 6 | 6 |

==== Third qualifier ====
First round
(Portugal) Duarte Vale | 1 | 1
(Portugal) Frederico Gil | 6 | 6
(Portugal) Nuno Deus | 6 | 6^{5} | 6
(Portugal) José-Ricardo Nunes | 2 | 7^{7} | 2
(Portugal) Romain Barbosa | 2 | 6^{4}
7 | (Austria) Martin Fischer | 6 | 7^{7}

Second round
3 | (Belgium) Niels Desein | 3 | 4
(Portugal) Frederico Gil | 6 | 6
(Portugal) Nuno Deus | 4 | 1
7 | (Austria) Martin Fischer | 6 | 6

Qualifying competition
(Portugal) Frederico Gil | 6 | 3 | 4
7 | (Austria) Martin Fischer | 4 | 6 | 6

==== Fourth qualifier ====
| First round | | | | Second round | | | | | Qualifying competition |
| | | | | 4 | (Spain) Roberto Carballés Baena | 6 | 6 |
| WC | (Portugal) Miguel Semedo | 0 | 0 | | (France) Yannick Thivant | 0 | 3 |
| | (France) Yannick Thivant | 6 | 6 | | | | | | 4 | (Spain) Roberto Carballés Baena | 6 | 6 |
| WC | (Portugal) Tiago Lourenço | 2 | 1 | | | | | | 6 | (Spain) Gerard Granollers | 0 | 3 |
| | (Spain) David Marrero | 6 | 6 | | (Spain) David Marrero | 6 | 1 | 0 |
| | | | | 6 | (Spain) Gerard Granollers | 3 | 6 | 6 |
