= 2016 Estoril Open – Singles =

Singles
- 2016 Estoril Open

Final
- Champion: (Spain) Nicolás Almagro
- Runner-up: (Spain) Pablo Carreño Busta
- Score: 6–7^{(6–8)}, 7–6^{(7–5)}, 6–3

Details
- Draw: 28
- Seeds: 8

Events
Singles	Doubles
← 2015 ·	Estoril Open	· 2017 →

Richard Gasquet was the defending champion, but chose not to participate this year.

Nicolás Almagro won the title, defeating Pablo Carreño Busta in the final, 6–7^{(6–8)}, 7–6^{(7–5)}, 6–3.

== Seeds ==
The top four seeds receive a bye into the second round.

1. (France) Gilles Simon (quarterfinals)
2. (Australia) Nick Kyrgios (semifinals)
3. (France) Benoît Paire (semifinals)
4. (Portugal) João Sousa (second round)
5. (Spain) Guillermo García López (quarterfinals)
6. (Croatia) Borna Ćorić (quarterfinals)
7. (Argentina) Leonardo Mayer (quarterfinals)
8. (Spain) Pablo Carreño Busta (final)

== Draw ==
=== Key ===
- Q = Qualifier
- WC = Wild card
- LL = Lucky loser
- Alt = Alternate
- SE = Special exempt
- PR = Protected ranking
- ITF = ITF entry
- JE = Junior exempt
- w/o = Walkover
- r = Retired
- d = Defaulted
- SR = Special ranking

=== Finals ===
Semifinals
8	(Spain) Pablo Carreño Busta	6	6
3	(France) Benoît Paire	3	3
(Spain) Nicolás Almagro	6	7
2	(Australia) Nick Kyrgios	3	5

Final
8	(Spain) Pablo Carreño Busta	7^{8}	6^{5}	3
(Spain) Nicolás Almagro	6^{6}	7^{7}	6

=== Top half ===
First round
(Portugal) G Elias	3	4
(France) P-H Mathieu	6	6
(Japan) T Daniel	7	6
Q	(Canada) S Diez	5	1
WC	(Spain) F Verdasco	1	3
8	(Spain) P Carreño Busta	6	6
(United Kingdom) K Edmund	6	7
(Spain) D Gimeno Traver	3	5
(Italy) T Fabbiano	2	2
Q	(France) S Robert	6	6
(Germany) M Berrer	3	6^{3}
5	(Spain) G García López	6	7^{7}

Second round
1	(France) G Simon	3	6	6
(France) P-H Mathieu	6	2	1
(Japan) T Daniel	4	5
8	(Spain) P Carreño Busta	6	7
3	(France) B Paire	6^{4}	6	6
(United Kingdom) K Edmund	7^{7}	3	3
Q	(France) S Robert	3	6^{3}
5	(Spain) G García López	6	7^{7}

Quarterfinals
1	(France) G Simon	3	4
8	(Spain) P Carreño Busta	6	6
3	(France) B Paire	7^{7}	6
5	(Spain) G García López	6^{2}	2

Semifinals
8	(Spain) P Carreño Busta	6	6
3	(France) B Paire	3	3

=== Bottom half ===
First round
7	(Argentina) L Mayer	6	6
WC	(Portugal) P Sousa	1	4
(Italy) P Lorenzi	7^{7}	6
Q	(Sweden) E Ymer	6^{4}	3
WC	(Portugal) FF Silva	3	2
(Spain) N Almagro	6	6
6	(Croatia) B Ćorić	6	6
Q	(Italy) A Arnaboldi	4	1
(Germany) B Becker	4	1
(Brazil) R Dutra Silva	6	6
(Spain) D Muñoz de la Nava	4	1
(Spain) Í Cervantes	6	6

Second round
7	(Argentina) L Mayer	7^{7}	6
(Italy) P Lorenzi	6^{5}	4
(Spain) N Almagro	4	6	6
4	(Portugal) J Sousa	6	1	2
6	(Croatia) B Ćorić	6	4	6
(Brazil) R Dutra Silva	3	6	1
(Spain) Í Cervantes	6^{4}	5
2	(Australia) N Kyrgios	7^{7}	7

Quarterfinals
7	(Argentina) L Mayer	4	6^{5}
(Spain) N Almagro	6	7^{7}
6	(Croatia) B Ćorić	4	4
2	(Australia) N Kyrgios	6	6

Semifinals
(Spain) N Almagro	6	7
2	(Australia) N Kyrgios	3	5

== Qualifying ==
=== Seeds ===
1. (Spain) Albert Montañés (first round)
2. (France) Stéphane Robert (qualified)
3. (Sweden) Elias Ymer (qualified)
4. (Italy) Luca Vanni (first round)
5. (France) Kenny de Schepper (first round)
6. (Croatia) Franko Škugor (qualifying competition)
7. (Italy) Andrea Arnaboldi (qualified)
8. (Argentina) Marco Trungelliti (qualifying competition)

=== Qualifiers ===
1. (Italy) Andrea Arnaboldi
2. (France) Stéphane Robert
3. (Sweden) Elias Ymer
4. (Canada) Steven Diez

=== Qualifying draw ===
==== First qualifier ====
First round
1	(Spain) Albert Montañés	3	6	4
(Italy) Salvatore Caruso	6	4	6
(Spain) Gerard Granollers	7^{7}	3	1
7	(Italy) Andrea Arnaboldi	6^{2}	6	6

Qualifying competition
(Italy) Salvatore Caruso	6	6^{6}	3
7	(Italy) Andrea Arnaboldi	4	7^{8}	6

==== Second qualifier ====
First round
2	(France) Stéphane Robert	7	7^{7}
(France) Alexandre Sidorenko	5	6^{4}
(Uzbekistan) Farrukh Dustov	6	1	7
5	(France) Kenny de Schepper	3	6	5

Qualifying competition
2	(France) Stéphane Robert	3	6	6
(Uzbekistan) Farrukh Dustov	6	4	1

==== Third qualifier ====
First round
3	(Sweden) Elias Ymer	6	5	6
WC	(Portugal) Rui Machado	1	7	1
WC	(Portugal) João Domingues	1	6	6^{6}
6	(Croatia) Franko Škugor	6	2	7^{8}

Qualifying competition
3	(Sweden) Elias Ymer	4	6	6
6	(Croatia) Franko Škugor	6	1	4

==== Fourth qualifier ====
First round
4	(Italy) Luca Vanni	1	2
(Canada) Steven Diez	6	6
(France) Édouard Roger-Vasselin	6	5	0^{r}
8	(Argentina) Marco Trungelliti	4	7	0

Qualifying competition
(Canada) Steven Diez	6	6
8	(Argentina) Marco Trungelliti	3	2
