= 2018 Estoril Open – Doubles =

Doubles
- 2018 Estoril Open

Final
- Champions: (United Kingdom) Kyle Edmund (United Kingdom) Cameron Norrie
- Runners-up: (Netherlands) Wesley Koolhof (New Zealand) Artem Sitak
- Score: 6–4, 6–2

Events
Singles	Doubles
← 2017 ·	Estoril Open	· 2019 →

Ryan Harrison and Michael Venus were the defending champions, but Harrison chose not to participate this year. Venus played alongside Raven Klaasen, but lost in the first round to Alex de Minaur and Lleyton Hewitt.

Kyle Edmund and Cameron Norrie won the title, defeating Wesley Koolhof and Artem Sitak in the final, 6–4, 6–2.

== Seeds ==
1. (Australia) John Peers / (Netherlands) Jean-Julien Rojer (quarterfinals)
2. (South Africa) Raven Klaasen / (New Zealand) Michael Venus (first round)
3. (Spain) Marc López / (Spain) David Marrero (first round)
4. (Brazil) Marcelo Demoliner / (Mexico) Santiago González (first round)

== Draw ==
=== Key ===
- Q = Qualifier
- WC = Wild card
- LL = Lucky loser
- Alt = Alternate
- ITF = ITF entry
- PR = Protected ranking
- SR = Special ranking
- SE = Special exempt
- JE = Junior exempt
- JR = Junior Accelerator Programme entrant
- CO = College Accelerator Programme entrant
- NG = Next Gen Accelerator Program entrant
- w/o = Walkover
- r = Retired
- d = Defaulted

=== Draw ===
First round
1	(Australia) J Peers (Netherlands) J-J Rojer	6	7^{7}
(Argentina) G Durán (Argentina) A Molteni	2	6^{2}
(France) J Eysseric (United Kingdom) J Salisbury	6	3	[10]
(Netherlands) S Arends (Canada) A Shamasdin	3	6	[6]
3	(Spain) M López (Spain) D Marrero	7^{7}	4	[3]
(Netherlands) W Koolhof (New Zealand) A Sitak	6^{5}	6	[10]
(Israel) J Erlich (United States) S Lipsky	6	2	[9]
WC	(Portugal) G Elias (Portugal) P Sousa	2	6	[11]
(Argentina) L Mayer (Portugal) J Sousa	6	7^{7}
(Uruguay) A Behar (Mexico) MÁ Reyes-Varela	4	6^{4}
(Netherlands) R Haase (Netherlands) M Middelkoop	6	6
4	(Brazil) M Demoliner (Mexico) S González	4	4
(Argentina) F Delbonis (Argentina) N Kicker	4	0
(United Kingdom) K Edmund (United Kingdom) C Norrie	6	6
WC	(Australia) A de Minaur (Australia) L Hewitt	6	6
2	(South Africa) R Klaasen (New Zealand) M Venus	4	4

Quarterfinals
1	(Australia) J Peers (Netherlands) J-J Rojer	4	6^{4}
(France) J Eysseric (United Kingdom) J Salisbury	6	7^{7}
(Netherlands) W Koolhof (New Zealand) A Sitak	7^{7}	4	[10]
WC	(Portugal) G Elias (Portugal) P Sousa	6^{2}	6	[8]
(Argentina) L Mayer (Portugal) J Sousa	6	6
(Netherlands) R Haase (Netherlands) M Middelkoop	2	4
(United Kingdom) K Edmund (United Kingdom) C Norrie	6	7^{7}
WC	(Australia) A de Minaur (Australia) L Hewitt	4	6^{4}

Semifinals
(France) J Eysseric (United Kingdom) J Salisbury	5	3
(Netherlands) W Koolhof (New Zealand) A Sitak	7	6
(Argentina) L Mayer (Portugal) J Sousa	2	6^{4}
(United Kingdom) K Edmund (United Kingdom) C Norrie	6	7^{7}

Final
(Netherlands) W Koolhof (New Zealand) A Sitak	4	2
(United Kingdom) K Edmund (United Kingdom) C Norrie	6	6
