= 2016 Estoril Open – Doubles =

Doubles
- 2016 Estoril Open

Final
- Champions: (United States) Eric Butorac (United States) Scott Lipsky
- Runners-up: (Poland) Łukasz Kubot (Poland) Marcin Matkowski
- Score: 6–4, 3–6, [10–8]

Events
Singles	Doubles
← 2015 ·	Estoril Open	· 2017 →

Treat Huey and Scott Lipsky were the defending champions, but chose not to compete together. Huey played alongside Max Mirnyi, but lost in the semifinals to Eric Butorac and Lipsky.
Butorac and Lipsky went on to win the title, defeating Łukasz Kubot and Marcin Matkowski in the final, 6–4, 3–6, [10–8].

== Seeds ==
1. (Poland) Łukasz Kubot / (Poland) Marcin Matkowski (final)
2. (Philippines) Treat Huey / (Belarus) Max Mirnyi (semifinals)
3. (Spain) Marc López / (Spain) David Marrero (withdrew)
4. (United States) Eric Butorac / (United States) Scott Lipsky (champions)
5. (Israel) Jonathan Erlich / (United Kingdom) Colin Fleming (quarterfinals)

== Draw ==
=== Key ===
- Q = Qualifier
- WC = Wild card
- LL = Lucky loser
- Alt = Alternate
- SE = Special exempt
- PR = Protected ranking
- ITF = ITF entry
- JE = Junior exempt
- w/o = Walkover
- r = Retired
- d = Defaulted
- SR = Special ranking

=== Draw ===
First round
1	(Poland) Ł Kubot (Poland) M Matkowski	5	6	[11]
(Japan) T Daniel (Spain) D Gimeno-Traver	7	1	[9]
(Portugal) G Elias (Portugal) J Sousa	6	6
(Brazil) R Dutra Silva (Spain) G García-López	3	0
5	(Israel) J Erlich (United Kingdom) C Fleming	6	6
(Croatia) M Draganja (Pakistan) A-u-H Qureshi	3	2
PR	(Venezuela) R Maytín (Mexico) MÁ Reyes-Varela	7	4	[8]
(Croatia) B Ćorić (Croatia) F Škugor	5	6	[10]
Alt	(Portugal) R Machado (Portugal) P Sousa	4	2
(Spain) P Carreño Busta (Spain) Í Cervantes	6	6
WC	(Portugal) F Cunha e Silva (Portugal) F Gil	4	7^{7}	[6]
4	(United States) E Butorac (United States) S Lipsky	6	6^{3}	[10]
(Sweden) J Brunström (Sweden) A Siljeström	6	3	[6]
WC	(United Kingdom) K Edmund (Portugal) FF Silva	4	6	[10]
(Italy) T Fabbiano (Italy) P Lorenzi	2	3
2	(Philippines) T Huey (Belarus) M Mirnyi	6	6

Quarterfinals
1	(Poland) Ł Kubot (Poland) M Matkowski	3	6	[10]
(Portugal) G Elias (Portugal) J Sousa	6	3	[7]
5	(Israel) J Erlich (United Kingdom) C Fleming	4	4
(Croatia) B Ćorić (Croatia) F Škugor	6	6
(Spain) P Carreño Busta (Spain) Í Cervantes	3	1
4	(United States) E Butorac (United States) S Lipsky	6	6
WC	(United Kingdom) K Edmund (Portugal) FF Silva	4	4
2	(Philippines) T Huey (Belarus) M Mirnyi	6	6

Semifinals
1	(Poland) Ł Kubot (Poland) M Matkowski	6	6
(Croatia) B Ćorić (Croatia) F Škugor	0	2
4	(United States) E Butorac (United States) S Lipsky	6	7
2	(Philippines) T Huey (Belarus) M Mirnyi	4	5

Final
1	(Poland) Ł Kubot (Poland) M Matkowski	4	6	[8]
4	(United States) E Butorac (United States) S Lipsky	6	3	[10]
