= 2018 Estoril Open – Singles =

Singles
- 2018 Estoril Open

Final
- Champion: (Portugal) João Sousa
- Runner-up: (United States) Frances Tiafoe
- Score: 6–4, 6–4

Details
- Draw: 28 (4 Q / 3 WC )
- Seeds: 8

Events
Singles	Doubles
← 2017 ·	Estoril Open	· 2019 →

Pablo Carreño Busta was the defending champion, but lost in the semifinals to Frances Tiafoe.

João Sousa won the title, defeating Tiafoe in the final, 6–4, 6–4.

== Seeds ==
The top four seeds received a bye into the second round.

1. (South Africa) Kevin Anderson (second round)
2. (Spain) Pablo Carreño Busta (semifinals)
3. (United Kingdom) Kyle Edmund (quarterfinals)
4. (Luxembourg) Gilles Müller (second round)
5. (Spain) Albert Ramos Viñolas (first round)
6. (Netherlands) Robin Haase (first round)
7. (Argentina) Leonardo Mayer (first round)
8. (Russia) Daniil Medvedev (first round)

== Draw ==
=== Key ===
- Q = Qualifier
- WC = Wild card
- LL = Lucky loser
- Alt = Alternate
- SE = Special exempt
- PR = Protected ranking
- ITF = ITF entry
- JE = Junior exempt
- w/o = Walkover
- r = Retired
- d = Defaulted
- SR = Special ranking

=== Finals ===
Semifinals
(Greece) Stefanos Tsitsipas	4	6	6^{4}
(Portugal) João Sousa	6	1	7^{7}
(United States) Frances Tiafoe	6	6
2	(Spain) Pablo Carreño Busta	2	3

Final
(Portugal) João Sousa	6	6
(United States) Frances Tiafoe	4	4

=== Top half ===
First round
PR	(Spain) P Andújar	6^{2}	3
(Greece) S Tsitsipas	7^{7}	6
(Spain) R Carballés Baena	7^{7}	6
(United States) B Fratangelo	6^{1}	3
(United Kingdom) C Norrie	6	3	6
6	(Netherlands) R Haase	4	6	3
(Portugal) G Elias	3	1
WC	(Australia) A de Minaur	6	6
(France) G Simon	3	6	6^{4}
WC	(Portugal) P Sousa	6	4	7^{7}
(Portugal) J Sousa	7^{7}	7
8	(Russia) D Medvedev	6^{1}	5

Second round
1	(South Africa) K Anderson	7^{7}	3	3
(Greece) S Tsitsipas	6^{3}	6	6
(Spain) R Carballés Baena	5	6	7^{7}
(United Kingdom) C Norrie	7	2	6^{1}
3	(United Kingdom) K Edmund	6	7
WC	(Australia) A de Minaur	2	5
WC	(Portugal) P Sousa	6	6^{1}	5
(Portugal) J Sousa	4	7^{7}	7

Quarterfinals
(Greece) S Tsitsipas	6^{2}	6	7^{7}
(Spain) R Carballés Baena	7^{7}	2	6^{3}
3	(United Kingdom) K Edmund	3	6	0
(Portugal) J Sousa	6	1	6

Semifinals
(Greece) S Tsitsipas	4	6	6^{4}
(Portugal) J Sousa	6	1	7^{7}

=== Bottom half ===
First round
5	(Spain) A Ramos Viñolas	2	4
(Argentina) F Delbonis	6	6
Q	(Portugal) J Domingues	3	2
Q	(Italy) S Bolelli	6	6
(United States) T Sandgren	6	6^{5}	6^{4}
(United States) F Tiafoe	3	7^{7}	7^{7}
7	(Argentina) L Mayer	6	6^{7}	4
(Chile) N Jarry	3	7^{9}	6
Q	(Spain) R Ojeda Lara	6	7
WC	(Portugal) F Ferreira Silva	4	5
Q	(United States) T Smyczek	2	2
(Argentina) N Kicker	6	6

Second round
(Argentina) F Delbonis	6	5	2
Q	(Italy) S Bolelli	3	7	6
(United States) F Tiafoe	6	7
4	(Luxembourg) G Müller	4	5
(Chile) N Jarry	6	7^{8}
Q	(Spain) R Ojeda Lara	3	6^{6}
(Argentina) N Kicker	1	5
2	(Spain) P Carreño Busta	6	7

Quarterfinals
Q	(Italy) S Bolelli	5	2
(United States) F Tiafoe	7	6
(Chile) N Jarry	2	6	1
2	(Spain) P Carreño Busta	6	2	6

Semifinals
(United States) F Tiafoe	6	6
2	(Spain) P Carreño Busta	2	3

== Qualifying ==
=== Seeds ===
1. (United States) Tim Smyczek (qualified)
2. (France) Corentin Moutet (qualifying competition)
3. (Kazakhstan) Alexander Bublik (first round)
4. (Italy) Simone Bolelli (qualified)
5. (Italy) Alessandro Giannessi (first round)
6. (France) Stéphane Robert (first round)
7. (Spain) Jaume Munar (qualifying competition)
8. (France) Kenny de Schepper (first round)

=== Qualifiers ===
1. (United States) Tim Smyczek
2. (Portugal) João Domingues
3. (Spain) Ricardo Ojeda Lara
4. (Italy) Simone Bolelli

=== Qualifying draw ===
==== First qualifier ====
First round
1	(United States) Tim Smyczek	6	6
WC	(Portugal) Francisco Cabral	2	1
(Portugal) Fred Gil	6	1	6
8	(France) Kenny de Schepper	4	6	4

Qualifying competition
1	(United States) Tim Smyczek	6	6
(Portugal) Fred Gil	4	2

==== Second qualifier ====
First round
2	(France) Corentin Moutet	7^{7}	2	6
(Italy) Salvatore Caruso	6^{3}	6	4
(Portugal) João Domingues	7	6
5	(Italy) Alessandro Giannessi	5	1

Qualifying competition
2	(France) Corentin Moutet	4	6	3
(Portugal) João Domingues	6	2	6

==== Third qualifier ====
First round
3	(Kazakhstan) Alexander Bublik	5	1
(Spain) Ricardo Ojeda Lara	7	6
(Portugal) João Monteiro	6	6^{5}	7^{7}
6	(France) Stéphane Robert	3	7^{7}	6^{4}

Qualifying competition
(Spain) Ricardo Ojeda Lara	6	2	6
(Portugal) João Monteiro	3	6	3

==== Fourth qualifier ====
First round
4	(Italy) Simone Bolelli	6	6
(Canada) Félix Auger-Aliassime	4	1
WC	(Portugal) Tiago Cação	5	3
7	(Spain) Jaume Munar	7	6

Qualifying competition
4	(Italy) Simone Bolelli	6	6
7	(Spain) Jaume Munar	1	4
