= 2018 Estoril Open =

- Date: 30 April – 6 May
- Edition: 4th
- Draw: 28S / 16D
- Prize money: €501,345
- Surface: Clay
- Location: Cascais, Portugal
- Venue: Clube de Ténis do Estoril

Champions

Singles
- (Portugal) João Sousa

Doubles
- (United Kingdom) Kyle Edmund / (United Kingdom) Cameron Norrie
← 2017 ·	Estoril Open (tennis)	· 2019 →

The 2018 Estoril Open (also known as the Millennium Estoril Open for sponsorship purposes) was a professional men's tennis tournament played on outdoor clay courts. It was the fourth edition of the Estoril Open, and part of the ATP World Tour 250 series of the 2018 ATP World Tour. The event took place at the Clube de Ténis do Estoril in Cascais, Portugal, from April 30 through May 6, 2018.

== Singles main-draw entrants ==
=== Seeds ===
Country	Player	Rank^{1}	Seed
RSA	Kevin Anderson	8	1
ESP	Pablo Carreño Busta	11	2
GBR	Kyle Edmund	23	3
LUX	Gilles Müller	28	4
ESP	Albert Ramos Viñolas	40	5
NED	Robin Haase	44	6
ARG	Leonardo Mayer	45	7
RUS	Daniil Medvedev	48	8

- Rankings are as of April 23, 2018.

=== Other entrants ===
The following players received wildcards into the singles main draw:

- (Australia) Alex de Minaur
- (Portugal) Frederico Ferreira Silva
- (Portugal) Pedro Sousa

The following players received entry from the qualifying draw:

- (Italy) Simone Bolelli
- (Portugal) João Domingues
- (Spain) Ricardo Ojeda Lara
- (United States) Tim Smyczek

=== Withdrawals ===
Before the tournament

- (Spain) David Ferrer → replaced by (United Kingdom) Cameron Norrie
- (Australia) Nick Kyrgios → replaced by (Argentina) Nicolás Kicker
- (France) Benoît Paire → replaced by (Portugal) Gastão Elias

== Doubles main-draw entrants ==
=== Seeds ===
Country	Player	Country	Player	Rank^{1}	Seed
AUS	John Peers	NED	Jean-Julien Rojer	17	1
RSA	Raven Klaasen	NZL	Michael Venus	48	2
ESP	Marc López	ESP	David Marrero	67	3
BRA	Marcelo Demoliner	MEX	Santiago González	84	4

- Rankings are as of April 23, 2018.

=== Other entrants ===
The following pairs received wildcards into the doubles main draw:

- (Australia) Alex de Minaur / (Australia) Lleyton Hewitt
- (Portugal) Gastão Elias / (Portugal) Pedro Sousa

== Champions ==
=== Singles ===
- (Portugal) João Sousa def. (United States) Frances Tiafoe, 6–4, 6–4

=== Doubles ===
- (United Kingdom) Kyle Edmund / (United Kingdom) Cameron Norrie def. (Netherlands) Wesley Koolhof / (New Zealand) Artem Sitak, 6–4, 6–2
