= 2015 Estoril Open – Doubles =

Doubles
- 2015 Estoril Open

Final
- Champions: (Philippines) Treat Huey (United States) Scott Lipsky
- Runners-up: (Spain) David Marrero (Spain) Marc López
- Score: 6–1, 6–4

Events
Singles	Doubles
← 2014 ·	Estoril Open	· 2016 →

Treat Huey and Scott Lipsky won the title, defeating Marc López and David Marrero in the final, 6–1, 6–4.

== Seeds ==
1. (Spain) Marc López / (Spain) David Marrero (final)
2. (Philippines) Treat Huey / (United States) Scott Lipsky (champions)
3. (Poland) Mariusz Fyrstenberg / (Belarus) Max Mirnyi (semifinals)
4. (United States) Nicholas Monroe / (New Zealand) Artem Sitak (first round)

== Draw ==
=== Key ===
- Q = Qualifier
- WC = Wild card
- LL = Lucky loser
- Alt = Alternate
- SE = Special exempt
- PR = Protected ranking
- ITF = ITF entry
- JE = Junior exempt
- w/o = Walkover
- r = Retired
- d = Defaulted
- SR = Special ranking

=== Draw ===
First round
1	(Spain) M López (Spain) D Marrero	7^{7}	7
WC	(Portugal) R Machado (Portugal) FF Silva	6^{5}	5
(Argentina) L Mayer (Spain) A Ramos-Viñolas	1	2
(Spain) N Almagro (Spain) G García-López	6	6
3	(Poland) M Fyrstenberg (Belarus) M Mirnyi	4	6	[10]
(Germany) G Kretschmer (Germany) A Satschko	6	4	[4]
(Poland) M Kowalczyk (Slovakia) I Zelenay	6^{5}	6^{7}
(Portugal) G Elias (Portugal) J Sousa	7^{7}	7^{9}
(Luxembourg) G Müller (Pakistan) A-u-H Qureshi	6	6
(China) M Gong (Chinese Taipei) H-y Peng	2	4
(Germany) M Emmrich (Sweden) A Siljeström	6	3	[10]
4	(United States) N Monroe (New Zealand) A Sitak	0	6	[7]
(Spain) P Carreño Busta (Colombia) A González	6	6
(Lithuania) R Berankis (Australia) M Matosevic	3	4
WC	(Portugal) J Domingues (Portugal) P Sousa	3	0
2	(Philippines) T Huey (United States) S Lipsky	6	6

Quarterfinals
1	(Spain) M López (Spain) D Marrero	7^{7}	7^{7}
(Spain) N Almagro (Spain) G García-López	6^{4}	6^{5}
3	(Poland) M Fyrstenberg (Belarus) M Mirnyi	6	6
(Portugal) G Elias (Portugal) J Sousa	4	2
(Luxembourg) G Müller (Pakistan) A-u-H Qureshi	6	6
(Germany) M Emmrich (Sweden) A Siljeström	3	2
(Spain) P Carreño Busta (Colombia) A González	1	2
2	(Philippines) T Huey (United States) S Lipsky	6	6

Semifinals
1	(Spain) M López (Spain) D Marrero	6	6
3	(Poland) M Fyrstenberg (Belarus) M Mirnyi	4	3
(Luxembourg) G Müller (Pakistan) A-u-H Qureshi	6^{3}	3
2	(Philippines) T Huey (United States) S Lipsky	7^{7}	6

Final
1	(Spain) M López (Spain) D Marrero	1	4
2	(Philippines) T Huey (United States) S Lipsky	6	6
