= 2015 Estoril Open =

- Date: 26 April – 3 May
- Edition: 1st
- Draw: 28S / 16D
- Prize money: €439,405
- Surface: Clay
- Location: Cascais, Portugal
- Venue: Clube de Ténis do Estoril

Champions

Singles
- (France) Richard Gasquet

Doubles
- (Philippines) Treat Huey / (United States) Scott Lipsky
- Estoril Open (tennis)

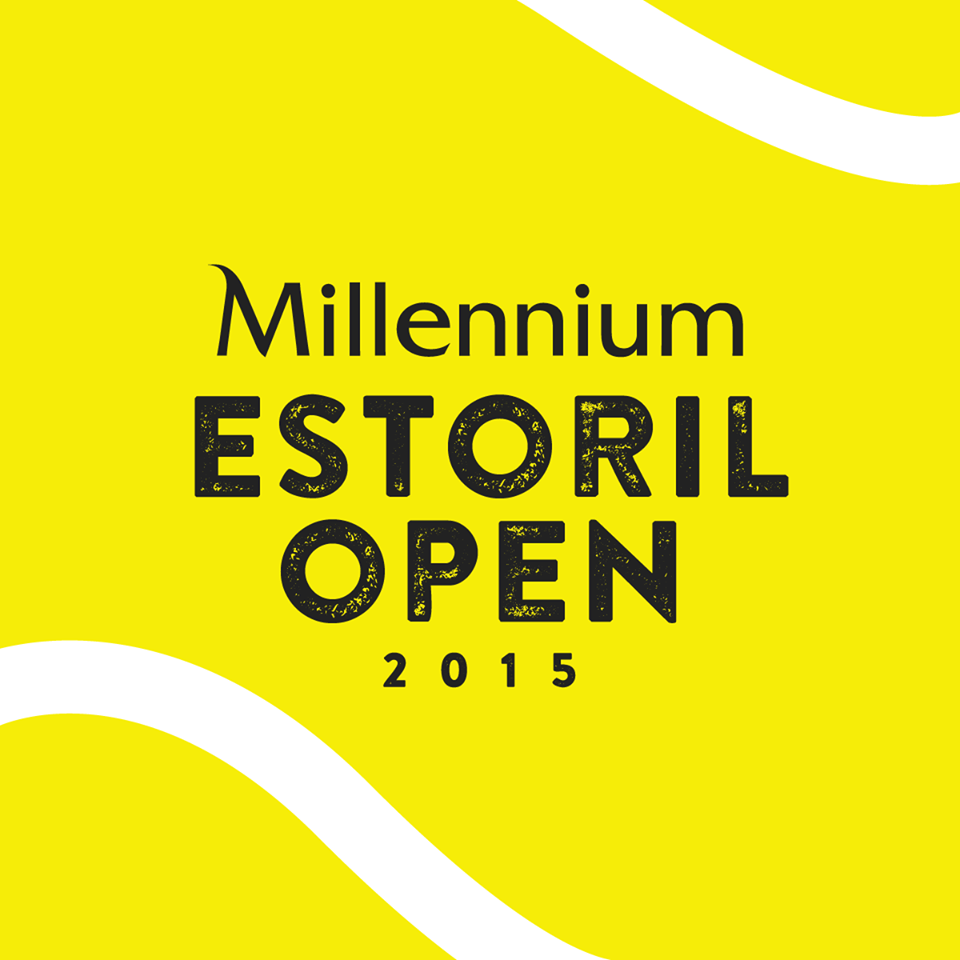
Logo in 20115

The 2015 Estoril Open (also known as the Millennium Estoril Open for sponsorship purposes) was a tennis tournament played on outdoor clay courts. The 2015 tournament was the first edition of the Estoril Open (which replaced the Portugal Open), and part of the ATP World Tour 250 series of the 2015 ATP World Tour. The event took place at the Clube de Ténis do Estoril in Cascais, Portugal, from April 25 through May 3, 2015.

== Singles main draw entrants ==
=== Seeds ===
Country	Player	Rank^{1}	Seed
ESP	Feliciano López	12	1
RSA	Kevin Anderson	17	2
~~ESP~~	~~Tommy Robredo~~	~~20~~	~~3~~
ARG	Leonardo Mayer	24	4
FRA	Richard Gasquet	27	5
FRA	Jérémy Chardy	32	6
AUS	Nick Kyrgios	41	7
LUX	Gilles Müller	42	8

- Rankings are as of April 20, 2015.

=== Other entrants ===
The following players received wildcards into the singles main draw:

- (Portugal) Gastão Elias
- (Portugal) Rui Machado
- (Portugal) Frederico Ferreira Silva

The following players received entry from the qualifying draw:

- (France) Kenny de Schepper
- (France) Constant Lestienne
- (Austria) Martin Fischer
- (Spain) Roberto Carballés Baena

The following player received entry as a lucky loser:

- (Spain) David Vega Hernández

=== Withdrawals ===
Before the tournament

- (Cyprus) Marcos Baghdatis →replaced by Stéphane Robert
- (Argentina) Carlos Berlocq →replaced by Robin Haase
- (France) Adrian Mannarino →replaced by Alejandro González
- (Spain) Tommy Robredo →replaced by David Vega Hernández

== Doubles main draw entrants ==
=== Seeds ===
Country	Player	Country	Player	Rank^{1}	Seed
ESP	Marc López	ESP	David Marrero	43	1
PHI	Treat Huey	USA	Scott Lipsky	92	2
POL	Mariusz Fyrstenberg	BLR	Max Mirnyi	111	3
USA	Nicholas Monroe	NZL	Artem Sitak	116	4

- Rankings are as of April 20, 2015.

=== Other entrants ===
The following pairs received wildcards into the doubles main draw:

- (Portugal) João Domingues / (Portugal) Pedro Sousa
- (Portugal) Rui Machado / (Portugal) Frederico Ferreira Silva

== Champions ==
=== Singles ===
- (France) Richard Gasquet def. (Australia) Nick Kyrgios, 6–3, 6–2

=== Doubles ===
- (Philippines) Treat Huey / (United States) Scott Lipsky def. (Spain) Marc López / (Spain) David Marrero, 6–1, 6–4
