= 2017 Estoril Open – Singles =

Singles
- 2017 Estoril Open

Final
- Champion: (Spain) Pablo Carreño Busta
- Runner-up: (Luxembourg) Gilles Müller
- Score: 6–2, 7–6^{(7–5)}

Details
- Draw: 28 (4 Q / 3 WC )
- Seeds: 8

Events
Singles	Doubles
- Estoril Open

Nicolás Almagro was the defending champion, but lost in the quarterfinals to Pablo Carreño Busta.

Carreño Busta went on to win the title, defeating Gilles Müller in the final, 6–2, 7–6^{(7–5)}.

== Seeds ==
The top four seeds receive a bye into the second round.

1. (Spain) Pablo Carreño Busta (champion)
2. (France) Richard Gasquet (quarterfinals)
3. (Luxembourg) Gilles Müller (final)
4. (Spain) David Ferrer (semifinals)
5. (Argentina) Juan Martín del Potro (second round, withdrew)
6. (Portugal) João Sousa (first round)
7. (United Kingdom) Kyle Edmund (first round)
8. (France) Benoît Paire (first round)

== Draw ==
Key

- Q = Qualifier
- WC = Wild card
- LL = Lucky loser
- Alt = Alternate
- ITF = ITF entry
- PR = Protected ranking
- SR = Special ranking
- SE = Special exempt
- JE = Junior exempt
- JR = Junior Accelerator Programme entrant
- CO = College Accelerator Programme entrant
- NG = Next Gen Accelerator Program entrant
- w/o = Walkover
- r = Retired
- d = Defaulted

=== Finals ===
Semifinals
1	(Spain) Pablo Carreño Busta	6	6
4/WC	(Spain) David Ferrer	3	3
3	(Luxembourg) Gilles Müller	7	6
(South Africa) Kevin Anderson	5	4

Final
1	(Spain) Pablo Carreño Busta	6	7^{7}
3	(Luxembourg) Gilles Müller	2	6^{5}

=== Top half ===
First round
PR	(Spain) T Robredo	6	6
(Russia) E Donskoy	3	2
(Portugal) G Elias	6	3	6
(Tunisia) M Jaziri	4	6	3
(Spain) N Almagro	6	6
8	(France) B Paire	3	2
WC	(Portugal) F Ferreira Silva	6	6
(Uzbekistan) D Istomin	2	2
(United States) R Harrison	6	2	6
(Spain) G García López	3	6	2
(Japan) Y Sugita	1	3
5	(Argentina) JM del Potro	6	6

Second round
1	(Spain) P Carreño Busta	7^{7}	7
PR	(Spain) T Robredo	6^{5}	5
(Portugal) G Elias	1	2
(Spain) N Almagro	6	6
4/WC	(Spain) D Ferrer	6	6
WC	(Portugal) F Ferreira Silva	3	4
(United States) R Harrison	w/o
5	(Argentina) JM del Potro

Quarterfinals
1	(Spain) P Carreño Busta	6	6
(Spain) N Almagro	2	4
4/WC	(Spain) D Ferrer	6	6
(United States) R Harrison	4	0

Semifinals
1	(Spain) P Carreño Busta	6	6
4/WC	(Spain) D Ferrer	3	3

=== Bottom half ===
First round
6	(Portugal) J Sousa	3	4
Q	(United States) B Fratangelo	6	6
(Japan) T Daniel	7^{7}	4	7
(Argentina) R Olivo	6^{2}	6	5
(France) P-H Mathieu	6	4	0^{r}
WC	(Portugal) P Sousa	3	6	0
7	(United Kingdom) K Edmund	4	6	6^{2}
Q	(Portugal) J Domingues	6	3	7^{7}
Q	(Italy) S Caruso	2	3
(South Africa) K Anderson	6	6
(Argentina) C Berlocq	7	6
Q	(Sweden) E Ymer	5	4

Second round
Q	(United States) B Fratangelo	4	4
(Japan) T Daniel	6	6
WC	(Portugal) P Sousa	3	2
3	(Luxembourg) G Müller	6	6
Q	(Portugal) J Domingues	7	3	5
(South Africa) K Anderson	5	6	7
(Argentina) C Berlocq	1	4
2	(France) R Gasquet	6	6

Quarterfinals
(Japan) T Daniel	7	2	3
3	(Luxembourg) G Müller	5	6	6
(South Africa) K Anderson	6	3	7^{7}
2	(France) R Gasquet	2	6	6^{3}

Semifinals
3	(Luxembourg) G Müller	7	6
(South Africa) K Anderson	5	4

== Qualifying ==
=== Seeds ===
1. (United States) Ernesto Escobedo (qualifying competition)
2. (Russia) Andrey Rublev (qualifying competition)
3. (Spain) Íñigo Cervantes (first round)
4. (France) Kenny de Schepper (qualifying competition)
5. (United States) Bjorn Fratangelo (qualified)
6. (Italy) Federico Gaio (first round)
7. (Latvia) Ernests Gulbis (first round, retired)
8. (Sweden) Elias Ymer (qualified)

=== Qualifiers ===
1. (Sweden) Elias Ymer
2. (United States) Bjorn Fratangelo
3. (Portugal) João Domingues
4. (Italy) Salvatore Caruso

=== Qualifying draw ===
==== First qualifier ====
First round
1	(United States) Ernesto Escobedo	6^{3}	6	6
(Chile) Nicolás Jarry	7^{7}	4	4
WC	(Portugal) João Monteiro	5	7^{7}	4
8	(Sweden) Elias Ymer	7	6^{3}	6

Qualifying competition
1	(United States) Ernesto Escobedo	1	4
8	(Sweden) Elias Ymer	6	6

==== Second qualifier ====
First round
2	(Russia) Andrey Rublev	6	7^{7}
(Australia) Sam Groth	2	6^{4}
(Spain) Enrique López Pérez	6	6^{0}	4
5	(United States) Bjorn Fratangelo	3	7^{7}	6

Qualifying competition
2	(Russia) Andrey Rublev	5	3
5	(United States) Bjorn Fratangelo	7	6

==== Third qualifier ====
First round
3	(Spain) Íñigo Cervantes	1	3
WC	(Portugal) Gonçalo Oliveira	6	6
(Portugal) João Domingues	6	0
7	(Latvia) Ernests Gulbis	1	0^{r}

Qualifying competition
WC	(Portugal) Gonçalo Oliveira	4	2
(Portugal) João Domingues	6	6

==== Fourth qualifier ====
First round
4	(France) Kenny de Schepper	7^{7}	6
(France) Tristan Lamasine	6^{5}	2
(Italy) Salvatore Caruso	6	6
6	(Italy) Federico Gaio	1	2

Qualifying competition
4	(France) Kenny de Schepper	3	6^{1}
(Italy) Salvatore Caruso	6	7^{7}
