= Felipe Cunha e Silva =

Portuguese tennis player (born 1997)

- Country (sports): Portugal
- Residence: Lisbon, Portugal
- Born: 31 March 1997 (age 29) Cascais, Portugal
- Height: 1.80 m (5 ft 11 in)
- Plays: Right-handed (one-handed backhand)
- Coach: João Cunha e Silva
- Prize money: $15,884

Singles
- Career record: 0–0
- Career titles: 0
- Highest ranking: No. 1,062 (19 September 2016)

Grand Slam singles results
- French Open Junior: 2R (2015)
- Wimbledon Junior: 1R (2015)
- US Open Junior: 1R (2015)

Doubles
- Career record: 0–1
- Career titles: 0
- Highest ranking: No. 344 (1 May 2017)

Grand Slam doubles results
- French Open Junior: 2R (2015)
- Wimbledon Junior: 2R (2015)
- US Open Junior: 2R (2015)

Felipe Cunha e Silva (born 31 March 1997) is a Portuguese tennis player in the ITF Men's Circuit. In April 2016, he made his ATP World Tour debut in the doubles event of the 2016 Estoril Open. He reached a doubles career high ranking of world No. 371 in April 2017. He is a son of retired tennis player João Cunha e Silva.

== ITF men's doubles career record ==
Category Futures (6–3)	Surface Hard (3–1) Clay (4–2) Grass (0–0) Carpet (0–0)	Setting Outdoors (7–3) Indoors (0–0)

Outcome	Date	Category	Tournament	Surface	Partner	Opponents	Score
Winner	3 – 8 November 2015	Futures	El Kantaoui, Tunisia F30	Hard	(Portugal) João Domingues	(Spain) Samuel Ribeiro Navarrete (Spain) Bernabé Zapata Miralles	7–6^{(7–4)}, 6–1
Runner-up	17 – 22 May 2016	Futures	Setúbal, Portugal F6	Hard	(Portugal) Francisco Cabral	(Italy) Erik Crepaldi (Spain) Matthieu Roy	1–6, 3–6
Winner	26 – 31 July 2016	Futures	Castelo Branco, Portugal F10	Hard	(Portugal) Fred Gil	(United Kingdom) Scott Clayton (United Kingdom) Jonny O'Mara	1–6, 6–4, [12–10]
Winner	8 – 13 August 2016	Futures	Tangier, Morocco F6	Clay	(Italy) Julian Ocleppo	(France) Gianni Mina (France) Alexandre Müller	6–3, 6–3
Runner-up	18 – 23 October 2016	Futures	Hammamet, Tunisia F28	Clay	(Portugal) Fred Gil	(Spain) Sergio Martos Gornés (Spain) Oriol Roca Batalla	4–6, 4–6
Winner	25 – 30 October 2016	Futures	Hammamet, Tunisia F29	Clay	(Portugal) Fred Gil	(Netherlands) Alban Meuffels (Netherlands) Lennert Van der Linden	6–2, 7–5
Winner	1 – 6 November 2016	Futures	Hammamet, Tunisia F30	Clay	(Portugal) Fred Gil	(Lithuania) Lukas Mugevičius (Portugal) Gonçalo Oliveira	7–6^{(7–2)}, 7–6^{(7–5)}
Winner	7 – 12 February 2017	Futures	Hammamet, Tunisia F5	Clay	(Portugal) João Monteiro	(Italy) Giulio Di Meo (Colombia) Cristian Rodríguez	6–2, 7–6^{(7–4)}
Runner-up	14 – 18 February 2017	Futures	Hammamet, Tunisia F6	Clay	(Brazil) Wilson Leite	(Tunisia) Anis Ghorbel (Colombia) Cristian Rodríguez	1–6, 2–6
Winner	29 March – 1 April 2017	Futures	Lisbon, Portugal F4	Hard	(Portugal) João Monteiro	(Belgium) Yannick Mertens (Spain) David Vega Hernández	6–3, 7–5

== Career earnings ==
Year	Earnings	Ref
2016	$6,905	
2017	* $2,022	
Career *	$11,779	

* As of 10 April 2017.
