= Scott Lipsky =

American tennis player & coach (born 1981)

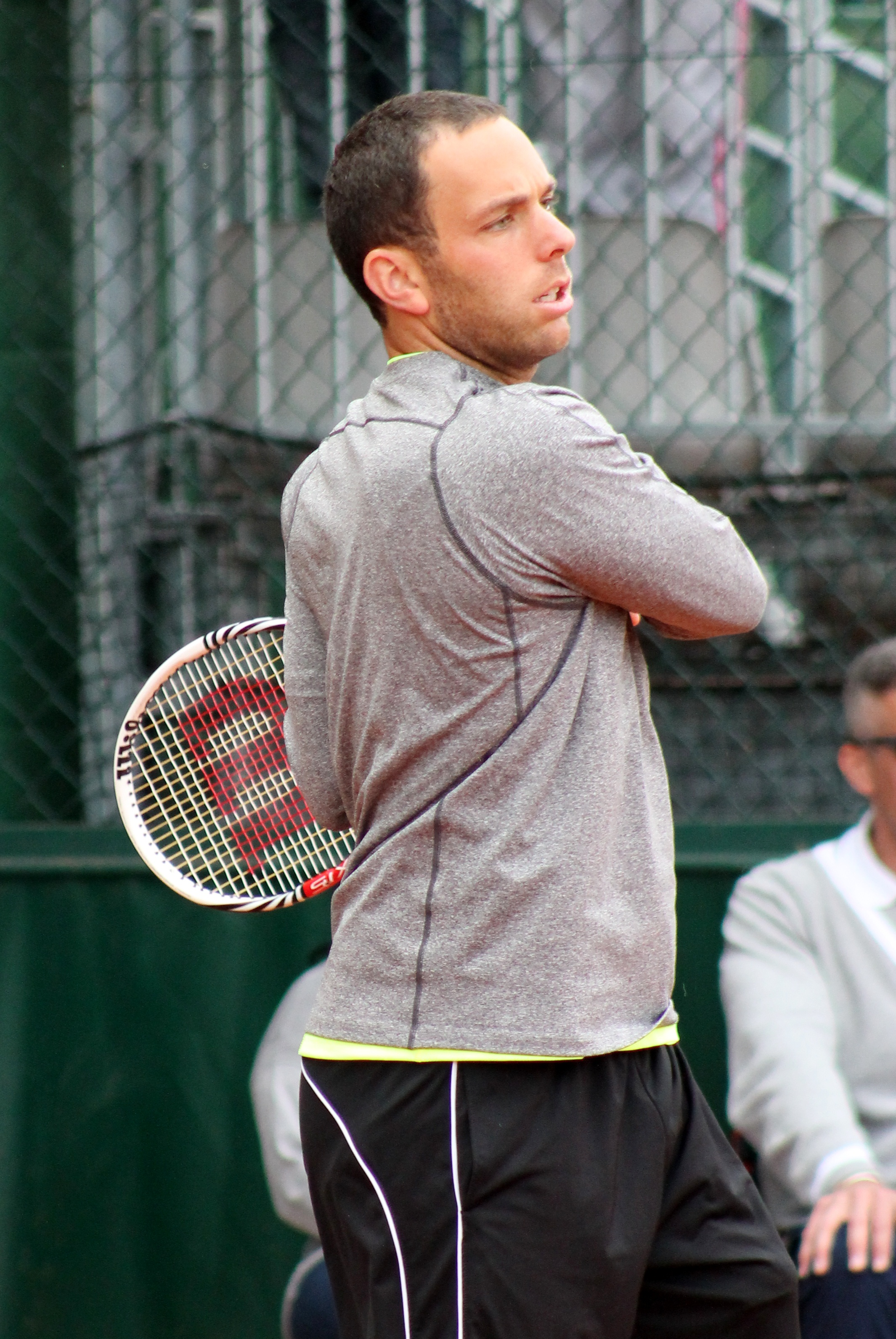
- Country (sports): United States
- Residence: Huntington Beach, California, U.S.
- Born: August 14, 1981 (age 45) Merrick, New York, U.S.
- Height: 1.85 m (6 ft 1 in)
- Turned pro: 2003
- Retired: 2018
- Plays: Right-handed
- College: Stanford
- Prize money: $1,695,242

Singles
- Career record: 0–1
- Career titles: 0
- Highest ranking: No. 315 (March 20, 2006)

Grand Slam singles results
- Australian Open: Q1 (2006)

Doubles
- Career record: 266–260
- Career titles: 16
- Highest ranking: No. 21 (June 17, 2013)

Grand Slam doubles results
- Australian Open: QF (2012)
- French Open: QF (2011)
- Wimbledon: QF (2012)
- US Open: SF (2014)

Mixed doubles
- Career titles: 1

Grand Slam mixed doubles results
- Australian Open: SF (2014)
- French Open: W (2011)
- Wimbledon: QF (2016)
- US Open: 2R (2010, 2012, 2016)
- Last updated on: July 2, 2018.

Scott Lipsky (born August 14, 1981 in Merrick, New York) is an American former professional tennis player and coach. As a player, Lipsky was primarily a doubles specialist.

As a junior, Lipsky was ranked No. 1 in the U.S. in singles in 1995, and No. 1 in doubles for three straight years, in 1995–97. He won USTA national singles championships at both the 1995 Boys' 14s Clay Court Championships and the 1997 Boys' 16s Clay Court Championships. In doubles, he and Jeremy Wurtzman won the USTA national 1996 and 1997 Boys' 16s Championships, and the 1999 Boys' 18s Clay Court Championships. After losing only one match in high school in New York, he was a three-time All-American for Stanford University, playing both singles and doubles. His Stanford team won the NCAA team championship in 2000, and he and teammate David Martin finished their college career ranked as the No. 2 doubles team in the nation. His current doubles partner is Treat Huey from the Philippines

Lipsky turned professional in 2003. He won his first Grand Slam title in 2011, winning the mixed doubles title at the French Open. He reached his career high world ranking in doubles, no. 21, in 2013.

Lipsky currently is the head coach of the tennis programs at St. Margaret's Episcopal School in San Juan Capistrano, California, a position he has held since July 2018.

== Personal and early life ==
Lipsky's mother, Gail, is a psychologist. His father, Marc, died suddenly in 2001 during his freshman year in college. His grandfather, Jack Sherry, was no. 2 in the world in table tennis. Lipsky is Jewish.

He began hitting tennis balls against a wall at home at age five. He received formal lessons at the Mid-Island Indoor Tennis Courts in Westbury, New York, and later at the Port Washington Tennis Academy. He also trained in Glen Cove, New York, at Robbie Wagner's Tournament Training Center. As a teenager, he played for a couple hours almost every day.

Lipsky attended Birch Elementary School in Merrick, New York, and Merrick Avenue Middle School. He went to high school at John F. Kennedy High School in Bellmore, New York, where his tennis coach was Alan Fleishman. He lost only one match in his high school tennis career for the Cougars. He graduated in 1999. He was a three-time New York State high school tennis champion and won a gold medal for the Long Island team at the Junior Maccabi Games. On the academic side, he was a member of the National Honor Society.

Lipsky married Marie in July 2010. He currently resides in Huntington Beach, California.

== Career ==
=== Juniors ===
Lipsky won the 1995 United States Tennis Association (USTA) Boys’ 14s Clay Court Championships in singles. At the age of 16, he was ranked # 1 in the U.S. in singles (defeating Andy Roddick for the 1995 U.S. Junior Open Championship). He was also ranked # 1 in singles in the 1997 USTA Boys’ 16s. He won the singles championship at the 1997 USTA National Boys’ 16s Clay Court Championships.

Lipsky was also ranked # 1 in doubles for three straight years, in 1995–97, among the more than 10,000 boys in the USTA's boy's division. He and Jeremy Wurtzman played doubles together and won three USTA National Clay Court Championships; the 1996 and 1997 USTA National Boys’ 16s Championships, and the 1999 USTA National Boys’ 18s Clay Court Championships.

=== College (1999–2003) ===
Lipsky attended Stanford University, graduating with a 3.0 GPA and a degree in American Studies. He won All-American honors three times between 1999 and 2003, was a member of the NCAA team champions in 2000, and reached the NCAA doubles finals in 2002 and semi-finals in 2001 and 2003. He first teamed up with David Martin in doubles in college. They finished their college career ranked as the # 2 team in the nation, and they extended their partnership into their pro careers.

He also occasionally played first singles at Stanford. In November 2001, Lipsky won the Northern California Regional Singles Championship.

=== 2003–06 ===
Lipsky and Martin won the doubles title at the Laguna Niguel, California Futures tournament in September 2003, as well as a Futures tournament in Mexico in October 2003.

In 2004, he won the first pro singles title of his career at the USTA Futures event in Yuba City, California, without dropping a set. In doubles, he and Martin won a number of doubles titles: the USTA Futures events in Costa Mesa, California (without dropping a set), Vero Beach, Florida (without dropping a set), and Key Biscayne, Florida (without dropping a set), the Japan F3 Futures event in Tokyo, Japan (without dropping a set), the Japan F1 Futures event in Kofu, Japan, and the Mexico F1 Futures in Chetumal, Mexico (without dropping a set), as well as a doubles titles in Harlingen, Texas (without dropping a set). He also won a doubles title with Lesley Joseph at the USTA Futures event in Auburn, California.

In 2005, he and Martin won doubles titles at USTA Futures events in Costa Mesa, California, McAllen, Texas, and Harlingen, Texas (without dropping a set). Lipsky also won doubles titles at the Togliatti Challenger in Russia (with Mark Nielsen; without dropping a set), the Little Rock, Arkansas Futures (with Tres Davis), the New Zealand F1 Futures in Hamilton, New Zealand (with Alexander Hartman), and the Great Britain F2 Futures event in Devon, Great Britain (with Brian Wilson; without dropping a set). In singles, he lost in the finals of the November Waikoloa, Hawaii, tournament to Wayne Odesnik.

In 2006, he played singles and doubles for the New York Buzz in World Team Tennis. In February, he lost in the finals of the New Zealand F1 tournament to Konstantinos Economidis of Greece. In doubles, in May he and Todd Widom won a tournament in Busan, Korea, in September he and Chris Drake won a tournament in Lubbock, Texas, and he and Martin won tournaments in Nashville, Tennessee, in Binghamton, New York, in Yuba City, California, and in Wollongong, New South Wales, Australia.

=== 2007–08 ===
Lipsky and Martin qualified for the main draw at the 2007 Wimbledon tournament, where they lost in the third round. They then made the final of a tournament in Los Angeles, California, which was Lipsky's first ATP final. He broke into the top 100 in the world in doubles for the first time, ranking # 92 in February 2007.

Lipsky and Martin captured their first ATP title in February 2008 indoor on hard courts at the SAP Open in San Jose. They defeated the number one ranked doubles team of Bob and Mike Bryan, 7–6 (4), 7–5, at HP Pavilion in a finals that matched former Stanford stars. They also won the Hilton Waikoloa Village USTA Challenger. Lipsky broke into the top 50 in the world in doubles for the first time, ranking # 46 in February 2008. In May 2008, they won the 2005 Costa Mesa Pro Futures Classic in Costa Mesa, California. In singles, in June 2008 Lipsky defeated world # 94 Jérémy Chardy of France 7–5, 4–6, 6–3, in Halle, Germany.

=== 2009–10 ===
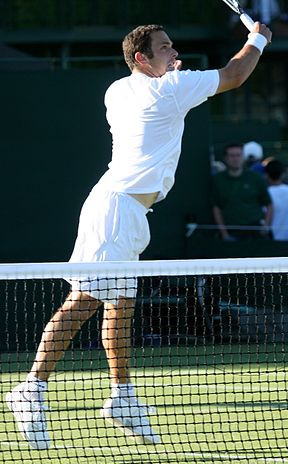
Lipsky at the 2009 Wimbledon Championships

In January 2009 he and Martin won a tournament in Carson, California. In April, May, and June 2009, Lipsky and American Eric Butorac won the Tallahassee Tennis Challenger, the Estoril Open in Portugal, and a tournament in Nottingham, Great Britain. Then, playing with Rik de Voest of South Africa, Lipsky won the Levene Gouldin & Thompson Tennis Challenger in Binghamton, New York.

In February 2010, he and Martin won a tournament in Dallas, and in October they won a tournament in Rennes, France.

In Atlanta in July 2010, he and American Rajeev Ram won their first doubles title together, defeating Rohan Bopanna and Kristof Vliegen for the outdoor hard court Atlanta Tennis Championships. The just-married Lipsky had arrived in Atlanta directly after his wedding, and said of his new wife: "She's pretty understanding. She wasn’t thrilled that I came out this week, but my ranking wasn’t as high as I needed it to be.... She allowed me to come." In the semifinals, Lipsky and Ram had defeated John Isner and James Blake, 7–6 (5), 7–6 (5). In November, they won a tournament in Eckental, Germany.

=== 2011; Grand Slam title ===
Lipsky started 2011 strong. He won a tournament in Singapore with Martin, and partnering with Rajeev Ram in February took the indoor hard court San Jose Open (over Christopher Kas from Germany and Alexander Peya from Austria) and the outdoor hard court Delray Beach titles (over Alejandro Falla from Colombia and Xavier Malisse from Belgium). In March, he and Ram won the Challenger of Dallas. He won a tournament in Athens, Greece, in April with Colin Fleming.

Lipsky then won his first ATP World Tour 500 title, teaming with Santiago González of Mexico in April. They won the outdoor clay Barcelona Open, defeating the world # 1 Bryan brothers in the finals as they broke their 10-match winning streak, 5–7, 6–2, 12–10. They also defeated top doubles teams Jürgen Melzer (# 8)/Nenad Zimonjić (# 4), 6–3, 6–2, and Max Mirnyi (# 6)/Daniel Nestor (# 3), 7–6 (4), 6–4.

He then played in the 2011 French Open in June 2011. Lipsky and his partner Casey Dellacqua of Australia caused a major upset in the mixed doubles, winning the championship and defeating defending champions Katarina Srebotnik and Nenad Zimonjić 7–6, 4–6, 10–7, despite being unseeded. It was Lipsky's first Grand Slam title. They shared $145,000 in prize money. Lipsky said: "You watch these matches on television, and you wish that someday you can be there. To be on this stage playing a Grand Slam final, and to come out with a win, and to say now for the rest of my life that I’m a Grand Slam champion, it's amazing." In men's doubles, he advanced to his first-ever grand slam quarterfinal appearance, with Rajeev Ram.

He reached his career-high ranking in doubles, # 26, on July 4, 2011.

== Grand Slam finals ==
=== Mixed Doubles: 1 (1–0) ===
Result	Year	Championship	Surface	Partner	Opponents	Score
Win	2011	French Open	Clay	(Australia) Casey Dellacqua	(Slovenia) Katarina Srebotnik (Serbia) Nenad Zimonjić	7–6^{(8–6)}, 4–6, [10–7]

== ATP career finals ==
=== Doubles: 28 (16 titles, 12 runner-ups) ===
Legend Grand Slam tournaments (0–0) ATP World Tour Finals (0–0) ATP World Tour Masters 1000 (0–0) ATP World Tour 500 Series (1–0) ATP World Tour 250 Series (15–12)	Titles by surface Hard (7–8) Clay (7–2) Grass (2–2)	Titles by setting Outdoor (12–11) Indoor (4–1)

Result	W–L	Date	Tournament	Tier	Surface	Partner	Opponents	Score
Loss	0–1	Jul 2007	Los Angeles Open, US	International	Hard	(United States) David Martin	(United States) Bob Bryan (United States) Mike Bryan	6–7^{(5–7)}, 2–6
Win	1–1	Feb 2008	Pacific Coast Championships, US	International	Hard (i)	(United States) David Martin	(United States) Bob Bryan (United States) Mike Bryan	7–6^{(7–4)}, 7–5
Loss	1–2	May 2008	Bavarian Championships, Germany	International	Clay	(United States) David Martin	(Germany) Michael Berrer (Germany) Rainer Schüttler	5–7, 6–3, [8–10]
Loss	1–3	Jul 2008	Indianapolis Tennis Championships, US	International	Hard	(United States) David Martin	(Australia) Ashley Fisher (United States) Tripp Phillips	6–3, 3–6, [5–10]
Loss	1–4	Sep 2008	Thailand Open, Thailand	International	Hard (i)	(United States) David Martin	(Czech Republic) Lukáš Dlouhý (India) Leander Paes	4–6, 6–7^{(4–7)}
Loss	1–5	Jan 2009	Auckland Open, New Zealand	250 Series	Hard	(India) Leander Paes	(Czech Republic) Martin Damm (Sweden) Robert Lindstedt	5–7, 4–6
Win	2–5	May 2009	Estoril Open, Portugal	250 Series	Clay	(United States) Eric Butorac	(Czech Republic) Martin Damm (Sweden) Robert Lindstedt	6–3, 6–2
Win	3–5	Jul 2010	Atlanta Open, US	250 Series	Hard	(United States) Rajeev Ram	(India) Rohan Bopanna (Belgium) Kristof Vliegen	6–3, 6–7^{(4–7)}, [12–10]
Loss	3–6	Feb 2011	SA Tennis Open, South Africa	250 Series	Hard	(United States) Rajeev Ram	(United States) James Cerretani (Canada) Adil Shamasdin	3–6, 6–3, [7–10]
Win	4–6	Feb 2011	Pacific Coast Championships, US (2)	250 Series	Hard (i)	(United States) Rajeev Ram	(Colombia) Alejandro Falla (Belgium) Xavier Malisse	6–4, 4–6, [10–8]
Win	5–6	Feb 2011	Delray Beach Open, US	250 Series	Hard	(United States) Rajeev Ram	(Germany) Christopher Kas (Austria) Alexander Peya	4–6, 6–4, [10–3]
Win	6–6	Apr 2011	Barcelona Open, Spain	500 Series	Clay	(Mexico) Santiago González	(United States) Bob Bryan (United States) Mike Bryan	5–7, 6–2, [12–10]
Loss	6–7	Jun 2012	Halle Open, Germany	250 Series	Grass	(Philippines) Treat Huey	(Pakistan) Aisam-ul-Haq Qureshi (Netherlands) Jean-Julien Rojer	3–6, 4–6
Win	7–7	Jul 2012	Hall of Fame Tennis Championships, US	250 Series	Grass	(Mexico) Santiago González	(United Kingdom) Colin Fleming (United Kingdom) Ross Hutchins	7–6^{(7–3)}, 6–3
Win	8–7	Aug 2012	Winston-Salem Open, US	250 Series	Hard	(Mexico) Santiago González	(Spain) Pablo Andújar (Argentina) Leonardo Mayer	6–3, 4–6, [10–2]
Win	9–7	May 2013	Portugal Open, Portugal (2)	250 Series	Clay	(Mexico) Santiago González	(Pakistan) Aisam-ul-Haq Qureshi (Netherlands) Jean-Julien Rojer	6–3, 4–6, [10–7]
Win	10–7	Jun 2013	Halle Open, Germany	250 Series	Grass	(Mexico) Santiago González	(Italy) Daniele Bracciali (Israel) Jonathan Erlich	6–2, 7–6^{(7–3)}
Win	11–7	May 2014	Portugal Open, Portugal (3)	250 Series	Clay	(Mexico) Santiago González	(Uruguay) Pablo Cuevas (Spain) David Marrero	6–3, 3–6, [10–8]
Win	12–7	May 2014	Düsseldorf Open, Germany	250 Series	Clay	(Mexico) Santiago González	(Germany) Martin Emmrich (Germany) Christopher Kas	7–5, 4–6, [10–3]
Loss	12–8	Jun 2014	Rosmalen Grass Court Championships, Netherlands	250 Series	Grass	(Mexico) Santiago González	(Netherlands) Jean-Julien Rojer (Romania) Horia Tecău	3–6, 6–7^{(3–7)}
Loss	12–9	Apr 2015	U.S. Men's Clay Court Championships, US	250 Series	Clay	(Philippines) Treat Huey	(Lithuania) Ričardas Berankis (Russia) Teymuraz Gabashvili	4–6, 4–6
Win	13–9	May 2015	Estoril Open, Portugal (4)	250 Series	Clay	(Philippines) Treat Huey	(Spain) Marc López (Spain) David Marrero	6–1, 6–4
Loss	13–10	Aug 2015	Winston-Salem Open, US	250 Series	Hard	(United States) Eric Butorac	(United Kingdom) Dominic Inglot (Sweden) Robert Lindstedt	2–6, 4–6
Win	14–10	Nov 2015	Valencia Open, Spain	250 Series	Hard (i)	(United States) Eric Butorac	(Spain) Feliciano López (Belarus) Max Mirnyi	7–6^{(7–4)}, 6–3
Loss	14–11	Jan 2016	Auckland Open, New Zealand	250 Series	Hard	(United States) Eric Butorac	(Croatia) Mate Pavić (New Zealand) Michael Venus	5–7, 4–6
Win	15–11	May 2016	Estoril Open, Portugal (5)	250 Series	Clay	(United States) Eric Butorac	(Poland) Łukasz Kubot (Poland) Marcin Matkowski	6–4, 3–6, [10–8]
Loss	15–12	Jan 2017	Auckland Open, New Zealand	250 Series	Hard	(Israel) Jonathan Erlich	(Poland) Marcin Matkowski (Pakistan) Aisam-ul-Haq Qureshi	6–1, 2–6, [3–10]
Win	16–12	Oct 2017	European Open, Belgium	250 Series	Hard (i)	(India) Divij Sharan	(Mexico) Santiago González (Chile) Julio Peralta	6–4, 2–6, [10–5]

== Doubles performance timeline ==
Key
W	F	SF	QF	#R	RR	Q#	P#	DNQ	A	Z#	PO	G	S	B	NMS	NTI	P	NH

(W) winner; (F) finalist; (SF) semifinalist; (QF) quarterfinalist; (#R) rounds 4, 3, 2, 1; (RR) round-robin stage; (Q#) qualification round; (P#) preliminary round; (DNQ) did not qualify; (A) absent; (Z#) Davis/Fed Cup Zonal Group (with number indication) or (PO) play-off; (G) gold, (S) silver or (B) bronze Olympic/Paralympic medal; (NMS) not a Masters tournament; (NTI) not a Tier I tournament; (P) postponed; (NH) not held; (SR) strike rate (events won / competed); (W–L) win–loss record.

Current till 2017 Wimbledon Championships.

Tournament	2000	2001	2002	2003	2004	2005	2006	2007	2008	2009	2010	2011	2012	2013	2014	2015	2016	2017	SR	W–L
Grand Slam tournaments
Australian Open	A	A	A	A	A	A	A	A	2R	1R	2R	1R	QF	1R	1R	1R	2R	1R	0 / 10	6–10
French Open	A	A	A	A	A	A	A	1R	2R	1R	2R	QF	3R	1R	2R	1R	3R	2R	0 / 11	11–11
Wimbledon	A	A	A	A	A	A	A	3R	1R	2R	1R	2R	QF	2R	2R	2R	2R	1R	0 / 11	11–11
US Open	A	A	A	A	A	A	A	1R	1R	1R	1R	1R	3R	1R	SF	3R	1R	1R	0 / 11	8–11
Win–loss	0–0	0–0	0–0	0–0	0–0	0–0	0–0	2–3	2–4	1–4	2–4	4–4	10–4	1–4	6–4	3–4	4–4	1–4	0 / 43	36–43
ATP World Tour Masters 1000
Indian Wells Masters	A	A	A	A	A	A	A	A	A	A	A	A	1R	SF	1R	A	A	A	0 / 3	3–3
Miami Open	A	A	A	A	A	A	A	A	A	A	A	A	2R	A	1R	1R	1R	A	0 / 4	1–4
Madrid Open	Not Held		A	A	A	A	A	A	A	A	A	A	A	A	A	1R	A	A	0 / 1	0–1
Italian Open	A	A	A	A	A	A	A	A	A	A	A	A	A	SF	1R	A	A	A	0 / 2	3–2
Canadian Open	A	A	A	A	A	A	A	A	A	A	A	A	2R	A	A	A	A	A	0 / 1	1–1
Cincinnati Masters	A	A	A	A	A	A	A	A	1R	A	A	2R	A	SF	A	1R	A	A	0 / 4	4–4
Shanghai Masters	Not Held									A	A	1R	1R	1R	2R	A	A	A	0 / 4	1–4
Paris Masters	A	A	A	A	A	A	A	A	A	A	A	A	2R	QF	A	A	A	A	0 / 2	3–2
Win–loss	0–0	0–0	0–0	0–0	0–0	0–0	0–0	0–0	0–1	0–0	0–0	1–2	3–5	11–5	1–4	0–3	0–1	0–0	0 / 21	16–21
Career statistics
Titles / Finals	0 / 0	0 / 0	0 / 0	0 / 0	0 / 0	0 / 0	0 / 0	0 / 1	1 / 4	1 / 2	1 / 1	3 / 4	2 / 3	2 / 2	2 / 3	2 / 4	1 / 2	1 / 2	16 / 28	
Overall win–loss	0–1	0–0	0–0	0–0	0–0	0–0	0–0	14–17	22–22	18–22	15–18	29–25	35–27	29–26	24–26	32–25	24–23	18–20	260–252	
Year-end ranking	1232	1164	1458	415	225	154	101	63	57	51	59	29	25	31	32	40	48	69	51%	

== See also ==
- List of select Jewish tennis players
