= Estoril Open (tennis) =

Tennis tournament in Portugal

Coordinates: 38°42′29″N 9°15′9″W

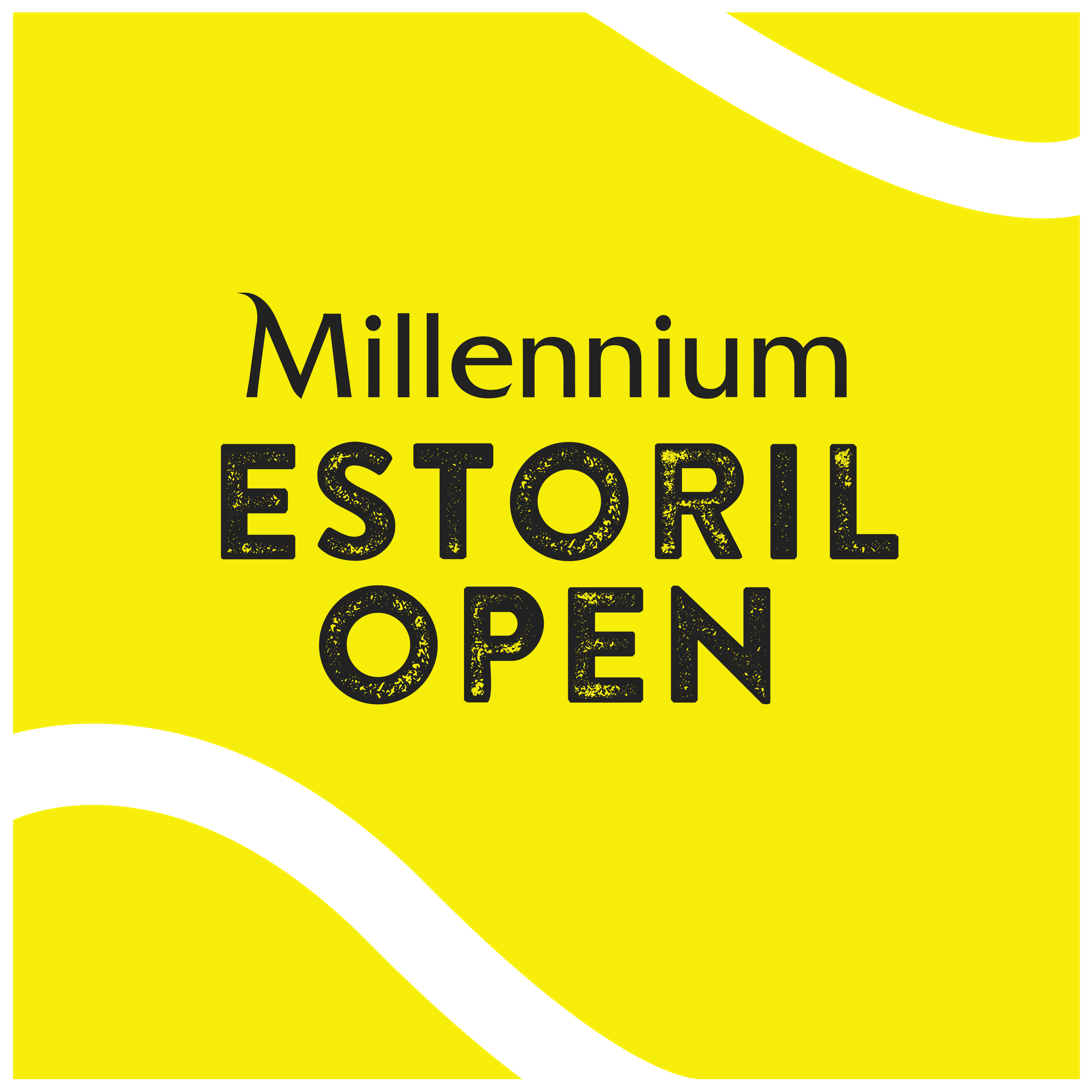

ATP Challenger Tour
- Founded: 2015
- Editions: 9
- Location: Cascais; Portugal
- Venue: Clube de Ténis do Estoril
- Category: ATP Tour 250 (2015–2024, 2026–2027); ATP Challenger Tour 175 (2025)
- Surface: Clay / outdoor
- Draw: 28S / 16Q / 16D
- Prize money: €227,270 (2025), €579,320 (2024, 2026-)
- Website: millenniumestorilopen.com

Current champions (2026)
- Singles: (France) Luca Van Assche
- Doubles: (France) Titouan Droguet; (France) Kyrian Jacquet

The Estoril Open (also known as the Millennium Estoril Open for sponsorship purposes) is an ATP 250 clay court tennis tournament held in the Portuguese Riviera. The event takes place at the sports complex of Clube de Ténis do Estoril in Cascais.

== History ==
The tournament was removed from the 2025 ATP calendar, and its future was left uncertain, until it was announced in September 2024 that it would be returning in 2025 as an ATP Challenger 175, and an ATP 250 event in 2026 and 2027.

Estoril Open was created by former Dutch tennis player Benno van Veggel and Portuguese football agent Jorge Mendes in 2015 to replace the Portugal Open, which was canceled due to lack of sponsorships.

== Results ==
=== Singles ===
Year	Champion	Runner-up	Score
2015	(France) Richard Gasquet	(Australia) Nick Kyrgios	6–3, 6–2
2016	(Spain) Nicolás Almagro	(Spain) Pablo Carreño Busta	6–7^{(6–8)}, 7–6^{(7–5)}, 6–3
2017	(Spain) Pablo Carreño Busta	(Luxembourg) Gilles Müller	6–2, 7–6^{(7–5)}
2018	(Portugal) João Sousa	(United States) Frances Tiafoe	6–4, 6–4
2019	(Greece) Stefanos Tsitsipas	(Uruguay) Pablo Cuevas	6–3, 7–6^{(7–4)}
2020	Not held due to the COVID-19 pandemic.		
2021	(Spain) Albert Ramos Viñolas	(United Kingdom) Cameron Norrie	4–6, 6–3, 7–6^{(7–3)}
2022	(Argentina) Sebastián Báez	(United States) Frances Tiafoe	6–3, 6–2
2023	(Norway) Casper Ruud	(Serbia) Miomir Kecmanović	6–2, 7–6^{(7–3)}
2024	(Poland) Hubert Hurkacz	(Spain) Pedro Martínez	6–3, 6–4
↓ ATP Challenger 175 ↓
2025	(United States) Alex Michelsen	(Italy) Andrea Pellegrino	6–4, 6–4
↓ ATP 250 ↓
2026	(France) Luca Van Assche	(Belgium) Alexander Blockx	6–4, 4–6, 7–5

=== Doubles ===
Year	Champions	Runners-up	Score
2015	(Philippines) Treat Huey (United States) Scott Lipsky	(Spain) Marc López (Spain) David Marrero	6–1, 6–4
2016	(United States) Eric Butorac (United States) Scott Lipsky	(Poland) Łukasz Kubot (Poland) Marcin Matkowski	6–4, 3–6, [10–8]
2017	(United States) Ryan Harrison (New Zealand) Michael Venus	(Spain) David Marrero (Spain) Tommy Robredo	7–5, 6–2
2018	(United Kingdom) Kyle Edmund (United Kingdom) Cameron Norrie	(Netherlands) Wesley Koolhof (New Zealand) Artem Sitak	6–4, 6–2
2019	(France) Jérémy Chardy (France) Fabrice Martin	(United Kingdom) Luke Bambridge (United Kingdom) Jonny O'Mara	7–5, 7–6^{(7–3)}
2020	Not held due to the COVID-19 pandemic.		
2021	(Monaco) Hugo Nys (Germany) Tim Pütz	(United Kingdom) Luke Bambridge (United Kingdom) Dominic Inglot	7–5, 3–6, [10–3]
2022	(Portugal) Nuno Borges (Portugal) Francisco Cabral	(Argentina) Máximo González (Sweden) André Göransson	6–2, 6–3
2023	(Belgium) Sander Gillé (Belgium) Joran Vliegen	(Serbia) Nikola Ćaćić (Serbia) Miomir Kecmanović	6–3, 6–4
2024	(Ecuador) Gonzalo Escobar (Kazakhstan) Aleksandr Nedovyesov	(France) Sadio Doumbia (France) Fabien Reboul	7–5, 6–2
↓ ATP Challenger 125 ↓
2025	(Uruguay) Ariel Behar (Belgium) Joran Vliegen	(Portugal) Francisco Cabral (Austria) Lucas Miedler	7–5, 6–3
↓ ATP 250 ↓
2026	(France) Titouan Droguet (France) Kyrian Jacquet	(Brazil) Orlando Luz (Brazil) Rafael Matos	7–6^{(7–2)}, 6–7^{(4–7)}, [11–9]

== See also ==
- Portugal Open (1990–2014)
