= João Sousa =

Portuguese tennis player (born 1989)

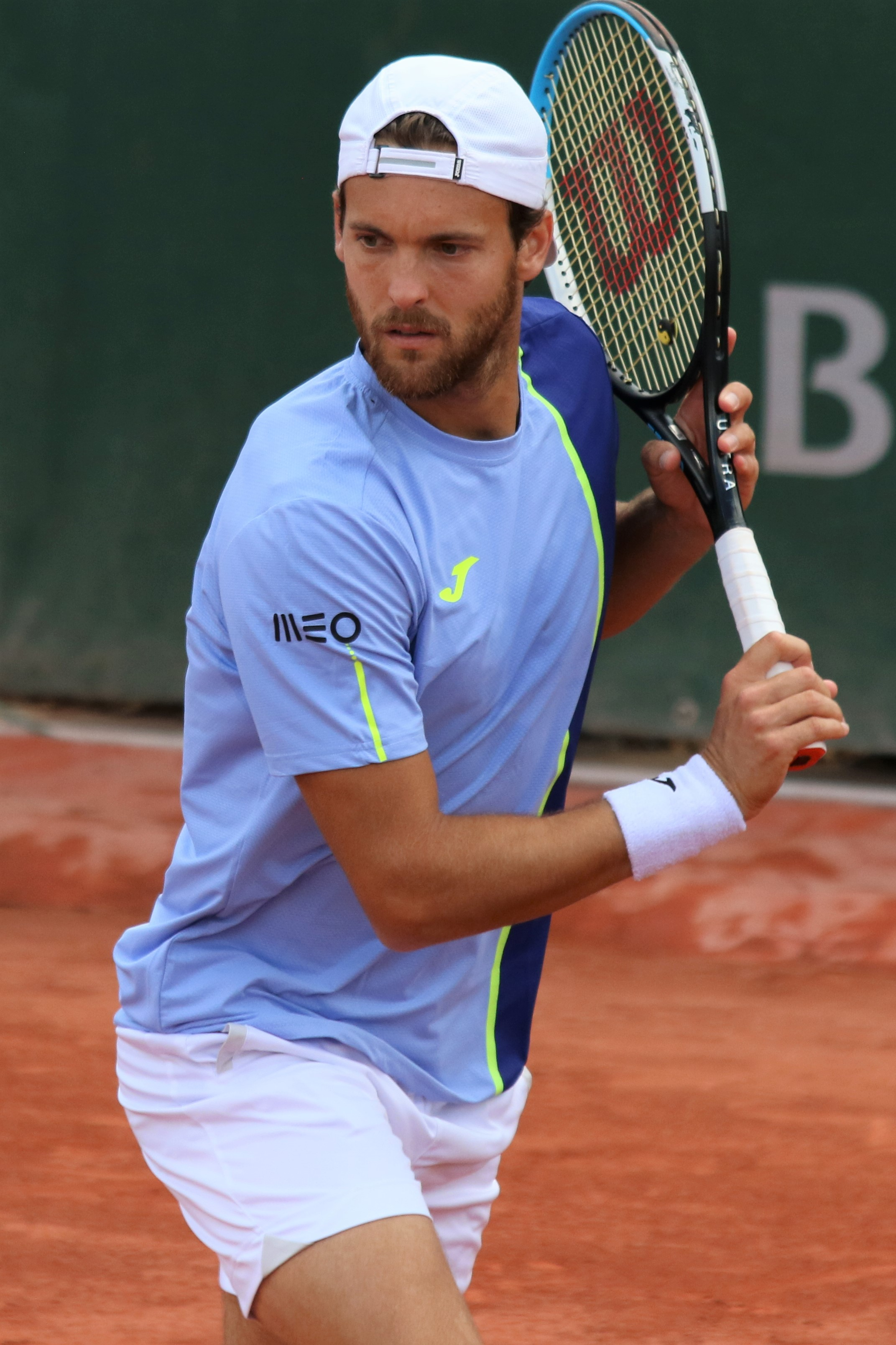
- Sousa at the 2022 French Open
- Full name: João Pedro Coelho Marinho de Sousa
- Country (sports): Portugal
- Residence: Barcelona, Spain
- Born: 30 March 1989 (age 37) Guimarães, Portugal
- Height: 1.85 m (6 ft 1 in)
- Turned pro: 2008
- Retired: 2024
- Plays: Right-handed (two-handed backhand)
- Coach: Frederico Marques
- Prize money: US$8,329,175

Singles
- Career record: 220–269
- Career titles: 4
- Highest ranking: No. 28 (16 May 2016)

Grand Slam singles results
- Australian Open: 3R (2015, 2016, 2019)
- French Open: 2R (2013, 2015, 2016, 2017, 2022)
- Wimbledon: 4R (2019)
- US Open: 4R (2018)

Other tournaments
- Olympic Games: 2R (2016)

Doubles
- Career record: 101–141
- Career titles: 0
- Highest ranking: No. 26 (13 May 2019)

Grand Slam doubles results
- Australian Open: SF (2019)
- French Open: 3R (2014, 2018)
- Wimbledon: 3R (2018)
- US Open: QF (2015, 2019, 2022)

Other doubles tournaments
- Olympic Games: 2R (2016)

Team competitions
- Davis Cup: 38–26
- Last updated on: 20 January 2024.

João Pedro Coelho Marinho de Sousa (born 30 March 1989), known as João Sousa (Portuguese pronunciation: [ʒuˈɐ̃w ˈso(u)zɐ, ˈʒwɐ̃w -]), is a Portuguese former professional tennis player. He achieved a career-high ATP singles ranking of No. 28 on 16 May 2016, making him the highest-ranked Portuguese player in history. He has a best doubles ranking of No. 26 achieved in May 2019.

He is nicknamed Conquistador (Portuguese for "Conqueror") for sharing his birthplace of Guimarães with Afonso I, the country's first king. Continuously ranked in the world's top-100 between July 2013 and March 2021, and with four ATP Tour singles titles, Sousa is often regarded as the best Portuguese tennis player of all time. (Note: See)

Sousa began playing tennis at the age of seven. After winning national youth titles, he decided at the age of fifteen to invest in his career by moving to Barcelona. After an unimpressive junior career, Sousa turned professional in 2008 and won his first singles tournament in 2009. He started playing in the ATP Challenger Tour in 2008, winning his first tournament at this level in 2011. Sousa debuted in the top-level ATP World Tour in 2008, and rose to prominence at the 2013 Malaysian Open, where he became the first Portuguese player to win a World Tour-level singles tournament. Sousa holds several Portuguese men's tennis records. In October 2013, he ranked 49th in the world after his victory at the Malaysian Open, becoming the first Portuguese player to break into the singles top 50. In November 2015, Sousa reached a career-high and Portuguese-best ranking of World No. 33, following his second ATP World Tour singles title at the Valencia Open. In May 2016, he improved his personal ranking best, becoming the first Portuguese player to enter the top 30 at World No. 28, as a result of reaching his first Masters 1000 quarterfinal in Madrid. In 2014, he was the first Portuguese player to compete exclusively at the ATP World Tour in a single season; the first to be seeded in a Grand Slam tournament (2014 US Open); and the second to reach the quarterfinals in a Grand Slam event (2015 US Open doubles). Sousa is the fourth Portuguese player to reach the singles top 100, and the second to do so in both singles and doubles rankings, after Nuno Marques. He is also the Portuguese player with the largest career prize money, and the most wins at Grand Slam singles tournaments.

== Early and personal life ==
João Sousa was born on 30 March 1989 in Guimarães, Portugal, to Armando Marinho de Sousa, a judge and amateur tennis player, and Adelaide Coelho Sousa, a bank clerk. Sousa has a younger brother named Luís Carlos. At age seven, Sousa began playing tennis with his father at a local club. In 2001, he won the national under-12 singles title, beating future Davis Cup partner Gastão Elias in the semifinals, and was runner-up in doubles. In 2003, he partnered with Elias to win the national under-14 doubles title. Sousa also played football at local clubs Vitória de Guimarães – of which he is a keen supporter – and Os Sandinenses until the age of 14, when he decided to give up on football and the goal of studying medicine to pursue a professional tennis career. He briefly joined the National Tennis Training Center in Maia until he was forced to leave after its closure.

In September 2004, aged 15, Sousa moved to Barcelona, Spain, to attend a boarding school and join the Catalan Tennis Federation. A year later, he joined the BTT Tennis Academy, which was recommended to him by former member and countryman Rui Machado. He was first coached by Álvaro Margets, under the supervision of one of his mentors, Francisco Roig. At the academy, he met and shared a flat with his future coach, Frederico Marques. Sousa continues to practice at BTT, even after joining the ATP Tour.

During his youth, Sousa's idols were Pete Sampras, Juan Carlos Ferrero, and Roger Federer. He is fluent in Portuguese, Spanish, Catalan, as well as English, French and Italian. Since 2008, Sousa has been dating Júlia Villanueva, whom he met during his training in Barcelona.

Sousa and his family manage the Conquistador Palace hotel in his hometown of Guimarães. The hotel opened on November 13, 2021.

== Tennis career ==
=== Pre-2008: Junior years ===
Sousa made his debut in a junior tournament in August 2004 at the Grade 4 Taça Diogo Nápoles in Porto, reaching the semifinals. His first junior doubles title came in April 2005 at a Grade 4 tournament in Guadeloupe, where he also reached his first junior singles final. Though he never won a singles title on the junior circuit, Sousa reached three singles finals and won five doubles titles, including a Grade 2 tournament in France. In 2005 Sousa was runner-up at the Portugal under-16 National Championship, losing in the final to Gastão Elias. He had previously won the doubles title at the 2004 edition in the same age category.

Sousa peaked at number 61 in the world junior rankings in early 2007, shortly after entering the main draw of the 2006 Orange Bowl. His only participation at a junior Grand Slam was short-lived; he lost in the first qualifying round of the 2007 French Open Boys' Singles tournament. Sousa's last junior tournament was the European Junior Championships in Austria in July 2007.

Despite not having turned professional before 2008, Sousa made his debut at a senior tournament in October 2005 after entering as a wild card in the main draw of a Futures doubles tournament in Barcelona. His first win as a senior came at a Futures doubles tournament, in August 2006 in Oviedo, and his debut singles tournament participation and win both came in May 2007 at a Futures tournament in Lleida, Spain. Sousa would not go beyond quarterfinals at any Futures event until 2008.

=== 2008–2012: Early career ===
In 2008, Sousa began the season by winning his first professional title at the final of a Futures doubles tournament in Murcia. He reached two more doubles finals that year, winning a second title in August in Bakio. The biggest achievement in his 2008 campaign came at the Estoril Open. Entering through qualifying rounds, Sousa made his debut at the main draw of an ATP Tour-level tournament. He had his first ATP win over Austrian Oliver Marach, losing to Frederico Gil in the second round. Sousa also started playing at the ATP Challenger Tour and for the Portugal Davis Cup team in 2008. He played two singles dead rubbers, winning over Cyprus' Eleftherios Christou in July and losing to Ukraine's Illya Marchenko in September.

Besides winning two more Futures doubles titles in three finals in Irun and Espinho, Sousa reached his first four singles finals at the same level in 2009. He won the title in the La Palma final. At the Estoril Open, Sousa was granted a wild card to participate in his first doubles ATP World Tour level tournament, but lost in the first round. During 2009, Sousa was twice called to the Portugal Davis Cup team, winning both singles dead rubbers he took part in – over Philippos Tsangaridis from Cyprus in March and Algeria's Sid-Ali Akkal in July. In 2010, Sousa won his first Challenger title at the Tampere's doubles tournament in August. In the 2010 season, Sousa did not enter any ATP tournament; he began shifting his schedule increasingly from the Futures circuit to the Challenger tour. He was more successful in the Futures, winning three singles titles in four finals at Valldoreix, Tenerife and Lanzarote, and doubles titles in Lanzarote, Córdoba and two in Tenerife. At the Davis Cup, Sousa played two more dead rubbers, winning for the second time in three seasons over Cyprus' Christou and losing to Bosnian Damir Džumhur.

Sousa reached several milestones in 2011. At the Challenger Tour, he won his first singles title at that level in Fürth in June. At the ATP World Tour, Sousa participated as a wildcard in the singles and doubles events in Estoril, losing in the second round of the former to Canadian Milos Raonic. He also made his first attempt at entering the main draw of a Grand Slam tournament, but fell in the qualifying rounds at the Australian Open, Wimbledon and the US Open. In October, Sousa's participation at the Sabadell Futures was his last presence in the main draw of a tournament in that category. He won three more singles and one doubles Futures titles, making his career titles at this level seven singles and nine doubles titles. Once again, Sousa was called for two dead rubbers at Davis Cup, winning over Martin Kližan from Slovakia and losing to Switzerland's Marco Chiudinelli. In October 2011, he hired Frederico Marques as a coach when he was ranked world No. 220.

At the 2012 Estoril Open, Sousa reached the quarterfinals of an ATP tour tournament for the first time, losing to Albert Ramos. At the 2012 French Open, he made his debut as a qualifier in the main draw of a Grand Slam tournament. He would lose in the first round to 20th seed Marcel Granollers in four sets. He did not progress past the qualifying rounds at the other three Grand Slam tournaments. He also entered main draw events at the Barcelona Open (lost to Frederico Gil in the 2nd round) and the Croatia Open (lost to Matthias Bachinger in the 1st round). At Challenger tournaments, Sousa won two singles titles out of three finals – Mersin and Tampere – and one doubles title at Fürth.

His role at the 2012 Davis Cup rose in importance. Sousa played his first doubles rubber against Israel, partnering with Gastão Elias in a loss against Andy Ram and Jonathan Erlich. Ram also beat Sousa in a dead rubber – his last as of 2016. In September, Sousa played three rubbers against Slovakia. He won the first singles match over Lukáš Lacko but lost the doubles with Elias and his second singles match to Martin Kližan, meaning Portugal's relegation from Europe/Africa Zone Group I to Group II in 2013. In this same month, Sousa became the top-ranked Portuguese tennis player for the first time, at No. 107. In October, his world ranking rose to No. 99, and Sousa became the fourth Portuguese player to enter the ATP top-100 singles ranking after Nuno Marques, Frederico Gil and Rui Machado.

=== 2013: Breakthrough in the ATP ===
Sousa started the 2013 season with his first participation in ATP tour level hardcourt tournaments at the Chennai Open and the Sydney International. Despite being knocked out of both tournaments in the first round, he returned to the top-100 world rankings. At the Australian Open, Sousa won his first Grand Slam on his second attempt, following a first-round win over wildcard John-Patrick Smith. He lost to world number three Andy Murray in straight sets in the second round. In February, Sousa participated in the Portugal Davis Cup team in their Europe/Africa Zone Group II tie against Benin. He won his singles match against Loic Didavi and the doubles match partnering with Pedro Sousa. Portugal won the tie 5–0 and progressed to the second round. Sousa then played his first clay court tournaments of the season at the Chile Open and ATP Buenos Aires, where he again lost in the first round. At the Mexican Open, he defeated former top 10 Jürgen Melzer in the first round, but lost in the second round to Santiago Giraldo.

Despite failing to qualify for the Indian Wells Masters, Sousa entered for the first time in his career in the main draw of a Masters event at the Miami Masters. He lost in the first round to former world number 1 Lleyton Hewitt in straight sets. Sousa did not play in April after fracturing his left foot during a Davis Cup training session. He was scheduled to return as a wild card at the Portugal Open. His invitation was given to world number 4 David Ferrer instead, which stirred some controversy in Portuguese media. Later in the season, Sousa showed uncertainties about his future Portugal Open participation, which prompted tournament director João Lagos to comment on the contention. Ahead of the 2014 edition, the controversy was no longer an issue.

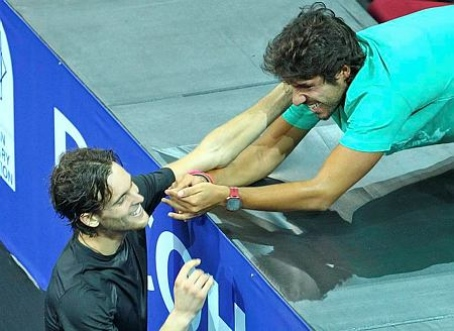
João Sousa and his coach Frederico Marques celebrate the 2013 Malaysian Open title.

Sousa returned to action at the Madrid Masters qualifying rounds and at his first Challenger tournament of the season in Bordeaux, but he lost early in these attempts. At the 2013 French Open, Sousa won his first round match over Go Soeda in straight sets, and lost in the second round to Spaniard Feliciano López. He returned to the Challenger circuit with a singles title at Fürth and an early loss at Košice. It was also his second title in Fürth, after the triumph in 2011. Sousa missed the 2013 Wimbledon Championships main draw after losing in the third qualifying round to Julian Reister. He would also lose in the qualifying rounds of the doubles competition, while partnering with Teymuraz Gabashvili. In July, he played exclusively in Challenger tournaments, being runner-up in singles and doubles in San Benedetto, re-entering the top 100 rankings, which he has maintained ever since. He won the singles title in his hometown Guimarães. This remains his last participation at the ATP Challenger Tour, having won five singles and two doubles titles at the level. After losing in the qualifying rounds of the Cincinnati Masters, Sousa returned to the ATP World Tour at the Winston-Salem Open in August, losing to Alex Bogomolov Jr. in the second round. In his first US Open appearance, Sousa reached the third round after defeating 25th seed Grigor Dimitrov and Jarkko Nieminen in back-to-back 5-set matches. He ended his campaign losing to world No. 1 Novak Djokovic. This was his best result at Grand Slams yet.

In September, Sousa joined Portugal's Davis Cup team to face Moldova in the semifinals of Europe/Africa Zone Group II. He won his first singles match over Maxim Dubarenco and the doubles match with Gastão Elias. He lost his second singles match to Radu Albot in an epic five-set duel which lasted nearly five hours. Portugal won 3–2 and was promoted to Group I in 2014. Following early-round wins over Paolo Lorenzi and Sergiy Stakhovsky at the St. Petersburg Open, Sousa beat former ATP top 20 player Dmitry Tursunov in the quarterfinals to advance to his first career ATP tour semifinal. He would lose there to Guillermo García López.

Sousa's breakthrough title came at the Malaysian Open, in the early rounds of which he defeated Ryan Harrison and Pablo Cuevas. In the quarterfinals, Sousa defeated world No. 4 David Ferrer in straight set; Sousa's first career win over a top-10 player. Then, he qualified to his first ATP tour level final after getting past Jürgen Melzer in three sets. Sousa beat Frenchman Julien Benneteau in three sets in the final after saving one match point, becoming the first Portuguese player to win an ATP World Tour singles tournament. He also became the highest ranked Portuguese ever, climbing from No. 77 to No. 51. The previous record holder was Rui Machado, who was world No. 59 in 2011. Sousa officially entered the top 50 for the first time on 7 October 2013.

In October, Sousa had a first-round loss at the Kremlin Cup and a second round appearance at the Valencia Open. After beating Guillermo García López in the first round, Sousa lost to 2013 Wimbledon semifinalist Jerzy Janowicz. Sousa finished his 2013 season by being eliminated from the Paris Masters in the qualifying round. At world No. 49, he became the first Portuguese to finish the season in the top 50. In November, Sousa was nominated for the 2013 Portuguese Sportsman of the Year award, losing to cyclist Rui Costa. At the same ceremony, he was named Tennis Personality of the Year by the Portuguese Tennis Federation.

=== 2014: Consolidating presence in the ATP World Tour ===
Sousa began the 2014 season with a first-round loss at the 2014 Qatar Open. At the Sydney International's doubles competition, he partnered with Lukáš Rosol to defeat the Bryan brothers, the then-world No. 1 doubles team, en route to the semifinals. At the 2014 Australian Open, he was beaten by world No. 137 and future Grand Slam champion Dominic Thiem in the first round. Partnering with Colombian Santiago Giraldo, Sousa was eliminated in the first round of the doubles competition by Mahesh Bhupathi and Rajeev Ram. Later in January, Sousa joined the Portugal Davis Cup team to face Slovenia for the Europe/Africa Group I 1st Round. He won his first singles match against Janez Semrajc, but then lost in the doubles match and his second singles match against Blaž Kavčič. Portugal eventually lost 3–2 and fell to a relegation playoff. In February, he started with early round losses at the Open Sud de France and ATP Buenos Aires. Sousa played at the Rio Open and reached the quarterfinals, where he was beaten by world No. 1 Rafael Nadal. Sousa ended February with a second-round defeat and exit to Andy Murray at the Mexican Open. During the North American hard court Masters swing in March, Sousa started the Indian Wells Masters with a win over Aleksandr Nedovyesov, followed with a second-round loss to 20th seed Ernests Gulbis. At the 2014 Sony Open Tennis in Miami, Florida, Sousa reached the third round. After beating 26th seed Gilles Simon in the second round, he lost to world No. 7 Tomáš Berdych.

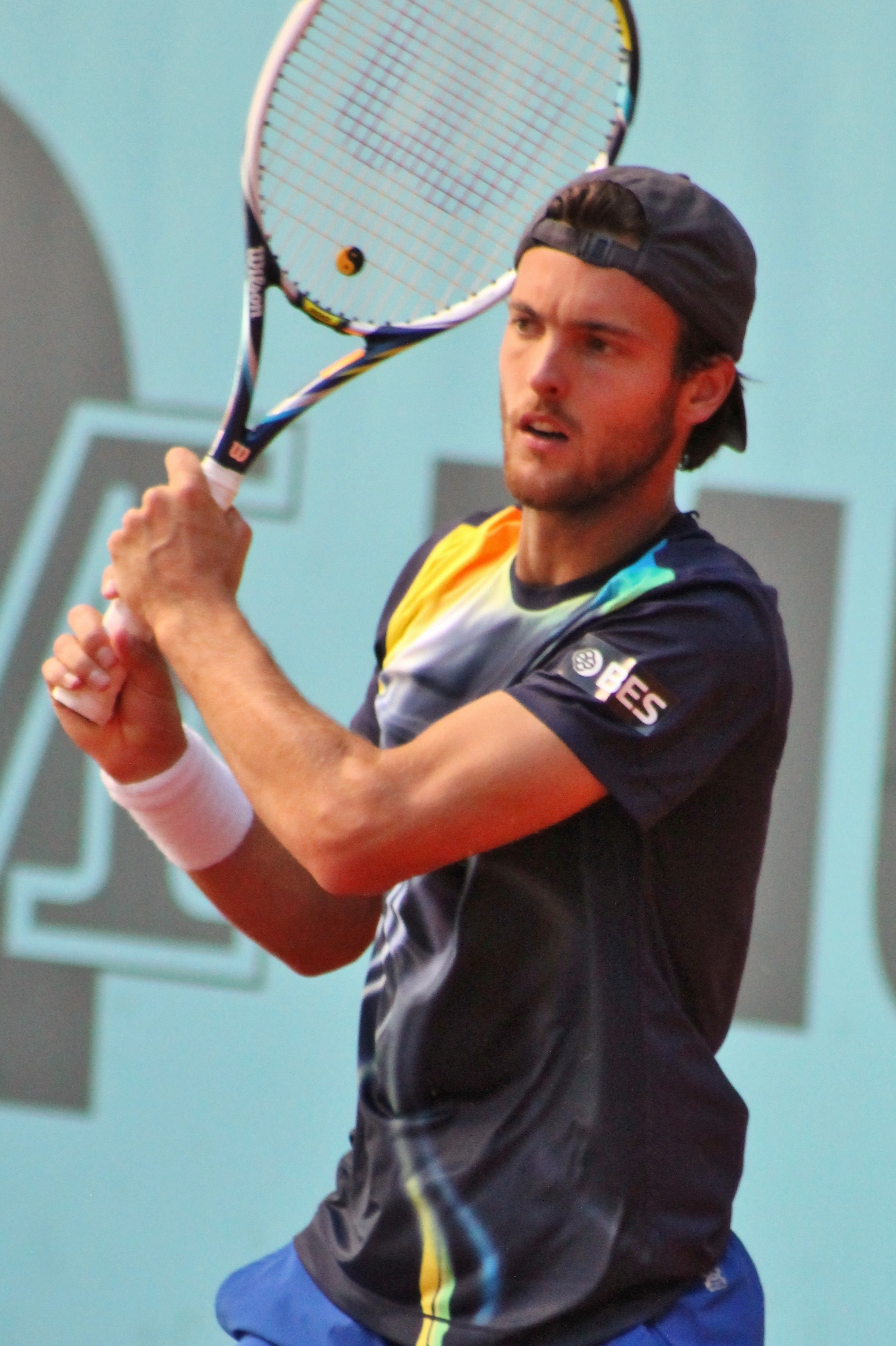
Sousa during 2014 spring clay court season

Sousa began the spring clay court season at the Grand Prix Hassan II in Casablanca, where he was beaten by world No. 273 Roberto Carballés Baena in a second-round match lasting over three hours. This loss started an eight-match losing streak that lasted the remainder of the clay court season – it included losses at the Monte-Carlo Masters, at the Barcelona Open, at the Portugal Open, at the Madrid Masters, at the Rome Masters, and at the Düsseldorf Open. In the first round of the 2014 French Open, Sousa suffer his eighth consecutive loss against world No. 2 Novak Djokovic. During this run of losses, Sousa reached the semifinals of the Portugal Open's doubles competition and the third round at the 2014 French Open doubles competition, where he partnered with American Jack Sock and lost to Andrey Golubev and Sam Groth.

Sousa made his debut at an ATP grass tournament main draw at the Halle Open. In the first round, he beat German wild card Jan-Lennard Struff and snapped the eight match losing streak. Then, he faced former world No. 1 and 6-time Halle champion Roger Federer in the second round. After winning a close first set, Sousa ended up losing in three sets to the Swiss. At the Rosmalen Grass Court Championships, Sousa became the first Portuguese player ever to reach the semifinal of an ATP tour level grass tournament. He beat in succession Paolo Lorenzi, Mate Pavić and Thiemo de Bakker, losing in the semifinals to Benjamin Becker. To cap his grass court season, Sousa played his first ever Wimbledon Championships main draw match at the 2014 edition, with a straight sets loss in the first round to world No. 3 Stan Wawrinka. In the doubles competition, he partnered with Argentinian Carlos Berlocq to play a four-hour, five-set first round loss to Martin Kližan and Dominic Thiem.

In July, Sousa reached his second-career ATP tour level final and his first of 2014 at the Swedish Open, defeating the defending champion Carlos Berlocq in the semifinals. He lost the final to the Uruguayan Pablo Cuevas in straight sets. After losing in early rounds at the German Open and the Croatia Open, Sousa entered the Canada Masters, where he was defeated in the first round by 11th seed Gulbis. At the Cincinnati Masters, Sousa was defeated by Andy Murray in the second round. Sousa was also eliminated in the second round of the Winston-Salem Open. At that tournament's doubles competition, Sousa reach his third semifinal of the season, teaming up with Romanian Florin Mergea. At the 2014 US Open, Sousa became the first Portuguese player to be seeded at a Grand Slam tournament, with the 32nd seed at the singles competition. He started with a five-set win over Canadian Frank Dancevic. In the second round, he lost to David Goffin. In the doubles competition, Sousa partnered with Serbian Dušan Lajović and beat the Americans Marcos Giron and Kevin King in the first round. They eventually fell to 4th seed Marcelo Melo and Ivan Dodig in the second round.

In September, Sousa was selected to join Portugal Davis Cup team against Russia for the Europe/Africa's Group I Relegation Playoff. He lost both his singles and doubles matches, confirming the relegation of Portugal to Group II in 2015. Sousa rebounded at the 2014 Moselle Open with his second ATP singles final of the season, after defeating former ATP top-10 Gaël Monfils in the semifinals. He lost the final in straight sets to Goffin. Sousa followed this with a first-round loss to Benjamin Becker at the 2014 Malaysian Open, where Sousa was the defending champion, and dropped out of the Top-50 for the first time in 11 months. However, a quarterfinal appearance at the doubles tournament enabled him to enter the ATP doubles top-100 for the first time. He became the second Portuguese player to reach the top-100 of both ATP rankings, after Nuno Marques. It was the first time since January 1996 that a Portuguese player held a spot on the singles and doubles top-100s simultaneously. At the China Open, Sousa lost in the second round to reigning US Open champion Marin Čilić. He followed it with a debut at the Shanghai Masters, where he lost to Juan Mónaco in the first round. Sousa also lost in the first round at the Stockholm Open, but rebounded at the Valencia Open with his second career win over a top-10 doubles team, the defending champions Alexander Peya and Bruno Soares, in the first round. Alongside Leonardo Mayer, he reached his fourth doubles semifinal that season, the first at ATP 500 level. At the Paris Masters, Sousa suffered another early exit, ending his 2014 ATP tour campaign.

Sousa ended 2014 as world No. 54, failing to keep his top-50 status from the previous season. He became the first Portuguese player to maintain top-100 status by playing exclusively on the ATP World Tour in a single season. In November, he was nominated for the 2014 Portuguese Sportsman of the Year award, again losing to cyclist Rui Costa.

=== 2015: Second ATP title and quarterfinal at Grand Slam ===
Sousa began the 2015 season with an early round loss at the Auckland Open. At the 2015 Australian Open, he started his campaign with wins over wild card Jordan Thompson and Martin Kližan. He progressed to a third round match-up with 6th seed Andy Murray, becoming the second Portuguese player to reach that stage. Sousa lost in straight sets to Murray. In the doubles competition, Sousa partnered with Santiago Giraldo to reach the second round, where they lost to 2nd seeds Julien Benneteau and Édouard Roger-Vasselin. In February, Sousa participated at the Open Sud de France. After defeating Philipp Kohlschreiber in the quarterfinals, he lost in the semifinals to Jerzy Janowicz in three sets. After early round losses at the Rotterdam Open and Open 13, Sousa reached the second round of the Dubai Tennis Championships, where he was beaten by Murray. Sousa was then called for the Davis Cup team to face Morocco for the Europe/Africa Zone's Group II first round in early March. He won his singles rubber and partnered with Frederico Ferreira Silva to win the doubles rubber and close the tie in Portugal's favour. After injuring his knee and suffering breathing difficulties, Sousa was eliminated from both Indian Wells Masters and Miami Masters in the first round. He returned to Barcelona for recovery.

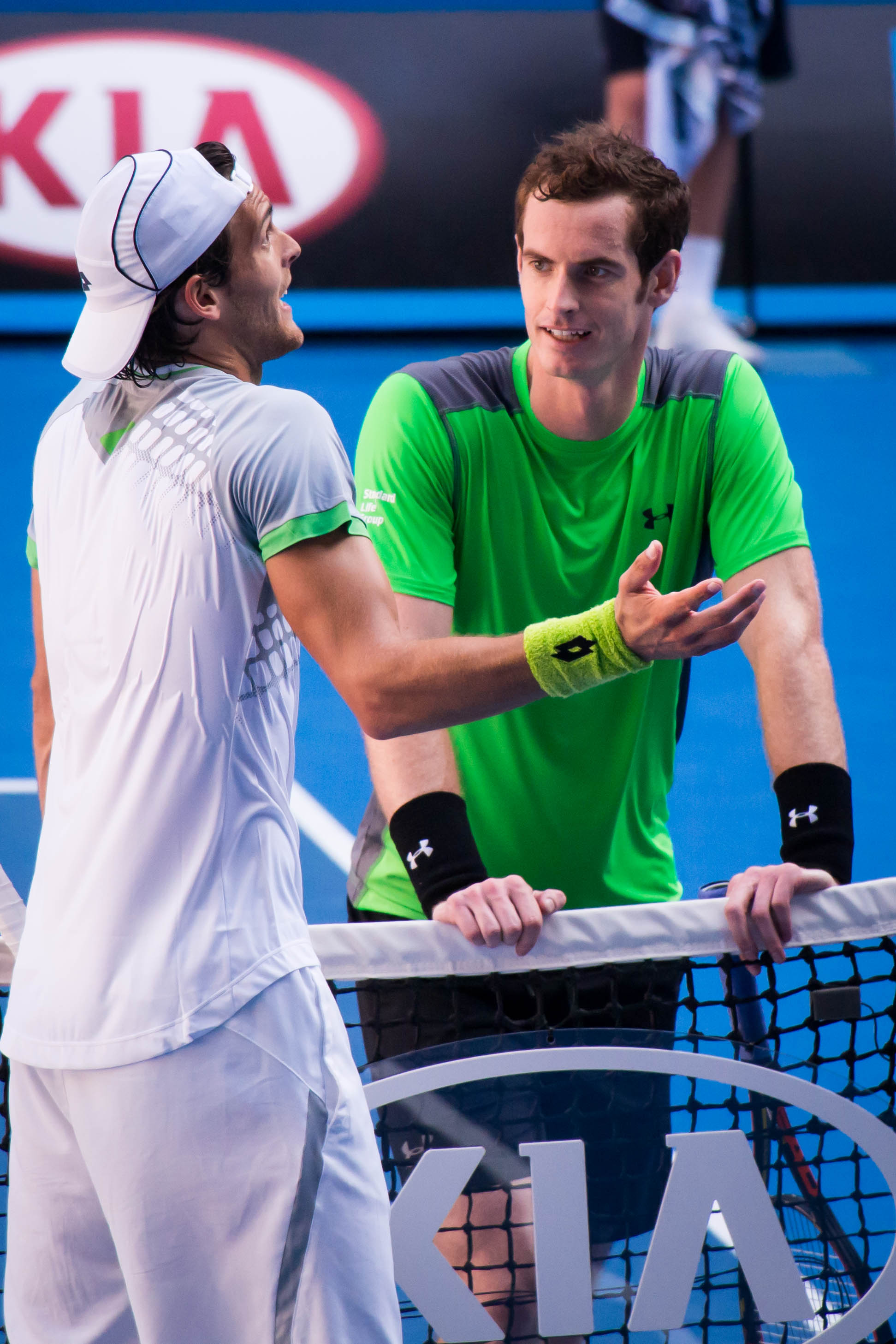
Sousa after the 2015 Australian Open third round match with Andy Murray

Sousa returned in April at the Monte-Carlo Masters, losing in the second round to Milos Raonic. At the Barcelona Open and Estoril Open, he lost in early rounds and then was eliminated from the Madrid Masters in the second round by Stan Wawrinka and from the Rome Masters in the first round by John Isner. At the Geneva Open, Sousa won a first round match over his Brazilian homophone João Souza, which was notable for the umpire needing to refer to each player by their nationality to distinguish between them during the calls. Sousa proceeded to the final, his first of the season, where he lost to Thomaz Bellucci. At the French Open, Sousa beat Canadian Vasek Pospisil in straight sets in the first round, and was defeated by 3rd seed Andy Murray in the second round. In the men's doubles of the tournament, Sousa partnered with Bellucci and was knocked out in the first round by 11th seeds Jamie Murray and John Peers. In June, Sousa did not have a strong grass court season; he was defeated in the early rounds at the Rosmalen Grass Court Championships, the Queen's Club Championships and the Nottingham Open. At Wimbledon, Sousa was again eliminated in straight sets in the first round by French Open champion and 4th seed Stan Wawrinka. His results did not improve in the men's doubles competition, from which he was eliminated in the first round while partnering with Santiago Giraldo.

At the Davis Cup Group II second round against Finland, Sousa rebounded with wins in his two singles rubbers and in the doubles rubber with Gastão Elias. At the Croatia Open, he beat in succession Andreas Seppi, Fabio Fognini and Roberto Bautista Agut to reach his second final in 2015. Sousa lost the final to Dominic Thiem. After a quarterfinal exit at the Swiss Open, He suffered a first-round loss to Bernard Tomic at the Canada Masters and reached the second round at the Cincinnati Masters, where he lost to Marin Čilić. Following a brief appearance at the Winston-Salem Open, Sousa was defeated at the US Open by Ričardas Berankis in five sets in the first round. In the men's doubles competition, Sousa became the second Portuguese player to reach the quarterfinals of a Grand Slam event after Nuno Marques, also in men's doubles at the 2000 Australian Open. Sousa and his partner Argentinian Leonardo Mayer were denied a presence in the semifinals by Americans Sam Querrey and Steve Johnson.

Sousa returned to the Davis Cup in September to help Portugal defeat Belarus and gain promotion to Europe/Africa Zone's Group I in 2016. Despite losing his first singles rubber, he won the doubles rubber with Elias and the deciding singles rubber against Uladzimir Ignatik. At the St. Petersburg Open, Sousa reached his third final of the season. Following wins over Marcel Granollers, Simone Bolelli and Dominic Thiem, Sousa was runner-up to Milos Raonic in three sets. In October, Sousa entered on a 1–4 run with early round losses at the Malaysian Open, the Japan Open, the Shanghai Masters and the Kremlin Cup. At the Valencia Open, Sousa capped the season with his second career ATP title and the first of the season in four final attempts. After beating four higher-ranked players, including Benoît Paire, Sousa defeated 7th seed Roberto Bautista Agut in the final in three sets. He reached a new career-high ranking in the following week at world No. 34. Sousa finished the season at career-high world No. 33 with 38 singles wins. In November, he received the award for Tennis Personality of the Year for the second time from the Portuguese Tennis Federation and the Confederação do Desporto de Portugal.

During 2015, physiotherapist Carlos Costa, known for his work with Tommy Haas, occasionally joined Sousa's entourage in selected tournaments; Sousa wanted to have a part-time member in his team responsible for that area. In 2016, Costa is expected to follow Sousa for at least 10 weeks but will remain focused on Haas' return until Wimbledon.

=== 2016: Top 30 and first Masters 1000 quarterfinals ===
After training at Rafael Nadal's home ground in the pre-season, Sousa began the 2016 season with a first-round loss to Fabio Fognini at the Auckland Open. Due to Richard Gasquet's absence by injury, he became the first Portuguese ever to be seeded at the Australian Open, entering the singles main draw as the 32nd seed. Following wins over Mikhail Kukushkin and Santiago Giraldo, Sousa lost in the third round to world No. 2 Andy Murray for the second successive year. In the doubles event, Sousa partnered with Leonardo Mayer but the pair were eliminated in the first round.

In April, Sousa reached his first Masters 1000 quarterfinals at the Mutua Madrid Open 2016, after beating Nicolas Mahut, lucky loser Marcel Granollers and Jack Sock. He lost to Rafael Nadal in three sets. His clay season ended with a second-round exit at the French Open, where he lost to Ernests Gulbis in four sets.

In June, Sousa entered Wimbledon as 31st seed. After beating Dmitry Tursunov in five sets and Dennis Novikov in four sets, he lost to Jiří Veselý in the third round, making for his best run ever at Wimbledon.

Sousa entered the 2016 Rogers Cup where he lost in the 1st round 6–3, 6–3 to semi-finalist Gaël Monfils. At the 2016 Olympic Games in Rio de Janeiro, Sousa won his first match but lost in the next round in three sets to eventual silver medalist Juan Martín del Potro. Three weeks later at the 2016 US Open, he inflicted the heaviest defeat of the Men's singles draw, defeating Víctor Estrella Burgos in the first round conceding only 2 games in 3 sets. He went on to defeat Feliciano López in 4 sets but his run ended losing to a resurgent Grigor Dimitrov.

After dropping the points from the 2015 Valencia Open in late October, Sousa finished the season at 43rd in the ATP rankings, with just over 1,000 points.

=== 2017: Two ATP finals ===
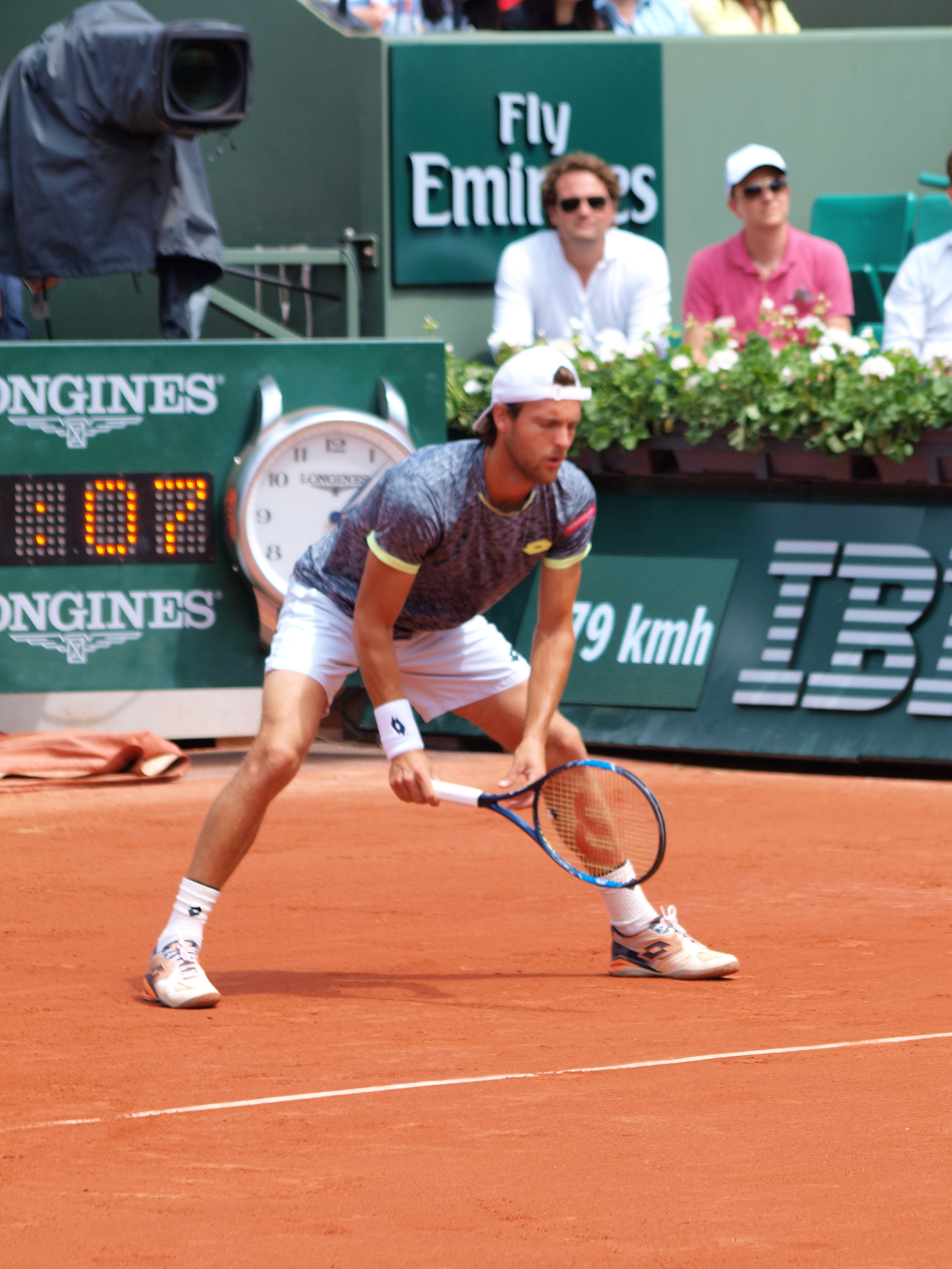
Sousa at the 2017 French Open

João Sousa trained with Rafael Nadal in the offseason for the second year running. He started the 2017 season at the 2017 Auckland Open once again, where he reached the final after beating Albert Ramos Viñolas, Brydan Klein, Robin Haase and Marcos Baghdatis. He lost in three sets to Jack Sock, but the result allowed him to re-enter the Top 40 in the ATP Singles Rankings. Sousa's January ended with a first-round exit at the Australian Open, having lost in five sets to Jordan Thompson, his worst result at this Grand Slam since 2014.

Sousa started the South American swing at the Argentina Open, having lost in the quarter-finals to eventual finalist Kei Nishikori. At the Rio Open, Sousa crashed out in the first round, losing in two sets to Roberto Carballés Baena, in a match that lasted just under an hour. His last clay tournament in South America was the Brasil Open, where he lost in the semi-finals to Albert Ramos Viñolas in three sets.

In March, Sousa entered the first two Masters 1000 tournaments of the season. At the BNP Paribas Open, he lost to Mischa Zverev in the second round. At the Miami Open, Sousa entered as 30th seed, receiving a bye for the first round, but lost in the second round to Fabio Fognini.

Sousa's late May ended with second round at the French Open, having lost to three sets to Serbian number 2's Novak Djokovic by 6–1, 6–4, 6–3. But, Sousa already won at first round with Serbia's Janko Tipsarević, having won by four sets by 4–6, 7–6 (7–3), 6–2, 6–2.

After the clay court season was over, he continued a streak of consecutive losses, losing matches to Philipp Kohlschreiber, Radu Albot and Dustin Brown at the Gerry Weber Open, Antalya Open and Wimbledon respectively.

Sousa's streak remained active in Croatia Open Umag, losing in 3 sets to Aljaž Bedene. However, he would eventually turn it around winning by reaching the quarterfinals in Swiss Open Gstaad and reaching the final in Generali Open Kitzbühel.

He would go on to have more losses in the remainder of the year and not many more wins. One of these includes two crucial defeats in the Davis Cup where Portugal could have qualified for the World Group for the first time in its history, specially considering the absence of the Zverev brothers and Kohlschreiber.

=== 2018–2019: Historic home title, Grand Slam fourth rounds ===
In 2018, Sousa made the third round of the Indian Wells Masters and the fourth round of the Miami Masters. At Indian Wells, he defeated 4th seed and world number 5 Alexander Zverev in the second round before losing to 32nd seed Milos Raonic in three sets. At Miami, he defeated 7th seed and world number 9 David Goffin in the second round only losing one game in the process before losing to 19th seed Chung Hyeon in straight sets.

Sousa became the first Portuguese player to win his home title in Estoril, after beating Daniil Medvedev, countryman Pedro Sousa, Kyle Edmund, Stefanos Tsitsipas and Frances Tiafoe.

He reached the fourth round of a Grand Slam at the 2018 US Open for the first time in his career, losing to eventual champion Novak Djokovic.

Sousa failed to defend his title at the following 2019 Estoril, losing to David Goffin in the second round.

He reached the fourth round at 2019 Wimbledon for the first time at this Major, losing to Rafael Nadal.

=== 2020–2021: Dip in form and rankings, out of top 150, 200th ATP career win ===
Throughout 2020 and 2021, Sousa showed a severe dip in form. Since the beginning of 2020, Sousa posted a win–loss record of 1–20 on the ATP tour and his ranking plummeted from No. 58 at the beginning of 2020 to No. 147 as of July 26, 2021. It was the first time since 2013 that Sousa had fallen outside the top 100 in singles rankings.

At the 2020 Davis Cup Sousa defeated Romanian Filip Cristian Jianu to record his 200th career win.

=== 2022: First ATP title and a final since 2018, back to top 60 ===
At the 2022 Australian Open, Sousa participated in the qualifications to enter the men's singles main draw as a qualifier. He fell short of doing so, as he lost to Radu Albot in the final round of qualifying. Sousa would still end up entering the main draw as a lucky loser, facing Jannik Sinner and losing in straight sets.

After being in a serious slump for more than 2 years, Sousa finally earned one of his best results in recent years, winning his 4th career singles title in Pune. He defeated Emil Ruusuvuori in the final to win his first tour-level title since 2018. As a result, he moved 51 positions up, returning into the top 100 to No. 86 on 7 February 2022. Later he returned to the top 65 at World No. 63 on 23 May 2022 by moving 16 spots up, after reaching his second final of the season at the 2022 Geneva Open without dropping a set, earning his biggest win in three years over World No. 25 and fifth seed Nikoloz Basilashvili en route. He lost to top seed Casper Ruud serving for the match in the third set. It was the longest championship match of the season in both time (3 hours 4 minutes) and games (36).

At the 2022 French Open, he played another long match five sets match (4 hours 23 minutes) against debutant Tseng Chun-hsin in the first round, this time coming up as a winner.

Using a protected ranking at the US Open, he reached the quarterfinals for the third time at this Major with his partner Marcelo Demoliner.

He ended the season with a first round loss in the qualifications for the 2022 Rolex Paris Masters to second seed Lorenzo Sonego.

=== 2023–2024: Retirement ===
He lost in the first round at the 2023 ASB Classic and at the 2023 Australian Open. At the 2023 Córdoba Open he reached the quarterfinals defeating Tomas Martin Etcheverry and Cristian Garín. He lost in the first rounds in the next Golden Swing tournaments at the 2023 Argentina Open, 2023 Rio Open and 2023 Chile Open.

In February 2024, Sousa announced that he would retire from professional tennis. His final appearance was at the 2024 Estoril Open.

== Playing style ==
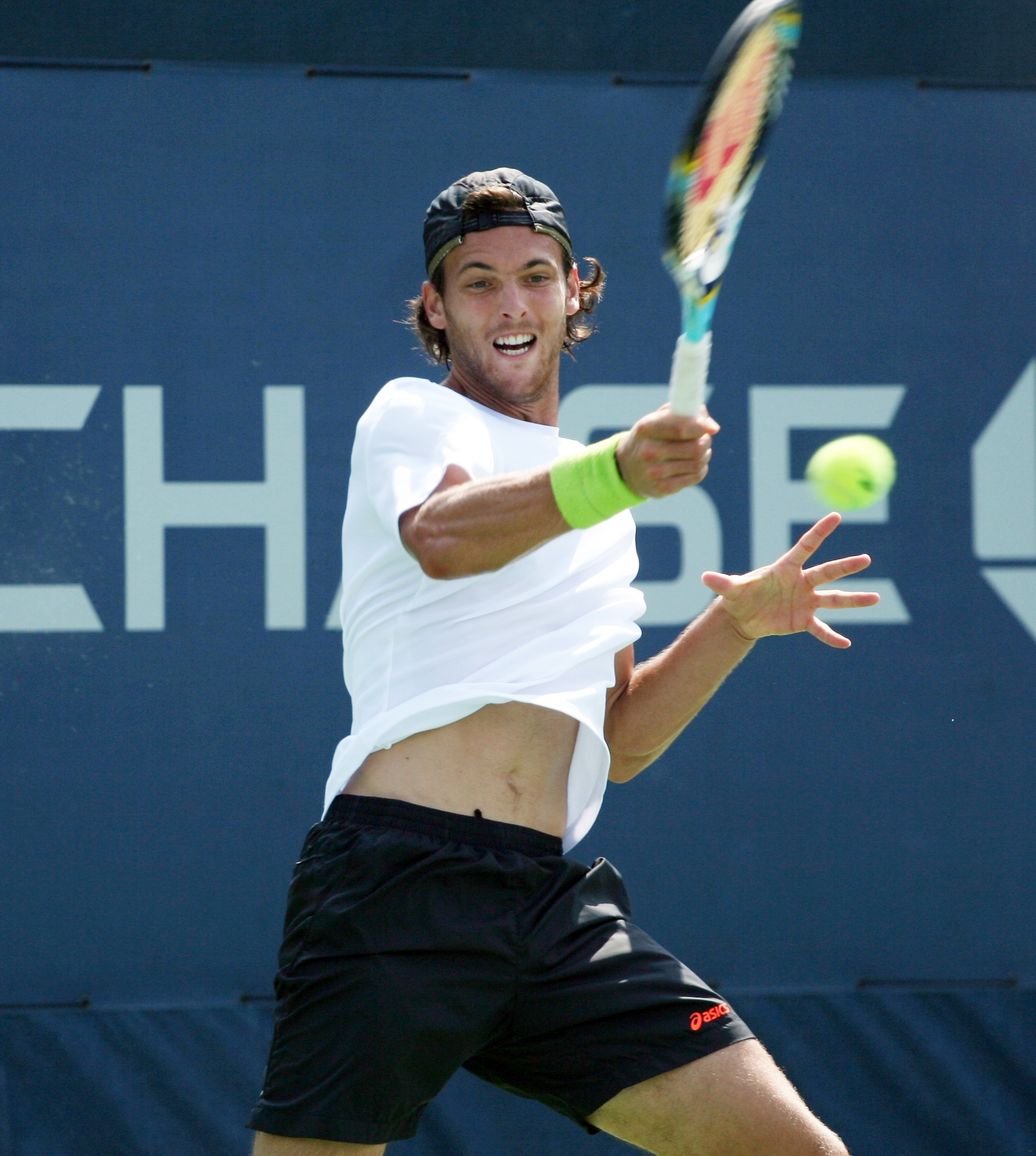
Sousa hitting a forehand during 2013 US Open.

Sousa's game is strongly based on his serve and forehand. He is right-handed and plays with a two-handed backhand. Sousa has said the forehand is his favourite shot and that he prefers playing on clay courts. He is known for expressing his emotions on court at times, often focusing on his coach or the umpire. Andy Murray described Sousa as a tough opponent who never backs down from a fight, while Novak Djokovic called him a "tough" and mentally strong player who "takes the best out of the opponent". Jamie Murray said Sousa has a "good forehand" and "likes playing on clay", despite his better results on hard courts. He has been described as having the potential of becoming a top-20 player.

Sousa's game pattern has become more offensive-minded and consistent, and his game has evolved in recent years from playing on clay to becoming more proficient on other surfaces. He won his first Challenger title on hard courts in July 2013 in his hometown Guimarães. Later in September, Sousa went on an 8–1 run to cap his semifinal run at the 2013 St. Petersburg Open and win the title at the 2013 Proton Malaysian Open, both ATP tour hard-court indoor tournaments. He continued his form on faster courts in 2014, with deep runs on grass courts at the 2014 Gerry Weber Open and Topshelf Open, and a final appearance in a hard court indoor tournament at the 2014 Moselle Open. Despite a results slump on clay earlier in the season, he still achieved his first ATP tour-level final on clay at the 2014 Swedish Open, and, eventually triumphing in home turf at the 2018 Estoril Open.

== Equipment and endorsements ==
As of October 2013, Sousa has been represented by Polaris Sports, a subsidiary of Jorge Mendes's Gestifute, which manages the career of other major Portuguese sportspeople, including Cristiano Ronaldo. Sousa uses a Wilson racquet, and is endorsed by Lotto Sport Italia since January 2014, in a two-year partnership which covers the supply of footwear, clothing and accessories. In May 2015, Sousa started a partnership with sports supplements company Gold Nutrition. Sousa's endorsement of sporting attires was switched to Joma in 2020.

Portuguese clothing brand Mike Davis announced an agreement with Sousa to associate him with the brand's casual sportswear during 2014. Portuguese private bank BES was another endorser of Sousa's career before its bailout in August 2014. In February 2015, private bank Millennium BCP announced a sponsorship agreement with Sousa.

Earlier in his career, Sousa said he struggled to find local endorsements and also lamented the financial struggles of the Portuguese Tennis Federation, which prevented support for his growing participation in the ATP Tour. He criticized local government for lack of support of sports other than football. During his junior and early professional career, Sousa's expenses were supported mainly by his parents and through bank loans.

== Career statistics ==
=== Grand Slam tournament performance timelines ===
Key
| W | F | SF | QF | #R | RR | Q# | DNQ | A | NH |

(W) winner; (F) finalist; (SF) semifinalist; (QF) quarterfinalist; (#R) rounds 4, 3, 2, 1; (RR) round-robin stage; (Q#) qualification round; (DNQ) did not qualify; (A) absent; (NH) not held; (SR) strike rate (events won / competed); (W–L) win–loss record.
To avoid confusion and double counting, these charts are updated at the conclusion of a tournament or when the player's participation has ended.

==== Singles ====
Current through the 2023 French Open.

| Tournament | 2011 | 2012 | 2013 | 2014 | 2015 | 2016 | 2017 | 2018 | 2019 | 2020 | 2021 | 2022 | 2023 | SR | W–L | Win % |
|---|---|---|---|---|---|---|---|---|---|---|---|---|---|---|---|---|
| Australian Open | Q1 | Q3 | 2R | 1R | 3R | 3R | 1R | 2R | 3R | 1R | A | 1R | 1R | 0 / 10 | 8–10 | 44% |
| French Open | A | 1R | 2R | 1R | 2R | 2R | 2R | 1R | 1R | 1R | 1R | 2R | Q1 | 0 / 11 | 5–11 | 31% |
| Wimbledon | Q1 | Q2 | Q3 | 1R | 1R | 3R | 1R | 1R | 4R | NH | 1R | 1R | A | 0 / 8 | 5–8 | 38% |
| US Open | Q2 | Q1 | 3R | 2R | 1R | 3R | 1R | 4R | 1R | 1R | Q1 | 2R | A | 0 / 9 | 9–9 | 50% |
| Win–loss | 0–0 | 0–1 | 4–3 | 1–4 | 3–4 | 7–4 | 1–4 | 4–4 | 5–4 | 0–3 | 0–2 | 2–4 | 0–1 | 0 / 38 | 27–38 | 42% |

==== Doubles ====
| Tournament | 2013 | 2014 | 2015 | 2016 | 2017 | 2018 | 2019 | 2020 | 2021 | 2022 | 2023 | SR | W–L | Win % |
|---|---|---|---|---|---|---|---|---|---|---|---|---|---|---|
| Australian Open | A | 1R | 2R | 1R | 1R | 2R | SF | 1R | A | A | 1R | 0 / 8 | 6–8 | 43% |
| French Open | A | 3R | 1R | 2R | 1R | 3R | 1R | 1R | A | 1R | A | 0 / 8 | 5–8 | 38% |
| Wimbledon | Q1 | 1R | 1R | 1R | 1R | 3R | 2R | NH | A | 2R | A | 0 / 7 | 4–7 | 36% |
| US Open | A | 2R | QF | 1R | 1R | 2R | QF | A | A | QF | A | 0 / 7 | 11–7 | 61% |
| Win–loss | 0–0 | 3–4 | 4–4 | 1–4 | 0–4 | 6–4 | 8–4 | 0–2 | 0–0 | 4–3 | 0–1 | 0 / 30 | 26–30 | 46% |

=== ATP Masters 1000 finals ===
==== Doubles: 1 (1 runner-up) ====
| Result | Year | Tournament | Surface | Partner | Opponents | Score |
|---|---|---|---|---|---|---|
| Loss | 2018 | Italian Open | Clay | (Spain) Pablo Carreño Busta | (Colombia) Juan Sebastián Cabal (Colombia) Robert Farah | 6–3, 4–6, [4–10] |

== Awards ==
- 2013 – CDP Portuguese Tennis Personality of the Year
- 2014 – CNID Portuguese Athlete of the Year
- 2015 – CDP Portuguese Tennis Personality of the Year
