= 2016 Columbus Challenger 2 – Singles =

Singles
- 2016 Columbus Challenger 2

Final
- Champion: (United States) Stefan Kozlov
- Runner-up: (United States) Tennys Sandgren
- Score: 6–1, 2–6, 6–2

Events
Singles	Doubles
← 2016 ·	Columbus Challenger	· 2017 →

Mikael Torpegaard was the defending champion but lost in the first round to Taylor Fritz.

Stefan Kozlov won the title after defeating Tennys Sandgren 6–1, 2–6, 6–2 in the final.

== Seeds ==
1. (United States) Taylor Fritz (quarterfinals)
2. (United States) Rajeev Ram (withdrew)
3. (Switzerland) Henri Laaksonen (semifinals)
4. (United States) Stefan Kozlov (champion)
5. (United States) Mitchell Krueger (second round)
6. (United States) Tennys Sandgren (final)
7. (United States) Austin Krajicek (first round)
8. (Republic of Ireland) Sam Barry (semifinals)

== Draw ==
=== Key ===
- Q = Qualifier
- WC = Wild card
- LL = Lucky loser
- Alt = Alternate
- SE = Special exempt
- PR = Protected ranking
- ITF = ITF entry
- JE = Junior exempt
- w/o = Walkover
- r = Retired
- d = Defaulted
- SR = Special ranking

=== Finals ===
Semifinals
8	(Republic of Ireland) Sam Barry	5	6^{6}
4	(United States) Stefan Kozlov	7	7^{8}
3	(Switzerland) Henri Laaksonen	2	7	4
6	(United States) Tennys Sandgren	6	5	6

Final
4	(United States) Stefan Kozlov	6	2	6
6	(United States) Tennys Sandgren	1	6	2

=== Top half ===
First round
1	(United States) T Fritz	7^{7}	6
(Denmark) M Torpegaard	6^{3}	1
(Latvia) M Lībietis	5	6	7^{7}
WC	(Canada) Hugo Di Feo	7	2	6^{3}
(United States) Jared Hiltzik	7^{8}	3	4
(United States) Dennis Nevolo	6^{6}	6	6
Q	(United States) S Kirchheimer	5	4
8	(Republic of Ireland) S Barry	7	6
4	(United States) S Kozlov	6	7^{8}
(New Zealand) J Statham	2	6^{6}
(United States) M Giron	6^{3}	4
(Germany) D Köpfer	7^{7}	6
WC	(United States) Martin Joyce	6^{5}	2
Alt	(United States) K King	7^{7}	6
(United States) C Harrison	6	7
7/Alt	(United States) A Krajicek	2	5

Second round
1	(United States) T Fritz	6	6
(Latvia) M Lībietis	3	3
(United States) D Nevolo	4	2
8	(Republic of Ireland) S Barry	6	6
4	(United States) S Kozlov	6	6
(Germany) D Köpfer	3	4
Alt	(United States) K King	6	6
(United States) C Harrison	3	3

Quarterfinals
1	(United States) T Fritz	4	6^{2}
8	(Republic of Ireland) S Barry	6	7^{7}
4	(United States) S Kozlov	6	7
Alt	(United States) K King	2	5

Semifinals
8	(Republic of Ireland) S Barry	5	6^{6}
4	(United States) S Kozlov	7	7^{8}

=== Bottom half ===
First round
5	(United States) M Krueger	6	6
Q	(United States) Hunter Callahan	4	3
(South Africa) T Vorster	4	5
(United States) P Kobelt	6	7
WC	(Finland) H Pöllänen	1	3
WC	(United States) J McNally	6	6
Q	(United States) JC Aragone	3	3
3	(Switzerland) H Laaksonen	6	6
6	(United States) T Sandgren	6	6
(United States) Andrew Carter	2	2
(United States) E Quigley	6^{3}	6	6
Q	(United States) Aron Hiltzik	7^{7}	3	2
(United Kingdom) C Norrie	6	7^{13}
(United States) R Sarmiento	4	6^{11}
(Italy) Erik Crepaldi	3	2
LL	(United Kingdom) L Bambridge	6	6

Second round
5	(United States) M Krueger	6^{5}	4
(United States) P Kobelt	7^{7}	6
WC	(United States) J McNally	4	3
3	(Switzerland) H Laaksonen	6	6
6	(United States) T Sandgren	6	6
(United States) E Quigley	2	4
(United Kingdom) C Norrie	7^{7}	6
LL	(United Kingdom) L Bambridge	6^{3}	4

Quarterfinals
(United States) P Kobelt	4	5
3	(Switzerland) H Laaksonen	6	7
6	(United States) T Sandgren	6	6^{3}	6
(United Kingdom) C Norrie	2	7^{7}	3

Semifinals
3	(Switzerland) H Laaksonen	2	7	4
6	(United States) T Sandgren	6	5	6
