= 2016 Columbus Challenger 2 =

- Date: 21–27 November
- Edition: 3rd
- Draw: 32S / 16D
- Prize money: $75,000
- Surface: Hard / Indoors
- Location: Columbus, United States

Champions

Singles
- (United States) Stefan Kozlov

Doubles
- (Republic of Ireland) David O'Hare / (United Kingdom) Joe Salisbury
← 2016 ·	Columbus Challenger	· 2017 →

The 2016 Columbus Challenger 2 was a professional tennis tournament played on indoor hard courts. It was the third edition of the tournament which was part of the 2016 ATP Challenger Tour. It took place in Columbus, United States between 21 and 27 November 2016.

== Singles main draw entrants ==
=== Seeds ===
Country	Player	Rank^{1}	Seed
USA	Taylor Fritz	70	1
~~USA~~	~~Rajeev Ram~~	~~129~~	~~2~~
SUI	Henri Laaksonen	141	3
USA	Stefan Kozlov	141	4
USA	Mitchell Krueger	211	5
USA	Tennys Sandgren	232	6
USA	Austin Krajicek	235	7
IRL	Sam Barry	284	8

- ^{1} Rankings are as of November 14, 2016.

=== Other entrants ===
The following players received entry into the singles main draw as wildcards:

- (Canada) Hugo Di Feo
- (United States) Martin Joyce
- (Finland) Herkko Pöllänen
- (United States) John McNally

The following players received entry as alternates:

- (United States) Kevin King
- (United States) Austin Krajicek

The following players received entry from the qualifying draw:

- (United States) JC Aragone
- (United States) Hunter Callahan
- (United States) Aron Hiltzik
- (United States) Strong Kirchheimer

The following player received entry as a lucky loser:

- (United Kingdom) Luke Bambridge

== Champions ==
=== Singles ===
- (United States) Stefan Kozlov def. (United States) Tennys Sandgren 6–1, 2–6, 6–2.

=== Doubles ===
- (Republic of Ireland) David O'Hare / (United Kingdom) Joe Salisbury def. (United Kingdom) Luke Bambridge / (United Kingdom) Cameron Norrie, 6–3, 6–4.
