= 2017 Columbus Challenger =

- Date: 18–24 September
- Edition: 4th
- Draw: 32S / 16D
- Surface: Hard / Indoors
- Location: Columbus, United States

Champions

Singles
- (Croatia) Ante Pavić

Doubles
- (Germany) Dominik Köpfer / (United States) Denis Kudla
- Columbus Challenger

The 2017 Columbus Challenger was a professional tennis tournament played on indoor hard courts. It was the fourth edition of the tournament which was part of the 2017 ATP Challenger Tour. It took place in Columbus, United States between 18 and 24 September 2017.

== Singles main draw entrants ==
=== Seeds ===
Country	Player	Rank^{1}	Seed
FRA	Quentin Halys	127	1
IND	Ramkumar Ramanathan	154	2
IND	Yuki Bhambri	157	3
USA	Denis Kudla	176	4
USA	Mackenzie McDonald	201	5
CAN	Brayden Schnur	202	6
USA	Dennis Novikov	206	7
CHI	Christian Garín	214	8

- ^{1} Rankings are as of September 11, 2017.

=== Other entrants ===
The following players received entry into the singles main draw as wildcards:

- (United States) Martin Joyce
- (United States) John McNally
- (United States) Kyle Seelig
- (United States) J. J. Wolf

The following players received entry into the singles main draw using protected rankings:

- (Canada) Frank Dancevic
- (United States) Kevin King
- (United Kingdom) Alexander Ward

The following player received entry into the singles main draw as an alternate:

- (Croatia) Ante Pavić

The following players received entry from the qualifying draw:

- (United Kingdom) Luke Bambridge
- (Australia) Matthew Barton
- (United States) Jared Hiltzik
- (Australia) Aleksandar Vukic

== Champions ==
=== Singles ===
- (Croatia) Ante Pavić def. (United Kingdom) Alexander Ward 6–7^{(11–13)}, 6–4, 6–3.

=== Doubles ===
- (Germany) Dominik Köpfer / (United States) Denis Kudla def. (United Kingdom) Luke Bambridge / (Republic of Ireland) David O'Hare 7–6^{(8–6)}, 7–6^{(7–3)}.
