= 2016 Columbus Challenger 2 – Doubles =

Doubles
- 2016 Columbus Challenger 2

Final
- Champions: (Republic of Ireland) David O'Hare (United Kingdom) Joe Salisbury
- Runners-up: (United Kingdom) Luke Bambridge (United Kingdom) Cameron Norrie
- Score: 6–3, 6–4

Events
| Singles | Doubles |
| ← 2016 · | Columbus Challenger | · 2017 → |

Miķelis Lībietis and Dennis Novikov were the defending champions but only Lībietis chose to defend his title, partnering Tennys Sandgren. Lībietis lost in the first round to Sam Barry and Peter Kobelt.

David O'Hare and Joe Salisbury won the title after defeating Luke Bambridge and Cameron Norrie 6–3, 6–4 in the final.

== Seeds ==
1. (Australia) Jarryd Chaplin / (New Zealand) Ben McLachlan (first round)
2. (Mexico) Hans Hach Verdugo / (South Africa) Dean O'Brien (quarterfinals)
3. (South Africa) Ruan Roelofse / (South Africa) Tucker Vorster (quarterfinals)
4. (Republic of Ireland) David O'Hare / (United Kingdom) Joe Salisbury (champions)

== Draw ==
=== Key ===
- Q = Qualifier
- WC = Wild card
- LL = Lucky loser
- Alt = Alternate
- SE = Special exempt
- PR = Protected ranking
- ITF = ITF entry
- JE = Junior exempt
- w/o = Walkover
- r = Retired
- d = Defaulted
- SR = Special ranking

First round
1 | (Australia) Jarryd Chaplin (New Zealand) B McLachlan | 6^{3} | 6 | [7]
(United Kingdom) L Bambridge (United Kingdom) C Norrie | 7^{7} | 3 | [10]
(United States) S Kozlov (United States) A Reed | 6 | 6
(United States) M Giron (United States) N Meister | 4 | 4
3 | (South Africa) R Roelofse (South Africa) T Vorster | 4 | 6 | [10]
(United States) E King (United States) R Sarmiento | 6 | 4 | [4]
(United States) M Krueger (United States) A Lawson | 6 | 7
Alt | (United States) Andrew Carter (Italy) Erik Crepaldi | 3 | 5
(Republic of Ireland) S Barry (United States) P Kobelt | 6 | 7^{7}
(Latvia) M Lībietis (United States) T Sandgren | 3 | 6^{3}
(United States) A Krajicek (United States) J Withrow | 3 | 6 | [8]
4 | (Republic of Ireland) D O'Hare (United Kingdom) J Salisbury | 6 | 4 | [10]
WC | (United States) Matthew Mendez (United States) Hunter Tubert | 4 | 3
WC | (Finland) H Pöllänen (Denmark) M Torpegaard | 6 | 6
WC | (Canada) Hugo Di Feo (United States) Martin Joyce | 1 | 3
2 | (Mexico) H Hach Verdugo (South Africa) D O'Brien | 6 | 6

Quarterfinals
(United Kingdom) L Bambridge (United Kingdom) C Norrie | 6 | 7
(United States) S Kozlov (United States) A Reed | 4 | 5
3 | (South Africa) R Roelofse (South Africa) T Vorster | 3 | 4
(United States) M Krueger (United States) A Lawson | 6 | 6
(Republic of Ireland) S Barry (United States) P Kobelt | 6^{3} | 7^{9} | [15]
4 | (Republic of Ireland) D O'Hare (United Kingdom) J Salisbury | 7^{7} | 6^{7} | [17]
WC | (Finland) H Pöllänen (Denmark) M Torpegaard | 6 | 4 | [10]
2 | (Mexico) H Hach Verdugo (South Africa) D O'Brien | 4 | 6 | [6]

Semifinals
(United Kingdom) L Bambridge (United Kingdom) C Norrie | 7 | 6
(United States) M Krueger (United States) A Lawson | 5 | 1
4 | (Republic of Ireland) D O'Hare (United Kingdom) J Salisbury | 1 | 7 | [18]
WC | (Finland) H Pöllänen (Denmark) M Torpegaard | 6 | 5 | [16]

Final
(United Kingdom) L Bambridge (United Kingdom) C Norrie | 3 | 4
4 | (Republic of Ireland) D O'Hare (United Kingdom) J Salisbury | 6 | 6
