= 2017 Columbus Challenger – Singles =

Singles
- 2017 Columbus Challenger

Final
- Champion: (Croatia) Ante Pavić
- Runner-up: (United Kingdom) Alexander Ward
- Score: 6–7^{(11–13)}, 6–4, 6–3

Events
Singles	Doubles
- Columbus Challenger

Stefan Kozlov was the defending champion but chose not to defend his title.

Ante Pavić won the title after defeating Alexander Ward 6–7^{(11–13)}, 6–4, 6–3 in the final.

== Seeds ==
1. (France) Quentin Halys (quarterfinals)
2. (India) Ramkumar Ramanathan (second round)
3. (India) Yuki Bhambri (first round, retired)
4. (United States) Denis Kudla (quarterfinals)
5. (United States) Mackenzie McDonald (first round)
6. (Canada) Brayden Schnur (first round)
7. (United States) Dennis Novikov (semifinals)
8. (Chile) Christian Garín (first round)

== Draw ==
Key

- Q = Qualifier
- WC = Wild card
- LL = Lucky loser
- Alt = Alternate
- ITF = ITF entry
- PR = Protected ranking
- SR = Special ranking
- SE = Special exempt
- JE = Junior exempt
- JR = Junior Accelerator Programme entrant
- CO = College Accelerator Programme entrant
- NG = Next Gen Accelerator Program entrant
- w/o = Walkover
- r = Retired
- d = Defaulted

=== Finals ===
Semifinals
7	(United States) Dennis Novikov	1	3
PR	(United Kingdom) Alexander Ward	6	6
PR	(Canada) Frank Dancevic	3	5
Alt	(Croatia) Ante Pavić	6	7

Final
PR	(United Kingdom) Alexander Ward	7^{13}	4	3
Alt	(Croatia) Ante Pavić	6^{11}	6	6

=== Top half ===
First round
1	(France) Q Halys	3	7^{7}	6
(United Kingdom) B Klein	6	6^{5}	1
WC	(United States) J McNally	6	3	3
PR	(United States) K King	4	6	6
(United States) A Krajicek	6	6
WC	(United States) Kyle Seelig	4	2
Q	(Australia) M Barton	7	1	3
7	(United States) D Novikov	5	6	6
4	(United States) D Kudla	6	6
(Germany) D Köpfer	4	4
Q	(United Kingdom) L Bambridge	4	2
WC	(United States) J. J. Wolf	6	6
(India) P Gunneswaran	6^{4}	6^{1}
WC	(United States) Martin Joyce	7^{7}	7^{7}
PR	(United Kingdom) A Ward	6	6
5	(United States) M McDonald	2	2

Second round
1	(France) Q Halys	6	6
PR	(United States) K King	3	2
(United States) A Krajicek	4	3
7	(United States) D Novikov	6	6
4	(United States) D Kudla	7	6
WC	(United States) J. J. Wolf	5	3
WC	(United States) M Joyce	6	2	3
PR	(United Kingdom) A Ward	4	6	6

Quarterfinals
1	(France) Q Halys	1	6	4
7	(United States) D Novikov	6	2	6
4	(United States) D Kudla	6	4	2
PR	(United Kingdom) A Ward	3	6	6

Semifinals
7	(United States) D Novikov	1	3
PR	(United Kingdom) A Ward	6	6

=== Bottom half ===
First round
6	(Canada) B Schnur	6	3	6^{5}
PR	(Canada) F Dancevic	4	6	7^{7}
Q	(United States) Jared Hiltzik	3	5
(Colombia) DE Galán	6	7
(United States) P Kobelt	6^{4}	6^{6}
(United States) E King	7^{7}	7^{8}
(Dominican Republic) J Hernández-Fernández	4	7^{7}	2
3	(India) Y Bhambri	6	6^{5}	0^{r}
8	(Chile) C Garín	4	3
Alt	(Croatia) A Pavić	6	6
Q	(Australia) A Vukic	5	5
(Ecuador) R Quiroz	7	7
(Denmark) M Torpegaard	6^{2}	4
(Canada) F Peliwo	7^{7}	6
(United States) S Bangoura	6^{7}	4
2	(India) R Ramanathan	7^{9}	6

Second round
PR	(Canada) F Dancevic	6	6
(Colombia) DE Galán	0	2
(United States) E King	6	7^{7}
(Dominican Republic) J Hernández-Fernández	4	6^{1}
Alt	(Croatia) A Pavić	6	6
(Ecuador) R Quiroz	1	2
(Canada) F Peliwo	6	6
2	(India) R Ramanathan	2	1

Quarterfinals
PR	(Canada) F Dancevic	7^{7}	7^{7}
(United States) E King	6^{5}	6^{4}
Alt	(Croatia) A Pavić	6^{9}	6	6
(Canada) F Peliwo	7^{11}	3	3

Semifinals
PR	(Canada) F Dancevic	3	5
Alt	(Croatia) A Pavić	6	7
