= 2016 Columbus Challenger 1 – Doubles =

Doubles
- 2016 Columbus Challenger 1

Final
- Champions: (Latvia) Miķelis Lībietis (United States) Dennis Novikov
- Runners-up: (Canada) Philip Bester (Canada) Peter Polansky
- Score: 7–5, 7–6^{(7–4)}

Events
Singles	Doubles
- Columbus Challenger

Chase Buchanan and Blaž Rola were the defending champions but chose not to defend their title.

Miķelis Lībietis and Dennis Novikov won the title after defeating Philip Bester and Peter Polansky 7–5, 7–6^{(7–4)} in the final.

== Seeds ==
1. (Australia) Sam Groth / (United States) Austin Krajicek (first round)
2. (Mexico) Miguel Ángel Reyes-Varela / (United States) Max Schnur (first round)
3. (Australia) Matt Reid / (Australia) John-Patrick Smith (first round)
4. (El Salvador) Marcelo Arévalo / (United States) Sekou Bangoura (first round)

== Draw ==
Key

- Q = Qualifier
- WC = Wild card
- LL = Lucky loser
- Alt = Alternate
- ITF = ITF entry
- PR = Protected ranking
- SR = Special ranking
- SE = Special exempt
- JE = Junior exempt
- JR = Junior Accelerator Programme entrant
- CO = College Accelerator Programme entrant
- NG = Next Gen Accelerator Program entrant
- w/o = Walkover
- r = Retired
- d = Defaulted

First round
1	(Australia) S Groth (United States) A Krajicek	4	6	[3]
(Latvia) M Lībietis (United States) D Novikov	6	3	[10]
(Italy) Erik Crepaldi (United States) E King	3	1
WC	(United States) J McNally (United States) J. J. Wolf	6	6
3	(Australia) M Reid (Australia) J-P Smith	3	7^{7}	[7]
(Australia) S de Waard (New Zealand) B McLachlan	6	6^{3}	[10]
(Republic of Ireland) D O'Hare (United Kingdom) J Salisbury	3	6	[5]
WC	(Finland) H Pöllänen (Denmark) M Torpegaard	6	4	[10]
(South Africa) N Scholtz (South Africa) T Vorster	1	6	[6]
(Brazil) G Clezar (Venezuela) LD Martínez	6	3	[10]
(Canada) P Bester (Canada) P Polansky	6	5	[10]
4	(El Salvador) M Arévalo (United States) S Bangoura	2	7	[7]
(United Kingdom) L Bambridge (United Kingdom) L Glasspool	7	6
WC	(Canada) Hugo Di Feo (United States) Martin Joyce	5	2
(United States) N Meister (United States) E Quigley	7^{7}	6
2	(Mexico) MÁ Reyes-Varela (United States) M Schnur	6^{2}	4

Quarterfinals
(Latvia) M Lībietis (United States) D Novikov	6	7^{7}
WC	(United States) J McNally (United States) J. J. Wolf	3	6^{3}
(Australia) S de Waard (New Zealand) B McLachlan	2	4
WC	(Finland) H Pöllänen (Denmark) M Torpegaard	6	6
(Brazil) G Clezar (Venezuela) LD Martínez	5	6	[6]
(Canada) P Bester (Canada) P Polansky	7	4	[10]
(United Kingdom) L Bambridge (United Kingdom) L Glasspool	6	3	[6]
(United States) N Meister (United States) E Quigley	4	6	[10]

Semifinals
(Latvia) M Lībietis (United States) D Novikov	7^{9}	7^{7}
WC	(Finland) H Pöllänen (Denmark) M Torpegaard	6^{7}	6^{0}
(Canada) P Bester (Canada) P Polansky	2	7^{7}	[10]
(United States) N Meister (United States) E Quigley	6	6^{5}	[6]

Final
(Latvia) M Lībietis (United States) D Novikov	7	7^{7}
(Canada) P Bester (Canada) P Polansky	5	6^{4}
