= 2015 Columbus Challenger – Singles =

Singles
- 2015 Columbus Challenger

Final
- Champion: (United States) Dennis Novikov
- Runner-up: (United States) Ryan Harrison
- Score: 6–3, 3–6, 6–3

Events
Singles	Doubles
- Columbus Challenger

This was the first edition of the tournament.

Dennis Novikov won the title after defeating Ryan Harrison 6–3, 3–6, 6–3 in the final.

== Seeds ==
1. (United States) Tim Smyczek (semifinals)
2. (Australia) John-Patrick Smith (second round)
3. (United States) Bjorn Fratangelo (quarterfinals)
4. (United States) Ryan Harrison (final)
5. (United States) Austin Krajicek (first round)
6. (Slovenia) Blaž Rola (first round)
7. (United Kingdom) Brydan Klein (second round)
8. (United States) Dennis Novikov (champion)

== Draw ==
Key

- Q = Qualifier
- WC = Wild card
- LL = Lucky loser
- Alt = Alternate
- ITF = ITF entry
- PR = Protected ranking
- SR = Special ranking
- SE = Special exempt
- JE = Junior exempt
- JR = Junior Accelerator Programme entrant
- CO = College Accelerator Programme entrant
- NG = Next Gen Accelerator Program entrant
- w/o = Walkover
- r = Retired
- d = Defaulted

=== Finals ===
Semifinals
1	(United States) Tim Smyczek	6^{5}	7^{7}	1
4	(United States) Ryan Harrison	7^{7}	6^{5}	6
(United States) Alex Kuznetsov	3	6	3
8	(United States) Dennis Novikov	6	3	6

Final
4	(United States) Ryan Harrison	4	6	3
8	(United States) Dennis Novikov	6	3	6

=== Top half ===
First round
1	(United States) T Smyczek	6	6^{5}	6
(United States) E Quigley	4	7^{7}	3
(United States) M Krueger	1	2
(United Kingdom) J Milton	6	6
Q	(South Africa) D O'Brien	3	1
(United States) S Bangoura	6	6
(New Zealand) J Statham	3	7^{8}	6
6	(Slovenia) B Rola	6	6^{6}	2
4	(United States) R Harrison	6	6
(Switzerland) A Bossel	4	2
(France) Q Halys	6	2	6
(Canada) P Bester	1	6	0
(Switzerland) H Laaksonen	6	6
(Australia) M Reid	2	4
(Zimbabwe) T Garanganga	6	3	6
5	(United States) A Krajicek	2	6	3

Second round
1	(United States) T Smyczek	6	6
(United Kingdom) J Milton	0	1
(United States) S Bangoura	7^{7}	6
(New Zealand) J Statham	6^{3}	4
4	(United States) R Harrison	6	6
(France) Q Halys	4	3
(Switzerland) H Laaksonen	7^{10}	6
(Zimbabwe) T Garanganga	6^{8}	4

Quarterfinals
1	(United States) T Smyczek	6	6
(United States) S Bangoura	3	3
4	(United States) R Harrison	6	6
(Switzerland) H Laaksonen	3	3

Semifinals
1	(United States) T Smyczek	6^{5}	7^{7}	1
4	(United States) R Harrison	7^{7}	6^{5}	6

=== Bottom half ===
First round
7	(United Kingdom) B Klein	6	6^{3}	6
Q	(Canada) Hugo Di Feo	1	7^{7}	3
(United States) Connor Smith	3	5
(United States) A Kuznetsov	6	7
Q	(South Africa) Damon Gooch	6	3	1
(Italy) A Bega	4	6	6
PR	(Canada) P Polansky	7	4	6^{1}
3	(United States) B Fratangelo	5	6	7^{7}
8	(United States) D Novikov	7^{7}	7^{7}
(United States) S Kozlov	6^{2}	6^{3}
Q	(United States) P Kobelt	6	1	3
(El Salvador) M Arévalo	2	6	6
PR	(United States) Dennis Nevolo	5	3
(United States) C Buchanan	7	6
(United Kingdom) D Cox	7^{11}	3	2
2	(Australia) J-P Smith	6^{9}	6	6

Second round
7	(United Kingdom) B Klein	2	2
(United States) A Kuznetsov	6	6
(Italy) A Bega	6	2	2
3	(United States) B Fratangelo	4	6	6
8	(United States) D Novikov	7^{7}	6^{4}	6
(El Salvador) M Arévalo	6^{2}	7^{7}	2
(United States) C Buchanan	6	7^{7}
2	(Australia) J-P Smith	4	6^{2}

Quarterfinals
(United States) A Kuznetsov	6	7^{7}
3	(United States) B Fratangelo	2	6^{5}
8	(United States) D Novikov	6	6
(United States) C Buchanan	4	4

Semifinals
(United States) A Kuznetsov	3	6	3
8	(United States) D Novikov	6	3	6
