= 2015 Columbus Challenger – Doubles =

Doubles
- 2015 Columbus Challenger

Final
- Champion: (United States) Chase Buchanan (Slovenia) Blaž Rola
- Runner-up: (United States) Mitchell Krueger (United States) Eric Quigley
- Score: 6–4, 4–6, [19–17]

Events
Singles	Doubles
- Columbus Challenger

This was the first edition of the tournament. Chase Buchanan and Blaž Rola won the title beating Mitchell Krueger and Eric Quigley in the final 6–4, 4–6, [19–17].

== Seeds ==
1. (South Africa) Dean O'Brien / (South Africa) Ruan Roelofse (quarterfinals)
2. (Australia) Carsten Ball / (Australia) Matt Reid (quarterfinals)
3. (Canada) Philip Bester / (Canada) Peter Polansky (quarterfinals)
4. (United States) Sekou Bangoura / (New Zealand) Jose Statham (quarterfinals)

== Draw ==
Key

- Q = Qualifier
- WC = Wild card
- LL = Lucky loser
- Alt = Alternate
- ITF = ITF entry
- PR = Protected ranking
- SR = Special ranking
- SE = Special exempt
- JE = Junior exempt
- JR = Junior Accelerator Programme entrant
- CO = College Accelerator Programme entrant
- NG = Next Gen Accelerator Program entrant
- w/o = Walkover
- r = Retired
- d = Defaulted

First round
(France) Q Halys (United Kingdom) J Milton	6	6
(Italy) A Bega (Zimbabwe) T Garanganga	2	3
(United States) Patrick Davidson (South Africa) Damon Gooch	2	1
(United States) C Buchanan (Slovenia) B Rola	6	6
(United States) M Krueger (United States) E Quigley	w/o
(El Salvador) M Arévalo (United Kingdom) D Cox
(United States) Hunter Callahan (Finland) H Pöllänen	2	6^{6}
4	(United States) S Bangoura (New Zealand) J Statham	6	7^{8}
(Switzerland) A Bossel (Switzerland) H Laaksonen	2	6	[11]
(United States) P Kobelt (United States) Connor Smith	6	2	[13]

Quarterfinals
1	(South Africa) D O'Brien (South Africa) R Roelofse	6	2	[8]
(France) Q Halys (United Kingdom) J Milton	3	6	[10]
3	(Canada) P Bester (Canada) P Polansky	4	3
(United States) C Buchanan (Slovenia) B Rola	6	6
(United States) M Krueger (United States) E Quigley	6	7^{8}
4	(United States) S Bangoura (New Zealand) J Statham	3	6^{6}
(United States) P Kobelt (United States) C Smith	6^{5}	6	[10]
2	(Australia) C Ball (Australia) M Reid	7^{7}	2	[6]

Semifinals
(France) Q Halys (United Kingdom) J Milton	4	1
(United States) C Buchanan (Slovenia) B Rola	6	6
(United States) M Krueger (United States) E Quigley	1	6	[10]
(United States) P Kobelt (United States) C Smith	6	4	[8]

Final
(United States) C Buchanan (Slovenia) B Rola	6	4	[19]
(United States) M Krueger (United States) E Quigley	4	6	[17]
