= 2016 Columbus Challenger 1 =

2016 Columbus Challenger
- Date: 19–25 September
- Edition: 2nd
- Draw: 32S / 16D
- Prize money: $50,000
- Surface: Hard / Indoors
- Location: Columbus, United States

Champions

Singles
- (Denmark) Mikael Torpegaard

Doubles
- (Latvia) Miķelis Lībietis / (United States) Dennis Novikov
← 2015 ·	Columbus Challenger	· 2016 →

The 2016 Columbus Challenger 1 was a professional tennis tournament played on indoor hard courts. It was the second edition of the tournament which was part of the 2016 ATP Challenger Tour. It took place in Columbus, United States between 19 and 25 September 2016.

== Singles main draw entrants ==
=== Seeds ===
Country	Player	Rank^{1}	Seed
GER	Benjamin Becker	99	1
USA	Dennis Novikov	126	2
USA	Austin Krajicek	151	3
CAN	Peter Polansky	159	4
USA	Ernesto Escobedo	175	5
ESA	Marcelo Arévalo	178	6
SLO	Blaž Rola	189	7
BRA	Guilherme Clezar	192	8

- ^{1} Rankings are as of September 12, 2016.

=== Other entrants ===
The following players received entry into the singles main draw as wildcards:

- (United States) J. J. Wolf
- (United States) John McNally
- (United States) Martin Joyce
- (Denmark) Mikael Torpegaard

The following player received entry into the singles main draw as an alternate:

- (El Salvador) Marcelo Arévalo

The following players received entry from the qualifying draw:

- (United States) Jared Hiltzik
- (Ecuador) Roberto Quiroz
- (Latvia) Miķelis Lībietis
- (United States) Gonzales Austin

== Champions ==
=== Singles ===
- (Denmark) Mikael Torpegaard def. (Germany) Benjamin Becker, 6–4, 1–6^{(7–2)}, 6–2.

=== Doubles ===
- (Latvia) Miķelis Lībietis / (United States) Dennis Novikov def. (Canada) Philip Bester / (Canada) Peter Polansky, 7–5, 7–6^{(7–4)}.
