= 2022 Estoril Open =

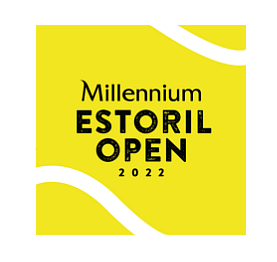
- Date: 25 April – 1 May
- Edition: 7th
- Category: ATP Tour 250
- Draw: 28S / 16D
- Prize money: €534,555
- Surface: Clay / outdoor
- Location: Cascais, Portugal
- Venue: Clube de Ténis do Estoril

Champions

Singles
- (Argentina) Sebastián Báez

Doubles
- (Portugal) Nuno Borges / (Portugal) Francisco Cabral
← 2021 ·	Estoril Open	· 2023 →

The 2022 Estoril Open was a men's tennis tournament played on outdoor clay courts. It was the 7th edition of the tournament and part of the ATP Tour 250 series of the 2022 ATP Tour. It took place at the Clube de Ténis do Estoril in Cascais, Portugal, from 25 April through 1 May 2022.

== Champions ==
=== Singles ===
- (Argentina) Sebastián Báez def. (United States) Frances Tiafoe, 6–3, 6–2

=== Doubles ===
- (Portugal) Nuno Borges / (Portugal) Francisco Cabral def. (Argentina) Máximo González / (Sweden) André Göransson, 6–2, 6–3

== Points and prize money ==
=== Point distribution ===
Event	W	F	SF	QF	Round of 16	Round of 32	Q	Q2	Q1
Singles	250	150	90	45	20	0	12	6	0
Doubles	250	150	90	45	0	—	—	—	—

=== Prize money ===
Event	W	F	SF	QF	Round of 16	Round of 32	Q2	Q1
Singles	€81,310	€47,430	€27,885	€16,160	€9,380	€5,730	€2,645	€1,375
Doubles*	€28,250	€15,110	€8,860	€4,950	€2,920	—	—	—

_{*per team}

== Singles main draw entrants ==
=== Seeds ===
Country	Player	Rank^{1}	Seed
CAN	Félix Auger-Aliassime	9	1
~~ARG~~	~~Diego Schwartzman~~	~~15~~	~~2~~
CRO	Marin Čilić	22	3
ESP	Alejandro Davidovich Fokina	27	4
USA	Frances Tiafoe	29	5
ESP	Albert Ramos Viñolas	32	6
USA	Tommy Paul	35	7
USA	Sebastian Korda	37	8

- ^{1} Rankings are as of 18 April 2022

=== Other entrants ===
The following players received wildcards into the main draw:

- (Portugal) Nuno Borges
- (Portugal) João Sousa
- (Austria) Dominic Thiem

The following players received entry from the qualifying draw:

- (Uruguay) Pablo Cuevas
- (Bolivia) Hugo Dellien
- (France) Pierre-Hugues Herbert
- (Spain) Bernabé Zapata Miralles

The following players received entry as lucky losers:

- (Spain) Carlos Taberner
- (Spain) Fernando Verdasco

=== Withdrawals ===
Before the tournament

- (Spain) Pablo Carreño Busta → replaced by (France) Richard Gasquet
- (Serbia) Laslo Đere → replaced by (Spain) Pablo Andújar
- (Spain) Pedro Martínez → replaced by (Czech Republic) Jiří Veselý
- (United Kingdom) Cameron Norrie → replaced by (Spain) Carlos Taberner
- (France) Arthur Rinderknech → replaced by (Argentina) Sebastián Báez
- (Argentina) Diego Schwartzman → replaced by (Spain) Fernando Verdasco

== Doubles main draw entrants ==
=== Seeds ===
Country	Player	Country	Player	Rank^{1}	Seed
GBR	Jamie Murray	NZL	Michael Venus	31	1
AUS	Matthew Ebden	AUS	Max Purcell	59	2
CRO	Ivan Dodig	USA	Austin Krajicek	64	3
RSA	Raven Klaasen	JPN	Ben McLachlan	87	4

- Rankings are as of 18 April 2022

=== Other entrants ===
The following pairs received wildcards into the doubles main draw:

- (Portugal) Nuno Borges / (Portugal) Francisco Cabral
- (Uruguay) Pablo Cuevas / (Portugal) João Sousa

=== Withdrawals ===
Before the tournament

- (El Salvador) Marcelo Arévalo / (Netherlands) Jean-Julien Rojer → replaced by (United Kingdom) Jonny O'Mara / (United Kingdom) Ken Skupski
- (Argentina) Federico Coria / (Spain) Pedro Martínez → replaced by (Argentina) Federico Coria / (France) Benoît Paire
- (Argentina) Máximo González / (Brazil) Marcelo Melo → replaced by (Argentina) Máximo González / (Sweden) André Göransson
- (Argentina) Andrés Molteni / (Italy) Andrea Vavassori → replaced by (United States) Nathaniel Lammons / (United States) Tommy Paul
- (United Kingdom) Jamie Murray / (France) Édouard Roger-Vasselin → replaced by (United Kingdom) Jamie Murray / (New Zealand) Michael Venus
