= 2015 Columbus Challenger =

- Date: 21–27 September
- Edition: 1st
- Draw: 32S / 16D
- Prize money: $50,000
- Surface: Hard / Indoors
- Location: Columbus, United States

Champions

Singles
- (United States) Dennis Novikov

Doubles
- (United States) Chase Buchanan / (Slovenia) Blaž Rola
Columbus Challenger	· 2016 →

The 2015 Columbus Challenger was a professional tennis tournament played on indoor hard courts. It was the first edition of the tournament which was part of the 2015 ATP Challenger Tour. It took place in Columbus, United States between 21 and 27 September 2015.

== Singles main draw entrants ==
=== Seeds ===
Country	Player	Rank^{1}	Seed
USA	Tim Smyczek	107	1
AUS	John-Patrick Smith	111	2
USA	Bjorn Fratangelo	118	3
USA	Ryan Harrison	129	4
USA	Austin Krajicek	130	5
SLO	Blaž Rola	139	6
GBR	Brydan Klein	178	7
USA	Dennis Novikov	208	8

- ^{1} Rankings are as of September 14, 2015.

=== Other entrants ===
No Wild Cards were distributed for this event.

The following players received entry into the singles main draw courtesy of a protected ranking:

- (United States) Dennis Nevolo
- (Canada) Peter Polansky

The following players received entry from the qualifying draw:

- (Canada) Hugo Di Feo
- (South Africa) Damon Gooch
- (United States) Peter Kobelt
- (South Africa) Dean O'Brien

== Champions ==
=== Singles ===
- (United States) Dennis Novikov def. (United States) Ryan Harrison, 6–3, 3–6, 6–3

=== Doubles ===
- (United States) Chase Buchanan / (Slovenia) Blaž Rola def. (United States) Mitchell Krueger / (United States) Eric Quigley, 6–4, 4–6, [19–17]
