= 2019 Estoril Open =

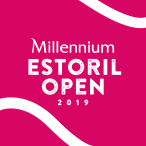
- Date: 29 April – 5 May
- Edition: 5th
- Draw: 28S / 16D
- Prize money: €586,140 (2019)
- Surface: Clay
- Location: Cascais, Portugal
- Venue: Clube de Ténis do Estoril

Champions

Singles
- (Greece) Stefanos Tsitsipas

Doubles
- (France) Jérémy Chardy / (France) Fabrice Martin
- Estoril Open (tennis)

The 2019 Estoril Open (also known as the Millennium Estoril Open for sponsorship purposes) was a professional men's tennis tournament played on outdoor clay courts. It was the fifth edition of the Estoril Open, and part of the ATP Tour 250 series of the 2019 ATP Tour. The event took place at the Clube de Ténis do Estoril in Cascais, Portugal, from April 29 through May 5, 2019.

== Singles main-draw entrants ==
=== Seeds ===
Country	Player	Rank^{1}	Seed
GRE	Stefanos Tsitsipas	8	1
ITA	~~Fabio Fognini~~	~~12~~	~~2~~
FRA	Gaël Monfils	19	3
BEL	David Goffin	22	4
SRB	Dušan Lajović	24	5
AUS	Alex de Minaur	26	6
ESP	Pablo Carreño Busta	29	7
USA	Frances Tiafoe	30	8

- Rankings are as of April 22, 2019.

=== Other entrants ===
The following players received wildcards into the singles main draw:

- (Spain) Pablo Carreño Busta
- (Belgium) David Goffin
- (Portugal) Pedro Sousa

The following player received entry as a special exempt:

- ~~(Serbia) Filip Krajinović~~

The following players received entry from the qualifying draw:

- (Italy) Salvatore Caruso
- (Spain) Alejandro Davidovich Fokina
- (Portugal) João Domingues
- (Australia) Alexei Popyrin

The following players received entry as lucky losers:

- (Italy) Filippo Baldi
- (Uruguay) Pablo Cuevas

=== Withdrawals ===
- (South Africa) Kevin Anderson → replaced by (Bolivia) Hugo Dellien
- (Serbia) Filip Krajinović → replaced by (Uruguay) Pablo Cuevas
- (Italy) Fabio Fognini → replaced by (Italy) Filippo Baldi
- (Spain) Jaume Munar → replaced by (Chile) Nicolás Jarry
- (United Kingdom) Cameron Norrie → replaced by (Argentina) Guido Andreozzi

=== Retirements ===
- (Australia) John Millman

== Doubles main-draw entrants ==
=== Seeds ===
Country	Player	Country	Player	Rank^{1}	Seed
USA	Rajeev Ram	GBR	Joe Salisbury	41	1
JPN	Ben McLachlan	NED	Matwé Middelkoop	69	2
ARG	Leonardo Mayer	POR	João Sousa	90	3
NZL	Marcus Daniell	NED	Wesley Koolhof	95	4

- Rankings are as of April 22, 2019.

=== Other entrants ===
The following pairs received wildcards into the doubles main draw:

- (Portugal) João Domingues / (Spain) Pedro Martínez
- ~~(Portugal) Gastão Elias / (Portugal) Pedro Sousa~~

The following pairs received entry as alternates:

- (Argentina) Guido Andreozzi / (Bolivia) Hugo Dellien
- (Portugal) Tiago Cação / (Portugal) Fred Gil

=== Withdrawals ===
Before the tournament

- (Australia) John Millman (Left foot injury)
- (Portugal) Pedro Sousa (Left foot injury)

During the tournament

- (United States) Reilly Opelka (Back pain)

== Champions ==
=== Singles ===
- (Greece) Stefanos Tsitsipas def. (Uruguay) Pablo Cuevas, 6–3, 7–6^{(7–4)}

=== Doubles ===
- (France) Jérémy Chardy / (France) Fabrice Martin def. (United Kingdom) Luke Bambridge / (United Kingdom) Jonny O'Mara, 7–5, 7–6^{(7–3)}
