= 2019 Estoril Open – Doubles =

Doubles
- 2019 Estoril Open

Final
- Champions: (France) Jérémy Chardy (France) Fabrice Martin
- Runners-up: (United Kingdom) Luke Bambridge (United Kingdom) Jonny O'Mara
- Score: 7–5, 7–6^{(7–3)}

Events
Singles	Doubles
← 2018 ·	Estoril Open	· 2021 →

Kyle Edmund and Cameron Norrie were the defending champions, but chose not to participate this year.

Jérémy Chardy and Fabrice Martin won the title, defeating Luke Bambridge and Jonny O'Mara in the final, 7–5, 7–6^{(7–3)}.

== Seeds ==
1. (United States) Rajeev Ram / (United Kingdom) Joe Salisbury (first round)
2. (Japan) Ben McLachlan / (Netherlands) Matwé Middelkoop (first round)
3. (Argentina) Leonardo Mayer / (Portugal) João Sousa (quarterfinals)
4. (New Zealand) Marcus Daniell / (Netherlands) Wesley Koolhof (semifinals)

== Draw ==
=== Key ===
- Q = Qualifier
- WC = Wild card
- LL = Lucky loser
- Alt = Alternate
- SE = Special exempt
- PR = Protected ranking
- ITF = ITF entry
- JE = Junior exempt
- w/o = Walkover
- r = Retired
- d = Defaulted
- SR = Special ranking

=== Draw ===
First round
1	(United States) R Ram (United Kingdom) J Salisbury	6	5	[7]
(Argentina) G Durán (Argentina) M González	3	7	[10]
(Italy) S Bolelli (Sweden) R Lindstedt	7^{7}	6^{3}	[7]
(France) J Chardy (France) F Martin	6^{4}	7^{7}	[10]
4	(New Zealand) M Daniell (Netherlands) W Koolhof	6	3	[10]
Alt	(Portugal) T Cação (Portugal) F Gil	3	6	[4]
WC	(Portugal) J Domingues (Spain) P Martínez	2	6	[6]
(Uruguay) P Cuevas (Netherlands) J-J Rojer	6	3	[10]
(United Kingdom) L Bambridge (United Kingdom) J O'Mara	5	6	[10]
PR	(Serbia) D Lajović (Serbia) N Zimonjić	7	0	[3]
(Mexico) S González (Pakistan) A-u-H Qureshi	4	4
3	(Argentina) L Mayer (Portugal) J Sousa	6	6
(Spain) G Granollers (Spain) M López	w/o
(United States) M McDonald (United States) R Opelka
Alt	(Argentina) G Andreozzi (Bolivia) H Dellien	6	6
2	(Japan) B McLachlan (Netherlands) M Middelkoop	3	4

Quarterfinals
(Argentina) G Durán (Argentina) M González	6	3	[7]
(France) J Chardy (France) F Martin	4	6	[10]
4	(New Zealand) M Daniell (Netherlands) W Koolhof	7^{10}	4	[10]
(Uruguay) P Cuevas (Netherlands) J-J Rojer	6^{8}	6	[7]
(United Kingdom) L Bambridge (United Kingdom) J O'Mara	6	6
3	(Argentina) L Mayer (Portugal) J Sousa	2	1
(Spain) G Granollers (Spain) M López	6	7
Alt	(Argentina) G Andreozzi (Bolivia) H Dellien	4	5

Semifinals
(France) J Chardy (France) F Martin	3	7^{7}	[10]
4	(New Zealand) M Daniell (Netherlands) W Koolhof	6	6^{5}	[8]
(United Kingdom) L Bambridge (United Kingdom) J O'Mara	6	7
(Spain) G Granollers (Spain) M López	4	5

Final
(France) J Chardy (France) F Martin	7	7^{7}
(United Kingdom) L Bambridge (United Kingdom) J O'Mara	5	6^{3}
