= 2017 Columbus Challenger – Doubles =

Doubles
- 2017 Columbus Challenger

Final
- Champions: (Germany) Dominik Köpfer (United States) Denis Kudla
- Runners-up: (United Kingdom) Luke Bambridge (Republic of Ireland) David O'Hare
- Score: 7–6^{(8–6)}, 7–6^{(7–3)}

Events
Singles	Doubles
- Columbus Challenger

David O'Hare and Joe Salisbury were the defending champions but chose to defend their title with different partners. O'Hare partnered Luke Bambridge but lost in the final to Dominik Köpfer and Denis Kudla. Salisbury partnered Brydan Klein but lost in the semifinals to Bambridge and O'Hare.

Köpfer and Kudla won the title after defeating Bambridge and O'Hare 7–6^{(8–6)}, 7–6^{(7–3)} in the final.

== Seeds ==
1. (United States) Austin Krajicek / (United States) Jackson Withrow (quarterfinals)
2. (United Kingdom) Brydan Klein / (United Kingdom) Joe Salisbury (semifinals)
3. (United Kingdom) Luke Bambridge / (Republic of Ireland) David O'Hare (final)
4. (United States) Sekou Bangoura / (United States) Evan King (semifinals)

== Draw ==
Key

- Q = Qualifier
- WC = Wild card
- LL = Lucky loser
- Alt = Alternate
- ITF = ITF entry
- PR = Protected ranking
- SR = Special ranking
- SE = Special exempt
- JE = Junior exempt
- JR = Junior Accelerator Programme entrant
- CO = College Accelerator Programme entrant
- NG = Next Gen Accelerator Program entrant
- w/o = Walkover
- r = Retired
- d = Defaulted

First round
1	(United States) A Krajicek (United States) J Withrow	6	6
(United States) M McDonald (Ecuador) R Quiroz	3	4
(Germany) D Köpfer (United States) D Kudla	7^{9}	6
WC	(United States) J McNally (United States) J. J. Wolf	6^{7}	1
4	(United States) S Bangoura (United States) E King	7	6
WC	(United States) Alex Kobelt (United States) Hunter Tubert	5	4
(Colombia) DE Galán (Mexico) L Patiño	6	3	[10]
WC	(United States) Martin Joyce (Denmark) M Torpegaard	3	6	[12]
(Canada) F Dancevic (Croatia) A Pavić	6	6
(United States) K King (South Africa) R Roelofse	3	4
(United States) Andrew Carter (United States) N Chappell	6	1	[4]
3	(United Kingdom) L Bambridge (Republic of Ireland) D O'Hare	4	6	[10]
(Latvia) M Lībietis (United States) D Novikov	7^{12}	6
(Mexico) H Hach Verdugo (Canada) B Schnur	6^{10}	3
(India) P Gunneswaran (India) R Ramanathan	5	5
2	(United Kingdom) B Klein (United Kingdom) J Salisbury	7	7

Quarterfinals
1	(United States) A Krajicek (United States) J Withrow	2	6^{6}
(Germany) D Köpfer (United States) D Kudla	6	7^{8}
4	(United States) S Bangoura (United States) E King	7	6
WC	(United States) M Joyce (Denmark) M Torpegaard	5	4
(Canada) F Dancevic (Croatia) A Pavić	7^{7}	1	[4]
3	(United Kingdom) L Bambridge (Republic of Ireland) D O'Hare	6^{5}	6	[10]
(Latvia) M Lībietis (United States) D Novikov	4	6	[11]
2	(United Kingdom) B Klein (United Kingdom) J Salisbury	6	1	[13]

Semifinals
(Germany) D Köpfer (United States) D Kudla	7^{7}	7^{7}
4	(United States) S Bangoura (United States) E King	6^{4}	6^{4}
3	(United Kingdom) L Bambridge (Republic of Ireland) D O'Hare	6	6
2	(United Kingdom) B Klein (United Kingdom) J Salisbury	3	4

Final
(Germany) D Köpfer (United States) D Kudla	7^{8}	7^{7}
3	(United Kingdom) L Bambridge (Republic of Ireland) D O'Hare	6^{6}	6^{3}
