= 2021 Estoril Open – Doubles =

Doubles
- 2021 Estoril Open

Final
- Champions: (Monaco) Hugo Nys (Germany) Tim Pütz
- Runners-up: (United Kingdom) Luke Bambridge (United Kingdom) Dominic Inglot
- Score: 7–5, 3–6, [10–3]

Events
Singles	Doubles
- Estoril Open

Hugo Nys and Tim Pütz defeated Luke Bambridge and Dominic Inglot in the final, 7–5, 3–6, [10–3], to win the doubles tennis title at the 2021 Estoril Open. It was Nys and Pütz's first title as a team in their second tournament together on the ATP Tour, marking Nys's second and Pütz's third individual career tour-level doubles titles. Bambridge and Inglot were in contention for their first title as a team after reaching their first tour-level final without dropping a set.

Jérémy Chardy and Fabrice Martin were the defending champions from when the tournament was last held in 2019, but Chardy did not return to compete. Martin played alongside Édouard Roger-Vasselin but lost in the first round to Cristian Garín and David Vega Hernández.

== Seeds ==
1. (France) Fabrice Martin / (France) Édouard Roger-Vasselin (first round)
2. (South Africa) Raven Klaasen / (Japan) Ben McLachlan (semifinals)
3. (United States) Austin Krajicek / (Austria) Oliver Marach (quarterfinals)
4. (El Salvador) Marcelo Arévalo / (Netherlands) Matwé Middelkoop (first round)

== Draw ==
Key

- Q = Qualifier
- WC = Wild card
- LL = Lucky loser
- Alt = Alternate
- ITF = ITF entry
- PR = Protected ranking
- SR = Special ranking
- SE = Special exempt
- JE = Junior exempt
- JR = Junior Accelerator Programme entrant
- CO = College Accelerator Programme entrant
- NG = Next Gen Accelerator Program entrant
- w/o = Walkover
- r = Retired
- d = Defaulted

=== Draw ===
First round
1	(France) F Martin (France) É Roger-Vasselin	2	7^{7}	[5]
(Chile) C Garín (Spain) D Vega Hernández	6	6^{5}	[10]
(Argentina) A Molteni (Denmark) F Nielsen	1	4
(Uruguay) A Behar (Ecuador) G Escobar	6	6
3	(United States) A Krajicek (Austria) O Marach	6^{4}	6	[11]
WC	(United Kingdom) C Norrie (Portugal) J Sousa	7^{7}	4	[9]
(United Kingdom) L Bambridge (United Kingdom) D Inglot	6	7^{7}
(India) R Bopanna (Kazakhstan) A Bublik	2	6^{1}
(Monaco) H Nys (Germany) T Pütz	6	6
(United Kingdom) L Glasspool (United Kingdom) J Murray	3	3
(Brazil) M Demoliner (Mexico) S González	6	3	[10]
4	(El Salvador) M Arévalo (Netherlands) M Middelkoop	2	6	[5]
WC	(Portugal) F Ferreira Silva (Portugal) P Sousa	4	2
(United States) N Monroe (United States) F Tiafoe	6	6
(Italy) S Bolelli (Argentina) M González	2	3
2	(South Africa) R Klaasen (Japan) B McLachlan	6	6

Quarterfinals
(Chile) C Garín (Spain) D Vega Hernández	4	4
(Uruguay) A Behar (Ecuador) G Escobar	6	6
3	(United States) A Krajicek (Austria) O Marach	6^{2}	4
(United Kingdom) L Bambridge (United Kingdom) D Inglot	7^{7}	6
(Monaco) H Nys (Germany) T Pütz	7^{7}	6
(Brazil) M Demoliner (Mexico) S González	6^{3}	1
(United States) N Monroe (United States) F Tiafoe	3	7^{7}	[6]
2	(South Africa) R Klaasen (Japan) B McLachlan	6	6^{4}	[10]

Semifinals
(Uruguay) A Behar (Ecuador) G Escobar	3	4
(United Kingdom) L Bambridge (United Kingdom) D Inglot	6	6
(Monaco) H Nys (Germany) T Pütz	3	6	[14]
2	(South Africa) R Klaasen (Japan) B McLachlan	6	4	[12]

Final
(United Kingdom) L Bambridge (United Kingdom) D Inglot	5	6	[3]
(Monaco) H Nys (Germany) T Pütz	7	3	[10]
