= 2021 Estoril Open =

ATP tennis tournament

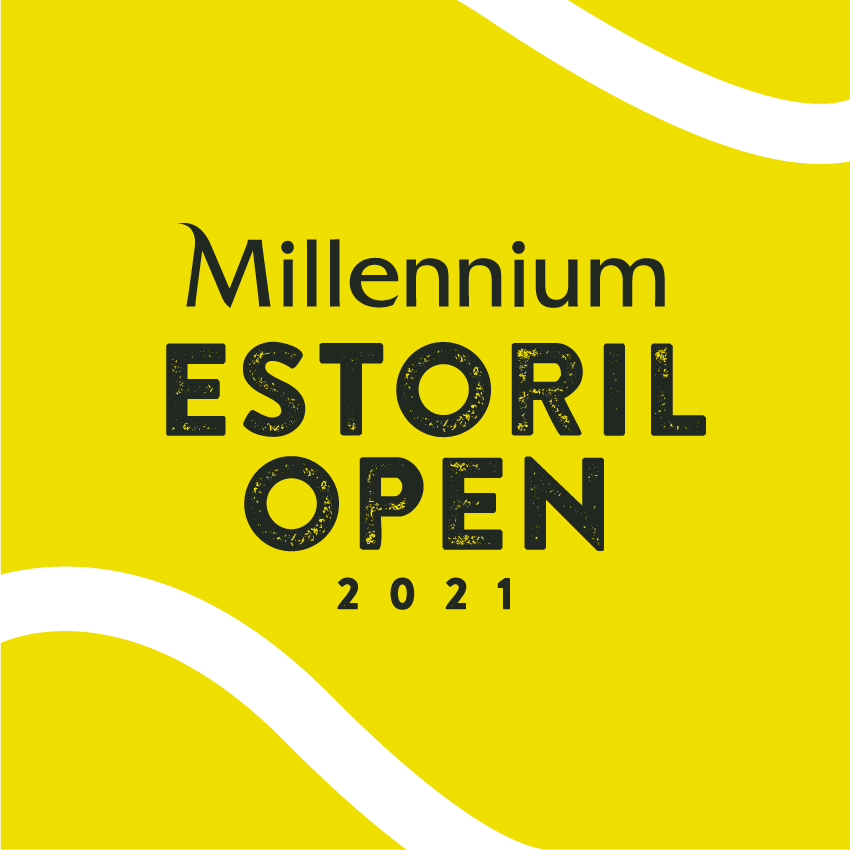
- Date: 26 April – 2 May
- Edition: 6th
- Category: ATP Tour 250
- Draw: 28S / 16D
- Prize money: €481,270
- Surface: Clay / outdoor
- Location: Cascais, Portugal
- Venue: Clube de Ténis do Estoril

Champions

Singles
- (Spain) Albert Ramos Viñolas

Doubles
- (Monaco) Hugo Nys / (Germany) Tim Pütz
- Estoril Open

The 2021 Estoril Open is a men's tennis tournament played on outdoor clay courts. It is the 6th edition of the tournament and part of the ATP Tour 250 series of the 2021 ATP Tour. It tames place at the Clube de Ténis do Estoril in Cascais, Portugal, from 26 April through 2 May 2021. Seventh-seeded Albert Ramos Viñolas won the singles title.

== Champions ==
=== Singles ===
- (Spain) Albert Ramos Viñolas def. (United Kingdom) Cameron Norrie, 4–6, 6–3, 7–6^{(7–3)}.

=== Doubles ===
- (Monaco) Hugo Nys / (Germany) Tim Pütz def. (United Kingdom) Luke Bambridge / (United Kingdom) Dominic Inglot, 7–5, 3–6, [10–3].

== Points and prize money ==
=== Point distribution ===
| Event | W | F | SF | QF | Round of 16 | Round of 32 | Q | Q2 | Q1 |
| Singles | 250 | 150 | 90 | 45 | 20 | 0 | 12 | 6 | 0 |
| Doubles | 250 | 150 | 90 | 45 | 0 | —N/a | —N/a | —N/a | —N/a |

=== Prize money ===
| Event | W | F | SF | QF | Round of 16 | Round of 32 | Q2 | Q1 |
| Singles | €41,145 | €29,500 | €21,000 | €14,000 | €9,000 | €5,415 | €2,645 | €1,375 |
| Doubles* | €15,360 | €11,000 | €7,250 | €4,710 | €2,760 | —N/a | —N/a | —N/a |

_{*per team}

== Singles main-draw entrants ==
=== Seeds ===
| Country | Player | Rank^{1} | Seed |
|---|---|---|---|
| CAN | Denis Shapovalov | 14 | 1 |
| CHI | Cristian Garín | 22 | 2 |
| FRA | Ugo Humbert | 31 | 3 |
| ~~JPN~~ | ~~Kei Nishikori~~ | ~~39~~ | ~~4~~ |
| KAZ | Alexander Bublik | 42 | 5 |
| CRO | Marin Čilić | 44 | 6 |
| ESP | Albert Ramos Viñolas | 46 | 7 |
| ESP | Alejandro Davidovich Fokina | 48 | 8 |

- ^{1} Rankings are as of 19 April 2021

=== Other entrants ===
The following players received wildcards into the main draw:

- ~~(Japan) Kei Nishikori~~
- (Canada) Denis Shapovalov
- (Portugal) João Sousa

The following players received entry from the qualifying draw:

- (Spain) Carlos Alcaraz
- (Portugal) Nuno Borges
- (Spain) Pedro Martínez
- (Spain) Jaume Munar

The following player received entry as a lucky loser:

- (Spain) Roberto Carballés Baena

=== Withdrawals ===
Before the tournament

- (Spain) Pablo Carreño Busta → replaced by (South Africa) Kevin Anderson
- (Italy) Fabio Fognini → replaced by (France) Pierre-Hugues Herbert
- (France) Gaël Monfils → replaced by (Italy) Marco Cecchinato
- (Japan) Kei Nishikori → replaced by (Spain) Roberto Carballés Baena
- (France) Benoît Paire → replaced by (Spain) Fernando Verdasco
- (Argentina) Diego Schwartzman → replaced by (Argentina) Juan Ignacio Londero

During the tournament

- (France) Richard Gasquet

=== Retirements ===
- (South Africa) Kevin Anderson

== Doubles main-draw entrants ==
=== Seeds ===
| Country | Player | Country | Player | Rank^{1} | Seed |
|---|---|---|---|---|---|
| FRA | Fabrice Martin | FRA | Édouard Roger-Vasselin | 40 | 1 |
| RSA | Raven Klaasen | JPN | Ben McLachlan | 67 | 2 |
| USA | Austin Krajicek | AUT | Oliver Marach | 70 | 3 |
| ESA | Marcelo Arévalo | NED | Matwé Middelkoop | 93 | 4 |

- Rankings are as of 19 April 2021

=== Other entrants ===
The following pairs received wildcards into the doubles main draw:

- (Portugal) Frederico Ferreira Silva / (Portugal) Pedro Sousa
- (United Kingdom) Cameron Norrie / (Portugal) João Sousa

=== Withdrawals ===
Before the tournament

- (Monaco) Romain Arneodo / (France) Benoît Paire → replaced by (United States) Nicholas Monroe / (United States) Frances Tiafoe
- (Spain) Marcel Granollers / (Argentina) Horacio Zeballos → replaced by (Chile) Cristian Garín / (Spain) David Vega Hernández
