= 2022 Estoril Open – Doubles =

Doubles
- 2022 Estoril Open

Final
- Champions: (Portugal) Nuno Borges (Portugal) Francisco Cabral
- Runners-up: (Argentina) Máximo González (Sweden) André Göransson
- Score: 6–2, 6–3

Events
Singles	Doubles
- Estoril Open

Nuno Borges and Francisco Cabral defeated Máximo González and André Göransson in the final, 6–2, 6–3 to win the doubles tennis title at the 2022 Estoril Open. Borges and Cabral had entered the tournament through a wildcard.

Hugo Nys and Tim Pütz were the defending champions, but only Nys chose to play, partnering Jan Zieliński; they lost in the first round to Raven Klaasen and Ben McLachlan.

== Seeds ==
1. (United Kingdom) Jamie Murray / (New Zealand) Michael Venus (semifinals)
2. (Australia) Matthew Ebden / (Australia) Max Purcell (first round)
3. (Croatia) Ivan Dodig / (United States) Austin Krajicek (first round)
4. (South Africa) Raven Klaasen / (Japan) Ben McLachlan (semifinals)

== Draw ==
Key

- Q = Qualifier
- WC = Wild card
- LL = Lucky loser
- Alt = Alternate
- ITF = ITF entry
- PR = Protected ranking
- SR = Special ranking
- SE = Special exempt
- JE = Junior exempt
- JR = Junior Accelerator Programme entrant
- CO = College Accelerator Programme entrant
- NG = Next Gen Accelerator Program entrant
- w/o = Walkover
- r = Retired
- d = Defaulted

=== Draw ===
First round
1	(United Kingdom) J Murray (New Zealand) M Venus	7	2	[10]
(Netherlands) R Haase (Poland) Ł Kubot	5	6	[5]
(Kazakhstan) A Nedovyesov (Pakistan) A-u-H Qureshi	6	3	[10]
(Bosnia and Herzegovina) T Brkić (Serbia) N Ćaćić	2	6	[4]
3	(Croatia) I Dodig (United States) A Krajicek	4	6	[5]
WC	(Portugal) N Borges (Portugal) F Cabral	6	3	[10]
(United States) N Lammons (United States) T Paul	6	7
(United Kingdom) J O'Mara (United Kingdom) K Skupski	3	5
(Israel) J Erlich (South Africa) L Harris	3	6	[10]
(Uruguay) A Behar (Ecuador) G Escobar	6	2	8
(Monaco) H Nys (Poland) J Zieliński	4	6^{4}
4	(South Africa) R Klaasen (Japan) B McLachlan	6	7^{7}
(Argentina) M González (Sweden) A Göransson	4	6	[10]
(Argentina) F Coria (France) B Paire	6	4	[8]
WC	(Uruguay) P Cuevas (Portugal) J Sousa	6	6
2	(Australia) M Ebden (Australia) M Purcell	4	3

Quarterfinals
1	(United Kingdom) J Murray (New Zealand) M Venus	6	6
(Kazakhstan) A Nedovyesov (Pakistan) A-u-H Qureshi	4	4
WC	(Portugal) N Borges (Portugal) F Cabral	6	6^{2}	[10]
(United States) N Lammons (United States) T Paul	3	7^{7}	[6]
(Israel) J Erlich (South Africa) L Harris	6	1	[4]
4	(South Africa) R Klaasen (Japan) B McLachlan	4	6	[10]
(Argentina) M González (Sweden) A Göransson	7^{7}	7
WC	(Uruguay) P Cuevas (Portugal) J Sousa	6^{3}	5

Semifinals
1	(United Kingdom) J Murray (New Zealand) M Venus	2	4
WC	(Portugal) N Borges (Portugal) F Cabral	6	6
4	(South Africa) R Klaasen (Japan) B McLachlan	6	6^{7}	[6]
(Argentina) M González (Sweden) A Göransson	2	7^{9}	[10]

Final
WC	(Portugal) N Borges (Portugal) F Cabral	6	6
(Argentina) M González (Sweden) A Göransson	2	3
