= 2021 Estoril Open – Singles =

Singles
- 2021 Estoril Open

Final
- Champion: (Spain) Albert Ramos Viñolas
- Runner-up: (United Kingdom) Cameron Norrie
- Score: 4–6, 6–3, 7–6^{(7–3)}

Details
- Draw: 28 (4 Q / 3 WC )
- Seeds: 8

Events
Singles	Doubles
← 2019 ·	Estoril Open	· 2022 →

Albert Ramos Viñolas defeated Cameron Norrie in the final, 4–6, 6–3, 7–6^{(7–3)} to win the singles tennis title at the 2021 Estoril Open. It marked his third career ATP Tour singles title, all of which have been on clay. Norrie was aiming to win his first ATP Tour title in his second final.

Stefanos Tsitsipas was the defending champion from when the tournament was last held in 2019, but did not return to compete.

== Seeds ==
The top four seeds received a bye into the second round.

1. (Canada) Denis Shapovalov (second round)
2. (Chile) Cristian Garín (quarterfinals)
3. (France) Ugo Humbert (quarterfinals)
4. (Japan) Kei Nishikori (withdrew)
5. (Kazakhstan) Alexander Bublik (first round)
6. (Croatia) Marin Čilić (semifinals)
7. (Spain) Albert Ramos Viñolas (champion)
8. (Spain) Alejandro Davidovich Fokina (semifinals)

== Draw ==
=== Key ===
- Q = Qualifier
- WC = Wild card
- LL = Lucky loser
- Alt = Alternate
- SE = Special exempt
- PR = Protected ranking
- ITF = ITF entry
- JE = Junior exempt
- w/o = Walkover
- r = Retired
- d = Defaulted
- SR = Special ranking

=== Finals ===
Semifinals
7	(Spain) Albert Ramos Viñolas	6	6
8	(Spain) Alejandro Davidovich Fokina	1	4
6	(Croatia) Marin Čilić	6^{5}	5
(United Kingdom) Cameron Norrie	7^{7}	7

Final
7	(Spain) Albert Ramos Viñolas	4	6	7^{7}
(United Kingdom) Cameron Norrie	6	3	6^{3}

=== Top half ===
First round
(United States) M Giron	4	7^{9}	4
(France) C Moutet	6	6^{7}	6
(France) G Simon	5	3
(France) P-H Herbert	7	6
(Spain) F Verdasco	3	3
7	(Spain) A Ramos Viñolas	6	6
(Italy) M Cecchinato	6	6
(South Africa) L Harris	3	4
(France) J Chardy	3	6	6
Q	(Spain) J Munar	6	3	4
(Spain) P Andújar	3	6	1
8	(Spain) A Davidovich Fokina	6	4	6

Second round
1/WC	(Canada) D Shapovalov	4	6	4
(France) C Moutet	6	2	6
(France) P-H Herbert	2	6^{3}
7	(Spain) A Ramos Viñolas	6	7^{7}
3	(France) U Humbert	6	3	6
(Italy) M Cecchinato	4	6	3
(France) J Chardy	1	2
8	(Spain) A Davidovich Fokina	6	6

Quarterfinals
(France) C Moutet	4	3
7	(Spain) A Ramos Viñolas	6	6
3	(France) U Humbert	4	4
8	(Spain) A Davidovich Fokina	6	6

Semifinals
7	(Spain) A Ramos Viñolas	6	6
8	(Spain) A Davidovich Fokina	1	4

=== Bottom half ===
First round
6	(Croatia) M Čilić	6	1	6
Q	(Spain) C Alcaraz	3	6	4
Q	(Portugal) N Borges	7^{7}	6
(Australia) J Thompson	6^{5}	3
(South Africa) K Anderson	4	7^{8}	7^{7}
(United States) F Tiafoe	6	6^{6}	6^{4}
5	(Kazakhstan) A Bublik	3	0
Q	(Spain) P Martínez	6	6
(United Kingdom) C Norrie	6	6
WC	(Portugal) J Sousa	1	3
(Argentina) JI Londero	3	5
(France) R Gasquet	6	7

Second round
6	(Croatia) M Čilić	6^{5}	6	6
Q	(Portugal) N Borges	7^{7}	4	4
(South Africa) K Anderson	6	7^{7}
LL	(Spain) R Carballés Baena	3	6^{4}
Q	(Spain) P Martínez	6	6^{1}	5
(United Kingdom) C Norrie	4	7^{7}	7
(France) R Gasquet
2	(Chile) C Garín	w/o

Quarterfinals
6	(Croatia) M Čilić	7^{9}	0
(South Africa) K Anderson	6^{7}	0^{r}
(United Kingdom) C Norrie	3	7	6
2	(Chile) C Garín	6	5	3

Semifinals
6	(Croatia) M Čilić	6^{5}	5
(United Kingdom) C Norrie	7^{7}	7

== Qualifying ==
=== Seeds ===
1. (Spain) Jaume Munar (qualified)
2. (Spain) Roberto Carballés Baena (qualifying competition, lucky loser)
3. (Argentina) Juan Ignacio Londero (moved to main draw)
4. (Spain) Pedro Martínez (qualified)
5. (Portugal) Pedro Sousa (first round)
6. (Spain) Carlos Alcaraz (qualified)
7. (United States) Brandon Nakashima (first round)
8. (United Kingdom) Liam Broady (first round)

=== Qualifiers ===
1. (Spain) Jaume Munar
2. (Portugal) Nuno Borges
3. (Spain) Carlos Alcaraz
4. (Spain) Pedro Martínez

=== Lucky loser ===
1. (Spain) Roberto Carballés Baena

=== Qualifying draw ===
==== First qualifier ====
First round
1	(Spain) Jaume Munar	6	7^{7}
(Italy) Thomas Fabbiano	4	6^{5}
WC	(Portugal) Frederico Ferreira Silva	6	6
7	(United States) Brandon Nakashima	2	3

Qualifying competition
1	(Spain) Jaume Munar	7^{8}	6
WC	(Portugal) Frederico Ferreira Silva	6^{6}	3

==== Second qualifier ====
First round
2	(Spain) Roberto Carballés Baena	7	7
(Switzerland) Henri Laaksonen	5	5
WC	(Portugal) Nuno Borges	6	7
8	(United Kingdom) Liam Broady	3	5

Qualifying competition
2	(Spain) Roberto Carballés Baena	5	4
WC	(Portugal) Nuno Borges	7	6

==== Third qualifier ====
First round
Alt	(Portugal) João Domingues	4	2
(Spain) Carlos Taberner	6	6
(Netherlands) Tallon Griekspoor	1	3
6	(Spain) Carlos Alcaraz	6	6

Qualifying competition
(Spain) Carlos Taberner	5	3
6	(Spain) Carlos Alcaraz	7	6

==== Fourth qualifier ====
First round
4	(Spain) Pedro Martínez	6	6^{4}	6
(Netherlands) Botic van de Zandschulp	4	7^{7}	1
(Switzerland) Marc-Andrea Hüsler	6	6
5	(Portugal) Pedro Sousa	2	4

Qualifying competition
4	(Spain) Pedro Martínez	7	7
(Switzerland) Marc-Andrea Hüsler	5	5
