= 2022 Estoril Open – Singles =

Singles
- 2022 Estoril Open

Final
- Champion: (Argentina) Sebastián Báez
- Runner-up: (United States) Frances Tiafoe
- Score: 6–3, 6–2

Details
- Draw: 28 (4 Q / 3 WC )
- Seeds: 8

Events
Singles	Doubles
← 2021 ·	Estoril Open	· 2023 →

Sebastián Báez defeated Frances Tiafoe in the final, 6–3, 6–2 to win the singles tennis title at the 2022 Estoril Open. It was his maiden ATP Tour title.

Albert Ramos Viñolas was the defending champion, but he lost in the semifinals to Báez.

== Seeds ==
The top four seeds received a bye into the second round.

1. (Canada) Félix Auger-Aliassime (quarterfinals)
2. (Argentina) Diego Schwartzman (withdrew)
3. (Croatia) Marin Čilić (second round)
4. (Spain) Alejandro Davidovich Fokina (quarterfinals)
5. (United States) Frances Tiafoe (final)
6. (Spain) Albert Ramos Viñolas (semifinals)
7. (United States) Tommy Paul (first round)
8. (United States) Sebastian Korda (semifinals)

== Draw ==
=== Key ===
- Q = Qualifier
- WC = Wild card
- LL = Lucky loser
- Alt = Alternate
- SE = Special exempt
- PR = Protected ranking
- ITF = ITF entry
- JE = Junior exempt
- w/o = Walkover
- r = Retired
- d = Defaulted
- SR = Special ranking

=== Finals ===
Semifinals
8	(United States) Sebastian Korda	6	6^{2}	4
5	(United States) Frances Tiafoe	4	7^{7}	6
(Argentina) Sebastián Báez	6	6^{7}	6
6	(Spain) Albert Ramos Viñolas	3	7^{9}	0

Final
5	(United States) Frances Tiafoe	3	2
(Argentina) Sebastián Báez	6	6

=== Top half ===
First round
(South Africa) L Harris	3	4
LL	(Spain) C Taberner	6	6
(France) B Bonzi	6	7^{11}
WC	(Austria) D Thiem	3	6^{9}
Q	(France) P-H Herbert	2	4
8	(United States) S Korda	6	6
(Argentina) F Coria	4	3
Q	(Spain) B Zapata Miralles	6	6
(Spain) P Andújar	4	0^{r}
WC	(Portugal) N Borges	6	3
(Serbia) D Lajović	6	5	0
5	(United States) F Tiafoe	2	7	6

Second round
1	(Canada) F Auger-Aliassime	1	6	6
LL	(Spain) C Taberner	6	2	2
(France) B Bonzi	3	3
8	(United States) S Korda	6	6
4	(Spain) A Davidovich Fokina	6	7^{7}
Q	(Spain) B Zapata Miralles	3	6^{5}
WC	(Portugal) N Borges	6^{4}	6	0
5	(United States) F Tiafoe	7^{7}	4	6

Quarterfinals
1	(Canada) F Auger-Aliassime	2	2
8	(United States) S Korda	6	6
4	(Spain) A Davidovich Fokina	6^{5}	7	5
5	(United States) F Tiafoe	7^{7}	5	7

Semifinals
8	(United States) S Korda	6	6^{2}	4
5	(United States) F Tiafoe	4	7^{7}	6

=== Bottom half ===
First round
7	(United States) T Paul	5	2
(France) R Gasquet	7	6
(Czech Republic) J Veselý	3	3
Q	(Bolivia) H Dellien	6	6
WC	(Portugal) J Sousa	1	3
(Argentina) S Báez	6	6
6	(Spain) A Ramos Viñolas	6	3	6
(Australia) J Thompson	4	6	4
(South Korea) S-w Kwon	6	7
(France) B Paire	4	5
Q	(Uruguay) P Cuevas	6	3	7^{7}
(Spain) R Carballés Baena	3	6	6^{4}

Second round
(France) R Gasquet	7^{7}	6
Q	(Bolivia) H Dellien	6^{5}	2
(Argentina) S Báez	1	6	6
3	(Croatia) M Čilić	6	1	4
6	(Spain) A Ramos Viñolas	5	6	6
(South Korea) S-w Kwon	7	1	2
Q	(Uruguay) P Cuevas	2	3
LL	(Spain) F Verdasco	6	6

Quarterfinals
(France) R Gasquet	6	1	4
(Argentina) S Báez	3	6	6
6	(Spain) A Ramos Viñolas	6	6
LL	(Spain) F Verdasco	2	2

Semifinals
(Argentina) S Báez	6	6^{7}	6
6	(Spain) A Ramos Viñolas	3	7^{9}	0

== Qualifying ==
=== Seeds ===
1. (Bolivia) Hugo Dellien (qualified)
2. (Spain) Carlos Taberner (qualifying competition, lucky loser)
3. (Uruguay) Pablo Cuevas (qualified)
4. (Australia) Alexei Popyrin (first round)
5. (Italy) Marco Cecchinato (first round)
6. (Italy) Gianluca Mager (first round, retired)
7. (Spain) Bernabé Zapata Miralles (qualified)
8. (Spain) Fernando Verdasco (qualifying competition, lucky loser)

=== Qualifiers ===
1. (Bolivia) Hugo Dellien
2. (Spain) Bernabé Zapata Miralles
3. (Uruguay) Pablo Cuevas
4. (France) Pierre-Hugues Herbert

=== Lucky losers ===
1. (Spain) Carlos Taberner
2. (Spain) Fernando Verdasco

=== Draw ===
==== First qualifier ====
First round
1	(Bolivia) Hugo Dellien	6	6
Alt	(Portugal) Gastão Elias	4	4
(Australia) Max Purcell	7^{7}	4	6
5	(Italy) Marco Cecchinato	6^{1}	6	3

Qualifying competition
1	(Bolivia) Hugo Dellien	6	6
(Australia) Max Purcell	1	2

==== Second qualifier ====
First round
2	(Spain) Carlos Taberner	6	6
WC	(Portugal) Tiago Cação	2	4
PR	(Portugal) Pedro Sousa	2	4
7	(Spain) Bernabé Zapata Miralles	6	6

Qualifying competition
2	(Spain) Carlos Taberner	1	3
7	(Spain) Bernabé Zapata Miralles	6	6

==== Third qualifier ====
First round
3	(Uruguay) Pablo Cuevas	6	7^{7}
(United Kingdom) Liam Broady	4	6^{5}
WC	(Portugal) Pedro Araújo	6	2
6	(Italy) Gianluca Mager	1	0^{r}

Qualifying competition
3	(Uruguay) Pablo Cuevas	6^{4}	6	6
WC	(Portugal) Pedro Araújo	7^{7}	3	1

==== Fourth qualifier ====
First round
4	(Australia) Alexei Popyrin	3	4
(France) Pierre-Hugues Herbert	6	6
(Moldova) Radu Albot	3	7^{7}	3
8	(Spain) Fernando Verdasco	6	6^{5}	6

Qualifying competition
(France) Pierre-Hugues Herbert	7	6^{4}	6
8	(Spain) Fernando Verdasco	5	7^{7}	2
