= 2019 Estoril Open – Singles =

Singles
- 2019 Estoril Open

Final
- Champion: (Greece) Stefanos Tsitsipas
- Runner-up: (Uruguay) Pablo Cuevas
- Score: 6–3, 7–6^{(7–4)}

Details
- Draw: 28 (4 Q / 3 WC )
- Seeds: 8

Events
Singles	Doubles
← 2018 ·	Estoril Open	· 2021 →

João Sousa was the defending champion, but lost in the second round to David Goffin.

Stefanos Tsitsipas won the title, defeating Pablo Cuevas in the final, 6–3, 7–6^{(7–4)}.

== Seeds ==
The top four seeds received a bye into the second round.

1. (Greece) Stefanos Tsitsipas (champion)
2. (Italy) Fabio Fognini (withdrew)
3. (France) Gaël Monfils (quarterfinals)
4. (Belgium) David Goffin (semifinals)
5. (Serbia) Dušan Lajović (first round)
6. (Australia) Alex de Minaur (first round)
7. (Spain) Pablo Carreño Busta (first round)
8. (United States) Frances Tiafoe (quarterfinals)

== Draw ==
=== Key ===
- Q = Qualifier
- WC = Wild card
- LL = Lucky loser
- Alt = Alternate
- SE = Special exempt
- PR = Protected ranking
- ITF = ITF entry
- JE = Junior exempt
- w/o = Walkover
- r = Retired
- d = Defaulted
- SR = Special ranking

=== Finals ===
Semifinals
1	(Greece) Stefanos Tsitsipas	3	6	6
4/WC	(Belgium) David Goffin	6	4	4
Q	(Spain) Alejandro Davidovich Fokina	6	2	2
LL	(Uruguay) Pablo Cuevas	3	6	6

Final
1	(Greece) Stefanos Tsitsipas	6	7^{7}
LL	(Uruguay) Pablo Cuevas	3	6^{4}

=== Top half ===
First round
(Argentina) G Andreozzi	6	6
(Bolivia) H Dellien	3	3
(Australia) B Tomic	3	0
(Australia) J Millman	6	6
Q	(Portugal) J Domingues	6	2	6
6	(Australia) A de Minaur	2	6	2
(Portugal) J Sousa	6	2	6
Q	(Australia) A Popyrin	4	6	2
(Tunisia) M Jaziri	6	3	6
(Chile) N Jarry	3	6	4
(Argentina) L Mayer	7^{7}	6
5	(Serbia) D Lajović	6^{3}	4

Second round
1	(Greece) S Tsitsipas	6	6
(Argentina) G Andreozzi	3	4
(Australia) J Millman	3	1^{r}
Q	(Portugal) J Domingues	6	2
4/WC	(Belgium) D Goffin	6	6
(Portugal) J Sousa	3	2
(Tunisia) M Jaziri	7^{7}	6
(Argentina) L Mayer	6^{2}	1

Quarterfinals
1	(Greece) S Tsitsipas	7^{7}	6
Q	(Portugal) J Domingues	6^{3}	4
4/WC	(Belgium) D Goffin	4	7^{7}	6
(Tunisia) M Jaziri	6	6^{4}	2

Semifinals
1	(Greece) S Tsitsipas	3	6	6
4/WC	(Belgium) D Goffin	6	4	4

=== Bottom half ===
First round
7/WC	(Spain) P Carreño Busta	7	1	2
(France) J Chardy	5	6	6
(United States) T Fritz	6^{3}	4
Q	(Spain) A Davidovich Fokina	7^{7}	6
(United States) R Opelka	7^{7}	6
WC	(Portugal) P Sousa	6^{2}	4
8	(United States) F Tiafoe	6	7
(Kazakhstan) M Kukushkin	3	5
(Japan) Y Nishioka	6	6
(United States) M McDonald	2	4
Q	(Italy) S Caruso	2	2
LL	(Uruguay) P Cuevas	6	6

Second round
(France) J Chardy	1	2
Q	(Spain) A Davidovich Fokina	6	6
(United States) R Opelka	6	3	0
3	(France) G Monfils	3	6	6
8	(United States) F Tiafoe	2	6	7^{7}
(Japan) Y Nishioka	6	3	6^{5}
LL	(Uruguay) P Cuevas	6	7
LL	(Italy) F Baldi	2	5

Quarterfinals
Q	(Spain) A Davidovich Fokina	6^{2}	7	6
3	(France) G Monfils	7^{7}	5	4
8	(United States) F Tiafoe	0	7^{7}	2
LL	(Uruguay) P Cuevas	6	6^{5}	6

Semifinals
Q	(Spain) A Davidovich Fokina	6	2	2
LL	(Uruguay) P Cuevas	3	6	6

== Qualifying ==
=== Seeds ===
1. (Uruguay) Pablo Cuevas (qualifying competition, lucky loser)
2. (United Kingdom) Dan Evans (qualifying competition)
3. (Sweden) Elias Ymer (first round)
4. (Australia) Alexei Popyrin (qualified)
5. (Slovakia) Jozef Kovalík (first round)
6. (United States) Bjorn Fratangelo (first round)
7. (Belarus) Egor Gerasimov (first round)
8. (Spain) Pedro Martínez (first round)

=== Qualifiers ===
1. (Italy) Salvatore Caruso
2. (Spain) Alejandro Davidovich Fokina
3. (Portugal) João Domingues
4. (Australia) Alexei Popyrin

=== Lucky losers ===
1. (Uruguay) Pablo Cuevas
2. (Italy) Filippo Baldi

=== Qualifying draw ===
==== First qualifier ====
First round
1	(Uruguay) Pablo Cuevas	6	7^{7}
(Germany) Daniel Brands	1	6^{4}
(Italy) Salvatore Caruso	6	5	7^{8}
8	(Spain) Pedro Martínez	3	7	6^{6}

Qualifying competition
1	(Uruguay) Pablo Cuevas	4	7	4
(Italy) Salvatore Caruso	6	5	6

==== Second qualifier ====
First round
2	(United Kingdom) Dan Evans	6	7
(Italy) Lorenzo Giustino	3	5
(Spain) Alejandro Davidovich Fokina	6	6
6	(United States) Bjorn Fratangelo	2	4

Qualifying competition
2	(United Kingdom) Dan Evans	6	1	4
(Spain) Alejandro Davidovich Fokina	3	6	6

==== Third qualifier ====
First round
3	(Sweden) Elias Ymer	3	6^{3}
WC	(Portugal) João Domingues	6	7^{7}
(Italy) Filippo Baldi	4	6	6
5	(Slovakia) Jozef Kovalík	6	3	2

Qualifying competition
WC	(Portugal) João Domingues	6	6
(Italy) Filippo Baldi	2	4

==== Fourth qualifier ====
First round
4	(Australia) Alexei Popyrin	7	7^{7}
WC	(Portugal) Gastão Elias	5	6^{5}
(Italy) Simone Bolelli	6	7^{7}
7	(Belarus) Egor Gerasimov	2	6^{0}

Qualifying competition
4	(Australia) Alexei Popyrin	2	6	6
(Italy) Simone Bolelli	6	3	4
