= 2016 Columbus Challenger 1 – Singles =

Singles
- 2016 Columbus Challenger 1

Final
- Champion: (Denmark) Mikael Torpegaard
- Runner-up: (Germany) Benjamin Becker
- Score: 6–4, 1–6, 6–2

Events
| Singles | Doubles |
- Columbus Challenger

Dennis Novikov was the defending champion but lost in the first round to Evan King.

Mikael Torpegaard won the title after defeating Benjamin Becker 6–4, 1–6, 6–2 in the final.

== Seeds ==
1. (Germany) Benjamin Becker (final)
2. (United States) Dennis Novikov (first round)
3. (United States) Austin Krajicek (first round)
4. (Canada) Peter Polansky (second round)
5. (United States) Ernesto Escobedo (first round, retired)
6. (El Salvador) Marcelo Arévalo (first round)
7. (Slovenia) Blaž Rola (second round)
8. (Brazil) Guilherme Clezar (first round)

== Draw ==
Key

- Q = Qualifier
- WC = Wild card
- LL = Lucky loser
- Alt = Alternate
- ITF = ITF entry
- PR = Protected ranking
- SR = Special ranking
- SE = Special exempt
- JE = Junior exempt
- JR = Junior Accelerator Programme entrant
- CO = College Accelerator Programme entrant
- NG = Next Gen Accelerator Program entrant
- w/o = Walkover
- r = Retired
- d = Defaulted

=== Finals ===
Semifinals
1 | (Germany) Benjamin Becker | 6 | 1 | 7
(Australia) John-Patrick Smith | 4 | 6 | 5
WC | (Denmark) Mikael Torpegaard | 7 | 7^{7}
(United States) Tennys Sandgren | 5 | 6^{5}

Final
1 | (Germany) Benjamin Becker | 4 | 6 | 2
WC | (Denmark) Mikael Torpegaard | 6 | 1 | 6

=== Top half ===
First round
1 | (Germany) B Becker | 7 | 6
(United States) E Quigley | 5 | 4
(Australia) S Groth | 6 | 7^{8}
Q | (United States) Jared Hiltzik | 3 | 6^{6}
WC | (United States) J. J. Wolf | 3 | 6^{4}
Q | (Latvia) M Lībietis | 6 | 7^{7}
(United Kingdom) C Norrie | 7^{7} | 1
5 | (United States) E Escobedo | 6^{4} | 0^{r}
3 | (United States) A Krajicek | 2 | 3
(United States) S Bangoura | 6 | 6
(United States) T Paul | 6 | 6
WC | (United States) J McNally | 3 | 3
(Poland) H Hurkacz | 6 | 7
(United Kingdom) L Glasspool | 4 | 5
(Australia) J-P Smith | 6 | 6
6/Alt | (El Salvador) M Arévalo | 1 | 1

Second round
1 | (Germany) B Becker | 6 | 6
(Australia) S Groth | 3 | 2
Q | (Latvia) M Lībietis | 6 | 7^{7}
(United Kingdom) C Norrie | 4 | 6^{5}
(United States) S Bangoura | 6 | 6
(United States) T Paul | 3 | 3
(Poland) H Hurkacz | 2 | 3
(Australia) J-P Smith | 6 | 6

Quarterfinals
1 | (Germany) B Becker | 4 | 6 | 7^{7}
Q | (Latvia) M Lībietis | 6 | 1 | 6^{4}
(United States) S Bangoura | 3 | 6 | 3
(Australia) J-P Smith | 6 | 3 | 6

Semifinals
1 | (Germany) B Becker | 6 | 1 | 7
(Australia) J-P Smith | 4 | 6 | 5

=== Bottom half ===
First round
8 | (Brazil) G Clezar | 2 | 4
(Canada) F Dancevic | 6 | 6
Q | (United States) Gonzales Austin | 6 | 6
WC | (United States) Martin Joyce | 4 | 2
WC | (Denmark) M Torpegaard | 6 | 6
(United States) N Meister | 4 | 3
(Ecuador) E Gómez | 5 | 4
4 | (Canada) P Polansky | 7 | 6
7 | (Slovenia) B Rola | 6 | 6
(South Africa) N Scholtz | 3 | 2
(United States) T Sandgren | 6 | 6
(Canada) P Bester | 4 | 4
Q | (Ecuador) R Quiroz | 6 | 6
(United Kingdom) B Klein | 4 | 2
(United States) E King | 6 | 6^{5} | 7^{7}
2 | (United States) D Novikov | 4 | 7^{7} | 6^{2}

Second round
(Canada) F Dancevic | 6^{4} | 3
Q | (United States) G Austin | 7^{7} | 6
WC | (Denmark) M Torpegaard | 6 | 6^{2} | 6
4 | (Canada) P Polansky | 4 | 7^{7} | 4
7 | (Slovenia) B Rola | 6^{3} | 3
(United States) T Sandgren | 7^{7} | 6
Q | (Ecuador) R Quiroz | 6 | 6
(United States) E King | 4 | 4

Quarterfinals
Q | (United States) G Austin | 2 | 5
WC | (Denmark) M Torpegaard | 6 | 7
(United States) T Sandgren | 6 | 7^{7}
Q | (Ecuador) R Quiroz | 0 | 6^{3}

Semifinals
WC | (Denmark) M Torpegaard | 7 | 7^{7}
(United States) T Sandgren | 5 | 6^{5}
