= Alexander Ward =

British tennis player

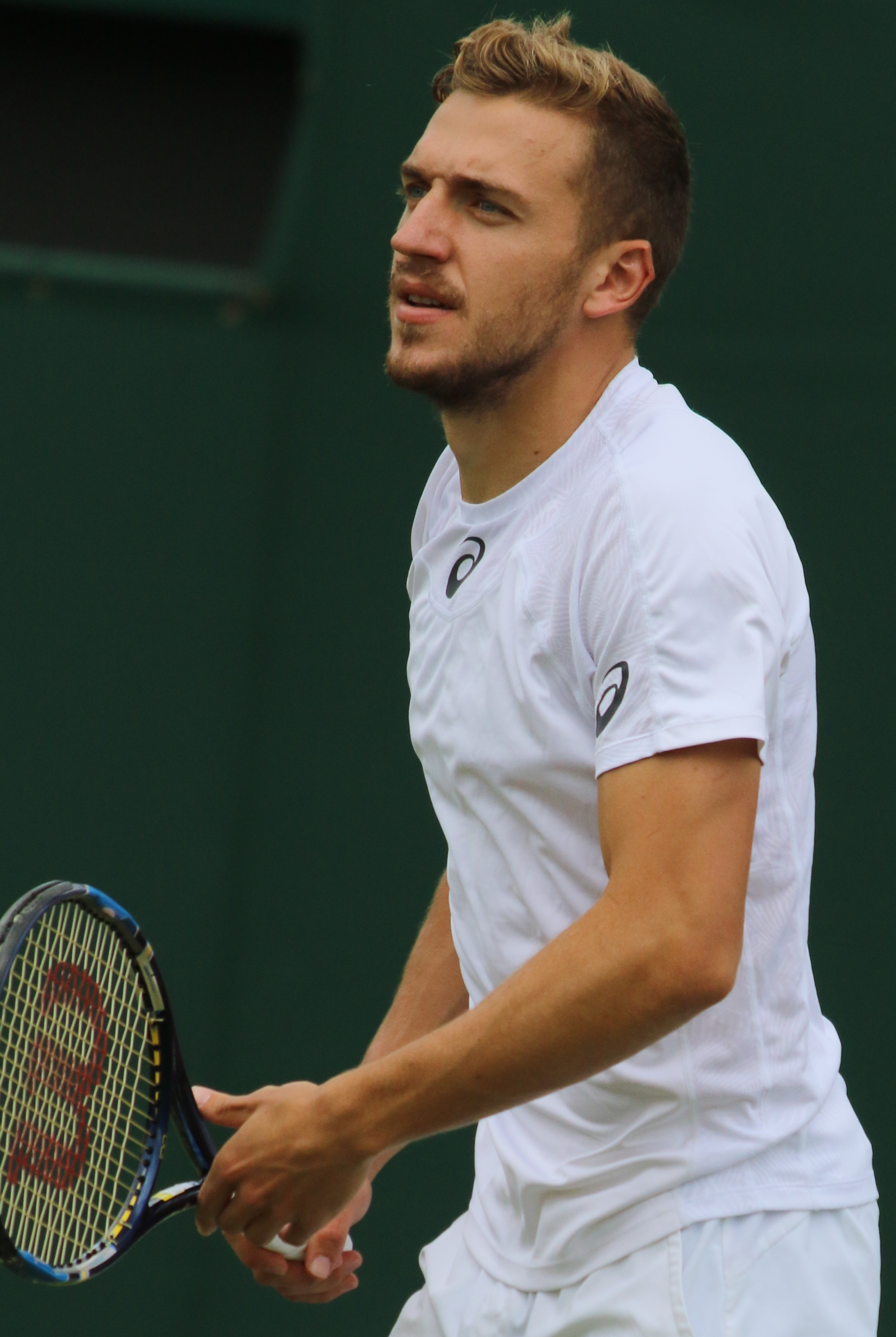
- Full name: Alexander Ward
- Country (sports): United Kingdom
- Born: 30 April 1990 (age 36) Northampton, England
- Height: 6 ft 1 in (1.85 m)
- Turned pro: 2008
- Retired: 2018
- Plays: Right-handed (two handed-backhand)
- Prize money: $279,019

Singles
- Career record: 0–4 (at ATP Tour level, Grand Slam level, and in Davis Cup)
- Career titles: 0
- Highest ranking: No. 242 (6 June 2016)

Grand Slam singles results
- Wimbledon: 1R (2016, 2017)

Doubles
- Career record: 0–1
- Career titles: 0
- Highest ranking: No. 379 (9 September 2013)

Grand Slam doubles results
- Wimbledon: 1R (2016)
- Last updated on: 10 September 2018.

Alexander Ward (born 30 April 1990) is a retired British tennis player.

== Early life ==
Ward was born on 30 April 1990 in Northampton, Northamptonshire, England. He was educated at Northampton School for Boys.

== Tennis career ==
Ward has a career high ATP singles ranking of 242 achieved on 6 June 2016. He also has a career high ATP doubles ranking of 379 achieved on 9 September 2013.

Ward made his ATP main draw debut at the 2013 MercedesCup after defeating Sandro Ehrat, Dustin Brown and Ivo Minář in the qualifying rounds. In the main draw he drew fifth seed Fabio Fognini, but lost 3–6, 6–7^{(5–7)}

Having come through qualifying as the world No. 855, Ward competed at the 2017 Wimbledon Championships, where he lost to compatriot Kyle Edmund in four sets in the first round.

In September 2018, Ward announced his retirement from professional tennis.

== ATP Challenger and ITF Futures finals ==
=== Singles: 27 (16–10) ===
Legend ATP Challenger Tour (0–1) ITF Futures Tour (16–9)	Finals by surface Hard (9–8) Clay (6–2) Grass (0–0) Carpet (1–0)

Result	W–L	Date	Tournament	Tier	Surface	Opponent	Score
Loss	0–1	May 2008	Spain F19, Balaguer	Futures	Clay	(Spain) David Diaz-Ventura	1–6, 4–6
Loss	0–2	Sep 2011	Great Britain F15, Nottingham	Futures	Hard	(United Kingdom) Richard Bloomfield	7–6^{(8–6)}, 3–6, 4–6
Loss	0–3	Sep 2011	Sweden F5, Danderyd	Futures	Hard (i)	(United Kingdom) George Morgan	6–4, 4–6, 4–6
Win	1–3	Oct 2011	Sweden F6, Falun	Futures	Hard (i)	(Sweden) Carl Bergman	2–6, 6–4, 6–1
Win	2–3	Nov 2011	Czech Republic F4, Rožnov pod Radhoštěm	Futures	Carpet (i)	(United Kingdom) Josh Goodall	6–1, 1–0 ret.
Win	3–3	Nov 2012	Thailand F6, Phuket	Futures	Hard (i)	(Russia) Mikhail Fufygin	6–3, 6–1
Loss	3–4	Dec 2012	Cambodia F2, Phnom Penh	Futures	Hard	(New Zealand) Artem Sitak	4–6, 7–6^{(7–3)}, 6–7^{(4–7)}
Loss	3–5	Mar 2014	Greece F3, Heraklion	Futures	Hard	(France) Martin Vaïsse	4–6, 4–6
Loss	3–6	Apr 2014	Greece F6, Heraklion	Futures	Hard	(France) Tristan Lamasine	Walkover
Win	4–6	Apr 2014	Greece F7, Heraklion	Futures	Hard	(Venezuela) Ricardo Rodríguez	6–0, 6–3
Win	5–6	Jun 2014	Portugal F6, Caldas da Rainha	Futures	Clay	(Brazil) Thales Turini	6–3, 6–2
Win	6–6	Jun 2014	Belgium F2, Binche	Futures	Clay	(Portugal) Frederico Ferreira Silva	2–6, 6–3, 7–6^{(9–7)}
Win	7–6	Jul 2014	Belgium F5, De Haan	Futures	Clay	(Belgium) Yannick Vandenbulcke	7–6^{(7–3)}, 6–1
Win	8–6	Sep 2014	Portugal F7, Castelo Branco	Futures	Hard	(France) Calvin Hemery	6–3, 3–6, 6–3
Loss	8–7	Jan 2015	Great Britain F2, Sunderland	Futures	Hard (i)	(United Kingdom) Daniel Cox	6–7^{(8–10)}, 3–6
Loss	8–8	May 2015	Spain F14, Vic	Futures	Clay	(France) Maxime Chazal	7–6^{(9–7)}, 6–7^{(4–7)}, 2–6
Win	9–8	Jul 2015	Spain F20, Getxo	Futures	Hard	(Spain) Pedro Martínez	6–1, 6–1
Win	10–8	Aug 2015	Egypt F25, Sharm El Sheikh	Futures	Hard	(Italy) Alessandro Bega	2–6, 6–3, 6–4
Loss	10–9	Aug 2015	Egypt F26, Sharm El Sheikh	Futures	Hard	(Serbia) Marko Tepavac	3–6, 2–6
Win	11–9	Sep 2015	Croatia F14, Bol	Futures	Clay	(Serbia) Miki Janković	6–2, 6–3
Win	12–9	Oct 2015	Spain F34, Melilla	Futures	Hard	(Spain) Roberto Ortega Olmedo	7–6^{(7–4)}, 5–7, 6–2
Win	13–9	Mar 2016	Turkey F10, Antalya	Futures	Clay	(Germany) Demian Raab	6–3, 6–3
Win	14–9	Apr 2016	Tunisia F12, Hammamet	Futures	Clay	(Portugal) Pedro Sousa	7–6^{(8–6)}, 6–0
Loss	14–9	Sep 2017	Columbus, United States	Challenger	Hard (i)	(Croatia) Ante Pavić	7–6^{(13–11)}, 4–6, 3–6
Win	15–10	Nov 2017	USA F38, Columbus	Futures	Hard (i)	(United Kingdom) Luke Bambridge	6–4, 6–4
Win	16–10	Dec 2017	USA F39, Waco	Futures	Hard (i)	(United States) Danny Thomas	6–1, 6–1

=== Doubles: 12 (4–8) ===
Legend ATP Challenger Tour (0–0) ITF Futures Tour (4–8)	Finals by surface Hard (2–2) Clay (2–6) Grass (0–0)

Result	W–L	Date	Tournament	Tier	Surface	Partner	Opponents	Score
Loss	0–1	Aug 2009	Belgium F2, Koksijde	Futures	Clay	(United Kingdom) Marcus Willis	(Morocco) Rabie Chaki (Belgium) Frederic De Fays	3–6, 2–6
Loss	0–2	Jan 2011	USA F1, Plantation	Futures	Clay	(United Kingdom) Daniel Smethurst	(Moldova) Roman Borvanov (United States) Denis Zivkovic	4–6, 4–6
Win	1–2	Oct 2012	Germany F19, Essen	Futures	Hard (i)	(Netherlands) Romano Frantzen	(Germany) Kevin Deden (Germany) Sascha Klör	3–6, 6–3, [10–6]
Loss	1–3	Nov 2012	Thailand F5, Phuket	Futures	Hard (i)	(France) Antoine Escoffier	(Australia) Brydan Klein (Australia) Dane Propoggia	3–6, 2–6
Loss	1–4	Nov 2012	Thailand F6, Phuket	Futures	Hard (i)	(France) Antoine Escoffier	(Australia) Ryan Agar (Austria) Sebastian Bader	6–7^{(2–7)}, 6–2, [8–10]
Win	2–4	Mar 2013	Great Britain F8, Sunderland	Futures	Hard (i)	(United Kingdom) Daniel Smethurst	(United Kingdom) Lewis Burton (United Kingdom) Dan Evans	7–5, 7–6^{(7–4)}
Loss	2–5	Apr 2013	France F8, Ajaccio	Futures	Clay	(United Kingdom) Daniel Smethurst	(Belgium) Niels Desein (Belgium) Yannick Mertens	2–6, 2–6
Win	3–5	Jun 2013	Spain F15, Madrid	Futures	Clay	(United Kingdom) Oliver Golding	(Germany) Richard Becker (Italy) Lorenzo Giustino	6–3, 2–6, [10–5]
Win	4–5	Aug 2015	Egypt F24, Sharm El Sheikh	Futures	Clay	(Australia) Dan Dowson	(Ukraine) Olexiy Kolisnyk (Ukraine) Anatoliy Petrenko	6–4, 6–3
Loss	4–6	Aug 2015	Egypt F26, Sharm El Sheikh	Futures	Clay	(Australia) Dan Dowson	(Ukraine) Olexiy Kolisnyk (Ukraine) Anatoliy Petrenko	4–6, 6–2, [8–10]
Loss	4–7	Apr 2016	Tunisia F12, Hammamet	Futures	Clay	(Australia) Dan Dowson	(Spain) Oriol Roca Batalla (Spain) David Vega Hernández	4–6, 2–6
Loss	4–8	Apr 2017	Spain F9, Madrid	Futures	Clay	(Spain) Álvaro López San Martín	(Argentina) Hernán Casanova (Bolivia) Federico Zeballos	6–7^{(4–7)}, 1–6
