= David O'Hare =

Irish tennis player (born 1990)

- Country (sports): Ireland
- Residence: Dublin, Ireland
- Born: 1 June 1990 (age 36) Dublin, Ireland
- Height: 193 cm (6 ft 4 in)
- Plays: Right-handed (one-handed backhand)
- College: University of Memphis
- Prize money: $58,799

Singles
- Career record: 0–0
- Career titles: 0
- Highest ranking: No. 1,438 (24 September 2015)
- Current ranking: Not ranked (17 February 2025)

Doubles
- Career record: 2–9
- Career titles: 0
- Highest ranking: No. 117 (3 April 2017)
- Current ranking: Not ranked (17 February 2025)
- Last updated on: 8 October 2018.

David O'Hare (born 1 June 1990) is an Irish professional tennis player and coach. On 24 August 2015 he reached his highest ATP singles ranking of 1438 and on 3 April 2017 reached his highest doubles ranking of 117. Despite being inactive in tour events, O'Hare still plays for the Irish Davis Cup team. He is the coach of the former No. 1 doubles player Joe Salisbury and has had considerable success, overseeing 2 US Open wins, 2 Masters titles and 2 Tour Final wins.

== Early life ==
O'Hare was born on 1 June 1990 to Joe and Alison O'Hare. He has two brothers, Simon and Mark, and one sister, Jenny. He competed for the Donnybrook LTC tennis club, a tennis club for boys ages 14–17.

O'Hare also competed in soccer, hurling, gaelic and basketball in high school. According to him, he was scouted by Manchester United for soccer when he was younger.

== College career ==
O'Hare played college tennis for the University of Memphis. In 2013, he made it all the way to the Round of 16 in the men's singles. The following year, he and Joe Salisbury became the first Tigers in school history to qualify for the NCAA doubles tournament.

In his time with Memphis, O'Hare earned three-time all-conference honoree in doubles. His 97 doubles wins alongside Salisbury are the most in school history. He graduated from Memphis in May 2014.

== Professional career ==
In 2014, he played in the ATP alongside Salisbury, but they lost to the Bryan brothers. He also represented Ireland in the Davis Cup alongside James Cluskey, but they lost to Belarus. The following year, they were relegated to Group Three of the Europe Zone in the Davis Cup after they were whitewashed 5–0 by South Africa.

In 2021, he played in the Davis Cup alongside Julian Bradley, Simon Carr, and Osgar O'Hoisin. In that tournament, they were promoted back to Group 2, with him and Carr securing a 2–1 victory over Georgia to do so.

O'Hare played again in 2023 as vice-captain alongside Carr, O'Hoisin, Michael Agwi, Conor Gannon, and team captain Conor Niland. There, they defeated El Salvador to get in the Group 1 playoffs. In the Group 1 playoffs, they were defeated by Austria.

== Coaching career ==
In 2021, O'Hare became the coach for Salisbury and Rajeev Ram in men's doubles. He guided them to become the world number 1 doubles pair and the 2022 US Open men's doubles title.

== Career finals ==
=== Doubles: 29 (18–11) ===
Legend (doubles) ATP Challenger Tour (5–6) ITF Futures Tour (13–5)	Titles by surface Hard (17–9) Clay (0–0) Grass (0–0) Carpet (1–2)

Result	W–L	Date	Tournament	Tier	Surface	Partner	Opponents	Score
Loss	0–1	Jul 2014	Ireland F1, Dublin	Futures	Carpet	(Republic of Ireland) Peter Bothwell	(United Kingdom) Edward Corrie (Denmark) Frederik Nielsen	2–6, 5–7
Loss	0–2	Sep 2014	Great Britain F15, London	Futures	Hard	(United Kingdom) Joe Salisbury	(Denmark) Frederik Nielsen (United Kingdom) Joshua Ward-Hibbert	7–6^{(7–5)}, 4–6, [8–10]
Win	1–2	Oct 2014	Sweden F6, Jönköping	Futures	Hard (i)	(United Kingdom) Joe Salisbury	(Sweden) Isak Arvidsson (Sweden) Markus Eriksson	7–6^{(10–8)}, 7–6^{(7–3)}
Loss	1–3	Oct 2014	France F23, Cap d'Agde	Futures	Hard (i)	(United Kingdom) Joe Salisbury	(Netherlands) Sander Groen (France) Alexandre Sidorenko	4–6, 7–5, [8–10]
Win	2–3	Oct 2014	France F24, Rodez	Futures	Hard (i)	(Republic of Ireland) James Cluskey	(Belgium) Maxime Authom (Belgium) Ruben Bemelmans	7–6^{(7–5)}, 3–6, [10–8]
Loss	2–4	Nov 2014	Great Britain F18, Loughborough	Futures	Hard (i)	(United Kingdom) Joe Salisbury	(United Kingdom) Scott Clayton (United Kingdom) Toby Martin	4–6, 4–6
Win	3–4	Nov 2014	Great Britain F19, Bath	Futures	Hard (i)	(United Kingdom) Joe Salisbury	(United Kingdom) Richard Gabb (United Kingdom) Jonny O'Mara	6–1, 6–2
Win	4–4	Nov 2014	Cyprus F3, Larnaca	Futures	Hard	(Republic of Ireland) Sam Barry	(Italy) Marco Bortolotti (Italy) Erik Crepaldi	6–1, 6–2
Loss	4–5	Dec 2014	Togo F1, Lomé	Futures	Hard	(United Kingdom) Joe Salisbury	(Belgium) Maxime Authom (Colombia) Juan Sebastián Gómez	3–6, 3–6
Win	5–5	Dec 2014	Togo F2, Lomé	Futures	Hard	(United Kingdom) Joe Salisbury	(Togo) Komlavi Loglo (France) Josselin Ouanna	7–6^{(7–5)}, 6–4
Win	6–5	Jul 2015	Ireland F1, Dublin	Futures	Carpet	(Republic of Ireland) Sam Barry	(Republic of Ireland) Simon Carr (Republic of Ireland) Bjorn Thomson	6–3, 2–6, [10–3]
Win	7–5	Sep 2015	Great Britain F8, Roehampton	Futures	Hard	(United Kingdom) Joe Salisbury	(United Kingdom) Neil Pauffley (United Kingdom) David Rice	6–2, 4–6, [10–5]
Win	8–5	Sep 2015	Sweden F4, Falun	Futures	Hard (i)	(United Kingdom) Joe Salisbury	(United Kingdom) James Marsalek (United Kingdom) Marcus Willis	6–3, 7–5
Win	9–5	Oct 2015	Sweden F5, Danderyd	Futures	Hard (i)	(United Kingdom) Joe Salisbury	(Republic of Ireland) Sam Barry (United Kingdom) David Rice	7–5, 6–7^{(5–7)}, [10–5]
Win	10–5	Nov 2015	Champaign, US	Challenger	Hard	(United Kingdom) Joe Salisbury	(United States) Austin Krajicek (United States) Nicholas Monroe	6–1, 6–4
Win	11–5	Jan 2016	USA F2, Long Beach	Futures	Hard	(United Kingdom) Joe Salisbury	(United States) Evan King (United States) Raymond Sarmiento	6–3, 7–6^{(7–4)}
Loss	11–6	Apr 2016	Gwangju, South Korea	Challenger	Hard	(Denmark) Frederik Nielsen	(Thailand) Sanchai Ratiwatana (Thailand) Sonchat Ratiwatana	3–6, 2–6
Loss	11–7	May 2016	Taipei City, Taiwan	Challenger	Carpet (i)	(Denmark) Frederik Nielsen	(Chinese Taipei) Hsieh Cheng-peng (Chinese Taipei) Yang Tsung-hua	6–7^{(6–8)}, 4–6
Win	12–7	Jun 2016	Spain F18, Palma del Río	Futures	Hard	(Denmark) Frederik Nielsen	(Colombia) Nicolás Barrientos (Spain) Jaume Pla Malfeito	6–4, 6–2
Loss	12–8	Jul 2016	Winnetka, US	Challenger	Hard	(United States) Sekou Bangoura	(United States) Stefan Kozlov (Australia) John-Patrick Smith	3–6, 3–6
Loss	12–9	Sep 2016	Saint-Rémy-de-Provence, France	Challenger	Hard	(United Kingdom) Joe Salisbury	(United Kingdom) Ken Skupski (United Kingdom) Neal Skupski	7–6^{(7–5)}, 4–6, [5–10]
Win	13–9	Nov 2016	Columbus, US	Challenger	Hard (i)	(United Kingdom) Joe Salisbury	(United Kingdom) Luke Bambridge (United Kingdom) Cameron Norrie	6–3, 6–4
Win	14–9	Feb 2017	Dallas, US	Challenger	Hard (i)	(United Kingdom) Joe Salisbury	(India) Jeevan Nedunchezhiyan (Indonesia) Christopher Rungkat	6–7^{(6–8)}, 6–3, [11–9]
Loss	14–10	Apr 2017	Saint-Brieuc, France	Challenger	Hard (i)	(United Kingdom) Joe Salisbury	(Germany) Andre Begemann (Denmark) Frederik Nielsen	3–6, 4–6
Win	15–10	Jun 2017	Spain F18, Palma del Río	Futures	Hard	(Denmark) Frederik Nielsen	(Switzerland) Adrien Bossel (Italy) Matteo Viola	6–1, 7–6^{(7–1)}
Win	16–10	Jul 2017	USA F23, Wichita	Futures	Hard	(United Kingdom) Luke Bambridge	(United States) Nathan Ponwith (United States) John Harrison Richmond	6–0, 6–3
Win	17–10	Jul 2017	Winnipeg, Canada	Challenger	Hard	(United Kingdom) Luke Bambridge	(Japan) Yusuke Takahashi (Japan) Renta Tokuda	6–2, 6–2
Loss	17–11	Sep 2017	Columbus, United States	Challenger	Hard (i)	(United Kingdom) Luke Bambridge	(Germany) Dominik Köpfer (United States) Denis Kudla	6–7^{(6–8)}, 6–7^{(3–7)}
Win	18–11	Oct 2017	Fairfield, US	Challenger	Hard	(United Kingdom) Luke Bambridge	(Egypt) Akram El Sallaly (Brazil) Bernardo Oliveira	6–4, 6–2
