= Peter Kobelt =

American tennis player

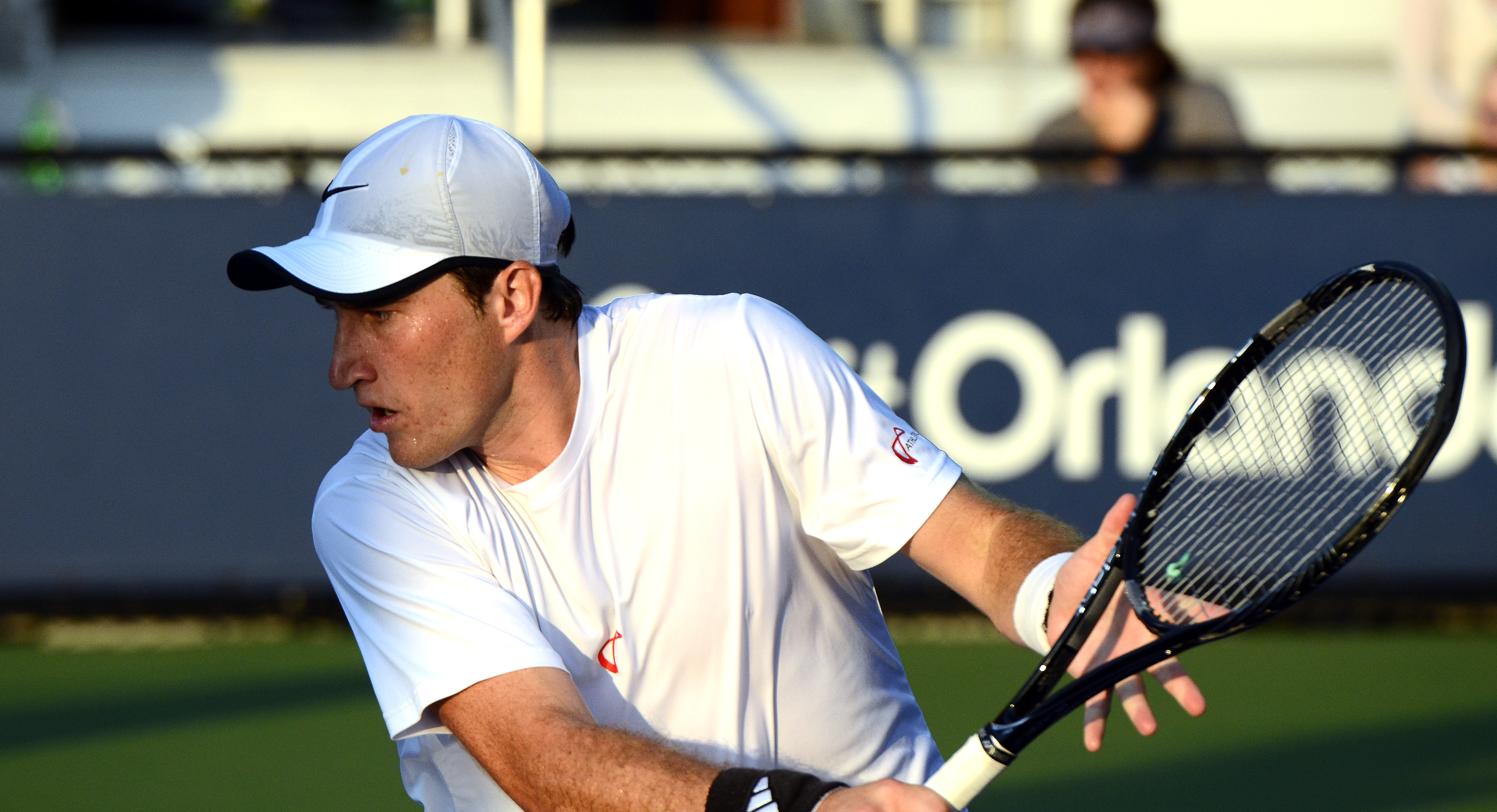
- Country (sports): United States
- Residence: Columbus, OH, U.S.
- Born: November 17, 1990 (age 35) Cincinnati, OH, U.S.
- Height: 6 ft 7 in (2.01 m)
- Turned pro: 2012
- Plays: Right-handed (one-handed backhand)
- Prize money: $77,543

Singles
- Career record: 5-7 (from ATP Challenger Tour)
- Career titles: 0
- Highest ranking: No. 332 (16 May 2016)
- Current ranking: No.

Doubles
- Career record: 0–1
- Career titles: 0
- Highest ranking: No. 378 (3 November 2014)

Grand Slam doubles results
- US Open: 1R (2014)

Peter Kobelt (born November 17, 1990) is an American tennis player. He competed in the 2014 US Open alongside doubles partner Hunter Reese after receiving a wildcard into the men's doubles draw. The pair lost 4–6, 1–6 to Michaël Llodra and Nicolas Mahut in the first round. Kobelt was raised in New Albany, Ohio and is a 2009 graduate of New Albany High School. He then attended Ohio State University, graduating in 2014.

In 2020, Kobelt entered the field of coaching. From 2020 to 2022, he was a volunteer assistant coach for the Kentucky Wildcats men's tennis team. From 2023 to 2024, he served as the interim head coach of the Nebraska Cornhuskers men's tennis team, leading the team to a 17–10 record, its best since 1990, and in 2024, Nebraska Athletic Director Troy Dannen named Kobelt the 12th permanent head coach of the team.
