= Luke Bambridge =

British tennis player (born 1995)

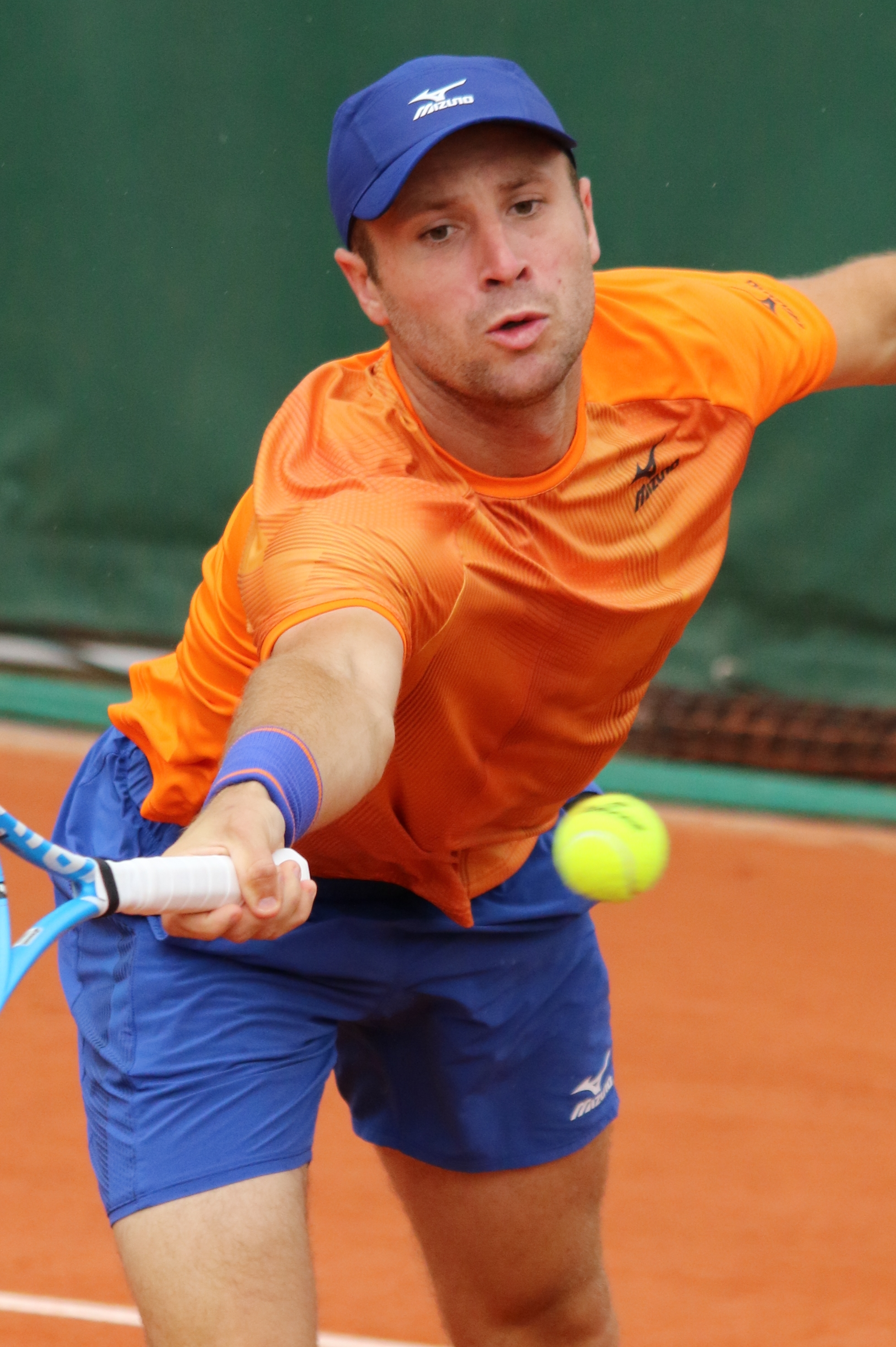
- Bambridge at the 2019 French Open
- Country (sports): United Kingdom
- Residence: Nottingham, United Kingdom
- Born: 21 January 1995 (age 31) Nottingham, United Kingdom
- Height: 6 ft 3 in (191 cm)
- Turned pro: 2013
- Retired: 2021 (last match played)
- Plays: Right-handed (two-handed backhand)
- Prize money: $548,895

Singles
- Career record: 0–0
- Career titles: 0
- Highest ranking: No. 481 (9 May 2016)

Grand Slam singles results
- Wimbledon: Q1 (2012)

Doubles
- Career record: 58–56
- Career titles: 3
- Highest ranking: No. 41 (27 May 2019)

Grand Slam doubles results
- Australian Open: 2R (2019, 2021)
- French Open: 1R (2019, 2020, 2021)
- Wimbledon: 2R (2021)
- US Open: QF (2019)

Mixed doubles

Grand Slam mixed doubles results
- French Open: 2R (2019)
- Wimbledon: 2R (2019, 2021)
- Last updated on: 9 September 2022.

Luke Bambridge (born 21 January 1995) is a British former tennis player. A doubles specialist, he reached a career-high Association of Tennis Professionals (ATP) world No. 41 doubles ranking in May 2019.

His career highlights included winning three ATP Tour titles, 7 ATP Challenger Tour titles, 20 ITF doubles titles and 1 ITF singles title.

== Tennis career ==
=== 2011 ===
Great Britain won the 2011 Junior Davis Cup tournament for the first time after beating Italy in the final in San Luis Potosí, Mexico. Coached by Greg Rusedski, the team of Bambridge, Kyle Edmund, and Evan Hoyt justified their top seeding in the event.

=== 2013 ===
Bambridge won four ITF doubles tournaments with different partners in Great Britain, Israel, and Greece.

=== 2014 ===
Seven more ITF doubles tournament wins by Bambridge in 2014, five with Liam Broady as his partner.

=== 2015 ===
Bambridge received a wildcard into the 2015 Wimbledon Championships men's doubles event, partnering Liam Broady where he made his grand slam debut. 2015 was also the year in which Bambridge won his first singles ITF tournament at the Qatar F4 Futures.

=== 2019 ===
Bambridge, in partnership with Ben McLachlan, reached his first Grand Slam quarterfinal at the 2019 US Open. The pairing beat ninth seeds Nikola Mektić and Franko Škugor in the second round, before exiting against top seeds Juan Sebastián Cabal and Robert Farah in the last eight.

== ATP career finals ==
=== Doubles: 9 (3 titles, 6 runners-up) ===
Legend Grand Slam tournaments (0–0) ATP World Tour Finals (0–0) ATP World Tour Masters 1000 (0–0) ATP World Tour 500 Series (0–0) ATP World Tour 250 Series (3–6)	Finals by surface Hard (2–3) Clay (0–3) Grass (1–0)	Finals by setting Outdoor (2–5) Indoor (1–1)

Result	W–L	Date	Tournament	Tier	Surface	Partner	Opponents	Score
Win	1–0	Jun 2018	Eastbourne International, United Kingdom	250 Series	Grass	(United Kingdom) Jonny O'Mara	(United Kingdom) Ken Skupski (United Kingdom) Neal Skupski	7–5, 6–4
Win	2–0	Oct 2018	Stockholm Open, Sweden	250 Series	Hard (i)	(United Kingdom) Jonny O'Mara	(New Zealand) Marcus Daniell (Netherlands) Wesley Koolhof	7–5, 7–6^{(10–8)}
Loss	2–1	Jan 2019	Maharashtra Open, India	250 Series	Hard	(United Kingdom) Jonny O'Mara	(India) Rohan Bopanna (India) Divij Sharan	3–6, 4–6
Loss	2–2	Mar 2019	Brasil Open, Brazil	250 Series	Clay (i)	(United Kingdom) Jonny O'Mara	(Argentina) Federico Delbonis (Argentina) Máximo González	4–6, 3–6
Loss	2–3	May 2019	Estoril Open, Portugal	250 Series	Clay	(United Kingdom) Jonny O'Mara	(France) Jérémy Chardy (France) Fabrice Martin	5–7, 6–7^{(3–7)}
Loss	2–4	Jan 2020	Qatar Open, Qatar	250 Series	Hard	(Mexico) Santiago González	(India) Rohan Bopanna (Netherlands) Wesley Koolhof	6–3, 2–6, [6–10]
Win	3–4	Jan 2020	Auckland Open, New Zealand	250 Series	Hard	(Japan) Ben McLachlan	(New Zealand) Marcus Daniell (Austria) Philipp Oswald	7–6^{(7–3)}, 6–3
Loss	3–5	Feb 2020	Delray Beach Open, United States	250 Series	Hard	(Japan) Ben McLachlan	(United States) Bob Bryan (United States) Mike Bryan	6–3, 5–7, [5–10]
Loss	3–6	May 2021	Estoril Open, Portugal	250 Series	Clay	(United Kingdom) Dominic Inglot	(Monaco) Hugo Nys (Germany) Tim Pütz	5–7, 6–3, [3–10]

== ITF Career finals ==
=== Singles: 7 (1–6) ===
Legend (singles)
Challengers (0–0)
Futures (1–6)

Result	W–L	Date	Tournament	Tier	Surface	Opponent	Score
Loss	0–1	Nov 2013	Greece F19, Heraklion	Futures	Hard	(United Kingdom) Oliver Golding	6–1, 2–6, 3–6
Loss	0–2	Apr 2014	Great Britain F9, Bournemouth	Futures	Clay	(United Kingdom) Liam Broady	5–7, 2–6
Loss	0–3	Oct 2015	Turkey F39, Antalya	Futures	Hard	(United Kingdom) Liam Broady	5–7, 3–6
Win	1–3	Dec 2015	Qatar F4, Doha	Futures	Hard	(Czech Republic) Dominik Kellovský	6–2, 3–6, 6–1
Loss	1–4	Dec 2015	Qatar F6, Doha	Futures	Hard	(Belgium) Joris De Loore	3–6, 3–6
Loss	1–5	Oct 2016	USA F32, Harlingen	Futures	Hard	(Germany) Dominik Köpfer	4–6, 4–6
Loss	1–6	Nov 2017	USA F38, Columbus	Futures	Hard (i)	(United Kingdom) Alexander Ward	4–6, 4–6

=== Doubles: 56 (27–29) ===
Legend (doubles) ATP Challenger Tour (7–10) ITF Futures Tour (20–19)	Titles by surface Hard (23–25) Clay (3–4) Grass (1–0) Carpet (0–0)

Result	W–L	Date	Tournament	Tier	Surface	Partner	Opponents	Score
Win	1–0	May 2013	Great Britain F11, Newcastle	Futures	Clay	(United Kingdom) Cameron Norrie	(United Kingdom) Scott Clayton (United Kingdom) Toby Martin	6–0, 4–6, [10–3]
Win	2–0	Oct 2013	Israel F14, Ramat HaSharon	Futures	Hard	(United Kingdom) Evan Hoyt	(United Kingdom) Liam Broady (United Kingdom) Joshua Ward-Hibbert	7–6^{(7–5)}, 7–6^{(7–4)}
Win	3–0	Nov 2013	Great Britain F23, Edgbaston	Futures	Hard (i)	(United Kingdom) George Morgan	(United Kingdom) Scott Clayton (United Kingdom) Jonny O'Mara	7–5, 4–6, [10–7]
Loss	3–1	Nov 2013	Greece F18, Heraklion	Futures	Hard	(United Kingdom) Oliver Golding	(Serbia) Marko Djokovic (Spain) Carlos Gómez-Herrera	1–6, 7–6^{(7–3)}, [11–13]
Win	4–1	Nov 2013	Greece F19, Heraklion	Futures	Hard	(United Kingdom) Oliver Golding	(Germany) Andreas Mies (Germany) Oscar Otte	6–3, 7–5
Loss	4–2	Dec 2013	Qatar F3, Doha	Futures	Hard	(United Kingdom) Evan Hoyt	(Poland) Adam Chadaj (Germany) Dominik Schulz	6–1, 6–7^{(4–7)}, [4–10]
Loss	4–3	Feb 2014	Great Britain F4, Wirral	Futures	Hard (i)	(United Kingdom) Ross Hutchins	(United Kingdom) Edward Corrie (United Kingdom) Daniel Smethurst	7–5, 6–7^{(6–8)}, [6–10]
Win	5–3	Mar 2014	Great Britain F6, Shrewsbury	Futures	Hard (i)	(United Kingdom) Toby Martin	(Sweden) Isak Arvidsson (Finland) Micke Kontinen	6–3, 6–4
Win	6–3	Mar 2014	Great Britain F7, Preston	Futures	Hard (i)	(United Kingdom) Liam Broady	(Denmark) Frederik Nielsen (United Kingdom) Joshua Ward-Hibbert	6–4, 6–4
Loss	6–4	Apr 2014	Qatar F2, Doha	Futures	Hard	(France) Antoine Benneteau	(Chinese Taipei) Chen Ti (South Africa) Ruan Roelofse	4–6, 3–6
Loss	6–5	Jun 2014	USA F16, Buffalo	Futures	Clay	(United Kingdom) Liam Broady	(United States) Jean-Yves Aubone (United States) Connor Smith	3–6, 6–2, [6–10]
Loss	6–6	Jun 2014	USA F18, Rochester	Futures	Clay	(United Kingdom) Liam Broady	(United States) Daniel Nguyen (United States) Connor Smith	3–6, 3–6
Win	7–6	Jul 2014	USA F19, Pittsburgh	Futures	Clay	(United Kingdom) Liam Broady	(United States) Gonzales Austin (United States) Quinton Vega	7–5, 6–4
Win	8–6	Jul 2014	USA F20, Tulsa	Futures	Hard	(United Kingdom) Liam Broady	(Mexico) Daniel Garza (Mexico) Raúl Isaías Rosas Zarur	6–4, 5–2, ret.
Win	9–6	Jul 2014	USA F21, Godfrey	Futures	Hard	(United Kingdom) Liam Broady	(United States) Brett Clark (United States) Ronnie Schneider	6–3, 6–2
Win	10–6	Aug 2014	USA F22, Decatur	Futures	Hard	(United Kingdom) Liam Broady	(United Kingdom) Scott Clayton (United Kingdom) Toby Martin	5–7, 6–2, [10–7]
Loss	10–7	Sep 2014	Great Britain F16, Wrexham	Futures	Hard	(United Kingdom) Liam Broady	(United Kingdom) Edward Corrie (United Kingdom) David Rice	7–6^{(7–3)}, 4–6, [8–10]
Win	11–7	Sep 2014	Portugal F7, Castelo Branco	Futures	Hard	(United Kingdom) Joshua Ward-Hibbert	(Spain) Iván Arenas Gualda (Spain) Jaime Pulgar García	7–6^{(7–0)}, 6–4
Loss	11–8	Jan 2015	Great Britain F1, Sheffield	Futures	Hard (i)	(United Kingdom) Andrew Bettles	(Sweden) Isak Arvidsson (Finland) Micke Kontinen	4–6, 7–5, [6–10]
Win	12–8	Mar 2015	Great Britain F5, Shrewsbury	Futures	Hard (i)	(United Kingdom) Scott Clayton	(United Kingdom) Sean Thornley (United Kingdom) Marcus Willis	7–6^{(7–3)}, 6–4
Loss	12–9	Oct 2015	Egypt F35, Sharm El Sheikh	Futures	Hard	(United Kingdom) Richard Gabb	(Egypt) Karim-Mohamed Maamoun (Egypt) Sherif Sabry	4–6, 6–4, [6–10]
Loss	12–10	Oct 2015	Egypt F36, Sharm El Sheikh	Futures	Hard	(United Kingdom) Richard Gabb	(Portugal) André Gaspar Murta (Portugal) Frederico Ferreira Silva	6–7^{(4–7)}, 3–6
Win	13–10	Nov 2015	Egypt F37, Sharm El Sheikh	Futures	Hard	(United Kingdom) Richard Gabb	(Italy) Enrico Dalla Valle (Italy) Julian Ocleppo	7–6^{(7–3)}, 6–4
Loss	13–11	Dec 2015	Qatar F4, Doha	Futures	Hard	(Japan) Kaichi Uchida	(Belgium) Joris De Loore (Belgium) Laurens Verboven	4–6, 6–3, [7–10]
Loss	13–12	Dec 2015	Qatar F5, Doha	Futures	Hard	(Germany) Mats Moraing	(Belgium) Joris De Loore (Belgium) Michael Geerts	5–7, 3–6
Loss	13–13	Dec 2015	Qatar F6, Doha	Futures	Hard	(Germany) Mats Moraing	(India) Haadin Bava (China) Wang Aoxiong	2–6, 6–3, [3–10]
Loss	13–14	Mar 2016	Canada F2, Sherbrooke	Futures	Hard (i)	(United Kingdom) Liam Broady	(South Africa) Keith-Patrick Crowley (United States) Max Schnur	6–3, 6–7^{(3–7)}, [6–10]
Win	14–14	Apr 2016	USA F12, Memphis	Futures	Hard	(United Kingdom) Darren Walsh	(Mexico) Daniel Garza (Mexico) Tigre Hank	6–1, 6–2
Win	15–14	May 2016	Mexica F1, Córdoba	Futures	Hard	(United Kingdom) Farris Fathi Gosea	(Mexico) Mauricio Astorga (Mexico) Manuel Sánchez	7–6^{(7–3)}, 7–6^{(7–2)}
Loss	15–15	Jul 2016	USA F25, Edwardsville	Futures	Hard	(Australia) Marc Polmans	(United States) Connor Smith (United States) Jackson Withrow	3–6, 2–6
Win	16–15	Oct 2016	USA F32, Harlingen	Futures	Hard	(United States) Evan King	(United States) John McNally (United States) Evan Zhu	6–4, 6–4
Loss	16–16	Nov 2016	Champaign, United States	Challenger	Hard (i)	(United Kingdom) Liam Broady	(United States) Austin Krajicek (United States) Tennys Sandgren	6–7^{(4–7)}, 6–7^{(2–7)}
Loss	16–17	Nov 2016	Columbus, United States	Challenger	Hard (i)	(United Kingdom) Cameron Norrie	(Republic of Ireland) David O'Hare (United Kingdom) Joe Salisbury	3–6, 4–6
Loss	16–18	Jan 2017	USA F1, Los Angeles	Futures	Hard	(United Kingdom) Joe Salisbury	(Germany) Yannick Hanfmann (Ecuador) Roberto Quiroz	6–3, 4–6, [8–10]
Loss	16–19	Jan 2017	USA F2, Long Beach	Futures	Hard	(United Kingdom) Joe Salisbury	(United States) Austin Krajicek (United States) Jackson Withrow	3–6, 6–3, [8–10]
Win	17–19	Apr 2017	USA F13, Little Rock	Futures	Hard	(Australia) Gavin van Peperzeel	(Canada) Philip Bester (Croatia) Ante Pavić	2–6, 6–3, [11–9]
Loss	17–20	May 2017	Savannah, United States	Challenger	Clay	(United States) Mitchell Krueger	(Canada) Peter Polansky (United Kingdom) Neal Skupski	6–4, 3–6, [1–10]
Win	18–20	Jul 2017	USA F23, Wichita	Futures	Hard	(Republic of Ireland) David O'Hare	(United States) Nathan Ponwith (United States) John Harrison Richmond	6–0, 6–3
Win	19–20	Jul 2017	Winnipeg, Canada	Challenger	Hard	(Republic of Ireland) David O'Hare	(Japan) Yusuke Takahashi (Japan) Renta Tokuda	6–2, 6–2
Loss	19–21	Sep 2017	Columbus, United States	Challenger	Hard (i)	(Republic of Ireland) David O'Hare	(Germany) Dominik Köpfer (United States) Denis Kudla	6–7^{(6–8)}, 6–7^{(3–7)}
Win	20–21	Oct 2017	Fairfield, United States	Challenger	Hard	(Republic of Ireland) David O'Hare	(Egypt) Akram El Sallaly (Brazil) Bernardo Oliveira	6–4, 6–2
Loss	20–22	Nov 2017	USA F38, Columbus	Futures	Hard (i)	(United Kingdom) Edward Corrie	(Mexico) Hans Hach Verdugo (Venezuela) Luis David Martínez	6–3, 6–7^{(2–7)}, [7–10]
Loss	20–23	Jan 2018	USA F1, Los Angeles	Futures	Hard	(Mexico) Hans Hach Verdugo	(United States) Martin Redlicki (Brazil) Karue Sell	4–6, 3–6
Win	21–23	Jan 2018	USA F2, Long Beach	Futures	Hard	(Mexico) Hans Hach Verdugo	(United States) Collin Altamirano (United States) Alexander Lebedev	6–3, 6–2
Loss	21–24	Feb 2018	San Francisco, United States	Challenger	Hard (i)	(United Kingdom) Joe Salisbury	(El Salvador) Marcelo Arévalo (Venezuela) Roberto Maytín	3–6, 7–6^{(5–7)}, [7–10]
Win	22–24	Mar 2018	Canada F2, Sherbrooke	Futures	Hard (i)	(United Kingdom) Joe Salisbury	(Switzerland) Adrien Bossel (Belgium) Joris De Loore	6–3, 7–5
Loss	22–25	Mar 2018	Saint-Brieuc, France	Challenger	Hard (i)	(United Kingdom) Joe Salisbury	(Netherlands) Sander Arends (Austria) Tristan-Samuel Weissborn	6–4, 1–6, [7–10]
Loss	22–26	Apr 2018	Mexico City, Mexico	Challenger	Clay	(United Kingdom) Jonny O'Mara	(Germany) Yannick Hanfmann (Germany) Kevin Krawietz	2–6, 6–7^{(3–7)}
Win	23–26	May 2018	Savannah, United States	Challenger	Clay	(Australia) Akira Santillan	(Spain) Enrique López Pérez (India) Jeevan Nedunchezhiyan	6–2, 6–2
Loss	23–27	May 2018	Loughborough, United Kingdom	Challenger	Hard (i)	(United Kingdom) Jonny O'Mara	(Denmark) Frederik Nielsen (United Kingdom) Joe Salisbury	6–3, 3–6, [4–10]
Win	24–27	Jun 2018	Surbiton, United Kingdom	Challenger	Grass	(United Kingdom) Jonny O'Mara	(United Kingdom) Ken Skupski (United Kingdom) Neal Skupski	7–6^{(13–11)}, 4–6, [10–7]
Win	25–27	Aug 2018	Vancouver, Canada	Challenger	Hard	(United Kingdom) Neal Skupski	(Australia) Marc Polmans (Australia) Max Purcell	4–6, 6–3, [10–6]
Win	26–27	Sep 2018	Chicago, United States	Challenger	Hard	(United Kingdom) Neal Skupski	(India) Leander Paes (Mexico) Miguel Ángel Reyes-Varela	6–3, 6–4
Win	27–27	Sep 2018	Orléans, France	Challenger	Hard (i)	(United Kingdom) Jonny O'Mara	(Germany) Yannick Maden (Austria) Tristan-Samuel Weissborn	6–2, 6–4
Loss	27–28	Apr 2019	Sarasota, United States	Challenger	Clay	(United Kingdom) Jonny O'Mara	(Uruguay) Martín Cuevas (Italy) Paolo Lorenzi	6–7^{(5–7)}, 6–7^{(6–8)}
Loss	27–29	Nov 2020	Cary, United States	Challenger	Hard	(United States) Nathaniel Lammons	(Russia) Teymuraz Gabashvili (United States) Dennis Novikov	5-7, 6–4, [8-10]

== Doubles performance timeline ==
Key
W	F	SF	QF	#R	RR	Q#	DNQ	A	NH

(W) winner; (F) finalist; (SF) semifinalist; (QF) quarterfinalist; (#R) rounds 4, 3, 2, 1; (RR) round-robin stage; (Q#) qualification round; (DNQ) did not qualify; (A) absent; (NH) not held; (SR) strike rate (events won / competed); (W–L) win–loss record.
To avoid confusion and double counting, these charts are updated at the conclusion of a tournament or when the player's participation has ended.

Current after the 2021 US Open.

Tournament	2013	2014	2015	2016	2017	2018	2019	2020	2021	SR	W–L
Grand Slam tournaments
Australian Open	A	A	A	A	A	A	2R	1R	2R	0 / 3	2–3
French Open	A	A	A	A	A	A	1R	1R	1R	0 / 3	0–3
Wimbledon	A	A	1R	A	Q1	1R	1R	NH	2R	0 / 4	1–4
US Open	A	A	A	A	A	1R	QF	1R	1R	0 / 4	3–4
Win–loss	0–0	0–0	0–1	0–0	0–0	0–2	4–4	0–3	2–4	0 / 14	6–14
Career statistics
Tournaments	0	0	1	0	0	8	23	12	16	60	
Titles	0	0	0	0	0	2	0	1	0	3	
Finals	0	0	0	0	0	2	3	3	1	9	
Win–loss	0–0	0–0	0–1	0–0	0–0	9–6	24–23	11–12	14–15	58–56	
Year-end ranking	489	303	280	218	139	56	51	62	73		

== World TeamTennis ==
Bambridge made his World TeamTennis debut in 2019 with the Orange County Breakers. It was announced that he will be return with the Orange County Breakers during the 2020 WTT season set to begin July 12.
