= John McNally (tennis) =

American Professional tennis player

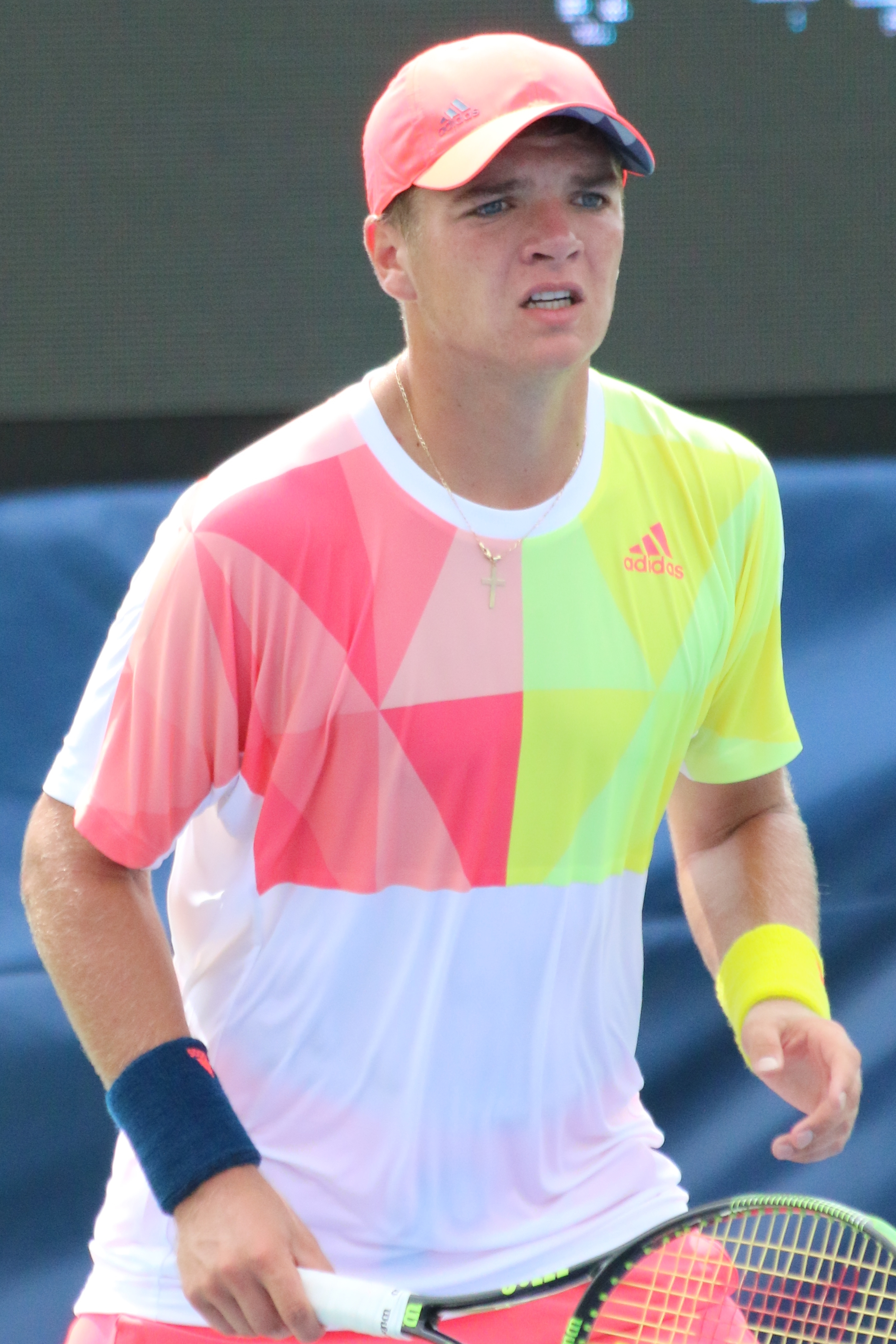
- McNally at the 2016 US Open
- Country (sports): United States
- Residence: Cincinnati, Ohio, United States
- Born: 18 October 1998 (age 27) Cincinnati, Ohio, United States
- Height: 1.83 m (6 ft 0 in)
- Turned pro: June 2021
- Retired: 2022
- Plays: Right-handed (two handed-backhand)
- College: Ohio State University
- Coach: Lynn Nabors McNally; Kevin O’Neill
- Prize money: US $53,316

Singles
- Career record: 0–0
- Career titles: 0; 0 Challenger, 1 Futures
- Highest ranking: No. 470 (July 29, 2019)

Doubles
- Career record: 0–1
- Career titles: 0; 0 Challenger, 2 Futures
- Highest ranking: No. 452 (February 20, 2023)

Grand Slam doubles results
- US Open: 1R (2016)

John McNally (born October 18, 1998) is a former American tennis player. He has a career high ATP singles ranking of world No. 470 achieved on July 29, 2019 and a career high doubles ranking of No. 452 achieved on February 20, 2023.

== Juniors ==
On the junior tour, McNally had a career high ranking of No. 13 achieved on 30 May 2016.

== Professional career ==
McNally made his Grand Slam main draw debut at the 2016 US Open in the doubles event, partnering J. J. Wolf.

He won his first Professional Title at the ITF Mens 25K Future in Columbus, Ohio.(November 2021)

He received a wild card into qualifying for the 2019 Western & Southern Open.

His younger sister, Caty McNally, is also a professional tennis player. Both are coached by their mother.

On 13 November 2022, he announced his retirement via Instagram.

== ATP Challenger and ITF Futures finals ==
=== Singles: 2 (1–1) ===
Legend ATP Challenger (0–0) ITF Futures (1–1)	Finals by surface Hard (1–1) Clay (0–0) Grass (0–0) Carpet (0–0)

Result	W–L	Date	Tournament	Tier	Surface	Opponent	Score
Loss	0–1	Jul 2019	M25 Iowa City, USA	World Tennis Tour	Hard	(United States) Alex Rybakov	6–7^{(5–7)}, 7–5, 6–7^{(3–7)}
Win	1–1	Nov 2021	M25 Columbus, USA	World Tennis Tour	Hard (i)	(United States) James Tracy	4–6, 7–6^{(7–2)}, 6–3

=== Doubles: 7 (5–2) ===
Legend ATP Challenger (0–0) ITF Futures (5–2)	Finals by surface Hard (4–2) Clay (1–0) Grass (0–0) Carpet (0–0)

Result	W–L	Date	Tournament	Tier	Surface	Partner	Opponents	Score
Loss	0–1	Oct 2016	USA F32, Harlingen	Futures	Hard	(United States) Evan Zhu	(United Kingdom) Luke Bambridge (United States) Evan King	4–6, 4–6
Win	1–1	Jun 2018	USA F16, Rochester	Futures	Clay	(United States) Cannon Kingsley	(Colombia) Alejandro Gómez (Canada) Pavel Krainik	6–4, 6–4
Loss	1–2	Jun 2021	M25 Wichita, USA	World Tennis Tour	Hard	(Canada) Benjamin Sigouin	(Chile) Nicolás Acevedo Olmos (Bolivia) Murkel Dellien	4–6, 6–2, [10–12]
Win	2–2	Oct 2021	M15 Tallahassee, USA	World Tennis Tour	Hard (i)	(Canada) Liam Draxl	(Australia) Thomas Fancutt (Northern Mariana Islands) Colin Sinclair	6–2, 6–3
Win	3–2	Oct 2022	M15 Ithaca, USA	World Tennis Tour	Hard (i)	(Canada) Benjamin Sigouin	(United States) Nico Mostardi (Germany) Jannik Opitz	6–4, 7–6^{(7–5)}
Win	4–2	Nov 2022	M15 Ithaca, USA	World Tennis Tour	Hard (i)	(Japan) Shunsuke Mitsui	(Cyprus) Menelaos Efstathiou (Germany) Jakob Schnaitter	6–3, 6–2
Win	5–2	Nov 2022	M25 Columbus, USA	World Tennis Tour	Hard (i)	(United States) Eduardo Nava	(Australia) Joshua Charlton (United States) Quinn Vandecasteele	6–4, 6–4
