= 2022 Sanremo Challenger – Doubles =

Doubles
- 2022 Sanremo Challenger

Final
- Champions: (France) Geoffrey Blancaneaux (France) Alexandre Müller
- Runners-up: (Italy) Flavio Cobolli (Italy) Matteo Gigante
- Score: 4–6, 6–3, [11–9]

Events
Singles	Doubles
← 2010 ·	Sanremo Challenger	· 2023 →

This was the first edition of the tournament since it was discontinued in 2011.

Geoffrey Blancaneaux and Alexandre Müller won the title after defeating Flavio Cobolli and Matteo Gigante 4–6, 6–3, [11–9] in the final.

== Seeds ==
1. (Netherlands) Sander Arends / (Netherlands) David Pel (quarterfinals)
2. (Switzerland) Luca Margaroli / (Austria) Lucas Miedler (quarterfinals)
3. (Philippines) Ruben Gonzales / (Indonesia) Christopher Rungkat (first round)
4. (Poland) Karol Drzewiecki / (Poland) Piotr Matuszewski (first round)

== Draw ==
=== Key ===
- Q = Qualifier
- WC = Wild card
- LL = Lucky loser
- Alt = Alternate
- ITF = ITF entry
- PR = Protected ranking
- SR = Special ranking
- SE = Special exempt
- JE = Junior exempt
- JR = Junior Accelerator Programme entrant
- CO = College Accelerator Programme entrant
- NG = Next Gen Accelerator Program entrant
- w/o = Walkover
- r = Retired
- d = Defaulted

First round
1	(Netherlands) S Arends (Netherlands) D Pel	6	4	[10]
(Italy) R Bonadio (Ukraine) V Sachko	1	6	[5]
(Italy) F Forti (Italy) G Zeppieri	6	6
(Netherlands) J Sels; A Vatutin	1	4
4	(Poland) K Drzewiecki (Poland) P Matuszewski	3	4
(Italy) F Cobolli (Italy) M Gigante	6	6
(Austria) D Pichler (Greece) Pe Tsitsipas	6	2	[10]
(Germany) T Handel (Switzerland) Yannik Steinegger	4	6	[5]
WC	(Italy) M Donati (Italy) Simone Rivoira	0	2
(France) G Blancaneaux (France) A Müller	6	6
(Germany) H Jebens (Germany) Niklas Schell	7	6
3	(Philippines) R Gonzales (Indonesia) C Rungkat	5	2
(France) T Droguet (France) Matthieu Perchicot	2	4
(Italy) M Arnaldi (Italy) F Passaro	6	6
WC	(Italy) Matteo Civarolo (Italy) G Mager	6	2	[7]
2	(Switzerland) L Margaroli (Austria) L Miedler	4	6	[10]

Quarterfinals
1	(Netherlands) S Arends (Netherlands) D Pel	4	6	[7]
(Italy) F Forti (Italy) G Zeppieri	6	3	[10]
(Italy) F Cobolli (Italy) M Gigante	6	6
(Austria) D Pichler (Greece) Pe Tsitsipas	4	4
(France) G Blancaneaux (France) A Müller	6	6^{6}	[10]
(Germany) H Jebens (Germany) N Schell	4	7^{8}	[8]
(Italy) M Arnaldi (Italy) F Passaro	6	7^{7}
2	(Switzerland) L Margaroli (Austria) L Miedler	2	6^{4}

Semifinals
(Italy) F Forti (Italy) G Zeppieri	1	4
(Italy) F Cobolli (Italy) M Gigante	6	6
(France) G Blancaneaux (France) A Müller	6	6
(Italy) M Arnaldi (Italy) F Passaro	2	3

Final
(Italy) F Cobolli (Italy) M Gigante	6	3	[9]
(France) G Blancaneaux (France) A Müller	4	6	[11]
