= 2022 Sanremo Challenger – Singles =

Singles
- 2022 Sanremo Challenger

Final
- Champion: (Denmark) Holger Rune
- Runner-up: (Italy) Francesco Passaro
- Score: 6–1, 2–6, 6–4

Events
Singles	Doubles
← 2010 ·	Sanremo Challenger	· 2023 →

This was the first edition of the tournament since it was discontinued in 2011.

Holger Rune won the title after defeating Francesco Passaro 6–1, 2–6, 6–4 in the final.

== Seeds ==
1. (Denmark) Holger Rune (champion)
2. (Italy) Gianluca Mager (semifinals)
3. (Moldova) Radu Albot (second round)
4. (France) Pierre-Hugues Herbert (first round)
5. (France) Hugo Grenier (first round)
6. (Italy) Flavio Cobolli (first round)
7. (Italy) Thomas Fabbiano (quarterfinals)
8. (France) Alexandre Müller (second round)

== Draw ==
=== Key ===
- Q = Qualifier
- WC = Wild card
- LL = Lucky loser
- Alt = Alternate
- SE = Special exempt
- PR = Protected ranking
- ITF = ITF entry
- JE = Junior exempt
- w/o = Walkover
- r = Retired
- d = Defaulted
- SR = Special ranking

=== Finals ===
Semifinals
1	(Denmark) Holger Rune	6	6
(Italy) Andrea Arnaboldi	4	1
Q	(Italy) Francesco Passaro	6	6
2	(Italy) Gianluca Mager	1	1

Final
1	(Denmark) Holger Rune	6	2	6
Q	(Italy) Francesco Passaro	1	6	4

=== Top half ===
First round
1	(Denmark) H Rune	6	7^{14}
E Tiurnev	3	6^{12}
(Italy) G Zeppieri	4	2
(Bosnia and Herzegovina) N Fatić	6	6
(France) G Blancaneaux	3	0^{r}
Q	(France) M Martineau	6	4
WC	(Italy) M Gigante	2	6	6
6	(Italy) F Cobolli	6	4	3
4	(France) P-H Herbert	6	3	3
(Serbia) M Zekić	4	6	6
(Netherlands) R Haase	5	6	2
A Vatutin	7	2	6
WC	(Italy) M Arnaldi	5	5
(Italy) R Bonadio	7	7
(Italy) A Arnaboldi	6	6
5	(France) H Grenier	3	2

Second round
1	(Denmark) H Rune	6	6
(Bosnia and Herzegovina) N Fatić	3	2
Q	(France) M Martineau	3	5
WC	(Italy) M Gigante	6	7
(Serbia) M Zekić	7	2	4
A Vatutin	5	6	6
(Italy) R Bonadio	6	2	3
(Italy) A Arnaboldi	4	6	6

Quarterfinals
1	(Denmark) H Rune	6	6
WC	(Italy) M Gigante	3	0
A Vatutin	2	6	6^{7}
(Italy) A Arnaboldi	6	3	7^{9}

Semifinals
1	(Denmark) H Rune	6	6
(Italy) A Arnaboldi	4	1

=== Bottom half ===
First round
8	(France) A Müller	6	6
(Austria) L Miedler	3	4
(Croatia) B Gojo	4	2
Q	(Italy) F Passaro	6	6
Q	(Hungary) M Valkusz	6	6
WC	(Italy) M Donati	1	2
Q	(Uzbekistan) K Sultanov	2	6	1
3	(Moldova) R Albot	6	3	6
7	(Italy) T Fabbiano	7	1	6
(Netherlands) J Sels	5	6	2
(Ukraine) V Sachko	6	6
Q	(Italy) Edoardo Lavagno	3	4
Q	(Monaco) V Vacherot	1	7^{7}	6^{2}
E Karlovskiy	6	6^{5}	7^{7}
(Italy) F Forti	2	4
2	(Italy) G Mager	6	6

Second round
8	(France) A Müller	1	2
Q	(Italy) F Passaro	6	6
Q	(Hungary) M Valkusz	6	1	6
3	(Moldova) R Albot	3	6	2
7	(Italy) T Fabbiano	7	3	7
(Ukraine) V Sachko	5	6	5
E Karlovskiy	1	4
2	(Italy) G Mager	6	6

Quarterfinals
Q	(Italy) F Passaro	4	6	6
Q	(Hungary) M Valkusz	6	3	2
7	(Italy) T Fabbiano	4	3
2	(Italy) G Mager	6	6

Semifinals
Q	(Italy) F Passaro	6	6
2	(Italy) G Mager	1	1
