= 2022 Internationaux de Tennis de Blois – Singles =

Singles
- 2022 Internationaux de Tennis de Blois

Final
- Champion: (France) Alexandre Müller
- Runner-up: (Serbia) Nikola Milojević
- Score: 7–6^{(7–3)}, 6–1

Events
Singles	Doubles
← 2019 ·	Internationaux de Tennis de Blois	· 2023 →

Pedro Sousa was the defending champion but chose not to defend his title.

Alexandre Müller won the title after defeating Nikola Milojević 7–6^{(7–3)}, 6–1 in the final.

== Seeds ==
1. (Czech Republic) Zdeněk Kolář (first round)
2. (France) Corentin Moutet (first round)
3. (Argentina) Camilo Ugo Carabelli (second round)
4. (Argentina) Pedro Cachin (first round)
5. (Czech Republic) Vít Kopřiva (semifinals)
6. (Austria) Dennis Novak (second round)
7. (Serbia) Nikola Milojević (final)
8. (Croatia) Nino Serdarušić (second round)

== Draw ==
=== Key ===
- Q = Qualifier
- WC = Wild card
- LL = Lucky loser
- Alt = Alternate
- SE = Special exempt
- PR = Protected ranking
- ITF = ITF entry
- JE = Junior exempt
- w/o = Walkover
- r = Retired
- d = Defaulted
- SR = Special ranking

=== Finals ===
Semifinals
7	(Serbia) Nikola Milojević	7^{7}	6
5	(Czech Republic) Vít Kopřiva	6^{1}	2
(France) Alexandre Müller	7^{7}	6
Q	(France) Luca Van Assche	6^{4}	3

Final
7	(Serbia) Nikola Milojević	6^{3}	1
(France) Alexandre Müller	7^{7}	6

=== Top half ===
First round
1	(Czech Republic) Z Kolař	2	4
Q	E Karlovskiy	6	6
(Italy) M Arnaldi	6	6
(France) E Couacaud	4	2
(Kazakhstan) T Skatov	6	7^{7}
(Argentina) F Díaz Acosta	4	6^{2}
(France) G Barrère	1	0
7	(Serbia) N Milojević	6	6
4	(Argentina) P Cachin	4	2
(Germany) M Marterer	6	6
Q	(United States) A Rybakov	6	7
(Hungary) Z Piros	3	5
WC	(France) A Fils	2	6	2
(United States) Em Nava	6	3	6
(Italy) L Giustino	6	4	6^{5}
5	(Czech Republic) V Kopřiva	2	6	7^{7}

Second round
Q	E Karlovskiy	2	7^{7}	6
(Italy) M Arnaldi	6	6^{4}	4
(Kazakhstan) T Skatov	6	4	4
7	(Serbia) N Milojević	4	6	6
(Germany) M Marterer	6	7^{7}
Q	(United States) A Rybakov	3	6^{4}
(United States) Em Nava	1	4
5	(Czech Republic) V Kopřiva	6	6

Quarterfinals
Q	E Karlovskiy	1	6	2
7	(Serbia) N Milojević	6	4	6
(Germany) M Marterer	5	3
5	(Czech Republic) V Kopřiva	7	6

Semifinals
7	(Serbia) N Milojević	7^{7}	6
5	(Czech Republic) V Kopřiva	6^{1}	2

=== Bottom half ===
First round
6	(Austria) D Novak	6	7^{7}
WC	(France) T Atmane	4	6^{4}
Q	(Japan) S Mochizuki	6	4	2
Alt	(Argentina) GA Olivieri	3	6	6
(Argentina) A Collarini	7^{7}	6^{7}	4
(France) A Müller	6^{4}	7^{9}	6
Q	(Brazil) G Décamps	2	3
3	(Argentina) C Ugo Carabelli	6	6
8	(Croatia) N Serdarušić	6	7^{7}
Alt	(Chile) G Lama	3	6^{4}
(Germany) C-M Stebe	2	3
Q	(Spain) N Sánchez Izquierdo	6	6
A Shevchenko	6^{5}	2
Q	(France) L Van Assche	7^{7}	6
(France) E Furness	6	0	6
2/WC	(France) C Moutet	4	6	1

Second round
6	(Austria) D Novak	2	4
Alt	(Argentina) GA Olivieri	6	6
(France) A Müller	6^{5}	6	6
3	(Argentina) C Ugo Carabelli	7^{7}	4	1
8	(Croatia) N Serdarušić	3	2
Q	(Spain) N Sánchez Izquierdo	6	6
Q	(France) L Van Assche	2	6	6
(France) E Furness	6	4	3

Quarterfinals
Alt	(Argentina) GA Olivieri	1	1
(France) A Müller	6	6
Q	(Spain) N Sánchez Izquierdo	4	6^{4}
Q	(France) L Van Assche	6	7^{7}

Semifinals
(France) A Müller	7^{7}	6
Q	(France) L Van Assche	6^{4}	3
