= 2023 Estoril Open =

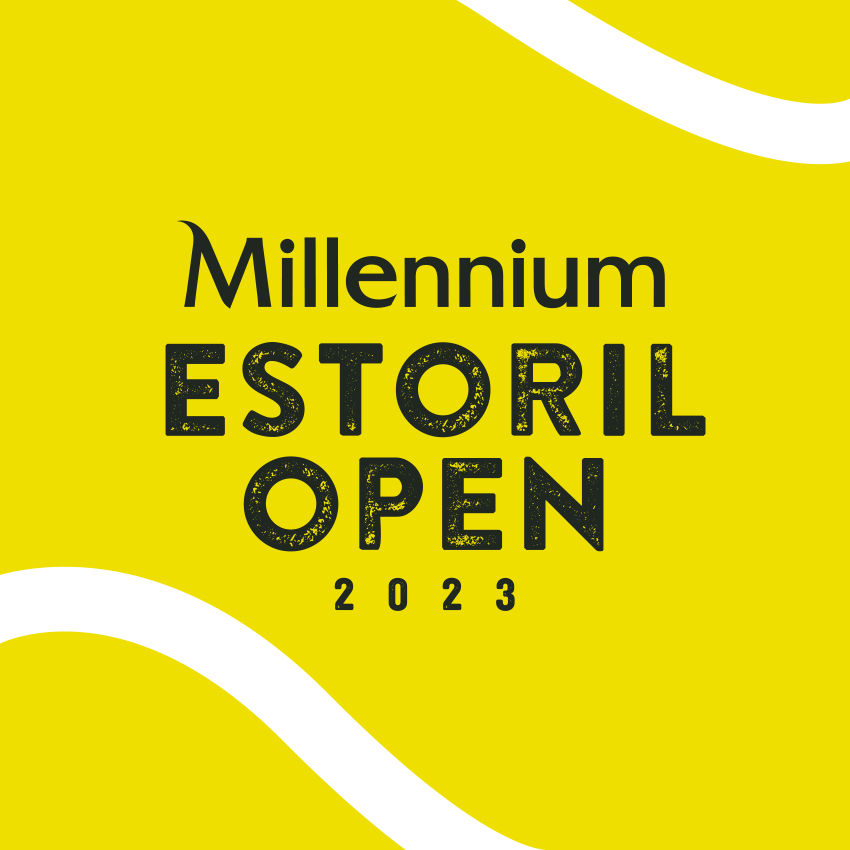
- Date: 3 – 9 April
- Edition: 8th
- Category: ATP Tour 250
- Draw: 28S / 16D
- Prize money: €562,815
- Surface: Clay / outdoor
- Location: Cascais, Portugal
- Venue: Clube de Ténis do Estoril

Champions

Singles
- (Norway) Casper Ruud

Doubles
- (Belgium) Sander Gillé / (Belgium) Joran Vliegen
- Estoril Open

The 2023 Estoril Open (also known as the Millennium Estoril Open for sponsorship reasons) was a men's tennis tournament played on outdoor clay courts. It was the 8th edition of the tournament and part of the ATP Tour 250 series of the 2023 ATP Tour. It took place at the Clube de Ténis do Estoril in Cascais, Portugal, from 3 to 9 April 2023.

== Champions ==
=== Singles ===
- (Norway) Casper Ruud def. (Serbia) Miomir Kecmanović, 6–2, 7–6^{(7–3)}

=== Doubles ===
- (Belgium) Sander Gillé / (Belgium) Joran Vliegen def. (Serbia) Nikola Ćaćić / (Serbia) Miomir Kecmanović, 6–3, 6–4

== Points and prize money ==
=== Point distribution ===
Event	W	F	SF	QF	Round of 16	Round of 32	Q	Q2	Q1
Singles	250	150	90	45	20	0	12	6	0
Doubles	250	150	90	45	0	—N/a	—N/a	—N/a	—N/a

=== Prize money ===
Event	W	F	SF	QF	Round of 16	Round of 32	Q2	Q1
Singles	€85,605	€49,940	€29,355	€17,010	€9,880	€6,035	€3,020	€1,645
Doubles*	€29,740	€15,910	€9,330	€5,220	€3,070	—N/a	—N/a	—N/a

_{*per team}

== Singles main draw entrants ==
=== Seeds ===
Country	Player	Rank^{1}	Seed
NOR	Casper Ruud	4	1
POL	Hubert Hurkacz (Note: Emergency Substitution)	9	2
ESP	Alejandro Davidovich Fokina	25	3
ESP	Roberto Bautista Agut	28	4
ARG	Sebastián Báez	33	5
SRB	Miomir Kecmanović	35	6
ARG	Diego Schwartzman	38	7
USA	Ben Shelton	39	8

- ^{1} Rankings are as of 20 March 2023

=== Other entrants ===
The following players received wildcards into the main draw:

- (Spain) Roberto Bautista Agut
- (United States) Ben Shelton
- (Portugal) João Sousa

The following players received entry as an emergency substitution:

- (Poland) Hubert Hurkacz

The following players received entry from the qualifying draw:

- (Italy) Alessandro Giannessi
- (Austria) Sebastian Ofner
- (Portugal) Henrique Rocha
- (Portugal) Pedro Sousa

=== Withdrawals ===
- (France) Grégoire Barrère → replaced by (Chinese Taipei) Tseng Chun-hsin
- (Spain) Pablo Carreño Busta → replaced by (Austria) Dominic Thiem
- (United States) Sebastian Korda → replaced by (Poland) Hubert Hurkacz
- (Serbia) Dušan Lajović → replaced by (Austria) Jurij Rodionov
- (Finland) Emil Ruusuvuori → replaced by (France) Luca Van Assche
- (Sweden) Mikael Ymer → replaced by (Moldova) Radu Albot

== Doubles main draw entrants ==
=== Seeds ===
Country	Player	Country	Player	Rank^{1}	Seed
GER	Andreas Mies	MON	Hugo Nys	39	1
BRA	Marcelo Melo	AUS	John Peers	84	2
ECU	Gonzalo Escobar	FRA	Fabien Reboul	97	3
BEL	Sander Gillé	BEL	Joran Vliegen	101	4

- Rankings are as of 20 March 2023

=== Other entrants ===
The following pairs received wildcards into the doubles main draw:

- (United States) Ben Shelton / (Portugal) Duarte Vale
- (Portugal) João Sousa / (Austria) Dominic Thiem

=== Withdrawals ===
- (El Salvador) Marcelo Arévalo / (Netherlands) Jean-Julien Rojer → replaced by (Ecuador) Diego Hidalgo / (Colombia) Cristian Rodríguez
- (Bosnia and Herzegovina) Tomislav Brkić / (Ecuador) Gonzalo Escobar → replaced by (Ecuador) Gonzalo Escobar / (France) Fabien Reboul
- (United Kingdom) Lloyd Glasspool / (Finland) Harri Heliövaara → replaced by (Australia) Andrew Harris / (Australia) John-Patrick Smith
- (Germany) Kevin Krawietz / (Germany) Tim Pütz → replaced by (Italy) Marco Cecchinato / (France) Quentin Halys
- (Brazil) Rafael Matos / (Spain) David Vega Hernández → replaced by (Monaco) Romain Arneodo / (Austria) Sam Weissborn
- (United Kingdom) Jamie Murray / (New Zealand) Michael Venus → replaced by (Moldova) Radu Albot / (Romania) Victor Vlad Cornea
- (Monaco) Hugo Nys / (Poland) Jan Zieliński → replaced by (Germany) Andreas Mies / (Monaco) Hugo Nys
