= 2009 Sanremo Tennis Cup – Singles =

Singles
- 2009 Sanremo Tennis Cup

Final
- Champion: (South Africa) Kevin Anderson
- Runner-up: (Slovenia) Blaž Kavčič
- Score: 2–6, 6–2, 7–5

Events
Singles	Doubles
← 2008 ·	Sanremo Tennis Cup	· 2010 →

Diego Junqueira was the defending champion, but he chose not to play this year.
Kevin Anderson won in the final 2–6, 6–2, 7–5, against Blaž Kavčič.

== Seeds ==
1. (Serbia) Ilija Bozoljac (quarterfinals)
2. (Spain) Pere Riba (first round)
3. (Italy) Filippo Volandri (first round)
4. (Netherlands) Jesse Huta Galung (first round)
5. (Italy) Tomas Tenconi (second round)
6. (Spain) Miguel Ángel López Jaén (quarterfinals)
7. (South Africa) Kevin Anderson (champion)
8. (Kazakhstan) Yuri Schukin (semifinals)

== Draw ==
=== Key ===
- Q = Qualifier
- WC = Wild card
- LL = Lucky loser
- Alt = Alternate
- SE = Special exempt
- PR = Protected ranking
- ITF = ITF entry
- JE = Junior exempt
- w/o = Walkover
- r = Retired
- d = Defaulted
- SR = Special ranking

=== Final four ===
Semifinals
8	(Kazakhstan) Yuri Schukin	6	3	1
Q	(Slovenia) Blaž Kavčič	3	6	6
7	(South Africa) Kevin Anderson	7	4	7
WC	(Italy) D Bracciali	6^{6}	6	6^{12}

Final
Q	(Slovenia) Blaž Kavčič	6	2	5
7	(South Africa) Kevin Anderson	2	6	7

=== Top half ===
First round
1	(Serbia) I Bozoljac	6	6
SE	(Croatia) I Dodig	0	2
(Germany) T Kamke	6	6
(Australia) R Smeets	1	0
(Switzerland) M Lammer	7	6
(Canada) P Polansky	5	2
(Italy) S Galvani	5	0	r
8	(Kazakhstan) Y Schukin	7	3
4	(Netherlands) J Huta Galung	1	1
Q	(Slovenia) B Kavčič	6	6
Q	(Argentina) M Alund	6	6
(Italy) R Ghedin	4	1
WC	(Italy) G Petrazzuolo	6	6
Q	(Monaco) B Balleret	2	4
SE	(Czech Republic) J Hájek	1	2
6	(Spain) MÁ López Jaén	6	6

Second round
1	(Serbia) I Bozoljac	6	6
(Germany) T Kamke	4	3
(Switzerland) M Lammer	1	2
8	(Kazakhstan) Y Schukin	6	6
Q	(Slovenia) B Kavčič	7	4	6
Q	(Argentina) M Alund	6^{1}	6	0
WC	(Italy) G Petrazzuolo	1	3
6	(Spain) MÁ López Jaén	6	6

Quarterfinals
1	(Serbia) I Bozoljac	6	6^{3}	0
8	(Kazakhstan) Y Schukin	0	7	6
Q	(Slovenia) B Kavčič	6	6
6	(Spain) MÁ López Jaén	4	1

Semifinals
8	(Kazakhstan) Y Schukin	6	3	4
Q	(Slovenia) B Kavčič	3	6	6

=== Bottom half ===
First round
7	(South Africa) K Anderson	6	6
(Italy) A Stoppini	2	1
(Czech Republic) L Dlouhý	7	7
(Ukraine) S Bubka	6^{5}	5
WC	(Italy) E Fioravante	6^{4}	4
(Germany) A Flock	7	6
(Argentina) JP Brzezicki	6	6^{4}	6
3	(Italy) F Volandri	3	7	4
5	(Italy) T Tenconi	4	6	6
(Romania) A Ungur	6	2	3
Q	(Italy) D Giorgini	6	3	6
WC	(Italy) T Fabbiano	3	6	3
(Austria) M Fischer	3	6	5
(Germany) J Reister	6	4	7
WC	(Italy) D Bracciali	6	6
2	(Spain) P Riba	4	4

Second round
7	(South Africa) K Anderson	6	6
(Czech Republic) L Dlouhý	2	3
(Germany) A Flock	1	2
(Argentina) JP Brzezicki	6	6
5	(Italy) T Tenconi	4	4
Q	(Italy) D Giorgini	6	6
(Germany) J Reister	6	2	4
WC	(Italy) D Bracciali	3	6	6

Quarterfinals
7	(South Africa) K Anderson	6	6
(Argentina) JP Brzezicki	1	1
Q	(Italy) D Giorgini	3	2
WC	(Italy) D Bracciali	6	6

Semifinals
7	(South Africa) K Anderson	7	4	7
WC	(Italy) D Bracciali	6^{6}	6	6^{12}
