= 2010 Sanremo Tennis Cup – Singles =

Singles
- 2010 Sanremo Tennis Cup

Final
- Champion: (Argentina) Gastón Gaudio
- Runner-up: (Argentina) Martín Vassallo Argüello
- Score: 7–5, 6–0

Events
Singles	Doubles
← 2009 ·	Sanremo Tennis Cup	· 2022 →

Kevin Anderson was the defending champion, but chose to compete in Munich instead.
Gastón Gaudio won in the final 7–5, 6–0, against Martín Vassallo Argüello.

== Seeds ==
1. (Russia) Teymuraz Gabashvili (semifinals)
2. (France) David Guez (first round)
3. (Spain) Albert Ramos-Viñolas (semifinals)
4. (Argentina) José Acasuso (second round)
5. (Germany) Tobias Kamke (first round)
6. (France) Laurent Recouderc (quarterfinals)
7. (Argentina) Diego Junqueira (quarterfinals)
8. (Germany) Dominik Meffert (second round)

== Draw ==
=== Key ===
- Q = Qualifier
- WC = Wild card
- LL = Lucky loser
- Alt = Alternate
- SE = Special exempt
- PR = Protected ranking
- ITF = ITF entry
- JE = Junior exempt
- w/o = Walkover
- r = Retired
- d = Defaulted
- SR = Special ranking

=== Finals ===
Semifinals
1	(Russia) Teymuraz Gabashvili	3	4
WC	(Argentina) Gastón Gaudio	6	6
3	(Spain) Albert Ramos-Viñolas	6	3	6^{1}
(Argentina) Martín Vassallo Argüello	4	6	7

Final
WC	(Argentina) Gastón Gaudio	7	6
(Argentina) Martín Vassallo Argüello	5	0

=== Top half ===
First round
1	(Russia) T Gabashvili	6	6
(France) S de Chaunac	2	4
(Austria) P Oswald	6	6
WC	(Italy) M Sattanino	2	4
(Slovakia) D Hrbatý	6^{3}	6	5
WC	(Italy) A Giannessi	7	0	7
(Austria) M Fischer	2	6
6	(France) L Recouderc	6	7
4/WC	(Argentina) J Acasuso	6	6
(France) V Millot	4	4
ALT	(Monaco) B Balleret	7	3	6
(Belarus) U Ignatik	6^{1}	6	3
(Spain) P Clar-Rosselló	6	1	2
WC	(Argentina) G Gaudio	3	6	6
Q	(France) N Renavand	3	6	5
8	(Germany) D Meffert	6	4	7

Second round
1	(Russia) T Gabashvili	6	6
(Austria) P Oswald	3	1
WC	(Italy) A Giannessi	2	2
6	(France) L Recouderc	6	6
4/WC	(Argentina) J Acasuso	2	6	3
ALT	(Monaco) B Balleret	6	3	6
WC	(Argentina) G Gaudio	4	6	6
8	(Germany) D Meffert	6	3	2

Quarterfinals
1	(Russia) T Gabashvili	6	4	6
6	(France) L Recouderc	4	6	1
ALT	(Monaco) B Balleret	3	1
WC	(Argentina) G Gaudio	6	6

Semifinals
1	(Russia) T Gabashvili	3	4
WC	(Argentina) G Gaudio	6	6

=== Bottom half ===
First round
7	(Argentina) D Junqueira	6	6
Q	(Colombia) JS Cabal	2	0
(France) B Paire	2	6	6^{3}
(Italy) F Aldi	6	0	7
(Argentina) S Decoud	4	6	6^{1}
(Spain) R Bautista-Agut	6	4	7
Q	(United Kingdom) D Smethurst	6	3	2
3	(Spain) A Ramos-Viñolas	4	6	6
5	(Germany) T Kamke	5	4
(Italy) M Crugnola	7	6
(Argentina) M Vassallo Argüello	6	6
(Switzerland) M Lammer	2	3
(Argentina) C Berlocq	4	4
Q	(Italy) D Giorgini	6	6
(Argentina) J-M Aranguren	6	6
2	(France) D Guez	2	0

Second round
7	(Argentina) D Junqueira	7	6
(Italy) F Aldi	6^{1}	4
(Spain) R Bautista-Agut	5	3
3	(Spain) A Ramos-Viñolas	7	6
(Italy) M Crugnola	2	1
(Argentina) M Vassallo Argüello	6	6
Q	(Italy) D Giorgini	2	6	4
(Argentina) J-M Aranguren	6	4	6

Quarterfinals
7	(Argentina) D Junqueira	4	6	2
3	(Spain) A Ramos-Viñolas	6	4	6
(Argentina) M Vassallo Argüello	6	5	6
(Argentina) J-M Aranguren	3	7	4

Semifinals
3	(Spain) A Ramos-Viñolas	6	3	6^{1}
(Argentina) M Vassallo Argüello	4	6	7
