= 2010 Sanremo Tennis Cup – Doubles =

Doubles
- 2010 Sanremo Tennis Cup

Final
- Champions: (Argentina) Diego Junqueira (Argentina) Martín Vassallo Argüello
- Runners-up: (Argentina) Carlos Berlocq (Argentina) Sebastián Decoud
- Score: 2–6, 6–4, [10–8]

Events
Singles	Doubles
← 2009 ·	Sanremo Tennis Cup	· 2022 →

Yuri Schukin and Dmitri Sitak were the defending champions, but they chose not to compete this year.
Diego Junqueira and Martín Vassallo Argüello won in the final 2–6, 6–4, [10–8], against Carlos Berlocq and Sebastián Decoud.

== Seeds ==
1. (Austria) Martin Fischer / (Austria) Philipp Oswald (first round)
2. (United Kingdom) Jamie Delgado / (Australia) Sadik Kadir (quarterfinals)
3. (Russia) Teymuraz Gabashvili / (Russia) Denis Matsukevich (quarterfinals)
4. (Colombia) Juan Sebastián Cabal / (Colombia) Alejandro González (first round)

== Draw ==
=== Key ===
- Q = Qualifier
- WC = Wild card
- LL = Lucky loser
- Alt = Alternate
- SE = Special exempt
- PR = Protected ranking
- ITF = ITF entry
- JE = Junior exempt
- w/o = Walkover
- r = Retired
- d = Defaulted
- SR = Special ranking

=== Draw ===
First round
1	(Austria) M Fischer (Austria) P Oswald	6^{4}	6	[2]
(Argentina) D Junqueira (Argentina) M Vassallo Argüello	7	2	[10]
(Spain) R Bautista-Agut (Belarus) U Ignatik	6	6
WC	(Italy) C Borroni (Italy) M Crugnola	4	3
4	(Colombia) JS Cabal (Colombia) A González	6	4	[6]
(Switzerland) G Bastl (Spain) P Clar-Rosselló	1	6	[10]
WC	(Italy) F Gaio (Italy) A Giannessi	6	7
(Australia) J Millman (United Kingdom) D Smethurst	3	5
WC	(Monaco) G Couillard (Monaco) T Oger
(France) O Charroin (France) V Stouff	w/o
(Monaco) B Balleret (France) B Paire	1	1
3	(Russia) T Gabashvili (Russia) D Matsukevich	6	6
(Italy) F Aldi (Italy) D Giorgini	7	2	[8]
(Argentina) C Berlocq (Argentina) S Decoud	6^{2}	6	[10]
(Germany) T Kamke (Germany) D Meffert	6^{4}	1
2	(United Kingdom) J Delgado (Australia) S Kadir	7	6

Quarterfinals
(Argentina) D Junqueira (Argentina) M Vassallo Argüello	6	2	[10]
(Spain) R Bautista-Agut (Belarus) U Ignatik	2	6	[7]
(Switzerland) G Bastl (Spain) P Clar-Rosselló	5	4
WC	(Italy) F Gaio (Italy) A Giannessi	7	6
(France) O Charroin (France) V Stouff	6	6
3	(Russia) T Gabashvili (Russia) D Matsukevich	4	3
(Argentina) C Berlocq (Argentina) S Decoud	6	6
2	(United Kingdom) J Delgado (Australia) S Kadir	3	4

Semifinals
(Argentina) D Junqueira (Argentina) M Vassallo Argüello	6	3	[10]
WC	(Italy) F Gaio (Italy) A Giannessi	3	6	[7]
(France) O Charroin (France) V Stouff	6^{2}	6^{2}
(Argentina) C Berlocq (Argentina) S Decoud	7	7

Finals
(Argentina) D Junqueira (Argentina) M Vassallo Argüello	2	6	[10]
(Argentina) C Berlocq (Argentina) S Decoud	6	4	[8]
