= 2009 Sanremo Tennis Cup – Doubles =

Doubles
- 2009 Sanremo Tennis Cup

Final
- Champions: (Kazakhstan) Yuri Schukin (Russia) Dmitri Sitak
- Runners-up: (Italy) Daniele Bracciali (Italy) Giancarlo Petrazzuolo
- Score: 6–4, 7–6(4)

Events
Singles	Doubles
← 2008 ·	Sanremo Tennis Cup	· 2010 →

Harel Levy and Jim Thomas were the defenders of championship title.
Yuri Schukin and Dmitri Sitak defeated 6–4, 7–6(4) Daniele Bracciali and Giancarlo Petrazzuolo in the final.

== Seeds ==
1. (Jamaica) Dustin Brown / (Italy) Alessandro Motti (first round)
2. (France) Olivier Charroin / (India) Purav Raja (first round)
3. (Ukraine) Sergei Bubka / (Ukraine) Denys Molchanov (first round)
4. (United Kingdom) James Auckland / (Brazil) Márcio Torres (quarterfinals)

== Last matches ==
=== Key ===
- Q = Qualifier
- WC = Wild card
- LL = Lucky loser
- Alt = Alternate
- SE = Special exempt
- PR = Protected ranking
- ITF = ITF entry
- JE = Junior exempt
- w/o = Walkover
- r = Retired
- d = Defaulted
- SR = Special ranking

=== Semifinals and final ===
Semifinals
(Kazakhstan) Yuri Schukin (Russia) Dmitri Sitak	7	7
(Italy) Simone Vagnozzi (Italy) Filippo Volandri	6^{4}	6^{5}
WC	(Italy) Daniele Bracciali (Italy) Giancarlo Petrazzuolo	6	6
(Poland) Tomasz Bednarek (Netherlands) Boy Westerhof	4	3

Finals
(Kazakhstan) Yuri Schukin (Russia) Dmitri Sitak	6	7
WC	(Italy) Daniele Bracciali (Italy) Giancarlo Petrazzuolo	4	6^{4}
