= 2026 Estoril Open – Doubles =

Doubles
- 2026 Estoril Open

Final
- Champions: (France) Titouan Droguet (France) Kyrian Jacquet
- Runners-up: (Brazil) Orlando Luz (Brazil) Rafael Matos
- Score: 7–6^{(7–2)}, 6–7^{(4–7)}, [11–9]

Events
Singles	Doubles
- Estoril Open

Titouan Droguet and Kyrian Jacquet defeated Orlando Luz and Rafael Matos in the final, 7–6^{(7–2)}, 6–7^{(4–7)}, [11–9] to win the doubles tennis title at the 2026 Estoril Open. It was the first ATP Tour title for both players.

Ariel Behar and Joran Vliegen were the reigning champions, but did not participate this year.

== Seeds ==
1. (United Kingdom) Luke Johnson / (Poland) Jan Zieliński (first round)
2. (Brazil) Orlando Luz / (Brazil) Rafael Matos (final)
3. (Netherlands) Sander Arends / (Netherlands) David Pel (semifinals)
4. (United States) Vasil Kirkov / (Netherlands) Bart Stevens (quarterfinals)

== Draw ==
Key

- Q = Qualifier
- WC = Wild card
- LL = Lucky loser
- Alt = Alternate
- ITF = ITF entry
- PR = Protected ranking
- SR = Special ranking
- SE = Special exempt
- JE = Junior exempt
- JR = Junior Accelerator Programme entrant
- CO = College Accelerator Programme entrant
- NG = Next Gen Accelerator Program entrant
- w/o = Walkover
- r = Retired
- d = Defaulted

=== Draw ===
First round
1	(United Kingdom) L Johnson (Poland) J Zieliński	6^{3}	1
Alt	(France) T Droguet (France) K Jacquet	7^{7}	6
(Mexico) S González (Mexico) MÁ Reyes-Varela	6	6
WC	(Portugal) F Ferreira Silva (Portugal) T Pereira	1	4
4	(United States) V Kirkov (Netherlands) B Stevens	6	3	[10]
(Brazil) M Demoliner (United States) R Galloway	2	6	[7]
(Portugal) N Borges (Portugal) F Cabral	7^{7}	7^{7}
(France) A Reymond (France) L Sanchez	6^{4}	6^{0}
(Ecuador) D Hidalgo (Chile) A Tabilo	6	7
(South Korea) J-s Nam (Japan) T Yuzuki	3	5
(United Kingdom) D Stevenson (United Kingdom) M Willis	3	7^{7}	[6]
3	(Netherlands) S Arends (Netherlands) D Pel	6	6^{1}	[10]
Alt	(Portugal) J Domingues (Portugal) T Torres	1	6	[10]
WC	(Portugal) J Faria (Portugal) H Rocha	6	3	[8]
(Chinese Taipei) R Ho (United States) B Kittay	6^{4}	2
2	(Brazil) O Luz (Brazil) R Matos	7^{7}	6

Quarterfinals
Alt	(France) T Droguet (France) K Jacquet	6	6
(Mexico) S González (Mexico) MÁ Reyes-Varela	4	3
4	(United States) V Kirkov (Netherlands) B Stevens	2	3
(Portugal) N Borges (Portugal) F Cabral	6	6
(Ecuador) D Hidalgo (Chile) A Tabilo	6	3	[7]
3	(Netherlands) S Arends (Netherlands) D Pel	2	6	[10]
Alt	(Portugal) J Domingues (Portugal) T Torres	4	2
2	(Brazil) O Luz (Brazil) R Matos	6	6

Semifinals
Alt	(France) T Droguet (France) K Jacquet	6^{6}	6	[11]
(Portugal) N Borges (Portugal) F Cabral	7^{8}	4	[9]
3	(Netherlands) S Arends (Netherlands) D Pel	6	4	[6]
2	(Brazil) O Luz (Brazil) R Matos	4	6	[10]

Final
Alt	(France) T Droguet (France) K Jacquet	7^{7}	6^{4}	[11]
2	(Brazil) O Luz (Brazil) R Matos	6^{2}	7^{7}	[9]
