= 2023 Estoril Open – Doubles =

Doubles
- 2023 Estoril Open

Final
- Champions: (Belgium) Sander Gillé (Belgium) Joran Vliegen
- Runners-up: (Serbia) Nikola Ćaćić (Serbia) Miomir Kecmanović
- Score: 6–3, 6–4

Events
Singles	Doubles
- Estoril Open

Sander Gillé and Joran Vliegen defeated Nikola Ćaćić and Miomir Kecmanović in the final, 6–3, 6–4 to win the doubles tennis title at the 2023 Estoril Open. It was their seventh title together as a team and their second of the season.

Nuno Borges and Francisco Cabral were the defending champions, but lost in the semifinals to Gillé and Vliegen.

== Seeds ==
1. (Germany) Andreas Mies / (Monaco) Hugo Nys (first round)
2. (Brazil) Marcelo Melo / (Australia) John Peers (first round)
3. (Ecuador) Gonzalo Escobar / (France) Fabien Reboul (semifinals)
4. (Belgium) Sander Gillé / (Belgium) Joran Vliegen (champions)

== Draw ==
Key

- Q = Qualifier
- WC = Wild card
- LL = Lucky loser
- Alt = Alternate
- ITF = ITF entry
- PR = Protected ranking
- SR = Special ranking
- SE = Special exempt
- JE = Junior exempt
- JR = Junior Accelerator Programme entrant
- CO = College Accelerator Programme entrant
- NG = Next Gen Accelerator Program entrant
- w/o = Walkover
- r = Retired
- d = Defaulted

=== Draw ===
First round
1	(Germany) A Mies (Monaco) H Nys	6^{4}	1
(Netherlands) R Haase (Austria) P Oswald	7^{7}	6
(Monaco) R Arneodo (Austria) S Weissborn	3	6^{3}
(Portugal) N Borges (Portugal) F Cabral	6	7^{7}
4	(Belgium) S Gillé (Belgium) J Vliegen	3	6	[10]
(Argentina) P Cachin (Spain) B Zapata Miralles	6	3	[5]
(Colombia) N Barrientos (Uruguay) A Behar	5	6	[7]
(Moldova) R Albot (Romania) VV Cornea	7	4	[10]
WC	(United States) B Shelton (Portugal) D Vale	4	2
WC	(Portugal) J Sousa (Austria) D Thiem	6	6
(Italy) M Cecchinato (France) Q Halys	0	3
3	(Ecuador) G Escobar (France) F Reboul	6	6
(Australia) A Harris (Australia) J-P Smith	2	4
(Serbia) N Ćaćić (Serbia) M Kecmanović	6	6
(Ecuador) D Hidalgo (Colombia) C Rodríguez	7^{7}	6^{7}	[10]
2	(Brazil) M Melo (Australia) J Peers	6^{5}	7^{9}	[6]

Quarterfinals
(Netherlands) R Haase (Austria) P Oswald	3	6^{4}
(Portugal) N Borges (Portugal) F Cabral	6	7^{7}
4	(Belgium) S Gillé (Belgium) J Vliegen	w/o
(Moldova) R Albot (Romania) VV Cornea
WC	(Portugal) J Sousa (Austria) D Thiem	3	2
3	(Ecuador) G Escobar (France) F Reboul	6	6
(Serbia) N Ćaćić (Serbia) M Kecmanović	4	7^{7}	[10]
(Ecuador) D Hidalgo (Colombia) C Rodríguez	6	6^{5}	[4]

Semifinals
(Portugal) N Borges (Portugal) F Cabral	6^{4}	6^{4}
4	(Belgium) S Gillé (Belgium) J Vliegen	7^{7}	7^{7}
3	(Ecuador) G Escobar (France) F Reboul	2	6	[3]
(Serbia) N Ćaćić (Serbia) M Kecmanović	6	1	[10]

Final
4	(Belgium) S Gillé (Belgium) J Vliegen	6	6
(Serbia) N Ćaćić (Serbia) M Kecmanović	3	4
