= 2009 Sanremo Tennis Cup =

- Date: May 4–10, 2009
- Edition: 8th
- Location: Sanremo, Italy

Champions

Singles
- (South Africa) Kevin Anderson

Doubles
- (Kazakhstan) Yuri Schukin / (Russia) Dmitri Sitak
← 2008 ·	Sanremo Tennis Cup	· 2010 →

The 2009 Sanremo Tennis Cup was a professional tennis tournament played on red clay courts. It was part of the 2009 ATP Challenger Tour. It took place in Sanremo, Italy between May 4 and May 10, 2009.

== Singles entrants ==
=== Seeds ===
Nationality	Player	Ranking*	Seeding
SRB	Ilija Bozoljac	136	1
ESP	Pere Riba	145	2
ITA	Filippo Volandri	149	3
NED	Jesse Huta Galung	153	4
ITA	Tomas Tenconi	156	5
ESP	Miguel Ángel López Jaén	171	6
RSA	Kevin Anderson	171	7
KAZ	Yuri Schukin	177	8

- Rankings are as of April 27, 2009.

=== Other entrants ===
The following players received wildcards into the singles main draw:

- (Italy) Daniele Bracciali
- (Italy) Thomas Fabbiano
- (Italy) Enrico Fioravante
- (Italy) Giancarlo Petrazzuolo

The following players received entry from the qualifying draw:

- (Argentina) Martín Alund
- (Monaco) Benjamin Balleret
- (Italy) Daniele Giorgini
- (Slovenia) Blaž Kavčič

The following players received special exempt into the singles main draw:

- (Croatia) Ivan Dodig
- (Czech Republic) Jan Hájek

== Champions ==
=== Singles ===
(South Africa) Kevin Anderson def. (Slovenia) Blaž Kavčič, 2–6, 6–2, 7–5.

=== Doubles ===
(Kazakhstan) Yuri Schukin / (Russia) Dmitri Sitak def. (Italy) Daniele Bracciali / (Italy) Giancarlo Petrazzuolo, 6–4, 7–6(4).
