= 2023 Estoril Open – Singles =

Singles
- 2023 Estoril Open

Final
- Champion: (Norway) Casper Ruud
- Runner-up: (Serbia) Miomir Kecmanović
- Score: 6–2, 7–6^{(7–3)}

Details
- Draw: 28 (4 Q / 3 WC )
- Seeds: 8

Events
Singles	Doubles
← 2022 ·	Estoril Open	· 2024 →

Casper Ruud defeated Miomir Kecmanović in the final, 6–2, 7–6^{(7–3)} to win the singles tennis title at the 2023 Estoril Open. The victory marked Ruud's tenth career singles title and his first of the season. Kecmanović was bidding to secure his second career singles title.

Sebastián Báez was the defending champion, but lost in the quarterfinals to Ruud.

== Seeds ==
The top four seeds received a bye into the second round.

1. (Norway) Casper Ruud (champion)
2. (Poland) Hubert Hurkacz (second round)
3. (Spain) Alejandro Davidovich Fokina (quarterfinals)
4. (Spain) Roberto Bautista Agut (second round)
5. (Argentina) Sebastián Báez (quarterfinals)
6. (Serbia) Miomir Kecmanović (final)
7. (Argentina) Diego Schwartzman (first round)
8. (United States) Ben Shelton (second round)

== Draw ==
=== Key ===
- Q = Qualifier
- WC = Wild card
- LL = Lucky loser
- Alt = Alternate
- SE = Special exempt
- PR = Protected ranking
- ITF = ITF entry
- JE = Junior exempt
- w/o = Walkover
- r = Retired
- d = Defaulted
- SR = Special ranking

=== Finals ===
Semifinals
1	(Norway) Casper Ruud	6	3	7^{7}
(France) Quentin Halys	4	6	6^{2}
(Italy) Marco Cecchinato	3	1
6	(Serbia) Miomir Kecmanović	6	6

Final
1	(Norway) Casper Ruud	6	7^{7}
6	(Serbia) Miomir Kecmanović	2	6^{3}

=== Top half ===
First round
(Italy) G Zeppieri	4	6	3
WC	(Portugal) J Sousa	6	1	6
(Argentina) P Cachin	6	6
(Chinese Taipei) C-h Tseng	4	4
(Moldova) R Albot	5	6^{3}
5	(Argentina) S Báez	7	7^{7}
(Portugal) N Borges	3	4
(France) Q Halys	6	6
(Austria) D Thiem	3	6	6
Q	(Austria) S Ofner	6	3	4
(France) C Lestienne	5	5
8/WC	(United States) B Shelton	7	7

Second round
1	(Norway) C Ruud	4	6	6
WC	(Portugal) J Sousa	6	2	2
(Argentina) P Cachin	4	6^{2}
5	(Argentina) S Báez	6	7^{7}
4/WC	(Spain) R Bautista Agut	6^{5}	5
(France) Q Halys	7^{7}	7
(Austria) D Thiem	6	6
8/WC	(United States) B Shelton	2	2

Quarterfinals
1	(Norway) C Ruud	6	6
5	(Argentina) S Báez	3	0
(France) Q Halys	6	6
(Austria) D Thiem	1	4

Semifinals
1	(Norway) C Ruud	6	3	7^{7}
(France) Q Halys	4	6	6^{2}

=== Bottom half ===
First round
7	(Argentina) D Schwartzman	3	6^{8}
(Italy) M Cecchinato	6	7^{10}
Q	(Italy) A Giannessi	2	1
(Italy) F Fognini	6	6
(France) L Van Assche	6^{5}	6	6
Q	(Portugal) P Sousa	7^{7}	3	1
6	(Serbia) M Kecmanović	6	6
(Italy) L Nardi	4	1
(Austria) J Rodionov	3	6	6
(Spain) A Ramos Viñolas	6	1	4
(Spain) B Zapata Miralles	6	6
Q	(Portugal) H Rocha	4	2

Second round
(Italy) M Cecchinato	4	6	6
(Italy) F Fognini	6	3	3
(France) L Van Assche	3	5
3	(Spain) A Davidovich Fokina	6	7
6	(Serbia) M Kecmanović	6	6
(Austria) J Rodionov	0	1
(Spain) B Zapata Miralles	6^{7}	6	6
2	(Poland) H Hurkacz	7^{9}	4	2

Quarterfinals
(Italy) M Cecchinato	7	7^{7}
3	(Spain) A Davidovich Fokina	5	6^{5}
6	(Serbia) M Kecmanović	7	6
(Spain) B Zapata Miralles	5	2

Semifinals
(Italy) M Cecchinato	3	1
6	(Serbia) M Kecmanović	6	6

== Qualifying ==
=== Seeds ===
1. (Hungary) Fábián Marozsán (qualifying competition)
2. (Austria) Sebastian Ofner (qualified)
3. (United Kingdom) Ryan Peniston (first round)
4. (Slovakia) Jozef Kovalík (first round)
5. (Kazakhstan) Timofey Skatov (qualifying competition)
6. (Ukraine) Oleksii Krutykh (first round)
7. (Czech Republic) Dalibor Svrčina (first round)
8. (Bosnia and Herzegovina) Damir Džumhur (first round)

=== Qualifiers ===
1. (Italy) Alessandro Giannessi
2. (Austria) Sebastian Ofner
3. (Portugal) Henrique Rocha
4. (Portugal) Pedro Sousa

=== Qualifying draw ===
==== First qualifier ====
First round
1	(Hungary) Fábián Marozsán	6	6
(France) Manuel Guinard	3	0
(Italy) Alessandro Giannessi	1	7	6
6	(Ukraine) Oleksii Krutykh	6	5	1

Qualifying competition
1	(Hungary) Fábián Marozsán	6	6^{5}	4
(Italy) Alessandro Giannessi	4	7^{7}	6

==== Second qualifier ====
First round
2	(Austria) Sebastian Ofner	6	6
(Netherlands) Robin Haase	3	4
(Portugal) Frederico Ferreira Silva	6	5	6
8	(Bosnia and Herzegovina) Damir Džumhur	1	7	3

Qualifying competition
2	(Austria) Sebastian Ofner	6^{6}	7^{7}	6
(Portugal) Frederico Ferreira Silva	7^{8}	6^{5}	3

==== Third qualifier ====
First round
3	(United Kingdom) Ryan Peniston	4	1
WC	(Portugal) Henrique Rocha	6	6
(Hungary) Máté Valkusz	6	6
7	(Czech Republic) Dalibor Svrčina	0	2

Qualifying competition
WC	(Portugal) Henrique Rocha	6	6
(Hungary) Máté Valkusz	4	2

==== Fourth qualifier ====
First round
4	(Slovakia) Jozef Kovalík	6	5	3
WC	(Portugal) Pedro Sousa	4	7	6
(Bulgaria) Adrian Andreev	1	1^{r}
5	(Kazakhstan) Timofey Skatov	6	3

Qualifying competition
WC	(Portugal) Pedro Sousa	6	6
5	(Kazakhstan) Timofey Skatov	4	4
