= 2023 Sanremo Challenger – Singles =

Singles
- 2023 Sanremo Challenger

Final
- Champion: (France) Luca Van Assche
- Runner-up: (Peru) Juan Pablo Varillas
- Score: 6–1, 6–3

Events
Singles	Doubles
- Sanremo Challenger

Holger Rune was the defending champion but chose not to defend his title.

Luca Van Assche won the title after defeating Juan Pablo Varillas 6–1, 6–3 in the final.

== Seeds ==
1. (Peru) Juan Pablo Varillas (final)
2. (Italy) Marco Cecchinato (first round)
3. Alexander Shevchenko (second round)
4. Aslan Karatsev (first round)
5. (France) Luca Van Assche (champion)
6. (Italy) Matteo Arnaldi (first round)
7. Pavel Kotov (first round, retired)
8. (Italy) Giulio Zeppieri (second round)

== Draw ==
Key

- Q = Qualifier
- WC = Wild card
- LL = Lucky loser
- Alt = Alternate
- ITF = ITF entry
- PR = Protected ranking
- SR = Special ranking
- SE = Special exempt
- JE = Junior exempt
- JR = Junior Accelerator Programme entrant
- CO = College Accelerator Programme entrant
- NG = Next Gen Accelerator Program entrant
- w/o = Walkover
- r = Retired
- d = Defaulted

=== Finals ===
Semifinals
1	(Peru) Juan Pablo Varillas	6	6
Q	(Belgium) Kimmer Coppejans	3	4
5	(France) Luca Van Assche	7^{7}	6
(Czech Republic) Vít Kopřiva	6^{4}	2

Final
1	(Peru) Juan Pablo Varillas	1	3
5	(France) Luca Van Assche	6	6

=== Top half ===
First round
1	(Peru) JP Varillas	6	7^{7}
Q	(Italy) F Arnaboldi	4	6^{1}
(Italy) A Pellegrino	7^{9}	6
WC	(Italy) M Gigante	6^{7}	4
Q	(Monaco) V Vacherot	3	3
Q	(Italy) Edoardo Lavagno	6	6
Q	(Italy) A Vavassori	4	7	4
7	P Kotov	6	5	0^{r}
4	A Karatsev	7	2	3
Q	(Belgium) K Coppejans	5	6	6
(France) M Guinard	2	3
(Austria) S Ofner	6	6
(Slovakia) J Kovalík	6	6
SE	(United Kingdom) B Harris	2	1
(Hungary) Z Piros	6	7^{7}
6	(Italy) M Arnaldi	3	6^{3}

Second round
1	(Peru) JP Varillas	6	1	6
(Italy) A Pellegrino	4	6	1
Q	(Italy) E Lavagno	5	6^{5}
Q	(Italy) A Vavassori	7	7^{7}
Q	(Belgium) K Coppejans	6	7
(Austria) S Ofner	4	5
(Slovakia) J Kovalík	3	6^{6}
(Hungary) Z Piros	6	7^{8}

Quarterfinals
1	(Peru) JP Varillas	3	6	6
Q	(Italy) A Vavassori	6	3	4
Q	(Belgium) K Coppejans	6	6^{2}	7^{7}
(Hungary) Z Piros	1	7^{7}	6^{4}

Semifinals
1	(Peru) JP Varillas	6	6
Q	(Belgium) K Coppejans	3	4

=== Bottom half ===
First round
5	(France) L Van Assche	2	6	6
(United Kingdom) R Peniston	6	3	2
WC	(Italy) G Ferrari	1	6^{2}
Q	(Italy) G Fonio	6	7^{7}
(France) A Müller	1	6	6
(Japan) K Uchida	6	3	3
(Chinese Taipei) C-h Tseng	3	3
3	A Shevchenko	6	6
8	(Italy) G Zeppieri	6	6
SE	(Italy) A Giannessi	1	1
(Italy) L Nardi	4	4
WC	(Italy) G Mager	6	6
(Italy) F Cobolli	6	6
(Italy) F Maestrelli	4	4
(Czech Republic) V Kopřiva	6	6
2	(Italy) M Cecchinato	4	4

Second round
5	(France) L Van Assche	6	6
Q	(Italy) G Fonio	3	3
(France) A Müller	7	6
3	A Shevchenko	5	2
8	(Italy) G Zeppieri	6^{4}	3
WC	(Italy) G Mager	7^{7}	6
(Italy) F Cobolli	3	1
(Czech Republic) V Kopřiva	6	6

Quarterfinals
5	(France) L Van Assche	6	6
(France) A Müller	2	1
WC	(Italy) G Mager	4	3
(Czech Republic) V Kopřiva	6	6

Semifinals
5	(France) L Van Assche	7^{7}	6
(Czech Republic) V Kopřiva	6^{4}	2
