= 2026 Estoril Open – Singles =

Singles
- 2026 Estoril Open

Final
- Champion: (France) Luca Van Assche
- Runner-up: (Belgium) Alexander Blockx
- Score: 6–4, 4–6, 7–5

Events
Singles	Doubles
- Estoril Open

Luca Van Assche defeated Alexander Blockx in the final, 6–4, 4–6, 7–5 to win the singles tennis title at the 2026 Estoril Open. It was his first ATP Tour title, and he entered the top 50 of the ATP rankings for the first time.

Alex Michelsen was the reigning champion, but did not participate this year.

== Seeds ==
The top four seeds received a bye into the second round.

1. Andrey Rublev (quarterfinals)
2. (Italy) Luciano Darderi (semifinals)
3. (Chile) Alejandro Tabilo (second round)
4. (Belgium) Alexander Blockx (final)
5. (Portugal) Nuno Borges (second round)
6. (Netherlands) Botic van de Zandschulp (first round)
7. (Argentina) Camilo Ugo Carabelli (first round)
8. (Spain) Pablo Carreño Busta (second round)

== Draw ==
Key

- Q = Qualifier
- WC = Wild card
- LL = Lucky loser
- Alt = Alternate
- ITF = ITF entry
- PR = Protected ranking
- SR = Special ranking
- SE = Special exempt
- JE = Junior exempt
- JR = Junior Accelerator Programme entrant
- CO = College Accelerator Programme entrant
- NG = Next Gen Accelerator Program entrant
- w/o = Walkover
- r = Retired
- d = Defaulted

=== Finals ===
Semifinals
(France) Luca Van Assche	6	7
(France) Hugo Gaston	4	5
4	(Belgium) Alexander Blockx	5	7^{7}	7^{7}
2	(Italy) Luciano Darderi	7	6^{1}	6^{5}

Final
(France) Luca Van Assche	6	4	7
4	(Belgium) Alexander Blockx	4	6	5

=== Top half ===
First round
LL	(Kazakhstan) T Skatov	1	6	6
(Netherlands) J de Jong	6	4	3
WC	(Portugal) F Ferreira Silva	5	7^{7}	1
(France) L Van Assche	7	6^{4}	6
Alt	(Lithuania) V Gaubas	1	3
8	(Spain) P Carreño Busta	6	6
WC	(Portugal) T Torres	6	6
(Georgia (country)) N Basilashvili	4	2
(France) H Gaston	5
(Bosnia and Herzegovina) D Džumhur	0^{r}
(France) T Droguet	6	3	6
7	(Argentina) C Ugo Carabelli	0	6	4

Second round
1	A Rublev	6	6
LL	(Kazakhstan) T Skatov	1	1
(France) L Van Assche	6	4	6
8	(Spain) P Carreño Busta	3	6	2
3	(Chile) A Tabilo	4	4
WC	(Portugal) T Torres	6	6
(France) H Gaston	6	6
(France) T Droguet	0	3

Quarterfinals
1	A Rublev	6	3	4
(France) L Van Assche	3	6	6
WC	(Portugal) T Torres	3	4
(France) H Gaston	6	6

Semifinals
(France) L Van Assche	6	7
(France) H Gaston	4	5

=== Bottom half ===
First round
5	(Portugal) N Borges	6	6
Q	(Brazil) O Luz	3	3
(Switzerland) S Wawrinka	4	6	3
(Argentina) RA Burruchaga	6	4	6
(Spain) D Mérida	6	1	5
LL	(France) K Jacquet	1	6	7
6	(Netherlands) B van de Zandschulp	3	4
(Portugal) J Faria	6	6
Q	(Peru) G Bueno	6	1	7^{7}
WC	(Portugal) T Pereira	3	6	6^{5}
(Portugal) H Rocha	5	5
Q	(Spain) P Martínez	7	7

Second round
5	(Portugal) N Borges	1	6	3
(Argentina) RA Burruchaga	6	4	6
LL	(France) K Jacquet	6	4	6^{4}
4	(Belgium) A Blockx	3	6	7^{7}
(Portugal) J Faria	6	6
Q	(Peru) G Bueno	2	4
Q	(Spain) P Martínez	0	1
2	(Italy) L Darderi	6	6

Quarterfinals
(Argentina) RA Burruchaga	4	7	4
4	(Belgium) A Blockx	6	5	6
(Portugal) J Faria	6	5	2
2	(Italy) L Darderi	2	7	6

Semifinals
4	(Belgium) A Blockx	5	7^{7}	7^{7}
2	(Italy) L Darderi	7	6^{1}	6^{5}

== Qualifying ==
=== Seeds ===
1. (Lithuania) Vilius Gaubas (moved to main draw)
2. (France) Kyrian Jacquet (qualifying competition, lucky loser)
3. (Italy) Andrea Pellegrino (qualifying competition)
4. (Spain) Pedro Martínez (qualified)
5. (Kazakhstan) Timofey Skatov (qualifying competition, lucky loser)
6. (Bolivia) Juan Carlos Prado Ángelo (first round)
7. (Peru) Gonzalo Bueno (qualified)
8. (France) Clément Tabur (qualifying competition)

=== Qualifiers ===
1. (Brazil) Orlando Luz
2. (Japan) Taro Daniel (withdrew)
3. (Peru) Gonzalo Bueno
4. (Spain) Pedro Martínez

=== Lucky losers ===
1. (France) Kyrian Jacquet
2. (Kazakhstan) Timofey Skatov

=== Qualifying draw ===
==== First qualifier ====
First round
Alt	(Brazil) Orlando Luz	6	3
(Chinese Taipei) Tseng Chun-hsin	3	0^{r}
(Lithuania) Edas Butvilas	6	6^{5}	4
8	(France) Clément Tabur	1	7^{7}	6

Qualifying competition
Alt	(Brazil) Orlando Luz	7	6
8	(France) Clément Tabur	5	3

==== Second qualifier ====
First round
2	(France) Kyrian Jacquet	6	6
WC	(Portugal) Gonçalo da Rosa Castro	1	2
(Japan) Taro Daniel	6	6
6	(Bolivia) Juan Carlos Prado Ángelo	4	2

Qualifying competition
2	(France) Kyrian Jacquet	4	6	3
(Japan) Taro Daniel	6	3	6

==== Third qualifier ====
First round
3	(Italy) Andrea Pellegrino	6	6
WC	(Portugal) João Silva	3	2
Alt	(Portugal) Francisco Rocha	4	4
7	(Peru) Gonzalo Bueno	6	6

Qualifying competition
3	(Italy) Andrea Pellegrino	3	7	4
7	(Peru) Gonzalo Bueno	6	5	6

==== Fourth qualifier ====
First round
4	(Spain) Pedro Martínez	6	6
(Spain) David Jordà Sanchis	0	4
Alt	(Portugal) João Domingues	4	7^{7}	4
5	(Kazakhstan) Timofey Skatov	6	6^{5}	6

Qualifying competition
4	(Spain) Pedro Martínez	6	6
5	(Kazakhstan) Timofey Skatov	3	2
