= 2022 Sanremo Challenger =

- Date: 4–10 April
- Edition: 10th
- Surface: Clay
- Location: Sanremo, Italy

Champions

Singles
- (Denmark) Holger Rune

Doubles
- (France) Geoffrey Blancaneaux / (France) Alexandre Müller
← 2010 ·	Sanremo Challenger	· 2023 →

The 2022 Sanremo Challenger was a professional tennis tournament played on clay courts. It was the tenth edition of the tournament which was part of the 2022 ATP Challenger Tour. It took place in Sanremo, Italy between 4 and 10 April 2022.

== Singles main-draw entrants ==
=== Seeds ===
Country	Player	Rank^{1}	Seed
DEN	Holger Rune	88	1
ITA	Gianluca Mager	99	2
MDA	Radu Albot	117	3
FRA	Pierre-Hugues Herbert	134	4
FRA	Hugo Grenier	154	5
ITA	Flavio Cobolli	165	6
ITA	Thomas Fabbiano	173	7
FRA	Alexandre Müller	209	8

- ^{1} Rankings are as of 21 March 2022.

=== Other entrants ===
The following players received wildcards into the singles main draw:

- (Italy) Matteo Arnaldi
- (Italy) Matteo Donati
- (Italy) Matteo Gigante

The following players received entry from the qualifying draw:

- (Italy) Edoardo Lavagno
- (France) Matteo Martineau
- (Italy) Francesco Passaro
- (Uzbekistan) Khumoyun Sultanov
- (Monaco) Valentin Vacherot
- (Hungary) Máté Valkusz

== Champions ==
=== Singles ===
- (Denmark) Holger Rune def. (Italy) Francesco Passaro 6–1, 2–6, 6–4.

=== Doubles ===
- (France) Geoffrey Blancaneaux / (France) Alexandre Müller def. (Italy) Flavio Cobolli / (Italy) Matteo Gigante 4–6, 6–3, [11–9].
