= 2023 Sanremo Challenger – Doubles =

Doubles
- 2023 Sanremo Challenger

Final
- Champions: (Romania) Victor Vlad Cornea (Croatia) Franko Škugor
- Runners-up: (Serbia) Nikola Ćaćić (Brazil) Marcelo Demoliner
- Score: 6–2, 6–3

Events
Singles	Doubles
- Sanremo Challenger

Geoffrey Blancaneaux and Alexandre Müller were the defending champions but chose not to defend their title.

Victor Vlad Cornea and Franko Škugor won the title after defeating Nikola Ćaćić and Marcelo Demoliner 6–2, 6–3 in the final.

== Seeds ==
1. (Ecuador) Gonzalo Escobar / (France) Fabien Reboul (first round)
2. (Colombia) Nicolás Barrientos / (Uruguay) Ariel Behar (quarterfinals)
3. (Czech Republic) Roman Jebavý / (Czech Republic) Adam Pavlásek (quarterfinals)
4. (Serbia) Nikola Ćaćić / (Brazil) Marcelo Demoliner (final)

== Draw ==
Key

- Q = Qualifier
- WC = Wild card
- LL = Lucky loser
- Alt = Alternate
- ITF = ITF entry
- PR = Protected ranking
- SR = Special ranking
- SE = Special exempt
- JE = Junior exempt
- JR = Junior Accelerator Programme entrant
- CO = College Accelerator Programme entrant
- NG = Next Gen Accelerator Program entrant
- w/o = Walkover
- r = Retired
- d = Defaulted

First round
1	(Ecuador) G Escobar (France) F Reboul	6	4	[10]
WC	(Italy) F Maestrelli (Italy) L Nardi	3	6	[12]
(Austria) N Oberleitner (Austria) P Oswald	6	2	[6]
WC	(Italy) J Ocleppo (Italy) S Travaglia	0	6	[10]
3	(Czech Republic) R Jebavý (Czech Republic) A Pavlásek	6	6
(India) S Balaji (India) J Nedunchezhiyan	3	3
I Liutarevich (Ukraine) V Manafov	6^{3}	6	[8]
(Romania) VV Cornea (Croatia) F Škugor	7^{7}	2	[10]
(Norway) V Durasovic (Ukraine) D Molchanov	2	2
(Germany) C Frantzen (Germany) H Jebens	6	6
(Austria) S Ofner (United Kingdom) R Peniston	6^{2}	6^{6}
4	(Serbia) N Ćaćić (Brazil) M Demoliner	7^{7}	7^{8}
(Italy) A Pellegrino (Italy) A Vavassori	6	4	[7]
(Italy) M Bortolotti (Spain) S Martos Gornés	1	6	[10]
P Kotov (Chinese Taipei) C-h Tseng	5	6	[8]
2	(Colombia) N Barrientos (Uruguay) A Behar	7	3	[10]

Quarterfinals
WC	(Italy) F Maestrelli (Italy) L Nardi	6	6
WC	(Italy) J Ocleppo (Italy) S Travaglia	4	4
3	(Czech Republic) R Jebavý (Czech Republic) A Pavlásek	3	3
(Romania) VV Cornea (Croatia) F Škugor	6	6
(Germany) C Frantzen (Germany) H Jebens	4	6	[8]
4	(Serbia) N Ćaćić (Brazil) M Demoliner	6	3	[10]
(Italy) M Bortolotti (Spain) S Martos Gornés	7^{7}	7^{9}
2	(Colombia) N Barrientos (Uruguay) A Behar	6^{3}	6^{7}

Semifinals
WC	(Italy) F Maestrelli (Italy) L Nardi	4	1
(Romania) VV Cornea (Croatia) F Škugor	6	6
4	(Serbia) N Ćaćić (Brazil) M Demoliner	6	4	[10]
(Italy) M Bortolotti (Spain) S Martos Gornés	2	6	[0]

Final
(Romania) VV Cornea (Croatia) F Škugor	6	6
4	(Serbia) N Ćaćić (Brazil) M Demoliner	2	3
