= 2026 Estoril Open =

- Date: 20 – 26 July
- Edition: 11th
- Category: ATP 250
- Draw: 28S / 16D
- Surface: Clay / outdoor
- Location: Cascais, Portugal
- Venue: Clube de Ténis do Estoril

Champions

Singles
- (France) Luca Van Assche

Doubles
- (France) Titouan Droguet / (France) Kyrian Jacquet
- Estoril Open

The 2026 Estoril Open (also known as the Millennium Estoril Open for sponsorship reasons) was a men's tennis tournament played on outdoor clay courts. It was the 11th edition of the tournament and an ATP 250 event on the 2026 ATP Tour (upgraded from ATP Challenger Tour status in 2025). It took place at the Clube de Ténis do Estoril in Cascais, Portugal, from 20 to 26 July 2026.

== Champions ==
=== Singles ===
- (France) Luca Van Assche def. (Belgium) Alexander Blockx, 6–4, 4–6, 7–5

=== Doubles ===
- (France) Titouan Droguet / (France) Kyrian Jacquet def. (Brazil) Orlando Luz / (Brazil) Rafael Matos, 7–6^{(7–2)}, 6–7^{(4–7)}, [11–9]

== Singles main draw entrants ==
=== Seeds ===
Country	Player	Rank^{1}	Seed
	Andrey Rublev	16	1
ITA	Luciano Darderi	18	2
CHI	Alejandro Tabilo	31	3
BEL	Alexander Blockx	37	4
POR	Nuno Borges	52	5
NED	Botic van de Zandschulp	55	6
ARG	Camilo Ugo Carabelli	58	7
ESP	Pablo Carreño Busta	65	8

- ^{1} Rankings are as of 13 July 2026.

=== Other entrants ===
The following players received wildcards into the main draw:

- (Portugal) Frederico Ferreira Silva
- (Portugal) Tiago Pereira
- (Portugal) Tiago Torres

The following player received entry as an alternate:

- (Lithuania) Vilius Gaubas

The following players received entry from the qualifying draw:

- (Peru) Gonzalo Bueno
- ~~(Japan) Taro Daniel~~
- (Brazil) Orlando Luz
- (Spain) Pedro Martínez

The following players received entry as lucky losers:

- (France) Kyrian Jacquet
- (Kazakhstan) Timofey Skatov

=== Withdrawals ===
- (Italy) Matteo Arnaldi → replaced by (Bosnia and Herzegovina) Damir Džumhur
- (Spain) Alejandro Davidovich Fokina → replaced by (France) Hugo Gaston
- (Poland) Hubert Hurkacz → replaced by (Spain) Daniel Mérida
- (Hungary) Fábián Marozsán → replaced by (Kazakhstan) Timofey Skatov
- (Serbia) Hamad Medjedovic → replaced by (Portugal) Jaime Faria
- (Slovakia) Alex Molčan → replaced by (Georgia (country)) Nikoloz Basilashvili
- (Croatia) Dino Prižmić → replaced by (Lithuania) Vilius Gaubas
- (Norway) Casper Ruud → replaced by (Portugal) Henrique Rocha

== Doubles main draw entrants ==
=== Seeds ===
Country	Player	Country	Player	Rank^{1}	Seed
GBR	Luke Johnson	POL	Jan Zieliński	81	1
BRA	Orlando Luz	BRA	Rafael Matos	86	2
NED	Sander Arends	NED	David Pel	103	3
USA	Vasil Kirkov	NED	Bart Stevens	109	4

- ^{1} Rankings are as of 13 July 2026.

=== Other entrants ===
The following pairs received wildcards into the doubles main draw:

- (Portugal) Jaime Faria / (Portugal) Henrique Rocha
- (Portugal) Frederico Ferreira Silva / (Portugal) Tiago Pereira

The following pairs received entry as alternates:

- (Portugal) João Domingues / (Portugal) Tiago Torres
- (France) Titouan Droguet / (France) Kyrian Jacquet

=== Withdrawals ===
- (Argentina) Román Andrés Burruchaga / (Argentina) Camilo Ugo Carabelli → replaced by (Portugal) João Domingues / (Portugal) Tiago Torres
- (United States) Mac Kiger / (United States) Reese Stalder → replaced by (France) Titouan Droguet / (France) Kyrian Jacquet
