= 2023 Sanremo Challenger =

- Date: 27 March – 2 April
- Edition: 11th
- Surface: Clay
- Location: Sanremo, Italy

Champions

Singles
- (France) Luca Van Assche

Doubles
- (Romania) Victor Vlad Cornea / (Croatia) Franko Škugor
| ← 2022 · | Sanremo Challenger | · 2024 → |

The 2023 Sanremo Challenger was a professional tennis tournament played on clay courts. It was the eleventh edition of the tournament which was part of the 2023 ATP Challenger Tour. It took place in Sanremo, Italy between 27 March and 2 April 2023.

== Singles main-draw entrants ==
=== Seeds ===
| Country | Player | Rank^{1} | Seed |
|---|---|---|---|
| PER | Juan Pablo Varillas | 88 | 1 |
| ITA | Marco Cecchinato | 95 | 2 |
| | Alexander Shevchenko | 101 | 3 |
| | Aslan Karatsev | 107 | 4 |
| FRA | Luca Van Assche | 108 | 5 |
| ITA | Matteo Arnaldi | 116 | 6 |
| | Pavel Kotov | 117 | 7 |
| ITA | Giulio Zeppieri | 124 | 8 |

- ^{1} Rankings are as of 20 March 2023.

=== Other entrants ===
The following players received wildcards into the singles main draw:

- (Italy) Gianmarco Ferrari
- (Italy) Matteo Gigante
- (Italy) Gianluca Mager

The following players received entry into the singles main draw as special exempts:

- (Italy) Alessandro Giannessi
- (United Kingdom) Billy Harris

The following players received entry from the qualifying draw:

- (Italy) Federico Arnaboldi
- (Belgium) Kimmer Coppejans
- (Italy) Giovanni Fonio
- (Italy) Edoardo Lavagno
- (Monaco) Valentin Vacherot
- (Italy) Andrea Vavassori

== Champions ==
=== Singles ===
- (France) Luca Van Assche def. (Peru) Juan Pablo Varillas 6–1, 6–3.

=== Doubles ===
- (Romania) Victor Vlad Cornea / (Croatia) Franko Škugor def. (Serbia) Nikola Ćaćić / (Brazil) Marcelo Demoliner 6–2, 6–3.
