= 2010 Sanremo Tennis Cup =

- Date: May 3–9, 2010
- Edition: 9th
- Location: Sanremo, Italy

Champions

Singles
- (Argentina) Gastón Gaudio

Doubles
- (Argentina) Diego Junqueira / (Argentina) Martín Vassallo Argüello
← 2009 ·	Sanremo Tennis Cup	· 2022 →

The 2010 Sanremo Tennis Cup was a professional tennis tournament played on red clay courts. It was part of the 2010 ATP Challenger Tour. It took place in Sanremo, Italy between May 3 and May 9, 2010.

== Entrants ==
=== Seeds ===
Nationality	Player	Ranking*	Seeding
RUS	Teymuraz Gabashvili	114	1
FRA	David Guez	137	2
ESP	Albert Ramos-Viñolas	145	3
ARG	José Acasuso	148	4
GER	Tobias Kamke	157	5
FRA	Laurent Recouderc	159	6
ARG	Diego Junqueira	167	7
GER	Dominik Meffert	175	8

- Rankings are as of April 26, 2010.

=== Other entrants ===
The following players received wildcards into the singles main draw:

- (Argentina) José Acasuso
- (Argentina) Gastón Gaudio
- (Italy) Alessandro Giannessi
- (Italy) Marco Sattanino

The following players received entry from the qualifying draw:

- (Colombia) Juan Sebastián Cabal
- (Italy) Daniele Giorgini
- (France) Nicolas Renavand
- (United Kingdom) Daniel Smethurst

== Champions ==
=== Singles ===
(Argentina) Gastón Gaudio def. (Argentina) Martín Vassallo Argüello, 7–5, 6–0

=== Doubles ===
(Argentina) Diego Junqueira / (Argentina) Martín Vassallo Argüello def. (Argentina) Carlos Berlocq / (Argentina) Sebastián Decoud, 2–6, 6–4, [10–8]
