= Nikola Ćaćić =

Serbian tennis player

Nikola Ćaćić Никола Ћаћић
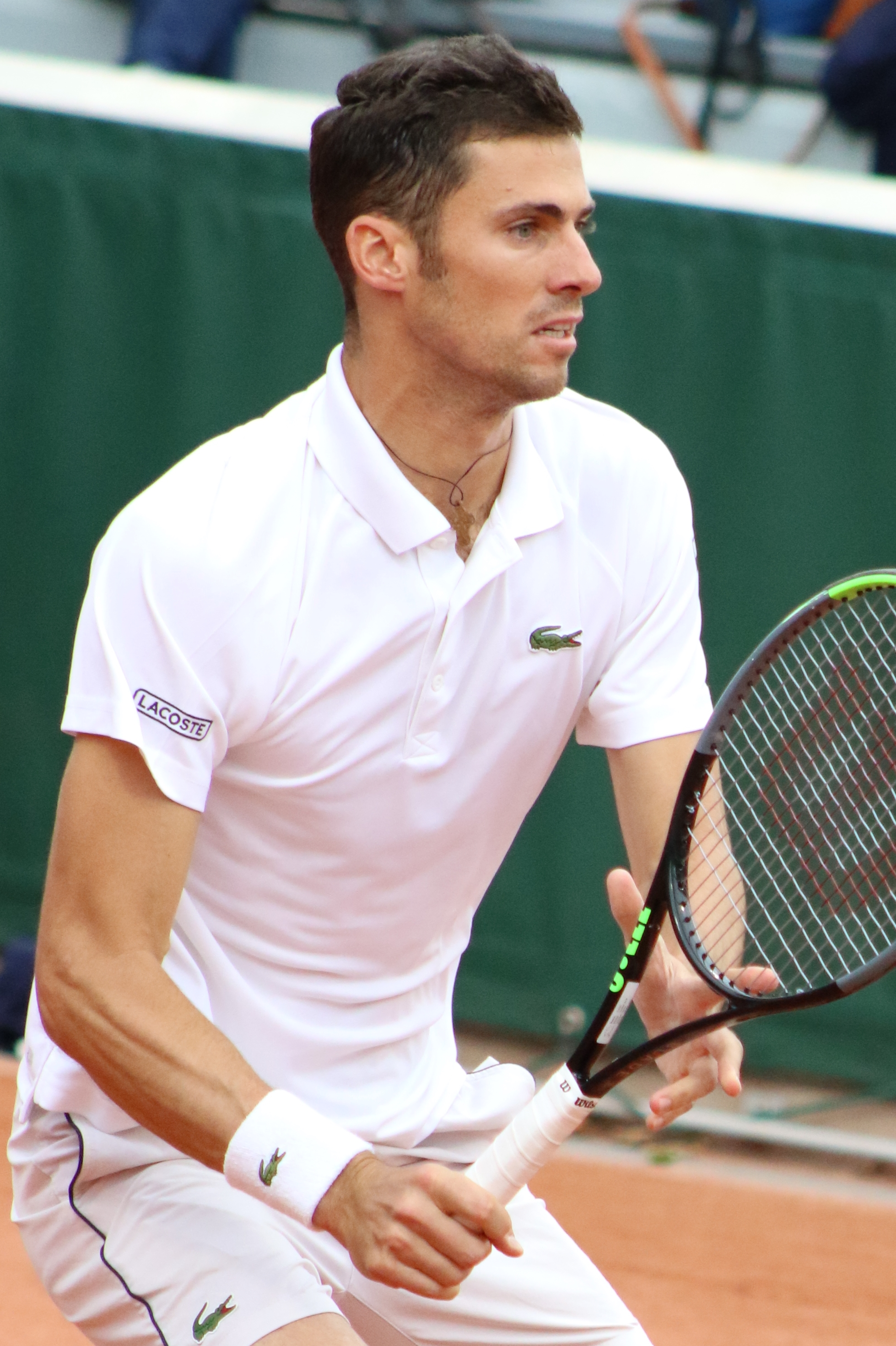
- Ćaćić at the 2021 French Open
- Country (sports): Serbia
- Residence: Belgrade, Serbia
- Born: 7 December 1990 (age 35) Banja Luka, SR Bosnia and Herzegovina, SFR Yugoslavia
- Height: 1.83 m (6 ft 0 in)
- Turned pro: 2007
- Retired: 2024
- Plays: Right-handed (two-handed backhand)
- Coach: Gilbert Schaller (2017–2019); Petar Đukić (2019–2021); Alberto Castellani (2022–2024)
- Prize money: US$1,046,150

Singles
- Career record: 1–1
- Career titles: 0
- Highest ranking: No. 281 (8 September 2014)

Doubles
- Career record: 89–97
- Career titles: 3
- Highest ranking: No. 35 (8 November 2021)

Grand Slam doubles results
- Australian Open: 3R (2023, 2024)
- French Open: QF (2021)
- Wimbledon: 3R (2021)
- US Open: 2R (2021)

Grand Slam mixed doubles results
- Australian Open: 1R (2022)
- Wimbledon: 2R (2022)
- US Open: 2R (2021)

Team competitions
- Davis Cup: 5–5 (Sin. 0–0, Dbs. 5–5)
- Last updated on: 6 January 2025.

Nikola Ćaćić (Serbian Cyrillic: Никола Ћаћић, pronounced [nǐkola t͡ɕât͡ɕit͡ɕ]; born 7 December 1990) (Note: Commonly mistaken as Nikola Čačić.) is a Serbian former professional tennis player. He has a career-high ranking of World No. 35 in doubles achieved on 8 November 2021. He has won three doubles titles in the ATP Tour, four doubles titles in the ATP Challenger Tour, and five singles and 32 doubles titles in ITF Futures tournaments.

== Tennis career ==
=== 2010–2014: Top 300 in singles ===
Ćaćić competed both in singles and doubles events, mainly on ITF Men's Circuit and ATP Challenger Tour level.

Having played with his compatriots, including Marko Djokovic, Ilija Bozoljac and Dušan Lajović, he has taken part in three ATP World Tour main doubles tournaments held in Belgrade (in 2010 and 2012) and Umag (in 2012), where he lost in the opening rounds.

In the summer of 2014, after a series of successful appearances in Challenger tournaments played on a clay surface, Ćaćić moved into the top 300 and achieved his career-high ATP singles ranking of No. 281.

=== 2015 ===
Ćaćić did not participate in any tournament during the 2015 season due to injury, which caused a drop from both world singles and doubles rankings.

=== 2016 ===
He recorded his first win on ATP World Tour level in the first round of Croatia Open, defeating Aljaž Bedene in three sets.

=== 2019: First doubles title and top 100 debut, Serbian No. 1 in doubles ===
In the summer of 2019, he won his first ATP Challenger title at the Shkymkent Challenger with Yang Tsung-hua.

Later that year, he won his first ATP tour level doubles title with his compatriot Dušan Lajović at the Chengdu Open, defeating Jonathan Erlich and Fabrice Martin, 7–6^{(11–9)}, 3–6, [10–3]. As a result, he reached the top 100 on 30 September 2019.

=== 2020: Inaugural ATP Cup champion, Second doubles title ===
In January, he was part of Serbian team that won inaugural 2020 ATP Cup by defeating Spain in the final.

In February, he won his second ATP Tour title in Lyon, partnering Mate Pavić.

=== 2021: Third doubles title, French Open quarterfinal, Three more finals, top 35 ===
He partnered with Tomislav Brkić and won the doubles title at the ATP Buenos Aires, which was only their second tournament as a team. They also reached the finals of Andalucía Open and semifinals at Serbia Open. Following these results, he entered the top 50 in doubles at a career-high ATP doubles ranking of No. 48 on 26 April 2021.

The pair also reached the quarterfinals of the 2021 French Open for their best showing in their careers, defeating Marcel Granollers/Horacio Zeballos and Máximo González/Simone Bolelli en route.

On 8 November 2021, Cacic reached a career high of World No. 35 in doubles.

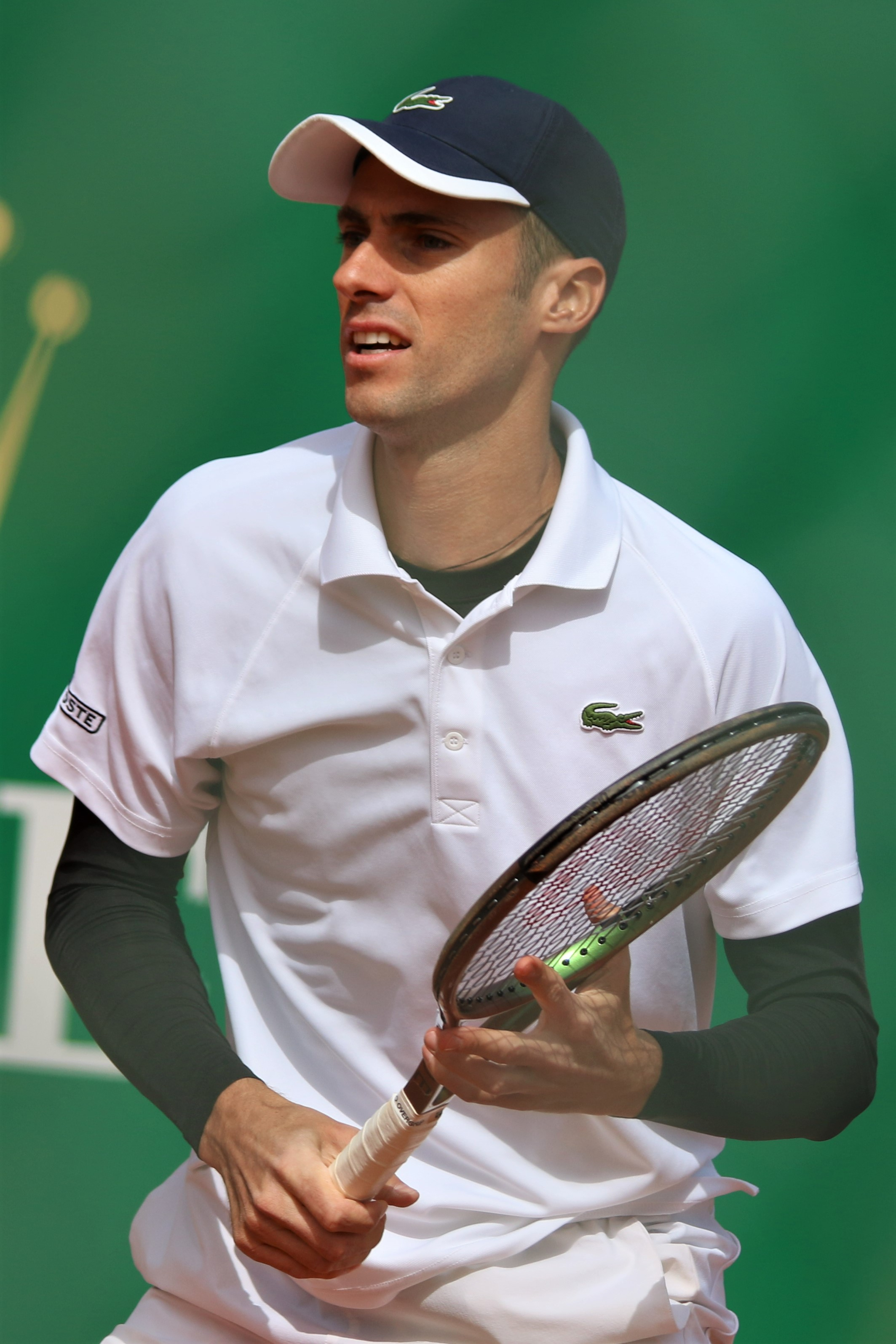
Ćaćić at the 2022 Monte-Carlo Masters

=== 2022: Masters 1000 quarterfinal ===
He reached the quarterfinals at the 2022 Mutua Madrid Open with partner Brkic, losing to eventual champions Wesley Koolhof and Neal Skupski.

=== 2023: Australian Open third round, Davis Cup quarterfinal ===
Partnering Aisam-ul-Haq Qureshi, he reached the third round at the 2023 Australian Open.

In April, partnering Miomir Kecmanović, Cacic reached the final of the 2023 Estoril Open, losing to Sander Gillé and Joran Vliegen.

In July, partnering Victor Vlad Cornea, Cacic reached the semifinals of the Hamburg Open.

In September, during the Davis Cup Finals in Valencia, Cacic partnered with Miomir Kecmanović, and the Serbian Davis Cup team emerged victorious against South Korean pair Song Min-kyu and Nam Ji-sung.

In the tie against Spain, paired again with Kecmanović, they won in straight sets against Alejandro Davidovich Fokina and Marcel Granollers, helping Serbia win the tie 3:0 and reach the Davis Cup quarterfinals.

In October, again partnering Victor Vlad Cornea in Basel as a lucky loser pair, they reached the quarterfinals by defeating Swiss duo Mika Brunold and Marc-Andrea Hüsler in straight sets.

=== 2024: United Cup debut, Win over world No. 1 pair, retirement ===
Partnering with compatriot Dejana Radanović, he made his debut at the 2024 United Cup as part of team Serbia.

At the 2024 Australian Open partnering Denys Molchanov the pair defeated the world No. 1 and No. 2 players, the top seeded pair of Austin Krajicek and Ivan Dodig in the second round to reach the third round for the second time at this Major.

On the last day of 2024, through social media, Ćaćić announced his retirement from professional tennis.

== Performance timelines ==
Key
W	F	SF	QF	#R	RR	Q#	P#	DNQ	A	Z#	PO	G	S	B	NMS	NTI	P	NH

(W) winner; (F) finalist; (SF) semifinalist; (QF) quarterfinalist; (#R) rounds 4, 3, 2, 1; (RR) round-robin stage; (Q#) qualification round; (P#) preliminary round; (DNQ) did not qualify; (A) absent; (Z#) Davis/Fed Cup Zonal Group (with number indication) or (PO) play-off; (G) gold, (S) silver or (B) bronze Olympic/Paralympic medal; (NMS) not a Masters tournament; (NTI) not a Tier I tournament; (P) postponed; (NH) not held; (SR) strike rate (events won / competed); (W–L) win–loss record.
To avoid confusion and double counting, these charts are updated at the conclusion of a tournament or when the player's participation has ended.

== ATP career finals ==
=== Doubles: 7 (3 titles, 4 runner-ups) ===
Legend Grand Slam (0–0) ATP 1000 (0–0) ATP 500 (0–0) ATP 250 (3–4)	Finals by surface Hard (2–1) Clay (1–3) Grass (0–0) Carpet (0–0)	Finals by setting Outdoor (2–3) Indoor (1–1)

Result	W–L	Date	Tournament	Tier	Surface	Partner	Opponents	Score
Win	1–0	Sep 2019	Chengdu Open, China	250 Series	Hard	(Serbia) Dušan Lajović	(Israel) Jonathan Erlich (France) Fabrice Martin	7–6^{(11–9)}, 3–6, [10–3]
Win	2–0	Feb 2020	Open Sud de France, France	250 Series	Hard (i)	(Croatia) Mate Pavić	(Pakistan) Aisam-ul-Haq Qureshi (United Kingdom) Dominic Inglot	6–4, 6–7^{(4–7)}, [10–4]
Win	3–0	Mar 2021	Argentina Open, Argentina	250 Series	Clay	(Bosnia and Herzegovina) Tomislav Brkić	(Uruguay) Ariel Behar (Ecuador) Gonzalo Escobar	6–3, 7–5
Loss	3–1	Apr 2021	Andalucía Open, Spain	250 Series	Clay	(Bosnia and Herzegovina) Tomislav Brkić	(Uruguay) Ariel Behar (Ecuador) Gonzalo Escobar	2–6, 4–6
Loss	3–2	Jul 2021	Croatia Open, Croatia	250 Series	Clay	(Bosnia and Herzegovina) Tomislav Brkić	(Brazil) Fernando Romboli (Spain) David Vega Hernández	3–6, 5–7
Loss	3–3	Oct 2021	Kremlin Cup, Russia	250 Series	Hard (i)	(Bosnia and Herzegovina) Tomislav Brkić	(Finland) Harri Heliövaara (Netherlands) Matwé Middelkoop	5–7, 6–4, [9–11]
Loss	3–4	Apr 2023	Estoril Open, Portugal	250 Series	Clay	(Serbia) Miomir Kecmanović	(Belgium) Sander Gillé (Belgium) Joran Vliegen	3–6, 4–6

== Team competition finals ==
Result	W–L	Date	Team competition	Surface	Partner/Team	Opponents	Score
Win	1–0	Jan 2020	ATP Cup, Sydney, Australia	Hard	(Serbia) Novak Djokovic (Serbia) Dušan Lajović (Serbia) Nikola Milojević (Serbia) Viktor Troicki	(Spain) Rafael Nadal (Spain) Roberto Bautista Agut (Spain) Pablo Carreño Busta (Spain) Albert Ramos Viñolas (Spain) Feliciano López	2–1

== Challenger and Futures finals ==
=== Singles: 10 (5 titles, 5 runner-ups) ===
Legend (singles) ATP Challenger Tour (0–0) ITF Futures Tour (5–5)	Finals by surface Hard (0–3) Clay (5–1) Grass (0–0) Carpet (0–1)

Result	W–L	Date	Tournament	Tier	Surface	Opponent	Score
Loss	0–1	Jan 2011	Israel F3, Eilat	Futures	Hard	(Hungary) Ádám Kellner	2–6, 5–7
Win	1–1	Jun 2011	Serbia F1, Belgrade	Futures	Clay	(France) Axel Michon	6–3, 6–0
Win	2–1	Aug 2011	Croatia F7, Vinkovci	Futures	Clay	(Croatia) Dino Marcan	7–6^{(8–6)}, 6–0
Loss	2–2	Feb 2012	Russia F4, Yoshkar-Ola	Futures	Hard (i)	(Russia) Evgeny Kirillov	6–7^{(3–7)}, 6–7^{(3–7)}
Loss	2–3	Nov 2012	Greece F7, Heraklion	Futures	Carpet	(Croatia) Mate Delić	4–6, 6–7^{(3–7)}
Loss	2–4	Nov 2013	Greece F20, Rethymno	Futures	Hard	(United Kingdom) Oliver Golding	4–6, 6–7^{(4–7)}
Win	3–4	Aug 2014	Romania F13, Brașov	Futures	Clay	(Portugal) Frederico Ferreira Silva	6–4, 4–6, 7–5
Win	4–4	May 2016	Croatia F6, Bol	Futures	Clay	(Hungary) Péter Nagy	7–5, 6–4
Win	5–4	Nov 2017	Tunisia F35, Hammamet	Futures	Clay	(Spain) Carlos Boluda-Purkiss	6–1, 6–2
Loss	5–5	Dec 2017	Turkey F46, Antalya	Futures	Clay	(Bosnia and Herzegovina) Tomislav Brkić	6–7^{(2–7)}, 6–2, 6–7^{(7–9)}

=== Doubles: 59 (37 titles, 22 runner-ups) ===
Legend (doubles) ATP Challenger Tour (5–8) ITF Futures Tour (32–14)	Finals by surface Hard (7–9) Clay (27–13) Grass (0–0) Carpet (3–0)

Result	W–L	Date	Tournament	Tier	Surface	Partner	Opponents	Score
Win	1–0	Jun 2008	Serbia F2, Belgrade	Futures	Clay	(Serbia) Dušan Lajović	(Serbia) David Savić (Serbia) Miljan Zekić	7–6^{(8–6)}, 3–6, [10–8]
Loss	1–1	Oct 2010	Turkey F10, Antalya	Futures	Hard	(Bosnia and Herzegovina) Tomislav Brkić	(Ukraine) Artem Smirnov (Hungary) Róbert Varga	4–6, 4–6
Loss	1–2	Jan 2011	Israel F2, Eilat	Futures	Hard	(Canada) Steven Diez	(Bosnia and Herzegovina) Damir Džumhur (Bosnia and Herzegovina) Ismar Gorčić	3–6, 4–6
Win	2–2	Apr 2011	Turkey F12, Antalya	Futures	Hard	(Slovakia) Jozef Kovalík	(United Kingdom) David Rice (United Kingdom) Sean Thornley	4–6, 6–4, [10–4]
Win	3–2	May 2011	Bosnia & Herzegovina F2, Sarajevo	Futures	Clay	(Serbia) Miljan Zekić	(Slovenia) Rok Jarc (Slovenia) Tom Kočevar-Dešman	6–3, 6–4
Win	4–2	May 2011	Bosnia & Herzegovina F3, Brčko	Futures	Clay	(Croatia) Toni Androić	(Serbia) Marko Rajić (Serbia) Saša Vidojević	6–2, 6–3
Win	5–2	May 2011	Bosnia & Herzegovina F4, Prijedor	Futures	Clay	(Croatia) Toni Androić	(Slovenia) Rok Jarc (Slovenia) Tom Kočevar-Dešman	6–3, 6–2
Win	6–2	Jun 2011	Bosnia & Herzegovina F5, Kiseljak	Futures	Clay	(Croatia) Toni Androić	(Bosnia and Herzegovina) Damir Džumhur (Bosnia and Herzegovina) Ismar Gorčić	7–5, 6–4
Win	7–2	Jun 2011	Serbia F1, Belgrade	Futures	Clay	(Montenegro) Goran Tošić	(Montenegro) Nemanja Kontić (Serbia) Arsenije Zlatanović	6–0, 3–6, [10–7]
Loss	7–3	Jun 2011	Serbia F2, Belgrade	Futures	Clay	(Montenegro) Goran Tošić	(Bosnia and Herzegovina) Damir Džumhur (Bosnia and Herzegovina) Aldin Šetkić	6–2, 6–7^{(4–7)}, [6–10]
Loss	7–4	Jul 2011	Serbia F4, Kikinda	Futures	Clay	(Montenegro) Goran Tošić	(Croatia) Mislav Hižak (Croatia) Ante Pavić	5–7, 5–7
Win	8–4	Aug 2011	Serbia F5, Sombor	Futures	Clay	(Montenegro) Goran Tošić	(Serbia) Ivan Bjelica (Serbia) Vladimir Obradović	6–3, 6–4
Loss	8–5	Aug 2011	Serbia F7, Novi Sad	Futures	Clay	(Bosnia and Herzegovina) Damir Džumhur	(Serbia) Ivan Bjelica (Serbia) David Savić	7–5, 1–6, [5–10]
Win	9–5	Oct 2011	Croatia F10, Umag	Futures	Clay	(Croatia) Toni Androić	(Croatia) Marin Draganja (Croatia) Dino Marcan	2–6, 7–5, [10–4]
Win	10–5	Jan 2012	Turkey F2, Antalya	Futures	Hard	(Croatia) Toni Androić	(Sweden) Patrik Brydolf (France) Florian Reynet	6–3, 6–2
Loss	10–6	Mar 2012	Italy F1, Trento	Futures	Hard (i)	(Bosnia and Herzegovina) Damir Džumhur	(Italy) Marco Crugnola (Italy) Claudio Grassi	4–6, 4–6
Win	11–6	Jun 2012	Serbia F1, Belgrade	Futures	Clay	(Montenegro) Goran Tošić	(Serbia) Danilo Petrović (Canada) Milan Pokrajac	6–4, 6–4
Win	12–6	Jun 2012	Serbia F2, Belgrade	Futures	Clay	(Montenegro) Goran Tošić	(Spain) Juan Lizariturry (Spain) Enrique López Pérez	6–2, 6–4
Win	13–6	Sep 2012	Germany F17, Hambach	Futures	Carpet (i)	(Slovakia) Adrian Sikora	(Germany) Pirmin Hänle (New Zealand) Matt Simpson	6–2, 6–3
Win	14–6	Nov 2012	Greece F6, Heraklion	Futures	Carpet	(Croatia) Mate Delić	(Belgium) Julien Dubail (Belgium) Yannick Vandenbulcke	7–5, 6–2
Win	15–6	Nov 2012	Greece F7, Heraklion	Futures	Carpet	(Croatia) Mate Delić	(France) Enzo Couacaud (Belgium) Julien Dubail	6–1, 6–2
Win	16–6	Feb 2013	France F3, Feucherolles	Futures	Hard (i)	(Serbia) Miljan Zekić	(Netherlands) Stephan Fransen (Netherlands) Wesley Koolhof	3–6, 7–5, [10–8]
Win	17–6	Apr 2013	Italy F5, Vicenza	Futures	Clay	(Bosnia and Herzegovina) Damir Džumhur	(Italy) Alessandro Motti (Italy) Matteo Volante	6–3, 6–4
Loss	17–7	Aug 2013	Serbia F10, Novi Sad	Futures	Clay	(Serbia) Denis Bejtulahi	(Serbia) Boris Čonkić (Italy) Matteo Fago	6–7^{(4–7)}, 2–6
Loss	17–8	Sep 2013	Serbia F11, Zlatibor	Futures	Clay	(Serbia) Denis Bejtulahi	(Croatia) Duje Kekez (Serbia) Ilija Vučić	3–6, 4–6
Loss	17–9	Nov 2013	Greece F20, Rethymno	Futures	Hard	(Greece) Alexandros Jakupovic	(United Kingdom) Lewis Burton (United Kingdom) Marcus Willis	4–6, 6–7^{(5–7)}
Loss	17–10	Feb 2014	Italy F1, Sondrio	Futures	Hard (i)	(Serbia) Ilija Vučić	(Czech Republic) Roman Jebavý (Czech Republic) Robin Staněk	6–3, 5–7, [7–10]
Loss	17–11	Mar 2014	Greece F1, Heraklion	Futures	Hard	(Serbia) Ilija Vučić	(United Kingdom) Oliver Golding (Greece) Alexandros Jakupovic	1–6, 6–3, [5–10]
Win	18–11	Mar 2014	Greece F2, Heraklion	Futures	Hard	(Serbia) Ilija Vučić	(Czech Republic) Jan Hernych (Czech Republic) Robin Staněk	7–6^{(7–1)}, 7–5
Win	19–11	May 2014	Bosnia & Herzegovina F1, Doboj	Futures	Clay	(Bosnia and Herzegovina) Tomislav Brkić	(Serbia) Ivan Milivojević (Serbia) Bojan Zdravković	6–1, 6–3
Win	20–11	May 2014	Bosnia & Herzegovina F2, Prijedor	Futures	Clay	(Bosnia and Herzegovina) Tomislav Brkić	(Serbia) Darko Jandrić (Croatia) Ante Marinčić	6–3, 6–2
Win	21–11	May 2014	Bosnia & Herzegovina F3, Brčko	Futures	Clay	(Serbia) Marko Tepavac	(Serbia) Nikola Ćirić (Serbia) Danilo Petrović	6–4, 1–6, [10–1]
Win	22–11	Jan 2016	USA F3, Plantation	Futures	Clay	(Serbia) Denis Bejtulahi	(United States) Nick Chappell (United States) Raleigh Smith	3–6, 6–3, [10–7]
Win	23–11	Jan 2017	USA F3, Plantation	Futures	Clay	(Bosnia and Herzegovina) Tomislav Brkić	(Spain) Jaume Pla Malfeito (Spain) Miguel Semmler	4–6, 6–1, [10–3]
Loss	23–12	Jan 2017	USA F4, Sunrise	Futures	Clay	(Bosnia and Herzegovina) Tomislav Brkić	(Germany) Peter Torebko (Austria) Bastian Trinker	6–7^{(3–7)}, 6–4, [7–10]
Win	24–12	Feb 2017	Tunisia F7, Hammamet	Futures	Clay	(Bosnia and Herzegovina) Tomislav Brkić	(Brazil) Oscar José Gutierrez (Brazil) Nicolas Santos	6–3, 6–2
Win	25–12	Jun 2017	Hungary F4, Gyula	Futures	Clay	(Australia) Scott Puodziunas	(Hungary) Levente Gödry (Hungary) Péter Nagy	7–6^{(7–2)}, 6–2
Loss	25–13	Jul 2017	Turkey F25, Istanbul	Futures	Clay	(Bulgaria) Vasko Mladenov	(Serbia) Miki Janković (Bulgaria) Dimitar Kuzmanov	4–6, 6–2, [9–11]
Win	26–13	Jul 2017	Turkey F29, Mersin	Futures	Clay	(Portugal) Bernardo Saraiva	(Russia) Bogdan Bobrov (Serbia) Goran Marković	6–2, 3–6, [11–9]
Win	27–13	Oct 2017	Turkey F38, Antalya	Futures	Clay	(Kazakhstan) Dmitry Popko	(Germany) Peter Torebko (Belgium) Jeroen Vanneste	6–1, 6–4
Win	28–13	Nov 2017	Tunisia F34, Hammamet	Futures	Clay	(Croatia) Nino Serdarušić	(Spain) Marc Giner (Spain) Jaume Pla Malfeito	6–2, 6–1
Win	29–13	Nov 2017	Tunisia F35, Hammamet	Futures	Clay	(Croatia) Nino Serdarušić	(Tunisia) Moez Echargui (Tunisia) Anis Ghorbel	7–5, 6–3
Win	30–13	Dec 2017	Turkey F45, Antalya	Futures	Clay	(Switzerland) Luca Margaroli	(Turkey) Gökberk Ergeneman (Uzbekistan) Khumoyun Sultanov	7–5, 6–2
Win	31–13	Dec 2017	Turkey F46, Antalya	Futures	Clay	(Switzerland) Luca Margaroli	(Russia) Ivan Gakhov (Russia) Alexander Pavlioutchenkov	6–3, 7–6^{(7–1)}
Win	32–13	Mar 2018	Turkey F8, Antalya	Futures	Hard	(Poland) Maciej Smoła	(Netherlands) Michiel de Krom (Netherlands) Ryan Nijboer	6–3, 6–4
Loss	32–14	Apr 2018	Uzbekistan F1, Bukhara	Futures	Hard	(Switzerland) Luca Margaroli	(Russia) Alexander Pavlioutchenkov (Russia) Evgenii Tiurnev	6–7^{(4–7)}, 7–6^{(7–5)}, [8–10]
Loss	32–15	Jun 2018	Poprad-Tatry, Slovakia	Challenger	Clay	(Switzerland) Luca Margaroli	(Bosnia and Herzegovina) Tomislav Brkić (Croatia) Ante Pavić	3–6, 6–4, [14–16]
Loss	32–16	Aug 2018	Portorož, Slovenia	Challenger	Hard	(Austria) Lucas Miedler	(Spain) Gerard Granollers Pujol (Czech Republic) Lukáš Rosol	5–7, 3–6
Loss	32–17	May 2019	Rome, Italy	Challenger	Clay	(Czech Republic) Adam Pavlásek	(Austria) Philipp Oswald (Slovakia) Filip Polášek	w/o
Win	33–17	Jun 2019	Shymkent, Kazakhstan	Challenger	Clay	(Chinese Taipei) Yang Tsung-hua	(Sweden) André Göransson (Switzerland) Marc-Andrea Hüsler	6–4, 6–4
Loss	33–18	Jun 2019	Fergana, Uzbekistan	Challenger	Hard	(Chinese Taipei) Yang Tsung-hua	(United States) Evan King (United States) Hunter Reese	3–6, 7–5, [4–10]
Loss	33–19	Aug 2019	Liberec, Czech Republic	Challenger	Clay	(Croatia) Antonio Šančić	(Czech Republic) Jonáš Forejtek (Czech Republic) Michael Vrbenský	4–6, 3–6
Loss	33–20	Aug 2019	Cordenons, Italy	Challenger	Clay	(Croatia) Antonio Šančić	(Bosnia and Herzegovina) Tomislav Brkić (Croatia) Ante Pavić	2–6, 3–6
Win	34–20	Nov 2019	Ortisei, Italy	Challenger	Hard (i)	(Croatia) Antonio Šančić	(Netherlands) Sander Arends (Netherlands) David Pel	6–7^{(5–7)}, 7–6^{(7–3)}, [10–7]
Win	35–20	Jan 2020	Bendigo, Australia	Challenger	Hard	(Ukraine) Denys Molchanov	(El Salvador) Marcelo Arévalo (United Kingdom) Jonny O'Mara	7–6^{(7–3)}, 6–4
Win	36–20	Sep 2020	Forlì, Italy	Challenger	Clay	(Bosnia and Herzegovina) Tomislav Brkić	(Kazakhstan) Andrey Golubev (Italy) Andrea Vavassori	3–6, 7–5, [10–3]
Loss	36–21	Apr 2021	Belgrade, Serbia	Challenger	Clay	(Bosnia and Herzegovina) Tomislav Brkić	(Argentina) Guillermo Durán (Argentina) Andrés Molteni	4–6, 4–6
Win	37–21	Oct 2022	Parma, Italy	Challenger	Clay	(Bosnia and Herzegovina) Tomislav Brkić	(Venezuela) Luis David Martínez (Slovakia) Igor Zelenay	6–2, 6–2
Loss	37–22	Apr 2023	Sanremo, Italy	Challenger	Clay	(Brazil) Marcelo Demoliner	(Romania) Victor Vlad Cornea (Croatia) Franko Škugor	2–6, 3–6

== See also ==
- Serbia Davis Cup team
- List of Serbia Davis Cup team representatives
- Sport in Serbia
