= Luca Van Assche =

Belgian-born French tennis player

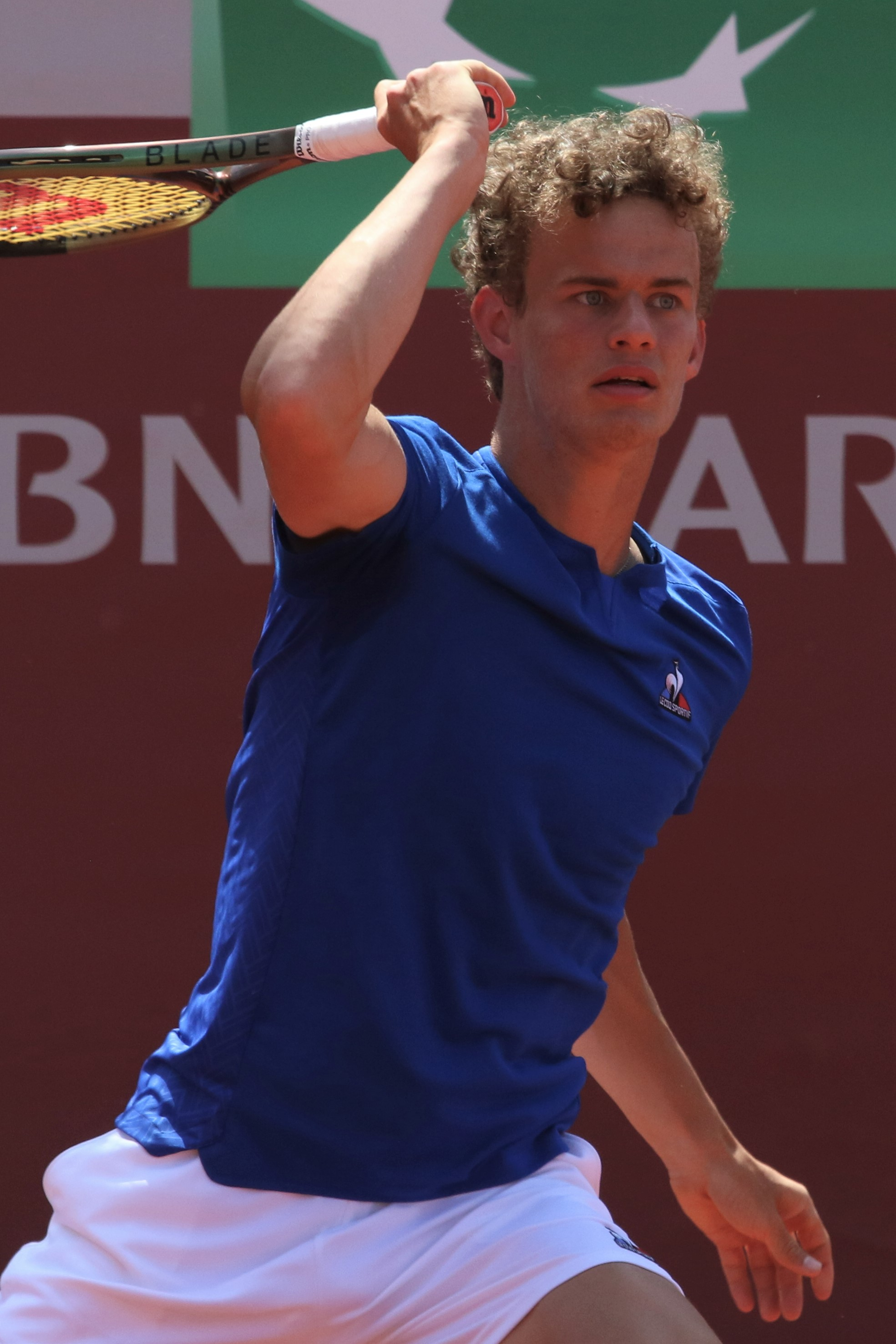
- Van Assche at the 2022 BNP Paribas Primrose Bordeaux
- Country (sports): France
- Residence: Paris, France
- Born: 11 May 2004 (age 22) Woluwe-Saint-Lambert, Belgium
- Height: 1.78 m (5 ft 10 in)
- Turned pro: 2021
- Plays: Right-handed (two-handed backhand)
- Coach: Sébastien Villette, Maxime Teixeira
- Prize money: US $3,885,899

Singles
- Career record: 39–53
- Career titles: 1
- Highest ranking: No. 34 (9 November 2026)
- Current ranking: No. 34 (9 November 2026)

Grand Slam singles results
- Australian Open: 3R (2024)
- French Open: 2R (2023, 2026)
- Wimbledon: 1R (2023, 2024, 2026)
- US Open: 2R (2026)

Doubles
- Career record: 3–9
- Career titles: 0
- Highest ranking: No. 335 (9 January 2023)
- Current ranking: No. 584 (9 November 2026)

Grand Slam doubles results
- French Open: 1R (2022, 2023, 2026)
- Wimbledon: 2R (2023)
- US Open: 1R (2023)
- Last updated on: 9 November 2026.

Luca Van Assche (French pronunciation: [lyka vanaʃ]; born 11 May 2004) is a Belgian-born French professional tennis player. He has a career-high ATP singles ranking of world No. 34 achieved on 9 November 2026 and a best doubles ranking of No. 335, reached on 9 January 2023.

Van Assche has won one ATP Tour singles title at the 2026 Estoril Open.

== Early life ==
Van Assche was born in Woluwe-Saint-Lambert, Belgium but his parents moved the whole family to Aix-en-Provence, France, where he was raised. Throughout his childhood, he also lived in Lyon and Paris. He started taking tennis lessons as a kid.

== Career ==
=== 2021: Junior No. 1 ===
In 2021, Van Assche had remarkable results on ITF junior circuit. He won the boys' singles title at the 2021 French Open, defeating countryman Arthur Fils in the final. He reached an ITF junior combined ranking of world No. 1 on 5 July 2021.

=== 2022: ATP & top 150 debuts ===
In January, ranked No. 445, Van Assche received a wildcard for the qualifying event at the 2022 Open Sud de France but lost to Roman Safiullin. He also made his ATP main draw doubles debut after receiving a wildcard into the main draw with Sascha Gueymard Wayenburg where they defeated David Vega Hernández and Denys Molchanov to win their first ATP tour level match. He also made his Grand Slam debut in doubles at the French Open as a wildcard pair partnering also Gueymard Wayenburg.

In October, Van Assche reached his first singles final on the ATP Challenger Tour in Lisbon, Portugal, entering the main draw as a qualifier and losing to Marco Cecchinato in the finals. As a result, he broke into the top 250. The following week, he made his ATP singles debut in Antwerp after qualifying for the main draw.

On 14 November, he entered the top 200 at world No. 198, after reaching the final of the Brest Challenger losing to Grégoire Barrère and the quarterfinals in Roanne.

In December, Van Assche won his maiden Challenger title in Maia defeating qualifier Maximilian Neuchrist in the final. As a result, he moved to No. 138 in the rankings, making him the youngest player in the top 150.

=== 2023: Major singles & top 100 debuts, first ATP win ===
Van Assche received a wildcard into the 2023 Australian Open main draw to make his Grand Slam tournament debut in singles, losing in the first round to 11th seed Cameron Norrie.

Van Assche competed at the Teréga Open Pau–Pyrénées, a 125-level event, where he won his second Challenger title. In the final match, he defeated countryman Ugo Humbert in three hours and 56 minutes, which set a record for the longest ATP Challenger final. As a result, he moved close to 40 positions up and reached the top 110 on 6 March 2023. Following his third Challenger title at the 2023 Sanremo Challenger, Italy, he reached No. 91 on 3 April 2023 making him the youngest player in the top 100 at that time. The next week, he recorded his first ATP win at the Estoril Open over qualifier Pedro Sousa after entering into the main draw directly. He lost his next match to third seed Alejandro Davidovich Fokina.

Van Assche recorded his first top-100 win over Swiss Stan Wawrinka at the Srpska Open, before losing to world No.1 Novak Djokovic in the second round.

Van Assche recorded his first major win at the French Open defeating Marco Cecchinato in the first round before losing to 29th seed Alejandro Davidovich Fokina in the second round. He made his Wimbledon debut in July, losing to Aslan Karatsev in the first round. At Wimbledon, Van Assche recorded his first Grand Slam doubles win, playing along with fellow countryman Arthur Fils, defeating brothers Stefanos Tsitsipas and Petros Tsitsipas in the first round.

In November, he qualified for the Next Generation ATP Finals where wins over Abedallah Shelbayh and Alex Michelsen were enough for Van Assche to advance from his group into the semifinals despite a defeat to Hamad Medjedovic. He lost in the last four to top seed Arthur Fils.

=== 2024: Australian Open third round ===
At the Australian Open, Van Assche reached the third round defeating James Duckworth and 25th seed Lorenzo Musetti, before losing to seventh seed Stefanos Tsitsipas. Later that season, he qualified for another edition of NextGen Finals, where he equalled his best result at the previous year, reaching the semifinals. He lost to eventual champion João Fonseca in straight sets.

=== 2025: Challenger 125 title, back to top 150 ===
In May, ranked No. 211, Van Assche reached his first Challenger final in more than two years at the 2025 Zagreb Open, losing to Dino Prižmić in the final. In October, Van Assche won his first Challenger title in more than two years at the Olbia Challenger 125, defeating Pablo Carreño Busta in the final.

=== 2026: Maiden ATP title, top 40 ===
In February, Van Assche won his fifth Challenger title at the Quimper Open Bretagne Occidentale 125 Challenger. In the same month, he won his second Challenger title of the year at the 2026 Play In Challenger in Lille, defeating Alexander Blockx in the final. As a result, he moved back in the top 100 on 23 February 2026. In June, he won his third Challenger title of the year at the 2026 Emilia-Romagna Open in Parma, defeating Sebastian Ofner in the final.

In July, Van Assche won his maiden ATP Tour title at the Estoril Open. En route to the final he defeated top seed Andrey Rublev in the quarterfinals, his first win over a top 20 player, and then fellow countryman Hugo Gaston in the semifinals. In the final he defeated fourth seed Alexander Blockx. As a result, he entered the top 50 at a new career-high singles ranking of world No. 48 on 27 July 2026.

== Personal life ==
Van Assche has a Belgian father and an Italian mother, who later was naturalised French. He also has two sisters, Sofia and Elisa.

Van Assche studies mathematics at the Paris Dauphine University.

== Career statistics ==
=== Performance timeline ===
Key
W	F	SF	QF	#R	RR	Q#	P#	DNQ	A	Z#	PO	G	S	B	NMS	NTI	P	NH

(W) winner; (F) finalist; (SF) semifinalist; (QF) quarterfinalist; (#R) rounds 4, 3, 2, 1; (RR) round-robin stage; (Q#) qualification round; (P#) preliminary round; (DNQ) did not qualify; (A) absent; (Z#) Davis/Fed Cup Zonal Group (with number indication) or (PO) play-off; (G) gold, (S) silver or (B) bronze Olympic/Paralympic medal; (NMS) not a Masters tournament; (NTI) not a Tier I tournament; (P) postponed; (NH) not held; (SR) strike rate (events won / competed); (W–L) win–loss record.
To avoid confusion and double counting, these charts are updated at the conclusion of a tournament or when the player's participation has ended.

==== Singles ====
Current through the 2026 Paris Masters.

Tournament	2021	2022	2023	2024	2025	2026	SR	W–L	Win %
Grand Slam tournaments
Australian Open	A	A	1R	3R	A	Q3	0 / 2	2–2	50%
French Open	Q1	Q1	2R	1R	Q3	2R	0 / 3	2–3	40%
Wimbledon	A	A	1R	1R	Q2	1R	0 / 3	0–3	0%
US Open	A	A	1R	Q2	Q2	2R	0 / 2	1–2	33%
Win–loss	0-0	0–0	1–4	2–3	0–0	2-3	0 / 10	5–10	33%
ATP 1000 tournaments
Indian Wells Open	A	A	A	1R	A	Q1	0 / 1	0–1	0%
Miami Open	A	A	A	2R	A	Q2	0 / 1	1–1	50%
Monte-Carlo Masters	A	A	Q2	Q1	A	A	0 / 0	0–0	–
Madrid Open	A	A	Q1	2R	Q1	Q1	0 / 1	1–1	50%
Italian Open	A	A	1R	A	A	Q1	0 / 1	0–1	0%
Canadian Open	A	A	A	A	A	1R	0 / 1	0–1	0%
Cincinnati Open	A	A	Q1	A	A	1R	0 / 1	0–1	0%
Shanghai Masters	NH		1R	A	A	1R	0 / 2	0–2	0%
Paris Masters	Q1	A	1R	A	Q1	SF	0 / 2	4–2	67%
Win–loss	0-0	0–0	0–3	2–3	0–0	4–4	0 / 10	6–10	38%

=== ATP Tour finals ===
==== Singles: 1 (title) ====
Legend Grand Slam (–) ATP 1000 (–) ATP 500 (–) ATP 250 (1–0)	Finals by surface Hard (–) Clay (1–0) Grass (–)	Finals by setting Outdoor (1–0) Indoor (–)

Result	W–L	Date	Tournament	Tier	Surface	Opponent	Score
Win	1–0	Jul 2026	Estoril Open, Portugal	ATP 250	Clay	(Belgium) Alexander Blockx	6–4, 4–6, 7–5

=== ATP Challenger Tour finals ===
==== Singles: 12 (8 titles, 4 runner-ups) ====
Legend ATP Challenger Tour (8–4)	Finals by surface Hard (5–1) Clay (3–3)

Result	W–L	Date	Tournament	Tier	Surface	Opponent	Score
Loss	0–1	Oct 2022	Lisboa Belém Open, Portugal	Challenger	Clay	(Italy) Marco Cecchinato	3–6, 3–6
Loss	0–2	Oct 2022	Brest Challenger, France	Challenger	Hard (i)	(France) Grégoire Barrère	3–6, 3–6
Loss	0–3	Nov 2022	Copa Faulcombridge, Spain	Challenger	Clay	(Ukraine) Oleksii Krutykh	2–6, 0–6
Win	1–3	Dec 2022	Maia Challenger, Portugal	Challenger	Clay (i)	(Austria) Maximilian Neuchrist	3–6, 6–4, 6–0
Win	2–3	Feb 2023	Open Pau–Pyrénées, France	Challenger	Hard (i)	(France) Ugo Humbert	7–6^{(7–5)}, 4–6, 7–6^{(8–6)}
Win	3–3	Apr 2023	Sanremo Challenger, Italy	Challenger	Clay	(Peru) Juan Pablo Varillas	6–1, 6–3
Loss	3–4	May 2025	Zagreb Open, Croatia	Challenger	Clay	(Croatia) Dino Prižmić	2–6, ret.
Win	4–4	Oct 2025	Olbia Challenger, Italy	Challenger	Hard	(Spain) Pablo Carreño Busta	7–6^{(7–5)}, 6–7^{(1–7)}, 6–2
Win	5–4	Jan 2026	Open Quimper Bretagne, France	Challenger	Hard (i)	(Switzerland) Rémy Bertola	3–6, 6–1, 7–5
Win	6–4	Feb 2026	Play In Challenger, France	Challenger	Hard (i)	(Belgium) Alexander Blockx	6–2, 6–4
Win	7–4	Jun 2026	Emilia-Romagna Open, Italy	Challenger	Clay	(Austria) Sebastian Ofner	2–6, 6–2, 6–3
Win	8–4	Aug 2026	Québec Challenger, Canada	Challenger	Hard	(Greece) Stefanos Sakellaridis	6–1, 6–4

=== ITF World Tennis Tour finals ===
==== Singles: 1 (title) ====
Legend ITF WTT (1–0)

Result	W–L	Date	Tournament	Tier	Surface	Opponent	Score
Win	1–0	Jan 2022	M15+H Bagnoles de l'Orne, France	WTT	Clay (i)	(France) Corentin Denolly	7–5, 6–3

==== Doubles: 1 (title) ====
Legend ITF WTT (1–0)

Result	W–L	Date	Tournament	Tier	Surface	Partner	Opponents	Score
Win	1–0	Jan 2022	M15+H Bagnoles-de-l'Orne, France	WTT	Clay (i)	(France) Corentin Denolly	(France) Ronan Joncour (France) Mandresy Rakotomalala	6–3, 6–4

=== Junior Grand Slam finals ===
==== Singles: 1 (title) ====
Result	Year	Tournament	Surface	Opponent	Score
Win	2021	French Open	Clay	(France) Arthur Fils	6–4, 6–2
