= Sanremo Challenger =

Defunct tennis tournament
- Event name: Sanremo
- Location: Sanremo, Italy
- Venue: Circolo Tennis Sanremo
- Category: ATP Challenger Tour
- Surface: Clay (red)
- Draw: 32S/24Q/16D
- Prize money: €45,000 (2022)
- Website: tennissanremo.it/

Current champions (2023)
- Singles: (France) Luca Van Assche
- Doubles: (Romania) Victor Vlad Cornea (Croatia) Franko Škugor

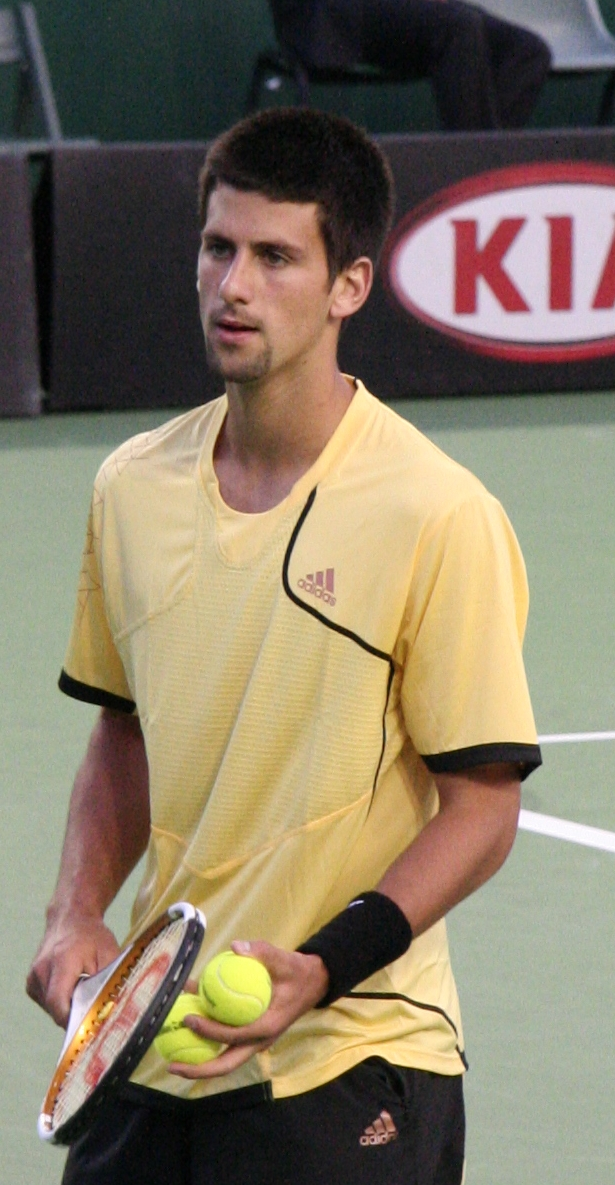
Eventual 2008 Australian Open champion Novak Djokovic took the singles title in 2005, competing for Serbia and Montenegro

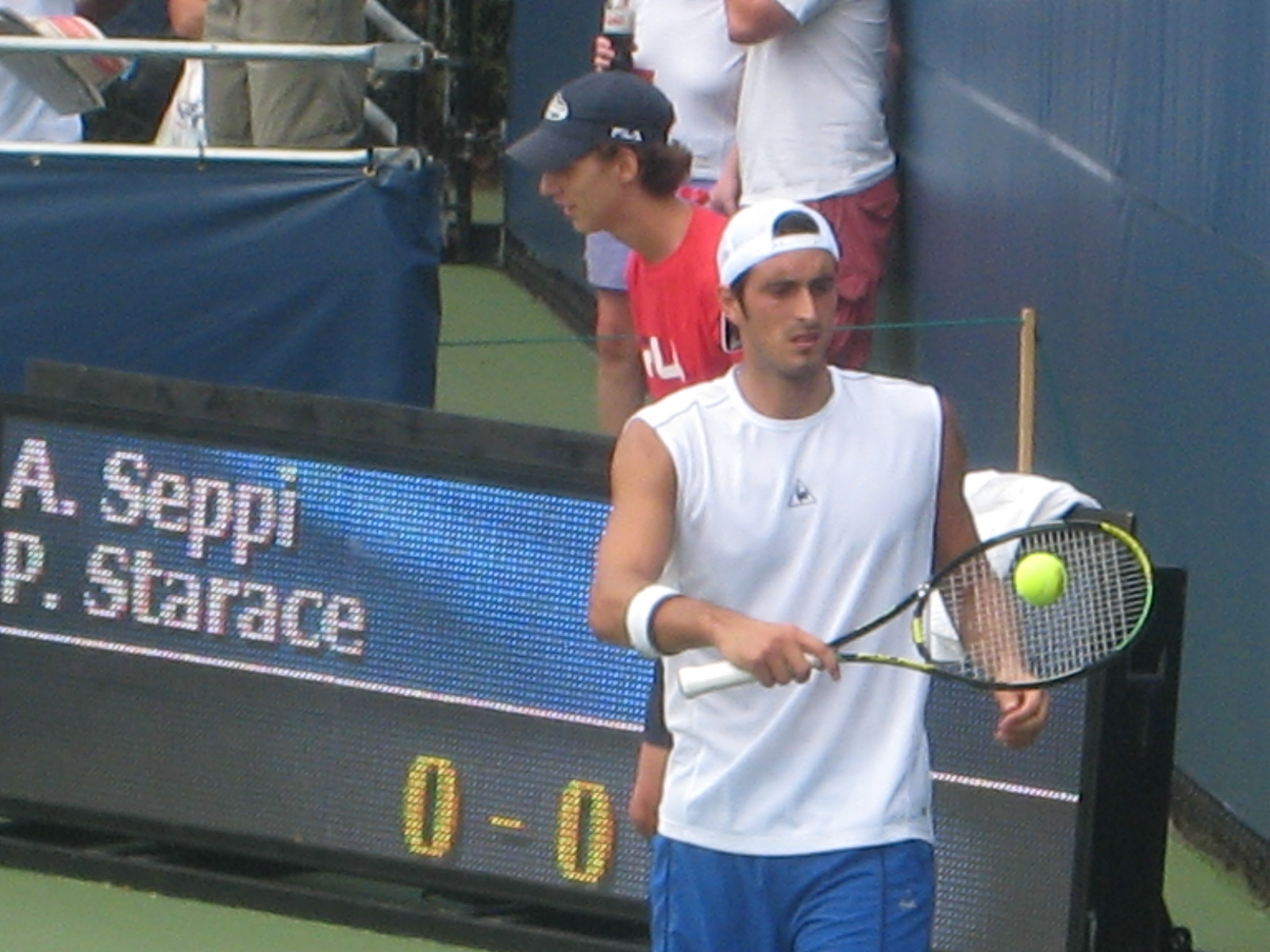
Potito Starace was the first Italian player to clinch the singles title in 2004

The Sanremo Challenger, previously known as Sanremo Tennis Cup was a professional tennis tournament played on outdoor red clay courts. It was part of the Association of Tennis Professionals (ATP) Challenger Tour. It was held annually at the Circolo Tennis Sanremo in Sanremo, Italy, since 2002. After a hiatus of 10 years, it came back in 2022 with a new edition.

Daniele Bracciali has won the most titles, 3 times in doubles.

== Past finals ==
=== Singles ===
Year	Champion	Runner-up	Score
2023	(France) Luca Van Assche	(Peru) Juan Pablo Varillas	6–1, 6–3
2022	(Denmark) Holger Rune	(Italy) Francesco Passaro	6–1, 2–6, 6–4
2011–2021	Not held		
2010	(Argentina) Gastón Gaudio	(Argentina) Martín Vassallo Argüello	7–5,6–0
2009	(South Africa) Kevin Anderson	(Slovenia) Blaž Kavčič	2–6, 6–2, 7–5
2008	(Argentina) Diego Junqueira	(Argentina) Máximo González	6–2, 6–4
2007	(Italy) Francesco Aldi	(Italy) Fabio Fognini	7–5, 6–7(4), 6–4
2006	(France) Olivier Patience	(Italy) Stefano Galvani	6–2, 4–6, 7–6(8)
2005	(Serbia and Montenegro) Novak Djokovic	(Italy) Francesco Aldi	6–3, 7–6(4)
2004	(Italy) Potito Starace	(Netherlands) Peter Wessels	6–4, 6–4
2003	(Germany) Tomas Behrend	(Austria) Werner Eschauer	6–4, 6–2
2002	(Germany) Oliver Gross	(Italy) Renzo Furlan	6–4, 6–3

=== Doubles ===
Year	Champions	Runners-up	Score
2023	(Romania) Victor Vlad Cornea (Croatia) Franko Škugor	(Serbia) Nikola Ćaćić (Brazil) Marcelo Demoliner	6–2, 6–3
2022	(France) Geoffrey Blancaneaux (France) Alexandre Müller	(Italy) Flavio Cobolli (Italy) Matteo Gigante	4–6, 6–3, [11–9]
2011–2021	Not held		
2010	(Argentina) Diego Junqueira (Argentina) Martín Vassallo Argüello	(Argentina) Carlos Berlocq (Argentina) Sebastián Decoud	2–6, 6–4, [10–8]
2009	(Kazakhstan) Yuri Schukin (Russia) Dmitri Sitak	(Italy) Daniele Bracciali (Italy) Giancarlo Petrazzuolo	6–4, 7–6(4)
2008	(Israel) Harel Levy (United States) Jim Thomas	(Germany) Matthias Bachinger (Germany) Daniel Brands	6–4, 6–4
2007	(Thailand) Sanchai Ratiwatana (Thailand) Sonchat Ratiwatana	(Belgium) Steve Darcis (Belgium) Stefan Wauters	7–6(3), 6–3
2006	(France) Julien Benneteau (France) Nicolas Mahut	(Italy) Flavio Cipolla (Italy) Francesco Piccari	6–4, 7–6(6)
2005	(Italy) Francesco Aldi (Italy) Tomas Tenconi	(Italy) Manuel Jorquera (Russia) Dmitry Tursunov	6–4, 6–3
2004	(Italy) Daniele Bracciali (3) (Italy) Giorgio Galimberti (2)	(Italy) Manuel Jorquera (Argentina) Diego Moyano	4–6, 7–6(6), 6–2
2003	(Italy) Daniele Bracciali (2) (Israel) Amir Hadad	(Spain) Juan Balcells (Spain) Juan Albert Viloca	6–2, 6–4
2002	(Italy) Daniele Bracciali (1) (Italy) Giorgio Galimberti (1)	(Italy) Cristian Brandi (Italy) Renzo Furlan	6–3, 6–4
