= João Sousa career statistics =

Career finals
Discipline	Type	Won	Lost	Total
Singles	Grand Slam	–	–	–
Singles	ATP Finals	–	–	–
Singles	ATP 1000	–	–	–
Singles	ATP 500	–		-
Singles	ATP 250	4	7	11
Singles	Olympics	–	–	–
Singles	Total	4	7	11
Doubles	Grand Slam	–	–	–
Doubles	ATP Finals	–	–	–
Doubles	ATP 1000	–	1	–
Doubles	ATP 500	–	–	–
Doubles	ATP 250	–	–	–
Doubles	Olympics	–	–	–
Doubles	Total	–	1	–

João Sousa is the highest-ranked Portuguese tennis player by the Association of Tennis Professionals (ATP) as of February 2022. He competes on the ATP Tour, where he has won four singles titles from a total of eleven finals.

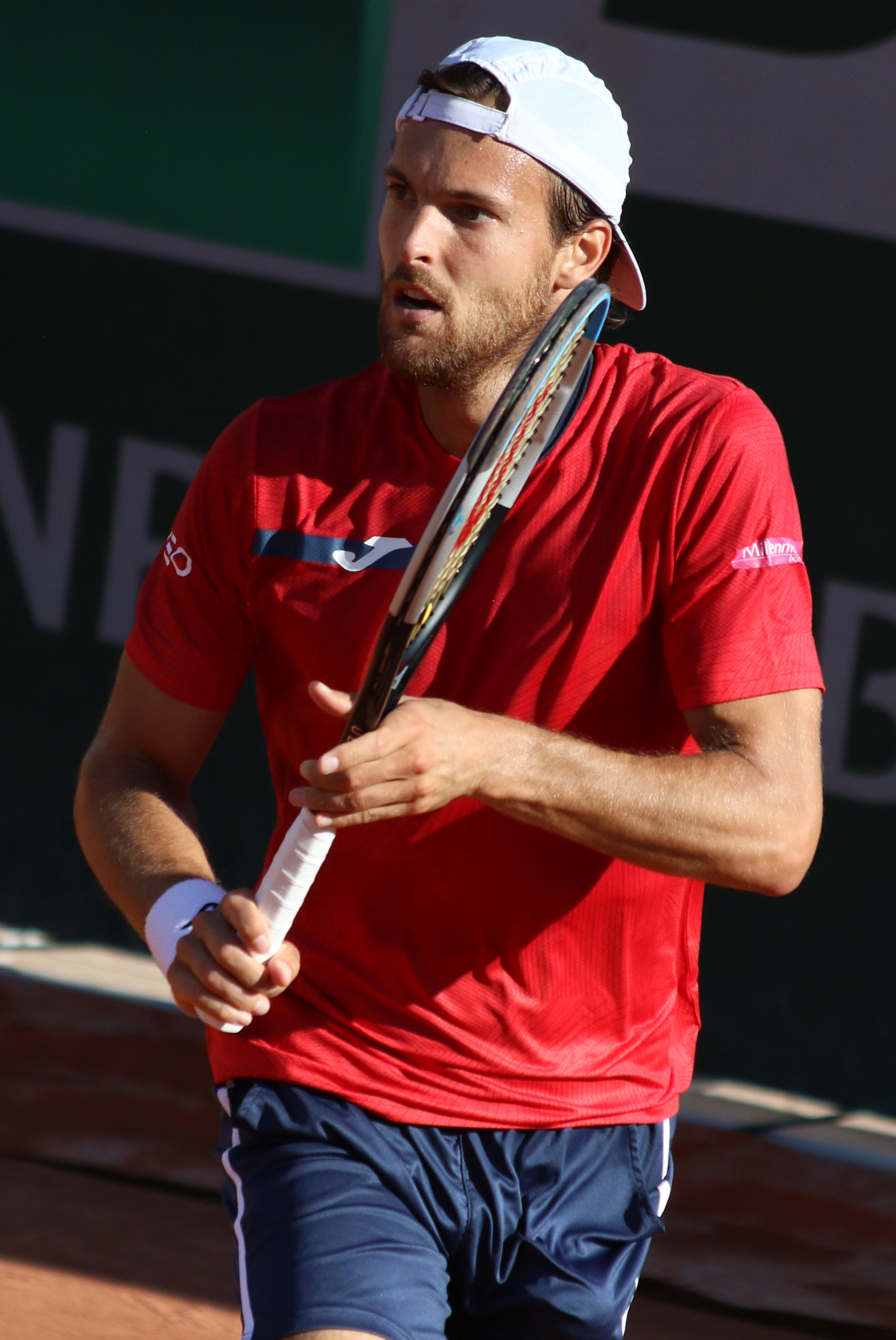
Sousa at the 2021 French Open

A professional player since 2005, Sousa peaked at number 61 in the world junior ranking in 2007, shortly after entering the main draw of the Orange Bowl. In June 2009, he won his first singles tournament, a Futures in Spain. Sousa started playing in the ATP Challenger Tour in 2008, winning his first tournament at this level in June 2011. Sousa debuted in the World Tour in 2008, playing that year's Estoril Open as a qualifier, and won his first top-tier ATP singles title in September 2013, at the Malaysian Open. He has participated in all four Grand Slams, having three third-round appearances at the US Open (2013) and Australian Open (2015 and 2016) as his best performances. While focusing on his singles career, Sousa has also competed in doubles; his best record is the quarterfinals of the 2015 US Open.

Sousa holds several Portuguese men's tennis records. In October 2013, he became the first player to break into the ATP singles ranking top 50, and in 2015, he secured a year-end top-50 ranking (no. 33) for the second time in his career, with 38 wins. In 2014, Sousa was the first Portuguese to play exclusively on the ATP World Tour in a single season, and the first to be seeded in a Grand Slam main draw (2014 US Open). He was the fourth Portuguese player to reach the singles top 100, and the second to do it in both singles and doubles rankings (after Nuno Marques). Sousa is also the Portuguese tennis player with the largest career prize money ever and most wins at Grand Slam singles tournaments.

== Performance timelines ==
Key
W	F	SF	QF	#R	RR	Q#	P#	DNQ	A	Z#	PO	G	S	B	NMS	NTI	P	NH

(W) winner; (F) finalist; (SF) semifinalist; (QF) quarterfinalist; (#R) rounds 4, 3, 2, 1; (RR) round-robin stage; (Q#) qualification round; (P#) preliminary round; (DNQ) did not qualify; (A) absent; (Z#) Davis/Fed Cup Zonal Group (with number indication) or (PO) play-off; (G) gold, (S) silver or (B) bronze Olympic/Paralympic medal; (NMS) not a Masters tournament; (NTI) not a Tier I tournament; (P) postponed; (NH) not held; (SR) strike rate (events won / competed); (W–L) win–loss record.
To avoid confusion and double counting, these charts are updated at the conclusion of a tournament or when the player's participation has ended.

=== Singles ===
Current through the 2022 Miami Open.

Tournament	2008	2009	2010	2011	2012	2013	2014	2015	2016	2017	2018	2019	2020	2021	2022	SR	W–L	Win%
Grand Slam tournaments
Australian Open	A	A	A	Q1	Q3	2R	1R	3R	3R	1R	2R	3R	1R	A	1R	0 / 9	8–9	47%
French Open	A	A	A	A	1R	2R	1R	2R	2R	2R	1R	1R	1R	1R	2R	0 / 11	5–11	31%
Wimbledon	A	A	A	Q1	Q2	Q3	1R	1R	3R	1R	1R	4R	NH	1R	1R	0 / 8	5–8	38%
US Open	A	A	A	Q2	Q1	3R	2R	1R	3R	1R	4R	1R	1R	Q1	2R	0 / 9	9–9	50%
Win–loss	0–0	0–0	0–0	0–0	0–1	4–3	1–4	3–4	7–4	1–4	4–4	5–4	0–3	0–2	2–4	0 / 37	27–37	42%
National representation
Summer Olympics	A	NH			A	NH			2R	NH				1R		0 / 2	1–2	33%
Davis Cup	Z2	Z2	Z2	Z1	Z1	Z2	Z1	Z2	Z1	Z1	Z1	QR	QR	WG1		0 / 13	27–16	63%
ATP 1000 tournaments
Indian Wells Open	A	A	A	A	A	Q1	2R	1R	2R	2R	3R	1R	NH	1R	1R	0 / 8	4–8	33%
Miami Open	A	A	A	A	A	1R	3R	1R	3R	2R	4R	3R	NH	2R	Q1	0 / 8	9–8	53%
Monte-Carlo Masters	A	A	A	A	A	A	1R	2R	2R	2R	A	1R	NH	Q2	Q1	0 / 5	3–5	38%
Madrid Open	A	A	A	A	A	Q1	1R	2R	QF	1R	A	1R	NH	A	Q1	0 / 5	4–5	44%
Italian Open	A	A	A	A	A	A	1R	1R	2R	1R	Q2	2R	1R	A	Q2	0 / 6	2–6	25%
Canadian Open	A	A	A	A	A	A	1R	1R	1R	A	1R	A	NH	A	Q1	0 / 4	0–4	0%
Cincinnati Open	A	A	A	A	A	Q2	2R	2R	1R	2R	1R	1R	Q1	A	A	0 / 6	3–6	33%
Shanghai Masters	A	A	A	A	A	A	1R	1R	1R	1R	Q2	2R	NH			0 / 5	1–5	17%
Paris Masters	A	A	A	A	A	Q1	1R	A	2R	2R	2R	A	A	A	Q1	0 / 4	3–4	43%
Win–loss	0–0	0–0	0–0	0–0	0–0	0–1	4–9	3–8	7–9	4–8	6–5	4–7	0–1	1–2	0–1	0 / 51	29–51	36%
Career statistics
	2008	2009	2010	2011	2012	2013	2014	2015	2016	2017	2018	2019	2020	2021	2022	Career		
Tournaments	1	0	0	1	4	14	34	31	33	30	27	28	9	12	4	Career total: 228		
Titles	0	0	0	0	0	1	0	1	0	0	1	0	0	0	1	Career total: 4		
Finals	0	0	0	0	0	1	2	4	0	2	1	0	0	0	2	Career total: 12		
Hard win–loss	0–1	1–0	0–0	0–1	2–1	13–10	13–20	19–17	13–21	10–14	18–18	12–15	1–6	2–4	5–3	3 / 122	109–131	45%
Clay win–loss	2–1	1–0	1–1	2–1	3–4	3–4	7–13	17–10	12–10	15–15	9–6	10–12	0–3	0–9	1–0	1 / 87	83–89	48%
Grass win–loss	0–0	0–0	0–0	0–0	0–0	0–0	4–3	2–4	2–3	0–3	2–3	4–4	0–0	0–1	0–0	0 / 21	14–21	40%
Overall win–loss	2–2	2–0	1–1	2–2	5–5	16–14	24–36	38–31	27–34	25–32	29–27	26–31	1–9	2–14	6–3	4 / 228	206–241	46%
Win (%)	50%	100%	50%	50%	50%	53%	40%	55%	44%	44%	52%	38%	10%	13%	67%	Career total: 46%		
Year-end ranking	592	443	244	192	101	49	54	33	43	57	44	60	90	137	82	$7,340,832		

=== Doubles ===
Tournament	2008	2009	2010	2011	2012	2013	2014	2015	2016	2017	2018	2019	2020	2021	2022	SR	W–L	Win%
Grand Slam tournaments
Australian Open	A	A	A	A	A	A	1R	2R	1R	1R	2R	SF	1R	A	A	0 / 7	6–7	46%
French Open	A	A	A	A	A	A	3R	1R	2R	1R	3R	1R	1R	A	1R	0 / 8	5–8	38%
Wimbledon	A	A	A	A	A	Q1	1R	1R	1R	1R	3R	2R	NH	A	2R	0 / 7	4–7	36%
US Open	A	A	A	A	A	A	2R	QF	1R	1R	2R	QF	A	A	QF	0 / 7	11–7	61%
Win–loss	0–0	0–0	0–0	0–0	0–0	0–0	3–4	4–4	1–4	0–4	6–4	8–4	0–2	0–0	4–3	0 / 29	26–29	47%
ATP 1000 tournaments
Indian Wells Open	A	A	A	A	A	A	A	A	2R	1R	A	A	NH	A		0 / 2	1–2	33%
Miami Open	A	A	A	A	A	A	A	A	1R	2R	A	2R	NH	A		0 / 3	2–3	40%
Monte-Carlo Masters	A	A	A	A	A	A	A	A	A	A	A	QF	NH	A		0 / 1	2–1	67%
Madrid Open	A	A	A	A	A	A	A	A	A	A	A	SF	NH	A		0 / 1	3–1	75%
Italian Open	A	A	A	A	A	A	A	A	2R	2R	F	1R	A	A		0 / 4	5–4	56%
Canadian Open	A	A	A	A	A	A	A	A	1R	A	2R	A	NH	A		0 / 2	1–2	33%
Cincinnati Open	A	A	A	A	A	A	A	A	A	A	1R	1R	A	A		0 / 2	0–2	0%
Shanghai Masters	A	A	A	A	A	A	A	A	1R	A	A	1R	NH			0 / 2	0–2	0%
Paris Masters	A	A	A	A	A	A	A	A	2R	A	A	A	A	A		0 / 1	1–1	50%
Win–loss	0–0	0–0	0–0	0–0	0–0	0–0	0–0	0–0	3–6	1–2	4–3	6–6	0–0	0–0	0–0	0 / 18	15–18	48%
National representation
Summer Olympics	A	NH				NH			2R	NH				1R		0 / 2	1–2	33%
Davis Cup	Z2	Z2	Z2	Z1	Z1	Z2	Z1	Z2	Z1	Z1	Z1	QR	QR	WG1		0 / 13	11–10	52%
Career statistics
	2008	2009	2010	2011	2012	2013	2014	2015	2016	2017	2018	2019	2020	2021	2022	Career		
Tournaments	0	1	0	1	1	1	19	11	20	17	15	21	3	9	0	Career total: 119		
Titles	0	0	0	0	0	0	0	0	0	0	0	0	0	0	0	Career total: 0		
Finals	0	0	0	0	0	0	0	0	0	0	1	0	0	0	0	Career total: 1		
Hard win–loss	0–0	0–0	0–0	0–0	0–2	1–0	8–11	5–6	5–14	1–6	6–10	12–7	1–2	0–3	0–0	0 / 52	39–61	39%
Clay win–loss	0–0	0–1	0–0	0–1	0–1	1–1	7–8	4–4	4–4	3–10	12–5	9–11	0–1	7–5	0–0	0 / 53	47–52	47%
Grass win–loss	0–0	0–0	0–0	0–0	0–0	0–0	0–2	0–1	1–3	1–2	3–2	1–3	0–0	0–1	0–0	0 / 14	6–14	30%
Overall win–loss	0–0	0–1	0–0	0–1	0–3	2–1	15–21	9–11	10–21	5–18	21–17	22–21	1–3	7–9	0–0	0 / 119	92–127	42%
Win (%)	–	0%	–	0%	0%	67%	42%	45%	32%	22%	55%	51%	25%	44%		Career total: 42%		
Year-end ranking	607	706	281	403	299	633	80	138	133	236	45	37	75	141	145			

== Significant finals ==
=== Masters 1000 finals ===
==== Doubles: 1 (1 runner-up) ====
Result	Year	Tournament	Surface	Partner	Opponents	Score
Loss	2018	Italian Open	Clay	(Spain) Pablo Carreño Busta	(Colombia) Juan Sebastián Cabal (Colombia) Robert Farah	6–3, 4–6, [4–10]

== ATP Career finals ==
=== Singles: 12 (4 titles, 8 runners-up) ===
Legend Grand Slam (0-0) ATP Masters 1000 (0-0) ATP 500 series (0-0) ATP 250 series (4–8)	Finals by surface Hard (3–3) Clay (1–5) Grass (0–0)	Finals by setting Outdoor (2–6) Indoor (2–2)

Result	W–L	Date	Tournament	Tier	Surface	Opponent	Score
Win	1–0	Sep 2013	Malaysian Open, Malaysia	250 series	Hard (i)	(France) Julien Benneteau	2–6, 7–5, 6–4
Loss	1–1	Jul 2014	Swedish Open, Sweden	250 series	Clay	(Uruguay) Pablo Cuevas	2–6, 1–6
Loss	1–2	Sep 2014	Open de Moselle, France	250 series	Hard (i)	(Belgium) David Goffin	4–6, 3–6
Loss	1–3	May 2015	Geneva Open, Switzerland	250 series	Clay	(Brazil) Thomaz Bellucci	6–7^{(4–7)}, 4–6
Loss	1–4	Jul 2015	Croatia Open Umag, Croatia	250 series	Clay	(Austria) Dominic Thiem	4–6, 1–6
Loss	1–5	Sep 2015	St. Petersburg Open, Russia	250 series	Hard (i)	(Canada) Milos Raonic	3–6, 6–3, 3–6
Win	2–5	Nov 2015	Valencia Open, Spain	250 series	Hard (i)	(Spain) Roberto Bautista Agut	3–6, 6–3, 6–4
Loss	2–6	Jan 2017	ASB Classic, New Zealand	250 series	Hard	(United States) Jack Sock	3–6, 7–5, 3–6
Loss	2–7	Aug 2017	Austrian Open Kitzbühel, Austria	250 series	Clay	(Germany) Philipp Kohlschreiber	3–6, 4–6
Win	3–7	May 2018	Estoril Open, Portugal	250 series	Clay	(United States) Frances Tiafoe	6–4, 6–4
Win	4–7	Feb 2022	Maharashtra Open, India	250 series	Hard	(Finland) Emil Ruusuvuori	7–6^{(11–9)}, 4–6, 6–1
Loss	4–8	May 2022	Geneva Open, Switzerland	250 series	Clay	(Norway) Casper Ruud	6–7^{(3–7)}, 6–4, 6–7^{(1–7)}

=== Doubles: 1 (1 runner-up) ===
Legend Grand Slam (0-0) ATP Masters 1000 (0–1) ATP 500 Series (0-0) ATP 250 Series (0-0)	Titles by surface Hard (0–0) Clay (0–1) Grass (0–0)	Titles by setting Outdoor (0–1) Indoor (0–0)

Result	W–L	Date	Tournament	Tier	Surface	Partner	Opponents	Score
Loss	0–1	May 2018	Italian Open, Italy	Masters 1000	Clay	(Spain) Pablo Carreño Busta	(Colombia) Juan Sebastián Cabal (Colombia) Robert Farah	6–3, 4–6, [4–10]

== ATP Challenger and ITF Futures finals ==
=== Singles: 20 (12–8) ===
Legend ATP Challenger (5–4) ITF Futures (7–4)	Finals by surface Hard (3–3) Clay (8–5) Grass (0–0) Carpet (1–0)

Result	W–L	Date	Tournament	Tier	Surface	Opponent	Score
Loss	0–1	May 2009	Spain F18, Gran Canaria	Futures	Clay	(Spain) Sergio Gutiérrez Ferrol	6–1, 1–6, 5–7
Win	1–1	Jun 2009	Spain F21, Puerto de la Cruz	Futures	Carpet	(Italy) Andrea Falgheri	6–7^{(2–7)}, 7–5, 6–3
Loss	1–2	Jul 2009	France F12, Saint-Gervais	Futures	Clay	(Spain) Adrián Menéndez Maceiras	6–1, 4–6, 5–7
Loss	1–3	Nov 2009	Spain F37, Vilafranca	Futures	Clay	(Spain) Pedro Clar	1–6, 3–6
Win	2–3	May 2010	Spain F17, Valldoreix	Futures	Clay	(Russia) Ivan Nedelko	6–0, 6–3
Win	3–3	May 2010	Spain F18, Adeje	Futures	Hard	(Germany) David Thurner	7–5, 6–4
Win	4–3	Jun 2010	Spain F19, Lanzarote	Futures	Hard	(Switzerland) Michael Lammer	7–5, 6–4
Loss	4–4	Oct 2010	Spain F35, Martos	Futures	Hard	(Spain) Adrián Menéndez Maceiras	5–7, 6–7^{(6–8)}
Win	5–4	May 2011	Spain F14, Balaguer	Futures	Clay	(Japan) Taro Daniel	6–3, 6–1
Win	6–4	May 2011	Spain F15, Lleida	Futures	Clay	(Spain) Roberto Carballés Baena	6–3, 6–3
Win	7–4	Jun 2011	Furth, Germany	Challenger	Clay	(Germany) Jan-Lennard Struff	6–2, 0–6, 6–2
Win	8–4	Oct 2011	Spain F38, Sabadell	Futures	Clay	(Germany) Marcel Zimmermann	3–6, 7–6^{(7–4)}, 6–4
Win	9–4	Apr 2012	Mersin, Turkey	Challenger	Clay	(Spain) Javier Martí	6–4, 0–6, 6–4
Win	10–4	July 2012	Tampere, Finland	Challenger	Clay	(France) Éric Prodon	7–6^{(7–5)}, 6–4
Loss	10–5	Sep 2012	Como, Italy	Challenger	Clay	(Austria) Andreas Haider-Maurer	3–6, 4–6
Win	11–5	Jun 2013	Furth, Germany	Challenger	Clay	(United States) Wayne Odesnik	3–6, 6–3, 6–4
Loss	11–6	Jul 2013	San Benedetto, Italy	Challenger	Clay	(Slovakia) Andrej Martin	4–6, 3–6
Win	12–6	Jul 2013	Guimarães, Portugal	Challenger	Hard	(Romania) Marius Copil	6–3, 6–0
Loss	12–7	Oct 2021	Brest, France	Challenger	Hard (i)	(United States) Brandon Nakashima	3–6, 3–6
Loss	12–8	Nov 2021	Helsinki, Finland	Challenger	Hard (i)	(Slovakia) Alex Molčan	3–6, 2–6

=== Doubles: 14 (11–3) ===
Legend ATP Challenger (2–1) ITF Futures (9–2)	Finals by surface Hard (4–1) Clay (6–2) Grass (0–0) Carpet (1–0)

Result	W–L	Date	Tournament	Tier	Surface	Partner	Opponents	Score
Win	1–0	Feb 2008	Spain F4, Murcia	Futures	Clay	(Spain) Bartolomé Salvá Vidal	(Greece) Alexandros Jakupovic (Spain) Carles Poch Gradin	6–7^{(5–7)}, 6–1, [10–2]
Loss	1–1	May 2008	Spain F20, Valldoreix	Futures	Clay	(Portugal) Frederico Marques	(Spain) Pedro Clar (Spain) Carles Poch Gradin	1–6, 2–6
Win	2–1	Aug 2008	Spain F30, Bakio	Futures	Hard	(Spain) Georgi Rumenov Payakov	(Spain) A. Boje-Ordonez (Spain) A. Vivanco-Guzman	7–6^{(8–6)}, 6–4
Win	3–1	Aug 2009	Spain F28, Irun	Futures	Clay	(Spain) Georgi Rumenov Payakov	(Portugal) Gonçalo Falcão (Israel) Saar Steele	6–2, 6–3
Win	4–1	Sep 2009	Portugal F5, Espinho	Futures	Clay	(Portugal) Gonçalo Falcão	(Spain) Jordi Marse-Vidri (Australia) Allen Perel	7–5, 6–3
Win	5–1	May 2010	Spain F18, Adeje	Futures	Hard	(Spain) Georgi Rumenov Payakov	(Spain) A. Boje-Ordonez (Spain) M. Palacios-Siegenthale	6–1, 6–4
Win	6–1	Jun 2010	Spain F19, Lanzarote	Futures	Hard	(Spain) Georgi Rumenov Payakov	(Switzerland) Michael Lammer (France) Ludovic Walter	7–6^{(7–4)}, 6–0
Win	7–1	Jun 2010	Spain F20, Puerto de la Cruz	Futures	Carpet	(Spain) Georgi Rumenov Payakov	(Spain) Carlos Gómez-Herrera (Spain) Roberto Ortega Olmedo	7–6^{(7–2)}, 6–2
Win	8–1	Aug 2010	Tampere, Finland	Challenger	Clay	(Portugal) Leonardo Tavares	(Latvia) Andis Juška (Latvia) Deniss Pavlovs	7–6^{(7–3)}, 7–5
Win	9–1	Oct 2010	Spain F36, Córdoba	Futures	Hard	(Spain) Israel Vior-Diaz	(Spain) Enrique López Pérez (Spain) Ivan Arenas-Gualda	7–6^{(8–6)}, 4–6, [10–3]
Loss	9–2	Oct 2011	Spain F36, Córdoba	Futures	Hard	(Spain) Gerard Granollers Pujol	(Spain) M-A López Jaén (Spain) Gabriel Trujillo Soler	4–6, 4–6
Win	10–2	Oct 2011	Spain F38, Sabadell	Futures	Clay	(Canada) Steven Diez	(Spain) M-A López Jaén (Spain) Gabriel Trujillo Soler	6–3, 3–6, [10–7]
Win	11–2	Jun 2012	Furth, Germany	Challenger	Clay	(Spain) Arnau Brugués Davi	(Australia) Rameez Junaid (India) Purav Raja	7–5, 6–7^{(4–7)}, [11–9]
Loss	11–3	Jul 2013	San Benedetto, Italy	Challenger	Clay	(Italy) Alessandro Giannessi	(France) Pierre-Hugues Herbert (France) Maxime Teixeira	4–6, 3–6

== Grand Slam singles seedings ==
Not seeded at all, or not seeded inside the top 10 Seeded 10–4 Seeded no. 3 Seeded no. 2 Seeded no. 1

Year	Australian Open	French Open	Wimbledon	US Open
2012	absent	unseeded	absent	absent
2013	unseeded	unseeded	absent	unseeded
2014	unseeded	unseeded	unseeded	32nd
2015	unseeded	unseeded	unseeded	unseeded
2016	32nd	26th	31st	unseeded
2017	unseeded	unseeded	unseeded	unseeded
2018	unseeded	unseeded	unseeded	unseeded
2019	unseeded	unseeded	unseeded	unseeded
2020	unseeded	unseeded	not held	unseeded
2021	absent	unseeded	unseeded	absent

== Head-to-head against top 10 players ==
This section contains Sousa's win-loss record against players who have been ranked 10th or higher in the world rankings during their careers.

Opponent	MP	Won	Lost	Win %	Last match	Ref
Number 1 ranked players						
(Russia) Daniil Medvedev	3	1	2	33%	Lost (1–6, 1–6) at the 2019 Monte-Carlo Masters	
(Australia) Lleyton Hewitt	1	0	1	0%	Lost (1–6, 6–7^{(3–7)}) at the 2013 Miami Masters	
(Switzerland) Roger Federer	2	0	2	0%	Lost (4–6, 3–6) at the 2019 Rome Masters	
(Spain) Rafael Nadal	3	0	3	0%	Lost (2–6, 2–6, 2–6) at the 2019 Wimbledon Championships	
(Serbia) Novak Djokovic	6	0	6	0%	Lost (5–7, 1–6) at the 2018 Paris Masters	
(United Kingdom) Andy Murray	7	0	7	0%	Lost (2–6, 6–3, 2–6, 2–6) at the 2016 Australian Open	
Number 2 ranked players						
(Germany) Alexander Zverev	2	1	1	50%	Won (7–5, 5–7, 6–4) at the 2018 Indian Wells Masters	
(Norway) Casper Ruud	3	0	3	0%	Lost (6–7^{(3–7)}, 6–4, 6–7^{(1–7)}) at 2022 Geneva	
Number 3 ranked players						
(Greece) Stefanos Tsitsipas	1	1	0	100%	Won (6–4, 1–6, 7–6^{(7–4)}) at the 2018 Estoril Open	
(Bulgaria) Grigor Dimitrov	3	1	2	33%	Lost (4–6, 1–6, 6–3, 2–6) at the 2016 US Open	
(Spain) David Ferrer	3	1	2	33%	Lost (2–6, 2–6) at the 2018 Auckland Open	
(Croatia) Marin Čilić	5	1	4	20%	Won (6–4, 6–4, 6–4) at the 2019 Wimbledon Championships	
(Austria) Dominic Thiem	8	1	7	13%	Lost (2–6, 0–6) at the 2022 Gijón Open	
(Argentina) Juan Martín del Potro	3	0	3	0%	Lost (2–6, 2–6) at the 2017 Paris Masters	
(Switzerland) Stan Wawrinka	4	0	4	0%	Lost (6–7^{(1–7)}, 2–6) at the 2022 Metz	
(Canada) Milos Raonic	4	0	4	0%	Lost (5–7, 6–4, 2–6) at the 2018 Indian Wells Masters	
Number 4 ranked players						
(Japan) Kei Nishikori	4	1	3	25%	Lost (7–6^{(7–5)}, 3–6, 2–6) at the 2021 Indian Wells Masters	
(Czech Republic) Tomáš Berdych	3	0	3	0%	Lost (3–6, 6–3, 5–7) at the 2016 Paris Masters	
Number 5 ranked players						
(South Africa) Kevin Anderson	2	1	1	50%	Won (4–6, 6–7^{(6–8)}) at the 2019 Miami Masters	
(Russia) Andrey Rublev	2	1	1	50%	Lost (0–6, 4–6) at the 2018 Beijing Open	
(France) Jo-Wilfried Tsonga	1	0	1	0%	Lost (6–7^{(1–7)}, 2–6) at the 2017 St. Petersburg Open	
Number 6 ranked players						
(France) Gilles Simon	3	1	2	33%	Lost (4–6, 1–6) at the 2015 Nottingham Open	
(France) Gaël Monfils	5	1	4	20%	Lost (2–6, 3–6) at the 2020 Rotterdam Open	
Number 7 ranked players						
(France) Richard Gasquet	2	1	1	50%	Lost (6–7^{(7–9)}, 2–6, 6–4, 6–4, 3–6) at 2022 Wimbledon	
(Belgium) David Goffin	6	1	5	17%	Lost (3–6, 2–6) at the 2019 Estoril Open	
Number 8 ranked players						
(Russia) Mikhail Youzhny	2	2	0	100%	Won (4–6, 6–4, 7–6^{(10–8)}) at the 2018 Indian Wells Masters	
(Serbia) Janko Tipsarević	1	1	0	100%	Won (4–6, 7–6^{(7–3)}, 6–2, 6–2) at the 2017 French Open	
(Cyprus) Marcos Baghdatis	1	1	0	100%	Won (6–1, 7–5) at the 2017 Auckland Open	
(Canada) Félix Auger-Aliassime	1	1	0	100%	Won (6–4, 6–7^{(5–7)}, 6–4) at 2019 Chengdu	
(Argentina) Diego Schwartzman	1	1	0	100%	Won (4–6, 6–3, 6–4) at the 2018 Indian Wells Masters	
(Austria) Jürgen Melzer	4	3	1	75%	Won (6–4, 6–4) at the 2015 Geneva Open	
(Russia) Karen Khachanov	2	1	1	50%	Won (7–6^{(7–6)}, 6–4) at the 2019 St. Petersburg Open	
(United States) Jack Sock	2	1	1	50%	Lost (3–6, 7–5, 3–6) at the 2017 Auckland Open	
(United States) John Isner	1	0	1	0%	Lost (5–7, 3–6) at the 2015 Rome Masters	
(United Kingdom) Cameron Norrie	3	0	3	0%	Lost (4–6, 4–6, 6–7^{(4–7)}) at the 2022 US Open	
Number 9 ranked players						
(Spain) Roberto Bautista Agut	5	3	3	50%	Won (4–6, 6–3, 7–5 ) at the 2019 Swiss Open	
(Poland) Hubert Hurkacz	2	1	1	50%	Lost (3–6, 5–7) at 2020 Kitzbühel	
(Italy) Fabio Fognini	6	1	5	17%	Lost (4–6, 4–6) at the 2017 Madrid Masters	
(Italy) Jannik Sinner	1	0	1	0%	Lost (4–6, 5–7, 1–6) at the 2022 Australian Open	
(Spain) Nicolás Almagro	1	0	1	0%	Lost (6–4, 1–6, 2–6) at the 2016 Estoril Open	
Number 10 ranked players						
(France) Lucas Pouille	1	1	0	100%	Won (7–6^{(7–5)}, 4–6, 7–6^{(7–4)}, 7–6^{(7–5)}) at the 2018 US Open	
(Spain) Pablo Carreño Busta	4	2	2	50%	Lost (3–6, 1–6, 2–6) at the 2019 French Open	
(Canada) Denis Shapovalov	2	1	1	50%	Lost (6–2, 3–6, 2–6) at the 2019 Cincinnati Masters	
(Argentina) Juan Mónaco	1	0	1	0%	Lost (2–6, 6–7^{(4–7)}) at the 2014 Shanghai Masters	
(Latvia) Ernests Gulbis	3	0	3	0%	Lost (2–6, 5–7, 3–6) at the 2016 French Open	
Total	131	34	97	25.95%	Statistics correct as of 11 October 2022	

== Wins over top 10 players ==
=== Singles ===
- Sousa has a 5–33 record against players who were, at the time the match was played, ranked in the top 10.

Type	2013	...	2016	2017	2018	2019	Total
Wins	1		1	0	2	1	5

#	Player	Rank	Event	Surface	Rd	Score	JSR
2013
1.	(Spain) David Ferrer	4	Malaysian Open, Malaysia	Hard	QF	6–2, 7–6^{(8–6)}	77
2016
2.	(Japan) Kei Nishikori	5	Japan Open, Japan	Hard	2R	3–4 ret.	34
2018
3.	(Germany) Alexander Zverev	5	Indian Wells Masters, United States	Hard	2R	7–5, 5–7, 6–4	85
4.	(Belgium) David Goffin	9	Miami Open, United States	Hard	2R	6–0, 6–1	80
2019
5.	(Russia) Karen Khachanov	9	St. Petersburg Open, Russia	Hard (i)	2R	7–6^{(7–2)}, 6–4	64

=== Doubles ===
- Sousa has a 4–13 record against players who were, at the time the match was played, ranked in the top 10.

Type	2014	...	2018	2019	Total
Wins	2		1	1	4

#	Partner	Opponent	Rank	Event	Surface	Rd	Score	JSR
2014
1.	(Czech Republic) Lukáš Rosol	(United States) Bob Bryan (United States) Mike Bryan	1; 1	Sydney International, Australia	Hard	QF	3–6, 6–3, [14–12]	633
2.	(Argentina) Leonardo Mayer	(Austria) Alexander Peya (Brazil) Bruno Soares	5; 5	Valencia Open, Spain	Hard	1R	3–6, 6–1, [10–7]	97
2018
3.	(Argentina) Leonardo Mayer	(Austria) Oliver Marach (Croatia) Mate Pavić	2; 3	US Open, New York, US	Hard	1R	3–6, 7–6^{(7–5)}, 7–5	54
2019
4.	(Argentina) Guido Pella	(Poland) Łukasz Kubot (Brazil) Marcelo Melo	4; 7	Madrid Open, Madrid, Spain	Clay	QF	6–2, 6–2	29

== Career earnings ==
Year	Major titles	ATP titles	Total titles	Earnings
2007	0	0	0	$3,610
2008	0	0	0	$16,613
2009	0	0	0	$13,010
2010	0	0	0	$28,768
2011	0	0	0	$56,847
2012	0	0	0	$128,391
2013	0	1	1	$496,684
2014	0	0	0	$771,828
2015	0	1	1	$919,929
2016	0	0	0	$1,084,466
2017	0	0	0	$776,600
2018	0	1	1	$1,233,369
2019	0	0	0	$191,550
2020	0	0	0	$307,454
2021	0	0	0	$255,169
Career	0	3	3	$7,340,832

== National participation ==
=== Davis Cup (37 wins, 26 losses) ===
Sousa debuted for the Portugal Davis Cup team in the 2008 season and has played 52 matches in 25 ties. His singles record is 23–12 and his doubles record is 8–9 (31–21 overall).

Group membership World Group (0–0) WG Play-off (1–5) Group I (21–17) Group II (15–4) Group III (0–0) Group IV (0–0)	Matches by surface Hard (18–19) Clay (19–7) Grass (0–0) Carpet (0–0)	Matches by type Singles (26–16) Doubles (11–10)	Matches by setting Indoors (i) (21–18) Outdoors (16–8)	Matches by venue Portugal (21–8) Away (16–18)

- ▲ ▼ indicates the result of the Davis Cup match followed by the score, date, place of event, the zonal classification and its phase, and the court surface.

Rubber result	Rubber	Match type (partner if any)	Opponent nation	Opponent player(s)	Score
▲5–0; 18–20 July 2008; Lawn Tennis Club da Foz, Porto, Portugal; Group II Europe/Africa quarterfinal; clay surface
Victory	IV	Singles (dead rubber)	Cyprus	Eleftherios Christou	6–3, 6–3
▼0–5; 19–21 September 2008; Megaron Tennis Club, Dnipropetrovsk, Ukraine; Group II Europe/Africa semifinal; hard (i) surface
Defeat	V	Singles (dead rubber)	Ukraine	Illya Marchenko	3–6, 3–6
▼2–3; 6–8 March 2009; National Tennis Centre, Nicosia, Cyprus; Group II Europe/Africa first round; hard surface
Victory	V	Singles (dead rubber)	Cyprus	Philippos Tsangaridis	6–3, 6–1
▲5–0; 10–12 July 2009; Office des parc Omnisport Wilaya d'Oran, Oran, Algeria; Group II Europe/Africa relegation play-off; clay surface
Victory	V	Singles (dead rubber)	Algeria	Sid-Ali Akkal	6–3, 6–0
▲5–0; 9–11 July 2010; Centro de Tenis do Jamor, Cruz Quebrada, Portugal; Group II Europe/Africa quarterfinal; clay surface
Victory	IV	Singles (dead rubber)	Cyprus	Eleftherios Christou	6–1, 6–0
▲3–2; 17–19 September 2010; Centro de Tenis do Jamor, Cruz Quebrada, Portugal; Group II Europe/Africa semifinal; clay surface
Defeat	V	Singles (dead rubber)	Bosnia and Herzegovina	Damir Džumhur	6–4, 4–6, 1–6
▲4–1; 4–6 March 2011; Centro Desportivo Nacional do Jamor, Cruz Quebrada, Portugal; Group I Europe/Africa first round; clay surface
Victory	V	Singles (dead rubber)	Slovakia	Martin Kližan	6–2, 4–1, ret
▼0–5; 8–10 July 2011; PostFinance-Arena, Bern, Switzerland; Group I Europe/Africa quarterfinal; hard(i) surface
Defeat	IV	Singles (dead rubber)	Switzerland	Marco Chiudinelli	3–6, 4–6
▼2–3; 6–8 April 2012; Canada Stadium, Ramat HaSharon, Israel; Group I Europe/Africa quarterfinal; hard surface
Defeat	III	Doubles (with Gastão Elias)	Israel	Andy Ram / Jonathan Erlich	4–6, 4–6, 3–6
Victory	IV	Singles (dead rubber)	Israel	Andy Ram	7–5, 6–0
▼1–3; 14–16 September 2012; Aegon Arena, Bratislava, Slovakia; Group I Europe/Africa relegation play-off; hard(i) surface
Victory	II	Singles	Slovakia	Lukáš Lacko	6–4, 6–4, 6–3
Defeat	III	Doubles (with Gastão Elias)	Slovakia	Michal Mertiňák / Filip Polášek	5–7, 6–4, 6–7^{(5–7)}, 3–6
Defeat	IV	Singles	Slovakia	Martin Kližan	2–6, 5–7, 7–6^{(11–9)}, 1–6
▲5–0; 1–3 February 2013; Club Internacional de Football, Lisbon, Portugal; Group II Europe/Africa first round; clay(i) surface
Victory	I	Singles	Benin	Loic Didavi	6–1, 6–3, 6–0
Victory	III	Doubles (with Pedro Sousa)	Benin	Alexis Klegou / Loic Didavi	6–2, 6–1, 6–1
▲3–2; 13–15 September 2013; Manejul de Atletica Usoara, Chișinău, Moldova; Group II Europe/Africa semifinal; hard(i) surface
Victory	II	Singles	Moldova	Maxim Dubarenco	6–7^{(4–7)}, 7–6^{(7–4)}, 6–1, 6–4
Victory	III	Doubles (with Gastão Elias)	Moldova	Andrei Ciumac / Roman Borvanov	6–3, 6–4, 6–3
Defeat	IV	Singles	Moldova	Radu Albot	6–3, 6–3, 3–6, 4–6, 9–11
▼2–3; 31 January – 2 February 2014; Teniski klub Triglav Kranj, Kranj, Slovenia; Group I Europe/Africa first round; hard(i) surface
Victory	I	Singles	Slovenia	Janež Semrajč	6–1, 6–4, 4–6, 6–0
Defeat	III	Doubles (with Gastão Elias)	Slovenia	Blaž Kavčič / Grega Žemlja	3–6, 5–7, 6–7^{(5–7)}
Defeat	IV	Singles	Slovenia	Blaž Kavčič	5–7, 5–7, 2–6
▼1–4; 12–14 September 2014; Olympic Stadium, Moscow, Russia; Group I Europe/Africa relegation play-off; hard(i) surface
Defeat	II	Singles	Russia	Evgeny Donskoy	6–7^{(7–9)}, 4–6, 6–3, 1–6
Defeat	III	Doubles (with Gastão Elias)	Russia	Konstantin Kravchuk / Andrey Rublev	3–6, 4–6, 4–6
▲4–1; 6–8 March 2015; Centro Desportivo do Jamor, Cruz Quebrada, Portugal; Group II Europe/Africa first round; hard(i) surface
Victory	I	Singles	Morocco	Yassine Idmbarek	6–0, 6–0, 6–2
Victory	III	Doubles (with Frederico Ferreira Silva)	Morocco	Lamine Ouahab / Younès Rachidi	7–6^{(8–6)}, 6–0, 6–1
▲4–1; 17–19 July 2015; Clube de Ténis de Viana, Viana do Castelo, Portugal; Group II Europe/Africa quarterfinal; clay surface
Victory	I	Singles	Finland	Henrik Sillanpää	6–0, 6–2, 6–0
Victory	III	Doubles (with Gastão Elias)	Finland	Henri Kontinen / Jarkko Nieminen	3–6, 7–6^{(7–5)}, 6–3, 6–4
Victory	IV	Singles	Finland	Jarkko Nieminen	6–3, 6–3, 6–4
▲3–2; 18–20 September 2015; Clube de Ténis de Viana, Viana do Castelo, Portugal; Group II Europe/Africa semifinal; clay surface
Defeat	I	Singles	Belarus	Egor Gerasimov	6–0, 6–1, 2–6, 2–6, 4–6
Victory	III	Doubles (with Gastão Elias)	Belarus	Sergey Betov / Max Mirnyi	7–6^{(7–3)}, 4–6, 6–3, 6–7^{(5–7)}, 6–3
Victory	IV	Singles	Belarus	Uladzimir Ignatik	6–1, 6–1, 6–4
▼1–4; 4–6 March 2016; Pavilhão Vitória Sport Clube, Guimarães, Portugal; Group I Europe/Africa first round; hard(i) surface
Victory	I	Singles	Austria	Gerald Melzer	6–1, 7–5, 6–2
Defeat	III	Doubles (with Gastão Elias)	Austria	Alexander Peya / Dominic Thiem	7–6^{(8–6)}, 7–6^{(7–4)}, 1–6, 3–6, 4–6
Defeat	IV	Singles	Austria	Dominic Thiem	2–6, 4–6, 2–6
▲5–0; 16–18 September 2016; Clube de Ténis de Viana, Viana do Castelo, Portugal; Group I Europe/Africa second round playoffs; clay surface
Victory	I	Singles	Slovenia	Tom Kočevar-Dešman	6–7^{(5–7)}, 7–6^{(7–3)}, 6–2, 6–1
Victory	III	Doubles (with Gastão Elias)	Slovenia	Tom Kočevar-Dešman / Grega Žemlja	6–4, 6–4, 6–4
▲5–0; 3–5 February 2017; Club Internacional de Foot-ball, Lisbon, Portugal; Group I Europe/Africa first round; clay(i) surface
Victory	I	Singles	Israel	Yishai Oliel	6–1, 6–1, 6–2
Victory	III	Doubles (with Gastão Elias)	Israel	Jonathan Erlich / Dudi Sela	7–5, 6–7^{(4–7)}, 4–6, 6–2, 6–4
▲4–1; 7–9 April 2017; Club Internacional de Foot-ball, Lisbon, Portugal; Group I Europe/Africa second round; clay(i) surface
Victory	II	Singles	Ukraine	Nikita Mashtakov	6–0, 6–3, 6–0
Defeat	III	Doubles (with Gastão Elias)	Ukraine	Denys Molchanov / Artem Smirnov	7–5, 1–6, 3–6, 4–6
Victory	IV	Singles	Ukraine	Artem Smirnov	7–6^{(7–3)}, 7–6^{(7–2)}, 6–2
▼2–3; 15–17 September 2017; Clube de Ténis do Jamor, Oeiras, Portugal; World Group play-off; clay surface
Defeat	I	Singles	Germany	Cedrik-Marcel Stebe	6–4, 3–6, 3–6, 0–6
Defeat	III	Doubles (with Gastão Elias)	Germany	Tim Pütz / Jan-Lennard Struff	2–6, 6–4, 7–6^{(7–5)}, 4–6, 4–6
Defeat	IV	Singles	Germany	Jan-Lennard Struff	0–6, 7–6^{(7–3)}, 6–3, 6–7^{(6–8)}, 4–6
▼2–3; 6–7 April 2018; Kungliga tennishallen, Stockholm, Sweden; Group I Europe/Africa second round; hard (i) surface
Victory	I	Singles	Sweden	Mikael Ymer	6–4, 6–4
Defeat	III	Doubles (with Gastão Elias)	Sweden	Markus Eriksson / Robert Lindstedt	6–7^{(6–8)}, 2–6
Victory	IV	Singles	Sweden	Elias Ymer	6–4, 6–4
▼1–3; 14–15 September 2018; Campa Tennis Club, Bucha, Ukraine; Group I Europe/Africa relegation play-off first round; hard surface
Victory	I	Singles	Ukraine	Illya Marchenko	4–6, 6–2, 6–3
Defeat	III	Doubles (with Gastão Elias)	Ukraine	Denys Molchanov / Sergiy Stakhovsky	4–6, 6–3, 6–7^{(5–7)}
Defeat	IV	Singles	Ukraine	Sergiy Stakhovsky	2–6, 6–4, 4–6
▲4–0; 19–20 October 2018; Club Internacional de Foot-ball, Lisbon, Portugal; Group I Europe/Africa relegation play-off second round; clay surface
Victory	II	Singles	South Africa	Nicolaas Scholtz	6–3, 6–2
Victory	III	Doubles (with Gastão Elias)	South Africa	Raven Klaasen / Ruan Roelofse	6–4, 6–7^{(4–7)}, 6–2
▼1–3; 1–2 February 2019; Daulet National Tennis Centre, Astana, Kazakhstan; qualifying round; hard (i) surface
Defeat	I	Singles	Kazakhstan	Alexander Bublik	7–6^{(7–1)}, 4–6, 4–6
Victory	III	Doubles (with Gastão Elias)	Kazakhstan	Timur Khabibulin / Aleksandr Nedovyesov	3–6, 6–3, 6–4
Defeat	IV	Singles	Kazakhstan	Mikhail Kukushkin	4–6, 1–6
▼2–3; 13–14 September 2019; Republic Olympic Tennis Center, Minsk, Belarus; Group I Europe/Africa relegation play-off; hard (i) surface
Victory	I	Singles	Belarus	Ilya Ivashka	4–6, 6–1, 6–2
Victory	III	Doubles (with Pedro Sousa)	Belarus	Ilya Ivashka / Andrei Vasilevski	6–3, 7–6^{(8–6)}
Defeat	IV	Singles	Belarus	Egor Gerasimov	6–7^{(3–7)}, 4–6
▲4–0; 6–7 March 2020; Šiauliai Tennis Academy, Šiauliai, Lithuania; World Group I play-off; hard (i) surface
Victory	II	Singles	Lithuania	Julius Tverijonas	6–1, 6–3
Victory	III	Doubles (with Pedro Sousa)	Lithuania	Laurynas Grigelis / Lukas Mugevičius	6–3, 6–1
▼1–3; 18–19 September 2021; Horia Demian Sports Hall, Cluj-Napoca, Romania; World Group I; hard (i) surface
Victory	I	Singles	Romania	Filip Jianu	6–3, 7–5
Defeat	III	Doubles (with Nuno Borges)	Romania	Marius Copil / Horia Tecău	4–6, 3–6
Defeat	IV	Singles	Romania	Marius Copil	3–6, 6–2, 4–6
