= 2018 BNP Paribas Open – Women's doubles =

Women's doubles
- 2018 BNP Paribas Open

Final
- Champions: (Chinese Taipei) Hsieh Su-wei (Czech Republic) Barbora Strýcová
- Runners-up: (Russia) Ekaterina Makarova (Russia) Elena Vesnina
- Score: 6–4, 6–4

Events
Singles	men	women
Doubles	men	women
← 2017 ·	BNP Paribas Open	· 2019 →

Latisha Chan and Martina Hingis were the defending champions, but Hingis retired from professional tennis at the end of 2017. Chan played alongside her sister Chan Hao-ching, but lost in the second round to Hsieh Su-wei and Barbora Strýcová.

Hsieh and Strýcová went on to win the title, defeating Ekaterina Makarova and Elena Vesnina in the final, 6–4, 6–4.

== Seeds ==
1. (Russia) Ekaterina Makarova / (Russia) Elena Vesnina (final)
2. (Chinese Taipei) Chan Hao-ching / (Chinese Taipei) Latisha Chan (second round)
3. (Canada) Gabriela Dabrowski / (China) Xu Yifan (semifinals)
4. (Hungary) Tímea Babos / (France) Kristina Mladenovic (semifinals)
5. (Romania) Monica Niculescu / (Czech Republic) Andrea Sestini Hlaváčková (quarterfinals)
6. (Czech Republic) Barbora Krejčíková / (Czech Republic) Kateřina Siniaková (second round)
7. (Netherlands) Kiki Bertens / (Sweden) Johanna Larsson (first round)
8. (Slovenia) Andreja Klepač / (Spain) María José Martínez Sánchez (quarterfinals)

== Draw ==
=== Key ===
- Q = Qualifier
- WC = Wild card
- LL = Lucky loser
- Alt = Alternate
- SE = Special exempt
- PR = Protected ranking
- ITF = ITF entry
- JE = Junior exempt
- w/o = Walkover
- r = Retired
- d = Defaulted
- SR = Special ranking

=== Finals ===
Semifinals
1	(Russia) Ekaterina Makarova (Russia) Elena Vesnina	6	6
4	(Hungary) Tímea Babos (France) Kristina Mladenovic	4	2
3	(Canada) Gabriela Dabrowski (China) Xu Yifan	6^{2}	3
(Chinese Taipei) Hsieh Su-wei (Czech Republic) Barbora Strýcová	7^{7}	6

Final
1	(Russia) Ekaterina Makarova (Russia) Elena Vesnina	4	4
(Chinese Taipei) Hsieh Su-wei (Czech Republic) Barbora Strýcová	6	6

=== Top half ===
First round
1	(Russia) E Makarova (Russia) E Vesnina	6	6
(Australia) D Gavrilova (Australia) S Stosur	2	1
WC	(Belarus) V Azarenka (Belarus) A Sabalenka	7^{7}	2	[10]
WC	(Canada) E Bouchard (United States) S Stephens	6^{3}	6	[7]
(Russia) D Kasatkina (Russia) A Pavlyuchenkova	2	3
(Spain) L Arruabarrena (Spain) A Parra Santonja	6	6
(Belgium) E Mertens (Netherlands) D Schuurs	7^{7}	6
7	(Netherlands) K Bertens (Sweden) J Larsson	6^{5}	4
4	(Hungary) T Babos (France) K Mladenovic	7^{7}	6
(Ukraine) N Kichenok (Australia) An Rodionova	6^{3}	0
(Romania) R Olaru (Ukraine) O Savchuk	4	6	[6]
(Ukraine) K Bondarenko (Serbia) A Krunić	6	4	[10]
(United Kingdom) A Smith (Czech Republic) R Voráčová	2	3
(Japan) S Aoyama (China) Z Yang	6	6
WC	(Czech Republic) Ka Plíšková (Czech Republic) Kr Plíšková	2	6	[4]
5	(Romania) M Niculescu (Czech Republic) A Sestini Hlaváčková	6	2	[10]

Second round
1	(Russia) E Makarova (Russia) E Vesnina	6	6
WC	(Belarus) V Azarenka (Belarus) A Sabalenka	4	3
(Spain) L Arruabarrena (Spain) A Parra Santonja	6^{2}	6	[10]
(Belgium) E Mertens (Netherlands) D Schuurs	7^{7}	2	[7]
4	(Hungary) T Babos (France) K Mladenovic	6	7
(Ukraine) K Bondarenko (Serbia) A Krunić	1	5
(Japan) S Aoyama (China) Z Yang	2	5
5	(Romania) M Niculescu (Czech Republic) A Sestini Hlaváčková	6	7

Quarterfinals
1	(Russia) E Makarova (Russia) E Vesnina	6	6
(Spain) L Arruabarrena (Spain) A Parra Santonja	2	2
4	(Hungary) T Babos (France) K Mladenovic	6	6
5	(Romania) M Niculescu (Czech Republic) A Sestini Hlaváčková	4	3

Semifinals
1	(Russia) E Makarova (Russia) E Vesnina	6	6
4	(Hungary) T Babos (France) K Mladenovic	4	2

=== Bottom half ===
First round
8	(Slovenia) A Klepač (Spain) MJ Martínez Sánchez	6	6
(Belgium) K Flipkens (Serbia) N Stojanović	0	4
(Australia) M Adamczak (Croatia) D Jurak	6^{8}	5
(United States) R Atawo (Germany) A-L Grönefeld	7^{10}	7
(United States) N Melichar (Czech Republic) K Peschke	6	1	[10]
(Romania) I-C Begu (Romania) S Halep	3	6	[3]
(Australia) A Barty (United States) C Vandeweghe	6	1	[6]
3	(Canada) G Dabrowski (China) Y Xu	1	6	[10]
6	(Czech Republic) B Krejčíková (Czech Republic) K Siniaková	6	5	[10]
(Romania) M Buzărnescu (France) A Cornet	1	7	[3]
(United States) V King (Slovenia) K Srebotnik	6	4	[14]
(Ukraine) L Kichenok (Russia) A Kudryavtseva	3	6	[12]
(Poland) A Rosolska (United States) A Spears	6	4	[8]
(Chinese Taipei) S-w Hsieh (Czech Republic) B Strýcová	3	6	[10]
(Latvia) J Ostapenko (Latvia) A Sevastova	2	3
2	(Chinese Taipei) H-c Chan (Chinese Taipei) L Chan	6	6

Second round
8	(Slovenia) A Klepač (Spain) MJ Martínez Sánchez	6	6
(United States) R Atawo (Germany) A-L Grönefeld	0	3
(United States) N Melichar (Czech Republic) K Peschke	4	5
3	(Canada) G Dabrowski (China) Y Xu	6	7
6	(Czech Republic) B Krejčíková (Czech Republic) K Siniaková	3	5
(United States) V King (Slovenia) K Srebotnik	6	7
(Chinese Taipei) S-w Hsieh (Czech Republic) B Strýcová	6	5	[10]
2	(Chinese Taipei) H-c Chan (Chinese Taipei) L Chan	4	7	[6]

Quarterfinals
8	(Slovenia) A Klepač (Spain) MJ Martínez Sánchez	6^{7}	7	[10]
3	(Canada) G Dabrowski (China) Y Xu	7^{9}	5	[12]
(United States) V King (Slovenia) K Srebotnik	4	1
(Chinese Taipei) S-w Hsieh (Czech Republic) B Strýcová	6	6

Semifinals
3	(Canada) G Dabrowski (China) Y Xu	6^{2}	3
(Chinese Taipei) S-w Hsieh (Czech Republic) B Strýcová	7^{7}	6
