= 2018 BNP Paribas Open – Men's doubles =

Men's doubles
- 2018 BNP Paribas Open

Final
- Champions: (United States) John Isner (United States) Jack Sock
- Runners-up: (United States) Bob Bryan (United States) Mike Bryan
- Score: 7–6^{(7–4)}, 7–6^{(7–2)}

Events
Singles	men	women
Doubles	men	women
← 2017 ·	BNP Paribas Open	· 2019 →

Raven Klaasen and Rajeev Ram were the defending champions, but chose not to participate together. Klaasen played alongside Michael Venus, but lost in the second round to Ivan Dodig and Ram. Dodig and Ram lost in the quarterfinals to John Isner and Jack Sock.

Isner and Sock went on to win the title, defeating Bob and Mike Bryan in the final, 7–6^{(7–4)}, 7–6^{(7–2)}.

== Seeds ==
1. (Poland) Łukasz Kubot / (Brazil) Marcelo Melo (first round)
2. (Finland) Henri Kontinen / (Australia) John Peers (first round)
3. (Austria) Oliver Marach / (Croatia) Mate Pavić (semifinals)
4. (United Kingdom) Jamie Murray / (Brazil) Bruno Soares (second round)
5. (France) Pierre-Hugues Herbert / (France) Nicolas Mahut (second round)
6. (Netherlands) Jean-Julien Rojer / (Romania) Horia Tecău (second round)
7. (United States) Bob Bryan / (United States) Mike Bryan (final)
8. (Croatia) Ivan Dodig / (United States) Rajeev Ram (quarterfinals)

== Draw ==
=== Key ===
- Q = Qualifier
- WC = Wild card
- LL = Lucky loser
- Alt = Alternate
- SE = Special exempt
- PR = Protected ranking
- ITF = ITF entry
- JE = Junior exempt
- w/o = Walkover
- r = Retired
- d = Defaulted
- SR = Special ranking

=== Finals ===
Semifinals
(United States) John Isner (United States) Jack Sock	6	6
3	(Austria) Oliver Marach (Croatia) Mate Pavić	3	2
(Uruguay) Pablo Cuevas (Argentina) Horacio Zeballos	6^{5}	4
7	(United States) Bob Bryan (United States) Mike Bryan	7^{7}	6

Final
(United States) John Isner (United States) Jack Sock	7^{7}	7^{7}
7	(United States) Bob Bryan (United States) Mike Bryan	6^{4}	6^{2}

=== Top half ===
First round
1	(Poland) Ł Kubot (Brazil) M Melo	4	4
(Spain) R Bautista Agut (Spain) D Ferrer	6	6
(Spain) A Ramos Viñolas (Spain) F Verdasco	3	6^{6}
(United States) J Isner (United States) J Sock	6	7^{8}
(South Africa) R Klaasen (New Zealand) M Venus	4	6	[10]
(Colombia) JS Cabal (Colombia) R Farah	6	0	[5]
(Japan) B McLachlan (Chile) J Peralta	6	3	[5]
8	(Croatia) I Dodig (United States) R Ram	4	6	[10]
3	(Austria) O Marach (Croatia) M Pavić	7^{7}	6
WC	(United States) S Johnson (Canada) D Nestor	6^{4}	3
(Italy) F Fognini (Pakistan) A-u-H Qureshi	2	6	[10]
(Croatia) N Mektić (Austria) A Peya	6	3	[5]
(Spain) F López (Spain) M López	6	6
(Argentina) JM del Potro (Bulgaria) G Dimitrov	4	2
(United States) R Harrison (Belarus) M Mirnyi	6^{5}	4
6	(Netherlands) J-J Rojer (Romania) H Tecău	7^{7}	6

Second round
(Spain) R Bautista Agut (Spain) D Ferrer
(United States) J Isner (United States) J Sock	w/o
(South Africa) R Klaasen (New Zealand) M Venus	2	2
8	(Croatia) I Dodig (United States) R Ram	6	6
3	(Austria) O Marach (Croatia) M Pavić	7	6
(Italy) F Fognini (Pakistan) A-u-H Qureshi	5	2
(Spain) F López (Spain) M López	6	7^{7}
6	(Netherlands) J-J Rojer (Romania) H Tecău	4	6^{5}

Quarterfinals
(United States) J Isner (United States) J Sock	7^{7}	7^{7}
8	(Croatia) I Dodig (United States) R Ram	6^{2}	6^{2}
3	(Austria) O Marach (Croatia) M Pavić	6	6
(Spain) F López (Spain) M López	4	4

Semifinals
(United States) J Isner (United States) J Sock	6	6
3	(Austria) O Marach (Croatia) M Pavić	3	2

=== Bottom half ===
First round
5	(France) P-H Herbert (France) N Mahut	6	6
(Bosnia and Herzegovina) D Džumhur (Serbia) F Krajinović	1	2
(Mexico) S González (United States) N Monroe	7^{7}	5	[2]
(Uruguay) P Cuevas (Argentina) H Zeballos	6^{5}	7	[10]
(India) R Bopanna (France) É Roger-Vasselin	7	2	[4]
(Luxembourg) G Müller (United States) S Querrey	5	6	[10]
WC	(Germany) P Petzschner (Austria) D Thiem	3	4
4	(United Kingdom) J Murray (Brazil) B Soares	6	6
7	(United States) B Bryan (United States) M Bryan	6	4	[10]
(Germany) A Zverev (Germany) M Zverev	3	6	[1]
(United Kingdom) K Edmund (Croatia) F Škugor	6^{6}	5
(Spain) P Carreño Busta (Spain) D Marrero	7^{8}	7
(New Zealand) M Daniell (Argentina) D Schwartzman	4	6	[10]
(Germany) P Kohlschreiber (France) L Pouille	6	2	[7]
(France) A Mannarino (France) F Martin	7^{7}	3	[10]
2	(Finland) H Kontinen (Australia) J Peers	6^{4}	6	[6]

Second round
5	(France) P-H Herbert (France) N Mahut	6^{5}	6	[11]
(Uruguay) P Cuevas (Argentina) H Zeballos	7^{7}	3	[13]
(Luxembourg) G Müller (United States) S Querrey	7	6^{4}	[10]
4	(United Kingdom) J Murray (Brazil) B Soares	5	7^{7}	[2]
7	(United States) B Bryan (United States) M Bryan	6	6
(Spain) P Carreño Busta (Spain) D Marrero	2	3
(New Zealand) M Daniell (Argentina) D Schwartzman	6	6
(France) A Mannarino (France) F Martin	4	2

Quarterfinals
(Uruguay) P Cuevas (Argentina) H Zeballos	6	6
(Luxembourg) G Müller (United States) S Querrey	4	4
7	(United States) B Bryan (United States) M Bryan	7	6
(New Zealand) M Daniell (Argentina) D Schwartzman	5	1

Semifinals
(Uruguay) P Cuevas (Argentina) H Zeballos	6^{5}	4
7	(United States) B Bryan (United States) M Bryan	7^{7}	6
