= Frederico Marques =

Portuguese tennis coach (born 1986)

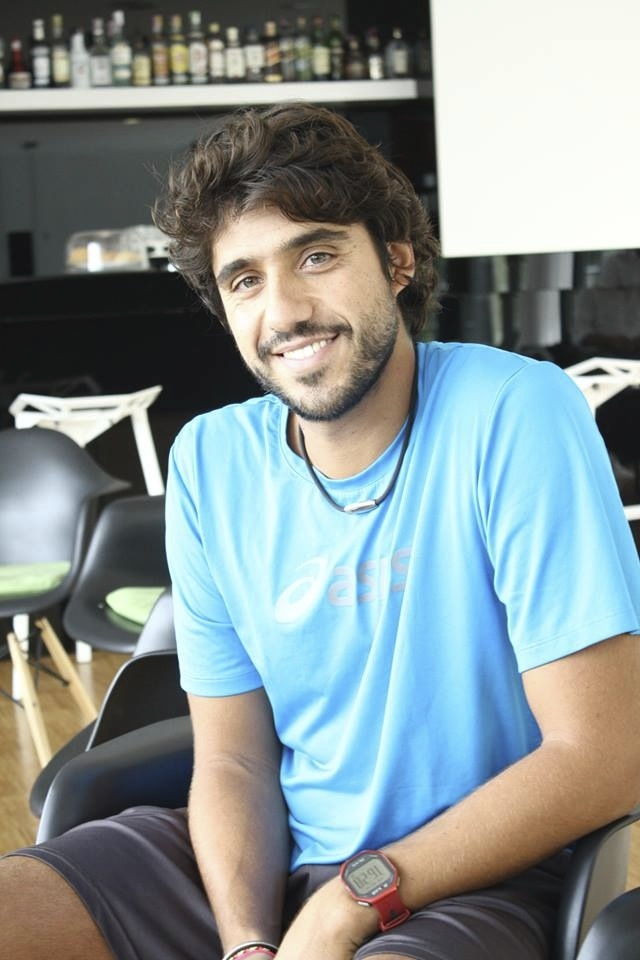
- Country (sports): Portugal
- Residence: Barcelona, Spain
- Born: 4 September 1986 (age 39) Lisbon, Portugal
- Turned pro: 2002
- Retired: 2009
- Plays: Right-handed (two-handed backhand)
- Prize money: $11,939

Singles
- Career record: 0–0
- Career titles: 0
- Highest ranking: No. 964 (13 February 2006)

Doubles
- Career record: 0–0
- Career titles: 0
- Highest ranking: No. 773 (22 August 2005)

Coaching career (2009–)
- Alexander Lobkov (2009–2010); Ma Yanan (2011); China Davis Cup team (2011); Vladislav Dubinsky (2011); João Sousa (2011–2024)

Coaching achievements
- Coachee singles titles total: 2
- Coachee doubles titles total: 0
- List of notable tournaments (with champion): João Sousa career statistics (from 2011)

Coaching awards and records
- Awards Record 2013 Portuguese Coach of the Year
- Last updated on: 9 November 2015.

Frederico Marques (born 4 September 1986) is a Portuguese professional tennis coach on the ATP World Tour.

After a short playing career, he became head coach at the BTT Tennis Academy in Barcelona, where he worked with João Sousa. Since January 2015, Marques is the Global Professional Tennis Coach Association president in Portugal. He is the youngest coach to have an athlete in the ATP top 100 ranking and the first Portuguese member of the ATP Coaches. In 2014, Marques was nominated for the 2014 Portuguese Coach of the Year award.

== Early life ==
Marques was born in Lisbon, Portugal. His father, João, is a managing director of an international company and his mother, Maria, is a housewife. He has an older brother, João, who is bank manager. Marques started playing influenced by his father and his brother at age five. However, he began more serious practice only when he was 12.

Marques pursued a degree in communication studies at Universidade Nova de Lisboa, but never finished, and he also attended at the Autonomous University of Barcelona, Spain. In 2012, he did a Development and Performance Tennis Master in Madrid. Marques speaks Portuguese, Spanish, French and English. Marques is a football fan and his favorite club is S.L. Benfica. He also enjoys triathlons, watching films and spending time with friends. Had he not developed a career in tennis, he would have wanted to be a triathlete or a businessman.

== Tennis career ==
=== Player ===
At youth level, Marques was Under-14, Under-16 and Under-18 Portuguese No. 1. From 2000 to 2003, Marques practiced in the National Tennis Center in Oeiras, Portugal, where he was coached by João Cunha e Silva and Bernardo Mota. He won the Under-16 National Championship mixed doubles tournament in 2001 and the singles and boys' doubles tournaments in 2002. In 2004, Marques moved to the Barcelona Total Tennis (BTT) Tennis Academy in Barcelona to improve his game. During his first year there, Marques shared a rented house with his future coachee João Sousa to reduce expenses.

Marques made his main draw debut in 2001 in a junior tournament at the Taca Group Bowl in El Salvador, with Frederico Gil as his doubles partner. He played his final tournament at this level in August 2004, at the Vila do Conde Junior Tennis Cup. Marques won one singles and four doubles junior titles (including one with Gil and two with Eduardo Schwank) and reached the junior combined ranking world No. 80 in February 2004. Marques entered the professional circuit in 2002 at a Futures tournament in Lisbon. Though he lost all his three Futures doubles finals, he won a Satellite doubles tournament in Coimbra in 2004. Marques never entered the main draw of an ATP tour tournament, but he played the qualifying rounds of the Estoril Open in 2002, 2004 and 2005.

Marques decided to retire as a professional player in 2009 when he realized he would not improve much further as a player and was becoming a financial burden for his parents. However, his final professional match would come later that year, at a Futures doubles tournament in Russia, where he partnered with his coachee Alexander Lobkov. He reached career-high doubles world No. 773 in 2005 and singles world no. 964 in 2006.

=== Coach ===
Immediately after retiring, Marques embarked on a coaching career at the BTT Tennis Academy despite not having previous experience as a coach. His first professional experience was alongside Russian Alexander Lobkov in 2009. After Lobkov won two out of three consecutive tournaments, Marques became his full-time coach from July 2009 to September 2010, a period in which Lobkov rose from world No 1001 to 359. The following season, Marques worked with Chinese Ma Yanan and supported the China Davis Cup team. Then Marques coached another Russian player, Vladislav Dubinsky, from May to October 2011. The relationship broke down due to Dubinsky's poker addiction. When João Sousa began working with Marques in October 2011, he was world No. 220 and Marques had to convince the ATP to amend his contract so that a deal could be reached. Other players Marques coached for a short period include Teymuraz Gabashvili, Arnau Brugués-Davi, Íñigo Cervantes, Steven Diez, James McGee, Denis Matsukevich, Valery Rudnev and Wu Di.

In 2013, Marques was awarded the Record Portuguese Coach of the Year, and in November 2014, he was nominated for the 2014 Portuguese Coach of the Year award, losing to the Portugal national table tennis team coach Pedro Rufino.

== Other ventures ==
When Marques ended his player career, he sought other options to remain physically active. Teased by Sousa, in 2013 he decided to prepare for Ironman Triathlon competitions when was weighing 92 kg (203 lb). In July 2014, he participated in his first Ironman in Zürich. In August 2015, Marques successfully finished an Ultraman race in Canada, where he was the youngest participant at 29.

Since 2014, Marques is sponsored by KTM, which helps him cover the logistics associated with touring alongside Sousa.

== Awards ==
- Record 2013 Portuguese Coach of the Year
