= 2018 BNP Paribas Open – Women's singles =

Women's singles
- 2018 BNP Paribas Open

Final
- Champion: (Japan) Naomi Osaka
- Runner-up: (Russia) Daria Kasatkina
- Score: 6–3, 6–2

Details
- Draw: 96
- Seeds: 32

Events
Singles	men	women
Doubles	men	women
- Indian Wells Open

Naomi Osaka defeated Daria Kasatkina in the final, 6–3, 6–2 to win the women's singles tennis title at the 2018 Indian Wells Masters. It was her first WTA Tour title. This was the first time two players under 21 had contested the final since Kim Clijsters and Serena Williams in 2001. At 20 years old, Osaka was the youngest Indian Wells champion since Ana Ivanovic in 2008, and the youngest at any Premier Mandatory event since Caroline Wozniacki at the 2010 China Open. She was also only the third unseeded player to win the tournament after Serena Williams (1999) and Clijsters (2005), and the first Japanese player to win a Premier Mandatory title.

Elena Vesnina was the defending champion, but lost in the third round to Angelique Kerber.

Simona Halep and Wozniacki were in contention for the WTA No. 1 singles ranking at the beginning of the tournament. Halep retained the top ranking after Wozniacki lost in the fourth round.

Former world No. 1 players Victoria Azarenka, Maria Sharapova and Serena Williams played in the same tournament for the first time since the 2016 Australian Open. This was Azarenka's first tournament since the 2017 Wimbledon Championships and Williams' first since the 2017 Australian Open. It was also Sharapova's first appearance at Indian Wells since 2015.

== Seeds ==
All seeds received a bye into the second round.

1. (Romania) Simona Halep (semifinals)
2. (Denmark) Caroline Wozniacki (fourth round)
3. (Spain) Garbiñe Muguruza (second round)
4. (Ukraine) Elina Svitolina (third round)
5. (Czech Republic) Karolína Plíšková (quarterfinals)
6. (Latvia) Jeļena Ostapenko (third round)
7. (France) Caroline Garcia (fourth round)
8. (United States) Venus Williams (semifinals)
9. (Czech Republic) Petra Kvitová (third round)
10. (Germany) Angelique Kerber (quarterfinals)
11. (United Kingdom) Johanna Konta (second round)
12. (Germany) Julia Görges (third round)
13. (United States) Sloane Stephens (third round)
14. (France) Kristina Mladenovic (third round)
15. (United States) Madison Keys (second round)
16. (Australia) Ashleigh Barty (second round)

17. (United States) CoCo Vandeweghe (third round)
18. (Slovakia) Magdaléna Rybáriková (second round)
19. (Russia) Svetlana Kuznetsova (second round)
20. (Russia) Daria Kasatkina (final)
21. (Latvia) Anastasija Sevastova (fourth round)
22. (Belgium) Elise Mertens (second round)
23. (Russia) Anastasia Pavlyuchenkova (second round)
24. (Russia) Elena Vesnina (third round)
25. (Czech Republic) Barbora Strýcová (second round)
26. (Australia) Daria Gavrilova (third round)
27. (Spain) Carla Suárez Navarro (quarterfinals)
28. (Estonia) Anett Kontaveit (second round)
29. (Netherlands) Kiki Bertens (second round)
30. (Slovakia) Dominika Cibulková (second round)
31. (Poland) Agnieszka Radwańska (second round)
32. (China) Zhang Shuai (third round)

Click on the seed number of a player to go to their draw section.

== Draw ==
Key

- Q = Qualifier
- WC = Wild card
- LL = Lucky loser
- Alt = Alternate
- ITF = ITF entry
- PR = Protected ranking
- SR = Special ranking
- SE = Special exempt
- JE = Junior exempt
- JR = Junior Accelerator Programme entrant
- CO = College Accelerator Programme entrant
- NG = Next Gen Accelerator Program entrant
- w/o = Walkover
- r = Retired
- d = Defaulted

=== Finals ===
Quarterfinals
1	(Romania) Simona Halep	6	6^{5}	6
(Croatia) Petra Martić	4	7^{7}	3
(Japan) Naomi Osaka	6	6
5	(Czech Republic) Karolína Plíšková	2	3
8	(United States) Venus Williams	6	6
27	(Spain) Carla Suárez Navarro	3	2
10	(Germany) Angelique Kerber	0	2
20	(Russia) Daria Kasatkina	6	6

Semifinals
1	(Romania) Simona Halep	3	0
(Japan) Naomi Osaka	6	6
8	(United States) Venus Williams	6	4	5
20	(Russia) Daria Kasatkina	4	6	7

Final
(Japan) Naomi Osaka	6	6
20	(Russia) Daria Kasatkina	3	2

=== Top half ===
==== Section 1 ====
First round
Q	(China) Y Duan	4	6^{5}
(Czech Republic) Kr Plíšková	6	7^{7}
(United States) S Rogers	6	6^{6}	3
WC	(United States) C Dolehide	3	7^{8}	6
(China) Q Wang	6	4	6
(Switzerland) T Bacsinszky	0	6	2
(Australia) S Stosur	3	6	6
(United States) L Davis	6	3	3

Second round
1	(Romania) S Halep	6	6
(Czech Republic) Kr Plíšková	4	4
WC	(United States) C Dolehide	5	6	6
30	(Slovakia) D Cibulková	7	3	4
22	(Belgium) E Mertens	6	3	3
(China) Q Wang	4	6	6
(Australia) S Stosur	5	5
14	(France) K Mladenovic	7	7

Third round
1	(Romania) S Halep	1	7^{7}	6
WC	(United States) C Dolehide	6	6^{3}	2
(China) Q Wang	6	6
14	(France) K Mladenovic	1	2

Fourth round
1	(Romania) S Halep	7	6
(China) Q Wang	5	1

==== Section 2 ====
First round
(Czech Republic) M Vondroušová	6	6
Q	(United States) M Brengle	2	2
(Belarus) A Sabalenka	7	6
(United States) V Lepchenko	5	1
(Croatia) P Martić	6	6
(Germany) T Maria	3	1
(Switzerland) B Bencic	1	6	7^{7}
(Hungary) T Babos	6	1	6^{4}

Second round
11	(United Kingdom) J Konta	6^{5}	4
(Czech Republic) M Vondroušová	7^{7}	6
(Belarus) A Sabalenka	6	6
19	(Russia) S Kuznetsova	4	3
25	(Czech Republic) B Strýcová	5	4
(Croatia) P Martić	7	6
(Switzerland) B Bencic	4	6	1
6	(Latvia) J Ostapenko	6	3	6

Third round
(Czech Republic) M Vondroušová	6	6
(Belarus) A Sabalenka	2	2
(Croatia) P Martić	6	6
6	(Latvia) J Ostapenko	3	3

Fourth round
(Czech Republic) M Vondroušová	3	6^{4}
(Croatia) P Martić	6	7^{7}

==== Section 3 ====
First round
WC	(Canada) E Bouchard	3	4
Q	(United States) S Vickery	6	6
(Japan) N Osaka	6	6
(Russia) M Sharapova	4	4
Q	(Japan) K Nara	6	4	4
(Estonia) K Kanepi	1	6	6
(Croatia) D Vekić	4	2
(Greece) M Sakkari	6	6

Second round
3	(Spain) G Muguruza	6	5	1
Q	(United States) S Vickery	2	7	6
(Japan) N Osaka	6	6
31	(Poland) A Radwańska	3	2
17	(United States) C Vandeweghe	6	7^{8}
(Estonia) K Kanepi	0	6^{6}
(Greece) M Sakkari	6	6
16	(Australia) A Barty	4	2

Third round
Q	(United States) S Vickery	3	3
(Japan) N Osaka	6	6
17	(United States) C Vandeweghe	2	4
(Greece) M Sakkari	6	6

Fourth round
(Japan) N Osaka	6	5	6
(Greece) M Sakkari	1	7	1

==== Section 4 ====
First round
(Kazakhstan) Y Putintseva	6	2	6
(Belgium) A Van Uytvanck	0	6	2
WC	(United States) A Anisimova	6	6
(France) P Parmentier	2	2
Q	(United States) S Kenin	6	6
WC	(United States) C Liu	2	0
(Serbia) A Krunić	6	4	1
(Romania) I-C Begu	3	6	6

Second round
9	(Czech Republic) P Kvitová	6^{4}	7^{7}	6
(Kazakhstan) Y Putintseva	7^{7}	6^{3}	4
WC	(United States) A Anisimova	6	6
23	(Russia) A Pavlyuchenkova	4	1
32	(China) S Zhang	6	6
Q	(United States) S Kenin	2	3
(Romania) I-C Begu	6^{4}	1
5	(Czech Republic) Ka Plíšková	7^{7}	6

Third round
9	(Czech Republic) P Kvitová	2	4
WC	(United States) A Anisimova	6	6
32	(China) S Zhang	5	7	3
5	(Czech Republic) Ka Plíšková	7	5	6

Fourth round
WC	(United States) A Anisimova	1	6^{2}
5	(Czech Republic) Ka Plíšková	6	7^{7}

=== Bottom half ===
==== Section 5 ====
First round
Q	(Romania) M Niculescu	2	3
(Romania) S Cîrstea	6	6
(United States) S Williams	7	6
(Kazakhstan) Z Diyas	5	3
(Puerto Rico) M Puig	6	7^{7}
(Brazil) B Haddad Maia	3	6^{3}
Q	(Russia) V Zvonareva	3	2
(Russia) N Vikhlyantseva	6	6

Second round
8	(United States) V Williams	6	6
(Romania) S Cîrstea	3	4
(United States) S Williams	7^{7}	7
29	(Netherlands) K Bertens	6^{5}	5
21	(Latvia) A Sevastova	6	2	6
(Puerto Rico) M Puig	2	6	1
(Russia) N Vikhlyantseva	4	1
12	(Germany) J Görges	6	6

Third round
8	(United States) V Williams	6	6
(United States) S Williams	3	4
21	(Latvia) A Sevastova	6	6
12	(Germany) J Görges	3	3

Fourth round
8	(United States) V Williams	7^{8}	6
21	(Latvia) A Sevastova	6^{6}	4

==== Section 6 ====
First round
WC	(United States) D Collins	2	6	6
Q	(United States) T Townsend	6	4	3
WC	(Russia) S Zhuk	7	6
(France) A Cornet	5	4
(Germany) C Witthöft	4^{r}
Q	(Chinese Taipei) S-w Hsieh	5
(Paraguay) V Cepede Royg	2	1
(Germany) M Barthel	6	6

Second round
15	(United States) M Keys	3	6^{1}
WC	(United States) D Collins	6	7^{7}
WC	(Russia) S Zhuk	6	2	7
18	(Slovakia) M Rybáriková	3	6	5
27	(Spain) C Suárez Navarro	6	2	6
Q	(Chinese Taipei) S-w Hsieh	4	6	3
(Germany) M Barthel	4	3
4	(Ukraine) E Svitolina	6	6

Third round
WC	(United States) D Collins	6	6
WC	(Russia) S Zhuk	4	4
27	(Spain) C Suárez Navarro	7	6
4	(Ukraine) E Svitolina	5	3

Fourth round
WC	(United States) D Collins	2	4
27	(Spain) C Suárez Navarro	6	6

==== Section 7 ====
First round
(United States) J Brady	3	6	6
(Romania) M Buzărnescu	6	4	2
Q	(Belgium) Y Wickmayer	6	6
WC	(United States) K Day	3	2
Q	(Spain) S Sorribes Tormo	0	3
(United States) C Bellis	6	6
(Russia) E Makarova	6	6
(Belgium) K Flipkens	2	4

Second round
7	(France) C Garcia	6	6
(United States) J Brady	4	4
Q	(Belgium) Y Wickmayer	6^{3}	2
26	(Australia) D Gavrilova	7^{7}	6
24	(Russia) E Vesnina	2	6	6
(United States) C Bellis	6	1	1
(Russia) E Makarova	6	4	2
10	(Germany) A Kerber	3	6	6

Third round
7	(France) C Garcia	7	6
26	(Australia) D Gavrilova	5	4
24	(Russia) E Vesnina	5	2
10	(Germany) A Kerber	7	6

Fourth round
7	(France) C Garcia	1	1
10	(Germany) A Kerber	6	6

==== Section 8 ====
First round
WC	(Belarus) V Azarenka	6	6
(United Kingdom) H Watson	4	2
(United States) C McHale	6	2	6^{6}
(Czech Republic) K Siniaková	3	6	7^{8}
(Belarus) A Sasnovich	5	7^{7}	7^{7}
(Poland) M Linette	7	6^{2}	6^{4}
Q	(Spain) L Arruabarrena	3	6	6
(Ukraine) L Tsurenko	6	3	4

Second round
13	(United States) S Stephens	6	7
WC	(Belarus) V Azarenka	1	5
(Czech Republic) K Siniaková	2	2^{r}
20	(Russia) D Kasatkina	6	5
28	(Estonia) A Kontaveit	2	4
(Belarus) A Sasnovich	6	6
Q	(Spain) L Arruabarrena	4	1
2	(Denmark) C Wozniacki	6	6

Third round
13	(United States) S Stephens	4	3
20	(Russia) D Kasatkina	6	6
(Belarus) A Sasnovich	4	6	3
2	(Denmark) C Wozniacki	6	2	6

Fourth round
20	(Russia) D Kasatkina	6	7
2	(Denmark) C Wozniacki	4	5

== Qualifying ==
=== Seeds ===
1. (Ukraine) Kateryna Kozlova (first round)
2. (Chinese Taipei) Hsieh Su-wei (qualified)
3. (Romania) Monica Niculescu (qualified)
4. (Sweden) Johanna Larsson (qualifying competition)
5. (United States) Madison Brengle (qualified)
6. (Spain) Lara Arruabarrena (qualified)
7. (Ukraine) Kateryna Bondarenko (first round)
8. (Italy) Francesca Schiavone (first round)
9. (France) Pauline Parmentier (moved to main draw)
10. (China) Duan Yingying (qualified)
11. (United States) Taylor Townsend (qualified)
12. (Australia) Ajla Tomljanović (qualifying competition)
13. (Slovakia) Jana Čepelová (qualifying competition)
14. (Japan) Kurumi Nara (qualified)
15. (United States) Sachia Vickery (qualified)
16. (United States) Bernarda Pera (qualifying competition)
17. (United States) Sofia Kenin (qualified)
18. (Germany) Andrea Petkovic (qualifying competition)
19. (Spain) Sara Sorribes Tormo (qualified)
20. (Netherlands) Richèl Hogenkamp (qualifying competition)
21. (United States) Alison Riske (first round)
22. (United States) Kristie Ahn (qualifying competition)
23. (Russia) Evgeniya Rodina (first round)
24. (Switzerland) Viktorija Golubic (first round)

=== Qualifiers ===
1. (United States) Sachia Vickery
2. (Chinese Taipei) Hsieh Su-wei
3. (Romania) Monica Niculescu
4. (Japan) Kurumi Nara
5. (United States) Madison Brengle
6. (Spain) Lara Arruabarrena
7. (United States) Sofia Kenin
8. (Belgium) Yanina Wickmayer
9. (Russia) Vera Zvonareva
10. (China) Duan Yingying
11. (United States) Taylor Townsend
12. (Spain) Sara Sorribes Tormo

=== Qualifying draw ===
==== First qualifier ====
First round
1	(Ukraine) Kateryna Kozlova	4	1
WC	(United States) Ashley Kratzer	6	6
(Sweden) Rebecca Peterson	3	0^{r}
15	(United States) Sachia Vickery	6	4

Qualifying competition
WC	(United States) Ashley Kratzer	5	1
15	(United States) Sachia Vickery	7	6

==== Second qualifier ====
First round
2	(Chinese Taipei) Hsieh Su-wei	6	6
(Japan) Risa Ozaki	4	3
(Czech Republic) Barbora Krejčíková	7	6
21	(United States) Alison Riske	5	4

Qualifying competition
2	(Chinese Taipei) Hsieh Su-wei	7	6
(Czech Republic) Barbora Krejčíková	5	1

==== Third qualifier ====
First round
3	(Romania) Monica Niculescu	6	6
WC	(United States) Ann Li	3	0
WC	(Italy) Roberta Vinci	7	6
23	(Russia) Evgeniya Rodina	5	3

Qualifying competition
3	(Romania) Monica Niculescu	6	6
WC	(Italy) Roberta Vinci	0	4

==== Fourth qualifier ====
First round
4	(Sweden) Johanna Larsson	6	6
(Australia) Arina Rodionova	3	3
(China) Wang Yafan	4	2
14	(Japan) Kurumi Nara	6	6

Qualifying competition
4	(Sweden) Johanna Larsson	4	6^{3}
14	(Japan) Kurumi Nara	6	7^{7}

==== Fifth qualifier ====
First round
5	(United States) Madison Brengle	6	6
(Netherlands) Arantxa Rus	3	3
(Canada) Françoise Abanda	3	3
20	(Netherlands) Richèl Hogenkamp	6	6

Qualifying competition
5	(United States) Madison Brengle	6	6
20	(Netherlands) Richèl Hogenkamp	3	1

==== Sixth qualifier ====
First round
6	(Spain) Lara Arruabarrena	6	2	6
(Tunisia) Ons Jabeur	2	6	4
(Canada) Carol Zhao	6	6^{2}	2
22	(United States) Kristie Ahn	4	7^{7}	6

Qualifying competition
6	(Spain) Lara Arruabarrena	7	6
22	(United States) Kristie Ahn	5	3

==== Seventh qualifier ====
First round
7	(Ukraine) Kateryna Bondarenko	0	3
(Belarus) Vera Lapko	6	6
WC	(Germany) Sabine Lisicki	5	2
17	(United States) Sofia Kenin	7	6

Qualifying competition
(Belarus) Vera Lapko	4	6	1
17	(United States) Sofia Kenin	6	3	6

==== Eighth qualifier ====
First round
8	(Italy) Francesca Schiavone	7	5	1
(Switzerland) Jil Teichmann	5	7	6
(Belgium) Yanina Wickmayer	6	7
24	(Switzerland) Viktorija Golubic	3	5

Qualifying competition
(Switzerland) Jil Teichmann	4	1
(Belgium) Yanina Wickmayer	6	6

==== Ninth qualifier ====
First round
Alt	(Russia) Vera Zvonareva	6	6
WC	(United States) Victoria Duval	2	1
(Croatia) Jana Fett	3	4
16	(United States) Bernarda Pera	6	6

Qualifying competition
Alt	(Russia) Vera Zvonareva	5	6	6
16	(United States) Bernarda Pera	7	3	4

==== Tenth qualifier ====
First round
10	(China) Duan Yingying	6	6
PR	(Slovakia) Kristína Kučová	4	3
WC	(United States) Louisa Chirico	0	3
13	(Slovakia) Jana Čepelová	6	6

Qualifying competition
10	(China) Duan Yingying	6	6
13	(Slovakia) Jana Čepelová	1	3

==== Eleventh qualifier ====
First round
11	(United States) Taylor Townsend	6	7^{7}
(United Kingdom) Naomi Broady	2	6^{4}
(United States) Nicole Gibbs	6	2	0
18	(Germany) Andrea Petkovic	1	6	6

Qualifying competition
11	(United States) Taylor Townsend	6	6
18	(Germany) Andrea Petkovic	3	2

==== Twelfth qualifier ====
First round
12	(Australia) Ajla Tomljanović	6	6
(Colombia) Mariana Duque Mariño	3	0
WC	(United States) Allie Kiick	2	6	4
19	(Spain) Sara Sorribes Tormo	6	4	6

Qualifying competition
12	(Australia) Ajla Tomljanović	4	2
19	(Spain) Sara Sorribes Tormo	6	6
