= 2018 BNP Paribas Open – Men's singles =

Men's singles
- 2018 BNP Paribas Open

Final
- Champion: (Argentina) Juan Martín del Potro
- Runner-up: (Switzerland) Roger Federer
- Score: 6–4, 6–7^{(8–10)}, 7–6^{(7–2)}

Details
- Draw: 96 (12 Q / 5 WC )
- Seeds: 32

Events
Singles	men	women
Doubles	men	women
- Indian Wells Masters

Juan Martín del Potro defeated the defending champion Roger Federer in the final, 6–4, 6–7^{(8–10)}, 7–6^{(7–2)} to win the men's singles tennis title at the 2018 Indian Wells Masters. He saved three championship points en route to his first Masters 1000 title, following three previous runner-up finishes.

Federer and Rafael Nadal (despite having withdrawn from the event) were in contention for the ATP No. 1 singles ranking. Federer retained the top ranking by reaching the semifinals.

== Seeds ==
All seeds receive a bye into the second round.

1. (Switzerland) Roger Federer (final)
2. (Croatia) Marin Čilić (third round)
3. (Bulgaria) Grigor Dimitrov (second round)
4. (Germany) Alexander Zverev (second round)
5. (Austria) Dominic Thiem (third round, retired)
6. (Argentina) Juan Martín del Potro (champion)
7. (South Africa) Kevin Anderson (quarterfinals)
8. (United States) Jack Sock (third round)
9. (France) Lucas Pouille (second round)
10. (Serbia) Novak Djokovic (second round)
11. (Spain) Pablo Carreño Busta (fourth round)
12. (Czech Republic) Tomáš Berdych (third round)
13. (Spain) Roberto Bautista Agut (third round)
14. (Argentina) Diego Schwartzman (second round)
15. (United States) John Isner (second round)
16. (Italy) Fabio Fognini (second round)

17. (Australia) ~~Nick Kyrgios~~ (withdrew)
18. (United States) Sam Querrey (quarterfinals)
19. (Spain) Albert Ramos Viñolas (second round)
20. (France) Adrian Mannarino (third round)
21. (United Kingdom) Kyle Edmund (second round)
22. (Japan) ~~Kei Nishikori~~ (withdrew)
23. (South Korea) Chung Hyeon (quarterfinals)
24. (Luxembourg) Gilles Müller (second round)
25. (Serbia) Filip Krajinović (third round)
26. (Bosnia and Herzegovina) Damir Džumhur (second round)
27. (Russia) Andrey Rublev (second round)
28. (Spain) Feliciano López (fourth round)
29. (Spain) David Ferrer (third round)
30. (Uruguay) Pablo Cuevas (fourth round)
31. (Germany) Philipp Kohlschreiber (quarterfinals)
32. (Canada) Milos Raonic (semifinals)

Click on the seed number of a player to go to their draw section.

== Draw ==
Key

- Q = Qualifier
- WC = Wild card
- LL = Lucky loser
- Alt = Alternate
- ITF = ITF entry
- PR = Protected ranking
- SR = Special ranking
- SE = Special exempt
- JE = Junior exempt
- JR = Junior Accelerator Programme entrant
- CO = College Accelerator Programme entrant
- NG = Next Gen Accelerator Program entrant
- w/o = Walkover
- r = Retired
- d = Defaulted

=== Finals ===
Quarterfinals
1	(Switzerland) Roger Federer	7	6
23	(South Korea) Chung Hyeon	5	1
(Croatia) Borna Ćorić	2	6	7^{7}
7	(South Africa) Kevin Anderson	6	4	6^{3}
18	(United States) Sam Querrey	5	6	3
32	(Canada) Milos Raonic	7	2	6
6	(Argentina) Juan Martín del Potro	3	6	6
31	(Germany) Philipp Kohlschreiber	6	3	4

Semifinals
1	(Switzerland) Roger Federer	5	6	6
(Croatia) Borna Ćorić	7	4	4
32	(Canada) Milos Raonic	2	3
6	(Argentina) Juan Martín del Potro	6	6

Final
1	(Switzerland) Roger Federer	4	7^{10}	6^{2}
6	(Argentina) Juan Martín del Potro	6	6^{8}	7^{7}

=== Top half ===
==== Section 1 ====
First round
(United States) R Harrison	2	6	5
(Argentina) F Delbonis	6	4	7
(France) B Paire	4	6	4
Q	(United States) M Krueger	6	1	6
(Romania) M Copil	6^{3}	7^{7}	6^{12}
Q	(Canada) P Polansky	7^{7}	6^{5}	7^{14}
(France) J Benneteau	4	6^{9}
(France) J Chardy	6	7^{11}

Second round
1	(Switzerland) R Federer	6	7^{8}
(Argentina) F Delbonis	3	6^{6}
Q	(United States) M Krueger	2	2
25	(Serbia) F Krajinović	6	6
20	(France) A Mannarino	6	6
Q	(Canada) P Polansky	1	4
(France) J Chardy	4	7^{7}	6
16	(Italy) F Fognini	6	6^{2}	4

Third round
1	(Switzerland) R Federer	6	6
25	(Serbia) F Krajinović	2	1
20	(France) A Mannarino	5	6	1
(France) J Chardy	7	4	6

Fourth round
1	(Switzerland) R Federer	7	6
(France) J Chardy	5	4

==== Section 2 ====
First round
(Croatia) I Karlović	7^{15}	6^{4}	3
(Germany) M Marterer	6^{13}	7^{7}	6
(Slovakia) L Lacko	4	4
(Serbia) D Lajović	6	6
(Canada) D Shapovalov	6	6
Q	(Lithuania) R Berankis	3	4
(Moldova) R Albot	6^{2}	2
(Greece) S Tsitsipas	7^{7}	6

Second round
12	(Czech Republic) T Berdych	6	6
(Germany) M Marterer	1	4
(Serbia) D Lajović	7^{11}	3	3
23	(South Korea) H Chung	6^{9}	6	6
30	(Uruguay) P Cuevas	7^{7}	6
(Canada) D Shapovalov	6^{4}	3
(Greece) S Tsitsipas	2	6	3
5	(Austria) D Thiem	6	3	6

Third round
12	(Czech Republic) T Berdych	4	4
23	(South Korea) H Chung	6	6
30	(Uruguay) P Cuevas	3	6	4
5	(Austria) D Thiem	6	4	2^{r}

Fourth round
23	(South Korea) H Chung	6	6
30	(Uruguay) P Cuevas	1	3

==== Section 3 ====
First round
(Spain) F Verdasco	6	1	6
(Argentina) G Pella	2	6	2
(United States) T Fritz	4	7^{8}	6
WC	(United States) R Opelka	6	6^{6}	4
(Croatia) B Ćorić	6	6
(United States) D Young	0	2
(United States) J Donaldson	6	4	6
Q	(United States) E King	1	6	4

Second round
3	(Bulgaria) G Dimitrov	6^{4}	6	3
(Spain) F Verdasco	7^{7}	4	6
(United States) T Fritz	6	7^{7}
27	(Russia) A Rublev	4	6^{4}
19	(Spain) A Ramos Viñolas	0	3
(Croatia) B Ćorić	6	6
(United States) J Donaldson	4	2
13	(Spain) R Bautista Agut	6	6

Third round
(Spain) F Verdasco	6	2	6^{1}
(United States) T Fritz	4	6	7^{7}
(Croatia) B Ćorić	6	6
13	(Spain) R Bautista Agut	1	3

Fourth round
(United States) T Fritz	2	7^{8}	4
(Croatia) B Ćorić	6	6^{6}	6

==== Section 4 ====
First round
(Argentina) H Zeballos	6^{5}	6	7^{7}
(Japan) Y Sugita	7^{7}	4	6^{4}
(United States) S Johnson	6^{0}	4
(Russia) D Medvedev	7^{7}	6
(Argentina) N Kicker	7	6
(Czech Republic) J Veselý	5	3
(Russia) K Khachanov	3	6	6^{4}
(Russia) E Donskoy	6	1	7^{7}

Second round
11	(Spain) P Carreño Busta	3	6	7^{7}
(Argentina) H Zeballos	6	3	6^{3}
(Russia) D Medvedev	6^{6}	7	6
LL	(Italy) M Berrettini	7^{8}	5	4
26	(Bosnia and Herzegovina) D Džumhur	6	2	1
(Argentina) N Kicker	4	6	6
(Russia) E Donskoy	5	4
7	(South Africa) K Anderson	7	6

Third round
11	(Spain) P Carreño Busta	6	7
(Russia) D Medvedev	1	5
(Argentina) N Kicker	6^{1}	6^{3}
7	(South Africa) K Anderson	7^{7}	7^{7}

Fourth round
11	(Spain) P Carreño Busta	6	3	6^{6}
7	(South Africa) K Anderson	4	6	7^{8}

=== Bottom half ===
==== Section 5 ====
First round
(Italy) T Fabbiano	6	6
WC	(United States) B Klahn	4	4
(United States) F Tiafoe	5	3
WC	(United States) E Escobedo	7	6
(Kazakhstan) M Kukushkin	3	6	1
(Germany) M Zverev	6	4	6
Q	(India) Y Bhambri	7	6
Q	(France) N Mahut	5	3

Second round
8	(United States) J Sock	6	7
(Italy) T Fabbiano	2	5
WC	(United States) E Escobedo	4	3
28	(Spain) F López	6	6
18	(United States) S Querrey	6	7
(Germany) M Zverev	4	5
Q	(India) Y Bhambri	6	6
9	(France) L Pouille	4	4

Third round
8	(United States) J Sock	6^{6}	6	4
28	(Spain) F López	7^{8}	4	6
18	(United States) S Querrey	6^{4}	6	6
Q	(India) Y Bhambri	7^{7}	4	4

Fourth round
28	(Spain) F López	3	4
18	(United States) S Querrey	6	6

==== Section 6 ====
First round
Q	(Cyprus) M Baghdatis	7	3	7
PR	(Japan) Y Nishioka	5	6	5
LL	(Israel) D Sela	6	6
(Germany) P Gojowczyk	4	4
Q	(Canada) V Pospisil	2	6^{4}
Q	(Canada) F Auger-Aliassime	6	7^{7}
(Russia) M Youzhny	6	4	6^{4}
(Portugal) J Sousa	4	6	7^{7}

Second round
14	(Argentina) D Schwartzman	5	4
Q	(Cyprus) M Baghdatis	7	6
LL	(Israel) D Sela	6	6
21	(United Kingdom) K Edmund	4	4
32	(Canada) M Raonic	6	6
Q	(Canada) F Auger-Aliassime	4	4
(Portugal) J Sousa	7	5	6
4	(Germany) A Zverev	5	7	4

Third round
Q	(Cyprus) M Baghdatis	7^{7}	6
LL	(Israel) D Sela	6^{5}	4
32	(Canada) M Raonic	7	4	6
(Portugal) J Sousa	5	6	2

Fourth round
Q	(Cyprus) M Baghdatis
32	(Canada) M Raonic	w/o

==== Section 7 ====
First round
(Germany) J-L Struff	6	6^{3}	6^{5}
WC	(Australia) A de Minaur	3	7^{7}	7^{7}
(Georgia (country)) N Basilashvili	3	1^{r}
WC	(United States) T Sandgren	6	2
(Argentina) L Mayer	4	6	6
(Dominican Republic) V Estrella Burgos	6	4	1
Q	(Japan) T Daniel	6	1	6
Q	(United Kingdom) C Norrie	3	6	1

Second round
6	(Argentina) JM del Potro	6	6
WC	(Australia) A de Minaur	2	1
WC	(United States) T Sandgren	2	6^{3}
29	(Spain) D Ferrer	6	7^{7}
LL	(Belgium) R Bemelmans	4	1
(Argentina) L Mayer	6	6
Q	(Japan) T Daniel	7^{7}	4	6
10	(Serbia) N Djokovic	6^{3}	6	1

Third round
6	(Argentina) JM del Potro	6	7^{7}
29	(Spain) D Ferrer	4	6^{3}
(Argentina) L Mayer	6	6
Q	(Japan) T Daniel	4	1

Fourth round
6	(Argentina) JM del Potro	3	7^{7}	6
(Argentina) L Mayer	6	6^{2}	3

==== Section 8 ====
First round
(France) G Monfils	6	6
(Australia) M Ebden	3	3
(France) P-H Herbert	6^{8}	7^{7}	6
(France) G Simon	7^{10}	6^{5}	3
Q	(United States) T Smyczek	6	6
(Serbia) L Đere	3	2
(Serbia) V Troicki	6^{3}	1
(Hungary) M Fucsovics	7^{7}	6

Second round
15	(United States) J Isner	7^{7}	6^{3}	5
(France) G Monfils	6^{5}	7^{7}	7
(France) P-H Herbert	6	7
24	(Luxembourg) G Müller	3	5
31	(Germany) P Kohlschreiber	1	6	6
Q	(United States) T Smyczek	6	4	4
(Hungary) M Fucsovics	5	3
2	(Croatia) M Čilić	7	6

Third round
(France) G Monfils	2	1^{r}
(France) P-H Herbert	6	3
31	(Germany) P Kohlschreiber	6	6
2	(Croatia) M Čilić	4	4

Fourth round
(France) P-H Herbert	4	6^{1}
31	(Germany) P Kohlschreiber	6	7^{7}

== Qualifying ==
=== Seeds ===
1. (Canada) Vasek Pospisil (qualified)
2. (Bosnia and Herzegovina) Mirza Bašić (first round)
3. (Israel) Dudi Sela (qualifying competition, lucky loser)
4. (France) Nicolas Mahut (qualified)
5. (Cyprus) Marcos Baghdatis (qualified)
6. (Lithuania) Ričardas Berankis (qualified)
7. (Italy) Matteo Berrettini (qualifying competition, lucky loser)
8. (Japan) Taro Daniel (qualified)
9. (India) Yuki Bhambri (qualified)
10. (United Kingdom) Cameron Norrie (qualified)
11. (United States) Bjorn Fratangelo (first round)
12. (Belgium) Ruben Bemelmans (qualifying competition, lucky loser)
13. (Spain) Adrián Menéndez Maceiras (qualifying competition)
14. (Ukraine) Sergiy Stakhovsky (qualifying competition)
15. (Germany) Yannick Hanfmann (first round)
16. (Switzerland) Henri Laaksonen (first round)
17. (United States) Tim Smyczek (qualified)
18. (Slovakia) Martin Kližan (first round)
19. (Canada) Peter Polansky (qualified)
20. (India) Ramkumar Ramanathan (qualifying competition)
21. (United States) Mackenzie McDonald (qualifying competition)
22. (Kazakhstan) Alexander Bublik (qualifying competition, retired)
23. (Slovakia) Norbert Gombos (qualifying competition)
24. (France) Calvin Hemery (first round)

=== Qualifiers ===
1. (Canada) Vasek Pospisil
2. (United States) Mitchell Krueger
3. (United States) Evan King
4. (France) Nicolas Mahut
5. (Cyprus) Marcos Baghdatis
6. (Lithuania) Ričardas Berankis
7. (Canada) Peter Polansky
8. (Japan) Taro Daniel
9. (India) Yuki Bhambri
10. (United Kingdom) Cameron Norrie
11. (Canada) Félix Auger-Aliassime
12. (United States) Tim Smyczek

=== Lucky losers ===
1. (Israel) Dudi Sela
2. (Italy) Matteo Berrettini
3. (Belgium) Ruben Bemelmans

=== Qualifying draw ===
==== First qualifier ====
First round
1	(Canada) Vasek Pospisil	6	7^{7}
WC	(United States) Brandon Nakashima	0	6^{3}
(United States) Stefan Kozlov	2	6^{8}
13	(Spain) Adrián Menéndez Maceiras	6	7^{10}

Qualifying competition
1	(Canada) Vasek Pospisil	7^{7}	6
13	(Spain) Adrián Menéndez Maceiras	6^{5}	2

==== Second qualifier ====
First round
2	(Bosnia and Herzegovina) Mirza Bašić	2	5
(United States) Mitchell Krueger	6	7
(United States) Kevin King	2	4
22	(Kazakhstan) Alexander Bublik	6	6

Qualifying competition
(United States) Mitchell Krueger	4
22	(Kazakhstan) Alexander Bublik	3^{r}

==== Third qualifier ====
First round
3	(Israel) Dudi Sela	6	6
(United States) Noah Rubin	2	1
(United States) Evan King	6	6^{5}	6
18	(Slovakia) Martin Kližan	4	7^{7}	3

Qualifying competition
3	(Israel) Dudi Sela	0	3
(United States) Evan King	6	6

==== Fourth qualifier ====
First round
4	(France) Nicolas Mahut	6	6
(Portugal) Gonçalo Oliveira	3	3
(Spain) Ricardo Ojeda Lara	7^{7}	3	6
24	(France) Calvin Hemery	6^{2}	6	4

Qualifying competition
4	(France) Nicolas Mahut	6	6
(Spain) Ricardo Ojeda Lara	3	2

==== Fifth qualifier ====
First round
5	(Cyprus) Marcos Baghdatis	6	6
(Australia) Thanasi Kokkinakis	1	3
(France) Vincent Millot	6	7
15	(Germany) Yannick Hanfmann	2	5

Qualifying competition
5	(Cyprus) Marcos Baghdatis	6	6
(France) Vincent Millot	1	2

==== Sixth qualifier ====
First round
6	(Lithuania) Ričardas Berankis	6	6
(Barbados) Darian King	3	2
(Norway) Casper Ruud	6	6
16	(Switzerland) Henri Laaksonen	1	4

Qualifying competition
6	(Lithuania) Ričardas Berankis	2	6	6
(Norway) Casper Ruud	6	2	2

==== Seventh qualifier ====
First round
7	(Italy) Matteo Berrettini	6	7
(United States) Denis Kudla	4	5
(El Salvador) Marcelo Arévalo	5	3
19	(Canada) Peter Polansky	7	6

Qualifying competition
7	(Italy) Matteo Berrettini	3	6	3
19	(Canada) Peter Polansky	6	1	6

==== Eighth qualifier ====
First round
8	(Japan) Taro Daniel	6	6
WC	(United States) Evan Song	4	0
(United States) Alexander Sarkissian	1	3
21	(United States) Mackenzie McDonald	6	6

Qualifying competition
8	(Japan) Taro Daniel	6	6
21	(United States) Mackenzie McDonald	4	3

==== Ninth qualifier ====
First round
9	(India) Yuki Bhambri	7	7
(United States) Dennis Novikov	5	5
(United States) Michael Mmoh	3	5
20	(India) Ramkumar Ramanathan	6	7

Qualifying competition
9	(India) Yuki Bhambri	6	6
20	(India) Ramkumar Ramanathan	4	2

==== Tenth qualifier ====
First round
10	(United Kingdom) Cameron Norrie	6	6
(United States) Christian Harrison	2	3
WC	(United States) Marcos Giron	7	6^{4}	4
14	(Ukraine) Sergiy Stakhovsky	5	7^{7}	6

Qualifying competition
10	(United Kingdom) Cameron Norrie	6	6
14	(Ukraine) Sergiy Stakhovsky	4	2

==== Eleventh qualifier ====
First round
11	(United States) Bjorn Fratangelo	4	4
(Canada) Félix Auger-Aliassime	6	6
(United Kingdom) Liam Broady	6^{6}	3
23	(Slovakia) Norbert Gombos	7^{8}	6

Qualifying competition
(Canada) Félix Auger-Aliassime	2	7^{7}	6
23	(Slovakia) Norbert Gombos	6	6^{4}	3

==== Twelfth qualifier ====
First round
12	(Belgium) Ruben Bemelmans	6	7^{7}
WC	(United States) Tristan Boyer	1	6^{3}
WC	(United States) Sebastian Korda	7^{7}	2	5
17	(United States) Tim Smyczek	6^{4}	6	7

Qualifying competition
12	(Belgium) Ruben Bemelmans	3	6^{1}
17	(United States) Tim Smyczek	6	7^{7}
