= 2018 BNP Paribas Open =

- Date: March 5–18
- Edition: 45th (ATP) / 30th (WTA)
- Category: ATP World Tour Masters 1000 (Men); WTA Premier Mandatory (Women)
- Draw: 96S / 32D
- Prize money: $7,972,535 (ATP) $7,972,535 (WTA)
- Surface: Hard / outdoor
- Location: Indian Wells, California, United States
- Venue: Indian Wells Tennis Garden

Champions

Men's singles
- (Argentina) Juan Martín del Potro

Women's singles
- (Japan) Naomi Osaka

Men's doubles
- (United States) John Isner / (United States) Jack Sock

Women's doubles
- (Chinese Taipei) Hsieh Su-wei / (Czech Republic) Barbora Strýcová
← 2017 ·	Indian Wells Open	· 2019 →

The 2018 BNP Paribas Open (also known as the Indian Wells Open) was a professional tennis tournament played at Indian Wells, California in March 2018. It is the 45th edition of the men's event and 30th of the women's event, and is classified as an ATP World Tour Masters 1000 event on the 2018 ATP World Tour and a Premier Mandatory event on the 2018 WTA Tour. Both the men's and the women's events took place at the Indian Wells Tennis Garden in Indian Wells, California, United States from March 5 through March 18, 2018, on outdoor hard courts.

For the first time ever, tournament organisers offered a $1,000,000 reward to any player, male or female, who wins both singles and doubles titles in the same year. However, for the 2018 edition, no players remained in contention for the bonus reward prize.

== Finals ==
=== Men's singles ===
- (Argentina) Juan Martín del Potro defeated (Switzerland) Roger Federer, 6–4, 6–7^{(8–10)}, 7–6^{(7–2)}

=== Women's singles ===
- (Japan) Naomi Osaka defeated (Russia) Daria Kasatkina, 6–3, 6–2

=== Men's doubles ===
- (United States) John Isner / (United States) Jack Sock defeated (United States) Bob Bryan / (United States) Mike Bryan, 7–6^{(7–4)}, 7–6^{(7–2)}

=== Women's doubles ===
- (Chinese Taipei) Hsieh Su-wei / (Czech Republic) Barbora Strýcová defeated (Russia) Ekaterina Makarova / (Russia) Elena Vesnina, 6–4, 6–4

== Points and prize money ==
=== Point distribution ===
Event	W	F	SF	QF	Round of 16	Round of 32	Round of 64	Round of 128	Q	Q2	Q1
Men's singles	1000	600	360	180	90	45	25*	10	16	8	0
Men's doubles	1000	600	360	180	90	0	—	—	—	—	—
Women's singles	1000	650	390	215	120	65	35*	10	30	20	2
Women's doubles	1000	650	390	215	120	10	—	—	—	—	—

- Players with byes receive first-round points.

=== Prize money ===
Event	W	F	SF	QF	Round of 16	Round of 32	Round of 64	Round of 128	Q2	Q1
Men's singles	$1,340,860	$654,860	$327,965	$167,195	$88,135	$47,170	$25,465	$15,610	$4,650	$2,380
Women's singles	$1,340,860	$654,860	$327,965	$167,195	$88,135	$47,170	$25,465	$15,610	$4,650	$2,380
Men's doubles	$439,350	$214,410	$107,470	$54,760	$28,880	$15,460	—	—	—	—
Women's doubles	$439,350	$214,410	$107,470	$54,760	$28,880	$15,460	—	—	—	—

== ATP singles main-draw entrants ==
=== Seeds ===
The following are the seeded players. Rankings and seedings are based on ATP rankings as of March 5, 2018.

Seed	Rank	Player	Points before	Points defending	Points won	Points after	Status
1	1	(Switzerland) Roger Federer	10,060	1,000	600	9,660	Runner-up, lost to (Argentina) Juan Martín del Potro [6]
2	3	(Croatia) Marin Čilić	4,870	10	45	4,905	Third round lost to (Germany) Philipp Kohlschreiber [31]
3	4	(Bulgaria) Grigor Dimitrov	4,635	45	10	4,600	Second round lost to (Spain) Fernando Verdasco
4	5	(Germany) Alexander Zverev	4,540	45	10	4,505	Second round lost to (Portugal) João Sousa
5	6	(Austria) Dominic Thiem	3,810	180	45	3,675	Third round retired against (Uruguay) Pablo Cuevas [30]
6	8	(Argentina) Juan Martín del Potro	3,200	45	1000	4,155	Champion, defeated (Switzerland) Roger Federer [1]
7	9	(South Africa) Kevin Anderson	3,080	25	180	3,235	Quarterfinals lost to (Croatia) Borna Ćorić
8	10	(United States) Jack Sock	2,650	360	45	2,335	Third round lost to (Spain) Feliciano López [28]
9	12	(France) Lucas Pouille	2,455	45	10	2,420	Second round lost to (India) Yuki Bhambri [Q]
10	13	(Serbia) Novak Djokovic	2,380	90	10	2,300	Second round lost to (Japan) Taro Daniel [Q]
11	14	(Spain) Pablo Carreño Busta	2,315	360	90	2,045	Fourth round lost to (South Africa) Kevin Anderson [7]
12	15	(Czech Republic) Tomáš Berdych	2,275	45	45	2,275	Third round lost to (South Korea) Chung Hyeon [23]
13	16	(Spain) Roberto Bautista Agut	2,255	45	45	2,255	Third round lost to (Croatia) Borna Ćorić
14	17	(Argentina) Diego Schwartzman	2,220	10	10	2,220	Second round lost to (Cyprus) Marcos Baghdatis [Q]
15	18	(United States) John Isner	2,205	45	10	2,170	Second round lost to (France) Gaël Monfils
16	19	(Italy) Fabio Fognini	2,190	45	10	2,155	Second round lost to (France) Jérémy Chardy
~~17~~	~~20~~	~~(Australia) Nick Kyrgios~~	2,125	180	0	1,945	Withdrew due to right elbow injury
18	21	(United States) Sam Querrey	2,095	10	180	2,265	Quarterfinals lost to (Canada) Milos Raonic [32]
19	22	(Spain) Albert Ramos Viñolas	1,745	45	10	1,710	Second round lost to (Croatia) Borna Ćorić
20	23	(France) Adrian Mannarino	1,715	25	45	1,735	Third round lost to (France) Jérémy Chardy
21	24	(United Kingdom) Kyle Edmund	1,642	25	10	1,627	Second round lost to (Israel) Dudi Sela [LL]
~~22~~	~~25~~	(Japan) ~~Kei Nishikori~~	1,595	180	0	1,415	Withdrew due to illness
23	26	(South Korea) Chung Hyeon	1,567	(20)^{†}	180	1,727	Quarterfinals lost to (Switzerland) Roger Federer [1]
24	27	(Luxembourg) Gilles Müller	1,535	45	10	1,500	Second round lost to (France) Pierre-Hugues Herbert
25	28	(Serbia) Filip Krajinović	1,503	(9)^{†}	45	1,539	Third round lost to (Switzerland) Roger Federer [1]
26	30	(Bosnia and Herzegovina) Damir Džumhur	1,445	25	10	1,430	Second round lost to (Argentina) Nicolás Kicker
27	31	(Russia) Andrey Rublev	1,433	(50)^{‡}	10	1,393	Second round lost to (United States) Taylor Fritz
28	32	(Spain) Feliciano López	1,340	10	90	1,420	Fourth round lost to (United States) Sam Querrey [18]
29	33	(Spain) David Ferrer	1,325	0	45	1,370	Third round lost to (Argentina) Juan Martín del Potro [6]
30	34	(Uruguay) Pablo Cuevas	1,310	180	90	1,220	Fourth round lost to (South Korea) Chung Hyeon [23]
31	37	(Germany) Philipp Kohlschreiber	1,290	45	180	1,425	Quarterfinals lost to (Argentina) Juan Martín del Potro [6]
32	38	(Canada) Milos Raonic	1,270	0	360	1,630	Semifinals lost to (Argentina) Juan Martín del Potro [6]

† The player did not qualify for the tournament in 2017. Accordingly, points for his 18th best result are deducted instead.
‡ The player did not qualify for the tournament in 2017, but was defending points from an ATP Challenger Tour tournament.

=== Withdrawals ===
Rank	Player	Points before	Points defending	Points after	Reason
1	(Spain) Rafael Nadal	9,460	90	9,370	Right hip injury
7	(Belgium) David Goffin	3,280	90	3,190	Eye injury
11	(Switzerland) Stan Wawrinka	2,475	600	1,875	Knee injury
29	(United Kingdom) Andy Murray	1,460	10	1,450	Hip injury
35	(France) Jo-Wilfried Tsonga	1,310	10	1,300	Arm injury
36	(France) Richard Gasquet	1,305	0	1,305	Knee injury

=== Other entrants ===
The following players received wildcards into the singles main draw:

- (Australia) Alex de Minaur
- (United States) Ernesto Escobedo
- (United States) Bradley Klahn
- (United States) Reilly Opelka
- (United States) Tennys Sandgren

The following players received entry using a protected ranking into the main draw:

- (Japan) Yoshihito Nishioka

The following players received entry from the qualifying draw:

- (Canada) Félix Auger-Aliassime
- (Cyprus) Marcos Baghdatis
- (Lithuania) Ričardas Berankis
- (India) Yuki Bhambri
- (Japan) Taro Daniel
- (United States) Evan King
- (United States) Mitchell Krueger
- (France) Nicolas Mahut
- (United Kingdom) Cameron Norrie
- (Canada) Peter Polansky
- (Canada) Vasek Pospisil
- (United States) Tim Smyczek

The following players entered as lucky losers:

- (Belgium) Ruben Bemelmans
- (Italy) Matteo Berrettini
- (Israel) Dudi Sela

=== Withdrawals ===
Before the tournament

- (Slovenia) Aljaž Bedene → replaced by (Russia) Mikhail Youzhny
- (Ukraine) Alexandr Dolgopolov → replaced by (Croatia) Ivo Karlović
- (Spain) Guillermo García López → replaced by (Germany) Maximilian Marterer
- (France) Richard Gasquet → replaced by (Slovakia) Lukáš Lacko
- (Belgium) David Goffin → replaced by (Argentina) Nicolás Kicker
- (Netherlands) Robin Haase → replaced by (Moldova) Radu Albot
- (Uzbekistan) Denis Istomin → replaced by (Israel) Dudi Sela
- (Australia) Nick Kyrgios → replaced by (Italy) Matteo Berrettini
- (Italy) Paolo Lorenzi → replaced by (Greece) Stefanos Tsitsipas
- (Chinese Taipei) Lu Yen-hsun → replaced by (United States) Taylor Fritz
- (Germany) Florian Mayer → replaced by (United States) Frances Tiafoe
- (United Kingdom) Andy Murray → replaced by (Dominican Republic) Víctor Estrella Burgos
- (Spain) Rafael Nadal → replaced by (Romania) Marius Copil
- (Japan) Kei Nishikori → replaced by (Belgium) Ruben Bemelmans
- (Italy) Andreas Seppi → replaced by (Hungary) Márton Fucsovics
- (France) Jo-Wilfried Tsonga → replaced by (Serbia) Laslo Đere
- (Switzerland) Stan Wawrinka → replaced by (France) Jérémy Chardy

During the tournament

- (Cyprus) Marcos Baghdatis

=== Retirements ===
- (Georgia (country)) Nikoloz Basilashvili
- (France) Gaël Monfils
- (Austria) Dominic Thiem

== ATP doubles main-draw entrants ==
=== Seeds ===
Country	Player	Country	Player	Rank^{1}	Seed
POL	Łukasz Kubot	BRA	Marcelo Melo	2	1
FIN	Henri Kontinen	AUS	John Peers	7	2
AUT	Oliver Marach	CRO	Mate Pavić	11	3
GBR	Jamie Murray	BRA	Bruno Soares	17	4
FRA	Pierre-Hugues Herbert	FRA	Nicolas Mahut	20	5
NED	Jean-Julien Rojer	ROU	Horia Tecău	21	6
USA	Bob Bryan	USA	Mike Bryan	28	7
CRO	Ivan Dodig	USA	Rajeev Ram	33	8

- ^{1} Rankings as of March 5, 2018.

=== Other entrants ===
The following pairs received wildcards into the doubles main draw:

- (United States) Steve Johnson / (Canada) Daniel Nestor
- (Germany) Philipp Petzschner / (Austria) Dominic Thiem

== WTA singles main-draw entrants ==
=== Seeds ===
The following are the seeded players. Seedings are based on WTA rankings as of February 26, 2018. Rankings and points before are as of March 5, 2018.

Seed	Rank	Player	Points before	Points defending	Points won	Points after	Status
1	1	(Romania) Simona Halep	7,965	65	390	8,290	Semifinals lost to (Japan) Naomi Osaka
2	2	(Denmark) Caroline Wozniacki	7,525	215	120	7,430	Fourth round lost to (Russia) Daria Kasatkina [20]
3	3	(Spain) Garbiñe Muguruza	6,175	215	10	5,970	Second round lost to (United States) Sachia Vickery [Q]
4	4	(Ukraine) Elina Svitolina	5,480	120	65	5,425	Third round lost to (Spain) Carla Suárez Navarro [27]
5	5	(Czech Republic) Karolína Plíšková	5,080	390	215	4,905	Quarterfinals lost to (Japan) Naomi Osaka
6	6	(Latvia) Jeļena Ostapenko	4,941	35	65	4,971	Third round lost to (Croatia) Petra Martić
7	7	(France) Caroline Garcia	4,625	120	120	4,625	Fourth round lost to (Germany) Angelique Kerber [10]
8	8	(United States) Venus Williams	4,277	215	390	4,452	Semifinals lost to (Russia) Daria Kasatkina [20]
9	9	(Czech Republic) Petra Kvitová	3,086	0	65	3,151	Third round lost to (United States) Amanda Anisimova [WC]
10	10	(Germany) Angelique Kerber	3,055	120	215	3,150	Quarterfinals lost to (Russia) Daria Kasatkina [20]
11	11	(United Kingdom) Johanna Konta	2,930	65	10	2,875	Second round lost to (Czech Republic) Markéta Vondroušová
12	12	(Germany) Julia Görges	2,910	65	65	2,910	Third round lost to (Latvia) Anastasija Sevastova [21]
13	13	(United States) Sloane Stephens	2,873	0	65	2,938	Third round lost to (Russia) Daria Kasatkina [20]
14	15	(France) Kristina Mladenovic	2,605	390	65	2,280	Third round lost to (China) Wang Qiang
15	14	(United States) Madison Keys	2,703	120	10	2,593	Second round lost to (United States) Danielle Collins [WC]
16	21	(Australia) Ashleigh Barty	2,189	(1)^{†}	10	2,198	Second round lost to (Greece) Maria Sakkari
17	16	(United States) CoCo Vandeweghe	2,433	10	65	2,488	Third round lost to (Greece) Maria Sakkari
18	17	(Slovakia) Magdaléna Rybáriková	2,405	(20)^{†}	10	2,395	Second round lost to (Russia) Sofya Zhuk [WC]
19	18	(Russia) Svetlana Kuznetsova	2,362	650	10	1,722	Second round lost to (Belarus) Aryna Sabalenka
20	19	(Russia) Daria Kasatkina	2,300	10	650	2,940	Runner-up, lost to (Japan) Naomi Osaka
21	20	(Latvia) Anastasija Sevastova	2,295	10	120	2,405	Fourth round lost to (United States) Venus Williams [8]
22	22	(Belgium) Elise Mertens	2,185	(30)^{†}	10	2,165	Second round lost to (China) Wang Qiang
23	23	(Russia) Anastasia Pavlyuchenkova	2,125	215	10	1,920	Second round lost to (United States) Amanda Anisimova [WC]
24	24	(Russia) Elena Vesnina	2,110	1,000	65	1,175	Third round lost to (Germany) Angelique Kerber [10]
25	25	(Czech Republic) Barbora Strýcová	1,980	65	10	1,925	Second round lost to (Croatia) Petra Martić
26	26	(Australia) Daria Gavrilova	1,870	65	65	1,870	Third round lost to (France) Caroline Garcia [7]
27	27	(Spain) Carla Suárez Navarro	1,785	10	215	1,990	Quarterfinals lost to (United States) Venus Williams [8]
28	28	(Estonia) Anett Kontaveit	1,765	65	10	1,710	Second round lost to (Belarus) Aliaksandra Sasnovich
29	29	(Netherlands) Kiki Bertens	1,725	65	10	1,670	Second round lost to (United States) Serena Williams
30	30	(Slovakia) Dominika Cibulková	1,610	120	10	1,500	Second round lost to (United States) Caroline Dolehide [WC]
31	32	(Poland) Agnieszka Radwańska	1,525	65	10	1,470	Second round lost to (Japan) Naomi Osaka
32	33	(China) Zhang Shuai	1,500	10	65	1,555	Third round lost to (Czech Republic) Karolína Plíšková [5]

† The player did not qualify for the tournament in 2017. Accordingly, points for her 16th best result are deducted instead.

=== Other entrants ===
The following players received wildcards into the singles main draw:

- (United States) Amanda Anisimova
- (Belarus) Victoria Azarenka
- (Canada) Eugenie Bouchard
- (United States) Danielle Collins
- (United States) Kayla Day
- (United States) Caroline Dolehide
- (United States) Claire Liu
- (Russia) Sofya Zhuk

The following players received entry from the qualifying draw:

- (Spain) Lara Arruabarrena
- (United States) Madison Brengle
- (China) Duan Yingying
- (Chinese Taipei) Hsieh Su-wei
- (United States) Sofia Kenin
- (Japan) Kurumi Nara
- (Romania) Monica Niculescu
- (Spain) Sara Sorribes Tormo
- (United States) Taylor Townsend
- (United States) Sachia Vickery
- (Belgium) Yanina Wickmayer
- (Russia) Vera Zvonareva

=== Withdrawals ===
Before the tournament

- (Russia) Margarita Gasparyan → replaced by (Switzerland) Belinda Bencic
- (Italy) Camila Giorgi → replaced by (France) Pauline Parmentier
- (Croatia) Ana Konjuh → replaced by (Estonia) Kaia Kanepi
- (Croatia) Mirjana Lučić-Baroni → replaced by (Belgium) Alison Van Uytvanck
- (China) Peng Shuai → replaced by (Paraguay) Verónica Cepede Royg
- (Czech Republic) Lucie Šafářová → replaced by (Croatia) Petra Martić
- (Germany) Laura Siegemund → replaced by (United States) Lauren Davis

=== Retirements ===
- (Czech Republic) Kateřina Siniaková
- (Germany) Carina Witthöft

== WTA doubles main-draw entrants ==
=== Seeds ===
Country	Player	Country	Player	Rank^{1}	Seed
RUS	Ekaterina Makarova	RUS	Elena Vesnina	6	1
TPE	Chan Hao-ching	TPE	Latisha Chan	16	2
CAN	Gabriela Dabrowski	CHN	Xu Yifan	20	3
HUN	Tímea Babos	FRA	Kristina Mladenovic	23	4
ROU	Monica Niculescu	CZE	Andrea Sestini Hlaváčková	23	5
CZE	Barbora Krejčíková	CZE	Kateřina Siniaková	42	6
NED	Kiki Bertens	SWE	Johanna Larsson	44	7
SLO	Andreja Klepač	ESP	María José Martínez Sánchez	44	8

- ^{1} Rankings as of February 26, 2018.

=== Other entrants ===
The following pairs received wildcards into the doubles main draw:

- (Belarus) Victoria Azarenka / (Belarus) Aryna Sabalenka
- (Canada) Eugenie Bouchard / (United States) Sloane Stephens
- (Czech Republic) Karolína Plíšková / (Czech Republic) Kristýna Plíšková
