= 2016 ITF Men's Circuit (April–June) =

Tennis tournament

The 2016 ITF Men's Circuit is the 2016 edition of the second tier tour for men's professional tennis. It is organised by the International Tennis Federation and is a tier below the ATP Tour. The ITF Men's Circuit includes tournaments with prize money ranging from $10,000 up to $25,000.

== Key ==
$25,000 tournaments
$10,000 tournaments

== Month ==
=== April ===
Week of	Tournament	Winner	Runners-up	Semifinalists	Quarterfinalists
April 4	China F4 Futures; Zhangjiagang, China; Hard $25,000; Singles and doubles draws	(Chinese Taipei) Jimmy Wang; 7–5, 6–3	(South Korea) Lee Duck-hee	(India) Sriram Balaji (Italy) Matteo Viola	(China) Wang Chuhan (Japan) Shuichi Sekiguchi (India) Vijay Sundar Prashanth (Japan) Kaichi Uchida
April 4	China F4 Futures; Zhangjiagang, China; Hard $25,000; Singles and doubles draws	(Chinese Taipei) Hsieh Cheng-peng (Chinese Taipei) Peng Hsien-yin; 7–6^{(7–4)}, 6–3	(India) Sriram Balaji (Japan) Shuichi Sekiguchi	(India) Sriram Balaji (Italy) Matteo Viola	(China) Wang Chuhan (Japan) Shuichi Sekiguchi (India) Vijay Sundar Prashanth (Japan) Kaichi Uchida
April 4	United States F12 Futures; Memphis, USA; Hard $25,000; Singles and doubles draws	(Canada) Denis Shapovalov; 7–6^{(7–4)}, 7–6^{(7–4)}	(United States) Tennys Sandgren	(United States) Dennis Nevolo (United States) Ryan Haviland	(Sweden) Christian Lindell (South Africa) Nicolaas Scholtz (Germany) Jan Choinski (United States) Alex Kuznetsov
April 4	United States F12 Futures; Memphis, USA; Hard $25,000; Singles and doubles draws	(United Kingdom) Luke Bambridge (United Kingdom) Darren Walsh; 6–1, 6–2	(Mexico) Daniel Garza (Mexico) Tigre Hank	(United States) Dennis Nevolo (United States) Ryan Haviland	(Sweden) Christian Lindell (South Africa) Nicolaas Scholtz (Germany) Jan Choinski (United States) Alex Kuznetsov
April 4	Uzbekistan F1 Futures; Qarshi, Uzbekistan; Hard $25,000; Singles and doubles draws	(Belarus) Ilya Ivashka; 6–3, 1–6, 6–1	(Uzbekistan) Jurabek Karimov	(Uzbekistan) Khumoyun Sultonov (Czech Republic) Michal Konečný	(Russia) Denis Matsukevich (Belarus) Yaraslav Shyla (Uzbekistan) Sanjar Fayziev (Georgia (country)) Aleksandre Metreveli
April 4	Uzbekistan F1 Futures; Qarshi, Uzbekistan; Hard $25,000; Singles and doubles draws	(Chinese Taipei) Chen Ti (India) Sumit Nagal; 5–5, ret.	(Uzbekistan) Sanjar Fayziev (Uzbekistan) Jurabek Karimov	(Uzbekistan) Khumoyun Sultonov (Czech Republic) Michal Konečný	(Russia) Denis Matsukevich (Belarus) Yaraslav Shyla (Uzbekistan) Sanjar Fayziev (Georgia (country)) Aleksandre Metreveli
April 4	Egypt F12 Futures; Sharm el-Sheikh, Egypt; Hard $10,000; Singles and doubles draws	(Serbia) Marko Tepavac; 7–6^{(7–5)}, 6–4	(Egypt) Mohamed Safwat	(South Africa) Tucker Vorster (Czech Republic) Jaroslav Pospíšil	(France) Lény Mitjana (Ukraine) Vadim Alekseenko (Spain) José Francisco Vidal Azorín (France) Jordan Ubiergo
April 4	Egypt F12 Futures; Sharm el-Sheikh, Egypt; Hard $10,000; Singles and doubles draws	(United States) Anderson Reed (South Africa) Tucker Vorster; 6–7^{(3–7)}, 6–2, [10–5]	(Czech Republic) Petr Hájek (Czech Republic) Jaroslav Pospíšil	(South Africa) Tucker Vorster (Czech Republic) Jaroslav Pospíšil	(France) Lény Mitjana (Ukraine) Vadim Alekseenko (Spain) José Francisco Vidal Azorín (France) Jordan Ubiergo
April 4	Greece F3 Futures; Heraklion, Greece; Hard $10,000; Singles and doubles draws	(Australia) Bradley Mousley; 6–4, 6–3	(Ukraine) Vladyslav Manafov	(Sweden) Isak Arvidsson (Barbados) Darian King	(Czech Republic) Jan Mertl (United Kingdom) Jonny O'Mara (Venezuela) Ricardo Rodríguez (Slovakia) Alex Molčan
April 4	Greece F3 Futures; Heraklion, Greece; Hard $10,000; Singles and doubles draws	(Barbados) Darian King (Venezuela) Ricardo Rodríguez; 7–6^{(8–6)}, 6–1	(Sweden) Daniel Appelgren (Sweden) Christian Samuelsson	(Sweden) Isak Arvidsson (Barbados) Darian King	(Czech Republic) Jan Mertl (United Kingdom) Jonny O'Mara (Venezuela) Ricardo Rodríguez (Slovakia) Alex Molčan
April 4	Italy F4 Futures; San Carlo Canavese, Italy; Hard (indoor) $10,000; Singles and doubles draws	(Italy) Alessandro Bega; 6–4, 1–6, 6–4	(France) Rémi Boutillier	(Italy) Erik Crepaldi (France) Élie Rousset	(France) Yannick Jankovits (Croatia) Viktor Galović (Netherlands) Miliaan Niesten (France) Antoine Escoffier
April 4	Italy F4 Futures; San Carlo Canavese, Italy; Hard (indoor) $10,000; Singles and doubles draws	(France) Yannick Jankovits (France) Matthieu Roy; 7–6^{(7–2)}, 7–6^{(7–2)}	(Italy) Alberto Bagarello (Italy) Ettore Capello	(Italy) Erik Crepaldi (France) Élie Rousset	(France) Yannick Jankovits (Croatia) Viktor Galović (Netherlands) Miliaan Niesten (France) Antoine Escoffier
April 4	Japan F5 Futures; Kashiwa, Japan; Hard $10,000; Singles and doubles draws	(Japan) Yosuke Watanuki; 6–3, 6–3	(Japan) Makoto Ochi	(Japan) Sho Katayama (Japan) Yuya Kibi	(Japan) Takuto Niki (Japan) Ryota Kishi (Japan) Yuichi Ito (Japan) Yusuke Takahashi
April 4	Japan F5 Futures; Kashiwa, Japan; Hard $10,000; Singles and doubles draws	(Japan) Yuichi Ito (Japan) Sho Katayama; 6–3, 6–3	(Japan) Shintaro Imai (Japan) Takuto Niki	(Japan) Sho Katayama (Japan) Yuya Kibi	(Japan) Takuto Niki (Japan) Ryota Kishi (Japan) Yuichi Ito (Japan) Yusuke Takahashi
April 4	Qatar F1 Futures; Doha, Qatar; Hard $10,000; Singles and doubles draws	(Russia) Evgeny Karlovskiy; 7–6^{(7–4)}, 6–3	(Switzerland) Adrien Bossel	(Netherlands) Tallon Griekspoor (France) Benjamin Bonzi	(France) Tak Khunn Wang (Republic of Ireland) Sam Barry (Austria) Bernd Kossler (Netherlands) Scott Griekspoor
April 4	Qatar F1 Futures; Doha, Qatar; Hard $10,000; Singles and doubles draws	(Switzerland) Antoine Bellier (France) Benjamin Bonzi; 6–3, 6–2	(United Kingdom) Daniel Cox (Sweden) Milos Sekulic	(Netherlands) Tallon Griekspoor (France) Benjamin Bonzi	(France) Tak Khunn Wang (Republic of Ireland) Sam Barry (Austria) Bernd Kossler (Netherlands) Scott Griekspoor
April 4	Spain F8 Futures; Madrid, Spain; Hard $10,000; Singles and doubles draws	(Spain) Pablo Vivero González; 7–5, 6–1	(Spain) Roberto Ortega Olmedo	(India) Ramkumar Ramanathan (Australia) Alex De Minaur	(Japan) Akira Santillan (Spain) Ricardo Ojeda Lara (Germany) Daniel Masur (Spain) Andrés Artuñedo
April 4	Spain F8 Futures; Madrid, Spain; Hard $10,000; Singles and doubles draws	(Spain) Carlos Boluda-Purkiss (Australia) Alex De Minaur; 6–4, 6–4	(Spain) Carlos Gómez-Herrera (Japan) Akira Santillan	(India) Ramkumar Ramanathan (Australia) Alex De Minaur	(Japan) Akira Santillan (Spain) Ricardo Ojeda Lara (Germany) Daniel Masur (Spain) Andrés Artuñedo
April 4	Tunisia F13 Futures; Hammamet, Tunisia; Clay $10,000; Singles and doubles draws	(Germany) Maximilian Marterer; 6–2, 6–1	(France) Jules Okala	(Belgium) Omar Salman (Australia) Dan Dowson	(Germany) Paul Wörner (United Kingdom) Alexander Ward (France) Gleb Sakharov (Germany) Florian Fallert
April 4	Tunisia F13 Futures; Hammamet, Tunisia; Clay $10,000; Singles and doubles draws	(United States) Cătălin-Ionuț Gârd (Portugal) Frederico Gil; 6–4, 6–2	(Chile) Mauricio Álvarez-Guzmán (Chile) Guillermo Rivera-Aránguiz	(Belgium) Omar Salman (Australia) Dan Dowson	(Germany) Paul Wörner (United Kingdom) Alexander Ward (France) Gleb Sakharov (Germany) Florian Fallert
April 4	Turkey F14 Futures; Antalya, Turkey; Hard $10,000; Singles and doubles draws	(Germany) Marc Sieber; 5–7, 7–5, 6–3	(Austria) Sebastian Ofner	(Belgium) Michael Geerts (Croatia) Franjo Raspudić	(Lithuania) Lukas Mugevičius (Germany) Christian Hirschmüller (Germany) Nils Brinkmann (Germany) Elmar Ejupovic
April 4	Turkey F14 Futures; Antalya, Turkey; Hard $10,000; Singles and doubles draws	(Lithuania) Lukas Mugevičius (Russia) Alexander Vasilenko; 6–2, 6–2	(Belgium) Michael Geerts (Spain) David Pérez Sanz	(Belgium) Michael Geerts (Croatia) Franjo Raspudić	(Lithuania) Lukas Mugevičius (Germany) Christian Hirschmüller (Germany) Nils Brinkmann (Germany) Elmar Ejupovic
April 11	China F5 Futures; Taizhou, China; Hard $25,000; Singles and doubles draws	(Colombia) Nicolás Barrientos; 6–4, 6–1	(Japan) Shuichi Sekiguchi	(India) Vijay Sundar Prashanth (China) Wang Chuhan	(Chinese Taipei) Lee Kuan-yi (China) Te Rigele (China) Ouyang Bowen (India) Ranjeet Virali-Murugesan
April 11	China F5 Futures; Taizhou, China; Hard $25,000; Singles and doubles draws	(India) Vijay Sundar Prashanth (Indonesia) Christopher Rungkat; 6–4, 6–0	(Philippines) Jeson Patrombon (China) Wang Aoran	(India) Vijay Sundar Prashanth (China) Wang Chuhan	(Chinese Taipei) Lee Kuan-yi (China) Te Rigele (China) Ouyang Bowen (India) Ranjeet Virali-Murugesan
April 11	United States F13 Futures; Little Rock, USA; Hard $25,000; Singles and doubles draws	(United States) Stefan Kozlov; 6–7^{(3–7)}, 6–3, 7–6^{(12–10)}	(United States) Eric Quigley	(United States) Dennis Nevolo (United States) Tennys Sandgren	(Sweden) Christian Lindell (Canada) Philip Bester (United States) Evan King (United States) Christian Harrison
April 11	United States F13 Futures; Little Rock, USA; Hard $25,000; Singles and doubles draws	(United States) Ryan Lipman (United States) Tennys Sandgren; 6–3, 6–2	(United States) Nick Chappell (United States) Dane Webb	(United States) Dennis Nevolo (United States) Tennys Sandgren	(Sweden) Christian Lindell (Canada) Philip Bester (United States) Evan King (United States) Christian Harrison
April 11	Uzbekistan F2 Futures; Bukhara, Uzbekistan; Hard $25,000; Singles and doubles draws	(Belarus) Ilya Ivashka; 6–1, 6–1	(Uzbekistan) Temur Ismailov	(Bosnia and Herzegovina) Tomislav Brkić (Uzbekistan) Khumoyun Sultonov	(Chinese Taipei) Chen Ti (Croatia) Duje Kekez (Russia) Mikhail Ledovskikh (Russia) Evgeny Elistratov
April 11	Uzbekistan F2 Futures; Bukhara, Uzbekistan; Hard $25,000; Singles and doubles draws	(Belgium) Sander Gillé (Belgium) Joran Vliegen; 6–4, 6–3	(Russia) Evgeny Elistratov (Russia) Vitaly Kozyukov	(Bosnia and Herzegovina) Tomislav Brkić (Uzbekistan) Khumoyun Sultonov	(Chinese Taipei) Chen Ti (Croatia) Duje Kekez (Russia) Mikhail Ledovskikh (Russia) Evgeny Elistratov
April 11	Greece F4 Futures; Heraklion, Greece; Hard $10,000; Singles and doubles draws	(Belgium) Yannick Mertens; 6–2, 7–5	(United Kingdom) Lloyd Glasspool	(Slovakia) Patrik Fabian (Barbados) Darian King	(France) Alexandre Müller (United Kingdom) Edward Corrie (France) Thomas Bréchemier (Ukraine) Vladyslav Manafov
April 11	Greece F4 Futures; Heraklion, Greece; Hard $10,000; Singles and doubles draws	(Ukraine) Vladyslav Manafov (Australia) Bradley Mousley; 6–2, 6–3	(United Kingdom) Edward Corrie (United Kingdom) Lloyd Glasspool	(Slovakia) Patrik Fabian (Barbados) Darian King	(France) Alexandre Müller (United Kingdom) Edward Corrie (France) Thomas Bréchemier (Ukraine) Vladyslav Manafov
April 11	Italy F6 Futures; Pula, Italy; Clay $10,000; Singles and doubles draws	(Greece) Stefanos Tsitsipas; 6–3, 6–1	(Italy) Erik Crepaldi	(Italy) Filippo Leonardi (Czech Republic) Michal Schmid	(Germany) Daniel Altmaier (Brazil) Thales Turini (Lithuania) Laurynas Grigelis (Netherlands) Tim van Rijthoven
April 11	Italy F6 Futures; Pula, Italy; Clay $10,000; Singles and doubles draws	(Lithuania) Laurynas Grigelis (Italy) Francesco Moncagatto; 6–3, 6–0	(France) Jérôme Inzerillo (France) Yannick Jankovits	(Italy) Filippo Leonardi (Czech Republic) Michal Schmid	(Germany) Daniel Altmaier (Brazil) Thales Turini (Lithuania) Laurynas Grigelis (Netherlands) Tim van Rijthoven
April 11	Qatar F2 Futures; Doha, Qatar; Hard $10,000; Singles and doubles draws	(Russia) Alexander Bublik; 7–6^{(7–4)}, 7–6^{(9–7)}	(France) Benjamin Bonzi	(United Kingdom) Daniel Cox (France) Baptiste Crepatte	(Czech Republic) Jan Hernych (United Kingdom) James Marsalek (Qatar) Mubarak Shannan Zayid (Switzerland) Antoine Bellier
April 11	Qatar F2 Futures; Doha, Qatar; Hard $10,000; Singles and doubles draws	(Switzerland) Antoine Bellier (France) Benjamin Bonzi; 7–6^{(7–5)}, 6–3	(Tunisia) Anis Ghorbel (France) Tak Khunn Wang	(United Kingdom) Daniel Cox (France) Baptiste Crepatte	(Czech Republic) Jan Hernych (United Kingdom) James Marsalek (Qatar) Mubarak Shannan Zayid (Switzerland) Antoine Bellier
April 11	Spain F9 Futures; Reus, Spain; Clay $10,000; Singles and doubles draws	(Chile) Bastián Malla; 6–2, 6–3	(Spain) Jordi Samper-Montaña	(Spain) Marc Giner (Spain) Jaume Pla Malfeito	(Poland) Paweł Ciaś (Spain) Ricardo Ojeda Lara (India) Sasikumar Mukund (Spain) Andrés Artuñedo
April 11	Spain F9 Futures; Reus, Spain; Clay $10,000; Singles and doubles draws	(Spain) Juan-Samuel Arauzo-Martínez (Spain) Marcos Giraldi Requena; 3–6, 6–3, [10–8]	(Spain) Adria Mas Mascolo (Spain) David Vega Hernández	(Spain) Marc Giner (Spain) Jaume Pla Malfeito	(Poland) Paweł Ciaś (Spain) Ricardo Ojeda Lara (India) Sasikumar Mukund (Spain) Andrés Artuñedo
April 11	Tunisia F14 Futures; Hammamet, Tunisia; Clay $10,000; Singles and doubles draws	(Austria) Dennis Novak; 7–6^{(7–4)}, 6–3	(Austria) Pascal Brunner	(Slovakia) Filip Horanský (Ukraine) Artem Smirnov	(Germany) Kevin Krawietz (Argentina) Hernán Casanova (Italy) Antonio Campo (Germany) Paul Wörner
April 11	Tunisia F14 Futures; Hammamet, Tunisia; Clay $10,000; Singles and doubles draws	(United States) Cătălin-Ionuț Gârd (Portugal) Frederico Gil; 6–3, 5–7, [10–3]	(Austria) Pascal Brunner (Germany) Kevin Krawietz	(Slovakia) Filip Horanský (Ukraine) Artem Smirnov	(Germany) Kevin Krawietz (Argentina) Hernán Casanova (Italy) Antonio Campo (Germany) Paul Wörner
April 11	Turkey F15 Futures; Antalya, Turkey; Hard $10,000; Singles and doubles draws	(Germany) Marc Sieber; 2–6, 6–4, 6–4	(Turkey) Cem İlkel	(Belgium) Stijn Meulemans (Germany) Elmar Ejupovic	(Austria) David Pichler (Japan) Shunsuke Wakita (France) Hugo Voljacques (India) Sanam Singh
April 11	Turkey F15 Futures; Antalya, Turkey; Hard $10,000; Singles and doubles draws	(Lithuania) Lukas Mugevičius (Austria) David Pichler; 6–4, 6–4	(Uruguay) Martín Cuevas (Brazil) Henrique Cunha	(Belgium) Stijn Meulemans (Germany) Elmar Ejupovic	(Austria) David Pichler (Japan) Shunsuke Wakita (France) Hugo Voljacques (India) Sanam Singh
April 18	France F8 Futures; Angers, France; Clay (indoor) $25,000; Singles and doubles draws	(France) Grégoire Barrère; 7–6^{(7–2)}, 6–4	(France) Jonathan Eysseric	(Belgium) Maxime Authom (France) Gleb Sakharov	(Belgium) Niels Desein (France) Adrien Puget (France) Alexandre Penaud (France) Maxime Janvier
April 18	France F8 Futures; Angers, France; Clay (indoor) $25,000; Singles and doubles draws	(Belgium) Maxime Authom (France) Jonathan Eysseric; 6–3, 6–0	(France) Grégoire Barrère (France) Adrien Puget	(Belgium) Maxime Authom (France) Gleb Sakharov	(Belgium) Niels Desein (France) Adrien Puget (France) Alexandre Penaud (France) Maxime Janvier
April 18	Kazakhstan F3 Futures; Shymkent, Kazakhstan; Clay $25,000; Singles and doubles draws	(Belarus) Maxim Dubarenco; 6–3, 7–6^{(7–3)}	(Serbia) Miki Janković	(Kazakhstan) Dmitry Popko (Ukraine) Stanislav Poplavskyy	(Slovakia) Alex Molčan (Argentina) Matías Zukas (Georgia (country)) Aleksandre Metreveli (Ukraine) Artem Smirnov
April 18	Kazakhstan F3 Futures; Shymkent, Kazakhstan; Clay $25,000; Singles and doubles draws	(Uzbekistan) Sanjar Fayziev (Belarus) Andrei Vasilevski; 6–2, 6–4	(Russia) Markos Kalovelonis (Georgia (country)) Aleksandre Metreveli	(Kazakhstan) Dmitry Popko (Ukraine) Stanislav Poplavskyy	(Slovakia) Alex Molčan (Argentina) Matías Zukas (Georgia (country)) Aleksandre Metreveli (Ukraine) Artem Smirnov
April 18	Nigeria F1 Futures; Abuja, Nigeria; Hard $25,000+H; Singles and doubles draws	(Netherlands) Antal van der Duim; 7–5, 6–3	(Egypt) Mohamed Safwat	(Spain) David Pérez Sanz (United States) Nicolas Meister	(Serbia) Ilija Vučić (Australia) Darren Polkinghorne (Zimbabwe) Takanyi Garanganga (Austria) Lenny Hampel
April 18	Nigeria F1 Futures; Abuja, Nigeria; Hard $25,000+H; Singles and doubles draws	(United States) Nicolas Meister (Spain) David Pérez Sanz; 6–3, 6–4	(Egypt) Karim-Mohamed Maamoun (Egypt) Mohamed Safwat	(Spain) David Pérez Sanz (United States) Nicolas Meister	(Serbia) Ilija Vučić (Australia) Darren Polkinghorne (Zimbabwe) Takanyi Garanganga (Austria) Lenny Hampel
April 18	Greece F5 Futures; Heraklion, Greece; Hard $10,000; Singles and doubles draws	(United Kingdom) Lloyd Glasspool; 6–3, 4–6, 7–6^{(7–3)}	(United Kingdom) Jonny O'Mara	(Barbados) Darian King (France) Mick Lescure	(France) Alexandre Müller (Latvia) Miķelis Lībietis (Israel) Daniel Cukierman (Ukraine) Vladyslav Manafov
April 18	Greece F5 Futures; Heraklion, Greece; Hard $10,000; Singles and doubles draws	(Poland) Karol Drzewiecki (Brazil) Bruno Sant'Anna; 7–6^{(7–3)}, 2–6, [10–7]	(Ukraine) Vladyslav Manafov (Australia) Bradley Mousley	(Barbados) Darian King (France) Mick Lescure	(France) Alexandre Müller (Latvia) Miķelis Lībietis (Israel) Daniel Cukierman (Ukraine) Vladyslav Manafov
April 18	Hungary F1 Futures; Szeged, Hungary; Clay $10,000; Singles and doubles draws	(Italy) Gianluigi Quinzi; 6–3, 7–5	(Poland) Grzegorz Panfil	(Croatia) Kristijan Mesaroš (Poland) Kamil Majchrzak	(Belgium) Germain Gigounon (Canada) Frank Dancevic (Italy) Riccardo Bellotti (Hungary) Máté Valkusz
April 18	Hungary F1 Futures; Szeged, Hungary; Clay $10,000; Singles and doubles draws	(Austria) Lucas Miedler (Italy) Gianluigi Quinzi; 7–6^{(7–5)}, 6–2	(Slovenia) Aljaž Radinski (Slovenia) Tomislav Ternar	(Croatia) Kristijan Mesaroš (Poland) Kamil Majchrzak	(Belgium) Germain Gigounon (Canada) Frank Dancevic (Italy) Riccardo Bellotti (Hungary) Máté Valkusz
April 18	Italy F7 Futures; Pula, Italy; Clay $10,000; Singles and doubles draws	(France) Laurent Lokoli; 6–3, 6–2	(Netherlands) Tim van Rijthoven	(France) Enzo Couacaud (Italy) Riccardo Bonadio	(Italy) Pietro Rondoni (Italy) Riccardo Sinicropi (Greece) Stefanos Tsitsipas (Italy) Andrea Pellegrino
April 18	Italy F7 Futures; Pula, Italy; Clay $10,000; Singles and doubles draws	(Argentina) Franco Agamenone (Italy) Francisco Bahamonde; 6–3, 6–3	(Germany) Julian Onken (Germany) Leon Schutt	(France) Enzo Couacaud (Italy) Riccardo Bonadio	(Italy) Pietro Rondoni (Italy) Riccardo Sinicropi (Greece) Stefanos Tsitsipas (Italy) Andrea Pellegrino
April 18	Qatar F3 Futures; Doha, Qatar; Hard $10,000; Singles and doubles draws	(France) Tak Khunn Wang; 6–0, 4–6, 6–2	(Russia) Alexander Bublik	(Switzerland) Antoine Bellier (United States) Gonzales Austin	(France) Romain Bauvy (France) Benjamin Bonzi (France) Antoine Escoffier (Portugal) Romain Barbosa
April 18	Qatar F3 Futures; Doha, Qatar; Hard $10,000; Singles and doubles draws	(Switzerland) Antoine Bellier (France) Benjamin Bonzi; 6–2, 1–6, [11–9]	(Tunisia) Anis Ghorbel (France) Tak Khunn Wang	(Switzerland) Antoine Bellier (United States) Gonzales Austin	(France) Romain Bauvy (France) Benjamin Bonzi (France) Antoine Escoffier (Portugal) Romain Barbosa
April 18	Spain F10 Futures; Majadahonda, Spain; Clay $10,000; Singles and doubles draws	(Spain) Bernabé Zapata Miralles; 6–7^{(4–7)}, 7–6^{(8–6)}, 4–0, ret.	(Chile) Bastián Malla	(Spain) Ricardo Ojeda Lara (Spain) Roberto Ortega Olmedo	(Spain) Palbo Vivero González (Spain) Albert Alcaraz Ivorra (Spain) Marc Giner (Australia) Alex De Minaur
April 18	Spain F10 Futures; Majadahonda, Spain; Clay $10,000; Singles and doubles draws	(Spain) Roberto Ortega Olmedo (Spain) Georgi Rumenov Payakov; 6–0, 6–1	(Spain) Andrés Artuñedo (Spain) Ricardo Ojeda Lara	(Spain) Ricardo Ojeda Lara (Spain) Roberto Ortega Olmedo	(Spain) Palbo Vivero González (Spain) Albert Alcaraz Ivorra (Spain) Marc Giner (Australia) Alex De Minaur
April 18	Tunisia F15 Futures; Hammamet, Tunisia; Clay $10,000; Singles and doubles draws	(France) Antoine Hoang; 7–6^{(7–4)}, 6–2	(Austria) Pascal Brunner	(Argentina) Juan Pablo Paz (France) Gianni Mina	(France) Alexis Musialek (Spain) Marcos Giraldi Requena (Portugal) Frederico Gil (Russia) Maxim Ratniuk
April 18	Tunisia F15 Futures; Hammamet, Tunisia; Clay $10,000; Singles and doubles draws	(United States) Cătălin-Ionuț Gârd (Germany) Andreas Mies; 7–5, 6–4	(Germany) Kevin Krawietz (France) Gianni Mina	(Argentina) Juan Pablo Paz (France) Gianni Mina	(France) Alexis Musialek (Spain) Marcos Giraldi Requena (Portugal) Frederico Gil (Russia) Maxim Ratniuk
April 18	Turkey F16 Futures; Antalya, Turkey; Hard $10,000; Singles and doubles draws	(Belgium) Christopher Heyman; 7–6^{(7–4)}, 6–0	(United Kingdom) Richard Gabb	(Lithuania) Lukas Mugevičius (Belgium) Julien Dubail	(United Kingdom) Imran Aswat (Italy) Lorenzo Frigerio (Belgium) Maxime Pauwels (Germany) Christoph Negritu
April 18	Turkey F16 Futures; Antalya, Turkey; Hard $10,000; Singles and doubles draws	(Slovakia) Maroš Horný (Slovakia) Patrik Néma; 6–4, 6–1	(South Korea) Kang Ku-keon (South Korea) Moon Ju-hae	(Lithuania) Lukas Mugevičius (Belgium) Julien Dubail	(United Kingdom) Imran Aswat (Italy) Lorenzo Frigerio (Belgium) Maxime Pauwels (Germany) Christoph Negritu
April 18	United States F14 Futures; Orange Park, USA; Clay $10,000; Singles and doubles draws	(Canada) Denis Shapovalov; 7–5, 2–6, 7–6^{(8–6)}	(Serbia) Miomir Kecmanović	(United States) Patrick Daciek (United States) Alexios Halebian	(United States) Evan King (Colombia) Felipe Mantilla (Peru) Mauricio Echazú (United States) Junior Alexander Ore
April 18	United States F14 Futures; Orange Park, USA; Clay $10,000; Singles and doubles draws	(Hungary) Péter Nagy (Canada) Denis Shapovalov; 6–2, 6–3	(Philippines) Ruben Gonzales (United States) Dennis Nevolo	(United States) Patrick Daciek (United States) Alexios Halebian	(United States) Evan King (Colombia) Felipe Mantilla (Peru) Mauricio Echazú (United States) Junior Alexander Ore
April 25	France F9 Futures; Grasse, France; Clay $25,000; Singles and doubles draws	(France) Maxime Janvier; 4–6, 7–5, 7–6^{(8–6)}	(Germany) Andreas Beck	(France) Sébastien Boltz (Germany) Pascal Meis	(Monaco) Benjamin Balleret (France) Grégoire Jacq (France) Corentin Denolly (Belgium) Julien Cagnina
April 25	France F9 Futures; Grasse, France; Clay $25,000; Singles and doubles draws	(Belgium) Maxime Authom (Germany) Andreas Beck; 6–4, 6–3	(Spain) Marc Fornell (Portugal) Gonçalo Oliveira	(France) Sébastien Boltz (Germany) Pascal Meis	(Monaco) Benjamin Balleret (France) Grégoire Jacq (France) Corentin Denolly (Belgium) Julien Cagnina
April 25	Kazakhstan F4 Futures; Shymkent, Kazakhstan; Clay $25,000; Singles and doubles draws	(Kazakhstan) Dmitry Popko; 6–3, 4–6, 6–3	(Ukraine) Artem Smirnov	(Serbia) Miki Janković (Georgia (country)) Aleksandre Metreveli	(Belarus) Maxim Dubarenco (Slovakia) Alex Molčan (Belarus) Andrei Vasilevski (Russia) Markos Kalovelonis
April 25	Kazakhstan F4 Futures; Shymkent, Kazakhstan; Clay $25,000; Singles and doubles draws	(Russia) Markos Kalovelonis (Georgia (country)) Aleksandre Metreveli; 6–4, 6–1	(Serbia) Miki Janković (Belarus) Andrei Vasilevski	(Serbia) Miki Janković (Georgia (country)) Aleksandre Metreveli	(Belarus) Maxim Dubarenco (Slovakia) Alex Molčan (Belarus) Andrei Vasilevski (Russia) Markos Kalovelonis
April 25	Nigeria F2 Futures; Abuja, Nigeria; Hard $25,000+H; Singles and doubles draws	(Egypt) Mohamed Safwat; 6–4, 4–2, ret.	(Bosnia and Herzegovina) Aldin Šetkić	(Egypt) Karim-Mohamed Maamoun (United States) Nicolas Meister	(Russia) Yan Sabanin (Uganda) Duncan Mugabe (Netherlands) Antal van der Duim (Spain) David Pérez Sanz
April 25	Nigeria F2 Futures; Abuja, Nigeria; Hard $25,000+H; Singles and doubles draws	(Netherlands) David Pel (Netherlands) Antal van der Duim; 7–5, 3–6, [10–7]	(Switzerland) Luca Margaroli (Serbia) Ilija Vučić	(Egypt) Karim-Mohamed Maamoun (United States) Nicolas Meister	(Russia) Yan Sabanin (Uganda) Duncan Mugabe (Netherlands) Antal van der Duim (Spain) David Pérez Sanz
April 25	Greece F6 Futures; Heraklion, Greece; Hard $10,000; Singles and doubles draws	(Latvia) Miķelis Lībietis; 6–4, 6–2	(Belgium) Julien Dubail	(United States) Michael Grant (Greece) Stefanos Tsitsipas	(Israel) Edan Leshem (United States) Raymond Sarmiento (Australia) Bradley Mousley (Germany) Mats Moraing
April 25	Greece F6 Futures; Heraklion, Greece; Hard $10,000; Singles and doubles draws	(Greece) Konstantinos Economidis (Greece) Stefanos Tsitsipas; 7–6^{(7–5)}, 6–7^{(6–8)}, [13–11]	(United States) Christopher Ephron (Brazil) Bruno Savi	(United States) Michael Grant (Greece) Stefanos Tsitsipas	(Israel) Edan Leshem (United States) Raymond Sarmiento (Australia) Bradley Mousley (Germany) Mats Moraing
April 25	Hungary F2 Futures; Szeged, Hungary; Clay $10,000; Singles and doubles draws	(Belgium) Germain Gigounon; 6–4, 6–3	(Poland) Kamil Majchrzak	(Slovenia) Tomislav Ternar (Austria) Lucas Miedler	(Croatia) Filip Veger (Hungary) Viktor Filipenkó (Serbia) Dejan Katić (Romania) Nicolae Frunză
April 25	Hungary F2 Futures; Szeged, Hungary; Clay $10,000; Singles and doubles draws	(Romania) Vasile Antonescu (Romania) Alexandru Jecan; 6–3, 6–4	(Hungary) Gergely Kisgyörgy (Hungary) Dávid Szintai	(Slovenia) Tomislav Ternar (Austria) Lucas Miedler	(Croatia) Filip Veger (Hungary) Viktor Filipenkó (Serbia) Dejan Katić (Romania) Nicolae Frunză
April 25	India F1 Futures; Chandigarh, India; Hard $10,000; Singles and doubles draws	(India) Vishnu Vardhan; 6–3, 3–6, 6–1	(Indonesia) David Agung Susanto	(Japan) Yuichi Ito (Japan) Sho Katayama	(India) Sasikumar Mukund (India) Niki Kaliyanda Poonacha (India) Sriram Balaji (India) Ranjeet Virali-Murugesan
April 25	India F1 Futures; Chandigarh, India; Hard $10,000; Singles and doubles draws	(India) Sriram Balaji (India) Vishnu Vardhan; 6–1, 6–4	(Japan) Yuichi Ito (Japan) Sho Katayama	(Japan) Yuichi Ito (Japan) Sho Katayama	(India) Sasikumar Mukund (India) Niki Kaliyanda Poonacha (India) Sriram Balaji (India) Ranjeet Virali-Murugesan
April 25	Italy F8 Futures; Pula, Italy; Clay $10,000; Singles and doubles draws	(Germany) Yannick Maden; 3–6, 6–3, 6–0	(Italy) Francisco Bahamonde	(Ukraine) Vadim Alekseenko (Italy) Gianluca Mager	(France) Laurent Lokoli (Italy) Nicola Ghedin (Argentina) Franco Agamenone (Germany) Daniel Altmaier
April 25	Italy F8 Futures; Pula, Italy; Clay $10,000; Singles and doubles draws	(Italy) Francisco Bahamonde (Italy) Andrea Pellegrino; 6–4, 6–4	(France) Samuel Bensoussan (Norway) Viktor Durasovic	(Ukraine) Vadim Alekseenko (Italy) Gianluca Mager	(France) Laurent Lokoli (Italy) Nicola Ghedin (Argentina) Franco Agamenone (Germany) Daniel Altmaier
April 25	Spain F11 Futures; Móstoles, Spain; Hard $10,000; Singles and doubles draws	(France) Antoine Escoffier; 6–4, 6–7^{(5–7)}, 6–3	(Japan) Akira Santillan	(Spain) David Vega Hernández (Spain) Ricardo Ojeda Lara	(Spain) José Francisco Vidal Azorín (Spain) Andrés Artuñedo (Spain) Bernabé Zapata Miralles (France) Hugo Voljacques
April 25	Spain F11 Futures; Móstoles, Spain; Hard $10,000; Singles and doubles draws	(Spain) Andrés Artuñedo (Spain) Ricardo Ojeda Lara; 6–4, 5–7, [10–4]	(France) Élie Rousset (France) Joan Soler	(Spain) David Vega Hernández (Spain) Ricardo Ojeda Lara	(Spain) José Francisco Vidal Azorín (Spain) Andrés Artuñedo (Spain) Bernabé Zapata Miralles (France) Hugo Voljacques
April 25	Tunisia F16 Futures; Hammamet, Tunisia; Clay $10,000; Singles and doubles draws	(Belgium) Omar Salman; 2–6, 7–5, ret.	(Spain) Pedro Martínez	(Belgium) Clément Geens (Chile) Cristóbal Saavedra	(Netherlands) Lennert van der Linden (France) Gianni Mina (Italy) Pietro Rondoni (Ukraine) Filipp Kekercheni
April 25	Tunisia F16 Futures; Hammamet, Tunisia; Clay $10,000; Singles and doubles draws	(United States) Cătălin-Ionuț Gârd (Germany) Andreas Mies; 7–6^{(7–3)}, 7–6^{(7–1)}	(Spain) Carlos Calderón-Rodríguez (Spain) Pedro Martínez	(Belgium) Clément Geens (Chile) Cristóbal Saavedra	(Netherlands) Lennert van der Linden (France) Gianni Mina (Italy) Pietro Rondoni (Ukraine) Filipp Kekercheni
April 25	Turkey F17 Futures; Antalya, Turkey; Hard $10,000; Singles and doubles draws	(Germany) Marc Sieber; 6–3, 6–0	(Belgium) Christopher Heyman	(Japan) Ryota Kishi (Switzerland) Raphael Baltensperger	(Italy) Alessandro Bega (France) Rémi Boutillier (United Kingdom) Richard Gabb (Netherlands) Miliaan Niesten
April 25	Turkey F17 Futures; Antalya, Turkey; Hard $10,000; Singles and doubles draws	(Germany) Christoph Negritu (Germany) Marc Sieber; 6–4, 6–7^{(1–7)}, [12–10]	(Italy) Alessandro Bega (Italy) Lorenzo Frigerio	(Japan) Ryota Kishi (Switzerland) Raphael Baltensperger	(Italy) Alessandro Bega (France) Rémi Boutillier (United Kingdom) Richard Gabb (Netherlands) Miliaan Niesten
April 25	United States F15 Futures; Vero Beach, USA; Clay $10,000; Singles and doubles draws	(Germany) Jonas Lütjen; 7–6^{(7–4)}, 6–3	(Latvia) Mārtiņš Podžus	(United States) Vasil Kirkov (Canada) Denis Shapovalov	(Chile) Marcelo Tomás Barrios Vera (Ecuador) Roberto Quiroz (Colombia) Juan Manuel Benítez Chavarriaga (United States) Deiton Baughman
April 25	United States F15 Futures; Vero Beach, USA; Clay $10,000; Singles and doubles draws	(Serbia) Miomir Kecmanović (Germany) Jonas Lütjen; 6–1, 5–7, [10–8]	(United States) Deiton Baughman (United States) Anderson Reed	(United States) Vasil Kirkov (Canada) Denis Shapovalov	(Chile) Marcelo Tomás Barrios Vera (Ecuador) Roberto Quiroz (Colombia) Juan Manuel Benítez Chavarriaga (United States) Deiton Baughman

=== May ===
Week of	Tournament	Winner	Runners-up	Semifinalists	Quarterfinalists
May 2	Nigeria F3 Futures; Abuja, Nigeria; Hard $25,000; Singles and doubles draws	(Netherlands) Antal van der Duim; 6–4, 6–2	(Serbia) Ilija Vučić	(Spain) David Pérez Sanz (Egypt) Mohamed Safwat	(South Africa) Nicolaas Scholtz (Egypt) Karim-Mohamed Maamoun (Netherlands) David Pel (United States) Nicolas Meister
May 2	Nigeria F3 Futures; Abuja, Nigeria; Hard $25,000; Singles and doubles draws	(United States) Nicolas Meister (Spain) David Pérez Sanz; 3–6, 7–6^{(7–2)}, [11–9]	(Netherlands) David Pel (Netherlands) Antal van der Duim	(Spain) David Pérez Sanz (Egypt) Mohamed Safwat	(South Africa) Nicolaas Scholtz (Egypt) Karim-Mohamed Maamoun (Netherlands) David Pel (United States) Nicolas Meister
May 2	Argentina F5 Futures; Villa María, Argentina; Clay $10,000; Singles and doubles draws	(Argentina) Juan Ignacio Galarza; 7–6^{(7–3)}, 7–5	(Brazil) João Pedro Sorgi	(Argentina) Federico Coria (Argentina) Gabriel Alejandro Hidalgo	(Chile) Juan Carlos Sáez (Argentina) Mariano Kestelboim (Brazil) Nicolas Santos (Argentina) Juan Pablo Ficovich
May 2	Argentina F5 Futures; Villa María, Argentina; Clay $10,000; Singles and doubles draws	(Brazil) João Pedro Sorgi (Brazil) Marcelo Zormann; 6–2, 3–6, [10–2]	(Argentina) Mariano Kestelboim (Argentina) Matías Zukas	(Argentina) Federico Coria (Argentina) Gabriel Alejandro Hidalgo	(Chile) Juan Carlos Sáez (Argentina) Mariano Kestelboim (Brazil) Nicolas Santos (Argentina) Juan Pablo Ficovich
May 2	Croatia F5 Futures; Bol, Croatia; Clay $10,000; Singles and doubles draws	(Italy) Riccardo Bellotti; 6–4, 7–5	(Croatia) Kristijan Mesaroš	(Australia) Christopher O'Connell (Australia) Omar Jasika	(United Kingdom) Neil Pauffley (Croatia) Duje Kekez (Australia) Daniel Nolan (Australia) Bradley Mousley
May 2	Croatia F5 Futures; Bol, Croatia; Clay $10,000; Singles and doubles draws	(Australia) Omar Jasika (Australia) Bradley Mousley; 7–5, 7–6^{(7–5)}	(Netherlands) Tallon Griekspoor (Germany) Tobias Simon	(Australia) Christopher O'Connell (Australia) Omar Jasika	(United Kingdom) Neil Pauffley (Croatia) Duje Kekez (Australia) Daniel Nolan (Australia) Bradley Mousley
May 2	Hungary F3 Futures; Szeged, Hungary; Clay $10,000; Singles and doubles draws	(Belgium) Germain Gigounon; 6–1, 6–0	(Czech Republic) Zdeněk Kolář	(Canada) Frank Dancevic (Czech Republic) Ondřej Krstev	(Austria) Lucas Miedler (Czech Republic) Vít Kopřiva (Hungary) Viktor Filipenkó (Hungary) Máté Valkusz
May 2	Hungary F3 Futures; Szeged, Hungary; Clay $10,000; Singles and doubles draws	(Hungary) Gábor Borsos (Hungary) Ádám Kellner; 6–2, 6–1	(Romania) Victor Vlad Cornea (Czech Republic) Zdeněk Kolář	(Canada) Frank Dancevic (Czech Republic) Ondřej Krstev	(Austria) Lucas Miedler (Czech Republic) Vít Kopřiva (Hungary) Viktor Filipenkó (Hungary) Máté Valkusz
May 2	India F2 Futures; Jassowal, India; Hard $10,000; Singles and doubles draws	(Japan) Shintaro Imai; 6–4, 6–4	(India) Sidharth Rawat	(Japan) Sho Katayama (Japan) Yuya Ito	(Indonesia) David Agung Susanto (India) Sasikumar Mukund (India) Sriram Balaji (Indonesia) Christopher Rungkat
May 2	India F2 Futures; Jassowal, India; Hard $10,000; Singles and doubles draws	(Japan) Yuichi Ito (Japan) Sho Katayama; 7–5, 7–5	(India) Mohit Mayur Jayaprakash (India) Vinayak Sharma Kaza	(Japan) Sho Katayama (Japan) Yuya Ito	(Indonesia) David Agung Susanto (India) Sasikumar Mukund (India) Sriram Balaji (Indonesia) Christopher Rungkat
May 2	Italy F9 Futures; Pula, Italia; Clay $10,000; Singles and doubles draws	(Italy) Erik Crepaldi; 1–0, ret.	(France) Yannick Jankovits	(Italy) Gianmarco Moroni (Norway) Casper Ruud	(United States) Gonzales Austin (Italy) Lorenzo Frigerio (Italy) Claudio Fortuna (France) Samuel Bensoussan
May 2	Italy F9 Futures; Pula, Italia; Clay $10,000; Singles and doubles draws	(Italy) Erik Crepaldi (France) Yannick Jankovits; 6–2, 6–3	(Italy) Claudio Fortuna (Italy) Riccardo Sinicropi	(Italy) Gianmarco Moroni (Norway) Casper Ruud	(United States) Gonzales Austin (Italy) Lorenzo Frigerio (Italy) Claudio Fortuna (France) Samuel Bensoussan
May 2	Mexico F1 Futures; Córdoba, Mexico; Hard $10,000; Singles and doubles draws	(Barbados) Darian King; 6–1, 6–2	(United States) Adam El Mihdawy	(Mexico) Manuel Sánchez (Canada) Alejandro Tabilo	(Chile) Marcelo Tomás Barrios Vera (United States) Andrew Carter (United Kingdom) Luke Bambridge (Ecuador) Iván Endara
May 2	Mexico F1 Futures; Córdoba, Mexico; Hard $10,000; Singles and doubles draws	(United Kingdom) Luke Bambridge (United Kingdom) Farris Fathi Gosea; 7–6^{(7–3)}, 7–6^{(7–2)}	(Mexico) Mauricio Astorga (Mexico) Manuel Sánchez	(Mexico) Manuel Sánchez (Canada) Alejandro Tabilo	(Chile) Marcelo Tomás Barrios Vera (United States) Andrew Carter (United Kingdom) Luke Bambridge (Ecuador) Iván Endara
May 2	Portugal F4 Futures; Caldas da Rainha, Portugal; Clay $10,000; Singles and doubles draws	(Brazil) Bruno Sant'Anna; 7–6^{(7–3)}, 6–2	(Portugal) João Domingues	(Portugal) Frederico Gil (Spain) Ricardo Ojeda Lara	(France) Corentin Denolly (Belgium) Victor Poncelet (Spain) Borja Rodríguez Manzano (Brazil) Guilherme Wojciechowski Osório
May 2	Portugal F4 Futures; Caldas da Rainha, Portugal; Clay $10,000; Singles and doubles draws	Cancelled		(Portugal) Frederico Gil (Spain) Ricardo Ojeda Lara	(France) Corentin Denolly (Belgium) Victor Poncelet (Spain) Borja Rodríguez Manzano (Brazil) Guilherme Wojciechowski Osório
May 2	Romania F1 Futures; Galați, Romania; Clay $10,000; Singles and doubles draws	(Uruguay) Martín Cuevas; 6–4, 6–3	(Bulgaria) Alexander Lazov	(Romania) Teodor-Dacian Crăciun (Romania) Dragoș Dima	(Romania) George Botezan (Romania) Petru-Alexandru Luncanu (Argentina) Juan Pablo Paz (Lithuania) Laurynas Grigelis
May 2	Romania F1 Futures; Galați, Romania; Clay $10,000; Singles and doubles draws	(Romania) Andrei Ștefan Apostol (Romania) Nicolae Frunză; 6–4, 6–4	(Romania) Victor-Mugurel Anagnastopol (Bulgaria) Alexander Lazov	(Romania) Teodor-Dacian Crăciun (Romania) Dragoș Dima	(Romania) George Botezan (Romania) Petru-Alexandru Luncanu (Argentina) Juan Pablo Paz (Lithuania) Laurynas Grigelis
May 2	Spain F12 Futures; Lleida, Spain; Clay $10,000; Singles and doubles draws	(India) Ramkumar Ramanathan; 7–6^{(7–1)}, 6–2	(Canada) Félix Auger-Aliassime	(Spain) Carlos Taberner (Spain) Mario Vilella Martínez	(Spain) David Jordà Sanchis (Chile) Bastián Malla (Germany) Jean-Marc Werner (Spain) Jaume Pla Malfeito
May 2	Spain F12 Futures; Lleida, Spain; Clay $10,000; Singles and doubles draws	(India) Ramkumar Ramanathan (Spain) David Vega Hernández; 6–3, 6–1	(Spain) Carlos Boluda-Purkiss (Australia) Alex De Minaur	(Spain) Carlos Taberner (Spain) Mario Vilella Martínez	(Spain) David Jordà Sanchis (Chile) Bastián Malla (Germany) Jean-Marc Werner (Spain) Jaume Pla Malfeito
May 2	Sweden F1 Futures; Karlskrona, Sweden; Clay $10,000; Singles and doubles draws	(Sweden) Carl Söderlund; 6–1, 6–2	(Japan) Kaichi Uchida	(Sweden) Fred Simonsson (Sweden) Isak Arvidsson	(Poland) Piotr Zbroja (Sweden) Dragoș Nicolae Mădăraș (Estonia) Kenneth Raisma (Sweden) Daniel Appelgren
May 2	Sweden F1 Futures; Karlskrona, Sweden; Clay $10,000; Singles and doubles draws	(Sweden) Isak Arvidsson (Sweden) Fred Simonsson; Walkover	(Netherlands) Marc Dijkhuizen (Netherlands) Colin van Beem	(Sweden) Fred Simonsson (Sweden) Isak Arvidsson	(Poland) Piotr Zbroja (Sweden) Dragoș Nicolae Mădăraș (Estonia) Kenneth Raisma (Sweden) Daniel Appelgren
May 2	Tunisia F17 Futures; Hammamet, Tunisia; Clay $10,000; Singles and doubles draws	(Spain) Oriol Roca Batalla; 6–3, 6–4	(Portugal) Pedro Sousa	(Egypt) Karim Hossam (Russia) Alexander Zhurbin	(Chile) Cristóbal Saavedra (Italy) Alessandro Luisi (France) Jonathan Kanar (Belgium) Stijn Meulemans
May 2	Tunisia F17 Futures; Hammamet, Tunisia; Clay $10,000; Singles and doubles draws	(Tunisia) Anis Ghorbel (Spain) Oriol Roca Batalla; 6–1, 6–2	(Uruguay) Marcel Felder (Uruguay) Nicolás Xiviller	(Egypt) Karim Hossam (Russia) Alexander Zhurbin	(Chile) Cristóbal Saavedra (Italy) Alessandro Luisi (France) Jonathan Kanar (Belgium) Stijn Meulemans
May 2	Turkey F18 Futures; Antalya, Turkey; Hard $10,000; Singles and doubles draws	(Austria) Dennis Novak; 6–2, 6–2	(Germany) Marc Sieber	(Turkey) Anıl Yüksel (France) Hugo Nys	(Austria) Thomas Statzberger (France) Rémi Boutillier (Japan) Katsuki Nagao (Japan) Issei Okamura
May 2	Turkey F18 Futures; Antalya, Turkey; Hard $10,000; Singles and doubles draws	(Latvia) Miķelis Lībietis (France) Hugo Nys; 6–2, 6–2	(Turkey) Sarp Ağabigün (Turkey) Altuğ Çelikbilek	(Turkey) Anıl Yüksel (France) Hugo Nys	(Austria) Thomas Statzberger (France) Rémi Boutillier (Japan) Katsuki Nagao (Japan) Issei Okamura
May 2	USA F16 Futures; Tampa, United States; Clay $10,000; Singles and doubles draws	(Canada) Peter Polansky; 7–5, 6–3	(Ecuador) Roberto Quiroz	(Canada) Philip Bester (New Zealand) Jose Statham	(Australia) Blake Mott (Serbia) Miomir Kecmanović (Germany) Jonas Lütjen (United States) Sekou Bangoura
May 2	USA F16 Futures; Tampa, United States; Clay $10,000; Singles and doubles draws	(Ecuador) Gonzalo Escobar (Ecuador) Roberto Quiroz; 6–4, 7–6^{(7–4)}	(Serbia) Miomir Kecmanović (Germany) Jonas Lütjen	(Canada) Philip Bester (New Zealand) Jose Statham	(Australia) Blake Mott (Serbia) Miomir Kecmanović (Germany) Jonas Lütjen (United States) Sekou Bangoura
May 9	Nigeria F4 Futures; Abuja, Nigeria; Hard $25,000; Singles and doubles draws	(Spain) David Pérez Sanz; 7–6^{(7–3)}, 6–4	(Egypt) Mohamed Safwat	(South Africa) Nicolaas Scholtz (Egypt) Karim-Mohamed Maamoun	(Austria) Lenny Hampel (South Africa) Tucker Vorster (United States) Nicolas Meister (Zimbabwe) Takanyi Garanganga
May 9	Nigeria F4 Futures; Abuja, Nigeria; Hard $25,000; Singles and doubles draws	(Egypt) Karim-Mohamed Maamoun (Serbia) Ilija Vučić; 6–4, 6–4,	(Austria) Lenny Hampel (Australia) Darren Polkinghorne	(South Africa) Nicolaas Scholtz (Egypt) Karim-Mohamed Maamoun	(Austria) Lenny Hampel (South Africa) Tucker Vorster (United States) Nicolas Meister (Zimbabwe) Takanyi Garanganga
May 9	Algeria F1 Futures; Oran, Algeria; Clay $10,000; Singles and doubles draws	(France) Sadio Doumbia; 4–6, 6–4, 6–4	(France) Alexandre Müller	(Spain) Mario Vilella Martínez (France) Fabien Reboul	(France) Baptiste Crepatte (Brazil) Rafael Camilo (Spain) Aaron Cortes Alcaraz (Spain) Pol Toledo Bagué
May 9	Algeria F1 Futures; Oran, Algeria; Clay $10,000; Singles and doubles draws	(France) Alexandre Müller (France) Fabien Reboul; 6–4, 6–4	(Spain) Adria Mas Mascolo (Spain) Pol Toledo Bagué	(Spain) Mario Vilella Martínez (France) Fabien Reboul	(France) Baptiste Crepatte (Brazil) Rafael Camilo (Spain) Aaron Cortes Alcaraz (Spain) Pol Toledo Bagué
May 9	Argentina F6 Futures; Villa del Dique, Argentina; Clay $10,000; Singles and doubles draws	(Brazil) Marcelo Zormann; 6–4, 7–6^{(7–5)}	(Argentina) Federico Coria	(Brazil) João Pedro Sorgi (Brazil) Daniel Dutra da Silva	(Argentina) Hernán Casanova (Chile) Juan Carlos Sáez (Argentina) Juan Ignacio Galarza (Argentina) Matías Franco Descotte
May 9	Argentina F6 Futures; Villa del Dique, Argentina; Clay $10,000; Singles and doubles draws	(Brazil) João Pedro Sorgi (Brazil) Marcelo Zormann; 6–2, 6–3	(Brazil) Oscar José Gutierrez (Argentina) Gabriel Alejandro Hidalgo	(Brazil) João Pedro Sorgi (Brazil) Daniel Dutra da Silva	(Argentina) Hernán Casanova (Chile) Juan Carlos Sáez (Argentina) Juan Ignacio Galarza (Argentina) Matías Franco Descotte
May 9	Bosnia & Herzegovina F1 Futures; Doboj, Bosnia & Herzegovina; Clay $10,000; Singles and doubles draws	(Croatia) Kristijan Mesaroš; 6–1, 6–1	(Croatia) Nino Serdarušić	(North Macedonia) Tomislav Jotovski (Ukraine) Danylo Kalenichenko	(Austria) David Pichler (Serbia) Luka Ilić (Bosnia and Herzegovina) Nerman Fatić (Serbia) Dejan Katić
May 9	Bosnia & Herzegovina F1 Futures; Doboj, Bosnia & Herzegovina; Clay $10,000; Singles and doubles draws	(Romania) Victor Vlad Cornea (Croatia) Nino Serdarušić; 6–0, 2–6, [10–8]	(Ukraine) Danylo Kalenichenko (Austria) David Pichler	(North Macedonia) Tomislav Jotovski (Ukraine) Danylo Kalenichenko	(Austria) David Pichler (Serbia) Luka Ilić (Bosnia and Herzegovina) Nerman Fatić (Serbia) Dejan Katić
May 9	China F6 Futures; Wuhan, China, P.R. Hard $10,000; Singles and doubles draws	(Australia) James Duckworth; 6–3, 6–2	(Japan) Yusuke Takahashi	(United States) Raymond Sarmiento (Belgium) Michael Geerts	(China) Te Rigele (Japan) Makoto Ochi (Japan) Renta Tokuda (United States) Evan King
May 9	China F6 Futures; Wuhan, China, P.R. Hard $10,000; Singles and doubles draws	(Latvia) Artūrs Lazdiņš (Chinese Taipei) Yu Cheng-yu; 6–3, 6–4	(Japan) Arata Onozawa (Japan) Masato Shiga	(United States) Raymond Sarmiento (Belgium) Michael Geerts	(China) Te Rigele (Japan) Makoto Ochi (Japan) Renta Tokuda (United States) Evan King
May 9	Croatia F6 Futures; Bol, Croatia; Clay $10,000; Singles and doubles draws	(Serbia) Nikola Čačić; 7–5, 6–4	(Hungary) Péter Nagy	(Australia) Omar Jasika (Australia) Christopher O'Connell	(Slovenia) Tomislav Ternar (Australia) Bradley Mousley (France) Corentin Moutet (Germany) Tobias Simon
May 9	Croatia F6 Futures; Bol, Croatia; Clay $10,000; Singles and doubles draws	(Croatia) Tomislav Draganja (Croatia) Franjo Raspudić; 7–6^{(7–3)}, 6–4	(Germany) Florian Fallert (Germany) Paul Wörner	(Australia) Omar Jasika (Australia) Christopher O'Connell	(Slovenia) Tomislav Ternar (Australia) Bradley Mousley (France) Corentin Moutet (Germany) Tobias Simon
May 9	Czech Republic F1 Futures; Most, Czech Republic; Clay $10,000; Singles and doubles draws	(Czech Republic) Jan Šátral; 6–3, 6–3	(Belgium) Clément Geens	(Czech Republic) Zdeněk Kolář (Czech Republic) Jan Mertl	(Czech Republic) Libor Salaba (Netherlands) Lennert van der Linden (Czech Republic) Vít Kopřiva (Czech Republic) Tomáš Papík
May 9	Czech Republic F1 Futures; Most, Czech Republic; Clay $10,000; Singles and doubles draws	(Australia) Steven de Waard (Germany) Andreas Mies; 5–7, 7–5, [10–7]	(Czech Republic) Roman Jebavý (Czech Republic) Libor Salaba	(Czech Republic) Zdeněk Kolář (Czech Republic) Jan Mertl	(Czech Republic) Libor Salaba (Netherlands) Lennert van der Linden (Czech Republic) Vít Kopřiva (Czech Republic) Tomáš Papík
May 9	India F3 Futures; Jassowal, India; Hard $10,000; Singles and doubles draws	(India) Vishnu Vardhan; 7–6^{(7–4)}, 6–4	(India) Dalwinder Singh	(Japan) Shintaro Imai (India) Vijayant Malik	(Vietnam) Lý Hoàng Nam (India) Jayesh Pungliya (Japan) Yuya Ito (India) Vijay Sundar Prashanth
May 9	India F3 Futures; Jassowal, India; Hard $10,000; Singles and doubles draws	(India) Sriram Balaji (India) Vijay Sundar Prashanth; 6–3, 6–3	(United States) John Lamble (Portugal) Bernardo Saraiva	(Japan) Shintaro Imai (India) Vijayant Malik	(Vietnam) Lý Hoàng Nam (India) Jayesh Pungliya (Japan) Yuya Ito (India) Vijay Sundar Prashanth
May 9	Italy F10 Futures; Pula, Italia; Clay $10,000; Singles and doubles draws	(Greece) Stefanos Tsitsipas; 6–3, 6–7^{(2–7)}, 7–6^{(7–2)}	(Norway) Casper Ruud	(Italy) Andrea Pellegrino (Italy) Cristian Carli	(France) Samuel Bensoussan (United Kingdom) Jay Clarke (United States) Ulises Blanch (France) Enzo Couacaud
May 9	Italy F10 Futures; Pula, Italia; Clay $10,000; Singles and doubles draws	(Argentina) Franco Agamenone (Argentina) Mateo Nicolás Martínez; 6–2, 6–2	(Greece) Petros Tsitsipas (Greece) Stefanos Tsitsipas	(Italy) Andrea Pellegrino (Italy) Cristian Carli	(France) Samuel Bensoussan (United Kingdom) Jay Clarke (United States) Ulises Blanch (France) Enzo Couacaud
May 9	Mexico F2 Futures; Pachuca, Mexico; Hard $10,000; Singles and doubles draws	(Chile) Marcelo Tomás Barrios Vera; 6–1, 7–6^{(7–3)}	(Barbados) Darian King	(United States) Raleigh Smith (United States) Adam El Mihdawy	(Mexico) Manuel Sánchez (Ecuador) Iván Endara (Mexico) Luis Patiño (Colombia) Juan Manuel Benítez Chavarriaga
May 9	Mexico F2 Futures; Pachuca, Mexico; Hard $10,000; Singles and doubles draws	(Philippines) Ruben Gonzales (Barbados) Darian King; 6–7^{(2–7)}, 7–6^{(7–3)}, [10–4]	(Colombia) José Daniel Bendeck (Mexico) Alejandro Moreno Figueroa	(United States) Raleigh Smith (United States) Adam El Mihdawy	(Mexico) Manuel Sánchez (Ecuador) Iván Endara (Mexico) Luis Patiño (Colombia) Juan Manuel Benítez Chavarriaga
May 9	Portugal F5 Futures; Lisbon, Portugal; Hard $10,000; Singles and doubles draws	(Spain) Pablo Vivero González; 6–3, 6–1	(Portugal) André Gaspar Murta	(Belgium) Julien Dubail (France) Mick Lescure	(United States) Michael Grant (France) Yanaïs Laurent (Portugal) Romain Barbosa (France) Sébastien Boltz
May 9	Portugal F5 Futures; Lisbon, Portugal; Hard $10,000; Singles and doubles draws	(Portugal) Nuno Deus (Portugal) João Domingues; 4–6, 7–5, [10–7]	(United Kingdom) Scott Clayton (United Kingdom) Jonny O'Mara	(Belgium) Julien Dubail (France) Mick Lescure	(United States) Michael Grant (France) Yanaïs Laurent (Portugal) Romain Barbosa (France) Sébastien Boltz
May 9	Romania F2 Futures; Galați, Romania; Clay $10,000; Singles and doubles draws	(Argentina) Juan Pablo Paz; 6–4, 6–1	(Lithuania) Laurynas Grigelis	(Argentina) Juan Ignacio Londero (Romania) Petru-Alexandru Luncanu	(Bulgaria) Alexander Lazov (Mexico) Lucas Gómez (Romania) Alexandru Jecan (Uruguay) Martín Cuevas
May 9	Romania F2 Futures; Galați, Romania; Clay $10,000; Singles and doubles draws	(Mexico) Lucas Gómez (Argentina) Juan Pablo Paz; 6–4, 4–6, [11–9]	(Lithuania) Laurynas Grigelis (Lithuania) Lukas Mugevičius	(Argentina) Juan Ignacio Londero (Romania) Petru-Alexandru Luncanu	(Bulgaria) Alexander Lazov (Mexico) Lucas Gómez (Romania) Alexandru Jecan (Uruguay) Martín Cuevas
May 9	Spain F13 Futures; Valldoreix, Spain; Clay $10,000; Singles and doubles draws	(Spain) Albert Alcaraz Ivorra; 6–2, 6–3	(Spain) Carlos Taberner	(France) Maxime Chazal (Spain) Jaume Pla Malfeito	(Spain) Jaume Munar (Germany) Jean-Marc Werner (Spain) Juan Lizariturry (Japan) Ryota Tanuma
May 9	Spain F13 Futures; Valldoreix, Spain; Clay $10,000; Singles and doubles draws	(Spain) Álvaro López San Martín (Spain) Jaume Munar; 6–3, 3–6, [10–5]	(Spain) Carlos Calderón-Rodríguez (Spain) Pedro Martínez	(France) Maxime Chazal (Spain) Jaume Pla Malfeito	(Spain) Jaume Munar (Germany) Jean-Marc Werner (Spain) Juan Lizariturry (Japan) Ryota Tanuma
May 9	Sweden F2 Futures; Båstad, Sweden; Clay $10,000; Singles and doubles draws	(Belgium) Julien Cagnina; 6–4, 3–6, 6–2	(Japan) Kaichi Uchida	(Sweden) Dragoș Nicolae Mădăraș (Sweden) Markus Eriksson	(Sweden) Carl Söderlund (France) Maxime Tabatruong (Sweden) Lucas Renard (Sweden) Isak Arvidsson
May 9	Sweden F2 Futures; Båstad, Sweden; Clay $10,000; Singles and doubles draws	(Sweden) Markus Eriksson (Sweden) Milos Sekulic; 6–2, 6–3	(Belgium) Julien Cagnina (Belgium) Omar Salman	(Sweden) Dragoș Nicolae Mădăraș (Sweden) Markus Eriksson	(Sweden) Carl Söderlund (France) Maxime Tabatruong (Sweden) Lucas Renard (Sweden) Isak Arvidsson
May 9	Tunisia F18 Futures; Hammamet, Tunisia; Clay $10,000; Singles and doubles draws	(Portugal) Pedro Sousa; 6–3, 6–1	(Spain) Oriol Roca Batalla	(France) Benjamin Bonzi (Italy) Roberto Marcora	(United Kingdom) Daniel Dowson (Chile) Cristóbal Saavedra (France) Thibault Venturino (Spain) Miguel Semmler
May 9	Tunisia F18 Futures; Hammamet, Tunisia; Clay $10,000; Singles and doubles draws	(France) Benjamin Bonzi (Tunisia) Anis Ghorbel; 6–3, 7–6^{(8–6)}	(Spain) Sergio Martos Gornés (Spain) Oriol Roca Batalla	(France) Benjamin Bonzi (Italy) Roberto Marcora	(United Kingdom) Daniel Dowson (Chile) Cristóbal Saavedra (France) Thibault Venturino (Spain) Miguel Semmler
May 9	Turkey F19 Futures; Antalya, Turkey; Hard $10,000; Singles and doubles draws	(Austria) Dennis Novak; 6–1, 6–3	(Turkey) Anıl Yüksel	(Germany) Marc Sieber (France) Hugo Nys	(Turkey) Muhammet Haylaz (Japan) Hiromasa Oku (Japan) Keisuke Numajiri (France) Florent Diep
May 9	Turkey F19 Futures; Antalya, Turkey; Hard $10,000; Singles and doubles draws	(Latvia) Miķelis Lībietis (France) Hugo Nys; 4–6, 6–2, [10–3]	(Japan) Katsuki Nagao (Japan) Hiromasa Oku	(Germany) Marc Sieber (France) Hugo Nys	(Turkey) Muhammet Haylaz (Japan) Hiromasa Oku (Japan) Keisuke Numajiri (France) Florent Diep
May 9	Ukraine F1 Futures; Cherkasy, Ukraine; Clay $10,000; Singles and doubles draws	(Belgium) Sander Gillé; 6–4, 3–6, 6–4	(Ukraine) Vladyslav Manafov	(Switzerland) Antoine Bellier (Ukraine) Oleg Prihodko	(France) Thomas Bréchemier (Belgium) Joran Vliegen (Ukraine) Vitalii Shcherba (Ukraine) Vadim Alekseenko
May 9	Ukraine F1 Futures; Cherkasy, Ukraine; Clay $10,000; Singles and doubles draws	(Belgium) Sander Gillé (Belgium) Joran Vliegen; 6–3, 4–6, [11–9]	(Switzerland) Antoine Bellier (Ukraine) Vladyslav Manafov	(Switzerland) Antoine Bellier (Ukraine) Oleg Prihodko	(France) Thomas Bréchemier (Belgium) Joran Vliegen (Ukraine) Vitalii Shcherba (Ukraine) Vadim Alekseenko
May 16	China F7 Futures; Wuhan, China, P.R. Hard $25,000; Singles and doubles draws	(Japan) Akira Santillan; 6–1, 6–4	(South Korea) Chung Yun-seong	(South Korea) Kwon Soon-woo (Belgium) Michael Geerts	(Japan) Shuichi Sekiguchi (New Zealand) Finn Tearney (China) Wang Chuhan (United States) Evan King
May 16	China F7 Futures; Wuhan, China, P.R. Hard $25,000; Singles and doubles draws	(Australia) Harry Bourchier (Japan) Akira Santillan; 4–6, 6–2, [10–7]	(China) He Yecong (China) Wang Aoxiong	(South Korea) Kwon Soon-woo (Belgium) Michael Geerts	(Japan) Shuichi Sekiguchi (New Zealand) Finn Tearney (China) Wang Chuhan (United States) Evan King
May 16	Algeria F2 Futures; Algiers, Algeria; Clay $10,000; Singles and doubles draws	(Spain) Mario Vilella Martínez; 6–4, 6–2	(France) Grégoire Jacq	(France) Sadio Doumbia (France) Fabien Reboul	(France) Alexandre Müller (Venezuela) Jordi Muñoz Abreu (France) Ronan Joncour (Spain) Pol Toledo Bagué
May 16	Algeria F2 Futures; Algiers, Algeria; Clay $10,000; Singles and doubles draws	(France) Grégoire Jacq (France) Alexandre Müller; 6–4, 6–3	(Venezuela) Jordi Muñoz Abreu (France) Fabien Reboul	(France) Sadio Doumbia (France) Fabien Reboul	(France) Alexandre Müller (Venezuela) Jordi Muñoz Abreu (France) Ronan Joncour (Spain) Pol Toledo Bagué
May 16	Argentina F7 Futures; Córdoba, Argentina; Clay $10,000; Singles and doubles draws	(Argentina) Hernán Casanova; 4–6, 6–4, 6–4	(Argentina) Andrea Collarini	(Argentina) Juan Ignacio Galarza (Brazil) Daniel Dutra da Silva	(Argentina) Gabriel Alejandro Hidalgo (Argentina) Federico Coria (Brazil) Marcelo Zormann (Argentina) Matías Zukas
May 16	Argentina F7 Futures; Córdoba, Argentina; Clay $10,000; Singles and doubles draws	(Brazil) João Pedro Sorgi (Brazil) Marcelo Zormann; 6–4, 3–6, [11–9]	(Chile) Guillermo Rivera-Aránguiz (Chile) Juan Carlos Sáez	(Argentina) Juan Ignacio Galarza (Brazil) Daniel Dutra da Silva	(Argentina) Gabriel Alejandro Hidalgo (Argentina) Federico Coria (Brazil) Marcelo Zormann (Argentina) Matías Zukas
May 16	Bosnia & Herzegovina F2 Futures; Brčko, Bosnia & Herzegovina; Clay $10,000; Singles and doubles draws	(Canada) Frank Dancevic; 6–4, 3–6, 6–0	(Croatia) Kristijan Mesaroš	(Serbia) Dejan Katić (Austria) David Pichler	(Croatia) Nino Serdarušić (North Macedonia) Tomislav Jotovski (Serbia) Milan Drinić (Austria) Lucas Miedler
May 16	Bosnia & Herzegovina F2 Futures; Brčko, Bosnia & Herzegovina; Clay $10,000; Singles and doubles draws	(Austria) Lucas Miedler (Austria) David Pichler; 6–2, 4–6, [10–6]	(Canada) Frank Dancevic (Serbia) Nebojša Perić	(Serbia) Dejan Katić (Austria) David Pichler	(Croatia) Nino Serdarušić (North Macedonia) Tomislav Jotovski (Serbia) Milan Drinić (Austria) Lucas Miedler
May 16	Bulgaria F1 Futures; Sozopol, Bulgaria; Clay $10,000; Singles and doubles draws	(Spain) David Pérez Sanz; 6–2, 6–3	(Bulgaria) Alexander Lazov	(Bulgaria) Alexandar Lazarov (Bulgaria) Gabriel Donev	(Russia) Yan Sabanin (Canada) Martin Beran (France) Victor Ouvrard (Bulgaria) Tihomir Grozdanov
May 16	Bulgaria F1 Futures; Sozopol, Bulgaria; Clay $10,000; Singles and doubles draws	(Russia) Alexandr Igoshin (Russia) Yan Sabanin; 2–6, 6–3, [10–6]	(Switzerland) Luca Margaroli (Spain) David Pérez Sanz	(Bulgaria) Alexandar Lazarov (Bulgaria) Gabriel Donev	(Russia) Yan Sabanin (Canada) Martin Beran (France) Victor Ouvrard (Bulgaria) Tihomir Grozdanov
May 16	Croatia F7 Futures; Bol, Croatia; Clay $10,000; Singles and doubles draws	(Italy) Riccardo Bellotti; 7–6^{(7–3)}, 6–0	(Hungary) Péter Nagy	(Australia) Christopher O'Connell (Montenegro) Ljubomir Čelebić	(Australia) Omar Jasika (Germany) Tobias Simon (Croatia) Mate Delić (Croatia) Duje Kekez
May 16	Croatia F7 Futures; Bol, Croatia; Clay $10,000; Singles and doubles draws	(Croatia) Duje Kekez (Croatia) Antun Vidak; 3–6, 6–3, [11–9]	(Croatia) Tomislav Draganja (Croatia) Franjo Raspudić	(Australia) Christopher O'Connell (Montenegro) Ljubomir Čelebić	(Australia) Omar Jasika (Germany) Tobias Simon (Croatia) Mate Delić (Croatia) Duje Kekez
May 16	Czech Republic F2 Futures; Prague, Czech Republic; Clay $10,000; Singles and doubles draws	(Czech Republic) Zdeněk Kolář; 6–3, 6–2	(Belgium) Clément Geens	(Germany) Johannes Härteis (Germany) Oscar Otte	(Czech Republic) Vít Kopřiva (Czech Republic) Petr Michnev (India) Sumit Nagal (Chile) Laslo Urrutia Fuentes
May 16	Czech Republic F2 Futures; Prague, Czech Republic; Clay $10,000; Singles and doubles draws	(Germany) Andreas Mies (Germany) Oscar Otte; 6–0, 6–4	(Czech Republic) Zdeněk Kolář (Czech Republic) Petr Michnev	(Germany) Johannes Härteis (Germany) Oscar Otte	(Czech Republic) Vít Kopřiva (Czech Republic) Petr Michnev (India) Sumit Nagal (Chile) Laslo Urrutia Fuentes
May 16	Israel F7 Futures; Ramat Gan, Israel; Hard $10,000; Singles and doubles draws	(United States) Nicolas Meister; 7–6^{(7–3)}, 7–5	(Israel) Edan Leshem	(United States) Jesse Witten (Belgium) Julien Dubail	(Israel) Dekel Bar (United States) Cameron Silverman (Czech Republic) Michal Schmid (France) Baptiste Crepatte
May 16	Israel F7 Futures; Ramat Gan, Israel; Hard $10,000; Singles and doubles draws	(United States) Nicolas Meister (United States) Hunter Reese; 7–5, 7–5	(Israel) Daniel Cukierman (Israel) Edan Leshem	(United States) Jesse Witten (Belgium) Julien Dubail	(Israel) Dekel Bar (United States) Cameron Silverman (Czech Republic) Michal Schmid (France) Baptiste Crepatte
May 16	Italy F11 Futures; Frascati, Italy; Clay $10,000; Singles and doubles draws	(Italy) Gianluca Di Nicola; 5–7, 6–3, 6–2	(Italy) Daniele Capecchi	(Italy) Francisco Bahamonde (Italy) Nicola Ghedin	(Italy) Andrea Pellegrino (Italy) Matteo Fago (Italy) Adelchi Virgili (Germany) Yannick Maden
May 16	Italy F11 Futures; Frascati, Italy; Clay $10,000; Singles and doubles draws	(Italy) Riccardo Sinicropi (Italy) Andrea Vavassori; 4–6, 6–3, [10–1]	(Turkey) Tuna Altuna (Italy) Adelchi Virgili	(Italy) Francisco Bahamonde (Italy) Nicola Ghedin	(Italy) Andrea Pellegrino (Italy) Matteo Fago (Italy) Adelchi Virgili (Germany) Yannick Maden
May 16	Mexico F3 Futures; Mexico City, Mexico; Hard $10,000; Singles and doubles draws	(United States) Adam El Mihdawy; 7–6^{(7–3)}, 6–3	(United Kingdom) Farris Fathi Gosea	(Japan) Naoki Nakagawa (Ecuador) Roberto Quiroz	(Mexico) Luis Patiño (Brazil) Ricardo Hocevar (Colombia) Juan Manuel Benítez Chavarriaga (United States) Raleigh Smith
May 16	Mexico F3 Futures; Mexico City, Mexico; Hard $10,000; Singles and doubles draws	(Ecuador) Iván Endara (Ecuador) Roberto Quiroz; Walkover	(Mexico) Hans Hach Verdugo (Mexico) Luis Patiño	(Japan) Naoki Nakagawa (Ecuador) Roberto Quiroz	(Mexico) Luis Patiño (Brazil) Ricardo Hocevar (Colombia) Juan Manuel Benítez Chavarriaga (United States) Raleigh Smith
May 16	Portugal F6 Futures; Setúbal, Portugal; Hard $10,000; Singles and doubles draws	(Portugal) João Domingues; 6–3, 6–2	(Italy) Erik Crepaldi	(Spain) Pablo Vivero Gonzalez (France) Tak Khunn Wang	(Spain) Samuel Ribeiro Navarrete (United Kingdom) Scott Clayton (Spain) Bernabé Zapata Miralles (United Kingdom) Jonny O'Mara
May 16	Portugal F6 Futures; Setúbal, Portugal; Hard $10,000; Singles and doubles draws	(Italy) Erik Crepaldi (France) Matthieu Roy; 6–1, 6–3	(Portugal) Francisco Cabral (Portugal) Felipe Cunha e Silva	(Spain) Pablo Vivero Gonzalez (France) Tak Khunn Wang	(Spain) Samuel Ribeiro Navarrete (United Kingdom) Scott Clayton (Spain) Bernabé Zapata Miralles (United Kingdom) Jonny O'Mara
May 16	Romania F3 Futures; Bucharest, Romania; Clay $10,000; Singles and doubles draws	(Romania) Dragoș Dima; 7–5, 6–3	(Romania) Teodor-Dacian Crăciun	(Romania) Victor Crivoi (Argentina) Juan Pablo Paz	(Romania) Vasile Antonescu (Romania) Bogdan Borza (Mexico) Lucas Gómez (Romania) Petru-Alexandru Luncanu
May 16	Romania F3 Futures; Bucharest, Romania; Clay $10,000; Singles and doubles draws	(Romania) Victor Crivoi (Romania) Petru-Alexandru Luncanu; 6–4, 2–6, [10–6]	(Romania) Victor-Mugurel Anagnastopol (Romania) Victor Vlad Cornea	(Romania) Victor Crivoi (Argentina) Juan Pablo Paz	(Romania) Vasile Antonescu (Romania) Bogdan Borza (Mexico) Lucas Gómez (Romania) Petru-Alexandru Luncanu
May 16	Spain F14 Futures; Vic, Spain; Clay $10,000; Singles and doubles draws	(Spain) Jaume Munar; 7–6^{(7–5)}, 7–5	(Australia) Alex De Minaur	(Spain) Albert Alcaraz Ivorra (Spain) Miguel Semmler	(Germany) Jean-Marc Werner (Spain) Carlos Boluda-Purkiss (Russia) Mikhail Korovin (Canada) Félix Auger-Aliassime
May 16	Spain F14 Futures; Vic, Spain; Clay $10,000; Singles and doubles draws	(Spain) Sergio Martos Gornés (Spain) Jaume Pla Malfeito; 6–2, 6–2	(Germany) Bogdan Djurdjevic (Argentina) Dante Gennaro	(Spain) Albert Alcaraz Ivorra (Spain) Miguel Semmler	(Germany) Jean-Marc Werner (Spain) Carlos Boluda-Purkiss (Russia) Mikhail Korovin (Canada) Félix Auger-Aliassime
May 16	Sweden F3 Futures; Båstad, Sweden; Clay $10,000; Singles and doubles draws	(Sweden) Isak Arvidsson; 6–2, 6–0	(Sweden) Fred Simonsson	(Sweden) Dragoș Nicolae Mădăraș (Japan) Kaichi Uchida	(Germany) George von Massow (Sweden) Markus Eriksson (Finland) Eero Vasa (Germany) Mats Moraing
May 16	Sweden F3 Futures; Båstad, Sweden; Clay $10,000; Singles and doubles draws	(Sweden) Isak Arvidsson (Germany) George von Massow; 6–0, 6–1	(Sweden) Markus Eriksson (Sweden) Milos Sekulic	(Sweden) Dragoș Nicolae Mădăraș (Japan) Kaichi Uchida	(Germany) George von Massow (Sweden) Markus Eriksson (Finland) Eero Vasa (Germany) Mats Moraing
May 16	Tunisia F19 Futures; Hammamet, Tunisia; Clay $10,000; Singles and doubles draws	(Portugal) Pedro Sousa; 6–2, 6–1	(Russia) Alexander Zhurbin	(Italy) Roberto Marcora (Spain) Carlos Taberner	(France) Jonathan Kanar (Italy) Alberto Cammarata (Italy) Fabrizio Ornago (Morocco) Ayoub Chakrouni
May 16	Tunisia F19 Futures; Hammamet, Tunisia; Clay $10,000; Singles and doubles draws	(Uruguay) Marcel Felder (Chile) Cristóbal Saavedra; 6–3, 6–0	(Spain) Carlos Taberner (Japan) Kento Yamada	(Italy) Roberto Marcora (Spain) Carlos Taberner	(France) Jonathan Kanar (Italy) Alberto Cammarata (Italy) Fabrizio Ornago (Morocco) Ayoub Chakrouni
May 16	Turkey F20 Futures; Antalya, Turkey; Hard $10,000; Singles and doubles draws	(Belgium) Christopher Heyman; 3–6, 6–3, 6–4	(Bulgaria) Dimitar Kuzmanov	(Ukraine) Filipp Kekercheni (Turkey) Cem İlkel	(Switzerland) Siméon Rossier (Germany) Nils Brinkman (Turkey) Anıl Yüksel (Turkey) Altuğ Çelikbilek
May 16	Turkey F20 Futures; Antalya, Turkey; Hard $10,000; Singles and doubles draws	(Turkey) Sarp Ağabigün (Turkey) Altuğ Çelikbilek; 7–5, 6–3	(Ukraine) Filipp Kekercheni (Germany) Christoph Negritu	(Ukraine) Filipp Kekercheni (Turkey) Cem İlkel	(Switzerland) Siméon Rossier (Germany) Nils Brinkman (Turkey) Anıl Yüksel (Turkey) Altuğ Çelikbilek
May 16	Ukraine F2 Futures; Cherkassy, Ukraine; Clay $10,000; Singles and doubles draws	(Poland) Kamil Majchrzak; 6–2, 6–4	(Ukraine) Vladyslav Manafov	(Switzerland) Antoine Bellier (Ukraine) Volodymyr Uzhylovskyi	(Ukraine) Denys Mylokostov (Estonia) Vladimir Ivanov (Italy) Davide Galoppini (France) Johan Tatlot
May 16	Ukraine F2 Futures; Cherkassy, Ukraine; Clay $10,000; Singles and doubles draws	(Estonia) Vladimir Ivanov (Lithuania) Lukas Mugevičius; 6–3, 6–3	(Italy) Federico Maccari (Poland) Kamil Majchrzak	(Switzerland) Antoine Bellier (Ukraine) Volodymyr Uzhylovskyi	(Ukraine) Denys Mylokostov (Estonia) Vladimir Ivanov (Italy) Davide Galoppini (France) Johan Tatlot
May 23	China F8 Futures; Lu'an, China, P.R. Hard $25,000; Singles and doubles draws	(Japan) Akira Santillan; 6–3, 1–6, 6–4	(New Zealand) Finn Tearney	(Chinese Taipei) Lee Kuan-yi (United States) Evan King	(Canada) Filip Peliwo (China) Wang Chuhan (Australia) Harry Bourchier (United States) Mitchell Krueger
May 23	China F8 Futures; Lu'an, China, P.R. Hard $25,000; Singles and doubles draws	(China) Gao Xin (China) Ouyang Bowen; 7–5, 6–3	(Chinese Taipei) Peng Hsien-yin (China) Wang Chuhan	(Chinese Taipei) Lee Kuan-yi (United States) Evan King	(Canada) Filip Peliwo (China) Wang Chuhan (Australia) Harry Bourchier (United States) Mitchell Krueger
May 23	Romania F4 Futures; Bacău, Romania; Clay $25,000+H; Singles and doubles draws	(Romania) Dragoș Dima; 6–4, 4–6, 6–2	(Argentina) Juan Pablo Paz	(Italy) Lorenzo Giustino (France) Gleb Sakharov	(Dominican Republic) José Hernández (Belgium) Yannik Reuter (Germany) Oscar Otte (Ecuador) Emilio Gómez
May 23	Romania F4 Futures; Bacău, Romania; Clay $25,000+H; Singles and doubles draws	(Germany) Andreas Mies (Germany) Oscar Otte; 6–3, 6–3	(Colombia) Nicolás Barrientos (Ecuador) Emilio Gómez	(Italy) Lorenzo Giustino (France) Gleb Sakharov	(Dominican Republic) José Hernández (Belgium) Yannik Reuter (Germany) Oscar Otte (Ecuador) Emilio Gómez
May 23	Uzbekistan F3 Futures; Andijan, Uzbekistan; Hard $25,000; Singles and doubles draws	(Uzbekistan) Temur Ismailov; 2–6, 7–5, 7–5	(Chinese Taipei) Chen Ti	(Belarus) Yaraslav Shyla (India) Sriram Balaji	(Uzbekistan) Sanjar Fayziev (Kazakhstan) Denis Yevseyev (Russia) Markos Kalovelonis (Indonesia) Christopher Rungkat
May 23	Uzbekistan F3 Futures; Andijan, Uzbekistan; Hard $25,000; Singles and doubles draws	(India) Sriram Balaji (Russia) Markos Kalovelonis; 6–3, 6–4	(Kazakhstan) Roman Khassanov (Russia) Vitaly Kozyukov	(Belarus) Yaraslav Shyla (India) Sriram Balaji	(Uzbekistan) Sanjar Fayziev (Kazakhstan) Denis Yevseyev (Russia) Markos Kalovelonis (Indonesia) Christopher Rungkat
May 23	Algeria F3 Futures; Algiers, Algeria; Clay $10,000; Singles and doubles draws	(France) Sadio Doumbia; 6–2, 6–4	(Slovakia) Filip Horanský	(France) Grégoire Jacq (Spain) Mario Vilella Martínez	(France) Jonathan Kanar (Spain) Aaron Cortes Alcaraz (Brazil) Rafael Camilo (France) Fabien Reboul
May 23	Algeria F3 Futures; Algiers, Algeria; Clay $10,000; Singles and doubles draws	(Venezuela) Jordi Muñoz Abreu (France) Fabien Reboul; 6–4, 7–6^{(7–4)}	(France) Grégoire Jacq (France) Jonathan Kanar	(France) Grégoire Jacq (Spain) Mario Vilella Martínez	(France) Jonathan Kanar (Spain) Aaron Cortes Alcaraz (Brazil) Rafael Camilo (France) Fabien Reboul
May 23	Argentina F8 Futures; Buenos Aires, Argentina; Clay $10,000; Singles and doubles draws	(Brazil) Daniel Dutra da Silva; 4–6, 6–2, 6–3	(Argentina) Gonzalo Villanueva	(Argentina) Federico Coria (Argentina) Andrea Collarini	(Brazil) Igor Marcondes (Chile) Juan Carlos Sáez (Argentina) Hernán Casanova (Argentina) Juan Ignacio Galarza
May 23	Argentina F8 Futures; Buenos Aires, Argentina; Clay $10,000; Singles and doubles draws	(Argentina) Gabriel Alejandro Hidalgo (Argentina) Eduardo Agustín Torre; 6–1, 0–6, [11–9]	(Chile) Guillermo Rivera-Aránguiz (Chile) Juan Carlos Sáez	(Argentina) Federico Coria (Argentina) Andrea Collarini	(Brazil) Igor Marcondes (Chile) Juan Carlos Sáez (Argentina) Hernán Casanova (Argentina) Juan Ignacio Galarza
May 23	Bosnia & Herzegovina F3 Futures; Kiseljak, Bosnia & Herzegovina; Clay $10,000; Singles and doubles draws	(Italy) Gianluigi Quinzi; 6–2, 6–4	(Serbia) Dejan Katić	(Sweden) Christian Lindell (France) Laurent Lokoli	(Croatia) Mate Delić (Croatia) Kristijan Mesaroš (North Macedonia) Tomislav Jotovski (France) Corentin Denolly
May 23	Bosnia & Herzegovina F3 Futures; Kiseljak, Bosnia & Herzegovina; Clay $10,000; Singles and doubles draws	(Australia) Steven de Waard (Australia) Scott Puodziunas; 6–3, 7–5	(Brazil) Wilson Leite (Sweden) Christian Lindell	(Sweden) Christian Lindell (France) Laurent Lokoli	(Croatia) Mate Delić (Croatia) Kristijan Mesaroš (North Macedonia) Tomislav Jotovski (France) Corentin Denolly
May 23	Bulgaria F2 Futures; Ruse, Bulgaria; Clay $10,000; Singles and doubles draws	(Belgium) Germain Gigounon; 7–6^{(7–4)}, 6–3	(Spain) David Pérez Sanz	(Spain) Rubén Ramírez Hidalgo (Bulgaria) Alexander Lazov	(Bulgaria) Alexandar Lazarov (France) Gianni Mina (Spain) Pedro Martínez (Venezuela) Ricardo Rodríguez
May 23	Bulgaria F2 Futures; Ruse, Bulgaria; Clay $10,000; Singles and doubles draws	(Germany) Jonas Lütjen (Germany) Timon Reichelt; 6–0, 6–2	(Russia) Anton Galkin (Russia) Ilya Lebedev	(Spain) Rubén Ramírez Hidalgo (Bulgaria) Alexander Lazov	(Bulgaria) Alexandar Lazarov (France) Gianni Mina (Spain) Pedro Martínez (Venezuela) Ricardo Rodríguez
May 23	Czech Republic F3 Futures; Jablonec nad Nisou, Czech Republic; Clay $10,000; Singles and doubles draws	(Czech Republic) Marek Michalička; 3–6, 6–4, 7–6^{(7–5)}	(Poland) Hubert Hurkacz	(Czech Republic) Jan Mertl (Czech Republic) Michal Franěk	(Czech Republic) Jan Šátral (Slovakia) Patrik Néma (Czech Republic) Michal Konečný (Czech Republic) Václav Šafránek
May 23	Czech Republic F3 Futures; Jablonec nad Nisou, Czech Republic; Clay $10,000; Singles and doubles draws	(Germany) Jan Choinski (Germany) Tom Schönenberg; 6–2, 7–6^{(9–7)}	(Poland) Hubert Hurkacz (Poland) Szymon Walków	(Czech Republic) Jan Mertl (Czech Republic) Michal Franěk	(Czech Republic) Jan Šátral (Slovakia) Patrik Néma (Czech Republic) Michal Konečný (Czech Republic) Václav Šafránek
May 23	Guam F1 Futures; Tumon, Guam; Hard $10,000; Singles and doubles draws	(Australia) Andrew Whittington; 7–6^{(8–6)}, 7–6^{(7–2)}	(Japan) Shuichi Sekiguchi	(United States) Deiton Baughman (Japan) Masato Shiga	(Japan) Takuto Niki (Japan) Sho Katayama (Japan) Masaki Sasai (Japan) Gengo Kikuchi
May 23	Guam F1 Futures; Tumon, Guam; Hard $10,000; Singles and doubles draws	(Japan) Toshihide Matsui (Australia) Andrew Whittington; 6–3, 3–6, [10–8]	(Japan) Sho Katayama (Japan) Yutaro Matsuzaki	(United States) Deiton Baughman (Japan) Masato Shiga	(Japan) Takuto Niki (Japan) Sho Katayama (Japan) Masaki Sasai (Japan) Gengo Kikuchi
May 23	Israel F8 Futures; Ramat Gan, Israel; Hard $10,000; Singles and doubles draws	(United States) Nicolas Meister; 6–3, 6–4	(Israel) Bar Tzuf Botzer	(Israel) Daniel Cukierman (United States) Nick Chappell	(Israel) Ben Patael (United States) Quinton Vega (Israel) Dekel Bar (France) Joan Soler
May 23	Israel F8 Futures; Ramat Gan, Israel; Hard $10,000; Singles and doubles draws	(Australia) Jarryd Chaplin (New Zealand) Ben McLachlan; 7–5, 7–6^{(7–1)}	(United States) Nicolas Meister (United States) Hunter Reese	(Israel) Daniel Cukierman (United States) Nick Chappell	(Israel) Ben Patael (United States) Quinton Vega (Israel) Dekel Bar (France) Joan Soler
May 23	Italy F12 Futures; Lecco, Italy; Clay $10,000; Singles and doubles draws	(Greece) Stefanos Tsitsipas; 7–6^{(10–8)}, 7–6^{(7–3)}	(Italy) Marco Bortolotti	(Italy) Lorenzo Frigerio (Italy) Claudio Fortuna	(Italy) Alessandro Bega (Uzbekistan) Khumoyun Sultanov (Germany) Pascal Meis (Italy) Liam Caruana
May 23	Italy F12 Futures; Lecco, Italy; Clay $10,000; Singles and doubles draws	(Turkey) Tuna Altuna (Poland) Andriej Kapaś; 6–7^{(7–9)}, 6–2, [10–7]	(Italy) Andrea Vavassori (Italy) Matteo Volante	(Italy) Lorenzo Frigerio (Italy) Claudio Fortuna	(Italy) Alessandro Bega (Uzbekistan) Khumoyun Sultanov (Germany) Pascal Meis (Italy) Liam Caruana
May 23	Mexico F4 Futures; Morelia, Mexico; Hard $10,000; Singles and doubles draws	(Ecuador) Roberto Quiroz; 7–5, 7–5	(Guatemala) Christopher Díaz Figueroa	(Colombia) Alejandro Gómez (Zimbabwe) Takanyi Garanganga	(Mexico) Luis Patiño (Brazil) Ricardo Hocevar (Mexico) Manuel Sánchez (Bolivia) Federico Zeballos
May 23	Mexico F4 Futures; Morelia, Mexico; Hard $10,000; Singles and doubles draws	(Mexico) Hans Hach Verdugo (Mexico) Luis Patiño; 6–3, 6–2	(Bolivia) Alejandro Mendoza (Bolivia) Federico Zeballos	(Colombia) Alejandro Gómez (Zimbabwe) Takanyi Garanganga	(Mexico) Luis Patiño (Brazil) Ricardo Hocevar (Mexico) Manuel Sánchez (Bolivia) Federico Zeballos
May 23	Portugal F7 Futures; Lisbon, Portugal; Hard $10,000; Singles and doubles draws	(Portugal) Fred Gil; 6–3, 7–6^{(8–6)}	(Portugal) João Domingues	(Portugal) Pedro Sousa (United States) Cătălin-Ionuț Gârd	(Spain) Jorge Hernando-Ruano (Japan) Jumpei Yamasaki (Australia) Daniel Hobart (Portugal) Nuno Deus
May 23	Portugal F7 Futures; Lisbon, Portugal; Hard $10,000; Singles and doubles draws	(Portugal) Nuno Deus (Portugal) João Domingues; 6–4, 6–7^{(3–7)}, [10–6]	(United States) Cătălin-Ionuț Gârd (Portugal) Fred Gil	(Portugal) Pedro Sousa (United States) Cătălin-Ionuț Gârd	(Spain) Jorge Hernando-Ruano (Japan) Jumpei Yamasaki (Australia) Daniel Hobart (Portugal) Nuno Deus
May 23	Spain F15 Futures; Santa Margarida de Montbui, Spain; Hard $10,000; Singles and doubles draws	(Spain) Ricardo Ojeda Lara; 6–1, 6–7^{(5–7)}, 6–4	(Colombia) Eduardo Struvay	(Spain) Jaume Munar (Spain) Andrés Artuñedo	(Japan) Ryota Tanuma (Spain) Carlos Boluda-Purkiss (Spain) Pol Toledo Bagué (France) Hugo Grenier
May 23	Spain F15 Futures; Santa Margarida de Montbui, Spain; Hard $10,000; Singles and doubles draws	(Spain) Jan Pallares Monreal (Spain) Albert Roglan; 6–3, 6–7^{(4–7)}, [10–8]	(Spain) Carlos Boluda-Purkiss (Spain) David Vega Hernández	(Spain) Jaume Munar (Spain) Andrés Artuñedo	(Japan) Ryota Tanuma (Spain) Carlos Boluda-Purkiss (Spain) Pol Toledo Bagué (France) Hugo Grenier
May 23	Tunisia F20 Futures; Hammamet, Tunisia; Clay $10,000; Singles and doubles draws	(Chile) Christian Garin; 6–3, 7–6^{(7–1)}	(Spain) Carlos Taberner	(Colombia) Cristian Rodríguez (Egypt) Karim-Mohamed Maamoun	(Spain) Oriol Roca Batalla (Italy) Walter Trusendi (Italy) Pietro Rondoni (Tunisia) Anis Ghorbel
May 23	Tunisia F20 Futures; Hammamet, Tunisia; Clay $10,000; Singles and doubles draws	(Uruguay) Marcel Felder (Chile) Cristóbal Saavedra; 6–4, 6–2	(Italy) Antonio Campo (Italy) Pietro Rondoni	(Colombia) Cristian Rodríguez (Egypt) Karim-Mohamed Maamoun	(Spain) Oriol Roca Batalla (Italy) Walter Trusendi (Italy) Pietro Rondoni (Tunisia) Anis Ghorbel
May 23	Turkey F21 Futures; Antalya, Turkey; Hard $10,000; Singles and doubles draws	(Belgium) Christopher Heyman; 6–3, 7–6^{(7–5)}	(Turkey) Cem İlkel	(Germany) Christoph Negritu (Spain) José Francisco Vidal Azorín	(Turkey) Muhammet Haylaz (United States) Conor Berg (South Korea) Choi Seung-ri (Turkey) Altuğ Çelikbilek
May 23	Turkey F21 Futures; Antalya, Turkey; Hard $10,000; Singles and doubles draws	(Brazil) Pedro Bernardi (Brazil) Fabiano de Paula; 2–6, 6–2, [10–4]	(Brazil) Marcelo Tebet (Brazil) Fernando Yamacita	(Germany) Christoph Negritu (Spain) José Francisco Vidal Azorín	(Turkey) Muhammet Haylaz (United States) Conor Berg (South Korea) Choi Seung-ri (Turkey) Altuğ Çelikbilek
May 23	Ukraine F3 Futures; Cherkassy, Ukraine; Clay $10,000; Singles and doubles draws	(Russia) Ivan Nedelko; 4–6, 6–2, 6–3	(Ukraine) Denys Mylokostov	(Ukraine) Vladyslav Manafov (Ukraine) Volodymyr Uzhylovskyi	(Switzerland) Antoine Bellier (Ukraine) Vadim Alekseenko (Estonia) Vladimir Ivanov (Poland) Kamil Majchrzak
May 23	Ukraine F3 Futures; Cherkassy, Ukraine; Clay $10,000; Singles and doubles draws	(Bulgaria) Vasko Mladenov (Ukraine) Volodymyr Uzhylovskyi; 6–4, 6–1	(Ukraine) Denys Mylokostov (Ukraine) Danylo Veremeychuk	(Ukraine) Vladyslav Manafov (Ukraine) Volodymyr Uzhylovskyi	(Switzerland) Antoine Bellier (Ukraine) Vadim Alekseenko (Estonia) Vladimir Ivanov (Poland) Kamil Majchrzak
May 30	China F9 Futures; Jinan, China, P.R. Hard $25,000; Singles and doubles draws	(United States) Mitchell Krueger; 7–6^{(7–4)}, 6–3	(New Zealand) Finn Tearney	(Chinese Taipei) Huang Liang-chi (Japan) Akira Santillan	(Chinese Taipei) Lee Kuan-yi (China) Sun Fajing (China) Wang Chuhan (United States) Connor Smith
May 30	China F9 Futures; Jinan, China, P.R. Hard $25,000; Singles and doubles draws	(China) Gong Maoxin (Chinese Taipei) Peng Hsien-yin; 7–6^{(7–2)}, 6–4	(United States) Mitchell Krueger (United States) Connor Smith	(Chinese Taipei) Huang Liang-chi (Japan) Akira Santillan	(Chinese Taipei) Lee Kuan-yi (China) Sun Fajing (China) Wang Chuhan (United States) Connor Smith
May 30	Japan F6 Futures; Karuizawa, Japan; Clay $25,000; Singles and doubles draws	(South Korea) Lee Duck-hee; 7–6^{(7–4)}, 6–3	(Japan) Yasutaka Uchiyama	(United States) Deiton Baughman (Japan) Shuichi Sekiguchi	(Japan) Yuya Kibi (Japan) Gengo Kikuchi (Japan) Yuichi Ito (Japan) Makoto Ochi
May 30	Japan F6 Futures; Karuizawa, Japan; Clay $25,000; Singles and doubles draws	(Japan) Yasutaka Uchiyama (Australia) Andrew Whittington; 7–6^{(7–1)}, 6–4	(Japan) Katsuki Nagao (Japan) Hiromasa Oku	(United States) Deiton Baughman (Japan) Shuichi Sekiguchi	(Japan) Yuya Kibi (Japan) Gengo Kikuchi (Japan) Yuichi Ito (Japan) Makoto Ochi
May 30	Uzbekistan F4 Futures; Namangan, Uzbekistan; Hard $25,000; Singles and doubles draws	(Chinese Taipei) Chen Ti; 6–4, 6–2	(Russia) Markos Kalovelonis	(Indonesia) Christopher Rungkat (Uzbekistan) Temur Ismailov	(Russia) Artur Shakhnubaryan (Uzbekistan) Sergey Fomin (Russia) Evgeny Karlovskiy (Russia) Vitaly Kozyukov
May 30	Uzbekistan F4 Futures; Namangan, Uzbekistan; Hard $25,000; Singles and doubles draws	(Kazakhstan) Timur Khabibulin (Belarus) Yaraslav Shyla; 6–3, 6–3	(Chinese Taipei) Chen Ti (Russia) Denis Matsukevich	(Indonesia) Christopher Rungkat (Uzbekistan) Temur Ismailov	(Russia) Artur Shakhnubaryan (Uzbekistan) Sergey Fomin (Russia) Evgeny Karlovskiy (Russia) Vitaly Kozyukov
May 30	Argentina F9 Futures; Buenos Aires, Argentina; Clay $10,000; Singles and doubles draws	(Brazil) Daniel Dutra da Silva; 1–6, 6–2, 6–3	(Chile) Juan Carlos Sáez	(Argentina) Federico Coria (Chile) Guillermo Rivera-Aránguiz	(Argentina) Maximiliano Estévez (Argentina) Gonzalo Villanueva (Argentina) Hernán Casanova (Argentina) Juan Ignacio Galarza
May 30	Argentina F9 Futures; Buenos Aires, Argentina; Clay $10,000; Singles and doubles draws	(Argentina) Gabriel Alejandro Hidalgo (Argentina) Eduardo Agustín Torre; 6–4, 6–3	(Argentina) Federico Coria (Argentina) Maximiliano Estévez	(Argentina) Federico Coria (Chile) Guillermo Rivera-Aránguiz	(Argentina) Maximiliano Estévez (Argentina) Gonzalo Villanueva (Argentina) Hernán Casanova (Argentina) Juan Ignacio Galarza
May 30	Bosnia & Herzegovina F4 Futures; Sarajevo, Bosnia & Herzegovina; Clay $10,000; Singles and doubles draws	(France) Laurent Lokoli; 6–3, 6–1	(Australia) Steven de Waard	(Croatia) Nino Serdarušić (Croatia) Duje Kekez	(Canada) Frank Dancevic (Australia) Scott Puodziunas (Germany) Elmar Ejupovic (Hungary) Viktor Filipenkó
May 30	Bosnia & Herzegovina F4 Futures; Sarajevo, Bosnia & Herzegovina; Clay $10,000; Singles and doubles draws	(Croatia) Tomislav Draganja (Croatia) Nino Serdarušić; 7–5, 6–3	(Croatia) Ivan Sabanov (Croatia) Matej Sabanov	(Croatia) Nino Serdarušić (Croatia) Duje Kekez	(Canada) Frank Dancevic (Australia) Scott Puodziunas (Germany) Elmar Ejupovic (Hungary) Viktor Filipenkó
May 30	Bulgaria F3 Futures; Stara Zagora, Bulgaria; Clay $10,000; Singles and doubles draws	(Spain) Pedro Martínez; 6–3, 6–1	(Belgium) Germain Gigounon	(Germany) Jonas Lütjen (Venezuela) Ricardo Rodríguez	(Bulgaria) Tihomir Grozdanov (Bulgaria) Alexander Lazov (Canada) Martin Beran (France) Corentin Denolly
May 30	Bulgaria F3 Futures; Stara Zagora, Bulgaria; Clay $10,000; Singles and doubles draws	(Bulgaria) Vasko Mladenov (Russia) Yan Sabanin; 6–2, 7–6^{(7–2)}	(Spain) Carlos Calderón-Rodríguez (Spain) Pedro Martínez	(Germany) Jonas Lütjen (Venezuela) Ricardo Rodríguez	(Bulgaria) Tihomir Grozdanov (Bulgaria) Alexander Lazov (Canada) Martin Beran (France) Corentin Denolly
May 30	Israel F9 Futures; Kiryat Shmona, Israel; Hard $10,000; Singles and doubles draws	(Israel) Edan Leshem; 6–3, 6–3	(United States) Nick Chappell	(France) Antoine Escoffier (Israel) Ben Patael	(United States) Cameron Silverman (Israel) Dekel Bar (Australia) Jarryd Chaplin (New Zealand) Ben McLachlan
May 30	Israel F9 Futures; Kiryat Shmona, Israel; Hard $10,000; Singles and doubles draws	(Australia) Jarryd Chaplin (New Zealand) Ben McLachlan; 6–2, 6–3	(United States) Cameron Silverman (United States) Quinton Vega	(France) Antoine Escoffier (Israel) Ben Patael	(United States) Cameron Silverman (Israel) Dekel Bar (Australia) Jarryd Chaplin (New Zealand) Ben McLachlan
May 30	Italy F13 Futures; Padua, Italy; Clay $10,000; Singles and doubles draws	(Italy) Riccardo Bellotti; 2–6, 6–1, 6–1	(Italy) Matteo Viola	(France) Maxime Chazal (Italy) Lorenzo Giustino	(Italy) Marco Bortolotti (Italy) Filippo Baldi (Australia) Maverick Banes (Serbia) Danilo Petrović
May 30	Italy F13 Futures; Padua, Italy; Clay $10,000; Singles and doubles draws	(Australia) Maverick Banes (Australia) Gavin van Peperzeel; 6–3, 6–3	(Italy) Omar Giacalone (Italy) Matteo Volante	(France) Maxime Chazal (Italy) Lorenzo Giustino	(Italy) Marco Bortolotti (Italy) Filippo Baldi (Australia) Maverick Banes (Serbia) Danilo Petrović
May 30	Mexico F5 Futures; Zapopan, Mexico; Clay $10,000; Singles and doubles draws	(United States) Adam El Mihdawy; 6–3, 4–6, 6–2	(Mexico) Luis Patiño	(Brazil) Ricardo Hocevar (Bolivia) Federico Zeballos	(Guatemala) Christopher Díaz Figueroa (Mexico) Manuel Sánchez (Mexico) Hans Hach Verdugo (Bolivia) Alejandro Mendoza
May 30	Mexico F5 Futures; Zapopan, Mexico; Clay $10,000; Singles and doubles draws	(Mexico) Mauricio Astorga (Mexico) Manuel Sánchez; 6–4, 2–6, [10–8]	(Colombia) José Daniel Bendeck (Colombia) Alejandro Gómez	(Brazil) Ricardo Hocevar (Bolivia) Federico Zeballos	(Guatemala) Christopher Díaz Figueroa (Mexico) Manuel Sánchez (Mexico) Hans Hach Verdugo (Bolivia) Alejandro Mendoza
May 30	Poland F2 Futures; Koszalin, Poland; Clay $10,000; Singles and doubles draws	(Poland) Pawel Ciaś; 6–4, 6–2	(Czech Republic) Michal Schmid	(Czech Republic) Libor Salaba (Poland) Andriej Kapaś	(Germany) Sebastian Fanselow (Spain) Sergio Martos Gornés (Poland) Grzegorz Panfil (Netherlands) Lennert van der Linden
May 30	Poland F2 Futures; Koszalin, Poland; Clay $10,000; Singles and doubles draws	(Poland) Kamil Gajewski (Poland) Szymon Walków; 6–2, 6–1	(Poland) Adam Majchrowicz (Poland) Grzegorz Panfil	(Czech Republic) Libor Salaba (Poland) Andriej Kapaś	(Germany) Sebastian Fanselow (Spain) Sergio Martos Gornés (Poland) Grzegorz Panfil (Netherlands) Lennert van der Linden
May 30	Tunisia F21 Futures; Hammamet, Tunisia; Clay $10,000; Singles and doubles draws	(Chile) Christian Garin; 6–4, 2–6, 6–0	(Serbia) Nikola Milojević	(Italy) Walter Trusendi (Spain) Roberto Ortega Olmedo	(Italy) Riccardo Sinicropi (France) Hugo Grenier (Chile) Cristóbal Saavedra (Colombia) Cristian Rodríguez
May 30	Tunisia F21 Futures; Hammamet, Tunisia; Clay $10,000; Singles and doubles draws	(Colombia) Cristian Rodríguez (Italy) Walter Trusendi; 6–3, 2–6, [10–7]	(Egypt) Karim-Mohamed Maamoun (Spain) Roberto Ortega Olmedo	(Italy) Walter Trusendi (Spain) Roberto Ortega Olmedo	(Italy) Riccardo Sinicropi (France) Hugo Grenier (Chile) Cristóbal Saavedra (Colombia) Cristian Rodríguez
May 30	Turkey F22 Futures; Antalya, Turkey; Hard $10,000; Singles and doubles draws	(Germany) Marc Sieber; 6–0, 6–1	(South Africa) Nicolaas Scholtz	(Italy) Francesco Vilardo (Brazil) Fabiano de Paula	(Germany) Nils Brinkmann (Germany) Bastian Wagner (Dominican Republic) José Olivares (Italy) Claudio Fortuna
May 30	Turkey F22 Futures; Antalya, Turkey; Hard $10,000; Singles and doubles draws	(Brazil) Pedro Bernardi (Brazil) Fabiano de Paula; 6–1, 6–0	(Germany) Marc Sieber (Italy) Francesco Vilardo	(Italy) Francesco Vilardo (Brazil) Fabiano de Paula	(Germany) Nils Brinkmann (Germany) Bastian Wagner (Dominican Republic) José Olivares (Italy) Claudio Fortuna

=== June ===
Week of	Tournament	Winner	Runners-up	Semifinalists	Quarterfinalists
June 6	Spain F16 Futures; Huelva, Spain; Clay $25,000; Singles and doubles draws	(Portugal) João Domingues; 6–4, 6–3	(Spain) Mario Vilella Martínez	(France) Maxime Hamou (France) Maxime Tabatruong	(Spain) Carlos Taberner (Netherlands) Scott Griekspoor (Belgium) Niels Desein (Spain) Ricardo Ojeda Lara
June 6	Spain F16 Futures; Huelva, Spain; Clay $25,000; Singles and doubles draws	(Spain) Iván Arenas-Gualda (Spain) David Vega Hernández; 6–4, 6–2	(Belgium) Niels Desein (Morocco) Lamine Ouahab	(France) Maxime Hamou (France) Maxime Tabatruong	(Spain) Carlos Taberner (Netherlands) Scott Griekspoor (Belgium) Niels Desein (Spain) Ricardo Ojeda Lara
June 6	United States F17 Futures; Charlottesville, United States; Hard $25,000; Singles and doubles draws	(United States) Tennys Sandgren; 6–3, 6–3	(United States) Dennis Nevolo	(Barbados) Darian King (United States) Thai-Son Kwiatkowski	(Canada) Peter Polansky (United States) Mac Styslinger (United States) Eric Quigley (United States) Alex Kuznetsov
June 6	United States F17 Futures; Charlottesville, United States; Hard $25,000; Singles and doubles draws	(United States) Thai-Son Kwiatkowski (United States) Mac Styslinger; 6–4, 6–1	(Australia) Greg Jones (New Zealand) Jose Statham	(Barbados) Darian King (United States) Thai-Son Kwiatkowski	(Canada) Peter Polansky (United States) Mac Styslinger (United States) Eric Quigley (United States) Alex Kuznetsov
June 6	Bulgaria F4 Futures; Plovdiv, Bulgaria; Clay $10,000; Singles and doubles draws	(Spain) Pedro Martínez; 7–6^{(7–5)}, 6–2	(Bulgaria) Dimitar Kuzmanov	(Bulgaria) Alexandar Lazarov (Canada) Martin Beran	(Spain) Sergio Martos Gornés (Bulgaria) Gabriel Donev (United States) Cătălin-Ionuț Gârd (Chile) Cristóbal Saavedra
June 6	Bulgaria F4 Futures; Plovdiv, Bulgaria; Clay $10,000; Singles and doubles draws	(Australia) Steven de Waard (Australia) Scott Puodziunas; 4–6, 7–5, [10–7]	(Canada) Martin Beran (Venezuela) Diego-José Manrique-Velázquez	(Bulgaria) Alexandar Lazarov (Canada) Martin Beran	(Spain) Sergio Martos Gornés (Bulgaria) Gabriel Donev (United States) Cătălin-Ionuț Gârd (Chile) Cristóbal Saavedra
June 6	Hong Kong F1 Futures; Hong Kong, China; Hard $10,000; Singles and doubles draws	(Australia) Andrew Whittington; 7–5, 6–3	(China) He Yecong	(Chinese Taipei) Huang Liang-chi (Chinese Taipei) Yu Cheng-yu	(Indonesia) Christopher Rungkat (Australia) Daniel Nolan (Australia) Aaron Addison (Chinese Taipei) Lee Kuan-yi
June 6	Hong Kong F1 Futures; Hong Kong, China; Hard $10,000; Singles and doubles draws	(China) Ning Yuqing (Chinese Taipei) Yu Cheng-yu; Walkover	(Chinese Taipei) Huang Liang-chi (Chinese Taipei) Yi Chu-huan	(Chinese Taipei) Huang Liang-chi (Chinese Taipei) Yu Cheng-yu	(Indonesia) Christopher Rungkat (Australia) Daniel Nolan (Australia) Aaron Addison (Chinese Taipei) Lee Kuan-yi
June 6	Israel F10 Futures; Acre, Israel; Hard $10,000; Singles and doubles draws	(Israel) Edan Leshem; 6–2, 6–1	(United States) Nick Chappell	(Australia) Jarryd Chaplin (Israel) Daniel Cukierman	(Republic of Ireland) Sam Barry (Israel) Bar Tzuf Botzer (Israel) Tal Goldengoren (United States) Collin Johns
June 6	Israel F10 Futures; Acre, Israel; Hard $10,000; Singles and doubles draws	(Australia) Jarryd Chaplin (Australia) Benjamin Mitchell; 2–6, 6–3, [10–5]	(United States) Nick Chappell (Germany) Milen Ianakiev	(Australia) Jarryd Chaplin (Israel) Daniel Cukierman	(Republic of Ireland) Sam Barry (Israel) Bar Tzuf Botzer (Israel) Tal Goldengoren (United States) Collin Johns
June 6	Italy F14 Futures; Bergamo, Italy; Clay $10,000; Singles and doubles draws	(Italy) Adelchi Virgili; 6–3, 6–4	(Brazil) João Pedro Sorgi	(Italy) Riccardo Bellotti (Australia) Maverick Banes	(Brazil) Orlando Luz (Italy) Andrea Pellegrino (Italy) Jacopo Stefanini (Australia) Christopher O'Connell
June 6	Italy F14 Futures; Bergamo, Italy; Clay $10,000; Singles and doubles draws	(Germany) Jakob Sude (Italy) Matteo Volante; 2–6, 6–1, [10–4]	(Argentina) Mateo Nicolás Martínez (Brazil) João Pedro Sorgi	(Italy) Riccardo Bellotti (Australia) Maverick Banes	(Brazil) Orlando Luz (Italy) Andrea Pellegrino (Italy) Jacopo Stefanini (Australia) Christopher O'Connell
June 6	Japan F7 Futures; Tokyo, Japan; Hard $10,000; Singles and doubles draws	(United States) Evan King; 6–2, 7–6^{(7–1)}	(Japan) Sho Katayama	(Japan) Yusuke Takahashi (Japan) Yuya Ito	(South Korea) Oh Chan-yeong (Japan) Masato Shiga (Japan) Kento Takeuchi (Japan) Yusuke Watanuki
June 6	Japan F7 Futures; Tokyo, Japan; Hard $10,000; Singles and doubles draws	(Japan) Yosuke Watanuki (Japan) Yusuke Watanuki; 6–3, 6–4	(Japan) Soichiro Moritani (Japan) Issei Okamura	(Japan) Yusuke Takahashi (Japan) Yuya Ito	(South Korea) Oh Chan-yeong (Japan) Masato Shiga (Japan) Kento Takeuchi (Japan) Yusuke Watanuki
June 6	Mozambique F1 Futures; Maputo, Mozambique; Hard $10,000; Singles and doubles draws	(Australia) Marc Polmans; 4–6, 6–2, 7–5	(South Africa) Lloyd Harris	(Italy) Julian Ocleppo (Argentina) Matías Franco Descotte	(Tunisia) Mohamed Aziz Dougaz (United States) John Lamble (Australia) Jeremy Beale (South Africa) Tucker Vorster
June 6	Mozambique F1 Futures; Maputo, Mozambique; Hard $10,000; Singles and doubles draws	(United States) Christopher Grant (United States) Michael Grant; 6–2, 1–6, [10–8]	(United States) John Lamble (Portugal) Bernardo Saraiva	(Italy) Julian Ocleppo (Argentina) Matías Franco Descotte	(Tunisia) Mohamed Aziz Dougaz (United States) John Lamble (Australia) Jeremy Beale (South Africa) Tucker Vorster
June 6	Poland F3 Futures; Sopot, Poland; Clay $10,000; Singles and doubles draws	(Poland) Kamil Majchrzak; 7–5, 6–4	(Poland) Andriej Kapaś	(Italy) Fabrizio Ornago (Czech Republic) David Poljak	(Poland) Hubert Hurkacz (Poland) Pawel Ciaś (Poland) Grzegorz Panfil (Poland) Kacper Żuk
June 6	Poland F3 Futures; Sopot, Poland; Clay $10,000; Singles and doubles draws	(Poland) Piotr Matuszewski (Poland) Kacper Żuk; 7–6^{(7–5)}, 6–3	(Poland) Andriej Kapaś (Poland) Adam Majchrowicz	(Italy) Fabrizio Ornago (Czech Republic) David Poljak	(Poland) Hubert Hurkacz (Poland) Pawel Ciaś (Poland) Grzegorz Panfil (Poland) Kacper Żuk
June 6	Romania F5 Futures; Arad, Romania; Clay $10,000; Singles and doubles draws	(Romania) Petru-Alexandru Luncanu; 6–3, 4–6, 6–4	(Italy) Roberto Marcora	(Germany) Tobias Simon (Czech Republic) Václav Šafránek	(Slovenia) Nik Razboršek (Brazil) Thales Turini (Hungary) André Biró (Switzerland) Johan Nikles
June 6	Romania F5 Futures; Arad, Romania; Clay $10,000; Singles and doubles draws	(Ukraine) Danylo Kalenichenko (Austria) David Pichler; 6–4, 6–1	(Romania) Victor-Mugurel Anagnastopol (Romania) Victor Vlad Cornea	(Germany) Tobias Simon (Czech Republic) Václav Šafránek	(Slovenia) Nik Razboršek (Brazil) Thales Turini (Hungary) André Biró (Switzerland) Johan Nikles
June 6	Turkey F23 Futures; Antalya, Turkey; Hard $10,000; Singles and doubles draws	(Germany) Marc Sieber; 6–4, 6–1	(Italy) Claudio Fortuna	(France) Yannick Jankovits (South Africa) Nicolaas Scholtz	(Spain) Carlos Boluda-Purkiss (United Kingdom) Joshua Paris (Italy) Riccardo Bonadio (Italy) Francesco Vilardo
June 6	Turkey F23 Futures; Antalya, Turkey; Hard $10,000; Singles and doubles draws	(Brazil) Pedro Bernardi (Brazil) Fabiano de Paula; 6–4, 5–7, [10–7]	(Germany) Marc Sieber (Austria) Thomas Statzberger	(France) Yannick Jankovits (South Africa) Nicolaas Scholtz	(Spain) Carlos Boluda-Purkiss (United Kingdom) Joshua Paris (Italy) Riccardo Bonadio (Italy) Francesco Vilardo
June 13	Korea F1 Futures; Daegu, Korea; Hard $25,000; Singles and doubles draws	(South Korea) Lim Yong-kyu; 4–6, 6–3, 6–0	(South Korea) Cho Min-hyeok	(Japan) Makoto Ochi (South Korea) Dylan Seong-kwan Kim	(South Korea) Nam Ji-sung (South Korea) Moon Ju-hae (South Korea) Seol Jae-min (South Korea) Kwon Oh-hee
June 13	Korea F1 Futures; Daegu, Korea; Hard $25,000; Singles and doubles draws	(South Korea) Jun Woong-sun (South Korea) Nam Hyun-woo; 6–3, 5–7, [10–7]	(South Korea) Choi Jae-won (South Korea) Kim Hyun-joon	(Japan) Makoto Ochi (South Korea) Dylan Seong-kwan Kim	(South Korea) Nam Ji-sung (South Korea) Moon Ju-hae (South Korea) Seol Jae-min (South Korea) Kwon Oh-hee
June 13	United States F18 Futures; Winston-Salem, United States; Hard $25,000; Singles and doubles draws	(United States) Sekou Bangoura; 6–3, 6–2	(Barbados) Darian King	(United States) Alex Kuznetsov (Canada) Peter Polansky	(United States) Emil Reinberg (United States) Rhyne Williams (New Zealand) Jose Statham (United States) Eric Quigley
June 13	United States F18 Futures; Winston-Salem, United States; Hard $25,000; Singles and doubles draws	(United States) Jared Hiltzik (United States) Thai-Son Kwiatkowski; 6–4, 6–2	(United States) Austin Smith (United States) Dennis Uspensky	(United States) Alex Kuznetsov (Canada) Peter Polansky	(United States) Emil Reinberg (United States) Rhyne Williams (New Zealand) Jose Statham (United States) Eric Quigley
June 13	Belgium F1 Futures; Binche, Belgium; Clay $10,000; Singles and doubles draws	(Belgium) Niels Desein; 6–3, 6–7^{(3–7)}, 6–1	(France) Arthur Rinderknech	(France) Enzo Couacaud (Belgium) Maxime Authom	(Belgium) Clément Geens (Belgium) Benjamin D'Hoe (Belgium) Germain Gigounon (Belgium) Romain Barbosa
June 13	Belgium F1 Futures; Binche, Belgium; Clay $10,000; Singles and doubles draws	(Egypt) Sherif Sabry (Germany) Tom Schönenberg; 6–3, 7–6^{(7–4)}	(Belgium) Romain Barbosa (Belgium) Alexandre Folie	(France) Enzo Couacaud (Belgium) Maxime Authom	(Belgium) Clément Geens (Belgium) Benjamin D'Hoe (Belgium) Germain Gigounon (Belgium) Romain Barbosa
June 13	Colombia F1 Futures; Cartagena, Colombia; Hard $10,000; Singles and doubles draws	(Colombia) Alejandro Gómez; 6–4, 2–6, 7–6^{(7–4)}	(Colombia) Juan Sebastián Gómez	(Dominican Republic) Roberto Cid Subervi (Guatemala) Christopher Díaz Figueroa	(Argentina) Facundo Mena (Colombia) Felipe Mantilla (Dominican Republic) Peter Bertran (Canada) Alejandro Tabilo
June 13	Colombia F1 Futures; Cartagena, Colombia; Hard $10,000; Singles and doubles draws	(Argentina) Facundo Mena (Chile) Jorge Montero; 6–4, 7–6^{(7–5)}	(Colombia) José Daniel Bendeck (Colombia) Nicolás Mejía	(Dominican Republic) Roberto Cid Subervi (Guatemala) Christopher Díaz Figueroa	(Argentina) Facundo Mena (Colombia) Felipe Mantilla (Dominican Republic) Peter Bertran (Canada) Alejandro Tabilo
June 13	France F10 Futures; Mont-de-Marsan, France; Clay $10,000; Singles and doubles draws	(France) Maxime Hamou; 6–4, 7–5	(France) Grégoire Jacq	(Monaco) Romain Arneodo (France) Alexandre Müller	(Australia) Nicholas Horton (Spain) Marcos Giraldi Requena (France) Alexis Musialek (Morocco) Lamine Ouahab
June 13	France F10 Futures; Mont-de-Marsan, France; Clay $10,000; Singles and doubles draws	(France) Benjamin Bonzi (France) Grégoire Jacq; 7–6^{(7–4)}, 7–6^{(13–11)}	(Monaco) Romain Arneodo (Monaco) Benjamin Balleret	(Monaco) Romain Arneodo (France) Alexandre Müller	(Australia) Nicholas Horton (Spain) Marcos Giraldi Requena (France) Alexis Musialek (Morocco) Lamine Ouahab
June 13	Hong Kong F2 Futures; Hong Kong, China; Hard $10,000; Singles and doubles draws	(Australia) Andrew Whittington; 6–3, 6–0	(Australia) Daniel Nolan	(China) He Yecong (China) Gao Xin	(China) Wang Chuhan (Latvia) Miķelis Lībietis (Indonesia) Christopher Rungkat (Australia) Dayne Kelly
June 13	Hong Kong F2 Futures; Hong Kong, China; Hard $10,000; Singles and doubles draws	(China) Ning Yuqing (China) Wang Chuhan; 6–7^{(2–7)}, 7–6^{(7–5)}, [10–8]	(Estonia) Markus Kerner (Latvia) Miķelis Lībietis	(China) He Yecong (China) Gao Xin	(China) Wang Chuhan (Latvia) Miķelis Lībietis (Indonesia) Christopher Rungkat (Australia) Dayne Kelly
June 13	Italy F15 Futures; Sassuolo, Italy; Clay $10,000; Singles and doubles draws	(Croatia) Kristijan Mesaroš; 6–1, 6–2	(Germany) Pascal Meis	(Sweden) Markus Eriksson (Italy) Walter Trusendi	(Italy) Omar Giacalone (Italy) Francesco Picco (Italy) Jacopo Stefanini (Portugal) João Domingues
June 13	Italy F15 Futures; Sassuolo, Italy; Clay $10,000; Singles and doubles draws	(Sweden) Markus Eriksson (Sweden) Milos Sekulic; 6–4, 6–3	(Italy) Filippo Baldi (Italy) Pietro Licciardi	(Sweden) Markus Eriksson (Italy) Walter Trusendi	(Italy) Omar Giacalone (Italy) Francesco Picco (Italy) Jacopo Stefanini (Portugal) João Domingues
June 13	Japan F8 Futures; Akishima, Japan; Carpet $10,000; Singles and doubles draws	(Japan) Gengo Kikuchi; 4–6, 7–6^{(10–8)}, 6–0	(Japan) Yusuke Watanuki	(Japan) Yuki Mochizuki (Japan) Renta Tokuda	(Japan) Yuya Kibi (Japan) Sho Katayama (Japan) Sho Shimabukuro (Japan) Kaito Uesugi
June 13	Japan F8 Futures; Akishima, Japan; Carpet $10,000; Singles and doubles draws	(Japan) Katsuki Nagao (Japan) Hiromasa Oku; 6–4, 6–2	(Japan) Yuichi Ito (Japan) Kaito Uesugi	(Japan) Yuki Mochizuki (Japan) Renta Tokuda	(Japan) Yuya Kibi (Japan) Sho Katayama (Japan) Sho Shimabukuro (Japan) Kaito Uesugi
June 13	Mozambique F2 Futures; Maputo, Mozambique; Hard $10,000; Singles and doubles draws	(Australia) Marc Polmans; 6–1, 6–1	(Australia) Jeremy Beale	(South Africa) Lloyd Harris (South Africa) Tucker Vorster	(United States) John Lamble (Argentina) Matías Franco Descotte (United States) Mitchell Frank (Tunisia) Mohamed Aziz Dougaz
June 13	Mozambique F2 Futures; Maputo, Mozambique; Hard $10,000; Singles and doubles draws	(Zimbabwe) Benjamin Lock (Zimbabwe) Courtney John Lock; 6–4, 6–3	(United States) John Lamble (Portugal) Bernardo Saraiva	(South Africa) Lloyd Harris (South Africa) Tucker Vorster	(United States) John Lamble (Argentina) Matías Franco Descotte (United States) Mitchell Frank (Tunisia) Mohamed Aziz Dougaz
June 13	Netherlands F1 Futures; Alkmaar, Netherlands; Clay $10,000; Singles and doubles draws	(Portugal) Pedro Sousa; 3–6, 7–5, 6–3	(Brazil) José Pereira	(Switzerland) Yann Marti (Netherlands) Tallon Griekspoor	(Austria) Maximilian Neuchrist (United States) Connor Smith (Netherlands) Tim van Rijthoven (Netherlands) Lennert van der Linden
June 13	Netherlands F1 Futures; Alkmaar, Netherlands; Clay $10,000; Singles and doubles draws	(Netherlands) Tallon Griekspoor (Netherlands) Tim van Rijthoven; 7–6^{(7–3)}, 6–7^{(3–7)}, [10–8]	(Philippines) Ruben Gonzales (United States) Connor Smith	(Switzerland) Yann Marti (Netherlands) Tallon Griekspoor	(Austria) Maximilian Neuchrist (United States) Connor Smith (Netherlands) Tim van Rijthoven (Netherlands) Lennert van der Linden
June 13	Poland F4 Futures; Warsaw, Poland; Clay $10,000; Singles and doubles draws	(Hungary) Péter Nagy; 6–4, 0–6, 6–4	(Poland) Marcin Gawron	(Italy) Antonio Massara (Poland) Grzegorz Panfil	(Czech Republic) David Poljak (France) Gabriel Petit (Finland) Patrik Niklas-Salminen (Spain) Pol Toledo Bagué
June 13	Poland F4 Futures; Warsaw, Poland; Clay $10,000; Singles and doubles draws	(Poland) Marcin Gawron (Poland) Grzegorz Panfil; 6–4, 6–3	(Russia) Alexander Igoshin (Russia) Alexander Zhurbin	(Italy) Antonio Massara (Poland) Grzegorz Panfil	(Czech Republic) David Poljak (France) Gabriel Petit (Finland) Patrik Niklas-Salminen (Spain) Pol Toledo Bagué
June 13	Romania F6 Futures; Buzău, Romania; Clay $10,000; Singles and doubles draws	(Uruguay) Martín Cuevas; 6–0, 6–3	(Romania) Petru-Alexandru Luncanu	(Romania) Vasile Antonescu (Portugal) André Gaspar Murta	(Switzerland) Antoine Bellier (Spain) Albert Alcaraz Ivorra (Romania) Alexandru Jecan (Romania) Victor Crivoi
June 13	Romania F6 Futures; Buzău, Romania; Clay $10,000; Singles and doubles draws	(Spain) Albert Alcaraz Ivorra (Chile) Cristóbal Saavedra; 7–5, 6–3	(Uruguay) Martín Cuevas (Uruguay) Santiago Maresca	(Romania) Vasile Antonescu (Portugal) André Gaspar Murta	(Switzerland) Antoine Bellier (Spain) Albert Alcaraz Ivorra (Romania) Alexandru Jecan (Romania) Victor Crivoi
June 13	Span F17 Futures; Martos, Spain; Hard $10,000; Singles and doubles draws	(Denmark) Frederik Nielsen; 6–4, 6–3	(France) Rémi Boutillier	(Spain) Mario Vilella Martínez (Spain) Ricardo Ojeda Lara	(Spain) Pablo Vivero González (Italy) Erik Crepaldi (Spain) Miguel Semmler (Spain) Alejandro Davidovich Fokina
June 13	Span F17 Futures; Martos, Spain; Hard $10,000; Singles and doubles draws	(France) Rémi Boutillier (France) Mick Lescure; 6–7^{(3–7)}, 6–4, [10–5]	(Spain) Jaume Pla Malfeito (Spain) Mario Vilella Martínez	(Spain) Mario Vilella Martínez (Spain) Ricardo Ojeda Lara	(Spain) Pablo Vivero González (Italy) Erik Crepaldi (Spain) Miguel Semmler (Spain) Alejandro Davidovich Fokina
June 13	Turkey F24 Futures; Antalya, Turkey; Hard $10,000; Singles and doubles draws	(Italy) Riccardo Bellotti; 0–6, 6–1, 6–4	(Germany) Marc Sieber	(Turkey) Altuğ Çelikbilek (Switzerland) Siméon Rossier	(Argentina) Nicolás Alberto Arreche (Turkey) Cem İlkel (Turkey) Sarp Ağabigün (Turkey) Anıl Yüksel
June 13	Turkey F24 Futures; Antalya, Turkey; Hard $10,000; Singles and doubles draws	(Argentina) Franco Agamenone (Argentina) Nicolás Alberto Arreche; 7–6^{(7–5)}, 6–7^{(3–7)}, [13–11]	(Turkey) Cem İlkel (Australia) Goran Marijan	(Turkey) Altuğ Çelikbilek (Switzerland) Siméon Rossier	(Argentina) Nicolás Alberto Arreche (Turkey) Cem İlkel (Turkey) Sarp Ağabigün (Turkey) Anıl Yüksel
June 13	United States F19 Futures; Buffalo, United States; Clay $10,000; Singles and doubles draws	(United States) Evan King; 7–6^{(7–4)}, 6–3	(Australia) Gavin van Peperzeel	(Denmark) Mikael Torpegaard (Mexico) Tigre Hank	(Mexico) Hans Hach Verdugo (United Kingdom) Farris Fathi Gosea (United States) Nathan Pasha (United States) Winston Lin
June 13	United States F19 Futures; Buffalo, United States; Clay $10,000; Singles and doubles draws	(Mexico) Hans Hach Verdugo (Japan) Kaichi Uchida; 6–2, 6–3	(United Kingdom) Farris Fathi Gosea (United States) Tim Kopinski	(Denmark) Mikael Torpegaard (Mexico) Tigre Hank	(Mexico) Hans Hach Verdugo (United Kingdom) Farris Fathi Gosea (United States) Nathan Pasha (United States) Winston Lin
June 20	Canada F3 Futures; Richmond, Canada; Hard $25,000; Singles and doubles draws	(Canada) Peter Polansky; 6–1, 6–4	(Chinese Taipei) Jason Jung	(New Zealand) Finn Tearney (United States) Raymond Sarmiento	(United States) Alexios Halebian (Canada) Filip Peliwo (United Kingdom) Farris Fathi Gosea (Canada) Philip Bester
June 20	Canada F3 Futures; Richmond, Canada; Hard $25,000; Singles and doubles draws	(Canada) Philip Bester (Canada) Peter Polansky; 7–6^{(7–2)}, 6–2	(United Kingdom) Farris Fathi Gosea (United States) Tim Kopinski	(New Zealand) Finn Tearney (United States) Raymond Sarmiento	(United States) Alexios Halebian (Canada) Filip Peliwo (United Kingdom) Farris Fathi Gosea (Canada) Philip Bester
June 20	France F11 Futures; Toulon, France; Clay $25,000; Singles and doubles draws	(Morocco) Lamine Ouahab; 6–3, 7–6^{(7–3)}	(France) Laurent Lokoli	(France) Tak Khunn Wang (France) Maxime Hamou	(France) Maxime Chazal (Monaco) Romain Arneodo (Monaco) Benjamin Balleret (Spain) Álvaro López San Martín
June 20	France F11 Futures; Toulon, France; Clay $25,000; Singles and doubles draws	(Spain) Pedro Martínez (Morocco) Lamine Ouahab; 6–3, 6–7^{(4–7)}, [12–10]	(France) Ronan Joncour (France) Yanaïs Laurent	(France) Tak Khunn Wang (France) Maxime Hamou	(France) Maxime Chazal (Monaco) Romain Arneodo (Monaco) Benjamin Balleret (Spain) Álvaro López San Martín
June 20	Netherlands F2 Futures; Breda, Netherlands; Clay $25,000+H; Singles and doubles draws	(Belgium) Joris De Loore; 6–2, 6–2	(Germany) Daniel Masur	(Netherlands) Tim van Rijthoven (Netherlands) Botic van de Zandschulp	(Netherlands) Tallon Griekspoor (Russia) Alexey Vatutin (Germany) Peter Torebko (Poland) Kamil Majchrzak
June 20	Netherlands F2 Futures; Breda, Netherlands; Clay $25,000+H; Singles and doubles draws	(Bosnia and Herzegovina) Tomislav Brkić (Poland) Kamil Majchrzak; 6–0, 6–2	(Egypt) Karim-Mohamed Maamoun (Serbia) Ilija Vučić	(Netherlands) Tim van Rijthoven (Netherlands) Botic van de Zandschulp	(Netherlands) Tallon Griekspoor (Russia) Alexey Vatutin (Germany) Peter Torebko (Poland) Kamil Majchrzak
June 20	Spain F18 Futures; Palma del Río, Spain; Hard $25,000+H; Singles and doubles draws	(Japan) Akira Santillan; 7–5, 6–3	(France) Rémi Boutillier	(Spain) Pablo Vivero González (Portugal) Fred Gil	(Israel) Yishai Oliel (Spain) Ricardo Ojeda Lara (Spain) Roberto Ortega Olmedo (Republic of Ireland) Sam Barry
June 20	Spain F18 Futures; Palma del Río, Spain; Hard $25,000+H; Singles and doubles draws	(Denmark) Frederik Nielsen (Republic of Ireland) David O'Hare; 6–4, 6–2	(Colombia) Nicolás Barrientos (Spain) Jaume Pla Malfeito	(Spain) Pablo Vivero González (Portugal) Fred Gil	(Israel) Yishai Oliel (Spain) Ricardo Ojeda Lara (Spain) Roberto Ortega Olmedo (Republic of Ireland) Sam Barry
June 20	United States F21 Futures; Tulsa, United States; Hard $25,000; Singles and doubles draws	(United Kingdom) Cameron Norrie; 6–1, 6–1	(United States) Ryan Haviland	(United States) Tennys Sandgren (United States) Paul Oosterbaan	(United States) Mitchell Krueger (Germany) Dominik Köpfer (United States) Michael Mmoh (United States) Adam El Mihdawy
June 20	United States F21 Futures; Tulsa, United States; Hard $25,000; Singles and doubles draws	(United States) Nathaniel Lammons (United States) Dane Webb; 7–5, 4–6, [12–10]	(South Africa) Rikus De Villiers (United States) Clay Thompson	(United States) Tennys Sandgren (United States) Paul Oosterbaan	(United States) Mitchell Krueger (Germany) Dominik Köpfer (United States) Michael Mmoh (United States) Adam El Mihdawy
June 20	Belgium F2 Futures; Havré, Belgium; Clay $10,000; Singles and doubles draws	(Germany) Daniel Altmaier; 6–2, 6–2	(Belgium) Maxime Authom	(Germany) Marvin Netuschil (Belgium) Clément Geens	(Belgium) Jolan Cailleau (Belgium) Joran Vliegen (Belgium) Romain Barbosa (Germany) Pascal Meis
June 20	Belgium F2 Futures; Havré, Belgium; Clay $10,000; Singles and doubles draws	(Belgium) Sander Gillé (Belgium) Joran Vliegen; 6–2, 6–4	(Australia) Adam Taylor (Australia) Jason Taylor	(Germany) Marvin Netuschil (Belgium) Clément Geens	(Belgium) Jolan Cailleau (Belgium) Joran Vliegen (Belgium) Romain Barbosa (Germany) Pascal Meis
June 20	Colombia F2 Futures; Barranquilla, Colombia; Clay $10,000; Singles and doubles draws	(Dominican Republic) Roberto Cid Subervi; 6–1, 6–2	(Argentina) Facundo Mena	(Argentina) Gonzalo Villanueva (Argentina) Federico Coria	(Argentina) Matías Zukas (Peru) Mauricio Echazú (Colombia) Juan Sebastián Gómez (Ecuador) Roberto Quiroz
June 20	Colombia F2 Futures; Barranquilla, Colombia; Clay $10,000; Singles and doubles draws	(Mexico) Luis Patiño (Ecuador) Roberto Quiroz; 6–4, 7–6^{(9–7)}	(Guatemala) Christopher Díaz Figueroa (Guatemala) Wilfredo González	(Argentina) Gonzalo Villanueva (Argentina) Federico Coria	(Argentina) Matías Zukas (Peru) Mauricio Echazú (Colombia) Juan Sebastián Gómez (Ecuador) Roberto Quiroz
June 20	Macedonia F1 Futures; Skopje, FYR Macedonia; Clay $10,000; Singles and doubles draws	(Serbia) Danilo Petrović; 6–3, 4–6, 7–6^{(8–6)}	(France) Alexandre Müller	(Italy) Claudio Fortuna (Austria) Lenny Hampel	(Slovakia) Patrik Fabian (Bulgaria) Alexander Lazov (India) Sasikumar Mukund (Australia) Christopher O'Connell
June 20	Macedonia F1 Futures; Skopje, FYR Macedonia; Clay $10,000; Singles and doubles draws	(North Macedonia) Tomislav Jotovski (Bulgaria) Alexander Lazov; 6–3, 6–2	(Serbia) Nebojša Perić (Serbia) Danilo Petrović	(Italy) Claudio Fortuna (Austria) Lenny Hampel	(Slovakia) Patrik Fabian (Bulgaria) Alexander Lazov (India) Sasikumar Mukund (Australia) Christopher O'Connell
June 20	Germany F4 Futures; Kaltenkirchen, Germany; Clay $10,000; Singles and doubles draws	(France) Grégoire Jacq; 3–6, 3–2, ret.	(Germany) Yannick Maden	(Germany) Jonas Lütjen (Germany) Kevin Krawietz	(Hungary) Gábor Borsos (Germany) Florian Fallert (Slovenia) Nik Razboršek (Spain) Pol Toledo Bagué
June 20	Germany F4 Futures; Kaltenkirchen, Germany; Clay $10,000; Singles and doubles draws	(Hungary) Gábor Borsos (Hungary) Ádám Kellner; 7–6^{(11–9)}, 6–4	(Germany) Jonas Lütjen (Germany) Timon Reichelt	(Germany) Jonas Lütjen (Germany) Kevin Krawietz	(Hungary) Gábor Borsos (Germany) Florian Fallert (Slovenia) Nik Razboršek (Spain) Pol Toledo Bagué
June 20	Hong Kong F3 Futures; Hong Kong, China; Hard $10,000; Singles and doubles draws	(Australia) Andrew Whittington; 6–3, 6–2	(Japan) Jumpei Yamasaki	(Germany) Sami Reinwein (Australia) Jake Delaney	(China) Ouyang Bowen (Japan) Arata Onozawa (China) He Yecong (China) Qi Xi
June 20	Hong Kong F3 Futures; Hong Kong, China; Hard $10,000; Singles and doubles draws	(Japan) Shintaro Imai (Japan) Arata Onozawa; 6–4, 4–6, [10–5]	(Chinese Taipei) Hung Jui-chen (Chinese Taipei) Wang Chieh-fu	(Germany) Sami Reinwein (Australia) Jake Delaney	(China) Ouyang Bowen (Japan) Arata Onozawa (China) He Yecong (China) Qi Xi
June 20	Italy F16 Futures; Basilicanova, Italy; Clay $10,000+H; Singles and doubles draws	(Italy) Lorenzo Giustino; 6–4, 6–4	(Italy) Walter Trusendi	(Italy) Riccardo Bonadio (Argentina) Hernán Casanova	(Serbia) Miki Janković (Portugal) Pedro Sousa (Italy) Jacopo Stefanini (Sweden) Markus Eriksson
June 20	Italy F16 Futures; Basilicanova, Italy; Clay $10,000+H; Singles and doubles draws	(Uruguay) Marcel Felder (Argentina) Patricio Heras; 6–4, 6–3	(Brazil) Eduardo Dischinger (Portugal) João Domingues	(Italy) Riccardo Bonadio (Argentina) Hernán Casanova	(Serbia) Miki Janković (Portugal) Pedro Sousa (Italy) Jacopo Stefanini (Sweden) Markus Eriksson
June 20	Korea F2 Futures; Sangju, Korea; Hard $10,000; Singles and doubles draws	(South Korea) Noh Sang-woo; 6–4, 6–1	(South Korea) Nam Ji-sung	(South Korea) Kim Cheong-eui (South Korea) Hong Seong-chan	(South Korea) Cho Min-hyeok (South Korea) Nam Hyun-woo (South Korea) Kim Young-seok (South Korea) Chung Yun-seong
June 20	Korea F2 Futures; Sangju, Korea; Hard $10,000; Singles and doubles draws	(South Korea) Nam Ji-sung (South Korea) Song Min-kyu; 6–4, 6–4	(South Korea) Chung Yun-seong (South Korea) Lim Yong-kyu	(South Korea) Kim Cheong-eui (South Korea) Hong Seong-chan	(South Korea) Cho Min-hyeok (South Korea) Nam Hyun-woo (South Korea) Kim Young-seok (South Korea) Chung Yun-seong
June 20	Romania F7 Futures; Bucharest, Romania; Clay $10,000; Singles and doubles draws	(Spain) Carlos Taberner; 6–1, 5–7, 6–4	(Argentina) Mariano Kestelboim	(Romania) Petru-Alexandru Luncanu (Uruguay) Martín Cuevas	(Romania) Alexandru Jecan (Spain) Miguel Semmler (Ukraine) Vladyslav Manafov (Romania) Dragoș Dima
June 20	Romania F7 Futures; Bucharest, Romania; Clay $10,000; Singles and doubles draws	(Ukraine) Vladyslav Manafov (Argentina) Juan Pablo Paz; 4–6, 7–5, [10–4]	(Argentina) Mariano Kestelboim (Romania) Petru-Alexandru Luncanu	(Romania) Petru-Alexandru Luncanu (Uruguay) Martín Cuevas	(Romania) Alexandru Jecan (Spain) Miguel Semmler (Ukraine) Vladyslav Manafov (Romania) Dragoș Dima
June 20	Russia F1 Futures; Moscow, Russia; Clay $10,000; Singles and doubles draws	(Russia) Alexander Bublik; 6–3, 7–6^{(7–5)}	(Slovakia) Filip Horanský	(Russia) Evgeny Tyurnev (Spain) Marc Giner	(Russia) Anton Zaitcev (Russia) Evgeny Karlovskiy (Russia) Mikhail Fufygin (Russia) Alexander Vasilenko
June 20	Russia F1 Futures; Moscow, Russia; Clay $10,000; Singles and doubles draws	(Russia) Evgeny Karlovskiy (Russia) Denis Matsukevich; 6–2, 6–3	(Ukraine) Oleksandr Bielinskyi (Russia) Mikhail Fufygin	(Russia) Evgeny Tyurnev (Spain) Marc Giner	(Russia) Anton Zaitcev (Russia) Evgeny Karlovskiy (Russia) Mikhail Fufygin (Russia) Alexander Vasilenko
June 20	Turkey F25 Futures; Marmaris, Turkey; Hard $10,000; Singles and doubles draws	(Italy) Riccardo Bellotti; 7–5, 7–5	(Turkey) Cem İlkel	(Turkey) Anıl Yüksel (France) Hugo Voljacques	(Turkey) Altuğ Çelikbilek (Brazil) Fabiano de Paula (Cyprus) Michail Pervolarakis (Argentina) Franco Agamenone
June 20	Turkey F25 Futures; Marmaris, Turkey; Hard $10,000; Singles and doubles draws	(Turkey) Tuna Altuna (Turkey) Cem İlkel; 7–5, 6–3	(Bolivia) Hugo Dellien (Bolivia) Federico Zeballos	(Turkey) Anıl Yüksel (France) Hugo Voljacques	(Turkey) Altuğ Çelikbilek (Brazil) Fabiano de Paula (Cyprus) Michail Pervolarakis (Argentina) Franco Agamenone
June 20	United States F20 Futures; Rochester, United States; Clay $10,000; Singles and doubles draws	(Japan) Kaichi Uchida; 6–4, 6–4	(Colombia) Juan Manuel Benítez Chavarriaga	(Denmark) Mikael Torpegaard (United States) Thai-Son Kwiatkowski	(Australia) Gavin van Peperzeel (United States) Julian Zlobinsky (United States) Marcus Fugate (United States) Nathan Pasha
June 20	United States F20 Futures; Rochester, United States; Clay $10,000; Singles and doubles draws	(Mexico) Hans Hach Verdugo (Australia) Gavin van Peperzeel; 7–6^{(7–5)}, 6–2	(South Africa) Damon Gooch (Japan) Kaichi Uchida	(Denmark) Mikael Torpegaard (United States) Thai-Son Kwiatkowski	(Australia) Gavin van Peperzeel (United States) Julian Zlobinsky (United States) Marcus Fugate (United States) Nathan Pasha
June 20	Zimbabwe F1 Futures; Harare, Zimbabwe; Hard $10,000; Singles and doubles draws	(Zimbabwe) Benjamin Lock; 5–7, 7–6^{(7–5)}, 7–5	(Australia) Marc Polmans	(United States) Michael Grant (France) Hugo Nys	(South Africa) Lloyd Harris (France) Baptiste Crepatte (United States) Mitchell Frank (South Africa) Nicolaas Scholtz
June 20	Zimbabwe F1 Futures; Harare, Zimbabwe; Hard $10,000; Singles and doubles draws	(France) Hugo Nys (Italy) Andrea Vavassori; 6–3, 6–3	(Zimbabwe) Benjamin Lock (Zimbabwe) Courtney John Lock	(United States) Michael Grant (France) Hugo Nys	(South Africa) Lloyd Harris (France) Baptiste Crepatte (United States) Mitchell Frank (South Africa) Nicolaas Scholtz
June 27	Canada F4 Futures; Kelowna, Canada; Hard $25,000; Singles and doubles draws	(Canada) Peter Polansky; 6–2, 6–4	(United States) Raymond Sarmiento	(France) Sébastien Boltz (Australia) Blake Mott	(Canada) Riaan du Toit (Canada) Philip Bester (United States) Alexios Halebian (Chinese Taipei) Jason Jung
June 27	Canada F4 Futures; Kelowna, Canada; Hard $25,000; Singles and doubles draws	(United States) John Paul Fruttero (Chinese Taipei) Jason Jung; 6–4, 7–6^{(7–4)}	(Australia) Jarryd Chaplin (Australia) Benjamin Mitchell	(France) Sébastien Boltz (Australia) Blake Mott	(Canada) Riaan du Toit (Canada) Philip Bester (United States) Alexios Halebian (Chinese Taipei) Jason Jung
June 27	China F10 Futures; Longyan, China; Hard $25,000; Singles and doubles draws	(South Korea) Lee Duck-hee; 6–4, 6–4	(China) Li Zhe	(China) Wu Di (China) Bai Yan	(Indonesia) Christopher Rungkat (Japan) Masato Shiga (China) Gong Xiao (China) He Yecong
June 27	China F10 Futures; Longyan, China; Hard $25,000; Singles and doubles draws	(China) Bai Yan (China) Li Zhe; 7–6^{(7–1)}, 6–4	(China) Sun Fajing (China) Wang Aoran	(China) Wu Di (China) Bai Yan	(Indonesia) Christopher Rungkat (Japan) Masato Shiga (China) Gong Xiao (China) He Yecong
June 27	Czech Republic F4 Futures; Pardubice, Czech Republic; Clay $25,000; Singles and doubles draws	(Brazil) Orlando Luz; 6–2, 6–2	(Germany) Peter Torebko	(Czech Republic) Zdeněk Kolář (Portugal) Frederico Ferreira Silva	(Czech Republic) Jan Mertl (Croatia) Ante Pavić (Czech Republic) Petr Michnev (Belarus) Uladzimir Ignatik
June 27	Czech Republic F4 Futures; Pardubice, Czech Republic; Clay $25,000; Singles and doubles draws	(Czech Republic) Jan Hernych (Czech Republic) Zdeněk Kolář; 6–1, 6–4	(Czech Republic) Roman Jebavý (Czech Republic) David Novák	(Czech Republic) Zdeněk Kolář (Portugal) Frederico Ferreira Silva	(Czech Republic) Jan Mertl (Croatia) Ante Pavić (Czech Republic) Petr Michnev (Belarus) Uladzimir Ignatik
June 27	France F12 Futures; Montauban, France; Clay $25,000+H; Singles and doubles draws	(Spain) Jordi Samper-Montaña; 7–6^{(8–6)}, 6–7^{(6–8)}, 6–2	(France) Constant Lestienne	(France) Laurent Lokoli (Brazil) Caio Zampieri	(Spain) Pedro Martínez (France) Jonathan Eysseric (France) Florent Diep (France) Maxime Teixeira
June 27	France F12 Futures; Montauban, France; Clay $25,000+H; Singles and doubles draws	(Bosnia and Herzegovina) Tomislav Brkić (Brazil) Caio Zampieri; 6–1, 6–2	(Spain) Pedro Martínez (Morocco) Lamine Ouahab	(France) Laurent Lokoli (Brazil) Caio Zampieri	(Spain) Pedro Martínez (France) Jonathan Eysseric (France) Florent Diep (France) Maxime Teixeira
June 27	United States F23 Futures; Wichita, United States; Hard $25,000; Singles and doubles draws	(United Kingdom) Cameron Norrie; 6–3, 6–3	(United States) Jared Hiltzik	(United States) Sekou Bangoura (Germany) Dominik Köpfer	(United States) Tommy Paul (United States) Clay Thompson (United States) Ryan Haviland (Zimbabwe) Takanyi Garanganga
June 27	United States F23 Futures; Wichita, United States; Hard $25,000; Singles and doubles draws	(United States) Sekou Bangoura (Barbados) Darian King; 6–2, 6–3	(United States) Nicolas Meister (United States) Eric Quigley	(United States) Sekou Bangoura (Germany) Dominik Köpfer	(United States) Tommy Paul (United States) Clay Thompson (United States) Ryan Haviland (Zimbabwe) Takanyi Garanganga
June 27	Belgium F3 Futures; Nieuwpoort, Belgium; Clay $10,000; Singles and doubles draws	(Netherlands) Lennert van der Linden; 6–0, 6–1	(Belgium) Jonas Merckx	(Slovakia) Filip Horanský (Belgium) Omar Salman	(Belgium) Joran Vliegen (Mexico) Eduardo Peralta-Tello (Netherlands) Colin van Beem (Belgium) Jeroen Vanneste
June 27	Belgium F3 Futures; Nieuwpoort, Belgium; Clay $10,000; Singles and doubles draws	(Belgium) Sander Gillé (Belgium) Joran Vliegen; 6–2, 6–3	(Belgium) Stijn Meulemans (Belgium) Laurens Verboven	(Slovakia) Filip Horanský (Belgium) Omar Salman	(Belgium) Joran Vliegen (Mexico) Eduardo Peralta-Tello (Netherlands) Colin van Beem (Belgium) Jeroen Vanneste
June 27	Brazil F1 Futures; Piracicaba, Brazil; Clay $10,000; Singles and doubles draws	(Brazil) Daniel Dutra da Silva; 7–5, 6–3	(Brazil) Bruno Sant'Anna	(Brazil) Ricardo Hocevar (Brazil) Thales Turini	(Brazil) Carlos Eduardo Severino (Argentina) Gabriel Alejandro Hidalgo (Brazil) Oscar José Gutierrez (Brazil) Wilson Leite
June 27	Brazil F1 Futures; Piracicaba, Brazil; Clay $10,000; Singles and doubles draws	(Brazil) Igor Marcondes (Brazil) Rafael Matos; 7–5, 2–6, [10–6]	(Brazil) Daniel Dutra da Silva (Brazil) Eduardo Russi Assumpção	(Brazil) Ricardo Hocevar (Brazil) Thales Turini	(Brazil) Carlos Eduardo Severino (Argentina) Gabriel Alejandro Hidalgo (Brazil) Oscar José Gutierrez (Brazil) Wilson Leite
June 27	Colombia F3 Futures; Cali, Colombia; Clay $10,000; Singles and doubles draws	(Ecuador) Roberto Quiroz; 6–3, 6–1	(Argentina) Gonzalo Villanueva	(Chile) Marcelo Tomás Barrios Vera (Peru) Juan Pablo Varillas	(Colombia) Cristian Rodríguez (Guatemala) Christopher Díaz Figueroa (Colombia) Juan Sebastián Gómez (Argentina) Gaston-Arturo Grimolizzi
June 27	Colombia F3 Futures; Cali, Colombia; Clay $10,000; Singles and doubles draws	(Mexico) Luis Patiño (Ecuador) Roberto Quiroz; 6–1, 3–6, [10–7]	(Colombia) Juan Sebastián Gómez (Colombia) Cristian Rodríguez	(Chile) Marcelo Tomás Barrios Vera (Peru) Juan Pablo Varillas	(Colombia) Cristian Rodríguez (Guatemala) Christopher Díaz Figueroa (Colombia) Juan Sebastián Gómez (Argentina) Gaston-Arturo Grimolizzi
June 27	Egypt F13 Futures; Sharm el-Sheikh, Egypt; Hard $10,000; Singles and doubles draws	(Bosnia and Herzegovina) Aldin Šetkić; 7–5, 6–4	(Italy) Alessandro Bega	(Spain) Roberto Ortega Olmedo (United Kingdom) Keelan Oakley	(Italy) Lorenzo Frigerio (France) Lény Mitjana (Egypt) Issam Haitham Taweel (Italy) Luca Pancaldi
June 27	Egypt F13 Futures; Sharm el-Sheikh, Egypt; Hard $10,000; Singles and doubles draws	(United States) Jarmere Jenkins (United States) Anderson Reed; 6–3, 6–3	(Italy) Alessandro Bega (Italy) Francesco Vilardo	(Spain) Roberto Ortega Olmedo (United Kingdom) Keelan Oakley	(Italy) Lorenzo Frigerio (France) Lény Mitjana (Egypt) Issam Haitham Taweel (Italy) Luca Pancaldi
June 27	Macedonia F2 Futures; Skopje, FYR Macedonia; Clay $10,000; Singles and doubles draws	(France) Alexandre Müller; 6–2, 6–4	(North Macedonia) Dimitar Grabul	(Croatia) Kristijan Mesaroš (Bulgaria) Alexander Lazov	(Australia) Christopher O'Connell (North Macedonia) Tomislav Jotovski (Italy) Claudio Fortuna (United Kingdom) Richard Gabb
June 27	Macedonia F2 Futures; Skopje, FYR Macedonia; Clay $10,000; Singles and doubles draws	(North Macedonia) Tomislav Jotovski (Bulgaria) Alexander Lazov; 6–2, 3–6, [10–6]	(Czech Republic) Libor Salaba (Croatia) Nino Serdarušić	(Croatia) Kristijan Mesaroš (Bulgaria) Alexander Lazov	(Australia) Christopher O'Connell (North Macedonia) Tomislav Jotovski (Italy) Claudio Fortuna (United Kingdom) Richard Gabb
June 27	Germany F5 Futures; Kamen, Germany; Clay $10,000; Singles and doubles draws	(Belgium) Christopher Heyman; 6–7^{(3–7)}, 6–2, 7–6^{(8–6)}	(France) Antoine Hoang	(Germany) Marc Sieber (Poland) Marcin Gawron	(Germany) Johannes Härteis (Germany) Sebastian Prechtel (Germany) Pascal Meis (Germany) Jonas Lütjen
June 27	Germany F5 Futures; Kamen, Germany; Clay $10,000; Singles and doubles draws	(Germany) Johannes Härteis (Germany) Hannes Wagner; 7–6^{(8–6)}, 2–6, [10–6]	(Australia) Bradley Mousley (Australia) Scott Puodziunas	(Germany) Marc Sieber (Poland) Marcin Gawron	(Germany) Johannes Härteis (Germany) Sebastian Prechtel (Germany) Pascal Meis (Germany) Jonas Lütjen
June 27	Italy F18 Futures; Albinea, Italy; Clay $10,000; Singles and doubles draws	(Italy) Walter Trusendi; 7–5, 6–2	(Italy) Francesco Picco	(Italy) Antonio Massara (Italy) Adelchi Virgili	(Chile) Cristóbal Saavedra (Italy) Daniele Capecchi (Italy) Davide Galoppini (Brazil) Eduardo Dischinger
June 27	Italy F18 Futures; Albinea, Italy; Clay $10,000; Singles and doubles draws	(Italy) Andrea Basso (Italy) Francesco Moncagatto; 7–6^{(7–4)}, 6–3	(Italy) Federico Maccari (Portugal) Gonçalo Oliveira	(Italy) Antonio Massara (Italy) Adelchi Virgili	(Chile) Cristóbal Saavedra (Italy) Daniele Capecchi (Italy) Davide Galoppini (Brazil) Eduardo Dischinger
June 27	Korea F3 Futures; Gimcheon, Korea; Hard $10,000; Singles and doubles draws	(South Korea) Song Min-kyu; 6–3, 6–2	(South Korea) Son Ji-hoon	(Chinese Taipei) Huang Liang-chi (Australia) Max Purcell	(Japan) Yusuke Takahashi (South Korea) Moon Ju-hae (South Korea) Chung Hong (South Korea) Nam Hyun-woo
June 27	Korea F3 Futures; Gimcheon, Korea; Hard $10,000; Singles and doubles draws	(South Korea) Kim Cheong-eui (South Korea) Noh Sang-woo; 3–6, 7–6^{(8–6)}, [10–7]	(South Korea) Jeong Young-hoon (South Korea) Seol Jae-min	(Chinese Taipei) Huang Liang-chi (Australia) Max Purcell	(Japan) Yusuke Takahashi (South Korea) Moon Ju-hae (South Korea) Chung Hong (South Korea) Nam Hyun-woo
June 27	Netherlands F3 Futures; Middelburg, Netherlands; Clay $10,000; Singles and doubles draws	(Netherlands) Jesse Huta Galung; 6–3, 6–2	(Netherlands) Jelle Sels	(Netherlands) Tallon Griekspoor (Belgium) Maxime Authom	(Georgia (country)) Aleksandre Metreveli (Germany) Jan Choinski (Germany) George von Massow (Brazil) José Pereira
June 27	Netherlands F3 Futures; Middelburg, Netherlands; Clay $10,000; Singles and doubles draws	(Netherlands) Tallon Griekspoor (Netherlands) Tim van Rijthoven; 6–2, 6–4	(Netherlands) Bobbie de Goeijen (France) Yanaïs Laurent	(Netherlands) Tallon Griekspoor (Belgium) Maxime Authom	(Georgia (country)) Aleksandre Metreveli (Germany) Jan Choinski (Germany) George von Massow (Brazil) José Pereira
June 27	Romania F8 Futures; Curtea de Argeș, Romania; Clay $10,000; Singles and doubles draws	(Netherlands) Miliaan Niesten; 6–1, 6–3	(Romania) Dragoș Dima	(Argentina) Juan Pablo Paz (France) Jordan Ubiergo	(Spain) Carlos Taberner (Argentina) Mariano Kestelboim (Ukraine) Vladyslav Manafov (Portugal) André Gaspar Murta
June 27	Romania F8 Futures; Curtea de Argeș, Romania; Clay $10,000; Singles and doubles draws	(Argentina) Mariano Kestelboim (Romania) Petru-Alexandru Luncanu; 6–1, 6–3	(Romania) Victor-Mugurel Anagnastopol (Romania) Victor Vlad Cornea	(Argentina) Juan Pablo Paz (France) Jordan Ubiergo	(Spain) Carlos Taberner (Argentina) Mariano Kestelboim (Ukraine) Vladyslav Manafov (Portugal) André Gaspar Murta
June 27	Russia F2 Futures; Kazan, Russia; Clay $10,000; Singles and doubles draws	(Spain) Marc Giner; 6–2, 4–6, 6–3	(Russia) Evgeny Karlovskiy	(Russia) Ronald Slobodchikov (Russia) Ilya Vasilyev	(Estonia) Vladimir Ivanov (Russia) Vitaly Kozyukov (Russia) Anton Zaitcev (Russia) Victor Baluda
June 27	Russia F2 Futures; Kazan, Russia; Clay $10,000; Singles and doubles draws	(Russia) Alexander Vasilenko (Russia) Anton Zaitcev; 3–6, 6–2, [10–4]	(Russia) Anton Galkin (Russia) Ilya Lebedev	(Russia) Ronald Slobodchikov (Russia) Ilya Vasilyev	(Estonia) Vladimir Ivanov (Russia) Vitaly Kozyukov (Russia) Anton Zaitcev (Russia) Victor Baluda
June 27	Spain F19 Futures; Bakio, Spain; Hard $10,000; Singles and doubles draws	(Spain) Ricardo Ojeda Lara; 6–2, 6–3	(Spain) Adrián Menéndez-Maceiras	(Portugal) Fred Gil (Spain) Oriol Roca Batalla	(Spain) Bernabé Zapata Miralles (Spain) Samuel Ribeiro Navarrete (Spain) Carlos Boluda-Purkiss (Spain) Jaume Pla Malfeito
June 27	Spain F19 Futures; Bakio, Spain; Hard $10,000; Singles and doubles draws	(Norway) Viktor Durasovic (Spain) Jaume Munar; 6–3, 6–4	(Spain) Juan Lizariturry (Spain) Jaume Pla Malfeito	(Portugal) Fred Gil (Spain) Oriol Roca Batalla	(Spain) Bernabé Zapata Miralles (Spain) Samuel Ribeiro Navarrete (Spain) Carlos Boluda-Purkiss (Spain) Jaume Pla Malfeito
June 27	Turkey F26 Futures; Mersin, Turkey; Clay $10,000; Singles and doubles draws	(Italy) Riccardo Bellotti; 6–4, 6–3	(Spain) Rubén Ramírez Hidalgo	(Lithuania) Lukas Mugevičius (Bolivia) Federico Zeballos	(Austria) Sebastian Ofner (Turkey) Anıl Yüksel (Bolivia) Hugo Dellien (Turkmenistan) Isa Mammetgulyyev
June 27	Turkey F26 Futures; Mersin, Turkey; Clay $10,000; Singles and doubles draws	(Lithuania) Lukas Mugevičius (Austria) David Pichler; 1–6, 6–3, [10–3]	(Turkey) Tuna Altuna (Turkey) Anıl Yüksel	(Lithuania) Lukas Mugevičius (Bolivia) Federico Zeballos	(Austria) Sebastian Ofner (Turkey) Anıl Yüksel (Bolivia) Hugo Dellien (Turkmenistan) Isa Mammetgulyyev
June 27	United States F22 Futures; Pittsburgh, United States; Clay $10,000; Singles and doubles draws	(New Zealand) Jose Statham; 6–3, 2–6, 6–2	(Japan) Kaichi Uchida	(United States) Thai-Son Kwiatkowski (United States) Winston Lin	(Australia) Gavin van Peperzeel (United States) Adam El Mihdawy (United States) Connor Smith (United States) Patrick Daciek
June 27	United States F22 Futures; Pittsburgh, United States; Clay $10,000; Singles and doubles draws	(United States) Connor Smith (United States) Danny Thomas; 3–6, 6–4, [10–6]	(United States) Robert Galloway (United States) Robbie Mudge	(United States) Thai-Son Kwiatkowski (United States) Winston Lin	(Australia) Gavin van Peperzeel (United States) Adam El Mihdawy (United States) Connor Smith (United States) Patrick Daciek
June 27	Zimbabwe F2 Futures; Harare, Zimbabwe; Hard $10,000; Singles and doubles draws	(Australia) Marc Polmans; 6–2, 6–2	(South Africa) Lloyd Harris	(United States) Mitchell Frank (South Africa) Nicolaas Scholtz	(Italy) Andrea Vavassori (United States) Michael Grant (India) Vishnu Vardhan (United States) John Lamble
June 27	Zimbabwe F2 Futures; Harare, Zimbabwe; Hard $10,000; Singles and doubles draws	(France) Hugo Nys (India) Vishnu Vardhan; 6–4, 6–2	(South Africa) Nicolaas Scholtz (South Africa) Tucker Vorster	(United States) Mitchell Frank (South Africa) Nicolaas Scholtz	(Italy) Andrea Vavassori (United States) Michael Grant (India) Vishnu Vardhan (United States) John Lamble
