= 2016 RC Hotel Open – Doubles =

Doubles
- 2016 RC Hotel Open

Final
- Champions: (Sweden) Isak Arvidsson (Sweden) Fred Simonsson
- Runners-up: (Sweden) Markus Eriksson (Sweden) Milos Sekulic
- Score: 6–3, 3–6, [10–6]

Events
Singles	Doubles
RC Hotel Open	· 2017 →

This was the first edition of the tournament.

Isak Arvidsson and Fred Simonsson won the title, defeating Markus Eriksson and Milos Sekulic 6–3, 3–6, [10–6] in the final.

== Seeds ==
1. (Netherlands) Wesley Koolhof / (Netherlands) Matwé Middelkoop (quarterfinals)
2. (Australia) Rameez Junaid / (United Kingdom) Jonathan Marray (first round)
3. (United Kingdom) Ken Skupski / (United Kingdom) Neal Skupski (first round)
4. (Poland) Mateusz Kowalczyk / (Sweden) Andreas Siljeström (first round)

== Draw ==
=== Key ===
- Q = Qualifier
- WC = Wild card
- LL = Lucky loser
- Alt = Alternate
- SE = Special exempt
- PR = Protected ranking
- ITF = ITF entry
- JE = Junior exempt
- w/o = Walkover
- r = Retired
- d = Defaulted
- SR = Special ranking

First round
1	(Netherlands) W Koolhof (Netherlands) M Middelkoop	6	6
(Italy) A Arnaboldi (France) T Lamasine	3	2
WC	(Sweden) I Arvidsson (Sweden) F Simonsson	7^{7}	7^{7}
(Belarus) U Ignatik (Slovakia) I Zelenay	6^{3}	6^{4}
4	(Poland) M Kowalczyk (Sweden) A Siljeström	6^{3}	2
WC	(Sweden) D Windahl (Sweden) E Ymer	7^{7}	6
(United States) J Cerretani (Austria) T-S Weissborn	6	7^{7}
(Russia) K Kravchuk (Austria) P Oswald	3	6^{4}
(Croatia) N Mektić (Croatia) A Šančić	6	6
(Sweden) J Brunström (Denmark) F Nielsen	2	4
(Russia) A Karatsev (Germany) F Moser	6	6
3	(United Kingdom) K Skupski (United Kingdom) N Skupski	3	2
(Moldova) R Albot (Uzbekistan) F Dustov	4	6^{3}
(Germany) D Brown (Germany) J-L Struff	6	7^{7}
WC	(Sweden) M Eriksson (Sweden) M Sekulic	1	6	[10]
2	(Australia) R Junaid (United Kingdom) J Marray	6	4	[7]

Quarterfinals
1	(Netherlands) W Koolhof (Netherlands) M Middelkoop	3	4
WC	(Sweden) I Arvidsson (Sweden) F Simonsson	6	6
WC	(Sweden) D Windahl (Sweden) E Ymer	6	6
(United States) J Cerretani (Austria) T-S Weissborn	3	4
(Croatia) N Mektić (Croatia) A Šančić	6^{0}	7^{7}	[12]
(Russia) A Karatsev (Germany) F Moser	7^{7}	6^{3}	[14]
(Germany) D Brown (Germany) J-L Struff	6^{7}	6	[5]
WC	(Sweden) M Eriksson (Sweden) M Sekulic	7^{9}	4	[10]

Semifinals
WC	(Sweden) I Arvidsson (Sweden) F Simonsson	6	6
WC	(Sweden) D Windahl (Sweden) E Ymer	3	4
(Russia) A Karatsev (Germany) F Moser	3	6	[5]
WC	(Sweden) M Eriksson (Sweden) M Sekulic	6	3	[10]

Final
WC	(Sweden) I Arvidsson (Sweden) F Simonsson	6	3	[10]
WC	(Sweden) M Eriksson (Sweden) M Sekulic	3	6	[6]
