= Karen Khachanov career statistics =

Career statistics of Russian professional tennis player

Career finals
Discipline	Type	Won	Lost	Total
Singles	Grand Slam	–	–	–
Singles	ATP Finals	–	–	–
Singles	ATP 1000	1	1	2
Singles	ATP 500	0	1	1
Singles	ATP 250	6	1	7
Singles	Olympics	0	1	1
Singles	Total	7	4	11
Doubles	Grand Slam	–	–	–
Doubles	ATP Finals	–	–	–
Doubles	ATP 1000	1	2	3
Doubles	ATP 500	0	1	1
Doubles	ATP 250	0	1	1
Doubles	Olympics	–	–	–
Doubles	Total	1	4	5

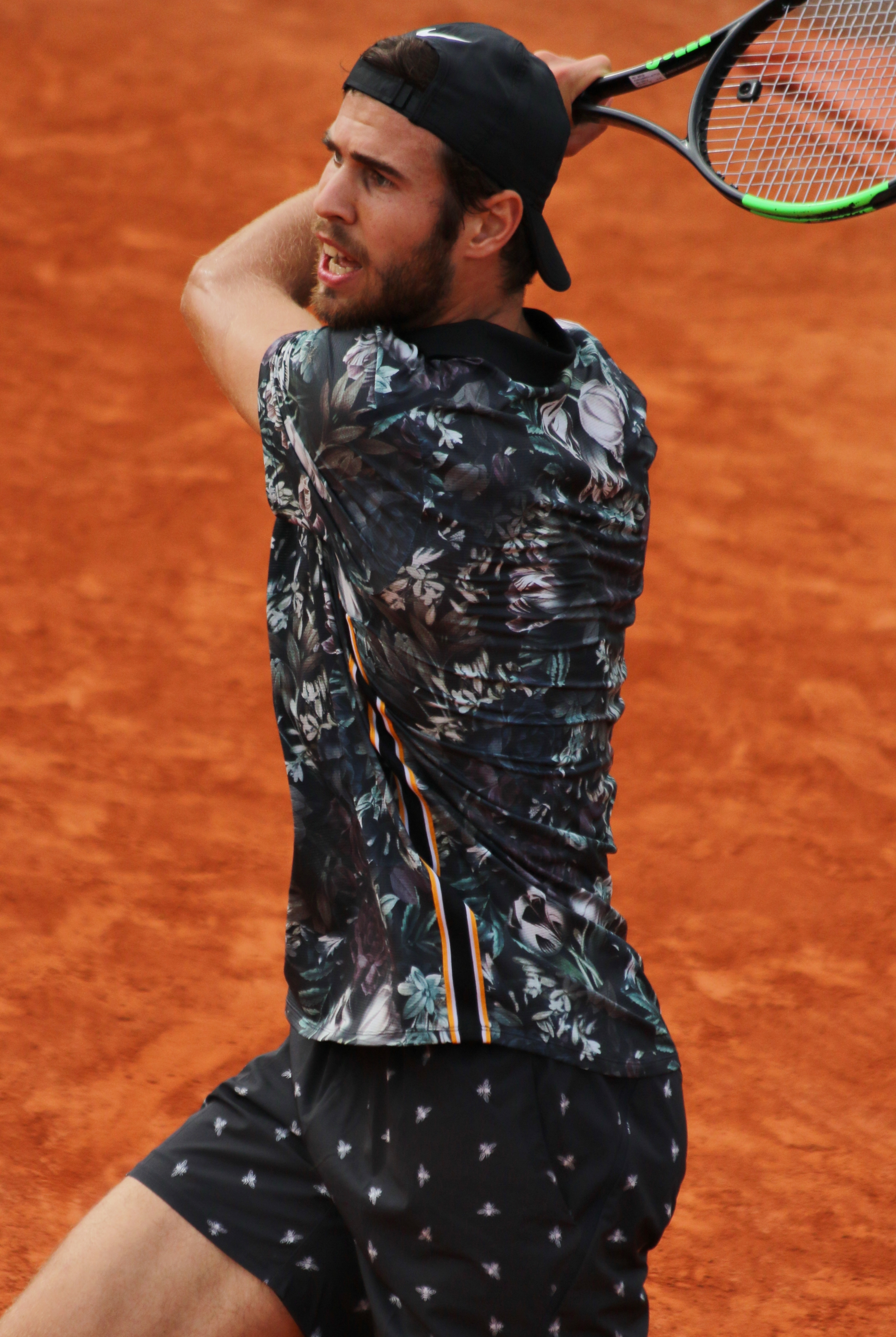
Karen Khachanov at the 2019 French Open

This is a list of main career statistics of Russian professional tennis player Karen Khachanov. All statistics are according to the ATP World Tour and ITF websites.

== Performance timelines ==
Key
W	F	SF	QF	#R	RR	Q#	P#	DNQ	A	Z#	PO	G	S	B	NMS	NTI	P	NH

(W) winner; (F) finalist; (SF) semifinalist; (QF) quarterfinalist; (#R) rounds 4, 3, 2, 1; (RR) round-robin stage; (Q#) qualification round; (P#) preliminary round; (DNQ) did not qualify; (A) absent; (Z#) Davis/Fed Cup Zonal Group (with number indication) or (PO) play-off; (G) gold, (S) silver or (B) bronze Olympic/Paralympic medal; (NMS) not a Masters tournament; (NTI) not a Tier I tournament; (P) postponed; (NH) not held; (SR) strike rate (events won / competed); (W–L) win–loss record.
To avoid confusion and double counting, these charts are updated at the conclusion of a tournament or when the player's participation has ended.

Only main-draw results in ATP Tour, Grand Slam tournaments, Davis Cup/ATP Cup/Laver Cup and Olympic Games are included in win–loss records.

=== Singles ===
Current through the 2026 US Open.

Tournament	2016	2017	2018	2019	2020	2021	2022	2023	2024	2025	2026	SR	W–L	Win%
Grand Slam tournaments
Australian Open	Q3	2R	2R	3R	3R	3R	3R	SF	4R	3R	3R	0 / 10	22–10	69%
French Open	Q2	4R	4R	QF	4R	2R	4R	QF	2R	3R	3R	0 / 10	26–10	72%
Wimbledon	Q3	3R	4R	3R	NH	QF	A (Note: Russian athletes were banned from competing following the 2022 Russian invasion of Ukraine.)	A	2R	QF	3R	0 / 6	16–6	73%
US Open	2R	1R	3R	1R	3R	1R	SF	1R	1R	2R	SF	0 / 11	16–11	59%
Win–loss	1–1	6–4	9–4	8–4	7–3	7–4	10–3	9–3	5–4	9–4	11–4	0 / 38	82–38	68%
Year-end championships
ATP Finals	DNQ		Alt	DNQ								0 / 0	0–0	–
National representation
Summer Olympics	A	NH				S	NH		A	NH		0 / 1	4–1	80%
Davis Cup	A	1R	Z1	SF	W (Note: Edit is split into two years due to COVID-19.)		A	A	A	A	A	1 / 3	7–7	50%
ATP 1000
Indian Wells Open	A	2R	1R	QF	NH	4R	2R	3R	2R	3R	2R	0 / 9	8–9	47%
Miami Open	A	1R	3R	2R	NH	3R	2R	SF	4R	3R	3R	0 / 10	10–10	50%
Monte-Carlo Masters	Q1	2R	3R	2R	NH	2R	1R	3R	QF	1R	1R	0 / 9	9–9	50%
Madrid Open	A	1R	1R	2R	NH	1R	1R	QF	4R	3R	3R	0 / 9	8–9	47%
Italian Open	A	A	1R	3R	1R	1R	3R	3R	4R	4R	QF	0 / 9	11–9	55%
Canadian Open	A	1R	SF	SF	NH	3R	2R	A	2R	F	2R	0 / 8	16–8	67%
Cincinnati Open	A	3R	3R	3R	3R	2R	1R	A	2R	4R	1R	0 / 9	11–9	55%
Shanghai Masters	Q1	1R	2R	3R	NH			3R	2R	2R	4R	0 / 6	3–6	33%
Paris Masters	A	1R	W	2R	1R	2R	3R	QF	SF	3R	2R	1 / 9	18–8	69%
Win–loss	0–0	4–8	16–8	11–9	2–3	8–8	5–8	14–7	15–9	14–9	8–9	1 / 78	94–77	55%
Career statistics
	2016	2017	2018	2019	2020	2021	2022	2023	2024	2025	2026	Career		
Tournaments (Note: 2013 ATP Tournaments: 2) (Note: 2014 ATP Tournaments: 2)	10	28	25	26	14	24	25	19	24	24	19	Career total: 242		
Titles	1	0	3	0	0	0	0	1	2	0	0	Career total: 7		
Finals	1	0	3	0	0	1	1	1	3	1	0	Career total: 11		
Hard win–loss	8–5	7–20	35–15	19–20	16–12	25–15	23–16	24–13	28–15	15–15	12–11	7 / 158	216–163	100%
Clay win–loss	5–4	14–9	6–5	7–6	4–3	5–6	9–7	10–5	8–4	9–6	7–6	0 / 58	84–59	59%
Grass win–loss	0–0	5–2	5–2	4–3	0–0	5–3	4–2	0–0	1–3	8–3	2–2	0 / 20	34–20	63%
Overall win–loss	13–9	26–31	46–22	30–29	20–15	35–24	36–25	34–18	37–22	32–24	21–18	7 / 244	334–244	58%
Win %	59%	46%	68%	51%	57%	59%	59%	65%	63%	57%	54%	Career total: 58%		
Year-end ranking (Note: 2013: ATP ranking–451) (Note: 2014: ATP ranking–372) (Note: 2015: ATP ranking–152)	53	45	11	17	20	29	20	15	19	17		$22,518,695		

=== Doubles ===
Current through the 2026 Monte-Carlo Masters.

Tournament	2017	2018	2019	2020	2021	2022	2023	2024	2025	2026	SR	W–L	Win%
Grand Slam tournaments
Australian Open	2R	A	A	A	A	A	A	A	A	A	0 / 1	1–1	50%
French Open	2R	1R	A	A	A	A	A	A	A		0 / 2	1–2	33%
Wimbledon	A	A	A	NH	A	A	A	A	A		0 / 0	0–0	–
US Open	3R	A	A	A	A	A	A	A	A		0 / 1	2–1	67%
Win–loss	4–3	0–1	0–0	0–0	0–0	0–0	0–0	0–0	0–0	0–0	0 / 4	4–4	50%
ATP 1000
Indian Wells Open	A	A	1R	NH	A	1R	1R	1R	1R	QF	0 / 6	2–6	25%
Miami Open	A	F	1R	NH	2R	2R	A	A	A	A	0 / 4	6–2	75%
Monte-Carlo Masters	A	A	2R	NH	2R	1R	2R	2R	2R	1R	0 / 7	5–6	45%
Madrid Open	A	1R	2R	NH	2R	2R	W	A	A		1 / 5	8–4	67%
Italian Open	A	A	2R	1R	A	A	2R	A	A		0 / 3	2–1	67%
Canadian Open	2R	A	1R	NH	2R	1R	A	1R	1R		0 / 6	2–6	25%
Cincinnati Open	1R	1R	1R	1R	2R	QF	2R	1R	A		0 / 8	4–8	33%
Shanghai Masters	A	A	1R	NH			2R	2R	2R		0 / 4	2–2	50%
Paris Masters	1R	A	F	A	A	1R	2R	A	A		0 / 4	4–4	50%
Win–loss	1–3	4–3	7–8	0–2	5–4	4–6	8–5	2–4	2–2	2–2	1 / 47	35–39	47%
Career statistics
	2017	2018	2019	2020	2021	2022	2023	2024	2025	2026	Career		
Tournaments (Note: 2014 Tournaments: 1) (Note: 2016 Tournaments: 3)	13	11	14	6	11	11	9	9	9	5	Career total: 102		
Titles	0	0	0	0	0	0	1	0	0	0	Career total: 1		
Finals	0	1	1	0	0	0	1	1	2	1	Career total: 7		
Overall win–loss (Note: 2014 Win-loss: 2–2) (Note: 2016 Win-loss: 2–3)	8–12	7–12	11–15	3–7	9–10	5–9	11–7	8–7	8–7	5–5	1 / 102	79–96	45%
Win %	40%	37%	42%	30%	47%	36%	61%	53%	53%	50%	Career total: 45%		
Year-end ranking (Note: 2014: ATP ranking–400) (Note: 2015: ATP ranking–551) (Note: 2016: ATP ranking–364)	121	112	86	80	172	239	58	142	152				

== Significant finals ==
=== ATP 1000 tournaments ===
==== Singles: 2 (1 title, 1 runner-up) ====
Result	Year	Tournament	Surface	Opponent	Score
Win	2018	Paris Masters	Hard (i)	(Serbia) Novak Djokovic	7–5, 6–4
Loss	2025	Canadian Open	Hard	(United States) Ben Shelton	7–6^{(7–5)}, 4–6, 6–7^{(3–7)}

==== Doubles: 3 (1 title, 2 runner-ups) ====
Result	Year	Tournament	Surface	Partner	Opponents	Score
Loss	2018	Miami Open	Hard	(Russia) Andrey Rublev	(United States) Bob Bryan (United States) Mike Bryan	6–4, 6–7^{(5–7)}, [4–10]
Loss	2019	Paris Masters	Hard (i)	(Russia) Andrey Rublev	(France) Pierre-Hugues Herbert (France) Nicolas Mahut	4–6, 1–6
Win	2023	Madrid Open	Clay	Andrey Rublev	(India) Rohan Bopanna (Australia) Matthew Ebden	6–3, 3–6, [10–3]

=== Summer Olympics ===
==== Singles: 1 (silver medal) ====
Result	Year	Tournament	Surface	Opponent	Score
Silver	2021	Tokyo Summer Olympics	Hard	(Germany) Alexander Zverev	3–6, 1–6

== ATP Tour finals ==
=== Singles: 11 (7 titles, 4 runner-ups) ===
Legend Grand Slam (–) Olympics (0–1) ATP Finals (–) ATP 1000 (1–1) ATP 500 (0–1) ATP 250 (6–1)	Finals by surface Hard (7–4) Clay (–) Grass (–)	Finals by setting Outdoor (3–3) Indoor (4–1)

Result	W–L	Date	Tournament	Tier	Surface	Opponent	Score
Win	1–0	Oct 2016	Chengdu Open, China	ATP 250	Hard	(Spain) Albert Ramos Viñolas	6–7^{(4–7)}, 7–6^{(7–3)}, 6–3
Win	2–0	Feb 2018	Open 13, France	ATP 250	Hard (i)	(France) Lucas Pouille	7–5, 3–6, 7–5
Win	3–0	Oct 2018	Kremlin Cup, Russia	ATP 250	Hard (i)	(France) Adrian Mannarino	6–2, 6–2
Win	4–0	Nov 2018	Paris Masters, France	ATP 1000	Hard (i)	(Serbia) Novak Djokovic	7–5, 6–4
Loss	4–1	Aug 2021	Olympic Games, Japan	Olympics	Hard	(Germany) Alexander Zverev	3–6, 1–6
Loss	4–2	Jan 2022	Adelaide International 1, Australia	ATP 250	Hard	(France) Gaël Monfils	4–6, 4–6
Win	5–2	Sep 2023	Zhuhai Championships, China	ATP 250	Hard	(Japan) Yoshihito Nishioka	7–6^{(7–2)}, 6–1
Win	6–2	Feb 2024	Qatar Open, Qatar	ATP 250	Hard	(Czech Republic) Jakub Menšík	7–6^{(14–12)}, 6–4
Win	7–2	Oct 2024	Almaty Open, Kazakhstan	ATP 250	Hard (i)	(Canada) Gabriel Diallo	6–2, 5–7, 6–3
Loss	7–3	Oct 2024	Vienna Open, Austria	ATP 500	Hard (i)	(United Kingdom) Jack Draper	4–6, 5–7
Loss	7–4	Jul 2025	Canadian Open, Canada	ATP 1000	Hard	(United States) Ben Shelton	7–6^{(7–5)}, 4–6, 6–7^{(3–7)}

=== Doubles: 7 (1 title, 6 runner-ups) ===
Legend Grand Slam (–) ATP Finals (–) ATP 1000 (1–2) ATP 500 (0–2) ATP 250 (0–2)	Finals by surface Hard (0–5) Clay (1–0) Grass (0–1)	Finals by setting Outdoor (1–4) Indoor (0–2)

Result	W–L	Date	Tournament	Tier	Surface	Partner	Opponents	Score
Loss	0–1	Mar 2018	Miami Open, US	ATP 1000	Hard	(Russia) Andrey Rublev	(United States) Bob Bryan (United States) Mike Bryan	6–4, 6–7^{(5–7)}, [4–10]
Loss	0–2	Nov 2019	Paris Masters, France	ATP 1000	Hard (i)	(Russia) Andrey Rublev	(France) Pierre-Hugues Herbert (France) Nicolas Mahut	4–6, 1–6
Win	1–2	May 2023	Madrid Open, Spain	ATP 1000	Clay	Andrey Rublev	(India) Rohan Bopanna (Australia) Matthew Ebden	6–3, 3–6, [10–3]
Loss	1–3	Jun 2024	Queen's Club Championships, UK	ATP 500	Grass	(United States) Taylor Fritz	(United Kingdom) Neal Skupski (New Zealand) Michael Venus	6–4, 6–7^{(5–7)}, [8–10]
Loss	1–4	Jan 2025	Hong Kong Open, China SAR	ATP 250	Hard	Andrey Rublev	(Netherlands) Sander Arends (United Kingdom) Luke Johnson	5–7, 6–4, [7–10]
Loss	1–5	Oct 2025	China Open, China	ATP 500	Hard	Andrey Rublev	(Finland) Harri Heliövaara (United Kingdom) Henry Patten	6–4, 3–6, [8–10]
Loss	1–6	Jan 2026	Hong Kong Open, China SAR	ATP 250	Hard	Andrey Rublev	(Italy) Lorenzo Musetti (Italy) Lorenzo Sonego	4–6, 6–2, [1–10]

== Youth Olympic medal matches ==
=== Doubles: 1 (silver medal) ===
Result	Year	Tournament	Surface	Partner	Opponents	Score
Silver	2014	Nanjing Youth Olympics	Hard	(Russia) Andrey Rublev	(Brazil) Orlando Luz (Brazil) Marcelo Zormann	5–7, 6–3, [3–10]

== ATP Challenger Tour finals ==
=== Singles: 3 (2 titles, 1 runner-up) ===
Legend ATP Challenger Tour (2–1)

Result	W–L	Date	Tournament	Tier	Surface	Opponent	Score
Win	1–0	Sep 2015	Amex-Istanbul Challenger, Turkey	Challenger	Hard	(Ukraine) Sergiy Stakhovsky	4–6, 6–4, 6–3
Loss	1–1	Mar 2016	Hotel Open, Sweden	Challenger	Hard (i)	(Kazakhstan) Andrey Golubev	7–6^{(11–9)}, 6–7^{(5–7)}, 6–7^{(4–7)}
Win	2–1	May 2016	Samarkand Challenger, Uzbekistan	Challenger	Clay	(Spain) Rubén Ramírez Hidalgo	6–1, 6–7^{(6–8)}, 6–1

== ITF Tour finals ==
=== Singles: 5 (5 titles) ===
Legend ITF Futures (5–0)	Finals by surface Hard (5–0) Clay (–)

Result	W–L	Date	Tournament	Tier	Surface	Opponent	Score
Win	1–0	Aug 2014	F2 Kaohsiung, Taiwan	Futures	Hard	(India) Sriram Balaji	6–7^{(4–7)}, 6–4, 6–3
Win	2–0	Sep 2014	F18 Mulhouse, France	Futures	Hard (i)	(France) David Guez	6–2, 6–0
Win	3–0	Mar 2015	F4 Lille, France	Futures	Hard (i)	(France) Rudy Coco	6–1, 6–4
Win	4–0	Mar 2015	F5 Toulouse-Balma, France	Futures	Hard (i)	(France) Fabien Reboul	6–4, 6–1
Win	5–0	Apr 2015	F2 Bukhara, Uzbekistan	Futures	Hard	(Belarus) Dzmitry Zhyrmont	7–5, 4–6, 6–3

=== Doubles: 3 (1 title, 2 runner-ups) ===
Legend ITF Futures (1–2)

Result	W–L	Date	Tournament	Tier	Surface	Partner	Opponents	Score
Loss	0–1	Jan 2014	F2 Stuttgart-Stammheim, Germany	Futures	Hard (i)	(Russia) Denis Matsukevich	(Germany) Hannes Wagner (Germany) Kevin Krawietz	6–4, 3–6, [7–10]
Win	1–1	Sep 2014	F18 Mulhouse, France	Futures	Hard (i)	(Russia) Daniil Medvedev	(France) Élie Rousset (France) Olivier Charroin	7–6^{(7–5)}, 4–6, [10–7]
Loss	1–2	Jan 2015	F1 Astana, Kazakhstan	Futures	Hard (i)	(Russia) Mikhail Elgin	(Belarus) Yaraslav Shyla (Belarus) Andrei Vasilevski	6–3, 6–7^{(2–7)}, [4–10]

== National and international representation ==
=== Davis Cup: 22 (9–13) ===
Group membership World Group/Finals (3–8) WG Play-off / Qualifying round (3–1) Group I (3–5) Group II (–) Group III (–) Group IV (–)	Matches by surface Hard (8–12) Clay (1–1) Grass (–) Carpet (–)	Matches by type Singles (7–7) Doubles (2–6)

- ▲ ▼ indicates the outcome of the Davis Cup match followed by the score, date, place of event, the zonal classification and its phase, and the court surface.

Rubber outcome	No.	Rubber	Match type (partner if any)	Opponent nation	Opponent player(s)	Score
▲5–0; 25–27 October 2013; Olympic Stadium, Moscow, Russia; Europe/Africa second round play-off; hard(i) surface
Victory	1	I	Singles	South Africa	Dean O'Brien	7–5, 6–1, 6–3
▼2–3; 31 January – 2 February 2014; Olympic Stadium, Moscow, Russia; Europe/Africa first round; hard(i) surface
Defeat	2	I	Singles	Poland	Jerzy Janowicz	2–6, 4–6, 4–6
Defeat	3	III	Doubles (with Konstantin Kravchuk)	Poland	Mariusz Fyrstenberg / Marcin Matkowski	6–2, 4–6, 1–6, 0–6
▲3–2; 17–19 July 2015; Fetisov Arena, Vladivostok, Russia; Europe/Africa second round; hard(i) surface
Defeat	4	II	Singles	Spain	Pablo Andújar	3–6, 3–6, 2–6
▼1–4; 3–5 February 2017; Čair Sports Center, Niš, Serbia; World Group; hard(i) surface
Defeat	5	I	Singles	Serbia	Viktor Troicki	4–6, 7–6^{(3)}, 3–6, 6–1, 6–7^{(6)}
▼1–3; 15–17 September 2017; Kopaszi Dam, Budapest, Hungary; World Group play-off; clay surface
Victory	6	II	Singles	Hungary	Attila Balázs	3–6, 6–2, 7–6^{(12)}, 6–1
Defeat	7	IV	Singles	Hungary	Márton Fucsovics	5–7, 4–6, 4–6
▼1–3; 6–7 April 2018; Luzhniki Small Sports Arena, Moscow, Russia; Europe/Africa second round; hard(i) surface
Defeat	8	III	Doubles (with Andrey Rublev)	Austria	Jürgen Melzer / Philipp Oswald	3–6, 6–7^{(3)}
▲3–2; 14–15 September 2018; Luzhniki Small Sports Arena, Moscow, Russia; Europe/Africa first round play-off; hard(i) surface
Victory	9	I	Singles	Belarus	Egor Gerasimov	7–6^{(4)}, 6–3
Defeat	10	III	Doubles (with Andrey Rublev)	Belarus	Max Mirnyi / Andrei Vasilevski	5–7, 3–6
Victory	11	IV	Singles	Belarus	Ilya Ivashka	6–2, 6–4
▲3–1; 1–2 February 2019; Swiss Tennis Arena, Biel/Bienne, Switzerland; qualifying round; hard(i) surface
Victory	12	II	Singles	Switzerland	Marc-Andrea Hüsler	6–3, 7–5
Victory	13	IV	Singles	Switzerland	Henri Laaksonen	6–7^{(2)}, 7–6^{(6)}, 6–4
▲3–0; 18 November 2019; Estadio Manolo Santana, Madrid, Spain; Finals group stage; hard(i) surface
Victory	14	II	Singles	Croatia	Borna Ćorić	6–7^{(4)}, 6–4, 6–4
Victory	15	III	Doubles (with Andrey Rublev)	Croatia	Ivan Dodig / Nikola Mektić	7–6^{(3)}, 6–4
▼1–2; 19 November 2019; Estadio Manolo Santana, Madrid, Spain; Finals group stage; hard(i) surface
Defeat	16	II	Singles	Spain	Rafael Nadal	3–6, 6–7^{(7)}
Defeat	17	III	Doubles (with Andrey Rublev)	Spain	Marcel Granollers / Feliciano López	4–6, 6–7^{(5)}
▲2–1; 22 November 2019; Estadio Manolo Santana, Madrid, Spain; Finals Quarterfinal; hard(i) surface
Defeat	18	II	Singles	Serbia	Novak Djokovic	3–6, 3–6
Victory	19	III	Doubles (with Andrey Rublev)	Serbia	Novak Djokovic / Viktor Troicki	6–4, 4–6, 7–6^{(8)}
▼1–2; 23 November 2019; Estadio Manolo Santana, Madrid, Spain; Finals Semifinal; hard(i) surface
Defeat	20	II	Singles	Canada	Denis Shapovalov	4–6, 6–4, 4–6
Defeat	21	III	Doubles (with Andrey Rublev)	Canada	Vasek Pospisil / Denis Shapovalov	3–6, 6–3, 6–7^{(5)}
▲2–1; 4 December 2021; Estadio Manolo Santana, Madrid, Spain; Finals Semifinal; hard(i) surface
Defeat	22	III (dead rubber)	Doubles (with Aslan Karatsev)	Germany	Kevin Krawietz / Tim Pütz	6–4, 3–6, 4–6

=== ATP Cup: 7 (5–2) ===
Matches by surface Hard (5–2) Clay (–) Grass (–)	Matches by type Singles (4–1) Doubles (1–1)

Rubber outcome	No.	Rubber	Match type (partner if any)	Opponent nation	Opponent player(s)	Score
▲8–1; 3–7 January 2020; Perth Arena, Perth, Australia; group stage; hard surface
Victory	1	I	Singles	Italy	Stefano Travaglia	7–5, 6–3
Victory	2	III	Doubles (with Daniil Medvedev)	Italy	Simone Bolelli / Paolo Lorenzi	6–4, 6–3
Victory	3	I	Singles	United States	Taylor Fritz	3–6, 7–5, 6–1
Defeat	4	III	Doubles (with Daniil Medvedev)	United States	Austin Krajicek / Rajeev Ram	3–6, 4–6
Victory	5	I	Singles	Norway	Viktor Durasovic	6–2, 6–1
3–3; 10–11 January 2020; Ken Rosewall Arena, Sydney, Australia; Knockout stage; hard surface
Victory	6	I	Singles	Argentina	Guido Pella	6–2, 7–6^{(7–4)}
Defeat	7	I	Singles	Serbia	Dušan Lajović	5–7, 6–7^{(1–7)}

== ATP Tour career earnings ==
Year	Grand Slam singles titles	ATP singles titles	Total singles titles	Earnings ($)
2012	0	0	0	176
2013	0	0	0	32,526
2014	0	0	0	36,761
2015	0	0	0	65,361
2016	0	1	1	455,236
2017	0	0	0	1,246,107
2018	0	3	3	3,126,856
2019	0	0	0	2,285,083
2020	0	0	0	1,290,042
2021	0	0	0	1,319,971
2022	0	0	0	1,985,393
2023	0	1	1	2,762,771
2024	0	2	2	2,519,591
2025	0	0	0	3,307,201
2026	0	0	0	22,235
Career	0	7	7	$21,629,612

* Statistics correct as of 19 January 2026.

== Grand Slam seedings ==
Year	Australian Open	French Open	Wimbledon	US Open
2015	did not play	did not play	did not qualify	did not qualify
2016	did not qualify	did not qualify	did not qualify	qualifier
2017	not seeded	not seeded	30th	25th
2018	not seeded	not seeded	not seeded	27th
2019	10th	10th	10th	9th
2020	16th	15th	Not Held	11th
2021	19th	23rd	25th	25th
2022	28th	21st	did not play	27th
2023	18th	11th	did not play	11th
2024	15th	18th	21st	23rd
2025	19th	24th	17th	9th
2026	15th			

== Wins over top 10 players ==
- Khachanov has a 17–58 (22.7%) record against players who were, at the time the match was played, ranked in the top 10. Between his 2019 win against Zverev and his 2023 win against Tsitsipas, he experienced a 23-match losing streak against top-10 opposition.

Season	2017	2018	2019	2020	2021	2022	2023	2024	2025	2026	Total
Wins	2	5	3	0	0	0	2	3	1	1	17

#	Player	Rk	Event	Surface	Rd	Score	Rk	Ref
2017
1.	(Belgium) David Goffin	10	Barcelona Open, Spain	Clay	3R	6–7^{(7–9)}, 6–3, 6–4	56	
2.	(Japan) Kei Nishikori	9	Halle Open, Germany	Grass	2R	3–2, ret.	38	
2018
3.	(United States) John Isner	9	Canadian Open, Canada	Hard	3R	7–6^{(7–5)}, 7–6^{(7–1)}	38	
4.	(United States) John Isner	9	Paris Masters, France	Hard (i)	3R	6–4, 6–7^{(9–11)}, 7–6^{(10–8)}	18	
5.	(Germany) Alexander Zverev	5	Paris Masters, France	Hard (i)	QF	6–1, 6–2	18	
6.	(Austria) Dominic Thiem	8	Paris Masters, France	Hard (i)	SF	6–4, 6–1	18	
7.	(Serbia) Novak Djokovic	2	Paris Masters, France	Hard (i)	F	7–5, 6–4	18	
2019
8.	(United States) John Isner	9	Indian Wells Open, US	Hard	4R	6–4, 7–6^{(7–1)}	13	
9.	(Argentina) Juan Martín del Potro	9	French Open, France	Clay	4R	7–5, 6–3, 3–6, 6–3	11	
10.	(Germany) Alexander Zverev	7	Canadian Open, Canada	Hard	QF	6–3, 6–3	8	
2023
11.	(Greece) Stefanos Tsitsipas	3	Miami Open, US	Hard	4R	7–6^{(7–4)}, 6–4	16	
12.	Andrey Rublev	6	Madrid Open, Spain	Clay	4R	7–6^{(10–8)}, 6–4	12	
2024
13.	Daniil Medvedev	4	Monte-Carlo Masters, France	Clay	3R	6–3, 7–5	17	
14.	(Australia) Alex de Minaur	10	Vienna Open, Austria	Hard (i)	SF	6–2, 6–4	24	
15.	(Bulgaria) Grigor Dimitrov	9	Paris Masters, France	Hard (i)	QF	6–2, 6–3	21	
2025
16.	(Germany) Alexander Zverev	3	Canadian Open, Canada	Hard	SF	6–3, 4–6, 7–6^{(7–4)}	16	
2026
17.	(Canada) Félix Auger-Aliassime	4	US Open, US	Hard	2R	6–7^{(5–7)}, 6–3, 6–2, 6–2	50	

== Exhibition matches ==
=== Singles ===
Result	Date	Tournament	Surface	Opponent	Score
Win	Mar 2024	World Renowned Tennis Championship, Los Angeles, US	Hard	Andrey Rublev	6–3, 4–6, [10–8]
Loss	Jun 2024	Giorgio Armani Tennis Classic, London, UK	Grass	(Denmark) Holger Rune	2–6, 4–6
Win	Jun 2025	Giorgio Armani Tennis Classic, London, UK	Grass	(Serbia) Novak Djokovic	7–6^{(7–4)}, 6–4
Win	Jan 2026	Kooyong Classic, Melbourne, Australia	Hard	(United States) Frances Tiafoe	6–4, 6–4
Pending	Jun 2026	Giorgio Armani Tennis Classic, London, UK	Grass	(Serbia) Novak Djokovic	
