= 2016 RC Hotel Open – Singles =

Singles
- 2016 RC Hotel Open

Final
- Champion: (Kazakhstan) Andrey Golubev
- Runner-up: (Russia) Karen Khachanov
- Score: 6–7^{(9–11)}, 7–6^{(7–5)}, 7–6^{(7–4)}

Events
Singles	Doubles
RC Hotel Open	· 2017 →

This was the first edition of the tournament.

Andrey Golubev won the title, defeating Karen Khachanov 6–7^{(9–11)}, 7–6^{(7–5)}, 7–6^{(7–4)} in the final.

== Seeds ==
1. (Serbia) Filip Krajinović (second round)
2. (Germany) Dustin Brown (first round)
3. (Germany) Jan-Lennard Struff (semifinals)
4. (Slovakia) Lukáš Lacko (first round)
5. (Portugal) Gastão Elias (second round)
6. (Russia) Konstantin Kravchuk (second round)
7. (Bosnia and Herzegovina) Mirza Bašić (first round)
8. (Moldova) Radu Albot (first round)

== Draw ==
=== Key ===
- Q = Qualifier
- WC = Wild card
- LL = Lucky loser
- Alt = Alternate
- SE = Special exempt
- PR = Protected ranking
- ITF = ITF entry
- JE = Junior exempt
- w/o = Walkover
- r = Retired
- d = Defaulted
- SR = Special ranking

=== Finals ===
Semifinals
(Russia) Karen Khachanov	1	7^{7}	7^{7}
3	(Germany) Jan-Lennard Struff	6	6^{4}	6^{1}
Q	(Netherlands) Matwé Middelkoop	2	2
(Kazakhstan) Andrey Golubev	6	6

Final
(Russia) Karen Khachanov	7^{11}	6^{5}	6^{4}
(Kazakhstan) Andrey Golubev	6^{9}	7^{7}	7^{7}

=== Top half ===
First round
1	(Serbia) F Krajinović	7^{12}	6
LL	(Russia) E Karlovskiy	6^{10}	3
(Russia) A Karatsev	3	4
(Russia) K Khachanov	6	6
(Italy) A Arnaboldi	6	6
WC	(France) E Benchetrit	3	4
(Belarus) U Ignatik	3	2
6	(Russia) K Kravchuk	6	6
3	(Germany) J-L Struff	6	6
WC	(Sweden) M Eriksson	2	4
(Estonia) J Zopp	6	5	7
WC	(Sweden) D Windahl	1	7	5
(Uzbekistan) F Dustov	7^{7}	6
(Bosnia and Herzegovina) A Šetkić	6^{5}	2
(France) T Lamasine	3	6	6
8	(Moldova) R Albot	6	3	4

Second round
1	(Serbia) F Krajinović	6^{2}	4
(Russia) K Khachanov	7^{7}	6
(Italy) A Arnaboldi	4	7^{7}	7
6	(Russia) K Kravchuk	6	6^{5}	5
3	(Germany) J-L Struff	6	6
(Estonia) J Zopp	4	1
(Uzbekistan) F Dustov	3	7^{7}	4
(France) T Lamasine	6	6^{4}	6

Quarterfinals
(Russia) K Khachanov	6	6
(Italy) A Arnaboldi	2	3
3	(Germany) J-L Struff	6	7
(France) T Lamasine	3	5

Semifinals
(Russia) K Khachanov	1	7^{7}	7^{7}
3	(Germany) J-L Struff	6	6^{4}	6^{1}

=== Bottom half ===
First round
5	(Portugal) G Elias	7	6
(Slovakia) N Gombos	5	3
(Belgium) Y Mertens	4	5
Q	(Netherlands) M Middelkoop	6	7
(Kazakhstan) A Nedovyesov	2	3
(Sweden) E Ymer	6	6
Q	(France) C Lestienne	7^{7}	4	6
4	(Slovakia) L Lacko	6^{5}	6	4
7	(Bosnia and Herzegovina) M Bašić	6	4	3
Q	(Sweden) P Rosenholm	4	6	6
Q	(Spain) R Ortega Olmedo	4	4
(Slovenia) G Žemlja	6	6
SE	(Croatia) N Mektić	2	6	3
(Kazakhstan) A Golubev	6	3	6
WC	(Sweden) I Arvidsson	5	7	6
2	(Germany) D Brown	7	5	3

Second round
5	(Portugal) G Elias	4	1
Q	(Netherlands) M Middelkoop	6	6
(Sweden) E Ymer	6	6
Q	(France) C Lestienne	3	2
Q	(Sweden) P Rosenholm	5	7^{8}	7^{7}
(Slovenia) G Žemlja	7	6^{6}	6^{4}
(Kazakhstan) A Golubev	6	6
WC	(Sweden) I Arvidsson	2	4

Quarterfinals
Q	(Netherlands) M Middelkoop	7^{7}	3	6
(Sweden) E Ymer	6^{5}	6	2
Q	(Sweden) P Rosenholm	4	4
(Kazakhstan) A Golubev	6	6

Semifinals
Q	(Netherlands) M Middelkoop	2	2
(Kazakhstan) A Golubev	6	6
