= 2016 ITF Men's Circuit (January–March) =

The 2016 ITF Men's Circuit is the 2016 edition of the second-tier tour for men's professional tennis. It is organised by the International Tennis Federation and is a tier below the ATP Tour. The ITF Men's Circuit includes tournaments with prize money ranging from $10,000 up to $25,000.

== Key ==
$25,000 tournaments
$10,000 tournaments

== Month ==
=== January ===
Week of	Tournament	Winner	Runners-up	Semifinalists	Quarterfinalists
January 4	United States F1 Futures; Los Angeles, United States; Hard $25,000; Singles and doubles draws	(United States) Stefan Kozlov; 7–6^{(9–7)}, 6–7^{(3–7)}, 6–3	(Canada) Philip Bester	(United States) Tennys Sandgren (United States) Clay Thompson	(Germany) Sebastian Fanselow (Italy) Gianluigi Quinzi (United States) Ryan Shane (United Kingdom) Edward Corrie
January 4	United States F1 Futures; Los Angeles, United States; Hard $25,000; Singles and doubles draws	(United States) Evan King (United States) Raymond Sarmiento; 6–4, 3–6, [11–9]	(United States) Jean-Yves Aubone (United States) Dennis Nevolo	(United States) Tennys Sandgren (United States) Clay Thompson	(Germany) Sebastian Fanselow (Italy) Gianluigi Quinzi (United States) Ryan Shane (United Kingdom) Edward Corrie
January 4	Turkey F1 Futures; Antalya, Turkey; Hard $10,000; Singles and doubles draws	(Czech Republic) Michal Konečný; 6–4, 7–6^{(8–6)}	(Croatia) Mate Delić	(Netherlands) Miliaan Niesten (France) Ugo Humbert	(Turkey) Anıl Yüksel (France) Geoffrey Blancaneaux (France) Jules Okala (Germany) Christoph Negritu
January 4	Turkey F1 Futures; Antalya, Turkey; Hard $10,000; Singles and doubles draws	Not played due to bad weather		(Netherlands) Miliaan Niesten (France) Ugo Humbert	(Turkey) Anıl Yüksel (France) Geoffrey Blancaneaux (France) Jules Okala (Germany) Christoph Negritu
January 11	United States F2 Futures; Long Beach, USA; Hard $25,000; Singles and doubles draws	(Germany) Yannick Hanfmann; 6–4, 6–0	(United States) Michael Mmoh	(United Kingdom) Daniel Smethurst (United States) Eric Quigley	(Germany) Sebastian Fanselow (United States) Deiton Baughman (United States) Evan King (United States) Ernesto Escobedo
January 11	United States F2 Futures; Long Beach, USA; Hard $25,000; Singles and doubles draws	(Republic of Ireland) David O'Hare (United Kingdom) Joe Salisbury; 6–3, 7–6^{(7–4)}	(United States) Evan King (United States) Raymond Sarmiento	(United Kingdom) Daniel Smethurst (United States) Eric Quigley	(Germany) Sebastian Fanselow (United States) Deiton Baughman (United States) Evan King (United States) Ernesto Escobedo
January 11	France F1 Futures; Bagnoles-de-l'Orne, France; Clay $10,000; Singles and doubles draws	(Belgium) Yannik Reuter; 6–3, 6–2	(France) Constant Lestienne	(France) Corentin Denolly (France) Thomas Giraudeau	(France) Grégoire Jacq (France) Alexandre Sidorenko (France) Samuel Bensoussan (Latvia) Mārtiņš Podžus
January 11	France F1 Futures; Bagnoles-de-l'Orne, France; Clay $10,000; Singles and doubles draws	(France) Corentin Denolly (France) Alexandre Müller; 2–6, 6–1, [10–6]	(France) Benjamin Bonzi (France) Grégoire Jacq	(France) Corentin Denolly (France) Thomas Giraudeau	(France) Grégoire Jacq (France) Alexandre Sidorenko (France) Samuel Bensoussan (Latvia) Mārtiņš Podžus
January 11	Germany F1 Futures; Schwieberdingen, Germany; Carpet $10,000; Singles and doubles draws	(Germany) Daniel Masur; 7–6^{(12–10)}, 6–7^{(11–13)}, 7–6^{(7–5)}	(Germany) Andreas Beck	(Czech Republic) Petr Michnev (Germany) Kevin Krawietz	(Turkey) Cem İlkel (Germany) Oscar Otte (Germany) Dominik Böhler (Germany) Jan Choinski
January 11	Germany F1 Futures; Schwieberdingen, Germany; Carpet $10,000; Singles and doubles draws	(Switzerland) Antoine Bellier (France) Hugo Grenier; 6–4, 7–6^{(9–7)}	(Germany) Andreas Mies (Germany) Oscar Otte	(Czech Republic) Petr Michnev (Germany) Kevin Krawietz	(Turkey) Cem İlkel (Germany) Oscar Otte (Germany) Dominik Böhler (Germany) Jan Choinski
January 11	Tunisia F1 Futures; Hammamet, Tunisia; Clay $10,000; Singles and doubles draws	(Portugal) Pedro Sousa; 6–0, 1–2, retired	(France) Jordan Ubiergo	(Italy) Marco Bortolotti (Germany) Jeremy Jahn	(Italy) Riccardo Bonadio (Italy) Fabrizio Ornago (United Kingdom) Marcus Willis (Sweden) Markus Eriksson
January 11	Tunisia F1 Futures; Hammamet, Tunisia; Clay $10,000; Singles and doubles draws	(Germany) Stephan Hoiss (Germany) Jeremy Jahn; 6–4, 6–1	(Portugal) Frederico Gil (Portugal) Pedro Sousa	(Italy) Marco Bortolotti (Germany) Jeremy Jahn	(Italy) Riccardo Bonadio (Italy) Fabrizio Ornago (United Kingdom) Marcus Willis (Sweden) Markus Eriksson
January 11	Turkey F2 Futures; Antalya, Turkey; Hard $10,000; Singles and doubles draws	(Ukraine) Vadym Ursu; 6–0, 6–4	(Croatia) Mate Delić	(Sweden) Daniel Windahl (Turkey) Altuğ Çelikbilek	(Bosnia and Herzegovina) Nerman Fatić (Ukraine) Vadim Alekseenko (France) Jules Okala (Czech Republic) Michal Konečný
January 11	Turkey F2 Futures; Antalya, Turkey; Hard $10,000; Singles and doubles draws	(Sweden) Lucas Renard (Sweden) Daniel Windahl; 6–4, 6–1	(Turkey) Muhammet Haylaz (Turkey) Anıl Yüksel	(Sweden) Daniel Windahl (Turkey) Altuğ Çelikbilek	(Bosnia and Herzegovina) Nerman Fatić (Ukraine) Vadim Alekseenko (France) Jules Okala (Czech Republic) Michal Konečný
January 11	United States F3 Futures; Plantation, USA; Clay $10,000; Singles and doubles draws	(United States) Tommy Paul; 7–6^{(7–4)}, 6–0	(France) Adrien Puget	(South Korea) Kim Young-seok (Japan) Kaichi Uchida	(Spain) Jaume Pla Malfeito (Ecuador) Diego Hidalgo (Peru) Mauricio Echazú (United States) Alfredo Perez
January 11	United States F3 Futures; Plantation, USA; Clay $10,000; Singles and doubles draws	(Serbia) Denis Bejtulahi (Serbia) Nikola Ćaćić; 3–6, 6–3, [10–7]	(United States) Nick Chappell (United States) Raleigh Smith	(South Korea) Kim Young-seok (Japan) Kaichi Uchida	(Spain) Jaume Pla Malfeito (Ecuador) Diego Hidalgo (Peru) Mauricio Echazú (United States) Alfredo Perez
January 18	Kazakhstan F1 Futures; Aktobe, Kazakhstan; Hard $25,000; Singles and doubles draws	(Russia) Evgenii Tiurnev; 7–6^{(25–23)}, 6–3	(Serbia) Danilo Petrović	(Russia) Mikhail Ledovskikh (Belarus) Andrei Vasilevski	(Serbia) Ivan Bjelica (South Korea) Lim Yong-kyu (China) Gao Xin (Czech Republic) Dušan Lojda
January 18	Kazakhstan F1 Futures; Aktobe, Kazakhstan; Hard $25,000; Singles and doubles draws	(Belarus) Yaraslav Shyla (Belarus) Andrei Vasilevski; 6–3, 6–2	(Russia) Evgeny Karlovskiy (Russia) Denis Matsukevich	(Russia) Mikhail Ledovskikh (Belarus) Andrei Vasilevski	(Serbia) Ivan Bjelica (South Korea) Lim Yong-kyu (China) Gao Xin (Czech Republic) Dušan Lojda
January 18	Egypt F1 Futures; Sharm El Sheikh, Egypt; Hard $10,000; Singles and doubles draws	(Egypt) Mohamed Safwat; 6–3, 7–5	(Spain) Enrique López Pérez	(Portugal) Romain Barbosa (Belgium) Julien Dubail	(Italy) Luca Pancaldi (Italy) Manuel Mazzella (Latvia) Artūrs Lazdiņš (Italy) Antonio Massara
January 18	Egypt F1 Futures; Sharm El Sheikh, Egypt; Hard $10,000; Singles and doubles draws	(Serbia) Darko Jandrić (Spain) Enrique López Pérez; 6–3, 6–4	(Lithuania) Lukas Mugevičius (Egypt) Mohamed Safwat	(Portugal) Romain Barbosa (Belgium) Julien Dubail	(Italy) Luca Pancaldi (Italy) Manuel Mazzella (Latvia) Artūrs Lazdiņš (Italy) Antonio Massara
January 18	France F2 Futures; Bressuire, France; Hard $10,000; Singles and doubles draws	(France) Constant Lestienne; 6–7^{(4–7)}, 6–1, 6–4	(France) Hugo Nys	(France) Alexandre Sidorenko (Switzerland) Yann Marti	(France) Matthieu Roy (France) Hugo Grenier (Netherlands) Antal van der Duim (Latvia) Mārtiņš Podžus
January 18	France F2 Futures; Bressuire, France; Hard $10,000; Singles and doubles draws	(Belgium) Sander Gillé (Belgium) Joran Vliegen; 7–6^{(7–1)}, 7–5,	(France) Benjamin Bonzi (France) Grégoire Jacq	(France) Alexandre Sidorenko (Switzerland) Yann Marti	(France) Matthieu Roy (France) Hugo Grenier (Netherlands) Antal van der Duim (Latvia) Mārtiņš Podžus
January 18	Germany F2 Futures; Kaarst, Germany; Carpet $10,000; Singles and doubles draws	(Germany) Mats Moraing; 6–1, 7–6^{(8–6)}	(Croatia) Filip Veger	(Germany) Andreas Beck (Germany) Daniel Altmaier	(Germany) Robin Kern (Germany) Vincent Jänsch-Müller (Czech Republic) Zdeněk Kolář (Germany) Johannes Härteis
January 18	Germany F2 Futures; Kaarst, Germany; Carpet $10,000; Singles and doubles draws	(Ukraine) Danylo Kalenichenko (Germany) Denis Kapric; 6–7^{(2–7)}, 6–4, [10–7]	(Russia) Alexander Bublik (Poland) Hubert Hurkacz	(Germany) Andreas Beck (Germany) Daniel Altmaier	(Germany) Robin Kern (Germany) Vincent Jänsch-Müller (Czech Republic) Zdeněk Kolář (Germany) Johannes Härteis
January 18	Tunisia F2 Futures; Hammamet, Tunisia; Clay $10,000; Singles and doubles draws	(Serbia) Miljan Zekić; 6–3, 6–3	(Portugal) Pedro Sousa	(Germany) Jeremy Jahn (Spain) Albert Alcaraz Ivorra	(Italy) Walter Trusendi (Russia) Ivan Nedelko (Italy) Marco Bortolotti (Austria) Michael Linzer
January 18	Tunisia F2 Futures; Hammamet, Tunisia; Clay $10,000; Singles and doubles draws	(Sweden) Markus Eriksson (Italy) Matteo Volante; 6–2, 6–1	(North Macedonia) Tomislav Jotovski (Serbia) Miljan Zekić	(Germany) Jeremy Jahn (Spain) Albert Alcaraz Ivorra	(Italy) Walter Trusendi (Russia) Ivan Nedelko (Italy) Marco Bortolotti (Austria) Michael Linzer
January 18	Turkey F3 Futures; Antalya, Turkey; Clay $10,000; Singles and doubles draws	(Belgium) Joris De Loore; 6–2, 6–3	(Turkey) Anıl Yüksel	(Bulgaria) Dimitar Kuzmanov (Bosnia and Herzegovina) Nerman Fatić	(Spain) Jaume Munar (Japan) Yusuke Watanuki (Norway) Viktor Durasovic (Netherlands) Paul Monteban
January 18	Turkey F3 Futures; Antalya, Turkey; Clay $10,000; Singles and doubles draws	(Netherlands) Tallon Griekspoor (Netherlands) Tim van Rijthoven; 6–3, 6–1	(Slovakia) Martin Blaško (Netherlands) Paul Monteban	(Bulgaria) Dimitar Kuzmanov (Bosnia and Herzegovina) Nerman Fatić	(Spain) Jaume Munar (Japan) Yusuke Watanuki (Norway) Viktor Durasovic (Netherlands) Paul Monteban
January 18	United States F4 Futures; Sunrise, USA; Clay $10,000; Singles and doubles draws	(United States) Tommy Paul; 6–4, 3–6, 6–3	(France) Adrien Puget	(Hungary) Péter Nagy (United States) Sekou Bangoura	(Mexico) Tigre Hank (Poland) Maciej Rajski (France) Gianni Mina (United States) Wil Spencer
January 18	United States F4 Futures; Sunrise, USA; Clay $10,000; Singles and doubles draws	(Sweden) Isak Arvidsson (Japan) Kaichi Uchida; 6–4, 6–4	(Hungary) Péter Nagy (Canada) Denis Shapovalov	(Hungary) Péter Nagy (United States) Sekou Bangoura	(Mexico) Tigre Hank (Poland) Maciej Rajski (France) Gianni Mina (United States) Wil Spencer
January 25	Germany F3 Futures; Nußloch, Germany; Carpet $25,000; Singles and doubles draws	(Germany) Nils Langer; 6–3, 6–4	(Belgium) Niels Desein	(Belarus) Uladzimir Ignatik (Germany) Maximilian Marterer	(Russia) Alexey Vatutin (Germany) Johannes Härteis (Czech Republic) Marek Michalička (Germany) Mats Moraing
January 25	Germany F3 Futures; Nußloch, Germany; Carpet $25,000; Singles and doubles draws	(Germany) Johannes Härteis (Germany) Kevin Krawietz; 6–7^{(5–7)}, 6–4, [10–8]	(Belgium) Niels Desein (Belarus) Uladzimir Ignatik	(Belarus) Uladzimir Ignatik (Germany) Maximilian Marterer	(Russia) Alexey Vatutin (Germany) Johannes Härteis (Czech Republic) Marek Michalička (Germany) Mats Moraing
January 25	Kazakhstan F2 Futures; Aktobe, Kazakhstan; Hard $25,000; Singles and doubles draws	(Belarus) Sergey Betov; 6–3, 6–4	(Russia) Markos Kalovelonis	(Uzbekistan) Sanjar Fayziev (Russia) Pavel Kotov	(Croatia) Nino Serdarušić (Belarus) Andrei Vasilevski (Russia) Evgeny Karlovskiy (China) Ouyang Bowen
January 25	Kazakhstan F2 Futures; Aktobe, Kazakhstan; Hard $25,000; Singles and doubles draws	(Belarus) Yaraslav Shyla (Belarus) Andrei Vasilevski; 4–6, 6–4, [12–10]	(Uzbekistan) Sanjar Fayziev (Kazakhstan) Timur Khabibulin	(Uzbekistan) Sanjar Fayziev (Russia) Pavel Kotov	(Croatia) Nino Serdarušić (Belarus) Andrei Vasilevski (Russia) Evgeny Karlovskiy (China) Ouyang Bowen
January 25	Azerbaijan F1 Futures; Baku, Azerbaijan; Clay $10,000; Singles and doubles draws	(Belarus) Artur Dubinski; 7–6^{(7–2)}, 6–3	(Russia) Alexander Igoshin	(Italy) Filippo Baldi (Croatia) Borna Gojo	(Czech Republic) Michal Konečný (Serbia) Petar Čonkić (Russia) Ilya Lebedev (Czech Republic) David Poljak
January 25	Azerbaijan F1 Futures; Baku, Azerbaijan; Clay $10,000; Singles and doubles draws	(Russia) Alexander Igoshin (Russia) Yan Sabanin; 7–6^{(9–7)}, 6–4	(Italy) Filippo Baldi (Italy) Pietro Licciardi	(Italy) Filippo Baldi (Croatia) Borna Gojo	(Czech Republic) Michal Konečný (Serbia) Petar Čonkić (Russia) Ilya Lebedev (Czech Republic) David Poljak
January 25	Egypt F2 Futures; Sharm El Sheikh, Egypt; Clay $10,000; Singles and doubles draws	(Egypt) Mohamed Safwat; 6–2, 6–1	(Belgium) Julien Dubail	(Spain) Enrique López Pérez (Portugal) Romain Barbosa	(United States) Adam El Mihdawy (India) Vishnu Vardhan (Netherlands) Jesse Huta Galung (Chinese Taipei) Huang Liang-chi
January 25	Egypt F2 Futures; Sharm El Sheikh, Egypt; Clay $10,000; Singles and doubles draws	(Switzerland) Luca Margaroli (Egypt) Mohamed Safwat; 6–3, 3–6, [10–7]	(Spain) Enrique López Pérez (France) Laurent Rochette	(Spain) Enrique López Pérez (Portugal) Romain Barbosa	(United States) Adam El Mihdawy (India) Vishnu Vardhan (Netherlands) Jesse Huta Galung (Chinese Taipei) Huang Liang-chi
January 25	France F3 Futures; Veigy-Foncenex, France; Carpet $10,000; Singles and doubles draws	(France) Hugo Nys; 6–4, 6–3	(Netherlands) Antal van der Duim	(Switzerland) Yann Marti (France) Alexis Gautier	(France) Grégoire Barrère (Lithuania) Laurynas Grigelis (France) Élie Rousset (France) Albano Olivetti
January 25	France F3 Futures; Veigy-Foncenex, France; Carpet $10,000; Singles and doubles draws	(Belgium) Sander Gillé (Belgium) Joran Vliegen; 6–7, 7–6^{(8–6)}, [10–7]	(United Kingdom) Scott Clayton (United Kingdom) Richard Gabb	(Switzerland) Yann Marti (France) Alexis Gautier	(France) Grégoire Barrère (Lithuania) Laurynas Grigelis (France) Élie Rousset (France) Albano Olivetti
January 25	Spain F1 Futures; Castelldefels, Spain; Clay $10,000; Singles and doubles draws	(Spain) Gerard Granollers; 6–3, 6–1	(Canada) Steven Diez	(Spain) Ricardo Ojeda Lara (Japan) Akira Santillan	(Spain) Oriol Roca Batalla (United Kingdom) Alexander Ward (Spain) Álvaro López San Martín (Czech Republic) Libor Salaba
January 25	Spain F1 Futures; Castelldefels, Spain; Clay $10,000; Singles and doubles draws	(Bosnia and Herzegovina) Tomislav Brkić (Portugal) Gonçalo Oliveira; 6–2, 3–6, [10–1]	(France) Samuel Bensoussan (Czech Republic) Michal Schmid	(Spain) Ricardo Ojeda Lara (Japan) Akira Santillan	(Spain) Oriol Roca Batalla (United Kingdom) Alexander Ward (Spain) Álvaro López San Martín (Czech Republic) Libor Salaba
January 25	Tunisia F3 Futures; Hammamet, Tunisia; Clay $10,000; Singles and doubles draws	(Germany) Jeremy Jahn; 2–6, 6–4, 7–5	(Spain) Pol Toledo Bagué	(Serbia) Miljan Zekić (Italy) Walter Trusendi	(France) Tak Khunn Wang (Portugal) Pedro Sousa (Spain) Carlos Boluda-Purkiss (Russia) Kirill Dmitriev
January 25	Tunisia F3 Futures; Hammamet, Tunisia; Clay $10,000; Singles and doubles draws	(Portugal) Frederico Gil (Spain) Pol Toledo Bagué; 3–6, 7–6^{(7–1)}, [10–5]	(Russia) Kirill Dmitriev (Austria) David Pichler	(Serbia) Miljan Zekić (Italy) Walter Trusendi	(France) Tak Khunn Wang (Portugal) Pedro Sousa (Spain) Carlos Boluda-Purkiss (Russia) Kirill Dmitriev
January 25	Turkey F4 Futures; Antalya, Turkey; Hard $10,000; Singles and doubles draws	(Belgium) Joris De Loore; 6–4, 6–2	(South Korea) Hong Seong-chan	(Japan) Soichiro Moritani (Japan) Hiroyasu Ehara	(Turkey) Anıl Yüksel (Venezuela) Ricardo Rodríguez (Austria) Lenny Hampel (Austria) Pascal Brunner
January 25	Turkey F4 Futures; Antalya, Turkey; Hard $10,000; Singles and doubles draws	(Japan) Soichiro Moritani (Japan) Issei Okamura; 6–3, 6–4	(Italy) Riccardo Bellotti (Austria) Pascal Brunner	(Japan) Soichiro Moritani (Japan) Hiroyasu Ehara	(Turkey) Anıl Yüksel (Venezuela) Ricardo Rodríguez (Austria) Lenny Hampel (Austria) Pascal Brunner
January 25	United States F5 Futures; Weston, USA; Clay $10,000; Singles and doubles draws	(Canada) Denis Shapovalov; 7–6^{(7–2)}, 6–3	(Brazil) Pedro Sakamoto	(Japan) Kaichi Uchida (Spain) Jaume Pla Malfeito	(France) Adrien Puget (Argentina) Agustín Velotti (Argentina) Mateo Nicolás Martínez (South Korea) Kim Young-seok
January 25	United States F5 Futures; Weston, USA; Clay $10,000; Singles and doubles draws	(United States) Junior Ore (United States) Hunter Reese; 7–6^{(7–4)}, 3–6, [10–8]	(Sweden) Isak Arvidsson (Japan) Kaichi Uchida	(Japan) Kaichi Uchida (Spain) Jaume Pla Malfeito	(France) Adrien Puget (Argentina) Agustín Velotti (Argentina) Mateo Nicolás Martínez (South Korea) Kim Young-seok

=== February ===
Week of	Tournament	Winner	Runners-up	Semifinalists	Quarterfinalists
February 1	Azerbaijan F2 Futures; Baku, Azerbaijan; Carpet $10,000; Singles and doubles draws	(Russia) Victor Baluda; 7–5, 7–6^{(7–2)}	(Czech Republic) Michal Konečný	(Russia) Alexander Igoshin (Ukraine) Stanislav Poplavskyy	(Russia) Evgeny Karlovskiy (Monaco) Benjamin Balleret (Italy) Filippo Baldi (Russia) Anton Zaitcev
February 1	Azerbaijan F2 Futures; Baku, Azerbaijan; Carpet $10,000; Singles and doubles draws	(Latvia) Miķelis Lībietis (New Zealand) Ben McLachlan; 7–6^{(7–2)}, 6–7^{(2–7)}, [10–6]	(Uzbekistan) Sanjar Fayziev (Kazakhstan) Timur Khabibulin	(Russia) Alexander Igoshin (Ukraine) Stanislav Poplavskyy	(Russia) Evgeny Karlovskiy (Monaco) Benjamin Balleret (Italy) Filippo Baldi (Russia) Anton Zaitcev
February 1	Egypt F3 Futures; Sharm El Sheikh, Egypt; Hard $10,000; Singles and doubles draws	(Egypt) Karim-Mohamed Maamoun; 7–6^{(7–5)}, 2–6, 6–4	(Serbia) Nikola Milojević	(France) Laurent Rochette (South Africa) Lloyd Harris	(France) Thibault Venturino (Spain) Roberto Ortega Olmedo (Chinese Taipei) Huang Liang-chi (United Kingdom) Keelan Oakley
February 1	Egypt F3 Futures; Sharm El Sheikh, Egypt; Hard $10,000; Singles and doubles draws	(Italy) Claudio Fortuna (Lithuania) Laurynas Grigelis; 6–3, 3–6, [10–6]	(France) Laurent Rochette (France) Thibault Venturino	(France) Laurent Rochette (South Africa) Lloyd Harris	(France) Thibault Venturino (Spain) Roberto Ortega Olmedo (Chinese Taipei) Huang Liang-chi (United Kingdom) Keelan Oakley
February 1	Great Britain F1 Futures; Glasgow, Great Britain; Hard (indoor) $10,000; Singles and doubles draws	(United Kingdom) Liam Broady; 6–3, 4–6, 6–2	(Switzerland) Adrien Bossel	(Belarus) Maxim Dubarenco (Netherlands) Scott Griekspoor	(Switzerland) Yann Marti (United Kingdom) Luke Bambridge (United States) Raymond Sarmiento (France) Maxime Teixeira
February 1	Great Britain F1 Futures; Glasgow, Great Britain; Hard (indoor) $10,000; Singles and doubles draws	(United Kingdom) David Rice (United Kingdom) Daniel Smethurst; 6–1, 6–4	(United Kingdom) Scott Clayton (United Kingdom) Jonny O'Mara	(Belarus) Maxim Dubarenco (Netherlands) Scott Griekspoor	(Switzerland) Yann Marti (United Kingdom) Luke Bambridge (United States) Raymond Sarmiento (France) Maxime Teixeira
February 1	Spain F2 Futures; Peguera, Spain; Clay $10,000; Singles and doubles draws	(Canada) Steven Diez; 4–6, 6–2, 7–6^{(9–7)}	(Poland) Paweł Ciaś	(Spain) Álvaro López San Martín (Spain) Carlos Boluda-Purkiss	(Portugal) Gonçalo Oliveira (United Kingdom) Alexander Ward (Spain) Eduard Esteve Lobato (Bosnia and Herzegovina) Tomislav Brkić
February 1	Spain F2 Futures; Peguera, Spain; Clay $10,000; Singles and doubles draws	(Bosnia and Herzegovina) Tomislav Brkić (Poland) Kamil Majchrzak; 6–3, 6–4	(Spain) Carlos Taberner (Japan) Kento Yamada	(Spain) Álvaro López San Martín (Spain) Carlos Boluda-Purkiss	(Portugal) Gonçalo Oliveira (United Kingdom) Alexander Ward (Spain) Eduard Esteve Lobato (Bosnia and Herzegovina) Tomislav Brkić
February 1	Tunisia F4 Futures; Hammamet, Tunisia; Clay $10,000; Singles and doubles draws	(Germany) Jeremy Jahn; 4–6, 7–6^{(7–5)}, 6–4	(Portugal) Pedro Sousa	(Portugal) André Gaspar Murta (Argentina) Federico Coria	(Russia) Ivan Nedelko (Portugal) Rui Machado (Austria) Gibril Diarra (South Korea) Kim Cheong-eui
February 1	Tunisia F4 Futures; Hammamet, Tunisia; Clay $10,000; Singles and doubles draws	(Portugal) Gonçalo Falcão (Portugal) Frederico Gil; 6–4, 6–3	(Portugal) João Domingues (Portugal) Diogo Lourenço	(Portugal) André Gaspar Murta (Argentina) Federico Coria	(Russia) Ivan Nedelko (Portugal) Rui Machado (Austria) Gibril Diarra (South Korea) Kim Cheong-eui
February 1	Turkey F5 Futures; Antalya, Turkey; Hard $10,000; Singles and doubles draws	(South Korea) Hong Seong-chan; 6–2, 7–5	(Russia) Roman Safiullin	(Israel) Bar Tzuf Botzer (Netherlands) Miliaan Niesten	(Lithuania) Lukas Mugevičius (Belgium) Germain Gigounon (Austria) Lenny Hampel (Italy) Riccardo Bellotti
February 1	Turkey F5 Futures; Antalya, Turkey; Hard $10,000; Singles and doubles draws	(Japan) Soichiro Moritani (Japan) Issei Okamura; 6–2, 6–2	(Italy) Riccardo Bellotti (Austria) Lenny Hampel	(Israel) Bar Tzuf Botzer (Netherlands) Miliaan Niesten	(Lithuania) Lukas Mugevičius (Belgium) Germain Gigounon (Austria) Lenny Hampel (Italy) Riccardo Bellotti
February 1	United States F6 Futures; Palm Coast, USA; Clay $10,000; Singles and doubles draws	(Argentina) Agustín Velotti; 6–4, 4–6, 6–3	(Chile) Juan Carlos Sáez	(Belgium) Clément Geens (Argentina) Facundo Mena	(Brazil) Pedro Sakamoto (South Korea) Kim Young-seok (Australia) Jason Kubler (Belgium) Omar Salman
February 1	United States F6 Futures; Palm Coast, USA; Clay $10,000; Singles and doubles draws	(Chile) Nicolás Jarry (Chile) Juan Carlos Sáez; 6–1, 6–2	(Hungary) Péter Nagy (United States) Wil Spencer	(Belgium) Clément Geens (Argentina) Facundo Mena	(Brazil) Pedro Sakamoto (South Korea) Kim Young-seok (Australia) Jason Kubler (Belgium) Omar Salman
February 8	Switzerland F1 Futures; Oberentfelden, Switzerland; Carpet $25,000; Singles and doubles draws	(Belarus) Uladzimir Ignatik; 6–4, 6–3	(Germany) Jan Choinski	(Belarus) Ilya Ivashka (Switzerland) Yann Marti	(Canada) Frank Dancevic (Germany) Daniel Altmaier (Netherlands) Niels Lootsma (Russia) Daniil Medvedev
February 8	Switzerland F1 Futures; Oberentfelden, Switzerland; Carpet $25,000; Singles and doubles draws	(Belgium) Niels Desein (Russia) Denis Matsukevich; 6–0, 6–4	(France) Sébastien Boltz (France) Grégoire Jacq	(Belarus) Ilya Ivashka (Switzerland) Yann Marti	(Canada) Frank Dancevic (Germany) Daniel Altmaier (Netherlands) Niels Lootsma (Russia) Daniil Medvedev
February 8	Azerbaijan F3 Futures; Baku, Azerbaijan; Carpet $10,000; Singles and doubles draws	(Latvia) Miķelis Lībietis; 6–3, 6–2	(Kazakhstan) Timur Khabibulin	(Czech Republic) Michal Konečný (Russia) Evgeny Karlovskiy	(Russia) Ilya Lebedev (Belarus) Artur Dubinski (Russia) Anton Zaitcev (Slovakia) Peter Vajda
February 8	Azerbaijan F3 Futures; Baku, Azerbaijan; Carpet $10,000; Singles and doubles draws	(Russia) Alexander Igoshin (Russia) Evgeny Karlovskiy; 6–1, 6–4	(United Kingdom) Joe Cooper (Czech Republic) Michal Konečný	(Czech Republic) Michal Konečný (Russia) Evgeny Karlovskiy	(Russia) Ilya Lebedev (Belarus) Artur Dubinski (Russia) Anton Zaitcev (Slovakia) Peter Vajda
February 8	Egypt F4 Futures; Sharm El Sheikh, Egypt; Hard $10,000; Singles and doubles draws	(Serbia) Nikola Milojević; 6–2, 6–4	(France) Laurent Rochette	(South Africa) Lloyd Harris (India) Sriram Balaji	(Egypt) Karim-Mohamed Maamoun (France) Thibault Venturino (Spain) Roberto Ortega Olmedo (United States) Adam El Mihdawy
February 8	Egypt F4 Futures; Sharm El Sheikh, Egypt; Hard $10,000; Singles and doubles draws	(Italy) Claudio Fortuna (Lithuania) Laurynas Grigelis; 6–3, 7–6^{(7–5)}	(Czech Republic) Tomáš Papík (Czech Republic) Pavel Štaubert	(South Africa) Lloyd Harris (India) Sriram Balaji	(Egypt) Karim-Mohamed Maamoun (France) Thibault Venturino (Spain) Roberto Ortega Olmedo (United States) Adam El Mihdawy
February 8	Great Britain F2 Futures; Sunderland, Great Britain; Hard (indoor) $10,000; Singles and doubles draws	(Republic of Ireland) Sam Barry; 4–6, 6–3, 7–6^{(7–3)}	(France) Maxime Teixeira	(Belarus) Maxim Dubarenco (United Kingdom) Lloyd Glasspool	(Poland) Hubert Hurkacz (Sweden) Milos Sekulic (United Kingdom) Richard Gabb (United States) Raymond Sarmiento
February 8	Great Britain F2 Futures; Sunderland, Great Britain; Hard (indoor) $10,000; Singles and doubles draws	(Italy) Andrea Vavassori (Germany) George von Massow; 7–5, 6–3	(United Kingdom) Lloyd Glasspool (United Kingdom) Joshua Ward-Hibbert	(Belarus) Maxim Dubarenco (United Kingdom) Lloyd Glasspool	(Poland) Hubert Hurkacz (Sweden) Milos Sekulic (United Kingdom) Richard Gabb (United States) Raymond Sarmiento
February 8	Israel F1 Futures; Ramat Gan, Israel; Hard $10,000; Singles and doubles draws	(France) Yannick Jankovits; 6–3, 6–4	(Italy) Matteo Viola	(Israel) Amir Weintraub (Austria) Sebastian Ofner	(Portugal) Romain Barbosa (United States) Alexios Halebian (Netherlands) Antal van der Duim (Belgium) Julien Dubail
February 8	Israel F1 Futures; Ramat Gan, Israel; Hard $10,000; Singles and doubles draws	(France) Laurent Lokoli (France) Fabien Reboul; 6–3, 7–5	(Germany) Peter Heller (Spain) Jaime Pulgar García	(Israel) Amir Weintraub (Austria) Sebastian Ofner	(Portugal) Romain Barbosa (United States) Alexios Halebian (Netherlands) Antal van der Duim (Belgium) Julien Dubail
February 8	Spain F3 Futures; Peguera, Spain; Clay $10,000; Singles and doubles draws	(Norway) Casper Ruud; 2–6, 7–6^{(13–11)}, 6–0	(Spain) Carlos Taberner	(Poland) Kamil Majchrzak (Australia) Alex de Minaur	(Portugal) Gonçalo Oliveira (Spain) Mario Vilella Martínez (France) Maxime Hamou (Spain) Ricardo Ojeda Lara
February 8	Spain F3 Futures; Peguera, Spain; Clay $10,000; Singles and doubles draws	(Bosnia and Herzegovina) Tomislav Brkić (Portugal) Gonçalo Oliveira; 6–7^{(6–8)}, 6–3, [10–6]	(Italy) Pietro Rondoni (Italy) Jacopo Stefanini	(Poland) Kamil Majchrzak (Australia) Alex de Minaur	(Portugal) Gonçalo Oliveira (Spain) Mario Vilella Martínez (France) Maxime Hamou (Spain) Ricardo Ojeda Lara
February 8	Tunisia F5 Futures; Hammamet, Tunisia; Clay $10,000; Singles and doubles draws	(Russia) Ivan Nedelko; 6–0, 7–5	(Spain) Pol Toledo Bagué	(Portugal) João Domingues (Serbia) Miki Janković	(India) Sasikumar Mukund (Russia) Alexey Vatutin (Portugal) Frederico Gil (Italy) Riccardo Bonadio
February 8	Tunisia F5 Futures; Hammamet, Tunisia; Clay $10,000; Singles and doubles draws	(Venezuela) Jordi Muñoz Abreu (Spain) David Pérez Sanz; 7–5, 6–3	(Russia) Kirill Dmitriev (Russia) Alexey Vatutin	(Portugal) João Domingues (Serbia) Miki Janković	(India) Sasikumar Mukund (Russia) Alexey Vatutin (Portugal) Frederico Gil (Italy) Riccardo Bonadio
February 8	Turkey F6 Futures; Antalya, Turkey; Hard $10,000; Singles and doubles draws	(South Korea) Hong Seong-chan; 7–5, 6–4	(Portugal) Frederico Ferreira Silva	(Russia) Alexander Bublik (Russia) Roman Safiullin	(Croatia) Duje Kekez (Austria) Lenny Hampel (South Korea) Lim Yong-kyu (Japan) Issei Okamura
February 8	Turkey F6 Futures; Antalya, Turkey; Hard $10,000; Singles and doubles draws	(Slovakia) Lukáš Klein (Slovakia) Alex Molčan; 7–6^{(9–7)}, 7–6^{(7–5)}	(Ukraine) Vadim Alekseenko (Portugal) Frederico Ferreira Silva	(Russia) Alexander Bublik (Russia) Roman Safiullin	(Croatia) Duje Kekez (Austria) Lenny Hampel (South Korea) Lim Yong-kyu (Japan) Issei Okamura
February 15	Switzerland F2 Futures; Trimbach, Switzerland; Carpet $25,000; Singles and doubles draws	(Russia) Daniil Medvedev; 6–1, 6–3	(Switzerland) Adrien Bossel	(Switzerland) Yann Marti (Netherlands) Niels Lootsma	(Switzerland) Henri Laaksonen (Belarus) Ilya Ivashka (France) Enzo Couacaud (Germany) Kevin Krawietz
February 15	Switzerland F2 Futures; Trimbach, Switzerland; Carpet $25,000; Singles and doubles draws	(Belarus) Uladzimir Ignatik (Slovakia) Adrian Sikora; 6–4, 5–7, [10–7]	(Germany) Johannes Härteis (Germany) Kevin Krawietz	(Switzerland) Yann Marti (Netherlands) Niels Lootsma	(Switzerland) Henri Laaksonen (Belarus) Ilya Ivashka (France) Enzo Couacaud (Germany) Kevin Krawietz
February 15	China F1 Futures; Anning, China; Clay $10,000; Singles and doubles draws	(Serbia) Miljan Zekić; 6–4, 6–4	(Spain) Enrique López Pérez	(Colombia) Cristian Rodríguez (Germany) Sami Reinwein	(China) Wu Di (France) Jordan Ubiergo (Vietnam) Lý Hoàng Nam (Thailand) Wishaya Trongcharoenchaikul
February 15	China F1 Futures; Anning, China; Clay $10,000; Singles and doubles draws	(China) Gao Xin (China) Ouyang Bowen; 7–5, 6–3	(Colombia) Cristian Rodríguez (France) Tak Khunn Wang	(Colombia) Cristian Rodríguez (Germany) Sami Reinwein	(China) Wu Di (France) Jordan Ubiergo (Vietnam) Lý Hoàng Nam (Thailand) Wishaya Trongcharoenchaikul
February 15	Egypt F5 Futures; Sharm El Sheikh, Egypt; Hard $10,000; Singles and doubles draws	(France) Gleb Sakharov; 6–0, 4–6, 7–6^{(7–4)}	(Italy) Antonio Massara	(Egypt) Karim-Mohamed Maamoun (Czech Republic) Tomáš Papík	(Kazakhstan) Denis Yevseyev (Italy) Matteo Fago (Czech Republic) Libor Salaba (Czech Republic) Michal Schmid
February 15	Egypt F5 Futures; Sharm El Sheikh, Egypt; Hard $10,000; Singles and doubles draws	(France) Gleb Sakharov (Czech Republic) Michal Schmid; 6–3, 6–3	(Egypt) Karim-Mohamed Maamoun (Czech Republic) Libor Salaba	(Egypt) Karim-Mohamed Maamoun (Czech Republic) Tomáš Papík	(Kazakhstan) Denis Yevseyev (Italy) Matteo Fago (Czech Republic) Libor Salaba (Czech Republic) Michal Schmid
February 15	Great Britain F3 Futures; Shrewsbury, Great Britain; Hard (indoor) $10,000; Singles and doubles draws	(Germany) Yannick Maden; 3–6, 7–5, 7–6^{(7–1)}	(United Kingdom) Edward Corrie	(United Kingdom) James Marsalek (United Kingdom) Daniel Cox	(United Kingdom) Luke Bambridge (Sweden) Daniel Windahl (Italy) Stefano Napolitano (United Kingdom) Liam Broady
February 15	Great Britain F3 Futures; Shrewsbury, Great Britain; Hard (indoor) $10,000; Singles and doubles draws	(United Kingdom) Edward Corrie (United Kingdom) Daniel Smethurst; 6–1, 6–3	(United Kingdom) Jonathan Gray (United Kingdom) Stefan Sterland-Markovic	(United Kingdom) James Marsalek (United Kingdom) Daniel Cox	(United Kingdom) Luke Bambridge (Sweden) Daniel Windahl (Italy) Stefano Napolitano (United Kingdom) Liam Broady
February 15	Israel F2 Futures; Ramat Gan, Israel; Hard $10,000; Singles and doubles draws	(Israel) Amir Weintraub; 6–4, 6–1	(France) Yannick Jankovits	(Netherlands) Antal van der Duim (Italy) Matteo Viola	(Germany) Jonas Lütjen (Russia) Alexander Boborykin (Belgium) Julien Dubail (France) Alexandre Müller
February 15	Israel F2 Futures; Ramat Gan, Israel; Hard $10,000; Singles and doubles draws	(Russia) Evgeny Elistratov (Russia) Vitaly Kozyukov; 6–1, 6–0	(Netherlands) Paul Monteban (Netherlands) Antal van der Duim	(Netherlands) Antal van der Duim (Italy) Matteo Viola	(Germany) Jonas Lütjen (Russia) Alexander Boborykin (Belgium) Julien Dubail (France) Alexandre Müller
February 15	Spain F4 Futures; Murcia, Spain; Clay $10,000; Singles and doubles draws	(Canada) Steven Diez; 6–3, 6–4	(Australia) Alex de Minaur	(Belgium) Arthur De Greef (France) Samuel Bensoussan	(Spain) Ricardo Ojeda Lara (Romania) Dragoș Dima (Spain) Alejandro Ibañez Gallego (United Kingdom) Billy Harris
February 15	Spain F4 Futures; Murcia, Spain; Clay $10,000; Singles and doubles draws	(Romania) Vasile Antonescu (Romania) Alexandru Jecan; 4–6, 7–5, [11–9]	(Spain) Adria Mas Mascolo (Spain) David Vega Hernández	(Belgium) Arthur De Greef (France) Samuel Bensoussan	(Spain) Ricardo Ojeda Lara (Romania) Dragoș Dima (Spain) Alejandro Ibañez Gallego (United Kingdom) Billy Harris
February 15	Tunisia F6 Futures; Hammamet, Tunisia; Clay $10,000; Singles and doubles draws	(Serbia) Laslo Djere; 1–6, 6–1, 7–6^{(7–5)}	(Austria) Pascal Brunner	(Italy) Marco Bortolotti (Russia) Alexey Vatutin	(Chile) Cristóbal Saavedra (Serbia) Miki Janković (India) Sumit Nagal (Spain) David Pérez Sanz
February 15	Tunisia F6 Futures; Hammamet, Tunisia; Clay $10,000; Singles and doubles draws	(Italy) Riccardo Bonadio (Argentina) Mariano Kestelboim; 6–1, 2–6, [10–4]	(Italy) Walter Trusendi (Italy) Matteo Volante	(Italy) Marco Bortolotti (Russia) Alexey Vatutin	(Chile) Cristóbal Saavedra (Serbia) Miki Janković (India) Sumit Nagal (Spain) David Pérez Sanz
February 15	Turkey F7 Futures; Antalya, Turkey; Hard $10,000; Singles and doubles draws	(South Korea) Hong Seong-chan; 6–4, 6–3	(Bulgaria) Dimitar Kuzmanov	(Netherlands) Tallon Griekspoor (Portugal) Frederico Ferreira Silva	(South Korea) Chung Yun-seong (Germany) Oscar Otte (South Korea) Lim Yong-kyu (Turkey) Barkın Yalçınkale
February 15	Turkey F7 Futures; Antalya, Turkey; Hard $10,000; Singles and doubles draws	(South Korea) Lim Yong-kyu (South Korea) Seol Jae-min; 6–4, 7–6^{(8–6)}	(Germany) Tom Schönenberg (Germany) Marc Sieber	(Netherlands) Tallon Griekspoor (Portugal) Frederico Ferreira Silva	(South Korea) Chung Yun-seong (Germany) Oscar Otte (South Korea) Lim Yong-kyu (Turkey) Barkın Yalçınkale
February 15	United States F7 Futures; Plantation, USA; Clay $10,000; Singles and doubles draws	(Chile) Juan Carlos Sáez; 6–3, 2–6, 7–6^{(7–5)}	(Romania) Victor Hănescu	(Japan) Kaichi Uchida (Argentina) Facundo Mena	(Argentina) Andrea Collarini (Colombia) Juan Manuel Benítez (United States) Stefan Kozlov (Chile) Gonzalo Lama
February 15	United States F7 Futures; Plantation, USA; Clay $10,000; Singles and doubles draws	(Argentina) Patricio Heras (Brazil) Caio Zampieri; 7–6^{(7–4)}, 6–1	(South Africa) Damon Gooch (United States) Junior Ore	(Japan) Kaichi Uchida (Argentina) Facundo Mena	(Argentina) Andrea Collarini (Colombia) Juan Manuel Benítez (United States) Stefan Kozlov (Chile) Gonzalo Lama
February 22	Australia F1 Futures; Port Pirie, Australia; Hard $25,000; Singles and doubles draws	(Australia) Christopher O'Connell; 7–6^{(8–6)}, 3–6, 6–2	(Australia) Blake Mott	(New Zealand) Jose Rubin Statham (Australia) Marc Polmans	(Australia) Daniel Nolan (Australia) Dayne Kelly (Australia) Maverick Banes (Australia) Andrew Whittington
February 22	Australia F1 Futures; Port Pirie, Australia; Hard $25,000; Singles and doubles draws	(Australia) Alex Bolt (Australia) Andrew Whittington; 7–6^{(7–1)}, 6–3	(Australia) Marc Polmans (New Zealand) Jose Rubin Statham	(New Zealand) Jose Rubin Statham (Australia) Marc Polmans	(Australia) Daniel Nolan (Australia) Dayne Kelly (Australia) Maverick Banes (Australia) Andrew Whittington
February 22	China F2 Futures; Anning, China; Clay $10,000; Singles and doubles draws	(Spain) Enrique López Pérez; 6–3, 6–3	(Serbia) Miljan Zekić	(Japan) Jumpei Yamasaki (Chinese Taipei) Lee Kuan-yi	(France) Gabriel Petit (France) Tak Khunn Wang (France) Jordan Ubiergo (China) Wang Chuhan
February 22	China F2 Futures; Anning, China; Clay $10,000; Singles and doubles draws	(Chinese Taipei) Lin Hsin (Spain) Enrique López Pérez; Walkover	(China) Sun Fajing (China) Wang Aoran	(Japan) Jumpei Yamasaki (Chinese Taipei) Lee Kuan-yi	(France) Gabriel Petit (France) Tak Khunn Wang (France) Jordan Ubiergo (China) Wang Chuhan
February 22	Egypt F6 Futures; Sharm El Sheikh, Egypt; Hard $10,000; Singles and doubles draws	(Serbia) Marko Tepavac; 6–4, 6–7^{(8–10)}, 7–5	(Czech Republic) Jaroslav Pospíšil	(Egypt) Mohamed Safwat (France) Gleb Sakharov	(Italy) Antonio Massara (Czech Republic) Tomáš Papík (United Kingdom) Evan Hoyt (Egypt) Karim-Mohamed Maamoun
February 22	Egypt F6 Futures; Sharm El Sheikh, Egypt; Hard $10,000; Singles and doubles draws	(Egypt) Karim-Mohamed Maamoun (Egypt) Mohamed Safwat; 6–3, 5–7, [10–8]	(Italy) Federico Bonacia (Italy) Matteo Fago	(Egypt) Mohamed Safwat (France) Gleb Sakharov	(Italy) Antonio Massara (Czech Republic) Tomáš Papík (United Kingdom) Evan Hoyt (Egypt) Karim-Mohamed Maamoun
February 22	Israel F3 Futures; Ramat Gan, Israel; Hard $10,000; Singles and doubles draws	(France) Antoine Escoffier; 5–7, 6–4, 6–4	(Belgium) Julien Dubail	(Germany) Peter Heller (Netherlands) Antal van der Duim	(Israel) Tal Goldengoren (Russia) Evgeny Elistratov (Russia) Vitaly Kozyukov (Belgium) Jonas Merckx
February 22	Israel F3 Futures; Ramat Gan, Israel; Hard $10,000; Singles and doubles draws	(Latvia) Miķelis Lībietis (New Zealand) Ben McLachlan; 3–6, 7–6^{(7–3)}, [12–10]	(United States) Alexios Halebian (United States) Ryan Lipman	(Germany) Peter Heller (Netherlands) Antal van der Duim	(Israel) Tal Goldengoren (Russia) Evgeny Elistratov (Russia) Vitaly Kozyukov (Belgium) Jonas Merckx
February 22	Portugal F1 Futures; Vale do Lobo, Portugal; Hard $10,000; Singles and doubles draws	(Netherlands) Jesse Huta Galung; 6–4, 5–7, 6–2	(Spain) Roberto Ortega Olmedo	(Spain) Pablo Vivero González (Portugal) João Domingues	(France) Thomas Bréchemier (Poland) Hubert Hurkacz (Portugal) Rui Machado (France) Adrien Puget
February 22	Portugal F1 Futures; Vale do Lobo, Portugal; Hard $10,000; Singles and doubles draws	(Spain) Iván Arenas-Gualda (Spain) Roberto Ortega Olmedo; 4–6, 7–6^{(7–4)}, [10–6]	(Spain) Carlos Boluda-Purkiss (Spain) David Vega Hernández	(Spain) Pablo Vivero González (Portugal) João Domingues	(France) Thomas Bréchemier (Poland) Hubert Hurkacz (Portugal) Rui Machado (France) Adrien Puget
February 22	Spain F5 Futures; Cartagena, Spain; Clay $10,000; Singles and doubles draws	(Chile) Cristian Garín; 6–4, 6–2	(Spain) Oriol Roca Batalla	(Japan) Akira Santillan (France) Maxime Chazal	(Belgium) Arthur De Greef (Canada) Steven Diez (Romania) Vasile Antonescu (Spain) Ricardo Ojeda Lara
February 22	Spain F5 Futures; Cartagena, Spain; Clay $10,000; Singles and doubles draws	(Romania) Vasile Antonescu (Romania) Alexandru Jecan; 6–4, 6–1	(Spain) Carlos Taberner (Japan) Kento Yamada	(Japan) Akira Santillan (France) Maxime Chazal	(Belgium) Arthur De Greef (Canada) Steven Diez (Romania) Vasile Antonescu (Spain) Ricardo Ojeda Lara
February 22	Tunisia F7 Futures; Hammamet, Tunisia; Clay $10,000; Singles and doubles draws	(Russia) Alexey Vatutin; 6–4, 6–1	(Austria) Michael Linzer	(Serbia) Laslo Djere (India) Sumit Nagal	(Chile) Bastián Malla (Italy) Walter Trusendi (Chile) Cristóbal Saavedra (Brazil) Bruno Sant'Anna
February 22	Tunisia F7 Futures; Hammamet, Tunisia; Clay $10,000; Singles and doubles draws	(Venezuela) Jordi Muñoz Abreu (Spain) David Pérez Sanz; 6–1, 6–3	(Portugal) Vasco Mensurado (Russia) Alexander Zhurbin	(Serbia) Laslo Djere (India) Sumit Nagal	(Chile) Bastián Malla (Italy) Walter Trusendi (Chile) Cristóbal Saavedra (Brazil) Bruno Sant'Anna
February 22	Turkey F8 Futures; Antalya, Turkey; Hard $10,000; Singles and doubles draws	(Russia) Roman Safiullin; 3–6, 7–5, 7–5	(Bulgaria) Dimitar Kuzmanov	(Belgium) Christopher Heyman (South Africa) Nicolaas Scholtz	(Netherlands) Scott Griekspoor (Turkey) Muhammet Haylaz (Bulgaria) Alexandar Lazov (Turkey) Anıl Yüksel
February 22	Turkey F8 Futures; Antalya, Turkey; Hard $10,000; Singles and doubles draws	(Turkey) Sarp Ağabigün (Czech Republic) Marek Michalička; 4–6, 6–3, [11–9]	(Turkey) Tuna Altuna (Turkey) Altuğ Çelikbilek	(Belgium) Christopher Heyman (South Africa) Nicolaas Scholtz	(Netherlands) Scott Griekspoor (Turkey) Muhammet Haylaz (Bulgaria) Alexandar Lazov (Turkey) Anıl Yüksel
February 22	United States F8 Futures; Plantation, USA; Clay $10,000; Singles and doubles draws	(Argentina) Andrea Collarini; 6–3, 7–6^{(7–3)}	(United States) Noah Rubin	(France) Jonathan Eysseric (Australia) Jason Kubler	(Argentina) Agustín Velotti (Sweden) Christian Lindell (Argentina) Juan Pablo Ficovich (Ecuador) Roberto Quiroz
February 22	United States F8 Futures; Plantation, USA; Clay $10,000; Singles and doubles draws	(Brazil) Fernando Romboli (Brazil) Caio Zampieri; Walkover	(United States) Evan Zhu (United States) Michael Zhu	(France) Jonathan Eysseric (Australia) Jason Kubler	(Argentina) Agustín Velotti (Sweden) Christian Lindell (Argentina) Juan Pablo Ficovich (Ecuador) Roberto Quiroz
February 29	Australia F2 Futures; Mildura, Australia; Grass $25,000; Singles and doubles draws	(Australia) Dayne Kelly; 6–4, 6–2	(Australia) Greg Jones	(Australia) Luke Saville (Australia) Gavin van Peperzeel	(Australia) Bradley Mousley (Australia) Maverick Banes (Australia) Alex Bolt (Australia) Steven de Waard
February 29	Australia F2 Futures; Mildura, Australia; Grass $25,000; Singles and doubles draws	(Australia) Steven de Waard (Australia) Marc Polmans; 6–3, 6–7^{(7–9)}, [10–6]	(Australia) Alex Bolt (Australia) Andrew Whittington	(Australia) Luke Saville (Australia) Gavin van Peperzeel	(Australia) Bradley Mousley (Australia) Maverick Banes (Australia) Alex Bolt (Australia) Steven de Waard
February 29	Canada F1 Futures; Gatineau, Canada; Hard (indoor) $25,000; Singles and doubles draws	(United States) Alex Kuznetsov; 7–5, 6–3	(Netherlands) Tim van Rijthoven	(United Kingdom) Edward Corrie (United Kingdom) Liam Broady	(United States) Deiton Baughman (United States) Eric Quigley (United States) Stefan Kozlov (United States) Alexios Halebian
February 29	Canada F1 Futures; Gatineau, Canada; Hard (indoor) $25,000; Singles and doubles draws	(United States) Stefan Kozlov (Japan) Kaichi Uchida; 7–6^{(7–5)}, 6–3	(Germany) Sebastian Fanselow (Slovakia) Adrian Sikora	(United Kingdom) Edward Corrie (United Kingdom) Liam Broady	(United States) Deiton Baughman (United States) Eric Quigley (United States) Stefan Kozlov (United States) Alexios Halebian
February 29	France F4 Futures; Lille, France; Hard (indoor) $25,000; Singles and doubles draws	(Belgium) Yannick Mertens; 6–2, 6–4	(Netherlands) Antal van der Duim	(Belgium) Julien Cagnina (Germany) Andreas Beck	(France) Fabien Reboul (Russia) Daniil Medvedev (Russia) Alexey Vatutin (Italy) Lorenzo Giustino
February 29	France F4 Futures; Lille, France; Hard (indoor) $25,000; Singles and doubles draws	(Russia) Denis Matsukevich (Russia) Daniil Medvedev; 7–6^{(7–5)}, 4–6, [11–9]	(Netherlands) David Pel (Netherlands) Antal van der Duim	(Belgium) Julien Cagnina (Germany) Andreas Beck	(France) Fabien Reboul (Russia) Daniil Medvedev (Russia) Alexey Vatutin (Italy) Lorenzo Giustino
February 29	China F3 Futures; Anning, China; Clay $10,000; Singles and doubles draws	(Spain) Enrique López Pérez; 6–4, 7–6^{(7–4)}	(South Korea) Kim Young-seok	(Germany) Sami Reinwein (Serbia) Miljan Zekić	(Chinese Taipei) Lee Kuan-yi (France) Jordan Ubiergo (United States) Alexander Centenari (Colombia) Cristian Rodríguez
February 29	China F3 Futures; Anning, China; Clay $10,000; Singles and doubles draws	(Colombia) Cristian Rodríguez (China) Wang Chuhan; 7–6^{(7–5)}, 6–2	(China) Cui Jie (China) Te Rigele	(Germany) Sami Reinwein (Serbia) Miljan Zekić	(Chinese Taipei) Lee Kuan-yi (France) Jordan Ubiergo (United States) Alexander Centenari (Colombia) Cristian Rodríguez
February 29	Croatia F1 Futures; Rovinj, Croatia; Clay $10,000; Singles and doubles draws	(Serbia) Danilo Petrović; 7–5, 7–5	(Romania) Petru-Alexandru Luncanu	(Croatia) Matej Sabanov (Argentina) Matías Zukas	(Italy) Andrea Guerrieri (Czech Republic) Zdeněk Kolář (Germany) Sebastian Prechtel (Germany) Pascal Meis
February 29	Croatia F1 Futures; Rovinj, Croatia; Clay $10,000; Singles and doubles draws	(Serbia) Danilo Petrović (Croatia) Nino Serdarušić; 6–1, 7–5	(Italy) Omar Giacalone (Italy) Pietro Rondoni	(Croatia) Matej Sabanov (Argentina) Matías Zukas	(Italy) Andrea Guerrieri (Czech Republic) Zdeněk Kolář (Germany) Sebastian Prechtel (Germany) Pascal Meis
February 29	Egypt F7 Futures; Sharm El Sheikh, Egypt; Hard $10,000; Singles and doubles draws	(Serbia) Marko Tepavac; 3–6, 6–3, 6–4	(France) Laurent Rochette	(Italy) Antonio Massara (Czech Republic) Jaroslav Pospíšil	(India) Sriram Balaji (Italy) Matteo Fago (Czech Republic) Libor Salaba (Czech Republic) Václav Šafránek
February 29	Egypt F7 Futures; Sharm El Sheikh, Egypt; Hard $10,000; Singles and doubles draws	(Czech Republic) Dominik Kellovský (Czech Republic) Jaroslav Pospíšil; 3–6, 6–3, [13–11]	(Belgium) Sander Gillé (Belgium) Joran Vliegen	(Italy) Antonio Massara (Czech Republic) Jaroslav Pospíšil	(India) Sriram Balaji (Italy) Matteo Fago (Czech Republic) Libor Salaba (Czech Republic) Václav Šafránek
February 29	Italy F1 Futures; Trento, Italy; Carpet (indoor) $10,000; Singles and doubles draws	(France) Grégoire Jacq; 6–1, 6–4	(Germany) Dominik Böhler	(France) Hugo Grenier (France) Antoine Hoang	(France) Jonathan Kanar (Croatia) Filip Veger (Germany) Tobias Simon (France) Élie Rousset
February 29	Italy F1 Futures; Trento, Italy; Carpet (indoor) $10,000; Singles and doubles draws	(Italy) Riccardo Sinicropi (Italy) Andrea Vavassori; 6–2, 6–1	(France) Jonathan Kanar (France) Hugo Voljacques	(France) Hugo Grenier (France) Antoine Hoang	(France) Jonathan Kanar (Croatia) Filip Veger (Germany) Tobias Simon (France) Élie Rousset
February 29	Portugal F2 Futures; Faro, Portugal; Hard $10,000; Singles and doubles draws	(Netherlands) Jesse Huta Galung; 1–6, 6–4, 6–2	(Germany) Oscar Otte	(Italy) Erik Crepaldi (Spain) Pablo Vivero González	(Portugal) André Gaspar Murta (Slovakia) Patrik Fabian (Portugal) João Domingues (Slovenia) Mike Urbanija
February 29	Portugal F2 Futures; Faro, Portugal; Hard $10,000; Singles and doubles draws	(United Kingdom) Scott Clayton (United Kingdom) Jonny O'Mara; 6–2, 7–5	(Italy) Erik Crepaldi (Portugal) André Gaspar Murta	(Italy) Erik Crepaldi (Spain) Pablo Vivero González	(Portugal) André Gaspar Murta (Slovakia) Patrik Fabian (Portugal) João Domingues (Slovenia) Mike Urbanija
February 29	Spain F6 Futures; Tarragona, Spain; Clay $10,000; Singles and doubles draws	(Canada) Steven Diez; 5–7, 6–1, 6–0	(Spain) Gerard Granollers	(Spain) Pedro Martínez (Japan) Akira Santillan	(Spain) Carlos Taberner (Spain) Ricardo Ojeda Lara (Spain) Jaume Munar (Spain) Bernabé Zapata Miralles
February 29	Spain F6 Futures; Tarragona, Spain; Clay $10,000; Singles and doubles draws	(Spain) Marc López (Spain) Jaume Munar; 6–7^{(4–7)}, 6–3, [10–7]	(Portugal) Gonçalo Oliveira (Japan) Akira Santillan	(Spain) Pedro Martínez (Japan) Akira Santillan	(Spain) Carlos Taberner (Spain) Ricardo Ojeda Lara (Spain) Jaume Munar (Spain) Bernabé Zapata Miralles
February 29	Tunisia F8 Futures; Hammamet, Tunisia; Clay $10,000; Singles and doubles draws	(Spain) Pol Toledo Bagué; 6–4, 6–2	(Argentina) Mariano Kestelboim	(Morocco) Amine Ahouda (Brazil) Bruno Sant'Anna	(Russia) Ivan Nedelko (France) Baptiste Crepatte (Italy) Antonio Campo (Italy) Alberto Cammarata
February 29	Tunisia F8 Futures; Hammamet, Tunisia; Clay $10,000; Singles and doubles draws	(Italy) Antonio Campo (Italy) Walter Trusendi; 7–5, 6–2	(Morocco) Amine Ahouda (Morocco) Yassine Idmbarek	(Morocco) Amine Ahouda (Brazil) Bruno Sant'Anna	(Russia) Ivan Nedelko (France) Baptiste Crepatte (Italy) Antonio Campo (Italy) Alberto Cammarata
February 29	Turkey F9 Futures; Antalya, Turkey; Hard $10,000; Singles and doubles draws	(France) Yannick Jankovits; 7–6^{(11–9)}, 4–6, 6–3	(India) Prajnesh Gunneswaran	(Austria) Gibril Diarra (Belgium) Michael Geerts	(Netherlands) Scott Griekspoor (Netherlands) Tallon Griekspoor (Czech Republic) Marek Michalička (United States) Nick Chappell
February 29	Turkey F9 Futures; Antalya, Turkey; Hard $10,000; Singles and doubles draws	(United States) John Lamble (Netherlands) Paul Monteban; 6–4, 6–3	(Turkey) Sarp Ağabigün (Turkey) Muhammet Haylaz	(Austria) Gibril Diarra (Belgium) Michael Geerts	(Netherlands) Scott Griekspoor (Netherlands) Tallon Griekspoor (Czech Republic) Marek Michalička (United States) Nick Chappell
February 29	United States F9 Futures; Boca Raton, USA; Clay $10,000; Singles and doubles draws	(Argentina) Patricio Heras; 6–4, 6–1	(Sweden) Christian Lindell	(United States) Wil Spencer (France) Jonathan Eysseric	(Argentina) Facundo Mena (Serbia) Miomir Kecmanović (United States) Sekou Bangoura (Colombia) Juan Sebastián Gómez
February 29	United States F9 Futures; Boca Raton, USA; Clay $10,000; Singles and doubles draws	(Colombia) Alejandro Gómez (Ecuador) Roberto Quiroz; 6–3, 7–6^{(7–2)}	(Colombia) José Daniel Bendeck (Colombia) Nicolás Mejía	(United States) Wil Spencer (France) Jonathan Eysseric	(Argentina) Facundo Mena (Serbia) Miomir Kecmanović (United States) Sekou Bangoura (Colombia) Juan Sebastián Gómez

=== March ===
Week of	Tournament	Winner	Runners-up	Semifinalists	Quarterfinalists
March 7	Canada F2 Futures; Sherbrooke, Canada; Hard (indoor) $25,000; Singles and doubles draws	(United States) Stefan Kozlov; 4–6, 6–4, 6–4	(United Kingdom) Lloyd Glasspool	(Canada) Félix Auger-Aliassime (Canada) Filip Peliwo	(United States) Mico Santiago (United States) Eric Quigley (United Kingdom) Edward Corrie (France) Hugo Nys
March 7	Canada F2 Futures; Sherbrooke, Canada; Hard (indoor) $25,000; Singles and doubles draws	(South Africa) Keith-Patrick Crowley (United States) Max Schnur; 3–6, 7–6^{(7–3)}, [10–6]	(United Kingdom) Luke Bambridge (United Kingdom) Liam Broady	(Canada) Félix Auger-Aliassime (Canada) Filip Peliwo	(United States) Mico Santiago (United States) Eric Quigley (United Kingdom) Edward Corrie (France) Hugo Nys
March 7	Argentina F2 Futures; Mendoza, Argentina; Clay $10,000; Singles and doubles draws	(Argentina) Hernán Casanova; 6–2, 6–1	(Argentina) Juan Ignacio Galarza	(Argentina) Juan Pablo Paz (Italy) Francisco Bahamonde	(Bolivia) Hugo Dellien (Brazil) Oscar José Gutierrez (Argentina) Andrea Collarini (Argentina) Eduardo Agustín Torre
March 7	Argentina F2 Futures; Mendoza, Argentina; Clay $10,000; Singles and doubles draws	(Argentina) Juan Ignacio Galarza (Argentina) Mateo Nicolás Martínez; 6–4, 7–5	(Argentina) Hernán Casanova (Argentina) Eduardo Agustín Torre	(Argentina) Juan Pablo Paz (Italy) Francisco Bahamonde	(Bolivia) Hugo Dellien (Brazil) Oscar José Gutierrez (Argentina) Andrea Collarini (Argentina) Eduardo Agustín Torre
March 7	Azerbaijan F4 Futures; Baku, Azerbaijan; Carpet (indoor) $10,000; Singles and doubles draws	(Russia) Evgenii Tiurnev; 7–6^{(7–4)}, 6–1	(Slovakia) Peter Vajda	(Czech Republic) Michal Konečný (Ukraine) Marat Deviatiarov	(Czech Republic) Marek Jaloviec (Russia) Vitaly Kozyukov (Russia) Evgeny Elistratov (Republic of Ireland) Sam Barry
March 7	Azerbaijan F4 Futures; Baku, Azerbaijan; Carpet (indoor) $10,000; Singles and doubles draws	(Russia) Alexander Igoshin (Russia) Yan Sabanin; 7–6^{(7–4)}, 7–6^{(7–4)}	(Russia) Anton Galkin (Russia) Ilya Lebedev	(Czech Republic) Michal Konečný (Ukraine) Marat Deviatiarov	(Czech Republic) Marek Jaloviec (Russia) Vitaly Kozyukov (Russia) Evgeny Elistratov (Republic of Ireland) Sam Barry
March 7	Croatia F2 Futures; Poreč, Croatia; Clay $10,000; Singles and doubles draws	(Czech Republic) Zdeněk Kolář; 4–6, 6–4, 6–2	(Germany) Yannick Maden	(Italy) Omar Giacalone (Romania) Vasile Antonescu	(Romania) Bogdan Borza (Serbia) Ivan Bjelica (Russia) Victor Baluda (Spain) Jaume Munar
March 7	Croatia F2 Futures; Poreč, Croatia; Clay $10,000; Singles and doubles draws	(Italy) Omar Giacalone (Italy) Pietro Rondoni; 6–2, 6–2	(Serbia) Ivan Bjelica (Croatia) Tomislav Draganja	(Italy) Omar Giacalone (Romania) Vasile Antonescu	(Romania) Bogdan Borza (Serbia) Ivan Bjelica (Russia) Victor Baluda (Spain) Jaume Munar
March 7	Egypt F8 Futures; Sharm El Sheikh, Egypt; Hard $10,000; Singles and doubles draws	(Serbia) Marko Tepavac; 7–6^{(7–3)}, 6–1	(France) Alexandre Müller	(France) Lauren Rochette (Ukraine) Vladyslav Manafov	(India) Sriram Balaji (France) Romain Bauvy (Czech Republic) Dominik Kellovský (Germany) Matthias Wunner
March 7	Egypt F8 Futures; Sharm El Sheikh, Egypt; Hard $10,000; Singles and doubles draws	(Belgium) Sander Gillé (Belgium) Joran Vliegen; 6–3, 7–6^{(7–2)}	(Germany) Tom Schönenberg (Germany) Matthias Wunner	(France) Lauren Rochette (Ukraine) Vladyslav Manafov	(India) Sriram Balaji (France) Romain Bauvy (Czech Republic) Dominik Kellovský (Germany) Matthias Wunner
March 7	France F5 Futures; Balma, France; Hard (indoor) $10,000; Singles and doubles draws	(United States) Raymond Sarmiento; 6–4, 6–4	(France) Corentin Moutet	(France) Fabien Reboul (France) Benjamin Bonzi	(France) Maxime Teixeira (France) Alexis Gautier (Norway) Viktor Durasovic (Belgium) Julien Cagnina
March 7	France F5 Futures; Balma, France; Hard (indoor) $10,000; Singles and doubles draws	(France) Benjamin Bonzi (France) Fabien Reboul; 7–5, 6–3	(Canada) Martin Beran (France) Maxime Tabatruong	(France) Fabien Reboul (France) Benjamin Bonzi	(France) Maxime Teixeira (France) Alexis Gautier (Norway) Viktor Durasovic (Belgium) Julien Cagnina
March 7	Israel F4 Futures; Herzliya, Israel; Hard $10,000; Singles and doubles draws	(France) Yannick Jankovits; 7–6^{(7–4)}, 6–1	(Germany) Jonas Lütjen	(Portugal) Romain Barbosa (United States) Peter Kobelt	(Italy) Roberto Marcora (Italy) Matteo Viola (Israel) Edan Leshem (Israel) Ram Kapach
March 7	Israel F4 Futures; Herzliya, Israel; Hard $10,000; Singles and doubles draws	(United States) Nick Chappell (United States) Hunter Reese; 6–4, 6–2	(Portugal) Romain Barbosa (France) Yannick Jankovits	(Portugal) Romain Barbosa (United States) Peter Kobelt	(Italy) Roberto Marcora (Italy) Matteo Viola (Israel) Edan Leshem (Israel) Ram Kapach
March 7	Italy F2 Futures; Basiglio, Italy; Hard (indoor) $10,000; Singles and doubles draws	(Netherlands) Antal van der Duim; 7–6^{(7–2)}, 6–2	(France) Hugo Grenier	(Czech Republic) Jan Hernych (Italy) Alessandro Bega	(France) Grégoire Jacq (Italy) Francesco Vilardo (Germany) Tobias Simon (Italy) Adelchi Virgili
March 7	Italy F2 Futures; Basiglio, Italy; Hard (indoor) $10,000; Singles and doubles draws	(Netherlands) David Pel (Netherlands) Antal van der Duim; 6–4, 6–4	(France) Antoine Hoang (France) Grégoire Jacq	(Czech Republic) Jan Hernych (Italy) Alessandro Bega	(France) Grégoire Jacq (Italy) Francesco Vilardo (Germany) Tobias Simon (Italy) Adelchi Virgili
March 7	Japan F1 Futures; Nishitama, Japan; Hard $10,000; Singles and doubles draws	(Chinese Taipei) Huang Liang-chi; 7–5, 7–5	(Japan) Gengo Kikuchi	(Japan) Shuichi Sekiguchi (Japan) Issei Okamura	(Japan) Takuto Niki (Japan) Yuya Kibi (India) Karunuday Singh (Japan) Takashi Saito
March 7	Japan F1 Futures; Nishitama, Japan; Hard $10,000; Singles and doubles draws	(Japan) Yuya Kibi (Japan) Toshihide Matsui; 6–3, 6–1	(Chinese Taipei) Huang Liang-chi (New Zealand) Ben McLachlan	(Japan) Shuichi Sekiguchi (Japan) Issei Okamura	(Japan) Takuto Niki (Japan) Yuya Kibi (India) Karunuday Singh (Japan) Takashi Saito
March 7	Morocco F1 Futures; Agadir, Morocco; Clay $10,000; Singles and doubles draws	(Germany) Jeremy Jahn; 6–1, 3–6, 6–2	(Spain) Mario Vilella Martínez	(Morocco) Lamine Ouahab (Italy) Filippo Leonardi	(Spain) Marc Fornell (France) Samuel Bensoussan (Spain) Marcos Giraldi Requena (France) Maxime Hamou
March 7	Morocco F1 Futures; Agadir, Morocco; Clay $10,000; Singles and doubles draws	(Spain) Marc Fornell (Morocco) Lamine Ouahab; 6–7^{(4–7)}, 6–4, [13–11]	(Spain) Marcos Giraldi Requena (Switzerland) Jacob Kahoun	(Morocco) Lamine Ouahab (Italy) Filippo Leonardi	(Spain) Marc Fornell (France) Samuel Bensoussan (Spain) Marcos Giraldi Requena (France) Maxime Hamou
March 7	Portugal F3 Futures; Loulé, Portugal; Hard $10,000; Singles and doubles draws	(Portugal) Frederico Ferreira Silva; 1–6, 6–3, 6–1	(Portugal) Rui Machado	(United Kingdom) Scott Clayton (Spain) Carlos Boluda-Purkiss	(Portugal) João Domingues (Spain) Andrés Artuñedo (Slovakia) Patrik Fabian (Portugal) André Gaspar Murta
March 7	Portugal F3 Futures; Loulé, Portugal; Hard $10,000; Singles and doubles draws	(Germany) Andreas Mies (Germany) Oscar Otte; 5–0, retired	(Portugal) Nuno Deus (Portugal) João Domingues	(United Kingdom) Scott Clayton (Spain) Carlos Boluda-Purkiss	(Portugal) João Domingues (Spain) Andrés Artuñedo (Slovakia) Patrik Fabian (Portugal) André Gaspar Murta
March 7	Tunisia F9 Futures; Hammamet, Tunisia; Clay $10,000; Singles and doubles draws	(Portugal) Pedro Sousa; 6–4, 6–2	(Spain) Alberto Romero de Ávila Senise	(Russia) Ivan Nedelko (Germany) Marc Sieber	(Austria) Lenny Hampel (Spain) Álvaro López San Martín (Russia) Alexander Zhurbin (Spain) Pol Toledo Bagué
March 7	Tunisia F9 Futures; Hammamet, Tunisia; Clay $10,000; Singles and doubles draws	(Czech Republic) Filip Brtnický (Ukraine) Filipp Kekercheni; 7–6^{(8–6)}, 7–6^{(7–4)}	(Spain) Alberto Romero de Ávila Senise (Spain) Miguel Semmler	(Russia) Ivan Nedelko (Germany) Marc Sieber	(Austria) Lenny Hampel (Spain) Álvaro López San Martín (Russia) Alexander Zhurbin (Spain) Pol Toledo Bagué
March 7	Turkey F10 Futures; Antalya, Turkey; Clay $10,000; Singles and doubles draws	(United Kingdom) Alexander Ward; 6–3, 6–3	(Germany) Demian Raab	(Bosnia and Herzegovina) Nerman Fatić (Italy) Claudio Fortuna	(Italy) Riccardo Sinicropi (Spain) Paco Climent Gregori (United States) John Lamble (Germany) Peter Heller
March 7	Turkey F10 Futures; Antalya, Turkey; Clay $10,000; Singles and doubles draws	(Bosnia and Herzegovina) Nerman Fatić (Croatia) Franjo Raspudić; 6–7^{(4–7)}, 6–4, [10–8]	(Ukraine) Oleksandr Bielinskyi (France) Ronan Joncour	(Bosnia and Herzegovina) Nerman Fatić (Italy) Claudio Fortuna	(Italy) Riccardo Sinicropi (Spain) Paco Climent Gregori (United States) John Lamble (Germany) Peter Heller
March 14	Australia F3 Futures; Mornington, Australia; Clay $25,000; Singles and doubles draws	(Australia) Andrew Whittington; 6–2, 6–3	(Australia) Gavin van Peperzeel	(Australia) Marc Polmans (Australia) Christopher O'Connell	(Australia) Bradley Mousley (Australia) Maverick Banes (New Zealand) Jose Rubin Statham (Australia) Aaron Addison
March 14	Australia F3 Futures; Mornington, Australia; Clay $25,000; Singles and doubles draws	(Australia) Greg Jones (Australia) Andrew Whittington; 6–3, 6–2	(Australia) Bradley Mousley (Australia) Gavin van Peperzeel	(Australia) Marc Polmans (Australia) Christopher O'Connell	(Australia) Bradley Mousley (Australia) Maverick Banes (New Zealand) Jose Rubin Statham (Australia) Aaron Addison
March 14	France F6 Futures; Poitiers, France; Hard (indoor) $25,000; Singles and doubles draws	(Germany) Andreas Beck; 7–6^{(10–8)}, 6–4	(Belgium) Maxime Authom	(France) Constant Lestienne (United States) Raymond Sarmiento	(Switzerland) Adrien Bossel (France) Sadio Doumbia (Netherlands) Scott Griekspoor (France) Maxime Teixeira
March 14	France F6 Futures; Poitiers, France; Hard (indoor) $25,000; Singles and doubles draws	(Belgium) Maxime Authom (France) Jonathan Eysseric; 4–6, 6–4, [11–9]	(Netherlands) Scott Griekspoor (Netherlands) Tallon Griekspoor	(France) Constant Lestienne (United States) Raymond Sarmiento	(Switzerland) Adrien Bossel (France) Sadio Doumbia (Netherlands) Scott Griekspoor (France) Maxime Teixeira
March 14	United States F10 Futures; Bakersfield, USA; Hard $25,000; Singles and doubles draws	(United States) Michael Mmoh; 6–4, 6–7^{(5–7)}, 6–1	(Norway) Casper Ruud	(Germany) Sebastian Fanselow (United States) Dennis Nevolo	(India) Somdev Devvarman (Germany) Jan Choinski (United States) Nicolas Meister (United States) Mico Santiago
March 14	United States F10 Futures; Bakersfield, USA; Hard $25,000; Singles and doubles draws	(United States) Nicolas Meister (France) Adrien Puget; 7–5, 6–3	(United States) Sekou Bangoura (Philippines) Ruben Gonzales	(Germany) Sebastian Fanselow (United States) Dennis Nevolo	(India) Somdev Devvarman (Germany) Jan Choinski (United States) Nicolas Meister (United States) Mico Santiago
March 14	Argentina F3 Futures; Rosario, Argentina; Clay $10,000; Singles and doubles draws	(Argentina) Tomás Lipovšek Puches; 6–4, 2–6, 6–1	(Brazil) Pedro Sakamoto	(Brazil) Nicolas Santos (Austria) Michael Linzer	(Argentina) Juan Pablo Ficovich (Argentina) Juan Pablo Paz (Argentina) Hernán Casanova (Argentina) Andrea Collarini
March 14	Argentina F3 Futures; Rosario, Argentina; Clay $10,000; Singles and doubles draws	(Brazil) Igor Marcondes (Brazil) Rafael Matos; 3–6, 7–6^{(7–3)}, [10–4]	(Brazil) Daniel Dutra da Silva (Brazil) Ricardo Hocevar	(Brazil) Nicolas Santos (Austria) Michael Linzer	(Argentina) Juan Pablo Ficovich (Argentina) Juan Pablo Paz (Argentina) Hernán Casanova (Argentina) Andrea Collarini
March 14	Azerbaijan F5 Futures; Baku, Azerbaijan; Carpet (indoor) $10,000; Singles and doubles draws	(Czech Republic) Michal Konečný; 6–4, 6–2	(Ukraine) Vadym Ursu	(Ukraine) Danylo Kalenichenko (Russia) Evgeny Elistratov	(Russia) Anton Galkin (Czech Republic) David Poljak (Russia) Vitaly Kozyukov (Germany) Daniel Altmaier
March 14	Azerbaijan F5 Futures; Baku, Azerbaijan; Carpet (indoor) $10,000; Singles and doubles draws	(Ukraine) Marat Deviatiarov (Ukraine) Danylo Kalenichenko; 6–4, 6–4	(Russia) Alexander Igoshin (Russia) Yan Sabanin	(Ukraine) Danylo Kalenichenko (Russia) Evgeny Elistratov	(Russia) Anton Galkin (Czech Republic) David Poljak (Russia) Vitaly Kozyukov (Germany) Daniel Altmaier
March 14	Croatia F3 Futures; Pula, Croatia; Clay $10,000; Singles and doubles draws	(Spain) Pedro Martínez; 6–3, 6–1	(Czech Republic) Zdeněk Kolář	(Spain) Jaume Munar (Croatia) Antonio Šančić	(Italy) Pietro Licciardi (Montenegro) Ljubomir Čelebić (Italy) Marco Bortolotti (Croatia) Nino Serdarušić
March 14	Croatia F3 Futures; Pula, Croatia; Clay $10,000; Singles and doubles draws	(Poland) Paweł Ciaś (Poland) Grzegorz Panfil; 4–6, 6–3, [10–6]	(Spain) Pedro Martínez (Spain) Jaume Munar	(Spain) Jaume Munar (Croatia) Antonio Šančić	(Italy) Pietro Licciardi (Montenegro) Ljubomir Čelebić (Italy) Marco Bortolotti (Croatia) Nino Serdarušić
March 14	Egypt F9 Futures; Sharm El Sheikh, Egypt; Hard $10,000; Singles and doubles draws	(France) Laurent Rochette; 6–4, 6–3	(United States) Clay Thompson	(Ukraine) Vladyslav Manafov (Egypt) Karim-Mohamed Maamoun	(Brazil) Tiago Lopes (United Kingdom) Neil Pauffley (Austria) Sebastian Ofner (Poland) Michał Dembek
March 14	Egypt F9 Futures; Sharm El Sheikh, Egypt; Hard $10,000; Singles and doubles draws	(Portugal) Frederico Ferreira Silva (Spain) Pablo Vivero González; 3–6, 6–1, [10–6]	(Belgium) Michael Geerts (Belgium) Jonas Merckx	(Ukraine) Vladyslav Manafov (Egypt) Karim-Mohamed Maamoun	(Brazil) Tiago Lopes (United Kingdom) Neil Pauffley (Austria) Sebastian Ofner (Poland) Michał Dembek
March 14	Israel F5 Futures; Ramat HaSharon, Israel; Hard $10,000; Singles and doubles draws	(Portugal) Romain Barbosa; 6–2, 6–3	(United Kingdom) James Marsalek	(Hungary) Gábor Borsos (Switzerland) Antoine Bellier	(United States) Nick Chappell (Belgium) Julien Dubail (Germany) Jonas Lütjen (United Kingdom) Richard Gabb
March 14	Israel F5 Futures; Ramat HaSharon, Israel; Hard $10,000; Singles and doubles draws	(France) Corentin Denolly (France) Maxime Janvier; 4–6, 6–4, [12–10]	(Switzerland) Antoine Bellier (Hungary) Gábor Borsos	(Hungary) Gábor Borsos (Switzerland) Antoine Bellier	(United States) Nick Chappell (Belgium) Julien Dubail (Germany) Jonas Lütjen (United Kingdom) Richard Gabb
March 14	Italy F3 Futures; Sondrio, Italy; Hard (indoor) $10,000; Singles and doubles draws	(Sweden) Markus Eriksson; 6–3, 6–1	(Poland) Marcin Gawron	(France) Mick Lescure (Italy) Alessandro Bega	(Italy) Gianluca Di Nicola (France) Hugo Voljacques (France) Grégoire Jacq (Germany) Johannes Härteis
March 14	Italy F3 Futures; Sondrio, Italy; Hard (indoor) $10,000; Singles and doubles draws	(Sweden) Markus Eriksson (Brazil) Wilson Leite; 6–4, 7–6^{(7–5)}	(France) Antoine Hoang (France) Grégoire Jacq	(France) Mick Lescure (Italy) Alessandro Bega	(Italy) Gianluca Di Nicola (France) Hugo Voljacques (France) Grégoire Jacq (Germany) Johannes Härteis
March 14	Japan F2 Futures; Nishitōkyō, Japan; Hard $10,000; Singles and doubles draws	(South Korea) Kwon Soon-woo; 6–3, 6–4	(Japan) Yuya Kibi	(South Korea) Chung Yun-seong (Japan) Masaya Kobayashi	(Japan) Gengo Kikuchi (Japan) Shintaro Imai (Japan) Shuichi Sekiguchi (India) Sidharth Rawat
March 14	Japan F2 Futures; Nishitōkyō, Japan; Hard $10,000; Singles and doubles draws	(South Korea) Chung Yun-seong (South Korea) Kwon Soon-woo; 2–6, 6–2, [10–3]	(Japan) Issei Okamura (Japan) Kento Takeuchi	(South Korea) Chung Yun-seong (Japan) Masaya Kobayashi	(Japan) Gengo Kikuchi (Japan) Shintaro Imai (Japan) Shuichi Sekiguchi (India) Sidharth Rawat
March 14	Morocco F2 Futures; Beni Mellal, Morocco; Clay $10,000; Singles and doubles draws	(Morocco) Lamine Ouahab; 6–2, 4–6, 6–2	(Canada) Steven Diez	(France) Maxime Hamou (Belgium) Clément Geens	(Spain) Marcos Giraldi Requena (Chile) Bastián Malla (Netherlands) Lennert van der Linden (Spain) Mario Vilella Martínez
March 14	Morocco F2 Futures; Beni Mellal, Morocco; Clay $10,000; Singles and doubles draws	(Spain) Marc Fornell (Morocco) Lamine Ouahab; 6–3, 7–5	(Italy) Filippo Leonardi (Italy) Fabio Mercuri	(France) Maxime Hamou (Belgium) Clément Geens	(Spain) Marcos Giraldi Requena (Chile) Bastián Malla (Netherlands) Lennert van der Linden (Spain) Mario Vilella Martínez
March 14	Tunisia F10 Futures; Hammamet, Tunisia; Clay $10,000; Singles and doubles draws	(Belgium) Arthur De Greef; 1–6, 6–1, 6–2	(Portugal) Pedro Sousa	(Spain) Carlos Taberner (Belgium) Joris De Loore	(France) Baptiste Crepatte (Spain) Alberto Romero de Ávila Senise (Austria) Lenny Hampel (Germany) Marc Sieber
March 14	Tunisia F10 Futures; Hammamet, Tunisia; Clay $10,000; Singles and doubles draws	(Austria) Lenny Hampel (Russia) Roman Safiullin; 6–1, 6–3	(Russia) Ivan Nedelko (Finland) Henrik Sillanpää	(Spain) Carlos Taberner (Belgium) Joris De Loore	(France) Baptiste Crepatte (Spain) Alberto Romero de Ávila Senise (Austria) Lenny Hampel (Germany) Marc Sieber
March 14	Turkey F11 Futures; Antalya, Turkey; Clay $10,000; Singles and doubles draws	(Russia) Kirill Dmitriev; 6–2, 6–2	(Austria) Dominic Weidinger	(Italy) Claudio Fortuna (Germany) Nico Matic	(Germany) Demian Raab (Italy) Riccardo Bonadio (France) Ronan Joncour (United Kingdom) Alexander Ward
March 14	Turkey F11 Futures; Antalya, Turkey; Clay $10,000; Singles and doubles draws	(Bulgaria) Alexandar Lazov (Czech Republic) Michal Schmid; 6–4, 6–1	(France) Jérôme Inzerillo (France) François-Arthur Vibert	(Italy) Claudio Fortuna (Germany) Nico Matic	(Germany) Demian Raab (Italy) Riccardo Bonadio (France) Ronan Joncour (United Kingdom) Alexander Ward
March 21	Australia F4 Futures; Mornington, Australia; Clay $25,000; Singles and doubles draws	(Australia) Andrew Whittington; 7–5, 6–3	(Australia) Christopher O'Connell	(New Zealand) Jose Rubin Statham (Australia) Dayne Kelly	(Australia) Daniel Nolan (Australia) Bradley Mousley (Australia) Marc Polmans (Australia) Greg Jones
March 21	Australia F4 Futures; Mornington, Australia; Clay $25,000; Singles and doubles draws	(Australia) Steven de Waard (Australia) Marc Polmans; 6–2, 6–3	(Australia) Bradley Mousley (Australia) Gavin van Peperzeel	(New Zealand) Jose Rubin Statham (Australia) Dayne Kelly	(Australia) Daniel Nolan (Australia) Bradley Mousley (Australia) Marc Polmans (Australia) Greg Jones
March 21	United States F11 Futures; Calabasas, USA; Hard $25,000; Singles and doubles draws	(Australia) Matthew Barton; 7–6^{(8–6)}, 6–3	(Switzerland) Henri Laaksonen	(United States) Eric Quigley (United States) Mitchell Krueger	(United States) Ernesto Escobedo (Brazil) Marcelo Zormann (United Kingdom) Liam Broady (Czech Republic) Marek Michalička
March 21	United States F11 Futures; Calabasas, USA; Hard $25,000; Singles and doubles draws	(United States) Nicolas Meister (United States) Eric Quigley; 4–6, 6–2, [10–3]	(Switzerland) Henri Laaksonen (Czech Republic) Marek Michalička	(United States) Eric Quigley (United States) Mitchell Krueger	(United States) Ernesto Escobedo (Brazil) Marcelo Zormann (United Kingdom) Liam Broady (Czech Republic) Marek Michalička
March 21	Argentina F4 Futures; Olavarría, Argentina; Clay $10,000; Singles and doubles draws	(Argentina) Maximiliano Estévez; 6–2, 7–6^{(7–4)}	(Argentina) Tomás Lipovšek Puches	(Argentina) Juan Ignacio Galarza (Brazil) Daniel Dutra da Silva	(Brazil) Ricardo Hocevar (Argentina) Hernán Casanova (Argentina) Federico Coria (Austria) Michael Linzer
March 21	Argentina F4 Futures; Olavarría, Argentina; Clay $10,000; Singles and doubles draws	(Argentina) Franco Agamenone (Argentina) Juan Pablo Paz; 2–6, 6–3, [10–7]	(Brazil) Oscar José Guiterrez (Argentina) Gabriel Alejandro Hidalgo	(Argentina) Juan Ignacio Galarza (Brazil) Daniel Dutra da Silva	(Brazil) Ricardo Hocevar (Argentina) Hernán Casanova (Argentina) Federico Coria (Austria) Michael Linzer
March 21	Azerbaijan F6 Futures; Baku, Azerbaijan; Carpet (indoor) $10,000; Singles and doubles draws	(Czech Republic) Marek Jaloviec; 6–3, 6–4	(Russia) Evgeny Elistratov	(Russia) Vitaly Kozyukov (Russia) Alexander Igoshin	(Germany) Daniel Altmaier (Czech Republic) David Poljak (Ukraine) Danylo Kalenichenko (Russia) Ilya Lebedev
March 21	Azerbaijan F6 Futures; Baku, Azerbaijan; Carpet (indoor) $10,000; Singles and doubles draws	(Russia) Alexander Igoshin (Russia) Yan Sabanin; 6–4, 6–4	(Russia) Evgeny Elistratov (Russia) Vitaly Kozyukov	(Russia) Vitaly Kozyukov (Russia) Alexander Igoshin	(Germany) Daniel Altmaier (Czech Republic) David Poljak (Ukraine) Danylo Kalenichenko (Russia) Ilya Lebedev
March 21	Croatia F4 Futures; Opatija, Croatia; Clay $10,000; Singles and doubles draws	(Romania) Dragoș Dima; 6–1, 6–1	(Croatia) Nino Serdarušić	(Spain) Pedro Martínez (Croatia) Kristijan Mesaroš	(Italy) Pietro Licciardi (Croatia) Matej Sabanov (Romania) Vasile Antonescu (Poland) Kamil Majchrzak
March 21	Croatia F4 Futures; Opatija, Croatia; Clay $10,000; Singles and doubles draws	(Croatia) Tomislav Draganja (Croatia) Nino Serdarušić; 6–4, 7–6^{(12–10)}	(Croatia) Ivan Sabanov (Croatia) Matej Sabanov	(Spain) Pedro Martínez (Croatia) Kristijan Mesaroš	(Italy) Pietro Licciardi (Croatia) Matej Sabanov (Romania) Vasile Antonescu (Poland) Kamil Majchrzak
March 21	Egypt F10 Futures; Sharm El Sheikh, Egypt; Hard $10,000; Singles and doubles draws	(Egypt) Karim-Mohamed Maamoun; 6–4, 4–6, 7–5	(France) Gleb Sakharov	(Portugal) Frederico Ferreira Silva (Venezuela) Ricardo Rodríguez	(Spain) José Francisco Vidal Azorín (Italy) Andrea Vavassori (Italy) Francesco Vilardo (Belgium) Jonas Merckx
March 21	Egypt F10 Futures; Sharm El Sheikh, Egypt; Hard $10,000; Singles and doubles draws	(Czech Republic) Tomáš Papík (Czech Republic) Matěj Vocel; 3–6, 6–4, [10–4]	(Germany) Tom Schönenburg (Portugal) Frederico Ferreira Silva	(Portugal) Frederico Ferreira Silva (Venezuela) Ricardo Rodríguez	(Spain) José Francisco Vidal Azorín (Italy) Andrea Vavassori (Italy) Francesco Vilardo (Belgium) Jonas Merckx
March 21	France F7 Futures; Villers-lès-Nancy, France; Hard (indoor) $10,000; Singles and doubles draws	(France) Alexandre Sidorenko; 7–5, 6–4	(France) Tak Khunn Wang	(Germany) Oscar Otte (France) Geoffrey Blancaneaux	(France) Quentin Halys (United Kingdom) Evan Hoyt (France) Mick Lescure (Portugal) Gonçalo Oliveira
March 21	France F7 Futures; Villers-lès-Nancy, France; Hard (indoor) $10,000; Singles and doubles draws	(Germany) Andreas Mies (Germany) Oscar Otte; 4–6, 6–4, [10–7]	(Canada) Martin Beran (United Kingdom) Evan Hoyt	(Germany) Oscar Otte (France) Geoffrey Blancaneaux	(France) Quentin Halys (United Kingdom) Evan Hoyt (France) Mick Lescure (Portugal) Gonçalo Oliveira
March 21	Greece F1 Futures; Heraklion, Greece; Hard $10,000; Singles and doubles draws	(Czech Republic) Dominik Kellovský; 7–6^{(7–2)}, 6–4	(Guatemala) Christopher Díaz Figueroa	(Sweden) Markus Eriksson (Czech Republic) Petr Michnev	(Serbia) Miki Janković (Germany) Sami Reinwein (Italy) Erik Crepaldi (Belarus) Maxim Dubarenco
March 21	Greece F1 Futures; Heraklion, Greece; Hard $10,000; Singles and doubles draws	(Sweden) Isak Arvidsson (Sweden) Fred Simonsson; 6–1, 7–6^{(7–3)}	(Belarus) Maxim Dubarenco (Sweden) Markus Eriksson	(Sweden) Markus Eriksson (Czech Republic) Petr Michnev	(Serbia) Miki Janković (Germany) Sami Reinwein (Italy) Erik Crepaldi (Belarus) Maxim Dubarenco
March 21	Israel F6 Futures; Ramat HaSharon, Israel; Hard $10,000; Singles and doubles draws	(United States) Peter Kobelt; 6–3, 6–4	(Georgia (country)) Aleksandre Metreveli	(Israel) Amir Weintraub (France) Maxime Janvier	(Denmark) Frederik Nielsen (France) Alexis Musialek (Austria) Lucas Miedler (Israel) Daniel Cukierman
March 21	Israel F6 Futures; Ramat HaSharon, Israel; Hard $10,000; Singles and doubles draws	(Austria) Lucas Miedler (Italy) Gianluigi Quinzi; 6–1, 4–6, [10–5]	(Georgia (country)) Aleksandre Metreveli (Ukraine) Volodymyr Uzhylovskyi	(Israel) Amir Weintraub (France) Maxime Janvier	(Denmark) Frederik Nielsen (France) Alexis Musialek (Austria) Lucas Miedler (Israel) Daniel Cukierman
March 21	Japan F3 Futures; Kōfu, Japan; Hard $10,000; Singles and doubles draws	(South Korea) Lee Duck-hee; 6–2, 6–3	(Japan) Yuya Kibi	(Japan) Shuichi Sekiguchi (China) Gao Xin	(South Korea) Kwon Soon-woo (South Korea) Kim Young-seok (Japan) Makoto Ochi (Japan) Shintaro Imai
March 21	Japan F3 Futures; Kōfu, Japan; Hard $10,000; Singles and doubles draws	(Japan) Shintaro Imai (Japan) Takuto Niki; 6–1, 6–2	(Japan) Yuya Kibi (Japan) Toshihide Matsui	(Japan) Shuichi Sekiguchi (China) Gao Xin	(South Korea) Kwon Soon-woo (South Korea) Kim Young-seok (Japan) Makoto Ochi (Japan) Shintaro Imai
March 21	Morocco F3 Futures; Khouribga, Morocco; Clay $10,000; Singles and doubles draws	(Morocco) Lamine Ouahab; 6–3, 6–3	(France) Maxime Hamou	(Canada) Steven Diez (Chile) Cristian Garín	(Germany) Julian Onken (Spain) Marcos Giraldi Requena (Belgium) Clément Geens (Netherlands) Lennert van der Linden
March 21	Morocco F3 Futures; Khouribga, Morocco; Clay $10,000; Singles and doubles draws	(Spain) Marcos Giraldi Requena (Switzerland) Jacob Kahoun; 6–3, 4–6, [10–4]	(Belgium) Clément Geens (Belgium) Omar Salman	(Canada) Steven Diez (Chile) Cristian Garín	(Germany) Julian Onken (Spain) Marcos Giraldi Requena (Belgium) Clément Geens (Netherlands) Lennert van der Linden
March 21	Tunisia F11 Futures; Hammamet, Tunisia; Clay $10,000; Singles and doubles draws	(Portugal) Pedro Sousa; 1–6, 6–1, 7–5	(Belgium) Joris De Loore	(Spain) Eduard Esteve Lobato (Russia) Roman Safiullin	(Austria) Lenny Hampel (Spain) Marc Giner (Monaco) Benjamin Balleret (Czech Republic) Filip Brtnický
March 21	Tunisia F11 Futures; Hammamet, Tunisia; Clay $10,000; Singles and doubles draws	(Spain) Eduard Esteve Lobato (Spain) David Vega Hernández; 5–7, 7–5, [10–3]	(Russia) Aleksandr Malyshev (Russia) Maksim Malyshev	(Spain) Eduard Esteve Lobato (Russia) Roman Safiullin	(Austria) Lenny Hampel (Spain) Marc Giner (Monaco) Benjamin Balleret (Czech Republic) Filip Brtnický
March 21	Turkey F12 Futures; Antalya, Turkey; Hard $10,000; Singles and doubles draws	(Slovakia) Filip Horanský; 6–1, 6–1	(Switzerland) Yann Marti	(Russia) Kirill Dmitriev (Netherlands) Jesse Huta Galung	(Zimbabwe) Takanyi Garanganga (Bosnia and Herzegovina) Tomislav Brkić (Germany) Yannick Maden (Serbia) Petar Čonkić
March 21	Turkey F12 Futures; Antalya, Turkey; Hard $10,000; Singles and doubles draws	(Venezuela) Jordi Muñoz Abreu (Spain) David Pérez Sanz; 6–0, 6–3	(Netherlands) Jesse Huta Galung (Bulgaria) Alexandar Lazov	(Russia) Kirill Dmitriev (Netherlands) Jesse Huta Galung	(Zimbabwe) Takanyi Garanganga (Bosnia and Herzegovina) Tomislav Brkić (Germany) Yannick Maden (Serbia) Petar Čonkić
March 28	Bahrain F1 Futures; Manama, Bahrain; Hard $10,000; Singles and doubles draws	(Netherlands) Scott Griekspoor; 3–6, 6–3, 6–3	(Germany) Yannick Maden	(United States) Cameron Silverman (Germany) Tobias Simon	(India) Kunal Anand (Netherlands) Lennert van der Linden (Netherlands) Tallon Griekspoor (Republic of Ireland) Sam Barry
March 28	Bahrain F1 Futures; Manama, Bahrain; Hard $10,000; Singles and doubles draws	(United States) Cameron Silverman (United States) Quinton Vega; 6–0, 6–3	(Netherlands) Scott Griekspoor (Netherlands) Tallon Griekspoor	(United States) Cameron Silverman (Germany) Tobias Simon	(India) Kunal Anand (Netherlands) Lennert van der Linden (Netherlands) Tallon Griekspoor (Republic of Ireland) Sam Barry
March 28	Egypt F11 Futures; Sharm El Sheikh, Egypt; Hard $10,000; Singles and doubles draws	(Czech Republic) Jaroslav Pospíšil; 6–4, 6–4	(Italy) Andrea Vavassori	(Spain) Pol Toledo Bagué (Czech Republic) Tomáš Papík	(Spain) José Francisco Vidal Azorín (Portugal) André Gaspar Murta (Poland) Adrian Andrzejczuk (Ukraine) Vadim Alekseenko
March 28	Egypt F11 Futures; Sharm El Sheikh, Egypt; Hard $10,000; Singles and doubles draws	(Czech Republic) Petr Hájek (Czech Republic) Jaroslav Pospíšil; 7–6^{(7–4)}, 7–5	(United States) Anderson Reed (South Africa) Tucker Vorster	(Spain) Pol Toledo Bagué (Czech Republic) Tomáš Papík	(Spain) José Francisco Vidal Azorín (Portugal) André Gaspar Murta (Poland) Adrian Andrzejczuk (Ukraine) Vadim Alekseenko
March 28	Greece F2 Futures; Heraklion, Greece; Hard $10,000; Singles and doubles draws	(Belarus) Maxim Dubarenco; 6–3, 6–7^{(2–7)}, 6–3	(Serbia) Miki Janković	(Slovakia) Alex Molčan (France) Corentin Denolly	(Sweden) Markus Eriksson (Sweden) Isak Arvidsson (Italy) Erik Crepaldi (Czech Republic) Petr Michnev
March 28	Greece F2 Futures; Heraklion, Greece; Hard $10,000; Singles and doubles draws	(Greece) Konstantinos Economidis (Greece) Stefanos Tsitsipas; 4–6, 7–6^{(7–5)}, [10–5]	(Czech Republic) Petr Michnev (Czech Republic) Václav Šafránek	(Slovakia) Alex Molčan (France) Corentin Denolly	(Sweden) Markus Eriksson (Sweden) Isak Arvidsson (Italy) Erik Crepaldi (Czech Republic) Petr Michnev
March 28	Japan F4 Futures; Tsukuba, Japan; Hard $10,000; Singles and doubles draws	(Japan) Yosuke Watanuki; 1–6, 6–4, 6–2	(Japan) Shintaro Imai	(South Korea) Kwon Soon-woo (New Zealand) Finn Tearney	(Japan) Ryota Tanuma (China) He Yecong (Japan) Makoto Ochi (South Korea) Sin San-hui
March 28	Japan F4 Futures; Tsukuba, Japan; Hard $10,000; Singles and doubles draws	(New Zealand) Ben McLachlan (New Zealand) Finn Tearney; 3–6, 6–4, [10–4]	(Japan) Yuichi Ito (Japan) Sho Katayama	(South Korea) Kwon Soon-woo (New Zealand) Finn Tearney	(Japan) Ryota Tanuma (China) He Yecong (Japan) Makoto Ochi (South Korea) Sin San-hui
March 28	Spain F7 Futures; Madrid, Spain; Hard $10,000; Singles and doubles draws	(Japan) Akira Santillan; 6–4, 7–6^{(7–5)}	(Canada) Steven Diez	(Germany) Daniel Masur (Spain) Roberto Ortega Olmedo	(Norway) Viktor Durasovic (Germany) Oscar Otte (Spain) Carlos Boluda-Purkiss (Spain) Álvaro López San Martín
March 28	Spain F7 Futures; Madrid, Spain; Hard $10,000; Singles and doubles draws	(Germany) Andreas Mies (Germany) Oscar Otte; 2–6, 6–1, [10–3]	(Romania) Patrick Grigoriu (Romania) Luca George Tatomir	(Germany) Daniel Masur (Spain) Roberto Ortega Olmedo	(Norway) Viktor Durasovic (Germany) Oscar Otte (Spain) Carlos Boluda-Purkiss (Spain) Álvaro López San Martín
March 28	Tunisia F12 Futures; Hammamet, Tunisia; Clay $10,000; Singles and doubles draws	(United Kingdom) Alexander Ward; 7–6^{(8–6)}, 6–0	(Portugal) Pedro Sousa	(Belgium) Omar Salman (Belgium) Clément Geens	(Serbia) Miljan Zekić (Germany) Maximilian Marterer (Spain) David Vega Hernández (Spain) Oriol Roca Batalla
March 28	Tunisia F12 Futures; Hammamet, Tunisia; Clay $10,000; Singles and doubles draws	(Spain) Oriol Roca Batalla (Spain) David Vega Hernández; 6–4, 6–2	(Australia) Dan Dowson (United Kingdom) Alexander Ward	(Belgium) Omar Salman (Belgium) Clément Geens	(Serbia) Miljan Zekić (Germany) Maximilian Marterer (Spain) David Vega Hernández (Spain) Oriol Roca Batalla
March 28	Turkey F13 Futures; Antalya, Turkey; Hard $10,000; Singles and doubles draws	(Spain) David Pérez Sanz; 6–2, 7–6^{(7–1)}	(Turkey) Cem İlkel	(Slovakia) Filip Horanský (Germany) Marc Sieber	(Austria) David Pichler (Turkey) Anıl Yüksel (Serbia) Petar Čonkić (Slovenia) Mike Urbanija
March 28	Turkey F13 Futures; Antalya, Turkey; Hard $10,000; Singles and doubles draws	(Turkey) Muhammet Haylaz (Turkey) Anıl Yüksel; 6–2, 4–6, [10–8]	(Turkey) Sarp Ağabigün (Austria) David Pichler	(Slovakia) Filip Horanský (Germany) Marc Sieber	(Austria) David Pichler (Turkey) Anıl Yüksel (Serbia) Petar Čonkić (Slovenia) Mike Urbanija
