= 2016 RC Hotel Open =

- Date: 7–13 March
- Edition: 1st
- Draw: 32S / 16D
- Prize money: €42,500+H
- Surface: Hard
- Location: Jönköping, Sweden

Champions

Singles
- (Kazakhstan) Andrey Golubev

Doubles
- (Sweden) Isak Arvidsson / (Sweden) Fred Simonsson
RC Hotel Open	· 2017 →

The 2016 RC Hotel Open was a professional tennis tournament played on hard courts. It was the first edition of the tournament which was part of the 2016 ATP Challenger Tour. It took place in Jönköping, Sweden between 7 and 13 March 2016.

== Singles main-draw entrants ==
=== Seeds ===
Country	Player	Rank^{1}	Seed
SRB	Filip Krajinović	97	1
GER	Dustin Brown	100	2
GER	Jan-Lennard Struff	108	3
SVK	Lukáš Lacko	109	4
POR	Gastão Elias	121	5
RUS	Konstantin Kravchuk	129	6
BIH	Mirza Bašić	133	7
MDA	Radu Albot	145	8

- ^{1} Rankings as of February 29, 2016.

=== Other entrants ===
The following players received wildcards into the singles main draw:

- (Sweden) Isak Arvidsson
- (France) Elliot Benchetrit
- (Sweden) Markus Eriksson
- (Sweden) Daniel Windahl

The following players received entry courtesy of a special exemption:

- (Croatia) Nikola Mektić

The following players received entry from the qualifying draw:

- (France) Constant Lestienne
- (Netherlands) Matwé Middelkoop
- (Spain) Roberto Ortega-Olmedo
- (Sweden) Patrik Rosenholm

The following player received entry as a lucky loser:

- (Russia) Evgeny Karlovskiy

== Champions ==
=== Singles ===
- (Kazakhstan) Andrey Golubev def. (Russia) Karen Khachanov, 6–7^{(9–11)}, 7–6^{(7–5)}, 7–6^{(7–4)}

=== Doubles ===
- (Sweden) Isak Arvidsson / (Sweden) Fred Simonsson def. (Sweden) Markus Eriksson / (Sweden) Milos Sekulic, 6–3, 3–6, [10–6]
