= RC Hotel Open =

- 2016 RC Hotel Open

Defunct tennis tournament
- Location: Jönköping, Sweden
- Venue: RC Arena
- Category: ATP Challenger Tour (2016)
- Surface: Hard / Indoors
- Draw: 32S/32Q/16D
- Prize money: €42,500+H
- Website: website

The RC Hotel Open was a tennis tournament held in Jönköping, Sweden and was played on indoor hardcourts. From 2012 to 2014 and in 2017 and 2021, the tournament was part of the ITF Men's Circuit. The event was part of the ATP Challenger Tour in 2016.

== Past finals ==
=== Singles ===
Year	Champion	Runner-up	Score
2016	(Kazakhstan) Andrey Golubev	(Russia) Karen Khachanov	6–7^{(9–11)}, 7–6^{(7–5)}, 7–6^{(7–4)}

=== Doubles ===
Year	Champions	Runners-up	Score
2016	(Sweden) Isak Arvidsson (Sweden) Fred Simonsson	(Sweden) Markus Eriksson (Sweden) Milos Sekulic	6–3, 3–6, [10–6]
