= Daniel Windahl =

Swedish tennis player

- Country (sports): Sweden
- Residence: Stockholm, Sweden
- Born: 20 July 1996 (age 29) Helsingborg, Sweden
- Height: 1.88 m (6 ft 2 in)
- Retired: 2016
- Plays: Right-handed (two-handed backhand)
- Prize money: $12,243

Singles
- Career record: 0–2 (at ATP Tour level, Grand Slam level, and in Davis Cup)
- Career titles: 0
- Highest ranking: No. 825 (8 September 2014)

Grand Slam singles results
- Australian Open Junior: 1R (2014)
- Wimbledon Junior: 2R (2013)

Doubles
- Career record: 0–0 (at ATP Tour level, Grand Slam level, and in Davis Cup)
- Career titles: 2 ITF
- Highest ranking: No. 618 (16 May 2016)

Grand Slam doubles results
- Australian Open Junior: 1R (2014)
- Wimbledon Junior: 1R (2013)

Team competitions
- Davis Cup: 0–2
- Last updated on: 5 August 2019.

Daniel Windahl (born 20 July 1996) is a Swedish tennis player.

Windahl has a career high ATP singles ranking of 825 achieved on 8 September 2014. He also has a career high ATP doubles ranking of 618, achieved on 16 May 2016. Windahl has won 2 ITF doubles titles.

Windahl has represented Sweden at Davis Cup, where he has a win–loss record of 0–2.

== ITF Futures titles ==
=== Doubles: 2 ===
No.	Date	Tournament	Tier	Surface	Partner	Opponents	Score
1.	Jul 2015	Austria F2, Seefeld	Futures	Clay	(Sweden) Isak Arvidsson	(Brazil) Eduardo Dischinger (Brazil) Caio Silva	2–6, 7–5, [10–4]
2.	Jan 2016	Turkey F2, Antalya	Futures	Hard	(Sweden) Lucas Renard	(Turkey) Muhammet Haylaz (Turkey) Anıl Yüksel	6–4, 6–1
