= 2017 Båstad Challenger – Singles =

Singles
- 2017 Båstad Challenger

Final
- Champion: (Serbia) Dušan Lajović
- Runner-up: (Argentina) Leonardo Mayer
- Score: 6–2, 7–6^{(7–4)}

Events
Singles	Doubles
← 2016 ·	Båstad Challenger	· 2018 →

Horacio Zeballos was the defending champion but chose not to defend his title.

Dušan Lajović won the title after defeating Leonardo Mayer 6–2, 7–6^{(7–4)} in the final.

== Seeds ==
1. (Serbia) Dušan Lajović (champion)
2. (Argentina) Renzo Olivo (quarterfinals)
3. (Switzerland) Henri Laaksonen (quarterfinals)
4. (Argentina) Facundo Bagnis (semifinals)
5. (Norway) Casper Ruud (first round)
6. (Belgium) Arthur De Greef (second round)
7. (Spain) Roberto Carballés Baena (second round)
8. (Spain) Guillermo García López (second round)

== Draw ==
=== Key ===
- Q = Qualifier
- WC = Wild card
- LL = Lucky loser
- Alt = Alternate
- SE = Special exempt
- PR = Protected ranking
- ITF = ITF entry
- JE = Junior exempt
- w/o = Walkover
- r = Retired
- d = Defaulted
- SR = Special ranking

=== Finals ===
Semifinals
1	(Serbia) Dušan Lajović	7^{7}	6
4	(Argentina) Facundo Bagnis	6^{4}	3
(Argentina) Leonardo Mayer	6	6
WC	(Sweden) Mikael Ymer	3	0

Final
1	(Serbia) Dušan Lajović	6	7^{7}
(Argentina) Leonardo Mayer	2	6^{4}

=== Top half ===
First round
1	(Serbia) D Lajović	4	6	6
WC	(Sweden) M Eriksson	6	4	2
(Belgium) K Coppejans	6	7
(Germany) T Kamke	3	5
WC	(Sweden) C Söderlund	4	4
WC	(Sweden) E Ymer	6	6
Q	(Poland) H Hurkacz	6	3	3
6	(Belgium) A De Greef	4	6	6
4	(Argentina) F Bagnis	6	6
(France) M Bourgue	3	2
Alt	(France) C Hemery	6^{5}	6	5
(Portugal) J Domingues	7^{7}	4	7
(Kazakhstan) A Nedovyesov	6	5	6
(France) S Robert	2	7	4
Q	(Sweden) F Simonsson	3	2
8	(Spain) G García López	6	6

Second round
1	(Serbia) D Lajović	6	6
(Belgium) K Coppejans	2	3
WC	(Sweden) E Ymer	6	6
6	(Belgium) A De Greef	3	1
4	(Argentina) F Bagnis	6	6
(Portugal) J Domingues	1	3
(Kazakhstan) A Nedovyesov	6	6
8	(Spain) G García López	2	4

Quarterfinals
1	(Serbia) D Lajović	6	7
WC	(Sweden) E Ymer	3	5
4	(Argentina) F Bagnis	6	6
(Kazakhstan) A Nedovyesov	2	2

Semifinals
1	(Serbia) D Lajović	7^{7}	6
4	(Argentina) F Bagnis	6^{4}	3

=== Bottom half ===
First round
5	(Norway) C Ruud	6	6^{6}	4
(Argentina) L Mayer	3	7^{8}	6
(Chile) C Garin	1	1
(Serbia) F Krajinović	6	6
Alt	(Poland) K Majchrzak	4	6	6
Q	(Argentina) JI Londero	6	2	3
(France) T Lamasine	1	4
3	(Switzerland) H Laaksonen	6	6
7	(Spain) R Carballés Baena	6	3
(Italy) R Bellotti	0	0^{r}
WC	(Sweden) M Ymer	1	7	6
(Spain) Í Cervantes	6	5	3
Q	(Sweden) I Arvidsson	6	6
(Czech Republic) V Šafránek	3	3
(Spain) T Robredo	2	5
2	(Argentina) R Olivo	6	7

Second round
(Argentina) L Mayer	7^{7}	6
(Serbia) F Krajinović	6^{5}	3
Alt	(Poland) K Majchrzak	4	1
3	(Switzerland) H Laaksonen	6	6
7	(Spain) R Carballés Baena	6	5	2
WC	(Sweden) M Ymer	4	7	6
Q	(Sweden) I Arvidsson	5	6^{3}
2	(Argentina) R Olivo	7	7^{7}

Quarterfinals
(Argentina) L Mayer	3	6	6
3	(Switzerland) H Laaksonen	6	3	2
WC	(Sweden) M Ymer	6	6
2	(Argentina) R Olivo	2	4

Semifinals
(Argentina) L Mayer	6	6
WC	(Sweden) M Ymer	3	0
