= 2017 Båstad Challenger =

Professional tennis tournament

- Date: 10–15 July
- Edition: 2nd
- Draw: 32S / 16D
- Surface: Clay / Outdoors
- Location: Båstad, Sweden

Champions

Singles
- (Serbia) Dušan Lajović

Doubles
- (Turkey) Tuna Altuna / (Czech Republic) Václav Šafránek
← 2016 ·	Båstad Challenger	· 2018 →

The 2017 Båstad Challenger was a professional tennis tournament played on clay courts. It was the second edition of the tournament which was part of the 2017 ATP Challenger Tour. It took place in Båstad, Sweden between 10 and 15 July 2017.

== Singles main-draw entrants ==
=== Seeds ===
Country	Player	Rank^{1}	Seed
SRB	Dušan Lajović	79	1
ARG	Renzo Olivo	89	2
SUI	Henri Laaksonen	104	3
ARG	Facundo Bagnis	107	4
NOR	Casper Ruud	111	5
BEL	Arthur De Greef	116	6
ESP	Roberto Carballés Baena	134	7
ESP	Guillermo García López	143	8

- ^{1} Rankings are as of 3 July 2017.

=== Other entrants ===
The following players received wildcards into the singles main draw:

- (Sweden) Markus Eriksson
- (Sweden) Carl Söderlund
- (Sweden) Elias Ymer
- (Sweden) Mikael Ymer

The following players received entry into the singles main draw as alternates:

- (France) Calvin Hemery
- (Poland) Kamil Majchrzak

The following players received entry from the qualifying draw:

- (Sweden) Isak Arvidsson
- (Poland) Hubert Hurkacz
- (Argentina) Juan Ignacio Londero
- (Sweden) Fred Simonsson

== Champions ==
=== Singles ===
- (Serbia) Dušan Lajović def. (Argentina) Leonardo Mayer 6–2, 7–6^{(7–4)}.

=== Doubles ===
- (Turkey) Tuna Altuna / (Czech Republic) Václav Šafránek def. (India) Sriram Balaji / (India) Vijay Sundar Prashanth 6–1, 6–4.
