= 2016 Båstad Challenger – Doubles =

Doubles
- 2016 Båstad Challenger

Final
- Champion: (Sweden) Isak Arvidsson (Sweden) Fred Simonsson
- Runner-up: (Sweden) Johan Brunström (Sweden) Andreas Siljeström
- Score: 6–3, 7–5

Events
Singles	Doubles
Båstad Challenger	· 2017 →

This was the first edition of the tournament.

Isak Arvidsson and Fred Simonsson won the title after defeating Johan Brunström and Andreas Siljeström 6–3, 7–5 in the final.

== Seeds ==
1. (Chile) Julio Peralta / (Argentina) Horacio Zeballos (semifinals)
2. (Sweden) Johan Brunström / (Sweden) Andreas Siljeström (final)
3. (China) Gong Maoxin / (China) Zhang Ze (first round)
4. (Italy) Thomas Fabbiano / (Estonia) Jürgen Zopp (semifinals)

== Draw ==
=== Key ===
- Q = Qualifier
- WC = Wild card
- LL = Lucky loser
- Alt = Alternate
- SE = Special exempt
- PR = Protected ranking
- ITF = ITF entry
- JE = Junior exempt
- w/o = Walkover
- r = Retired
- d = Defaulted
- SR = Special ranking

First round
1	(Chile) J Peralta (Argentina) H Zeballos	6	6
WC	(Sweden) F Bergevi (Sweden) C Söderlund	2	4
(Russia) A Karatsev (Serbia) M Tepavac	w/o
(Spain) R Carballés Baena (Spain) P Riba
3	(China) M Gong (China) Z Zhang	3	4
(Sweden) I Arvidsson (Sweden) F Simonsson	6	6
(Brazil) A Ghem (Spain) A Montañés	6	6
(Serbia) L Đere (Serbia) M Janković	3	3
WC	(Sweden) Daniel Appelgren (Sweden) J Mridha	3	4
(Sweden) M Eriksson (Sweden) M Sekulic	6	6
(Australia) S de Waard (Sweden) C Lindell
4	(Italy) T Fabbiano (Estonia) J Zopp	w/o
WC	(Poland) H Hurkacz (Sweden) P Rosenholm	6	3	[7]
(Belarus) M Dubarenco (Uzbekistan) F Dustov	3	6	[10]
(Argentina) N Kicker (Argentina) A Velotti	2	1
2	(Sweden) J Brunström (Sweden) A Siljeström	6	6

Quarterfinals
1	(Chile) J Peralta (Argentina) H Zeballos	6	6
(Russia) A Karatsev (Serbia) M Tepavac	1	3
(Sweden) I Arvidsson (Sweden) F Simonsson	6	6
(Brazil) A Ghem (Spain) A Montañés	4	2
(Sweden) M Eriksson (Sweden) M Sekulic	3	3
4	(Italy) T Fabbiano (Estonia) J Zopp	6	6
(Belarus) M Dubarenco (Uzbekistan) F Dustov	1	0
2	(Sweden) J Brunström (Sweden) A Siljeström	6	6

Semifinals
1	(Chile) J Peralta (Argentina) H Zeballos	6	3	[11]
(Sweden) I Arvidsson (Sweden) F Simonsson	2	6	[13]
4	(Italy) T Fabbiano (Estonia) J Zopp	4	6	[7]
2	(Sweden) J Brunström (Sweden) A Siljeström	6	3	[10]

Final
(Sweden) I Arvidsson (Sweden) F Simonsson	6	7
2	(Sweden) J Brunström (Sweden) A Siljeström	3	5
