= 2016 Båstad Challenger – Singles =

Singles
- 2016 Båstad Challenger

Final
- Champion: (Argentina) Horacio Zeballos
- Runner-up: (Spain) Roberto Carballés Baena
- Score: 6–3, 6–4

Events
| Singles | Doubles |
| Båstad Challenger | · 2017 → |

This was the first edition of the tournament.

Horacio Zeballos won the title after defeating Roberto Carballés Baena 6–3, 6–4 in the final.

== Seeds ==
1. (Russia) Evgeny Donskoy (second round)
2. (Argentina) Horacio Zeballos (champion)
3. (Argentina) Carlos Berlocq (semifinals)
4. (Italy) Thomas Fabbiano (second round)
5. (Spain) Roberto Carballés Baena (final)
6. (Spain) Albert Montañés (quarterfinals)
7. (Spain) Daniel Muñoz de la Nava (first round)
8. (Argentina) Nicolás Kicker (second round)

== Draw ==
=== Key ===
- Q = Qualifier
- WC = Wild card
- LL = Lucky loser
- Alt = Alternate
- SE = Special exempt
- PR = Protected ranking
- ITF = ITF entry
- JE = Junior exempt
- w/o = Walkover
- r = Retired
- d = Defaulted
- SR = Special ranking

=== Finals ===
Semifinals
5 | (Spain) Roberto Carballés Baena | 6 | 6
WC | (Sweden) Carl Söderlund | 4 | 0
3 | (Argentina) Carlos Berlocq | 3 | 6 | 2
2 | (Argentina) Horacio Zeballos | 6 | 2 | 6

Final
5 | (Spain) Roberto Carballés Baena | 3 | 4
2 | (Argentina) Horacio Zeballos | 6 | 6

=== Top half ===
First round
1 | (Russia) E Donskoy | 6 | 6
(Portugal) FF Silva | 4 | 3
(Switzerland) H Laaksonen | 6 | 2 | 6
WC | (Sweden) M Eriksson | 3 | 6 | 3
WC | (Sweden) I Arvidsson | 6 | 7^{9}
(Serbia) M Janković | 2 | 6^{7}
Q | (Netherlands) S Griekspoor | 2 | 4
5 | (Spain) R Carballés Baena | 6 | 6
4 | (Italy) T Fabbiano | 3 | 6 | 6
(Sweden) E Ymer | 6 | 4 | 2
WC | (Sweden) C Söderlund | 7 | 6
WC | (Sweden) C Lindell | 5 | 2
(Spain) D Gimeno-Traver | 6^{5} | 6 | 6
(Estonia) J Zopp | 7^{7} | 4 | 1
(Uzbekistan) F Dustov | 4 | 6 | 6
7 | (Spain) D Muñoz de la Nava | 6 | 2 | 2

Second round
1 | (Russia) E Donskoy | 2 | 4
(Switzerland) H Laaksonen | 6 | 6
WC | (Sweden) I Arvidsson | 4 | 4
5 | (Spain) R Carballés Baena | 6 | 6
4 | (Italy) T Fabbiano | 4 | 6^{4}
WC | (Sweden) C Söderlund | 6 | 7^{7}
(Spain) D Gimeno-Traver | 6 | 6
(Uzbekistan) F Dustov | 2 | 2

Quarterfinals
(Switzerland) H Laaksonen | 3 | 3
5 | (Spain) R Carballés Baena | 6 | 6
WC | (Sweden) C Söderlund | 5 | 6 | 6
(Spain) D Gimeno-Traver | 7 | 1 | 4

Semifinals
5 | (Spain) R Carballés Baena | 6 | 6
WC | (Sweden) C Söderlund | 4 | 0

=== Bottom half ===
First round
6 | (Spain) A Montañés | 6 | 7
(Argentina) A Velotti | 2 | 5
(Italy) M Viola | 5 | 6 | 6^{2}
(Slovenia) G Žemlja | 7 | 1 | 7^{7}
(Russia) A Rublev | 6^{3} | 7 | 7^{7}
Q | (India) P Gunneswaran | 7^{7} | 5 | 6^{3}
LL | (Poland) H Hurkacz | 2 | 3
3 | (Argentina) C Berlocq | 6 | 6
8 | (Argentina) N Kicker | 7 | 6
Q | (Belarus) M Dubarenco | 5 | 2
(Serbia) L Đere | 3 | 0
(Serbia) M Tepavac | 6 | 6
(Brazil) A Ghem | 4 | 4
(Russia) A Karatsev | 6 | 6
Q | (China) Z Zhang | 4 | 2
2 | (Argentina) H Zeballos | 6 | 6

Second round
6 | (Spain) A Montañés | 6 | 6
(Slovenia) G Žemlja | 2 | 3
(Russia) A Rublev | 3 | 7^{7} | 2
3 | (Argentina) C Berlocq | 6 | 6^{5} | 6
8 | (Argentina) N Kicker | 2 | 6^{2}
(Serbia) M Tepavac | 6 | 7^{7}
(Russia) A Karatsev | 2 | 1
2 | (Argentina) H Zeballos | 6 | 6

Quarterfinals
6 | (Spain) A Montañés | 6 | 2 | 3
3 | (Argentina) C Berlocq | 2 | 6 | 6
(Serbia) M Tepavac | 6^{5} | 4
2 | (Argentina) H Zeballos | 7^{7} | 6

Semifinals
3 | (Argentina) C Berlocq | 3 | 6 | 2
2 | (Argentina) H Zeballos | 6 | 2 | 6
