= 2017 Båstad Challenger – Doubles =

Doubles
- 2017 Båstad Challenger

Final
- Champions: (Turkey) Tuna Altuna (Czech Republic) Václav Šafránek
- Runners-up: (India) Sriram Balaji (India) Vijay Sundar Prashanth
- Score: 6–1, 6–4

Events
Singles	Doubles
- Båstad Challenger

Isak Arvidsson and Fred Simonsson were the defending champions but lost in the first round to Calvin Hemery and Stéphane Robert.

Tuna Altuna and Václav Šafránek won the title after defeating Sriram Balaji and Vijay Sundar Prashanth 6–1, 6–4 in the final.

== Seeds ==
1. (Sweden) Johan Brunström / (Sweden) Andreas Siljeström (quarterfinals)
2. (Australia) Steven de Waard / (Japan) Ben McLachlan (first round)
3. (Peru) Sergio Galdós / (Argentina) Leonardo Mayer (semifinals)
4. (Sweden) Isak Arvidsson / (Sweden) Fred Simonsson (first round)

== Draw ==
Key

- Q = Qualifier
- WC = Wild card
- LL = Lucky loser
- Alt = Alternate
- ITF = ITF entry
- PR = Protected ranking
- SR = Special ranking
- SE = Special exempt
- JE = Junior exempt
- JR = Junior Accelerator Programme entrant
- CO = College Accelerator Programme entrant
- NG = Next Gen Accelerator Program entrant
- w/o = Walkover
- r = Retired
- d = Defaulted

First round
1	(Sweden) J Brunström (Sweden) A Siljeström	7^{8}	6^{5}	[11]
(Spain) R Carballés Baena (Spain) Í Cervantes	6^{6}	7^{7}	[9]
(India) S Balaji (India) VS Prashanth	4	6	[10]
WC	(Sweden) M Eriksson (Sweden) M Sekulic	6	4	[6]
3	(Peru) S Galdós (Argentina) L Mayer	7^{8}	6
WC	(Sweden) F Bergevi (Sweden) A Göransson	6^{6}	3
(Portugal) J Domingues (Argentina) JI Londero	4	3
(Sweden) E Ymer (Sweden) M Ymer	6	6
WC	(Sweden) Jonas Eriksson Ziverts (Sweden) K Friberg	2	6	[4]
(Turkey) T Altuna (Czech Republic) V Šafránek	6	2	[10]
(France) C Hemery (France) S Robert	5	6	[10]
4	(Sweden) I Arvidsson (Sweden) F Simonsson	7	4	[8]
(Poland) H Hurkacz (Poland) K Majchrzak	7	5	[10]
(Belgium) K Coppejans (France) T Lamasine	5	7	[4]
(Argentina) F Bagnis (Argentina) R Olivo	6	3	[10]
2	(Australia) S de Waard (Japan) B McLachlan	2	6	[7]

Quarterfinals
1	(Sweden) J Brunström (Sweden) A Siljeström	2	6^{5}
(India) S Balaji (India) VS Prashanth	6	7^{7}
3	(Peru) S Galdós (Argentina) L Mayer	3	6	[10]
(Sweden) E Ymer (Sweden) M Ymer	6	3	[8]
(Turkey) T Altuna (Czech Republic) V Šafránek	7^{7}	6
(France) C Hemery (France) S Robert	6^{4}	3
(Poland) H Hurkacz (Poland) K Majchrzak	6	4	[10]
(Argentina) F Bagnis (Argentina) R Olivo	4	6	[8]

Semifinals
(India) S Balaji (India) VS Prashanth	3	6	[10]
3	(Peru) S Galdós (Argentina) L Mayer	6	4	[1]
(Turkey) T Altuna (Czech Republic) V Šafránek	7^{11}	2	[10]
(Poland) H Hurkacz (Poland) K Majchrzak	6^{9}	6	[8]

Final
(India) S Balaji (India) VS Prashanth	1	4
(Turkey) T Altuna (Czech Republic) V Šafránek	6	6
