= 2016 Swedish Open – Men's singles =

Men's singles
- 2016 Swedish Open

Final
- Champion: (Spain) Albert Ramos Viñolas
- Runner-up: (Spain) Fernando Verdasco
- Score: 6–3, 6–4

Details
- Draw: 28
- Seeds: 8

Events
Singles	men	women
Doubles	men	women
← 2015 ·	Swedish Open	· 2017 →

Benoît Paire was the defending champion, but chose to compete in Hamburg instead.

Albert Ramos Viñolas won his first ATP title, defeating Fernando Verdasco in the final, 6–3, 6–4.

== Seeds ==
The top four seeds receive a bye into the second round.

1. (Spain) David Ferrer (semifinals)
2. (Portugal) João Sousa (quarterfinals)
3. (Spain) Albert Ramos Viñolas (champion)
4. (Spain) Marcel Granollers (second round)
5. (Spain) Fernando Verdasco (final)
6. (United Kingdom) Aljaž Bedene (second round)
7. (Argentina) Diego Schwartzman (withdrew)
8. (Russia) Evgeny Donskoy (second round)
9. (Argentina) Horacio Zeballos (first round)

== Draw ==
=== Key ===
- Q = Qualifier
- WC = Wild card
- LL = Lucky loser
- Alt = Alternate
- SE = Special exempt
- PR = Protected ranking
- ITF = ITF entry
- JE = Junior exempt
- w/o = Walkover
- r = Retired
- d = Defaulted
- SR = Special ranking

=== Finals ===
Semifinals
1	(Spain) David Ferrer	5	4
3	(Spain) Albert Ramos Viñolas	7	6
5	(Spain) Fernando Verdasco	6	6
(Portugal) Gastão Elias	3	1

Final
3	(Spain) Albert Ramos Viñolas	6	6
5	(Spain) Fernando Verdasco	3	4

=== Top half ===
First round
Q	(France) C Hemery	6	4	6
Q	(France) T Lamasine	4	6	3
(Germany) D Brown	6	7^{8}
(Spain) D Muñoz de la Nava	2	6^{6}
WC	(Sweden) I Arvidsson	4	6^{4}
6	(United Kingdom) A Bedene	6	7^{7}
(Germany) M Berrer	5	5
(Spain) R Carballés Baena	7	7
(Argentina) M Trungelliti	6	4	3
(Italy) A Arnaboldi	2	6	6
(Russia) K Khachanov	6	6^{4}	3
8	(Russia) E Donskoy	3	7^{7}	6

Second round
1	(Spain) D Ferrer	3	7	6
Q	(France) C Hemery	6	5	3
(Germany) D Brown	6	6^{5}	6
6	(United Kingdom) A Bedene	3	7^{7}	3
3	(Spain) A Ramos Viñolas	7^{7}	6
(Spain) R Carballés Baena	6^{5}	3
(Italy) A Arnaboldi	6	6
8	(Russia) E Donskoy	3	2

Quarterfinals
1	(Spain) D Ferrer	6	4	6
(Germany) D Brown	1	6	4
3	(Spain) A Ramos Viñolas	5	7	6
(Italy) A Arnaboldi	7	5	0

Semifinals
1	(Spain) D Ferrer	5	4
3	(Spain) A Ramos Viñolas	7	6

=== Bottom half ===
First round
5	(Spain) F Verdasco	6	6
Q	(Switzerland) H Laaksonen	3	2
(Spain) A Montañés	6	6
(Sweden) E Ymer	4	2
(Estonia) J Zopp	1	7^{7}	1
(Argentina) F Bagnis	6	6^{5}	6
9	(Argentina) H Zeballos	4	2
(Japan) T Daniel	6	6
Q	(Sweden) C Lindell	1	4
(Portugal) G Elias	6	6
WC	(Sweden) F Simonsson	3	6	6^{5}
WC	(Sweden) C Söderlund	6	3	7^{7}

Second round
5	(Spain) F Verdasco	6	6
(Spain) A Montañés	3	2
(Argentina) F Bagnis	7	6
4	(Spain) M Granollers	5	3
(Japan) T Daniel	6^{1}	6	2
(Portugal) G Elias	7^{7}	3	6
WC	(Sweden) C Söderlund	3	1
2	(Portugal) J Sousa	6	6

Quarterfinals
5	(Spain) F Verdasco	6	6
(Argentina) F Bagnis	2	1
(Portugal) G Elias	6	6
2	(Portugal) J Sousa	2	2

Semifinals
5	(Spain) F Verdasco	6	6
(Portugal) G Elias	3	1

== Qualifying ==
=== Seeds ===
1. (Estonia) Jürgen Zopp (moved to main draw)
2. (Switzerland) Henri Laaksonen (qualified)
3. (Serbia) Marko Tepavac (first round)
4. (Brazil) André Ghem (qualifying competition)
5. (France) Tristan Lamasine (qualified)
6. (Netherlands) Scott Griekspoor (qualifying competition)
7. (Croatia) Nikola Mektić (first round)
8. (Sweden) Christian Lindell (qualified)

=== Qualifiers ===
1. (France) Calvin Hemery
2. (Switzerland) Henri Laaksonen
3. (Sweden) Christian Lindell
4. (France) Tristan Lamasine

=== Qualifying draw ===
==== First qualifier ====
First round
Alt	(Sweden) Milos Sekulic	7^{9}	5	4
PR	(Croatia) Nikola Ćaćić	6^{7}	7	6
WC	(France) Calvin Hemery	6	7^{7}
7	(Croatia) Nikola Mektić	3	6^{4}

Qualifying competition
PR	(Croatia) Nikola Ćaćić	1	2
WC	(France) Calvin Hemery	6	6

==== Second qualifier ====
First round
2	(Switzerland) Henri Laaksonen	6	4	6
Alt	(Sweden) Markus Eriksson	4	6	4
WC	(Sweden) Daniel Appelgren	4	4
6	(Netherlands) Scott Griekspoor	6	6

Qualifying competition
2	(Switzerland) Henri Laaksonen	6	6
6	(Netherlands) Scott Griekspoor	4	2

==== Third qualifier ====
First round
3	(Serbia) Marko Tepavac	5	6	4
(Belarus) Maxim Dubarenco	7	1	6
(Italy) Marco Bortolotti	2	4
8	(Sweden) Christian Lindell	6	6

Qualifying competition
(Belarus) Maxim Dubarenco	2	4
8	(Sweden) Christian Lindell	6	6

==== Fourth qualifier ====
First round
4	(Brazil) André Ghem	6	6
(Romania) Dragoș Dima	1	0
(Argentina) Juan Ignacio Galarza	7	3	1
5	(France) Tristan Lamasine	5	6	6

Qualifying competition
4	(Brazil) André Ghem	5	4
5	(France) Tristan Lamasine	7	6
