= 2018 Båstad Challenger – Doubles =

Doubles
- 2018 Båstad Challenger

Final
- Champions: (Finland) Harri Heliövaara; (Switzerland) Henri Laaksonen
- Runners-up: (Czech Republic) Zdeněk Kolář; (Portugal) Gonçalo Oliveira
- Score: 6–4, 6–3

Events
Singles	Doubles
- Båstad Challenger

Tuna Altuna and Václav Šafránek were the defending champions but only Altuna chose to defend his title, partnering Elias Ymer. Altuna lost in the first round to Julio Peralta and Horacio Zeballos.

Harri Heliövaara and Henri Laaksonen won the title after defeating Zdeněk Kolář and Gonçalo Oliveira 6–4, 6–3 in the final.

== Seeds ==
1. (Chile) Julio Peralta / (Argentina) Horacio Zeballos (semifinals)
2. (United States) Nathan Pasha / (United States) Hunter Reese (quarterfinals)
3. (Czech Republic) Zdeněk Kolář / (Portugal) Gonçalo Oliveira (final)
4. (China) Gong Maoxin / (China) Zhang Ze (quarterfinals)

== Draw ==
Key

- Q = Qualifier
- WC = Wild card
- LL = Lucky loser
- Alt = Alternate
- ITF = ITF entry
- PR = Protected ranking
- SR = Special ranking
- SE = Special exempt
- JE = Junior exempt
- JR = Junior Accelerator Programme entrant
- CO = College Accelerator Programme entrant
- NG = Next Gen Accelerator Program entrant
- w/o = Walkover
- r = Retired
- d = Defaulted

First round

Quarterfinals

Semifinals

Final

1
- (Chile) J Peralta
- (Argentina) H Zeballos
6
6

- (Turkey) T Altuna
- (Sweden) E Ymer
3
1

1
- (Chile) J Peralta
- (Argentina) H Zeballos
7
6

- (Argentina) T Lipovšek Puches
- (Argentina) JI Londero
2
2

- (Argentina) G Andreozzi
- (Argentina) A Collarini
5
4

- (Argentina) G Andreozzi
- (Argentina) A Collarini
6
6

1
- (Chile) J Peralta
- (Argentina) H Zeballos
2
3

4
- (China) M Gong
- (China) Ze Zhang
7^{7}
4
[10]

- (Finland) H Heliövaara
- (Switzerland) H Laaksonen
6
6

- (South Africa) L Harris
- (Poland) S Walków
6^{5}
6
[6]

4
- (China) M Gong
- (China) Ze Zhang
4
4

WC
(Sweden) F Bergevi
(Sweden) Pablo Figueroa
2
1

- (Finland) H Heliövaara
- (Switzerland) H Laaksonen
6
6

- (Finland) H Heliövaara
- (Switzerland) H Laaksonen
6
6

- (Finland) H Heliövaara
- (Switzerland) H Laaksonen
6
6

WC
- (Sweden) A Göransson
- (Sweden) F Simonsson
4
4

3
- (Czech Republic) Z Kolář
- (Portugal) G Oliveira
4
3

- (France) C Hemery
- (France) J Tatlot
6
6

- (France) C Hemery
- (France) J Tatlot
1^{r}

WC
- (Sweden) Jonas Eriksson Ziverts
- (Sweden) K Friberg
2
3

3
- (Czech Republic) Z Kolář
- (Portugal) G Oliveira
4

3
- (Czech Republic) Z Kolář
- (Portugal) G Oliveira
6
6

3
- (Czech Republic) Z Kolář
- (Portugal) G Oliveira
6^{4}
6
[10]

- (Philippines) R Gonzales
- (United States) N Lammons
3
6
[10]

- (Philippines) R Gonzales
- (United States) N Lammons
7^{7}
4
[7]

- (Sweden) M Eriksson
- (Sweden) A Siljeström
6
3
[6]

- (Philippines) R Gonzales
- (United States) N Lammons
3
6
[10]

- (Spain) P Martínez
- (Netherlands) M Vervoort
3
4

2
- (United States) N Pasha
- (United States) H Reese
6
3
[5]

2
- (United States) N Pasha
- (United States) H Reese
6
6
