= 2014 Swedish Open – Men's singles =

Men's singles
- 2014 Swedish Open

Final
- Champion: (Uruguay) Pablo Cuevas
- Runner-up: (Portugal) João Sousa
- Score: 6–2, 6–1

Details
- Draw: 28
- Seeds: 8

Events
Singles	men	women
Doubles	men	women
← 2013 ·	Swedish Open	· 2015 →

Carlos Berlocq was the defending champion, but lost to João Sousa in the semifinals.
Pablo Cuevas won his first ATP World Tour title, defeating Sousa in the final, 6–2, 6–1.

== Seeds ==
The top four seeds receive a bye into the second round.

1. (Spain) David Ferrer (quarterfinals)
2. (Spain) Tommy Robredo (second round)
3. (Spain) Fernando Verdasco (semifinals)
4. (Poland) Jerzy Janowicz (second round, retired)
5. (Portugal) João Sousa (final)
6. (France) Jérémy Chardy (first round)
7. (Argentina) Carlos Berlocq (semifinals)
8. (Spain) Pablo Carreño Busta (quarterfinals)

== Draw ==
=== Key ===
- Q = Qualifier
- WC = Wild card
- LL = Lucky loser
- Alt = Alternate
- SE = Special exempt
- PR = Protected ranking
- ITF = ITF entry
- JE = Junior exempt
- w/o = Walkover
- r = Retired
- d = Defaulted
- SR = Special ranking

=== Finals ===
Semifinals
7	(Argentina) Carlos Berlocq	6	4	4
5	(Portugal) João Sousa	3	6	6
3	(Spain) Fernando Verdasco	6^{6}	3
PR	(Uruguay) Pablo Cuevas	7^{8}	6

Final
5	(Portugal) João Sousa	2	1
PR	(Uruguay) Pablo Cuevas	6	6

=== Top half ===
First round
(Spain) P Andújar	4	4
(Romania) V Hănescu	6	6
(France) K de Schepper	6^{4}	1
Q	(Moldova) R Albot	7^{7}	6
(Germany) J Reister	6	2	2
7	(Argentina) C Berlocq	2	6	6
(Spain) A Montañés	3	6	6^{4}
(Serbia) D Lajović	6	1	7^{7}
(Kazakhstan) M Kukushkin	3	5
WC	(Sweden) E Ymer	6	7
(Spain) P Riba	1^{r}
5	(Portugal) J Sousa	0

Second round
1	(Spain) D Ferrer	6	6
(Romania) V Hănescu	4	0
Q	(Moldova) R Albot	7	4	2
7	(Argentina) C Berlocq	5	6	6
4	(Poland) J Janowicz	3	1^{r}
(Serbia) D Lajović	6	1
WC	(Sweden) E Ymer	3	5
5	(Portugal) J Sousa	6	7

Quarterfinals
1	(Spain) D Ferrer	3	3
7	(Argentina) C Berlocq	6	6
(Serbia) D Lajović	4	4
5	(Portugal) J Sousa	6	6

Semifinals
7	(Argentina) C Berlocq	6	4	4
5	(Portugal) J Sousa	3	6	6

=== Bottom half ===
First round
8	(Spain) P Carreño Busta	6	6
(Germany) D Brown	3	4
WC	(Sweden) M Eriksson	2	1
(Italy) P Lorenzi	6	6
(Czech Republic) J Veselý	5	2
Q	(Spain) A Ramos Viñolas	7	6
6	(France) J Chardy	2	2
PR	(Uruguay) P Cuevas	6	6
Q	(Spain) I Cervantes	2	3
WC	(Sweden) C Lindell	6	6
(France) P-H Mathieu	2^{r}
Q	(Argentina) R Olivo	5

Second round
8	(Spain) P Carreño Busta	6	6
(Italy) P Lorenzi	2	2
Q	(Spain) A Ramos Viñolas	1	5
3	(Spain) F Verdasco	6	7
PR	(Uruguay) P Cuevas	4	6	7^{7}
WC	(Sweden) C Lindell	6	2	6^{2}
Q	(Argentina) R Olivo	7^{8}	6
2	(Spain) T Robredo	6^{6}	3

Quarterfinals
8	(Spain) P Carreño Busta	5	3
3	(Spain) F Verdasco	7	6
PR	(Uruguay) P Cuevas	6	6
Q	(Argentina) R Olivo	2	4

Semifinals
3	(Spain) F Verdasco	6^{6}	3
PR	(Uruguay) P Cuevas	7^{8}	6

== Qualifying ==
=== Seeds ===
1. (Spain) Albert Ramos (qualified)
2. (Moldova) Radu Albot (qualified)
3. (Brazil) André Ghem (qualifying competition)
4. (Estonia) Jürgen Zopp (qualifying competition)
5. (Argentina) Renzo Olivo (qualified)
6. (Spain) Juan Lizariturry (qualifying competition)
7. (Spain) Íñigo Cervantes (qualified)
8. (Chile) Christian Garín (qualifying competition)

=== Qualifiers ===
1. (Spain) Albert Ramos
2. (Moldova) Radu Albot
3. (Spain) Íñigo Cervantes
4. (Argentina) Renzo Olivo

=== Qualifying draw ===
==== First qualifier ====
First round
1	(Spain) Albert Ramos	6	6
WC	(Sweden) Mikael Ymer	1	0
(Spain) Carlos Gómez-Herrera	4	6	3
(Sweden) Daniel Windahl	6	2	6
(Norway) Joachim Bjerke	6	2	0
(Finland) Micke Kontinen	4	6	6
(Canada) Érik Chvojka	6	4	1
8	(Chile) Christian Garín	3	6	6

Second round
1	(Spain) Albert Ramos	4	6	6
(Sweden) Daniel Windahl	6	4	0
(Finland) Micke Kontinen	4	2
8	(Chile) Christian Garín	6	6

Qualifying competition
1	(Spain) Albert Ramos	6	6
8	(Chile) Christian Garín	3	4

==== Second qualifier ====
First round
2	(Moldova) Radu Albot	6	6
(Sweden) Filip Bergevi	1	1
WC	(Sweden) Igor Tubic	0	1
(United States) Nicholas Monroe	6	6
(Sweden) Isak Arvidsson	6^{3}	6	7
(United States) William Boe-Wiegaard	7^{7}	4	5
WC	(Sweden) Carl Söderlund	2	0
6	(Spain) Juan Lizariturry	6	6

Second round
2	(Moldova) Radu Albot	6	3	6
(United States) Nicholas Monroe	3	6	3
(Sweden) Isak Arvidsson	6^{2}	4
6	(Spain) Juan Lizariturry	7^{7}	6

Qualifying competition
2	(Moldova) Radu Albot	6	6
6	(Spain) Juan Lizariturry	1	2

==== Third qualifier ====
First round
3	(Brazil) André Ghem	4	6	6
(Germany) Florian Barth	6	3	2
WC	(Sweden) Gustav Hansson	3	4
(Austria) Gibril Diarra	6	6
(Finland) Henrik Sillanpää	6^{6}	7	6
(Sweden) Milos Sekulic	7^{8}	5	3
(Sweden) Lucas Renard	6	3	2
7	(Spain) Íñigo Cervantes	4	6	6

Second round
3	(Brazil) André Ghem	6	7^{7}
(Austria) Gibril Diarra	4	6^{2}
(Finland) Henrik Sillanpää	3	2
7	(Spain) Íñigo Cervantes	6	6

Qualifying competition
3	(Brazil) André Ghem	3	6	1
7	(Spain) Íñigo Cervantes	6	3	6

==== Fourth qualifier ====
First round
4	(Estonia) Jürgen Zopp	6	6
(Sweden) Morgan Johansson	3	1
(Sweden) Jonathan Mridha	1	3
(Sweden) Patrik Rosenholm	6	6
(Sweden) Robin Olin	2	6^{3}
(Sweden) Tobias Blomgren	6	7^{7}
(Australia) Andrew Whittington	4	4
5	(Argentina) Renzo Olivo	6	6

Second round
4	(Estonia) Jürgen Zopp	3	7	7^{7}
(Sweden) Patrik Rosenholm	6	5	6^{3}
(Sweden) Tobias Blomgren	5	4
5	(Argentina) Renzo Olivo	7	6

Qualifying competition
4	(Estonia) Jürgen Zopp	2	2
5	(Argentina) Renzo Olivo	6	6
