= 2016 Swedish Open – Men's doubles =

Men's doubles
- 2016 Swedish Open

Final
- Champions: (Spain) Marcel Granollers (Spain) David Marrero
- Runners-up: (New Zealand) Marcus Daniell (Brazil) Marcelo Demoliner
- Score: 6–2, 6–3

Events
Singles	men	women
Doubles	men	women
← 2015 ·	Swedish Open	· 2017 →

Jérémy Chardy and Łukasz Kubot were the defending champions, but they chose to compete in Hamburg instead.

Marcel Granollers and David Marrero won the title, defeating Marcus Daniell and Marcelo Demoliner in the final, 6–2, 6–3.

== Seeds ==
1. (Sweden) Robert Lindstedt / (Brazil) André Sá (first round, retired)
2. (Spain) Marcel Granollers / (Spain) David Marrero (champions)
3. (United States) Nicholas Monroe / (New Zealand) Artem Sitak (quarterfinals)
4. (New Zealand) Marcus Daniell / (Brazil) Marcelo Demoliner (final)

== Draw ==
=== Key ===
- Q = Qualifier
- WC = Wild card
- LL = Lucky loser
- Alt = Alternate
- SE = Special exempt
- PR = Protected ranking
- ITF = ITF entry
- JE = Junior exempt
- w/o = Walkover
- r = Retired
- d = Defaulted
- SR = Special ranking

=== Draw ===
First round
1	(Sweden) R Lindstedt (Brazil) A Sá	4	1^{r}
(Argentina) F Bagnis (United Kingdom) A Bedene	6	0
(Russia) K Khachanov (Spain) A Ramos-Viñolas	3	1
(Sweden) J Brunström (Sweden) A Siljeström	6	6
4	(New Zealand) M Daniell (Brazil) M Demoliner	6	6
(Portugal) G Elias (Portugal) J Sousa	1	4
Alt	(Spain) R Carballés Baena (Japan) T Daniel	2	4
WC	(Sweden) I Arvidsson (Sweden) F Simonsson	6	6
(Germany) D Brown (Australia) R Junaid	6	3	[10]
(Croatia) N Mektić (Croatia) A Šančić	3	6	[8]
(Russia) E Donskoy (Russia) M Elgin	5	1
3	(United States) N Monroe (New Zealand) A Sitak	7	6
WC	(Sweden) M Eriksson (Sweden) M Sekulic	3	3
(Chile) J Peralta (Argentina) H Zeballos	6	6
PR	(Germany) G Kretschmer (Germany) P Marx	3	4
2	(Spain) M Granollers (Spain) D Marrero	6	6

Quarterfinals
(Argentina) F Bagnis (United Kingdom) A Bedene	6	5	[10]
(Sweden) J Brunström (Sweden) A Siljeström	4	7	[8]
4	(New Zealand) M Daniell (Brazil) M Demoliner	3	6	[10]
WC	(Sweden) I Arvidsson (Sweden) F Simonsson	6	3	[5]
(Germany) D Brown (Australia) R Junaid	7^{7}	6
3	(United States) N Monroe (New Zealand) A Sitak	6^{4}	4
(Chile) J Peralta (Argentina) H Zeballos	4	3
2	(Spain) M Granollers (Spain) D Marrero	6	6

Semifinals
(Argentina) F Bagnis (United Kingdom) A Bedene	5	3
4	(New Zealand) M Daniell (Brazil) M Demoliner	7	6
(Germany) D Brown (Australia) R Junaid	6^{5}	4
2	(Spain) M Granollers (Spain) D Marrero	7^{7}	6

Final
4	(New Zealand) M Daniell (Brazil) M Demoliner	2	3
2	(Spain) M Granollers (Spain) D Marrero	6	6
