= 2018 Båstad Challenger – Singles =

Singles
- 2018 Båstad Challenger

Final
- Champion: (Spain) Pedro Martínez
- Runner-up: (France) Corentin Moutet
- Score: 7–6^{(7–5)}, 6–4

Events
Singles	Doubles
- Båstad Challenger

Dušan Lajović was the defending champion but chose not to defend his title.

Pedro Martínez won the title after defeating Corentin Moutet 7–6^{(7–5)}, 6–4 in the final.

== Seeds ==
1. (Argentina) Guido Andreozzi (second round)
2. (Sweden) Elias Ymer (first round)
3. (France) Corentin Moutet (final)
4. (Brazil) Thiago Monteiro (second round)
5. (Switzerland) Henri Laaksonen (first round)
6. (France) Calvin Hemery (second round)
7. (Canada) Félix Auger-Aliassime (first round, retired)
8. (Germany) Oscar Otte (first round)

== Draw ==
Key

- Q = Qualifier
- WC = Wild card
- LL = Lucky loser
- Alt = Alternate
- ITF = ITF entry
- PR = Protected ranking
- SR = Special ranking
- SE = Special exempt
- JE = Junior exempt
- JR = Junior Accelerator Programme entrant
- CO = College Accelerator Programme entrant
- NG = Next Gen Accelerator Program entrant
- w/o = Walkover
- r = Retired
- d = Defaulted

=== Finals ===
Semifinals
Q	(Slovakia) Filip Horanský	4	6	3
3	(France) Corentin Moutet	6	4	6
(Spain) Pedro Martínez	6	6
WC	(Sweden) Mikael Ymer	3	4

Final
3	(France) Corentin Moutet	6^{5}	4
(Spain) Pedro Martínez	7^{7}	6

=== Top half ===
First round
1	(Argentina) G Andreozzi	2	6	6
(Argentina) A Collarini	6	4	2
(Czech Republic) L Rosol	6	6
(France) J Tatlot	3	2
Q	(Slovakia) F Horanský	6	0
(India) S Nagal	2	0^{r}
(South Africa) L Harris	6	6
5	(Switzerland) H Laaksonen	4	4
3	(France) C Moutet	6	6
(China) Ze Zhang	2	4
(Portugal) G Oliveira	6	7
WC	(Sweden) J Mridha	4	5
(Belarus) U Ignatik	7^{9}	4
Q	(France) Jules Okala	6^{7}	0^{r}
(France) C Lestienne	6	3
7	(Canada) F Auger-Aliassime	4	2^{r}

Second round
1	(Argentina) G Andreozzi	4	7	6^{4}
(Czech Republic) L Rosol	6	5	7^{7}
Q	(Slovakia) F Horanský	7^{8}	6
(South Africa) L Harris	6^{6}	4
3	(France) C Moutet	6	3	6
(Portugal) G Oliveira	4	6	2
(Belarus) U Ignatik	1	4
(France) C Lestienne	6	6

Quarterfinals
(Czech Republic) L Rosol	3	1
Q	(Slovakia) F Horanský	6	6
3	(France) C Moutet	7	6
(France) C Lestienne	5	3

Semifinals
Q	(Slovakia) F Horanský	4	6	3
3	(France) C Moutet	6	4	6

=== Bottom half ===
First round
8	(Germany) O Otte	2	4
Q	(China) D Wu	6	6
(Czech Republic) V Šafránek	6	0	7
WC	(Sweden) F Bergevi	3	6	5
(Spain) P Martínez	6	6
Q	(France) G Blancaneaux	4	1
LL	(Slovakia) L Klein	4	6^{4}
4	(Brazil) T Monteiro	6	7^{7}
6	(France) C Hemery	6	6
WC	(Sweden) M Eriksson	4	1
(Czech Republic) Z Kolář	3	6	0
WC	(Sweden) M Ymer	6	1	6
(Russia) I Nedelko	3	0
(Argentina) C Berlocq	6	6
(Argentina) JI Londero	6	6
2	(Sweden) E Ymer	1	4

Second round
Q	(China) D Wu	6	4	2
(Czech Republic) V Šafránek	1	6	6
(Spain) P Martínez	6	6
4	(Brazil) T Monteiro	4	4
6	(France) C Hemery	4	6	2
WC	(Sweden) M Ymer	6	3	6
(Argentina) C Berlocq	3	7^{7}	6
(Argentina) JI Londero	6	6^{1}	4

Quarterfinals
(Czech Republic) V Šafránek	5	2
(Spain) P Martínez	7	6
WC	(Sweden) M Ymer	6	4	7
(Argentina) C Berlocq	1	6	5

Semifinals
(Spain) P Martínez	6	6
WC	(Sweden) M Ymer	3	4
