= 2014 Swedish Open =

- Date: 7–13 July (men); 14–20 July (women)
- Edition: 67th (men); 6th (women)
- Surface: Clay / outdoor
- Location: Båstad, Sweden

Champions

Men's singles
- (Uruguay) Pablo Cuevas

Women's singles
- (Germany) Mona Barthel

Men's doubles
- (Sweden) Johan Brunström / (United States) Nicholas Monroe

Women's doubles
- (Slovenia) Andreja Klepač / (Spain) María Teresa Torró Flor
← 2013 ·	Swedish Open	· 2015 →

The 2014 Swedish Open was a tennis tournament played on outdoor clay courts as part of the ATP World Tour 250 Series of the 2014 ATP World Tour and as part of the International Series on the 2014 WTA Tour. It took place in Båstad, Sweden, from 7 through 13 July 2014 for the men's tournament, and from 14 through 20 July 2014 for the women's tournament. It was also known as the 2014 SkiStar Swedish Open for the men and the 2014 Collector Swedish Open for the women for sponsorship reasons. It was the 67th edition of the event for the men and the 6th edition for the women.

== Finals ==
=== Men's singles ===
- (Uruguay) Pablo Cuevas defeated (Portugal) João Sousa, 6–2, 6–1

=== Women's singles ===
- (Germany) Mona Barthel defeated (South Africa) Chanelle Scheepers, 6–3, 7–6^{(7–3)}

=== Men's doubles ===
- (Sweden) Johan Brunström / (United States) Nicholas Monroe defeated (France) Jérémy Chardy / (Austria) Oliver Marach, 4–6, 7–6^{(7–5)}, [10–7]

=== Women's doubles ===
- (Slovenia) Andreja Klepač / (Spain) María Teresa Torró Flor defeated (United Kingdom) Jocelyn Rae / (United Kingdom) Anna Smith, 6–1, 6–1

== Points and prize money ==
=== Point distribution ===
Event	W	F	SF	QF	Round of 16	Round of 32	Q	Q3	Q2
Men's singles	250	150	90	45	20	0	12	6	0
Men's doubles	250	150	90	45	0	—	—	—	—
Women's singles	280	180	110	60	30	1	18	12	1
Women's doubles	280	180	110	60	1	—	—	—	—

=== Prize money ===
Event	W	F	SF	QF	Round of 16	Round of 32	Q3	Q2
Men's singles	€77,315	€40,720	€22,060	€12,565	€7,405	€4,385	€710	€340
Women's singles	$43,000	$21,400	$11,500	$6,175	$3,400	$2,100	$1,020	$600
Men's doubles	€23,500	€12,350	€6,690	€3,830	€2,240	—	—	—
Women's doubles	$12,300	$6,400	$3,435	$1,820	$960	—	—	—

== ATP singles main-draw entrants ==
=== Seeds ===
Country	Player	Rank^{1}	Seed
ESP	David Ferrer	7	1
ESP	Tommy Robredo	22	2
ESP	Fernando Verdasco	24	3
POL	Jerzy Janowicz	25	4
POR	João Sousa	41	5
FRA	Jérémy Chardy	42	6
ARG	Carlos Berlocq	43	7
ESP	Pablo Carreño Busta	60	8

- ^{1} Rankings are as of June 23, 2014

=== Other entrants ===
The following players received wildcards into the singles main draw:

- (Sweden) Markus Eriksson
- (Sweden) Christian Lindell
- (Sweden) Elias Ymer

The following players received entry from the qualifying draw:

- (Moldova) Radu Albot
- (Spain) Iñigo Cervantes
- (Argentina) Renzo Olivo
- (Spain) Albert Ramos Viñolas

=== Withdrawals ===
Before the tournament

- (Spain) Nicolás Almagro
- (Poland) Łukasz Kubot

=== Retirements ===
- (Poland) Jerzy Janowicz
- (France) Paul-Henri Mathieu (illness)
- (Spain) Pere Riba (neck injury)

== ATP doubles main-draw entrants ==
=== Seeds ===
Country	Player	Country	Player	Rank^{1}	Seed
ESP	David Marrero	ESP	Fernando Verdasco	26	1
GER	Andre Begemann	SWE	Robert Lindstedt	61	2
POL	Tomasz Bednarek	FIN	Henri Kontinen	125	3
SWE	Johan Brunström	USA	Nicholas Monroe	130	4

- Rankings are as of June 23, 2014

=== Other entrants ===
The following pairs received wildcards into the doubles main draw:

- (Sweden) Isak Arvidsson / (Sweden) Markus Eriksson
- (Sweden) Daniel Windahl / (Sweden) Elias Ymer

The following pair received entry as alternates:

- (Germany) Dustin Brown / (Serbia) Dušan Lajović

=== Withdrawals ===
Before the tournament

- (Spain) Pere Riba (neck injury)

== WTA singles main-draw entrants ==
=== Seeds ===
Country	Player	Rank^{1}	Seed
FRA	Alizé Cornet	21	1
RUS	Anastasia Pavlyuchenkova	23	2
ITA	Camila Giorgi	40	3
KAZ	Yaroslava Shvedova	52	4
SVK	Anna Schmiedlová	57	5
GER	Annika Beck	59	6
ESP	María Teresa Torró Flor	60	7
SLO	Polona Hercog	61	8

- ^{1} Rankings are as of July 7, 2014

=== Other entrants ===
The following players received wildcards into the singles main draw:

- (Sweden) Sofia Arvidsson
- (France) Alizé Cornet
- (Sweden) Rebecca Peterson

The following players received entry from the qualifying draw:

- (Canada) Gabriela Dabrowski
- (Netherlands) Richèl Hogenkamp
- (Estonia) Anett Kontaveit
- (Czech Republic) Tereza Martincová
- (Kazakhstan) Yulia Putintseva
- (Germany) Laura Siegemund

=== Withdrawals ===
Before the tournament

- (United States) Vania King
- (Austria) Yvonne Meusburger
- (Argentina) Paula Ormaechea
- (Italy) Flavia Pennetta
- (Spain) Carla Suárez Navarro
- (United States) Serena Williams
- (Czech Republic) Barbora Záhlavová-Strýcová

=== Retirements ===
- (Romania) Irina-Camelia Begu (right thigh injury)
- (Brazil) Teliana Pereira (right knee injury)

== WTA doubles main-draw entrants ==
=== Seeds ===
Country	Player	Country	Player	Rank^{1}	Seed
GER	Julia Görges	POL	Katarzyna Piter	94	1
CAN	Gabriela Dabrowski	POL	Alicja Rosolska	131	2
ESP	Lara Arruabarrena	ESP	Sílvia Soler Espinosa	161	3
RUS	Alexandra Panova	FRA	Laura Thorpe	181	4

- ^{1} Rankings are as of July 7, 2014

=== Other entrants ===
The following pairs received wildcards into the doubles main draw:

- (Sweden) Sofia Arvidsson / (Sweden) Hilda Melander
- (Sweden) Johanna Larsson / (Sweden) Rebecca Peterson

=== Withdrawals ===
During the tournament

- (Brazil) Teliana Pereira (right knee injury)
