= 2014 Swedish Open – Men's doubles =

Men's doubles
- 2014 Swedish Open

Final
- Champions: (Sweden) Johan Brunström (United States) Nicholas Monroe
- Runners-up: (France) Jérémy Chardy (Austria) Oliver Marach
- Score: 4–6, 7–6^{(7–5)}, [10–7]

Details
- Draw: 16
- Seeds: 4

Events
Singles	men	women
Doubles	men	women
- Swedish Open

Nicholas Monroe and Simon Stadler were the defending champions, but Stadler chose not to participate.
Monroe played alongside Johan Brunström and successfully defended the title, defeating Jérémy Chardy and Oliver Marach in the final, 4–6, 7–6^{(7–5)}, [10–7].

== Seeds ==
1. (Spain) David Marrero / (Spain) Fernando Verdasco (semifinals)
2. (Germany) Andre Begemann / (Sweden) Robert Lindstedt (quarterfinals)
3. (Poland) Tomasz Bednarek / (Finland) Henri Kontinen (semifinals)
4. (Sweden) Johan Brunström / (United States) Nicholas Monroe (champions)

== Draw ==
Key

- Q = Qualifier
- WC = Wild card
- LL = Lucky loser
- Alt = Alternate
- ITF = ITF entry
- PR = Protected ranking
- SR = Special ranking
- SE = Special exempt
- JE = Junior exempt
- JR = Junior Accelerator Programme entrant
- CO = College Accelerator Programme entrant
- NG = Next Gen Accelerator Program entrant
- w/o = Walkover
- r = Retired
- d = Defaulted

=== Draw ===
First round
1	(Spain) D Marrero (Spain) F Verdasco	6^{5}	6	[12]
(Australia) R Junaid (Germany) C Kas	7^{7}	2	[10]
Alt	(Germany) D Brown (Serbia) D Lajović	3	7^{7}	[10]
(Sweden) A Siljeström (Slovakia) I Zelenay	6	6^{4}	[6]
4	(Sweden) J Brunström (United States) N Monroe	7^{7}	6
(Republic of Ireland) J Cluskey (Kazakhstan) M Kukushkin	6^{5}	4
WC	(Sweden) D Windahl (Sweden) E Ymer	6	0	[10]
(Germany) G Kretschmer (Germany) A Satschko	3	6	[12]
WC	(Sweden) I Arvidsson (Sweden) M Eriksson	1	7^{7}	[10]
(Czech Republic) L Dlouhý (Czech Republic) J Veselý	6	6^{5}	[7]
(Argentina) C Berlocq (Uruguay) P Cuevas	3	6	[2]
3	(Poland) T Bednarek (Finland) H Kontinen	6	3	[10]
(Spain) P Andújar (Spain) P Carreño Busta	6^{5}	4
(France) J Chardy (Austria) O Marach	7^{7}	6
(Australia) P Hanley (United Kingdom) J Marray	6	4	[9]
2	(Germany) A Begemann (Sweden) R Lindstedt	2	6	[11]

Quarterfinals
1	(Spain) D Marrero (Spain) F Verdasco	6	6
Alt	(Germany) D Brown (Serbia) D Lajović	3	1
4	(Sweden) J Brunström (United States) N Monroe	6	6^{5}	[10]
(Germany) G Kretschmer (Germany) A Satschko	3	7^{7}	[3]
WC	(Sweden) I Arvidsson (Sweden) M Eriksson	3	2
3	(Poland) T Bednarek (Finland) H Kontinen	6	6
(France) J Chardy (Austria) O Marach	7^{7}	6
2	(Germany) A Begemann (Sweden) R Lindstedt	6^{1}	2

Semifinals
1	(Spain) D Marrero (Spain) F Verdasco	3	4
4	(Sweden) J Brunström (United States) N Monroe	6	6
3	(Poland) T Bednarek (Finland) H Kontinen	5	6	[9]
(France) J Chardy (Austria) O Marach	7	3	[11]

Final
4	(Sweden) J Brunström (United States) N Monroe	4	7^{7}	[10]
(France) J Chardy (Austria) O Marach	6	6^{5}	[7]
