= 2016 Båstad Challenger =

- Date: 4–10 July
- Edition: 1st
- Draw: 32S / 16D
- Prize money: €42,500+H
- Surface: Clay / Outdoors
- Location: Båstad, Sweden

Champions

Singles
- (Argentina) Horacio Zeballos

Doubles
- (Sweden) Isak Arvidsson / (Sweden) Fred Simonsson
- Båstad Challenger

The 2016 Båstad Challenger is a professional tennis tournament played on clay courts. It was the first edition of the tournament which is part of the 2016 ATP Challenger Tour. It took place in Båstad, Sweden between 4 and 10 July 2016.

== Singles main-draw entrants ==
=== Seeds ===
Country	Player	Rank^{1}	Seed
RUS	Evgeny Donskoy	78	1
ARG	Horacio Zeballos	83	2
ARG	Carlos Berlocq	95	3
ITA	Thomas Fabbiano	113	4
ESP	Roberto Carballés Baena	115	5
ESP	Albert Montañés	120	6
ESP	Daniel Muñoz de la Nava	135	7
ARG	Nicolás Kicker	136	8

- ^{1} Rankings are as of June 27, 2016.

=== Other entrants ===
The following players received wildcards into the singles main draw:

- (Sweden) Isak Arvidsson
- (Sweden) Markus Eriksson
- (Sweden) Christian Lindell
- (Sweden) Carl Söderlund

The following players received entry from the qualifying draw:

- (Belarus) Maxim Dubarenco
- (Netherlands) Scott Griekspoor
- (India) Prajnesh Gunneswaran
- (China) Zhang Ze

The following player entered as a lucky loser:

- (Poland) Hubert Hurkacz

== Champions ==
=== Singles ===
- (Argentina) Horacio Zeballos def. (Spain) Roberto Carballés Baena, 6–3, 6–4

=== Doubles ===
- (Sweden) Isak Arvidsson / (Sweden) Fred Simonsson def. (Sweden) Johan Brunström / (Sweden) Andreas Siljeström, 6–3, 7–5
