= 2013 Davis Cup Europe/Africa Zone Group I =

International tennis competition

The Europe and Africa Zone is one of the three zones of the regional Davis Cup competition in 2013.

In the Europe and Africa Zone there are four different groups in which teams compete against each other to advance to the next group. Winners in Group I advance to the World Group play-offs, along with losing teams from the World Group first round. Teams who lose their respective ties will compete in the relegation play-offs, with winning teams remaining in Group I, whereas teams who lose their play-offs will be relegated to the Europe/Africa Group II in 2014.

Great Britain, Netherlands, Poland and Ukraine won their second-round ties, and competed in the World Group play-offs in mid-September.

South Africa and Denmark were defeated in the play-offs and were relegated to play the Europe/Africa Zone Group II in 2014.

== Participating teams ==
Seeds:

1. Russia
2. Sweden
3. South Africa
4. Netherlands

Remaining nations:

- Denmark
- Great Britain
- Poland
- Romania
- Slovakia
- Slovenia
- Ukraine

=== Draw ===
All seeded teams get a bye into the second round, as well as Great Britain who were second round losers in the 2012 Davis Cup

Second Round Play-offs
Moscow, Russia (indoor hard)
1	Russia	5
3	South Africa	0
Helsingborg, Sweden (indoor hard)
Denmark	2
2	Sweden	3

First Round Play-offs
1	Russia
bye
Ljubljana, Slovenia (clay)
3	South Africa	1
Slovenia	4
Denmark
bye
Bratislava, Slovakia (indoor hard)
Slovakia	3
2	Sweden	2

First Round
1	Russia
bye
Great Britain
bye
3	South Africa
bye
Wrocław, Poland (indoor hard)
Poland	3
Slovenia	2
Cluj-Napoca, Romania (indoor hard)
Denmark	0
Romania	5
4	Netherlands
bye
Kremenchuk, Ukraine (indoor hard)
Ukraine	3
Slovakia	2
bye
2	Sweden

Second Round
Coventry, Great Britain (indoor hard)
1	Russia	2
Great Britain	3
Zielona Góra, Poland (indoor hard)
3	South Africa	1
Poland	3
Brasov, Romania (indoor hard)
Romania	0
4	Netherlands	5
Dnipropetrovsk, Ukraine (indoor hard)
Ukraine	3
2	Sweden	2

- South Africa and Denmark relegated to Group II in 2014.
- Great Britain, Poland, Netherlands, and Ukraine advance to World Group Play-off.

== First round ==
=== Poland vs. Slovenia ===
Poland
3
Centennial Hall, Wrocław, Poland
1–3 February 2013
Hard (indoor)

Slovenia
2

			1	2	3	4	5
1	(Poland) (Slovenia)	Jerzy Janowicz; Blaž Kavčič	6; 3	6; 3	7; 5
2	(Poland) (Slovenia)	Łukasz Kubot; Grega Žemlja	6; 3	6; 2	6; 0
3	(Poland) (Slovenia)	Mariusz Fyrstenberg / Marcin Matkowski; Blaž Kavčič / Grega Žemlja	3; 6	6; 2	2; 6	6; 4	11; 13
4	(Poland) (Slovenia)	Jerzy Janowicz; Grega Žemlja	7^{7} 6^{4}	6; 3	6; 3
5	(Poland) (Slovenia)	Mariusz Fyrstenberg; Tomislav Ternar	6; 4	5; 7	5; 7

=== Romania vs. Denmark ===
Romania
5
Sala Sporturilor "Horia Demian", Cluj Napoca, Romania
1–3 February 2013
Hard (indoor)

Denmark
0

			1	2	3	4	5
1	(Romania) (Denmark)	Marius Copil; Frederik Nielsen	6; 3	7^{9} 6^{7}	6; 4
2	(Romania) (Denmark)	Adrian Ungur; Martin Pedersen	6; 2	7^{7} 6^{3}	4; 6	4; 6	6; 2
3	(Romania) (Denmark)	Florin Mergea / Horia Tecău; Frederik Nielsen / Thomas Kromann	7^{7} 6^{3}	6; 2	6; 4
4	(Romania) (Denmark)	Adrian Ungur; Thomas Kromann	6; 3	6; 4
5	(Romania) (Denmark)	Marius Copil; Christoffer Kønigsfeldt	6; 4	6; 3

=== Ukraine vs. Slovakia ===
Ukraine
3
TC Premier, Kremenchuk, Ukraine
1–3 February 2013
Hard (indoor)

Slovakia
2

			1	2	3	4	5
1	(Ukraine) (Slovakia)	Alexandr Dolgopolov; Andrej Martin	6; 2	6; 2	7; 5
2	(Ukraine) (Slovakia)	Serhiy Stakhovsky; Lukáš Lacko	2; 6	7; 5	6^{5} 7^{7}	4; 6
3	(Ukraine) (Slovakia)	Alexandr Dolgopolov / Serhiy Stakhovsky; Filip Polášek / Igor Zelenay	6^{4} 7^{7}	6^{3} 7^{7}	3; 6
4	(Ukraine) (Slovakia)	Alexandr Dolgopolov; Lukáš Lacko	3; 6	6; 3	6; 2	6; 1
5	(Ukraine) (Slovakia)	Illya Marchenko; Andrej Martin	7; 5	7^{7} 6^{5}	6; 4

== Second round ==
=== Great Britain vs. Russia ===
Great Britain
3
Ricoh Arena, Coventry, Great Britain
5–7 April 2013
Hard (indoor)

Russia
2

			1	2	3	4	5
1	(United Kingdom) (Russia)	Daniel Evans; Dmitry Tursunov	4; 6	7^{7} 6^{5}	4; 6	7; 5	4; 6
2	(United Kingdom) (Russia)	James Ward; Evgeny Donskoy	6; 4	6; 4	5; 7	3; 6	6; 8
3	(United Kingdom) (Russia)	Colin Fleming / Jonathan Marray; Victor Baluda / Igor Kunitsyn	6; 1	6; 4	6; 2
4	(United Kingdom) (Russia)	James Ward; Dmitry Tursunov	6; 4	5; 7	5; 7	6; 4	6; 4
5	(United Kingdom) (Russia)	Daniel Evans; Evgeny Donskoy	6; 4	6; 4	6; 1

- It was the first time since 1930 that Great Britain had won after being 2-0 down.

=== Poland vs. South Africa ===
Poland
3
Recreation and Sports Center, Zielona Góra, Poland
5–7 April 2013
Hard (indoor)

South Africa
1

			1	2	3	4	5
1	(Poland) (South Africa)	Jerzy Janowicz; Jean Andersen	6; 4	6; 3	6; 3
2	(Poland) (South Africa)	Łukasz Kubot; Rik de Voest	3; 6	7^{7} 6^{4}	5; 7	4; 6
3	(Poland) (South Africa)	Mariusz Fyrstenberg / Marcin Matkowski; Rik de Voest / Jean Andersen	7; 5	7^{7} 6^{2}	7; 5
4	(Poland) (South Africa)	Jerzy Janowicz; Ruan Roelofse	4; 6	6; 3	6; 1	6; 1
5	(Poland) (South Africa)	Łukasz Kubot; Jean Andersen						not played

=== Romania vs. Netherlands ===
Romania
0
Dumitru Popescu Colibași Sports Hall, Brasov, Romania
5–7 April 2013
Hard (indoor)

Netherlands
5

			1	2	3	4	5
1	(Romania) (Netherlands)	Adrian Ungur; Robin Haase	4; 6	4; 6	6; 3	3; 6
2	(Romania) (Netherlands)	Victor Hănescu; Igor Sijsling	4; 6	6^{5} 7^{7}	6; 2	7^{7} 6^{5}	2; 6
3	(Romania) (Netherlands)	Marius Copil / Victor Hănescu; Thiemo de Bakker / Robin Haase	4; 6	5; 7	4; 6
4	(Romania) (Netherlands)	Marius Copil; Thiemo de Bakker	6^{3} 7^{7}	6^{2} 7^{7}
5	(Romania) (Netherlands)	Adrian Ungur; Igor Sijsling	6; 1	3; 6	4; 6

=== Ukraine vs. Sweden ===
Ukraine
3
Megaron Tennis Club, Dnipropetrovsk, Ukraine
5–7 April 2013
Hard (indoor)

Sweden
2

			1	2	3	4	5
1	(Ukraine) (Sweden)	Alexandr Dolgopolov; Isak Arvidsson	6; 2	6; 0	7^{7} 6^{5}
2	(Ukraine) (Sweden)	Denys Molchanov; Markus Eriksson	5; 7	6; 4	4; 6	4; 6
3	(Ukraine) (Sweden)	Denys Molchanov / Serhiy Stakhovsky; Johan Brunström / Robert Lindstedt	4; 6	3; 6	6; 3	7^{7} 6^{3}	4; 6
4	(Ukraine) (Sweden)	Alexandr Dolgopolov; Markus Eriksson	3; 6	6; 1	6; 4	6; 3
5	(Ukraine) (Sweden)	Serhiy Stakhovsky; Isak Arvidsson	6; 2	6; 3	7; 5

== First round play-offs ==
=== Slovenia vs. South Africa ===
Slovenia
4
Park Tivoli, Ljubljana, Slovenia
13–15 September 2013
Clay

South Africa
1

			1	2	3	4	5
1	(Slovenia) (South Africa)	Blaž Rola; Rik de Voest	6; 1	6; 4	6; 4
2	(Slovenia) (South Africa)	Blaž Kavčič; Ruan Roelofse	6; 1	6; 3	6; 4
3	(Slovenia) (South Africa)	Blaž Kavčič / Blaž Rola; Raven Klaasen / Nikala Scholtz	7; 5	6; 1	7^{7} 6^{4}
4	(Slovenia) (South Africa)	Janez Semrajc; Rik de Voest	6; 2	6; 4
5	(Slovenia) (South Africa)	Blaž Rola; Nikala Scholtz	3; 2					retired

=== Slovakia vs. Sweden ===
Slovakia
3
Aegon Arena, Bratislava, Slovakia
13–15 September 2013
Hard (indoor)

Sweden
2

			1	2	3	4	5
1	(Slovakia) (Sweden)	Andrej Martin; Isak Arvidsson	6; 2	6; 3	6; 4
2	(Slovakia) (Sweden)	Lukáš Lacko; Markus Eriksson	6; 2	6; 3	6; 4
3	(Slovakia) (Sweden)	Lukáš Lacko / Filip Polášek; Johan Brunström / Robert Lindstedt	4; 6	5; 7	4; 6
4	(Slovakia) (Sweden)	Andrej Martin; Markus Eriksson	7^{7} 6^{3}	2; 6	5; 7	4; 6
5	(Slovakia) (Sweden)	Lukáš Lacko; Isak Arvidsson	6; 2	6; 3	6; 3

== Second round play-offs ==
=== Russia vs. South Africa ===
Russia
5
Olympic Stadium, Moscow, Russia
25–27 October 2013
Hard (indoor)

South Africa
0

			1	2	3	4	5
1	(Russia) (South Africa)	Karen Khachanov; Dean O'Brien	7; 5	6; 1	6; 3
2	(Russia) (South Africa)	Alex Bogomolov, Jr. Jacob Coenraad de Klerk	6^{3} 7^{7}	6; 0	6; 4	6; 1
3	(Russia) (South Africa)	Konstantin Kravchuk / Andrey Kuznetsov; Raven Klaasen / Tucker Vorster	2; 6	6; 3	7^{7} 6^{4}	6; 2
4	(Russia) (South Africa)	Andrey Kuznetsov; Dean O'Brien	6; 2	6; 3
5	(Russia) (South Africa)	Konstantin Kravchuk; Jacob Coenraad de Klerk	4; 1					retired

=== Sweden vs. Denmark ===
Sweden
3
Idrottens Hus, Helsingborg, Sweden
25–27 October 2013
Hard (indoor)

Denmark
2

			1	2	3	4	5
1	(Sweden) (Denmark)	Elias Ymer; Frederik Nielsen	6^{6} 7^{8}	2; 6	6; 4	5; 7
2	(Sweden) (Denmark)	Markus Eriksson; Martin Pedersen	7^{9} 6^{7}	3; 6	6^{3} 7^{7}	4; 6
3	(Sweden) (Denmark)	Johan Brunström / Robert Lindstedt; Thomas Kromann / Frederik Nielsen	6^{5} 7^{7}	6; 4	6; 3	6; 3
4	(Sweden) (Denmark)	Markus Eriksson; Frederik Nielsen	6; 3	3; 6	6^{1} 7^{7}	6; 4	9; 7
5	(Sweden) (Denmark)	Elias Ymer; Martin Pedersen	7^{7} 6^{3}	7^{10} 6^{8}	4; 6	7; 5
