= 2016 Swedish Open =

2016 edition of the Swedish Open tennis tournament

- Date: 11–17 July (men); 18–24 July (women)
- Edition: 69th (men); 8th (women)
- Surface: Clay / outdoor
- Location: Båstad, Sweden
- Venue: Båstad Tennis Stadium

Champions

Men's singles
- (Spain) Albert Ramos Viñolas

Women's singles
- (Germany) Laura Siegemund

Men's doubles
- (Spain) Marcel Granollers / (Spain) David Marrero

Women's doubles
- (Romania) Andreea Mitu / (Poland) Alicja Rosolska
- Swedish Open

The 2016 Swedish Open was a tennis tournament played on outdoor clay courts as part of the ATP World Tour 250 Series of the 2016 ATP World Tour and as part of the International Series on the 2016 WTA Tour. It took place in Båstad, Sweden, from 11 through 17 July 2016 for the men's tournament, and from 18 through 24 July 2016 for the women's tournament. It was also known as the 2016 SkiStar Swedish Open for the men and the 2016 Ericsson Open for the women for sponsorship reasons. It was the 69th edition of the event for the men and the 8th edition for the women.

== Finals ==
=== Men's singles ===
- (Spain) Albert Ramos Viñolas defeated (Spain) Fernando Verdasco, 6–3, 6–4

=== Women's singles ===
- (Germany) Laura Siegemund defeated (Czech Republic) Kateřina Siniaková, 7–5, 6–1

=== Men's doubles ===
- (Spain) Marcel Granollers / (Spain) David Marrero defeated (New Zealand) Marcus Daniell / (Brazil) Marcelo Demoliner, 6–2, 6–3

=== Women's doubles ===
- (Romania) Andreea Mitu / (Poland) Alicja Rosolska defeated (Netherlands) Lesley Kerkhove / (Belarus) Lidziya Marozava, 6–3, 7–5

== Points and prize money ==
=== Point distribution ===
Event	W	F	SF	QF	Round of 16	Round of 32	Q	Q2	Q1
Men's singles	250	150	90	45	20	0	12	6	0
Men's doubles	250	150	90	45	0	—N/a	—N/a	—N/a	—N/a
Women's singles	280	180	110	60	30	1	18	12	1
Women's doubles	280	180	110	60	1	—N/a	—N/a	—N/a	—N/a

=== Prize money ===
Event	W	F	SF	QF	Round of 16	Round of 32^{1}	Q2	Q1
Men's singles	€82,450	€43,430	€23,525	€13,400	€7,900	€4,680	€2,105	€1,055
Men's doubles *	€25,070	€13,170	€7,140	€4,080	€2,390	—N/a	—N/a	—N/a
Women's singles	$43,000	$21,400	$11,500	$6,175	$3,400	$2,100	$1,020	$600
Women's doubles *	$12,300	$6,400	$3,435	$1,820	$960	—N/a	—N/a	—N/a

_{^{1} Qualifiers prize money is also the Round of 32 prize money}
_{* per team}

== ATP singles main-draw entrants ==
=== Seeds ===
Country	Player	Rank^{1}	Seed
ESP	David Ferrer	14	1
POR	João Sousa	31	2
ESP	Albert Ramos Viñolas	36	3
ESP	Marcel Granollers	43	4
ESP	Fernando Verdasco	53	5
GBR	Aljaž Bedene	56	6
~~ARG~~	~~Diego Schwartzman~~	~~71~~	~~7~~
RUS	Evgeny Donskoy	78	8
ARG	Horacio Zeballos	83	9

- ^{1} Rankings are as of June 27, 2016

=== Other entrants ===
The following players received wildcards into the singles main draw:

- (Sweden) Isak Arvidsson
- (Sweden) Fred Simonsson
- (Sweden) Carl Söderlund

The following players received entry from the qualifying draw:

- (France) Calvin Hemery
- (Switzerland) Henri Laaksonen
- (France) Tristan Lamasine
- (Sweden) Christian Lindell

=== Withdrawals ===
Before the tournament

- (Brazil) Rogério Dutra Silva →replaced by (Germany) Michael Berrer
- (Russia) Teymuraz Gabashvili →replaced by (Spain) Roberto Carballés Baena
- (Serbia) Filip Krajinović →replaced by (Germany) Dustin Brown
- (Italy) Paolo Lorenzi →replaced by (Sweden) Elias Ymer
- (Argentina) Diego Schwartzman →replaced by (Argentina) Marco Trungelliti

== ATP doubles main-draw entrants ==
=== Seeds ===
Country	Player	Country	Player	Rank^{1}	Seed
SWE	Robert Lindstedt	BRA	André Sá	82	1
ESP	Marcel Granollers	ESP	David Marrero	98	2
USA	Nicholas Monroe	NZL	Artem Sitak	107	3
NZL	Marcus Daniell	BRA	Marcelo Demoliner	135	4

- Rankings are as of June 27, 2016

=== Other entrants ===
The following pairs received wildcards into the doubles main draw:

- (Sweden) Isak Arvidsson / (Sweden) Fred Simonsson
- (Sweden) Markus Eriksson / (Sweden) Milos Sekulic

The following pair received entry as alternates:

- (Spain) Roberto Carballés Baena / (Japan) Taro Daniel

=== Withdrawals ===
Before the tournament

- (Argentina) Diego Schwartzman

== WTA singles main-draw entrants ==
=== Seeds ===
Country	Player	Rank^{1}	Seed
GER	Angelique Kerber	2	1
ITA	Sara Errani	21	2
NED	Kiki Bertens	26	3
GER	Annika Beck	38	4
SVK	Anna Karolína Schmiedlová	41	5
GER	Laura Siegemund	43	6
KAZ	Yaroslava Shvedova	49	7
SWE	Johanna Larsson	55	8

- ^{1} Rankings are as of July 11, 2016

=== Other entrants ===
The following players received wildcards into the singles main draw:

- (Sweden) Susanne Celik
- (Russia) Elizaveta Kulichkova
- (Sweden) Cornelia Lister
- (Sweden) Rebecca Peterson

The following players received entry from the qualifying draw:

- (Slovakia) Jana Čepelová
- (Czech Republic) Lucie Hradecká
- (Ukraine) Kateryna Kozlova
- (Serbia) Aleksandra Krunić
- (Czech Republic) Kateřina Siniaková
- (Spain) Sara Sorribes Tormo

The following player received entry as a special exempt:

- (Switzerland) Viktorija Golubic

=== Withdrawals ===
Before the tournament

- (Germany) Anna-Lena Friedsam → replaced by (Estonia) Anett Kontaveit
- (France) Caroline Garcia → replaced by (Romania) Sorana Cîrstea
- (France) Pauline Parmentier → replaced by (Belarus) Aliaksandra Sasnovich

During the tournament

- (Germany) Angelique Kerber (Left elbow injury)

=== Retirements ===
- (Germany) Julia Görges (Left hip injury)
- (Kazakhstan) Yaroslava Shvedova (Mid-back injury)

== WTA doubles main-draw entrants ==
=== Seeds ===
Country	Player	Country	Player	Rank^{1}	Seed
~~GEO~~	~~Oksana Kalashnikova~~	~~KAZ~~	~~Yaroslava Shvedova~~	~~54~~	~~1~~
NED	Kiki Bertens	SWE	Johanna Larsson	73	2
ROU	Raluca Olaru	CZE	Kateřina Siniaková	111	3
SUI	Xenia Knoll	SRB	Aleksandra Krunić	114	4

- ^{1} Rankings are as of July 11, 2016

=== Other entrants ===
The following pairs received wildcards into the doubles main draw:

- (Sweden) Susanne Celik / (Sweden) Rebecca Peterson
- (Sweden) Cornelia Lister / (Latvia) Anastasija Sevastova

=== Withdrawals ===
During the tournament

- (Kazakhstan) Yaroslava Shvedova (Mid-back Injury)
