= 2014 Swedish Open – Women's doubles =

Women's doubles
- 2014 Swedish Open

Final
- Champions: (Slovenia) Andreja Klepač (Spain) María Teresa Torró Flor
- Runners-up: (United Kingdom) Jocelyn Rae (United Kingdom) Ashley Smith
- Score: 6–1, 6–1

Details
- Draw: 16
- Seeds: 4

Events
Singles	men	women
Doubles	men	women
- Swedish Open

Anabel Medina Garrigues and Klára Koukalová (formerly Zakopalová) were the defending champions, but they chose not to participate.
Andreja Klepač and María Teresa Torró Flor won the title, defeating Jocelyn Rae and Anna Smith in the final, 6–1, 6–1.

== Seeds ==
1. (Germany) Julia Görges / (Poland) Katarzyna Piter (quarterfinals)
2. (Canada) Gabriela Dabrowski / (Poland) Alicja Rosolska (quarterfinals)
3. (Spain) Lara Arruabarrena / (Spain) Silvia Soler Espinosa (quarterfinals)
4. (Russia) Alexandra Panova / (France) Laura Thorpe (quarterfinals)

== Draw ==
Key

- Q = Qualifier
- WC = Wild card
- LL = Lucky loser
- Alt = Alternate
- ITF = ITF entry
- PR = Protected ranking
- SR = Special ranking
- SE = Special exempt
- JE = Junior exempt
- JR = Junior Accelerator Programme entrant
- CO = College Accelerator Programme entrant
- NG = Next Gen Accelerator Program entrant
- w/o = Walkover
- r = Retired
- d = Defaulted

First round
1	(Germany) J Görges (Poland) K Piter	6	6
(Latvia) D Marcinkēviča (Netherlands) A Rus	2	4
(United Kingdom) J Rae (United Kingdom) A Smith	4	7	[10]
(Argentina) T Búa (Chile) D Seguel	6	5	[5]
3	(Spain) L Arruabarrena (Spain) S Soler Espinosa	6	6
(Germany) M Barthel (United Kingdom) J Windley	1	4
(Ukraine) A Fomina (Germany) C Shakovets	0	6	[6]
(Uzbekistan) A Amanmuradova (Liechtenstein) S Vogt	6	4	[10]
WC	(Sweden) J Larsson (Sweden) R Peterson	4	6	[11]
WC	(Sweden) S Arvidsson (Sweden) H Melander	6	3	[9]
(Colombia) M Duque Mariño (Brazil) T Pereira
4	(Russia) A Panova (France) L Thorpe	w/o
(Ukraine) K Bondarenko (United States) N Melichar	1	4
(Slovenia) A Klepač (Spain) MT Torró Flor	6	6
(Germany) A Beck (Argentina) M Irigoyen	6	4	[3]
2	(Canada) G Dabrowski (Poland) A Rosolska	4	6	[10]

Quarterfinals
1	(Germany) J Görges (Poland) K Piter	3	6	[3]
(United Kingdom) J Rae (United Kingdom) A Smith	6	4	[10]
3	(Spain) L Arruabarrena (Spain) S Soler Espinosa	3	3
(Uzbekistan) A Amanmuradova (Liechtenstein) S Vogt	6	6
WC	(Sweden) J Larsson (Sweden) R Peterson	6	6
4	(Russia) A Panova (France) L Thorpe	1	1
(Slovenia) A Klepač (Spain) MT Torró Flor	6	6
2	(Canada) G Dabrowski (Poland) A Rosolska	4	3

Semifinals
(United Kingdom) J Rae (United Kingdom) A Smith	6	6
(Uzbekistan) A Amanmuradova (Liechtenstein) S Vogt	3	3
WC	(Sweden) J Larsson (Sweden) R Peterson	2	4
(Slovenia) A Klepač (Spain) MT Torró Flor	6	6

Final
(United Kingdom) J Rae (United Kingdom) A Smith	1	1
(Slovenia) A Klepač (Spain) MT Torró Flor	6	6
