= 2016 Swedish Open – Women's singles =

Women's singles
- 2016 Swedish Open

Final
- Champion: (Germany) Laura Siegemund
- Runner-up: (Czech Republic) Kateřina Siniaková
- Score: 7–5, 6–1

Events
Singles	men	women
Doubles	men	women
- Swedish Open

Johanna Larsson was the defending champion, but lost in the semifinals to Kateřina Siniaková.

Laura Siegemund won her first WTA title, defeating Siniaková in the final, 7–5, 6–1.

== Seeds ==
1. (Germany) Angelique Kerber (second round, withdrew)
2. (Italy) Sara Errani (quarterfinals)
3. (Netherlands) Kiki Bertens (first round)
4. (Germany) Annika Beck (quarterfinals)
5. (Slovakia) Anna Karolína Schmiedlová (second round)
6. (Germany) Laura Siegemund (champion)
7. (Kazakhstan) Yaroslava Shvedova (first round, retired)
8. (Sweden) Johanna Larsson (semifinals)

== Draw ==
Key

- Q = Qualifier
- WC = Wild card
- LL = Lucky loser
- Alt = Alternate
- ITF = ITF entry
- PR = Protected ranking
- SR = Special ranking
- SE = Special exempt
- JE = Junior exempt
- JR = Junior Accelerator Programme entrant
- CO = College Accelerator Programme entrant
- NG = Next Gen Accelerator Program entrant
- w/o = Walkover
- r = Retired
- d = Defaulted

=== Finals ===
Semifinals
6	(Germany) Laura Siegemund	4	6	4
(Germany) Julia Görges	6	3	0^{r}
8	(Sweden) Johanna Larsson	5	1
Q	(Czech Republic) Kateřina Siniaková	7	6

Final
6	(Germany) Laura Siegemund	7	6
Q	(Czech Republic) Kateřina Siniaková	5	1

=== Top half ===
First round
1	(Germany) A Kerber	2	6	6
WC	(Sweden) C Lister	6	4	2
(Spain) L Arruabarrena	6	4	6
(Belarus) A Sasnovich	2	6	1
(Brazil) T Pereira	2	2
Q	(Czech Republic) L Hradecká	6	6
Q	(Ukraine) K Kozlova	1	2
6	(Germany) L Siegemund	6	6
3	(Netherlands) K Bertens	5	2
(United States) B Mattek-Sands	7	6
(Slovenia) P Hercog	7^{9}	3	4
(Germany) J Görges	6^{7}	6	6
(Czech Republic) D Allertová	2	4
(Italy) K Knapp	6	6
(Germany) M Barthel	4	6	3
7	(Kazakhstan) Y Shvedova	6	3	0^{r}

Second round
1	(Germany) A Kerber
(Spain) L Arruabarrena	w/o
Q	(Czech Republic) L Hradecká	5	6^{4}
6	(Germany) L Siegemund	7	7^{7}
(United States) B Mattek-Sands	6	4	2
(Germany) J Görges	2	6	6
(Italy) K Knapp	6	7
(Germany) M Barthel	0	5

Quarterfinals
(Spain) L Arruabarrena	5	3
6	(Germany) L Siegemund	7	6
(Germany) J Görges	4	6	6
(Italy) K Knapp	6	2	3

Semifinals
6	(Germany) L Siegemund	4	6	4
(Germany) J Görges	6	3	0^{r}

=== Bottom half ===
First round
8	(Sweden) J Larsson	7^{7}	6
WC	(Sweden) R Peterson	6^{3}	2
Q	(Spain) S Sorribes Tormo	6	3	6
Q	(Serbia) A Krunić	2	6	2
(Estonia) A Kontaveit	2	4
(Latvia) A Sevastova	6	6
(Romania) S Cîrstea	5	5
4	(Germany) A Beck	7	7
5	(Slovakia) AK Schmiedlová	6	6
WC	(Sweden) S Celik	1	3
Q	(Czech Republic) K Siniaková	6	6
Q	(Slovakia) J Čepelová	2	2
WC	(Russia) E Kulichkova	6^{5}	1
SE	(Switzerland) V Golubic	7^{7}	6
(Turkey) Ç Büyükakçay	2	3
2	(Italy) S Errani	6	6

Second round
8	(Sweden) J Larsson	6	6
Q	(Spain) S Sorribes Tormo	0	3
(Latvia) A Sevastova	2	0
4	(Germany) A Beck	6	6
5	(Slovakia) AK Schmiedlová	3	6	4
Q	(Czech Republic) K Siniaková	6	4	6
SE	(Switzerland) V Golubic	6^{6}	1
2	(Italy) S Errani	7^{8}	6

Quarterfinals
8	(Sweden) J Larsson	7	6
4	(Germany) A Beck	5	1
Q	(Czech Republic) K Siniaková	7^{7}	6
2	(Italy) S Errani	6^{2}	3

Semifinals
8	(Sweden) J Larsson	5	1
Q	(Czech Republic) K Siniaková	7	6

== Qualifying ==
=== Seeds ===
1. (Czech Republic) Kateřina Siniaková (qualified)
2. (Ukraine) Kateryna Kozlova (qualified)
3. (Greece) Maria Sakkari (qualifying competition)
4. (Switzerland) Stefanie Vögele (qualifying competition)
5. (Slovakia) Jana Čepelová (qualified)
6. (Luxembourg) Mandy Minella (first round)
7. (New Zealand) Marina Erakovic (qualifying competition)
8. (Spain) Sílvia Soler Espinosa (qualifying competition)
9. (Serbia) Aleksandra Krunić (qualified)
10. (Belgium) Elise Mertens (qualifying competition)
11. (Belgium) Ysaline Bonaventure (first round)
12. (Spain) Sara Sorribes Tormo (qualified)

=== Qualifiers ===
1. (Czech Republic) Kateřina Siniaková
2. (Ukraine) Kateryna Kozlova
3. (Czech Republic) Lucie Hradecká
4. (Spain) Sara Sorribes Tormo
5. (Slovakia) Jana Čepelová
6. (Serbia) Aleksandra Krunić

=== Draw ===
==== First qualifier ====
First round
1	(Czech Republic) Kateřina Siniaková	6	6
(Netherlands) Lesley Kerkhove	3	2
(Tunisia) Ons Jabeur	7	1	3
8	(Spain) Sílvia Soler Espinosa	5	6	6

Qualifying competition
1	(Czech Republic) Kateřina Siniaková	2	6	6
8	(Spain) Sílvia Soler Espinosa	6	2	3

==== Second qualifier ====
First round
2	(Ukraine) Kateryna Kozlova	7	7
(Japan) Misa Eguchi	5	5
WC	(Sweden) Julia Rosenqvist	3	0
10	(Belgium) Elise Mertens	6	6

Qualifying competition
2	(Ukraine) Kateryna Kozlova	6	6
10	(Belgium) Elise Mertens	1	3

==== Third qualifier ====
First round
3	(Greece) Maria Sakkari	6	6
(France) Alizé Lim	3	2
(Czech Republic) Lucie Hradecká	4	6	6
11	(Belgium) Ysaline Bonaventure	6	3	2

Qualifying competition
3	(Greece) Maria Sakkari	6	3	1
(Czech Republic) Lucie Hradecká	2	6	6

==== Fourth qualifier ====
First round
4	(Switzerland) Stefanie Vögele	7	2	6
WC	(Sweden) Kajsa Rinaldo Persson	5	6	1
(Netherlands) Richèl Hogenkamp	6	2	4
12	(Spain) Sara Sorribes Tormo	4	6	6

Qualifying competition
4	(Switzerland) Stefanie Vögele	4	3
12	(Spain) Sara Sorribes Tormo	6	6

==== Fifth qualifier ====
First round
5	(Slovakia) Jana Čepelová	6	6
WC	(Sweden) Anette Munozova	2	0
WC	(Sweden) Fanny Östlund	5	2
7	(New Zealand) Marina Erakovic	7	6

Qualifying competition
5	(Slovakia) Jana Čepelová	6	6
7	(New Zealand) Marina Erakovic	1	3

==== Sixth qualifier ====
First round
6	(Luxembourg) Mandy Minella	2	2
(Netherlands) Cindy Burger	6	6
(Romania) Andreea Mitu	5	2
9	(Serbia) Aleksandra Krunić	7	6

Qualifying competition
(Netherlands) Cindy Burger	2	1
9	(Serbia) Aleksandra Krunić	6	6
