= 2014 Swedish Open – Women's singles =

Women's singles
- 2014 Swedish Open

Final
- Champion: (Germany) Mona Barthel
- Runner-up: (South Africa) Chanelle Scheepers
- Score: 6–3, 7–6^{(7–3)}

Details
- Draw: 32
- Seeds: 8

Events
Singles	men	women
Doubles	men	women
- Swedish Open

Serena Williams was the defending champion, but withdrew before the tournament began.

Unseeded Mona Barthel won the title, defeating Chanelle Scheepers in the final, 6–3, 7–6^{(7–3)}.

== Seeds ==
1. (France) Alizé Cornet (first round)
2. (Russia) Anastasia Pavlyuchenkova (first round)
3. (Italy) Camila Giorgi (first round)
4. (Kazakhstan) Yaroslava Shvedova (first round)
5. (Slovakia) Anna Karolína Schmiedlová (first round)
6. (Germany) Annika Beck (second round)
7. (Spain) María Teresa Torró Flor (first round)
8. (Slovenia) Polona Hercog (first round)

== Draw ==
Key

- Q = Qualifier
- WC = Wild card
- LL = Lucky loser
- Alt = Alternate
- ITF = ITF entry
- PR = Protected ranking
- SR = Special ranking
- SE = Special exempt
- JE = Junior exempt
- JR = Junior Accelerator Programme entrant
- CO = College Accelerator Programme entrant
- NG = Next Gen Accelerator Program entrant
- w/o = Walkover
- r = Retired
- d = Defaulted

=== Finals ===
Semifinals
(Slovakia) Jana Čepelová	5	2
(South Africa) Chanelle Scheepers	7	6
(Germany) Mona Barthel	6	4	7
(Spain) Silvia Soler Espinosa	2	6	5

Final
(South Africa) Chanelle Scheepers	3	6^{3}
(Germany) Mona Barthel	6	7^{7}

=== Top half ===
First round
1/WC	(France) A Cornet	6^{3}	3
Q	(Estonia) A Kontaveit	7^{7}	6
WC	(Sweden) R Peterson	4	4
(Slovakia) J Čepelová	6	6
(Brazil) T Pereira	1^{r}
Q	(Kazakhstan) Y Putintseva	3
(Germany) D Pfizenmaier	7	7^{7}
8	(Slovenia) P Hercog	5	6^{5}
4	(Kazakhstan) Y Shvedova	5	3
Q	(Germany) L Siegemund	7	6
(Colombia) M Duque	3	4
(South Africa) C Scheepers	6	6
(Romania) I-C Begu	1	2^{r}
(Spain) L Arruabarrena	6	4
(Poland) K Piter	3	6	3
6	(Germany) A Beck	6	4	6

Second round
Q	(Estonia) A Kontaveit	4	3
(Slovakia) J Čepelová	6	6
Q	(Kazakhstan) Y Putintseva	6	4	6
(Germany) D Pfizenmaier	3	6	2
Q	(Germany) L Siegemund	6	4	5
(South Africa) C Scheepers	3	6	7
(Spain) L Arruabarrena	2	6	7^{7}
6	(Germany) A Beck	6	4	6^{2}

Quarterfinals
(Slovakia) J Čepelová	6	7
Q	(Kazakhstan) Y Putintseva	4	5
(South Africa) C Scheepers	6	4	6
(Spain) L Arruabarrena	2	6	3

Semifinals
(Slovakia) J Čepelová	5	2
(South Africa) C Scheepers	7	6

=== Bottom half ===
First round
5	(Slovakia) AK Schmiedlová	3	1
Q	(Netherlands) R Hogenkamp	6	6
(Sweden) J Larsson	2	6	5
(Estonia) K Kanepi	6	4	7
(Germany) M Barthel	6	6
Q	(Czech Republic) T Martincová	4	4
Q	(Canada) G Dabrowski	3	6	6
3	(Italy) C Giorgi	6	3	2
7	(Spain) MT Torró Flor	2	0
(Germany) J Görges	6	6
(Spain) S Soler Espinosa	6^{3}	6	6
WC	(Sweden) S Arvidsson	7^{7}	3	3
(Russia) A Panova	6	7
(Romania) A Cadanțu	2	5
(United States) G Min	6	6
2	(Russia) A Pavlyuchenkova	0	4

Second round
Q	(Netherlands) R Hogenkamp	3	1
(Estonia) K Kanepi	6	6
(Germany) M Barthel	6	3	6
Q	(Canada) G Dabrowski	4	6	4
(Germany) J Görges	6	1	3
(Spain) S Soler Espinosa	4	6	6
(Russia) A Panova	6	6
(United States) G Min	2	4

Quarterfinals
(Estonia) K Kanepi	2	6^{4}
(Germany) M Barthel	6	7^{7}
(Spain) S Soler Espinosa	6	6
(Russia) A Panova	3	2

Semifinals
(Germany) M Barthel	6	4	7
(Spain) S Soler Espinosa	2	6	5

== Qualifying ==
=== Seeds ===
1. (Netherlands) Arantxa Rus (qualifying competition)
2. (France) Alizé Lim (qualifying competition)
3. (Netherlands) Richèl Hogenkamp (qualified)
4. (Liechtenstein) Stephanie Vogt (first round)
5. (Argentina) María Irigoyen (first round)
6. (Estonia) Anett Kontaveit (qualified)
7. (United States) Irina Falconi (first round; retired)
8. (Italy) Gioia Barbieri (qualifying competition)
9. (Netherlands) Indy de Vroome (first round)
10. (Latvia) Diāna Marcinkēviča (first round)
11. (Germany) Laura Siegemund (qualified)
12. (Kazakhstan) Yulia Putintseva (qualified)

=== Qualifiers ===
1. (Czech Republic) Tereza Martincová
2. (Germany) Laura Siegemund
3. (Netherlands) Richèl Hogenkamp
4. (Kazakhstan) Yulia Putintseva
5. (Canada) Gabriela Dabrowski
6. (Estonia) Anett Kontaveit

=== Draw ===
==== First qualifier ====
First round
1	(Netherlands) Arantxa Rus	6	6
WC	(Sweden) Fanny Östlund	4	3
(Czech Republic) Tereza Martincová	5	6	2
7	(United States) Irina Falconi	7	2	0^{r}

Qualifying competition
1	(Netherlands) Arantxa Rus	1	2
(Czech Republic) Tereza Martincová	6	6

==== Second qualifier ====
First round
2	(France) Alizé Lim	3	7	7
(Norway) Ulrikke Eikeri	6	5	5
WC	(Sweden) Kajsa Rinaldo Persson	3	3
11	(Germany) Laura Siegemund	6	6

Qualifying competition
2	(France) Alizé Lim	0	2
11	(Germany) Laura Siegemund	6	6

==== Third qualifier ====
First round
3	(Netherlands) Richèl Hogenkamp	6	4	6
(Italy) Maria Elena Camerin	1	6	4
(Chile) Daniela Seguel	3	0
8	(Italy) Gioia Barbieri	6	6

Qualifying competition
3	(Netherlands) Richèl Hogenkamp	1	6	6
8	(Italy) Gioia Barbieri	6	3	4

==== Fourth qualifier ====
First round
4	(Liechtenstein) Stephanie Vogt	5	4
(Ukraine) Kateryna Bondarenko	7	6
(France) Laura Thorpe	6	3	0
12	(Kazakhstan) Yulia Putintseva	2	6	6

Qualifying competition
(Ukraine) Kateryna Bondarenko	4	6	0
12	(Kazakhstan) Yulia Putintseva	6	2	6

==== Fifth qualifier ====
First round
5	(Argentina) María Irigoyen	4	4
(Canada) Gabriela Dabrowski	6	6
WC	(Sweden) Susanne Celik	2	6	6
10	(Latvia) Diāna Marcinkēviča	6	0	3

Qualifying competition
(Canada) Gabriela Dabrowski	4	7	6
WC	(Sweden) Susanne Celik	6	5	1

==== Sixth qualifier ====
First round
6	(Estonia) Anett Kontaveit	2	6	6
WC	(Sweden) Hilda Melander	6	2	4
(Czech Republic) Eva Birnerová	7	3	6
9	(Netherlands) Indy de Vroome	5	6	3

Qualifying competition
6	(Estonia) Anett Kontaveit	6	2	6
(Czech Republic) Eva Birnerová	4	6	1
