= 2016 Swedish Open – Women's doubles =

Women's doubles
- 2016 Swedish Open

Final
- Champions: (Romania) Andreea Mitu (Poland) Alicja Rosolska
- Runners-up: (Netherlands) Lesley Kerkhove (Belarus) Lidziya Marozava
- Score: 6–3, 7–5

Events
Singles	men	women
Doubles	men	women
- Swedish Open

Kiki Bertens and Johanna Larsson were the defending champions, but lost in the quarterfinals to Andreea Mitu and Alicja Rosolska.

Mitu and Rosolska went on to win the title, defeating Lesley Kerkhove and Lidziya Marozava in the final, 6–3, 7–5.

== Seeds ==
1. (Georgia (country)) Oksana Kalashnikova / (Kazakhstan) Yaroslava Shvedova (withdrew)
2. (Netherlands) Kiki Bertens / (Sweden) Johanna Larsson (quarterfinals)
3. (Romania) Raluca Olaru / (Czech Republic) Kateřina Siniaková (quarterfinals)
4. (Switzerland) Xenia Knoll / (Serbia) Aleksandra Krunić (first round)

== Draw ==
Key

- Q = Qualifier
- WC = Wild card
- LL = Lucky loser
- Alt = Alternate
- ITF = ITF entry
- PR = Protected ranking
- SR = Special ranking
- SE = Special exempt
- JE = Junior exempt
- JR = Junior Accelerator Programme entrant
- CO = College Accelerator Programme entrant
- NG = Next Gen Accelerator Program entrant
- w/o = Walkover
- r = Retired
- d = Defaulted

First round
1	(Georgia (country)) O Kalashnikova (Kazakhstan) Y Shvedova
(Spain) L Arruabarrena (Luxembourg) M Minella	w/o
(Netherlands) D Schuurs (Czech Republic) R Voráčová	6	6
(Belgium) Y Bonaventure (Belgium) E Mertens	3	4
3	(Romania) R Olaru (Czech Republic) K Siniaková	6	6
(Netherlands) C Burger (Brazil) L Pigossi	1	1
(Australia) J Moore (Thailand) V Wongteanchai	6	6^{5}	[9]
(Netherlands) L Kerkhove (Belarus) L Marozava	2	7^{7}	[11]
(Czech Republic) L Kunčíková (Czech Republic) K Stuchlá	6	6
(Japan) K Hisami (Japan) K Takahata	4	3
WC	(Sweden) S Celik (Sweden) R Peterson	6	3	[10]
4	(Switzerland) X Knoll (Serbia) A Krunić	3	6	[8]
(Romania) A Mitu (Poland) A Rosolska	6	6
WC	(Sweden) C Lister (Latvia) A Sevastova	3	1
(United Kingdom) J Rae (United Kingdom) A Smith	7^{7}	4	[8]
2	(Netherlands) K Bertens (Sweden) J Larsson	6^{1}	6	[10]

Quarterfinals
(Spain) L Arruabarrena (Luxembourg) M Minella	6^{3}	6	[8]
(Netherlands) D Schuurs (Czech Republic) R Voráčová	7^{7}	4	[10]
3	(Romania) R Olaru (Czech Republic) K Siniaková	6	2	[3]
(Netherlands) L Kerkhove (Belarus) L Marozava	4	6	[10]
(Czech Republic) L Kunčíková (Czech Republic) K Stuchlá	2	6	[10]
WC	(Sweden) S Celik (Sweden) R Peterson	6	4	[7]
(Romania) A Mitu (Poland) A Rosolska	6	2	[10]
2	(Netherlands) K Bertens (Sweden) J Larsson	3	6	[8]

Semifinals
(Netherlands) D Schuurs (Czech Republic) R Voráčová	5	2
(Netherlands) L Kerkhove (Belarus) L Marozava	7	6
(Czech Republic) L Kunčíková (Czech Republic) K Stuchlá	2	2
(Romania) A Mitu (Poland) A Rosolska	6	6

Final
(Netherlands) L Kerkhove (Belarus) L Marozava	3	5
(Romania) A Mitu (Poland) A Rosolska	6	7
