= 2018 Båstad Challenger =

- Date: 9–14 July
- Edition: 3rd
- Draw: 32S / 16D
- Surface: Clay / Outdoors
- Location: Båstad, Sweden

Champions

Singles
- (Spain) Pedro Martínez

Doubles
- (Finland) Harri Heliövaara / (Switzerland) Henri Laaksonen
- Båstad Challenger

The 2018 Båstad Challenger was a professional tennis tournament played on clay courts. It was the third edition of the tournament which was part of the 2018 ATP Challenger Tour. It took place in Båstad, Sweden between 9 and 14 July 2018.

== Singles main-draw entrants ==
=== Seeds ===
Country	Player	Rank^{1}	Seed
ARG	Guido Andreozzi	105	1
SWE	Elias Ymer	108	2
FRA	Corentin Moutet	125	3
BRA	Thiago Monteiro	130	4
SUI	Henri Laaksonen	142	5
FRA	Calvin Hemery	148	6
CAN	Félix Auger-Aliassime	152	7
GER	Oscar Otte	166	8

- ^{1} Rankings are as of 2 July 2018.

=== Other entrants ===
The following players received wildcards into the singles main draw:

- (Sweden) Filip Bergevi
- (Sweden) Markus Eriksson
- (Sweden) Jonathan Mridha
- (Sweden) Mikael Ymer

The following players received entry from the qualifying draw:

- (France) Geoffrey Blancaneaux
- (Slovakia) Filip Horanský
- (France) Jules Okala
- (China) Wu Di

The following player received entry as a lucky loser:

- (Slovakia) Lukáš Klein

== Champions ==
=== Singles ===
- (Spain) Pedro Martínez def. (France) Corentin Moutet 7–6^{(7–5)}, 6–4.

=== Doubles ===
- (Finland) Harri Heliövaara / (Switzerland) Henri Laaksonen def. (Czech Republic) Zdeněk Kolář / (Portugal) Gonçalo Oliveira 6–4, 6–3.
