= Båstad Challenger =

Defunct tennis tournament
- Location: Båstad, Sweden
- Venue: Båstad Tennis Stadium
- Category: ATP Challenger Tour
- Surface: Clay / Outdoors
- Draw: 32S/32Q/16D
- Prize money: €42,500+H

The Båstad Challenger was a men's tennis tournament held in Båstad, Sweden founded in 2016. The event is part of the ATP Challenger Tour and is played on outdoor clay courts until 2018 when it was discontinued.

== Past finals ==
=== Singles ===
Year	Champion	Runner-up	Score
2018	(Spain) Pedro Martínez	(France) Corentin Moutet	7–6^{(7–5)}, 6–4
2017	(Serbia) Dušan Lajović	(Argentina) Leonardo Mayer	6–2, 7–6^{(7–4)}
2016	(Argentina) Horacio Zeballos	(Spain) Roberto Carballés Baena	6–3, 6–4

=== Doubles ===
Year	Champions	Runners-up	Score
2018	(Finland) Harri Heliövaara (Switzerland) Henri Laaksonen	(Czech Republic) Zdeněk Kolář (Portugal) Gonçalo Oliveira	6–4, 6–3
2017	(Turkey) Tuna Altuna (Czech Republic) Václav Šafránek	(India) Sriram Balaji (India) Vijay Sundar Prashanth	6–1, 6–4
2016	(Sweden) Isak Arvidsson (Sweden) Fred Simonsson	(Sweden) Johan Brunström (Sweden) Andreas Siljeström	6–3, 7–5
