= Václav Šafránek =

Czech tennis player (born 1994)

- Country (sports): Czech Republic
- Born: 20 May 1994 (age 31) Brno, Czech Republic
- Height: 1.85 m (6 ft 1 in)
- Plays: Right-handed (two-handed backhand)
- Prize money: $283,571

Singles
- Career record: 0–3
- Career titles: 0
- Highest ranking: No. 191 (6 November 2017)

Grand Slam singles results
- Australian Open: 1R (2018)
- Wimbledon: Q1 (2018)
- US Open: 1R (2017)

Doubles
- Career record: 0–0
- Career titles: 0
- Highest ranking: No. 286 (18 September 2017)
- Last updated on: 10 February 2023.

Václav Šafránek (born 20 May 1994) is a former Czech tennis player.

Šafránek has a career-high ATP singles ranking of 191 achieved on 6 November 2017. He also has a career-high doubles ranking of 286 achieved on 18 September 2017. Šafránek has won one ATP Challenger doubles title at the 2017 Båstad Challenger.

== Biography ==
Šafránek made his senior debut at the 2011 ITF Men's Circuit, where he lost in second round to German Nico Matić, earning his first ranking points in the ATP World Tour of the same year. The duo agreed to play together a few days before the tournament.

Before advancing, Šafránek went through a three-round qualifying round with a decisive victory over fourth-seeded Ukrainian Sergiy Stachovsky in three sets. However, in the first round of the New York singles at the Grandstand, he failed to beat Bulgarian number seven and world number nine Grigor Dimitrov without winning a set. Šafránek played his first Grand Slam qualifiers at the 2017 French Open and 2017 Wimbledon, where he was defeated in the opening rounds by Denis Kudla and Alejandro González, respectively. He qualified for the 2018 Australian Open and lost to compatriot Jiří Veselý in three sets in the first round of the singles.

== Tour titles ==
Legend
Grand Slam (0)
ATP Masters Series (0)
ATP Tour (0)
Challengers (1)

=== Doubles ===
Result	Date	Category	Tournament	Surface	Partner	Opponents	Score
Winner	15 July 2017	Challenger	Båstad, Sweden	Clay	(Turkey) Tuna Altuna	(India) Sriram Balaji (India) Vijay Sundar Prashanth	6–1, 6–4
