= Carl Söderlund =

Swedish tennis player

- Country (sports): Sweden
- Born: 3 June 1997 (age 27); Stockholm, Sweden
- Height: 1.88 m (6 ft 2 in)
- Plays: Right-handed (two handed-backhand)
- College: Virginia
- Prize money: $35,801

Singles
- Career record: 1–1 (at ATP Tour level, Grand Slam level, and in Davis Cup)
- Career titles: 0
- Highest ranking: No. 387 (8 May 2017)

Doubles
- Career record: 0–1 (at ATP Tour level, Grand Slam level, and in Davis Cup)
- Career titles: 0
- Highest ranking: No. 1303 (10 October 2016)
- Last updated on: 5 February 2022.

Carl Söderlund (born 3 June 1997) is a Swedish tennis player.

Söderlund reached a career high ATP singles ranking of 387 achieved on 8 May 2017. In the ATP doubles ranking he reached a career high of 1303 achieved on 10 October 2016. Söderlund won 3 ITF Futures titles on the ITF Men's Circuit.

Söderlund made his ATP main draw debut at the 2016 Swedish Open, where he received a wildcard into the singles main draw. He faced fellow wildcard and compatriot Fred Simonsson in the first round.

== ATP Challenger and ITF Futures finals ==
=== Singles: 4 (3–1) ===
Legend ATP Challenger (0–0) ITF Futures (3–1)	Finals by surface Hard (1–1) Clay (2–0) Grass (0–0) Carpet (0–0)

Result	W–L	Date	Tournament	Tier	Surface	Opponent	Score
Win	1–0	Nov 2015	Norway F3, Oslo	Futures	Hard (i)	(Belgium) Sander Gillé	6–4, 6–2
Win	2–0	May 2016	Sweden F1, Karlskrona	Futures	Clay	(Japan) Kaichi Uchida	6–1, 6–2
Loss	2–1	Jan 2017	USA F1, Los Angeles	Futures	Hard	(United States) Mackenzie McDonald	4–6, 0–6
Win	3–1	Aug 2019	M15 Koksijde, Belgium	World Tennis Tour	Clay	(Belgium) Gauthier Onclin	6–4, 6–0
