= Fred Simonsson =

Swedish tennis player

- Country (sports): Sweden
- Residence: Stockholm, Sweden
- Born: 27 November 1994 (age 30) Lidingö, Sweden
- Height: 185 cm (6 ft 1 in)
- Turned pro: 2012
- Plays: Right-handed (two handed-backhand)
- Coach: Peter Carlsson
- Prize money: $63,441

Singles
- Career record: 0–1 (at ATP Tour level, Grand Slam level, and in Davis Cup)
- Career titles: 1 Futures
- Highest ranking: No. 633 (1 August 2016)

Grand Slam singles results
- Australian Open Junior: Q1 (2012)
- French Open Junior: Q1 (2012)

Doubles
- Career record: 3–9 (at ATP Tour level, Grand Slam level, and in Davis Cup)
- Career titles: 2 Challengers, 14 Futures
- Highest ranking: No. 195 (20 February 2017)

Grand Slam doubles results
- Australian Open Junior: 1R (2012)

Fred Simonsson (born 27 November 1994) is a Swedish tennis player.

Simonsson has a career high ATP singles ranking of 633, achieved on 1 August 2016. His career high ATP doubles ranking of 195 was achieved on 20 February 2017.

== Tennis career ==
Simonsson made his ATP main draw doubles debut at the 2012 Swedish Open. He reached the quarterfinals of the 2015 Swedish Open partnering Jonathan Mridha and repeated the achievement at the 2016 Swedish Open partnering Isak Arvidsson.

In March 2016 Simonsson won the ATP Challenger Tour doubles tournament RC Hotel Open partnering Isak Arvidsson. With the same partner he won the 2016 Båstad Challenger in July. Simonsson retired in 2019 and shortly thereafter started to work as an assistant producer for Day International AB, an independent production agency in photo, film and digital content production.

== Personal life ==
Simonsson is a big supporter of the Stockholm team Djurgårdens IF since childhood.

== ATP Challengers and ITF Futures titles ==
=== Singles: 1 ===
Legend
ATP Challenger Tour (0)
ITF Futures Tour (1)

No.	Date	Tournament	Surface	Opponent	Score
1.	May 2015	Karlskrona, Sweden F1	Clay	(Germany) Timon Reichelt	6–1, 6–3

=== Doubles: 16 ===
Legend (doubles)
ATP Challenger Tour (2)
ITF Futures Tour (14)

No.	Date	Tournament	Surface	Partner	Opponents	Score
1.	Oct 2012	Jönköping, Sweden F7	Hard	(Sweden) Filip Bergevi	(Sweden) Kalle Averfalk (Sweden) Robin Olin	6–2, 6–3
2.	Sep 2013	Falun, Sweden F6	Hard	(Sweden) Milos Sekulic	(Sweden) Jesper Brunström (Finland) Henri Kontinen	3–6, 6–3, [10–5]
3.	May 2015	Båstad, Sweden F2	Clay	(Sweden) Jonathan Mridha	(Sweden) Daniel Appelgren (Sweden) Mikael Ymer	6–1, 6–7^{(5–7)}, [10–7]
4.	May 2015	Båstad, Sweden F3	Clay	(Sweden) Jonathan Mridha	(Sweden) Serdar Bojadjieva (Romania) Dragoș Nicolae Mădăraș	7–6^{(7–4)},6–2
1.	Mar 2016	Jönköping Challenger, Sweden	Hard	(Sweden) Isak Arvidsson	(Sweden) Markus Eriksson (Sweden) Milos Sekulic	6–3, 3–6, [10–6]
5.	Mar 2016	Heraklion, Greece F1	Hard	(Sweden) Isak Arvidsson	(Belarus) Maxim Dubarenco (Sweden) Markus Eriksson	6–1, 7–6^{(7–3)}
6.	May 2016	Karlskrona, Sweden F1	Clay	(Sweden) Isak Arvidsson	(Netherlands) Marc Dijkhuizen (Netherlands) Colin Van Beem	w/o
2.	Jul 2016	Båstad Challenger, Sweden	Clay	(Sweden) Isak Arvidsson	(Sweden) Johan Brunström (Sweden) Andreas Siljeström	6–3, 7–5
7.	Oct 2016	Falun, Sweden F5	Hard	(Sweden) Isak Arvidsson	(Sweden) Markus Eriksson (Sweden) Milos Sekulic	7–6^{(7–1)}, 4–6, [11–9]
8.	Nov 2016	Mishref, Kuwait F1	Hard	(Germany) Daniel Altmaier	(Uzbekistan) Sanjar Fayziev (Uzbekistan) Shonigmatjon Shofayziyev	7–6^{(7–3)}, 6–2
9.	May 2017	Båstad, Sweden F2	Clay	(Sweden) Isak Arvidsson	(Portugal) Fred Gil (Spain) Mario Vilella Martínez	6–3, 3–6, [10–8]
10.	Sep 2017	Santa Margherita di Pula, Italy F29	Clay	(Italy) Corrado Summaria	(Italy) Cristian Carli (Italy) Andrea Vavassori	6–1, 6–4
11.	Mar 2018	Doha, Qatar F1	Hard	(Belgium) Jonas Merckx	(Belgium) Zizou Bergs (Netherlands) Scott Griekspoor	6–7^{(3–7)}, 6–3, [10–4]
12.	Mar 2018	Doha, Qatar F2	Hard	(Belgium) Zizou Bergs	(Czech Republic) Marek Gengel (Czech Republic) Matěj Vocel	6–4, 3–6, [10–6]
13.	May 2018	Karlskrona, Sweden F1	Clay	(Sweden) Markus Eriksson	(Finland) Otto Virtanen (Germany) Louis Wessels	6–1, 1–6, [10–5]
14.	Sep 2018	Stockholm, Sweden F4	Hard	(Sweden) Markus Eriksson	(Switzerland) Antoine Bellier (Germany) Johannes Härteis	2–6, 6–4, [10–8]

== See also ==
- List of Sweden Davis Cup team representatives
