= Isak Arvidsson =

Swedish tennis player

- Country (sports): Sweden
- Residence: Båstad, Sweden
- Born: 6 August 1992 (age 33) Hjo, Sweden
- Turned pro: 2010
- Retired: 2017
- Prize money: $75,435

Singles
- Career record: 2–9 (at ATP Tour level, Grand Slam level, and in Davis Cup)
- Career titles: 0
- Highest ranking: No. 489 (17 November 2014)

Doubles
- Career record: 3–11 (at ATP Tour level, Grand Slam level, and in Davis Cup)
- Career titles: 0
- Highest ranking: No. 183 (30 January 2017)

Team competitions
- Davis Cup: 2–11

Erik Isak Arvidsson (born 6 August 1992) is a Swedish former tennis player.

Arvidsson has a career high ATP singles ranking of 489 achieved on 17 November 2014. He also has a career high ATP doubles ranking of 183, achieved on 30 January 2017.

Arvidsson has represented Sweden at Davis Cup, where he has a win–loss record of 2–11.

He reached the quarterfinals of the 2016 Swedish Open partnering Fred Simonsson.

== Futures and Challenger finals ==
=== Singles: 6 (4–2) ===
Legend
Challengers 0 (0–0)
Futures 6 (4–2)

Result	W–L	Date	Tournament	Tier	Surface	Opponent	Score
Win	1–0	Sep 2012	Danderyd, Sweden F5	Futures	Hard (i)	(Finland) Timo Nieminen	7–6^{(8–6)}, 6–3
Loss	1–1	Feb 2014	Palm Coast, USA F4	Futures	Clay	(France) Gianni Mina	2–6, 0–6
Win	2–1	Mar 2014	Shrewsbury, Great Britain F6	Futures	Hard (i)	(Finland) Micke Kontinen	6–3, 7–5
Loss	2–2	Jun 2014	Siófok, Hungary F3	Futures	Clay	(Sweden) Patrik Rosenholm	5–7, 6–3, 5–7
Win	3–2	Mar 2015	Ramat HaSharon, Israel F3	Futures	Hard	(Israel) Noam Okun	4–6, 6–3, 6–4
Win	4–2	May 2016	Båstad, Sweden F3	Futures	Clay	(Sweden) Fred Simonsson	6–2, 6–0

=== Doubles: 32 (25–7) ===
Legend
ATP Challenger (2–0)
ITF Futures (23–7)

Result	W–L	Date	Tournament	Tier	Surface	Partner	Opponents	Score
Win	1–0	Jun 2013	Morocco F2, Casablanca	Futures	Clay	(Finland) Micke Kontinen	(Sweden) Markus Eriksson (Sweden) Milos Sekulic	7–5, 3–6, [10–7]
Win	2–0	Jun 2013	Morocco F3, Mohammedia	Futures	Clay	(Finland) Micke Kontinen	(Morocco) Yassine Idmbarek (Morocco) Mehdi Jdi	7–6^{7–3}, 6–3
Win	3–0	Jul 2013	Denmark F1, Kolding	Futures	Clay	(Sweden) Milos Sekulic	(Sweden) Filip Bergevi (Sweden) Fred Simonsson	6–2, 7–5
Loss	3–1	Jul 2013	Denmark F2, Aarhus	Futures	Clay	(Sweden) Milos Sekulic	(Denmark) Esben Hess-Olesen (Norway) Oystein Steiro	0–6, 1–6
Win	4–1	Aug 2013	Denmark F3, Copenhagen	Futures	Clay	(Sweden) Milos Sekulic	(Sweden) Patrik Rosenholm (France) Davy Sum	6–4, 1–6, [10–8]
Win	5–1	Sep 2013	Sweden F5, Danderyd	Futures	Hard	(Finland) Micke Kontinen	(Canada) Érik Chvojka (Sweden) Lucas Renard	7–5, 6–2
Loss	5–2	Feb 2014	Great Britain F6, Shrewsbury	Futures	Hard (i)	(Finland) Micke Kontinen	(United Kingdom) Luke Bambridge (United Kingdom) Toby Martin	3–6, 4–6
Win	6–2	Mar 2014	France F6, Poitiers	Futures	Hard	(Sweden) Markus Eriksson	(Belgium) Niels Desein (Belgium) Yannick Mertens	w/o
Win	7–2	May 2014	Sweden F2, Båstad	Futures	Clay	(Sweden) Markus Eriksson	(Sweden) Jacob Adaktusson (Sweden) Robin Olin	6–2, 4–6, [10–6]
Win	8–2	May 2014	Sweden F3, Båstad	Futures	Clay	(Sweden) Markus Eriksson	(Finland) Timi Kivijarvi (Finland) Henrik Sillanpää	6–4, 6–2
Win	9–2	Jun 2014	Hungary F1, Budapest	Futures	Clay	(Sweden) Robin Olin	(Switzerland) Riccardo Maiga (Finland) Henrik Sillanpää	6–4, 2–6, [10–6]
Loss	9–3	Jun 2014	Hungary F2, Siófok	Futures	Clay	(Sweden) Robin Olin	(Russia) Kirill Dmitriev (Kazakhstan) Dmitry Popko	2–6, 6–4, [13–15]
Win	10–3	Aug 2014	Denmark F2, Copenhagen	Futures	Clay	(Denmark) Thomas Kromann	(Netherlands) Sander Arends (Netherlands) Niels Lootsma	7–5, 7–6^{7–2}
Loss	10–4	Oct 2014	Sweden F6, Jönköping	Futures	Hard (i)	(Sweden) Markus Eriksson	(Republic of Ireland) David O'Hare (United Kingdom) Joe Salisbury	6–7^{(8–10)}, 6–7^{(3–7)}
Win	11–4	Jan 2015	Great Britain F1, Sheffield	Futures	Hard (i)	(Finland) Micke Kontinen	(United Kingdom) Luke Bambridge (United Kingdom) Andrew Bettles	6–4, 5–7, [10–6]
Loss	11–5	Jan 2015	Great Britain F2, Sunderland	Futures	Hard (i)	(Finland) Micke Kontinen	(United Kingdom) Lewis Burton (United Kingdom) Marcus Willis	3–6, 2–6
Win	12–5	Jun 2015	Croatia F13, Bol	Futures	Clay	(Sweden) Christian Samuelsson	(Croatia) Marin Bradarić (Croatia) Tomislav Draganja	6–7^{(1–7)}, 6–3, [10–5]
Win	13–5	Jun 2015	Austria F2, Seefeld	Futures	Clay	(Sweden) Daniel Windahl	(Brazil) Eduardo Dischinger (Brazil) Caio Silva	2–6, 7–5, [10–4]
Loss	13–6	Jul 2015	Slovakia F3, Piešťany	Futures	Clay	(Hungary) Gábor Borsos	(Slovakia) Filip Horanský (Slovakia) Igor Zelenay	4–6, 6–1, [13–15]
Win	14–6	Jan 2016	USA F4, Sunrise	Futures	Clay	(Japan) Kaichi Uchida	(Hungary) Péter Nagy (Canada) Denis Shapovalov	6–4, 6–4
Loss	14–7	Jan 2016	USA F5, Weston	Futures	Clay	(Japan) Kaichi Uchida	(United States) Junior Alexander Ore (United States) Hunter Reese	6–7^{(4–7)}, 6–3, [8–10]
Win	15–7	Mar 2016	Jönköping Challenger, Sweden	Challenger	Hard	(Sweden) Fred Simonsson	(Sweden) Markus Eriksson (Sweden) Milos Sekulic	6–3, 3–6, [10–6]
Win	16–7	Mar 2016	Greece F1, Heraklion	Futures	Hard	(Sweden) Fred Simonsson	(Belarus) Maxim Dubarenco (Sweden) Markus Eriksson	6–1, 7–6^{(7–3)}
Win	17–7	May 2016	Sweden F1, Karlskrona	Futures	Clay	(Sweden) Fred Simonsson	(Netherlands) Marc Dijkhuizen (Netherlands) Colin Van Beem	w/o
Win	18–7	May 2016	Sweden F3, Båstad	Futures	Clay	(Germany) George von Massow	(Sweden) Markus Eriksson (Sweden) Milos Sekulic	6–0, 6–1
Win	19–7	Jul 2016	Båstad Challenger, Sweden	Challenger	Clay	(Sweden) Fred Simonsson	(Sweden) Johan Brunström (Sweden) Andreas Siljeström	6–3, 7–5
Win	20–7	Oct 2016	Sweden F5, Falun	Futures	Hard	(Sweden) Fred Simonsson	(Sweden) Markus Eriksson (Sweden) Milos Sekulic	7–6^{(7–1)}, 4–6, [11–9]
Win	21–7	Jan 2017	Germany F1, Schwieberdingen	Futures	Carpet	(Sweden) Patrik Rosenholm	(Russia) Evgeny Karlovskiy (Belarus) Yaraslav Shyla	7–6^{(7–5)}, 3–6, [10–8]
Win	22–7	Mar 2017	Canada F2, Sherbrooke	Futures	Hard (i)	(Denmark) Frederik Nielsen	(Latvia) Miķelis Lībietis (France) Hugo Nys	6–0, 6–4
Win	23–7	Apr 2017	Turkey F14, Antalya	Futures	Clay	(Turkey) Anıl Yüksel	(Chile) Juan Carlos Sáez (Ukraine) Volodymyr Uzhylovskyi	6–4, 6–0
Win	24–7	Apr 2017	Turkey F15, Antalya	Futures	Clay	(Brazil) Pedro Sakamoto	(Turkey) Sarp Ağabigün (Turkey) Altuğ Çelikbilek	6–3, 6–3
Win	25–7	May 2017	Sweden F2, Båstad	Futures	Clay	(Sweden) Fred Simonsson	(Portugal) Fred Gil (Spain) Mario Vilella Martínez	6–3, 3–6, [10–8]

== Davis Cup ==
=== Participations: (2–11) ===
Group membership World Group (0–0) WG play-off (0–0) Group I (1–10) Group II (1–1) Group III (0–0) Group IV (0–0)	Matches by surface Hard (2–8) Clay (0–3) Grass (0–0) Carpet (0–0)	Matches by type Singles (2–8) Doubles (0–3)

- ▲ ▼ indicates the outcome of the Davis Cup match followed by the score, date, place of event, the zonal classification and its phase, and the court surface.

Rubber outcome	No.	Rubber	Match type (partner if any)	Opponent nation	Opponent player(s)	Score
▼2–3; 5–7 April 2013; Megaron Tennis Club, Dnipropetrovsk, Ukraine; Europe/Africa second round; hard (indoor) surface
Defeat	1	I	Singles	Ukraine	Alexandr Dolgopolov	2–6, 0–6, 6–7^{(5–7)}
Defeat	2	V	Singles	Ukraine	Sergiy Stakhovsky	2–6, 3–6, 5–7
▼2–3; 13–15 September 2013; Aegon Arena, Bratislava, Slovakia; Europe/Africa relegation play-off first round; hard (indoor) surface
Defeat	3	I	Singles	Slovakia	Andrej Martin	2–6, 3–6, 4–6
Defeat	4	V	Singles	Slovakia	Lukáš Lacko	2–6, 3–6, 3–6
▼1–3; 12–14 September 2014; Arenele BNR, Bucharest, Romania; Europe/Africa relegation play-off first round; clay surface
Defeat	5	III	Doubles (with Johan Brunström)	Romania	Florin Mergea / Horia Tecău	6–7^{(2–7)}, 6–7^{(5–7)}, 3–6
▼0–5; 4–6 March 2016; Kazan Tennis Academy, Kazan, Russia; Europe/Africa first round; hard (indoor) surface
Defeat	6	I	Singles	Russia	Andrey Kuznetsov	6–4, 1–6, 1–6, 4–6
Defeat	7	IV	Singles (dead rubber)	Russia	Teymuraz Gabashvili	4–6, 0–6
▼0–5; 16–18 September 2016; Båstad tennisstadion, Båstad, Sweden; Europe/Africa relegation play first round; clay surface
Defeat	8	III	Doubles (with Fred Simonsson)	Netherlands	Robin Haase / Jean-Julien Rojer	5–7, 2–6, 3–6
Defeat	9	IV	Singles (dead rubber)	Netherlands	Robin Haase	2–6, 4–6
▼1–3; 28–30 October 2016; Canada Stadium, Ramat HaSharon, Israel; Europe/Africa relegation play second round; hard surface
Defeat	10	III	Doubles (with Johan Brunström)	Israel	Jonathan Erlich / Dudi Sela	4–6, 6–7^{(5–7)}, 6–4, 1–6
Victory	11	IV	Singles (dead rubber)	Israel	Edan Leshem	5–7, 6–3, 6–2
▲3–2; 3–5 February 2017; Tunis, Tunisia; Europe/Africa first round; hard surface
Defeat	12	I	Singles	Tunisia	Malek Jaziri	4–6, 5–7, 2–6
Victory	13	V	Singles	Tunisia	Aziz Dougaz	6–7^{(7–9)}, 6–2, 6–1, 3–6, 6–3

== See also ==
- List of Sweden Davis Cup team representatives
