= Markus Eriksson (tennis) =

Swedish tennis player

- Full name: Markus Eriksson
- Country (sports): Sweden
- Residence: Gothenburg, Sweden
- Born: 29 November 1989 (age 36) Gothenburg, Sweden
- Height: 1.88 m (6 ft 2 in)
- Retired: 2021
- Plays: Right-handed (two handed-backhand)
- Coach: Fredrik Rosengren
- Prize money: $230,264

Singles
- Career record: 6–13 (at ATP Tour level, Grand Slam level, and in Davis Cup)
- Career titles: 10 ITF
- Highest ranking: No. 277 (19 August 2019)

Doubles
- Career record: 9–11 (at ATP Tour level, Grand Slam level, and in Davis Cup)
- Career titles: 1 Challenger, 33 ITF
- Highest ranking: No. 205 (3 December 2018)
- Last updated on: 1 January 2022.

Markus Eriksson (born 29 November 1989) is a retired Swedish tennis player. Eriksson has a career high ATP singles ranking of 277, achieved on 19 August 2019.

== Tennis career ==
Eriksson made his ATP main draw singles debut at the 2013 Swedish Open where he lost in the first round to Martín Alund. In 2014, he made his debut in the main draw of an ATP doubles event, when he and partner Isak Arvidsson received a wild card at the Swedish Open. They lost in the quarterfinals to the tournament third seeds, Tomasz Bednarek and Henri Kontinen.

In 2012, Eriksson was selected to represent the Swedish Davis Cup team in the World Group Playoffs against Belgium. For the period 2012 to 2020, he played in 14 Davis Cup ties winning 7 of the 16 singles matches and 4 of the 7 doubles matches that he played.

Eriksson won his first ATP Challenger title in the doubles, when he and his compatriot André Göransson won the title at the Tampere challenger, where they beat Ivan Gakhov and Alexander Pavlioutchenkov in the final.

== ATP Challenger and ITF Futures titles ==
=== Singles: 10 ===
Legend
ATP Challenger (0)
ITF Futures (10)

No.	Date	Tournament	Tier	Surface	Opponent	Score
1.	Jun 2013	Marocco F3, Mohammedia	Futures	Clay	(Algeria) Lamine Ouahab	6–2, 6–3
2.	Aug 2013	Denmark F3, Copenhagen	Futures	Clay	(Denmark) Martin Pedersen	6–4, 7–5
3.	Feb 2014	Spain F3, Murcia	Futures	Clay	(Spain) Roberto Carballés Baena	7–6^{(7–2)}, 3–6, 7–5
4.	Sep 2015	Sweden F4, Falun	Futures	Hard	(Slovakia) Adrian Sikora	6–4, 3–6, 6–3
5.	Mar 2016	Italy F3, Sondrio	Futures	Hard	(Poland) Marcin Gawron	6–3, 6–1
6.	Jun 2017	Poland F2, Gdynia	Futures	Clay	(Czech Republic) Robin Staněk	7–5, 6–1
7.	Sep 2017	Hungary F7, Kecskemét	Futures	Clay	(Hungary) Zsombor Piros	4–6, 6–4, 6–3
8.	Sep 2018	Sweden F4, Stockholm	Futures	Hard	(Belgium) Christopher Heyman	6–4, 6–2
9.	May 2019	M15 Karlskrona, Sweden	World Tennis Tour	Clay	(Russia) Ronald Slobodchikov	6–4, 3–6, 6–1
10.	May 2019	M15 Kalmar, Sweden	World Tennis Tour	Clay	(Sweden) Dragoș Nicolae Mădăraș	6–2, 6–2

=== Doubles: 36 ===
Legend
ATP Challenger (1)
ITF Futures / World Tennis Tour (35)

No.	Date	Tournament	Tier	Surface	Partner	Opponents	Score
1.	Sep 2010	Sweden F2, Falun	Futures	Hard	(Sweden) Carl Bergman	(Sweden) Tobias Blomgren (Finland) Micke Kontinen	3–6, 6–3, [10–4]
2.	Jun 2011	Romania F4, Mediaș	Futures	Clay	(Sweden) Jesper Brunström	(Czech Republic) Michal Schmid (Czech Republic) Jiří Školoudík	6–2, 6–2
3.	Sep 2011	Sweden F4, Uppsala	Futures	Hard	(Sweden) Carl Bergman	(United Kingdom) Lewis Burton (United Kingdom) James Marsalek	6–3, 6–4
4.	Sep 2012	Sweden F6, Falun	Futures	Hard	(Sweden) Jesper Brunström	(Sweden) Filip Bergevi (Sweden) Fred Simonsson	6–4, 7–5
5.	Mar 2013	Turkey F10, Antalya	Futures	Clay	(Sweden) Jesper Brunström	(Russia) Andrei Plotniy (Kazakhstan) Denis Yevseyev	6–3, 6–1
6.	Jan 2014	USA F3, Weston, Florida	Futures	Clay	(Sweden) Milos Sekulic	(United States) Jason Jung (United States) Evan King	6–7^{(5–7)}, 7–6^{(7–4)}, [17–15]
7.	Feb 2014	USA F4, Palm Coast, Florida	Futures	Clay	(Sweden) Milos Sekulic	(United States) Taylor Fritz (United States) Martin Redlicki	6–1, 6–1
8.	Feb 2014	Spain F3, Murcia	Futures	Clay	(Sweden) Milos Sekulic	(Spain) Sergio Gutiérrez Ferrol (Spain) David Vega Hernández	6–0, 7–6^{(7–5)}
9.	Mar 2014	France F6, Poitiers	Futures	Hard	(Sweden) Isak Arvidsson	(Belgium) Niels Desein (Belgium) Yannick Mertens	w/o
10.	May 2014	Sweden F2, Båstad	Futures	Clay	(Sweden) Isak Arvidsson	(Sweden) Jacob Adaktusson (Sweden) Robin Olin	6–2, 4–6, [10–6]
11.	May 2014	Sweden F3, Båstad	Futures	Clay	(Sweden) Isak Arvidsson	(Finland) Timi Kivijarvi (Finland) Henrik Sillanpää	6–4, 6–2
12.	Mar 2015	Croatia F4, Poreč	Futures	Clay	(Sweden) Christian Lindell	(Romania) Alexandru-Daniel Carpen (Croatia) Tomislav Draganja	6–1, 6–4
13.	Nov 2015	Turkey F46, Antalya	Futures	Clay	(Russia) Ivan Gakhov	(Italy) Daniele Capecchi (Italy) Federico Maccari	6–4, 7–6^{(7–3)}
14.	Jan 2016	Tunisia F2, Hammamet	Futures	Clay	(Italy) Matteo Volante	(North Macedonia) Tomislav Jotovski (Serbia) Miljan Zekić	6–2, 6–1
15.	Mar 2016	Italy F3, Sondrio	Futures	Hard	(Brazil) Wilson Leite	(France) Antoine Hoang (France) Grégoire Jacq	6–4, 7–6^{(7–5)}
16.	May 2016	Sweden F3, Baståd	Futures	Clay	(Sweden) Milos Sekulic	(Belgium) Julien Cagnina (Belgium) Omar Salman	6–2, 6–3
17.	Jun 2016	Italy F15, Sassuolo	Futures	Clay	(Sweden) Milos Sekulic	(Italy) Filippo Baldi (Italy) Pietro Licciardi	6–4, 6–3
18.	Mar 2017	Bahrain F1, Manama	Futures	Hard	(Sweden) Milos Sekulic	(Philippines) Francis Alcantara (Zimbabwe) Benjamin Lock	6–3, 6–1
19.	Apr 2017	Qatar F2, Doha	Futures	Hard	(Sweden) Milos Sekulic	(France) Daniel Altmaier (Austria) Lucas Miedler	7–5, 3–6. [10–7]
20.	Sep 2017	Sweden F3, Jönköping	Futures	Hard	(Sweden) Milos Sekulic	(Netherlands) Kevin Griekspoor (Netherlands) Tallon Griekspoor	6–0, 6–2
21.	Dec 2017	Qatar F5, Doha	Futures	Hard	(Turkey) Tuna Altuna	(Russia) Aslan Karatsev (Croatia) Fran Zvonimir Zgombić	6–1, 6–2
22.	Apr 2018	Nigeria F1, Abuja	Futures	Hard	(Austria) Maximilian Neuchrist	(France) Rémi Boutillier (France) Tom Jomby	6–3, 4–6, [15–13]
23.	May 2018	Sweden F1, Karlskrona	Futures	Clay	(Sweden) Fred Simonsson	(Finland) Otto Virtanen (Germany) Louis Wessels	6–1, 1–6, [10–5]
1.	Jul 2018	Tampere, Finland	Challenger	Clay	(Sweden) André Göransson	(Russia) Ivan Gakhov (Russia) Alexander Pavlioutchenkov	6–3, 3–6, [10–7]
24.	Sep 2018	Sweden F4, Stockholm	Futures	Hard	(Sweden) Fred Simonsson	(Switzerland) Antoine Bellier (Germany) Johannes Härteis	2–6, 6–4, [10–8]
25.	Nov 2018	Vietnam F5, Tây Ninh	Futures	Hard	(Philippines) Francis Alcantara	(Vietnam) Lý Hoàng Nam (Russia) Roman Safiullin	5–7, 6–4, [10–7]
26.	Mar 2019	M15 Rovinj, Croatia	World Tennis Tour	Clay	(Belgium) Jeroen Vanneste	(Croatia) Ivan Sabanov (Croatia) Matej Sabanov	7–5, 6–2
27.	Apr 2019	M15 Tabarka, Tunisia	World Tennis Tour	Clay	(Sweden) Filip Bergevi	(Republic of Ireland) Simon Carr (France) Amaury Delmas	6–3, 6–1
28.	May 2019	M15 Karlskrona, Sweden	World Tennis Tour	Clay	(Sweden) Filip Bergevi	(United States) Justin Butsch (Sweden) Simon Freund	6–1, 6–3
29.	May 2019	M15 Kalmar, Sweden	World Tennis Tour	Clay	(Sweden) Filip Bergevi	(United States) Justin Butsch (Sweden) Simon Freund	7–5, 6–2
30.	May 2019	M25 Arlon, Belgium	World Tennis Tour	Clay	(Belgium) Jeroen Vanneste	(Argentina) Facundo Mena (Belgium) Martin van der Meerschen	6–2, 6–2
31.	Oct 2020	M25 Hamburg, Germany	World Tennis Tour	Hard (i)	(Norway) Viktor Durasovic	(Italy) Raúl Brancaccio (Netherlands) Mark Vervoort	6–3, 5–7, [11–9]
32.	Jun 2021	M25 Bourg-en-Bresse, France	World Tennis Tour	Clay	(Switzerland) Jakub Paul	(Switzerland) Leandro Riedi (Switzerland) Damien Wenger	7–6^{(8–6)}, 6–7^{(3–7)}, [10–4]
33.	Aug 2021	M15 Łódź, Poland	World Tennis Tour	Clay	(Sweden) Filip Bergevi	(Latvia) Kārlis Ozoliņš (Greece) Aristotelis Thanos	4–6, 6–2, [10–4]
34.	Aug 2021	M25 Poznań, Poland	World Tennis Tour	Clay	(Sweden) Filip Bergevi	(Argentina) Leonardo Aboian (Argentina) Valerio Aboian	w/o
35.	Nov 2021	M15 Heraklion, Greece	World Tennis Tour	Hard	(Australia) Matthew Romios	(Hungary) Péter Fajta (Hungary) Zsombor Velcz	3–6, 7–6^{(7–5)}, [10–0]
