= 2017 Swedish Open – Women's doubles =

Women's doubles
- 2017 Swedish Open

Final
- Champion: (Netherlands) Quirine Lemoine (Netherlands) Arantxa Rus
- Runner-up: (Argentina) María Irigoyen (Czech Republic) Barbora Krejčíková
- Score: 3–6, 6–3, [10–8]

Details
- Draw: 16
- Seeds: 4

Events
Singles	men	women
Doubles	men	women
- Swedish Open

Andreea Mitu and Alicja Rosolska were the defending champions, but Mitu chose not to participate this year. Rosolska played alongside Oksana Kalashnikova, but lost in the semifinals to Quirine Lemoine and Arantxa Rus.

Lemoine and Rus went on to win the title, defeating María Irigoyen and Barbora Krejčíková in the final 3–6, 6–3, [10–8].

== Seeds ==
1. (United States) Nicole Melichar / (United Kingdom) Anna Smith (first round)
2. (Georgia (country)) Oksana Kalashnikova / (Poland) Alicja Rosolska (semifinals)
3. (Belgium) Elise Mertens / (Netherlands) Demi Schuurs (first round)
4. (Argentina) María Irigoyen / (Czech Republic) Barbora Krejčíková (final)

== Draw ==
Key

- Q = Qualifier
- WC = Wild card
- LL = Lucky loser
- Alt = Alternate
- ITF = ITF entry
- PR = Protected ranking
- SR = Special ranking
- SE = Special exempt
- JE = Junior exempt
- JR = Junior Accelerator Programme entrant
- CO = College Accelerator Programme entrant
- NG = Next Gen Accelerator Program entrant
- w/o = Walkover
- r = Retired
- d = Defaulted

=== Draw ===
First round
1	(United States) N Melichar (United Kingdom) A Smith	6	1	[5]
(Switzerland) X Knoll (Serbia) A Krunić	4	6	[10]
Alt	(Sweden) E Allgurin (Denmark) K Barritza	6	3	[10]
WC	(Sweden) M Björklund (Sweden) I Jarlskog	2	6	[4]
4	(Argentina) M Irigoyen (Czech Republic) B Krejčíková	6	6
(Germany) M Barthel (Sweden) J Larsson	3	2
(Russia) A Blinkova (Belarus) L Marozava	6	1	[6]
(Germany) N Geuer (Sweden) R Peterson	2	6	[10]
(Sweden) C Lister (Bulgaria) A Naydenova	6	6
WC	(Sweden) J Cabaj Awad (Sweden) K Rinaldo Persson	2	3
(Netherlands) Q Lemoine (Netherlands) A Rus	6	5	[10]
3	(Belgium) E Mertens (Netherlands) D Schuurs	2	7	[7]
(Spain) S Soler Espinosa (Germany) A Zaja	4	2
(Australia) J Moore (India) P Thombare	6	6
(Romania) I Bara (Thailand) V Wongteanchai	2	6	[7]
2	(Georgia (country)) O Kalashnikova (Poland) A Rosolska	6	3	[10]

Quarterfinals
(Switzerland) X Knoll (Serbia) A Krunić	6	6
Alt	(Sweden) E Allgurin (Denmark) K Barritza	1	3
4	(Argentina) M Irigoyen (Czech Republic) B Krejčíková	6	6^{4}	[10]
(Germany) N Geuer (Sweden) R Peterson	2	7^{7}	[6]
(Sweden) C Lister (Bulgaria) A Naydenova	5	2
(Netherlands) Q Lemoine (Netherlands) A Rus	7	6
(Australia) J Moore (India) P Thombare	3	2
2	(Georgia (country)) O Kalashnikova (Poland) A Rosolska	6	6

Semifinals
(Switzerland) X Knoll (Serbia) A Krunić	0	6	[4]
4	(Argentina) M Irigoyen (Czech Republic) B Krejčíková	6	1	[10]
(Netherlands) Q Lemoine (Netherlands) A Rus	7^{7}	6
2	(Georgia (country)) O Kalashnikova (Poland) A Rosolska	6^{3}	2

Final
4	(Argentina) M Irigoyen (Czech Republic) B Krejčíková	6	3	[8]
(Netherlands) Q Lemoine (Netherlands) A Rus	3	6	[10]
