= 2018 Swedish Open – Doubles =

Doubles
- 2018 Swedish Open

Final
- Champions: (Chile) Julio Peralta (Argentina) Horacio Zeballos
- Runners-up: (Italy) Simone Bolelli (Italy) Fabio Fognini
- Score: 6–3, 6–4

Events
Singles	Doubles
← 2017 ·	Swedish Open	· 2019 →

Julian Knowle and Philipp Petzschner were the defending champions, but Knowle chose not to participate this year. Petzschner played alongside Jürgen Melzer, but lost in the semifinals to Julio Peralta and Horacio Zeballos.

Peralta and Zeballos went on to win the title, defeating Simone Bolelli and Fabio Fognini in the final, 6–3, 6–4.

== Seeds ==
1. (Belarus) Max Mirnyi / (Austria) Philipp Oswald (semifinals)
2. (Chile) Julio Peralta / (Argentina) Horacio Zeballos (champions)
3. (New Zealand) Marcus Daniell / (Netherlands) Wesley Koolhof (quarterfinals)
4. (Spain) David Marrero / (Pakistan) Aisam-ul-Haq Qureshi (first round)

== Draw ==
=== Key ===
- Q = Qualifier
- WC = Wild card
- LL = Lucky loser
- Alt = Alternate
- SE = Special exempt
- PR = Protected ranking
- ITF = ITF entry
- JE = Junior exempt
- w/o = Walkover
- r = Retired
- d = Defaulted
- SR = Special ranking

=== Draw ===
First round
1	(Belarus) M Mirnyi (Austria) P Oswald	6	1	[10]
(Spain) R Carballés Baena (Argentina) F Delbonis	3	6	[8]
(Brazil) F Neis (Brazil) F Romboli	7	6
WC	(Sweden) M Eriksson (Sweden) A Siljeström	5	4
4	(Spain) D Marrero (Pakistan) A-u-H Qureshi	4	4
(Spain) M López (Spain) J Munar	6	6
(Italy) S Bolelli (Italy) F Fognini	6	6
(Argentina) L Mayer (Argentina) A Molteni	2	4
PR	(Austria) J Melzer (Germany) P Petzschner	5	6	[10]
(India) S Balaji (India) V Vardhan	7	4	[8]
WC	(Sweden) E Ymer (Sweden) M Ymer	1	2
3	(New Zealand) M Daniell (Netherlands) W Koolhof	6	6
(Chinese Taipei) H-y Peng (South Africa) R Roelofse	2	4
(Moldova) R Albot (Uzbekistan) D Istomin	6	6
(Belgium) S Gillé (Belgium) J Vliegen	6	3	[7]
2	(Chile) J Peralta (Argentina) H Zeballos	4	6	[10]

Quarterfinals
1	(Belarus) M Mirnyi (Austria) P Oswald	6	6
(Brazil) F Neis (Brazil) F Romboli	3	3
(Spain) M López (Spain) J Munar	0	3
(Italy) S Bolelli (Italy) F Fognini	6	6
PR	(Austria) J Melzer (Germany) P Petzschner	7^{7}	6
3	(New Zealand) M Daniell (Netherlands) W Koolhof	6^{4}	3
(Moldova) R Albot (Uzbekistan) D Istomin	1	3
2	(Chile) J Peralta (Argentina) H Zeballos	6	6

Semifinals
1	(Belarus) M Mirnyi (Austria) P Oswald	3	6	[4]
(Italy) S Bolelli (Italy) F Fognini	6	4	[10]
PR	(Austria) J Melzer (Germany) P Petzschner	3	2
2	(Chile) J Peralta (Argentina) H Zeballos	6	6

Final
(Italy) S Bolelli (Italy) F Fognini	3	4
2	(Chile) J Peralta (Argentina) H Zeballos	6	6
