= 2017 Swedish Open – Women's singles =

Women's singles
- 2017 Swedish Open

Final
- Champion: (Czech Republic) Kateřina Siniaková
- Runner-up: (Denmark) Caroline Wozniacki
- Score: 6–3, 6–4

Details
- Draw: 32
- Seeds: 8

Events
Singles	men	women
Doubles	men	women
- Swedish Open

Laura Siegemund was the defending champion, but could not defend her title due to a right knee injury.

Seventh-seeded Kateřina Siniaková won the title, defeating Caroline Wozniacki in the final, 6–3, 6–4.

== Seeds ==
1. (Denmark) Caroline Wozniacki (final)
2. (Latvia) Anastasija Sevastova (quarterfinals)
3. (France) Caroline Garcia (semifinals)
4. (Estonia) Anett Kontaveit (withdrew)
5. (Spain) Carla Suárez Navarro (second round)
6. (Netherlands) Kiki Bertens (second round, withdrew)
7. (Czech Republic) Kateřina Siniaková (champion)
8. (Germany) Julia Görges (first round, retired)
9. (Sweden) Johanna Larsson (first round)

== Draw ==
Key

- Q = Qualifier
- WC = Wild card
- LL = Lucky loser
- Alt = Alternate
- ITF = ITF entry
- PR = Protected ranking
- SR = Special ranking
- SE = Special exempt
- JE = Junior exempt
- JR = Junior Accelerator Programme entrant
- CO = College Accelerator Programme entrant
- NG = Next Gen Accelerator Program entrant
- w/o = Walkover
- r = Retired
- d = Defaulted

=== Finals ===
Semifinals
1	(Denmark) Caroline Wozniacki	7	4	6
(Belgium) Elise Mertens	5	6	2
3	(France) Caroline Garcia	2	5
7	(Czech Republic) Kateřina Siniaková	6	7

Final
1	(Denmark) Caroline Wozniacki	3	4
7	(Czech Republic) Kateřina Siniaková	6	6

=== Top half ===
First round
1	(Denmark) C Wozniacki	6	3	6
(France) P Parmentier	3	6	2
Q	(Italy) M Trevisan	4	3
(Switzerland) V Golubic	6	6
Q	(Ukraine) K Kozlova	3	6	7^{7}
WC	(Sweden) M Björklund	6	2	6^{4}
(Germany) M Barthel	6^{3}	7	7^{7}
9	(Sweden) J Larsson	7^{7}	5	6^{4}
5	(Spain) C Suárez Navarro	6	6
(Italy) J Paolini	1	0
Q	(Romania) I Bara	2	6	2
(Belgium) E Mertens	6	4	6
(Serbia) A Krunić	6	6
Q	(Sweden) C Lister	1	2
LL	(Bulgaria) V Tomova	6	2
8	(Germany) J Görges	4	2^{r}

Second round
1	(Denmark) C Wozniacki	6	2	6
(Switzerland) V Golubic	2	6	4
Q	(Ukraine) K Kozlova	6	6
(Germany) M Barthel	3	3
5	(Spain) C Suárez Navarro	3	7^{7}	5
(Belgium) E Mertens	6	6^{2}	7
(Serbia) A Krunić	7	6
LL	(Bulgaria) V Tomova	5	4

Quarterfinals
1	(Denmark) C Wozniacki	6	6
Q	(Ukraine) K Kozlova	3	1
(Belgium) E Mertens	6	2	6
(Serbia) A Krunić	4	6	4

Semifinals
1	(Denmark) C Wozniacki	7	4	6
(Belgium) E Mertens	5	6	2

=== Bottom half ===
First round
6	(Netherlands) K Bertens	6	6
(Germany) C Witthöft	1	4
Q	(Czech Republic) B Krejčíková	6	6
(Germany) A Beck	0	0
(Germany) T Korpatsch	6^{11}	2
(Italy) S Errani	7^{13}	6
(Romania) I-C Begu	7	3	4
3	(France) C Garcia	5	6	6
7	(Czech Republic) K Siniaková	6	3	6
WC	(Sweden) R Peterson	3	6	1
(Romania) PM Țig	2	3
Q	(Netherlands) A Rus	6	6
(Russia) E Alexandrova	4	6	6^{5}
WC	(Russia) E Kulichkova	6	4	7^{7}
(Russia) A Blinkova	3	1
2	(Latvia) A Sevastova	6	6

Second round
6	(Netherlands) K Bertens
Q	(Czech Republic) B Krejčíková	w/o
(Italy) S Errani	1	0
3	(France) C Garcia	6	6
7	(Czech Republic) K Siniaková	7^{7}	6
Q	(Netherlands) A Rus	6^{3}	4
WC	(Russia) E Kulichkova	2	3
2	(Latvia) A Sevastova	6	6

Quarterfinals
Q	(Czech Republic) B Krejčíková	2	6	5
3	(France) C Garcia	6	4	7
7	(Czech Republic) K Siniaková	6	5	7
2	(Latvia) A Sevastova	3	7	5

Semifinals
3	(France) C Garcia	2	5
7	(Czech Republic) K Siniaková	6	7

== Qualifying ==
=== Seeds ===
1. (Ukraine) Kateryna Kozlova (qualified)
2. (Montenegro) Danka Kovinić (first round, retired)
3. (Czech Republic) Barbora Krejčíková (qualified)
4. (Netherlands) Arantxa Rus (qualified)
5. (Netherlands) Quirine Lemoine (qualifying competition)
6. (Italy) Martina Trevisan (qualified)
7. (Bulgaria) Viktoriya Tomova (qualifying competition, lucky loser)
8. (United States) Louisa Chirico (qualifying competition)
9. (Russia) Polina Monova (first round)
10. (Romania) Alexandra Cadanțu (first round, retired)
11. (Turkey) Başak Eraydın (qualifying competition)
12. (Spain) Sílvia Soler Espinosa (qualifying competition)

=== Qualifiers ===
1. (Ukraine) Kateryna Kozlova
2. (Sweden) Cornelia Lister
3. (Czech Republic) Barbora Krejčíková
4. (Netherlands) Arantxa Rus
5. (Romania) Irina Bara
6. (Italy) Martina Trevisan

=== Lucky loser ===
1. (Bulgaria) Viktoriya Tomova

=== Draw ===
==== First qualifier ====
First round
1	(Ukraine) Kateryna Kozlova	6	6
(Denmark) Karen Barritza	1	2
(France) Alizé Lim	6	2	2
11	(Turkey) Başak Eraydın	0	6	6

Qualifying competition
1	(Ukraine) Kateryna Kozlova	6	6
11	(Turkey) Başak Eraydın	3	1

==== Second qualifier ====
First round
2	(Montenegro) Danka Kovinić	6	3	2^{r}
WC	(Sweden) Cornelia Lister	3	6	4
(Serbia) Dejana Radanović	5	4
8	(United States) Louisa Chirico	7	6

Qualifying competition
WC	(Sweden) Cornelia Lister	6	2	6
8	(United States) Louisa Chirico	4	6	4

==== Third qualifier ====
First round
3	(Czech Republic) Barbora Krejčíková	6	3	6
(Germany) Anna Zaja	0	6	4
WC	(Sweden) Ida Jarlskog	2	1
12	(Spain) Sílvia Soler Espinosa	6	6

Qualifying competition
3	(Czech Republic) Barbora Krejčíková	6	6
12	(Spain) Sílvia Soler Espinosa	0	2

==== Fourth qualifier ====
First round
4	(Netherlands) Arantxa Rus	6	6
(Bulgaria) Aleksandrina Naydenova	4	2
WC	(Sweden) Ellen Allgurin	6	6
9	(Russia) Polina Monova	1	2

Qualifying competition
4	(Netherlands) Arantxa Rus	6	6
WC	(Sweden) Ellen Allgurin	2	0

==== Fifth qualifier ====
First round
5	(Netherlands) Quirine Lemoine	6	6
(Thailand) Varatchaya Wongteanchai	3	1
(Romania) Irina Bara	6	3
10	(Romania) Alexandra Cadanțu	2	0^{r}

Qualifying competition
5	(Netherlands) Quirine Lemoine	4	6^{3}
(Romania) Irina Bara	6	7^{7}

==== Sixth qualifier ====
First round
6	(Italy) Martina Trevisan	6	6
WC	(Sweden) Kajsa Rinaldo Persson	4	1
(Australia) Jessica Moore	7	4	1
7	(Bulgaria) Viktoriya Tomova	5	6	6

Qualifying competition
6	(Italy) Martina Trevisan	6	7^{7}
7	(Bulgaria) Viktoriya Tomova	3	6^{5}
