= 2018 Swedish Open – Singles =

Singles
- 2018 Swedish Open

Final
- Champion: (Italy) Fabio Fognini
- Runner-up: (France) Richard Gasquet
- Score: 6–3, 3–6, 6–1

Details
- Draw: 28
- Seeds: 8

Events
Singles	Doubles
← 2017 ·	Swedish Open	· 2019 →

David Ferrer was the defending champion, but lost in the second round to Casper Ruud.

Fabio Fognini won the title, defeating Richard Gasquet in the final, 6–3, 3–6, 6–1.

== Seeds ==
The top four seeds receive a bye into the second round.

1. (Argentina) Diego Schwartzman (second round)
2. (Spain) Pablo Carreño Busta (quarterfinals)
3. (Italy) Fabio Fognini (champion)
4. (France) Richard Gasquet (final)
5. (Spain) Fernando Verdasco (semifinals)
6. (Argentina) Leonardo Mayer (first round)
7. (Spain) David Ferrer (second round)
8. (Australia) John Millman (second round)

== Draw ==
=== Key ===
- Q = Qualifier
- WC = Wild card
- LL = Lucky loser
- Alt = Alternate
- ITF = ITF entry
- PR = Protected ranking
- SR = Special ranking
- SE = Special exempt
- JE = Junior exempt
- JR = Junior Accelerator Programme entrant
- CO = College Accelerator Programme entrant
- NG = Next Gen Accelerator Program entrant
- w/o = Walkover
- r = Retired
- d = Defaulted

=== Finals ===
Semifinals
LL	(Switzerland) Henri Laaksonen	2	3
4	(France) Richard Gasquet	6	6
3	(Italy) Fabio Fognini	6	4	7
5	(Spain) Fernando Verdasco	1	6	5

Final
4	(France) Richard Gasquet	3	6	1
3	(Italy) Fabio Fognini	6	3	6

=== Top half ===
First round
(Spain) R Carballés Baena	6	3	4
Q	(Italy) S Bolelli	4	6	6
Q	(Argentina) JI Londero	3	6	5
LL	(Switzerland) H Laaksonen	6	4	7
(Italy) M Berrettini	3	6	6
6	(Argentina) L Mayer	6	3	4
(Austria) G Melzer	6	6
Q	(France) C Moutet	1	1
WC	(Spain) J Munar	7^{9}	4	0
WC	(Norway) C Ruud	6^{7}	6	6
Q	(Czech Republic) Z Kolář	2	5
7	(Spain) D Ferrer	6	7

Second round
1	(Argentina) D Schwartzman	6^{8}	3
Q	(Italy) S Bolelli	7^{10}	6
LL	(Switzerland) H Laaksonen	6	6
(Italy) M Berrettini	2	2
4	(France) R Gasquet	1	6	6
(Austria) G Melzer	6	3	1
WC	(Norway) C Ruud	7	6
7	(Spain) D Ferrer	5	2

Quarterfinals
Q	(Italy) S Bolelli	6	2	4
LL	(Switzerland) H Laaksonen	3	6	6
4	(France) R Gasquet	7^{7}	6
WC	(Norway) C Ruud	6^{4}	2

Semifinals
LL	(Switzerland) H Laaksonen	2	3
4	(France) R Gasquet	6	6

=== Bottom half ===
First round
8	(Australia) J Millman	6	6
(Argentina) G Andreozzi	0	2
(Argentina) H Zeballos	7^{7}	2	2
(Argentina) F Delbonis	6^{2}	6	6
(Uzbekistan) D Istomin	3	3
WC	(Sweden) M Ymer	6	6
5	(Spain) F Verdasco	6	3	6
(Italy) L Sonego	4	6	1
(Moldova) R Albot	4	3
(Portugal) P Sousa	6	6
(Brazil) T Monteiro	6	6
(Sweden) E Ymer	4	2

Second round
8	(Australia) J Millman	4	4
(Argentina) F Delbonis	6	6
WC	(Sweden) M Ymer	6	4	2
3	(Italy) F Fognini	1	6	6
5	(Spain) F Verdasco	6	6
(Portugal) P Sousa	3	2
(Brazil) T Monteiro	4	3
2	(Spain) P Carreño Busta	6	6

Quarterfinals
(Argentina) F Delbonis	4	3
3	(Italy) F Fognini	6	6
5	(Spain) F Verdasco	6	6
2	(Spain) P Carreño Busta	4	2

Semifinals
3	(Italy) F Fognini	6	4	7
5	(Spain) F Verdasco	1	6	5

== Qualifying ==
=== Seeds ===
1. (France) Corentin Moutet (qualified)
2. (Switzerland) Henri Laaksonen (qualifying competition, lucky loser)
3. (France) Calvin Hemery (qualifying competition)
4. (Italy) Simone Bolelli (qualified)
5. (Chile) Cristian Garín (qualifying competition)
6. (Argentina) Juan Ignacio Londero (qualified)
7. (Croatia) Viktor Galović (qualifying competition)
8. (Czech Republic) Zdeněk Kolář (qualified)

=== Qualifiers ===
1. (France) Corentin Moutet
2. (Argentina) Juan Ignacio Londero
3. (Czech Republic) Zdeněk Kolář
4. (Italy) Simone Bolelli

=== Lucky loser ===
1. (Switzerland) Henri Laaksonen

=== Qualifying draw ===
==== First qualifier ====
First round
1	(France) Corentin Moutet	0	6	6
WC	(Sweden) Markus Eriksson	6	4	2
Alt	(Slovakia) Filip Horanský	3	7	4
5	(Chile) Cristian Garín	6	5	6

Qualifying competition
1	(France) Corentin Moutet	6	4	6
5	(Chile) Cristian Garín	2	6	3

==== Second qualifier ====
First round
2	(Switzerland) Henri Laaksonen	4	6	6
PR	(Colombia) Santiago Giraldo	6	2	4
(Serbia) Miljan Zekić	4	0
6	(Argentina) Juan Ignacio Londero	6	6

Qualifying competition
2	(Switzerland) Henri Laaksonen	6^{6}	4
6	(Argentina) Juan Ignacio Londero	7^{8}	6

==== Third qualifier ====
First round
3	(France) Calvin Hemery	7^{7}	6
WC	(Germany) Rudolf Molleker	6^{4}	3
(Spain) Daniel Muñoz de la Nava	2	2
8/Alt	(Czech Republic) Zdeněk Kolář	6	6

Qualifying competition
3	(France) Calvin Hemery	2	1
8/Alt	(Czech Republic) Zdeněk Kolář	6	6

==== Fourth qualifier ====
First round
4	(Italy) Simone Bolelli	6	6
(Spain) Pedro Martínez	2	3
PR	(Spain) Nicolás Almagro	2	6^{3}
7	(Croatia) Viktor Galović	6	7^{7}

Qualifying competition
4	(Italy) Simone Bolelli	6	6
7	(Croatia) Viktor Galović	4	2
