= 2017 Swedish Open =

- Date: 17–23 July (men); 24–30 July (women)
- Edition: 70th (men); 9th (women)
- Surface: Clay
- Venue: Båstad Tennis Stadium

Champions

Men's singles
- (Spain) David Ferrer

Women's singles
- (Czech Republic) Kateřina Siniaková

Men's doubles
- (Austria) Julian Knowle / (Germany) Philipp Petzschner

Women's doubles
- (Netherlands) Quirine Lemoine / (Netherlands) Arantxa Rus
← 2016 ·	Swedish Open	· 2018 →

The 2017 Swedish Open was a tennis tournament played on outdoor clay courts as part of the ATP World Tour 250 Series of the 2017 ATP World Tour and as part of the International Series on the 2017 WTA Tour. It took place in Båstad, Sweden, from 17 through 23 July 2017 for the men's tournament, and from 24 through 30 July 2017 for the women's tournament. It is also known as the 2017 SkiStar Swedish Open for the men and the 2017 Ericsson Open for the women for sponsorship reasons. It was the 70th edition of the event for the men and the 9th edition for the women.

== Finals ==
=== Men's singles ===
- (Spain) David Ferrer defeated (Ukraine) Alexandr Dolgopolov, 6–4, 6–4

=== Women's singles ===
- (Czech Republic) Kateřina Siniaková defeated (Denmark) Caroline Wozniacki, 6–3, 6–4

=== Men's doubles ===
- (Austria) Julian Knowle / (Germany) Philipp Petzschner defeated (Netherlands) Sander Arends / (Netherlands) Matwé Middelkoop, 6–2, 3–6, [10–7]

=== Women's doubles ===
- (Netherlands) Quirine Lemoine / (Netherlands) Arantxa Rus defeated (Argentina) María Irigoyen / (Czech Republic) Barbora Krejčíková, 3–6, 6–3, [10–8]

== Points and prize money ==
=== Point distribution ===
Event	W	F	SF	QF	Round of 16	Round of 32	Q	Q2	Q1
Men's singles	250	150	90	45	20	0	12	6	0
Men's doubles	250	150	90	45	0	—	—	—	—
Women's singles	280	180	110	60	30	1	18	12	1
Women's doubles	280	180	110	60	1	—	—	—	—

=== Prize money ===
Event	W	F	SF	QF	Round of 16	Round of 32^{1}	Q2	Q1
Men's singles	€85,945	€45,265	€24,520	€13,970	€8,230	€4,875	€2,195	€1,100
Men's doubles *	€26,110	€13,730	€7,440	€4,260	€2,490	—	—	—
Women's singles	$43,000	$21,400	$11,500	$6,175	$3,400	$2,100	$1,020	$600
Women's doubles *	$12,300	$6,400	$3,435	$1,820	$960	—	—	—

_{^{1} Qualifiers prize money is also the Round of 32 prize money}
_{* per team}

== ATP singles main-draw entrants ==
=== Seeds ===
Country	Player	Rank^{1}	Seed
ESP	Pablo Carreño Busta	17	1
ESP	Albert Ramos Viñolas	22	2
URU	Pablo Cuevas	24	3
~~FRA~~	~~Richard Gasquet~~	~~27~~	~~4~~
RUS	Karen Khachanov	34	5
ESP	Fernando Verdasco	35	6
ARG	Diego Schwartzman	37	7
ESP	David Ferrer	39	8
ARG	Horacio Zeballos	56	9

- ^{1} Rankings are as of July 3, 2017

=== Other entrants ===
The following players received wildcards into the singles main draw:

- (Germany) Tommy Haas
- (Sweden) Elias Ymer
- (Sweden) Mikael Ymer

The following player received entry using a protected ranking:

- (Latvia) Ernests Gulbis

The following players received entry from the qualifying draw:

- (Belgium) Arthur De Greef
- (Argentina) Federico Delbonis
- (Germany) Maximilian Marterer
- (Argentina) Leonardo Mayer

The following player received entry as a lucky loser:

- (France) Paul-Henri Mathieu

=== Withdrawals ===
Before the tournament

- (Spain) Nicolás Almagro →replaced by (Argentina) Facundo Bagnis
- (France) Jérémy Chardy →replaced by (France) Paul-Henri Mathieu
- (Belgium) Steve Darcis →replaced by (Ukraine) Alexandr Dolgopolov
- (France) Richard Gasquet →replaced by (Switzerland) Henri Laaksonen
- (Serbia) Viktor Troicki →replaced by (Argentina) Renzo Olivo

=== Retirements ===
- (Spain) Pablo Carreño Busta

== ATP doubles main-draw entrants ==
=== Seeds ===
Country	Player	Country	Player	Rank^{1}	Seed
CHI	Julio Peralta	ARG	Horacio Zeballos	71	1
ESP	David Marrero	SRB	Nenad Zimonjić	99	2
NZL	Marcus Daniell	BRA	Marcelo Demoliner	105	3
~~FRA~~	~~Jérémy Chardy~~	~~USA~~	~~Nicholas Monroe~~	~~123~~	~~4~~

- Rankings are as of July 3, 2017

=== Other entrants ===
The following pairs received wildcards into the doubles main draw:

- (Sweden) Johan Brunström / (Sweden) Andreas Siljeström
- (Sweden) Elias Ymer / (Sweden) Mikael Ymer

The following pair received entry as alternates:

- (Sweden) Isak Arvidsson / (Sweden) Fred Simonsson

=== Withdrawals ===
Before the tournament

- (France) Jérémy Chardy

== WTA singles main-draw entrants ==
=== Seeds ===
Country	Player	Rank^{1}	Seed
DEN	Caroline Wozniacki	7	1
LAT	Anastasija Sevastova	17	2
FRA	Caroline Garcia	20	3
~~EST~~	~~Anett Kontaveit~~	~~32~~	~~4~~
ESP	Carla Suárez Navarro	34	5
NED	Kiki Bertens	35	6
CZE	Kateřina Siniaková	44	7
GER	Julia Görges	45	8
SWE	Johanna Larsson	48	9

- ^{1} Rankings are as of July 17, 2017

=== Other entrants ===
The following players received wildcards into the singles main draw:

- (Sweden) Mirjam Björklund
- (Russia) Elizaveta Kulichkova
- (Sweden) Rebecca Peterson

The following players received entry from the qualifying draw:

- (Romania) Irina Bara
- (Ukraine) Kateryna Kozlova
- (Czech Republic) Barbora Krejčíková
- (Sweden) Cornelia Lister
- (Netherlands) Arantxa Rus
- (Italy) Martina Trevisan

The following player received entry as a lucky loser:

- (Bulgaria) Viktoriya Tomova

=== Withdrawals ===
Before the tournament

- (Switzerland) Timea Bacsinszky →replaced by (Russia) Anna Blinkova
- (Romania) Sorana Cîrstea →replaced by (Romania) Patricia Maria Țig
- (Estonia) Anett Kontaveit →replaced by (Bulgaria) Viktoriya Tomova
- (United States) Christina McHale →replaced by (Serbia) Aleksandra Krunić
- (Kazakhstan) Yulia Putintseva →replaced by (Germany) Annika Beck
- (Australia) Samantha Stosur →replaced by (France) Pauline Parmentier

During the tournament

- (Netherlands) Kiki Bertens

=== Retirements ===
- (Germany) Julia Görges

== WTA doubles main-draw entrants ==
=== Seeds ===
Country	Player	Country	Player	Rank^{1}	Seed
USA	Nicole Melichar	GBR	Anna Smith	109	1
GEO	Oksana Kalashnikova	POL	Alicja Rosolska	114	2
BEL	Elise Mertens	NED	Demi Schuurs	118	3
ARG	María Irigoyen	CZE	Barbora Krejčíková	148	4

- ^{1} Rankings are as of July 17, 2017

=== Other entrants ===
The following pairs received wildcards into the doubles main draw:

- (Sweden) Mirjam Björklund / (Sweden) Ida Jarlskog
- (Sweden) Jacqueline Cabaj Awad / (Sweden) Kajsa Rinaldo Persson

The following pair received entry as alternates:

- (Sweden) Ellen Allgurin / (Denmark) Karen Barritza

=== Withdrawals ===
Before the tournament

- (Montenegro) Danka Kovinić
