= 2018 Swedish Open =

- Date: 16–22 July
- Edition: 71st
- Category: World Tour 250
- Surface: Clay / outdoor
- Venue: Båstad Tennis Stadium

Champions

Singles
- (Italy) Fabio Fognini

Doubles
- (Chile) Julio Peralta / (Argentina) Horacio Zeballos
← 2017 ·	Swedish Open	· 2019 →

The 2018 Swedish Open (also known as the SkiStar Swedish Open for sponsorship reasons) was a tennis tournament played on outdoor clay courts as part of the ATP World Tour 250 Series of the 2018 ATP World Tour. It took place in Båstad, Sweden, from 15 July until 22 July 2018. The women's tournament was discontinued this year and replaced by the Moscow River Cup.

== Finals ==
=== Singles ===
- (Italy) Fabio Fognini defeated (France) Richard Gasquet, 6–3, 3–6, 6–1

=== Doubles ===
- (Chile) Julio Peralta / (Argentina) Horacio Zeballos defeated (Italy) Simone Bolelli / (Italy) Fabio Fognini, 6–3, 6–4

== Singles main-draw entrants ==
=== Seeds ===
Country	Player	Rank^{1}	Seed
ARG	Diego Schwartzman	11	1
ESP	Pablo Carreño Busta	12	2
ITA	Fabio Fognini	16	3
FRA	Richard Gasquet	31	4
ESP	Fernando Verdasco	34	5
ARG	Leonardo Mayer	36	6
ESP	David Ferrer	37	7
AUS	John Millman	56	8

- ^{1} Rankings are as of July 2, 2018

=== Other entrants ===
The following players received wildcards into the singles main draw:

- (Spain) Jaume Munar
- (Norway) Casper Ruud
- (Sweden) Mikael Ymer

The following players received entry from the qualifying draw:

- (Italy) Simone Bolelli
- (Czech Republic) Zdeněk Kolář
- (Argentina) Juan Ignacio Londero
- (France) Corentin Moutet

The following player received entry as a lucky loser:

- (Switzerland) Henri Laaksonen

=== Withdrawals ===
- (Argentina) Nicolás Kicker → replaced by (Brazil) Thiago Monteiro
- (Serbia) Viktor Troicki → replaced by (Switzerland) Henri Laaksonen
- (Greece) Stefanos Tsitsipas → replaced by (Italy) Lorenzo Sonego
- (Switzerland) Stan Wawrinka → replaced by (Austria) Gerald Melzer

== Doubles main-draw entrants ==
=== Seeds ===
Country	Player	Country	Player	Rank^{1}	Seed
BLR	Max Mirnyi	AUT	Philipp Oswald	73	1
CHI	Julio Peralta	ARG	Horacio Zeballos	78	2
NZL	Marcus Daniell	NED	Wesley Koolhof	88	3
ESP	David Marrero	PAK	Aisam-ul-Haq Qureshi	90	4

- Rankings are as of July 2, 2018

=== Other entrants ===
The following pairs received wildcards into the doubles main draw:

- (Sweden) Markus Eriksson / (Sweden) Andreas Siljeström
- (Sweden) Elias Ymer / (Sweden) Mikael Ymer
