= 2017 Swedish Open – Men's doubles =

Men's doubles
- 2017 Swedish Open

Final
- Champions: (Austria) Julian Knowle (Germany) Philipp Petzschner
- Runners-up: (Netherlands) Sander Arends (Netherlands) Matwé Middelkoop
- Score: 6–2, 3–6, [10–7]

Details
- Draw: 16
- Seeds: 4

Events
Singles	men	women
Doubles	men	women
- Swedish Open

Marcel Granollers and David Marrero were the defending champions, but Granollers chose not to participate this year. Marrero played alongside Nenad Zimonjić, but lost in the quarterfinals to Elias and Mikael Ymer.

Julian Knowle and Philipp Petzschner won the title, defeating Sander Arends and Matwé Middelkoop in the final, 6–2, 3–6, [10–7].

== Seeds ==
1. (Chile) Julio Peralta / (Argentina) Horacio Zeballos (first round)
2. (Spain) David Marrero / (Serbia) Nenad Zimonjić (quarterfinals)
3. (New Zealand) Marcus Daniell / (Brazil) Marcelo Demoliner (quarterfinals)
4. (France) Jérémy Chardy / (United States) Nicholas Monroe (withdrew)

== Draw ==
Key

- Q = Qualifier
- WC = Wild card
- LL = Lucky loser
- Alt = Alternate
- ITF = ITF entry
- PR = Protected ranking
- SR = Special ranking
- SE = Special exempt
- JE = Junior exempt
- JR = Junior Accelerator Programme entrant
- CO = College Accelerator Programme entrant
- NG = Next Gen Accelerator Program entrant
- w/o = Walkover
- r = Retired
- d = Defaulted

=== Draw ===
First round
1	(Chile) J Peralta (Argentina) H Zeballos	3	6^{6}
(Brazil) T Bellucci (Brazil) A Sá	6	7^{8}
(Israel) J Erlich (Argentina) D Schwartzman	2	7	[15]
(Germany) D Brown (Russia) K Khachanov	6	5	[17]
Alt	(Sweden) I Arvidsson (Sweden) F Simonsson	6^{7}	6	[6]
(Uruguay) A Behar (Serbia) D Lajović	7^{9}	3	[10]
(Italy) A Motti (Spain) A Ramos Viñolas	4	6^{7}
PR	(Netherlands) S Arends (Netherlands) M Middelkoop	6	7^{9}
(Argentina) F Delbonis (Peru) S Galdós	5	6	[9]
(Austria) J Knowle (Germany) P Petzschner	7	4	[11]
WC	(Sweden) J Brunström (Sweden) A Siljeström	1	7^{12}	[8]
3	(New Zealand) M Daniell (Brazil) M Demoliner	6	6^{10}	[10]
WC	(Sweden) E Ymer (Sweden) M Ymer	6	6
(Chile) H Podlipnik-Castillo (Belarus) A Vasilevski	4	3
(Germany) A Begemann (Austria) P Oswald	7^{7}	5	[3]
2	(Spain) D Marrero (Serbia) N Zimonjić	6^{2}	7	[10]

Quarterfinals
(Brazil) T Bellucci (Brazil) A Sá	6	6
(Germany) D Brown (Russia) K Khachanov	4	0
(Uruguay) A Behar (Serbia) D Lajović	3	4
PR	(Netherlands) S Arends (Netherlands) M Middelkoop	6	6
(Austria) J Knowle (Germany) P Petzschner	0	6	[10]
3	(New Zealand) M Daniell (Brazil) M Demoliner	6	4	[8]
WC	(Sweden) E Ymer (Sweden) M Ymer	7	7^{7}
2	(Spain) D Marrero (Serbia) N Zimonjić	5	6^{3}

Semifinals
(Brazil) T Bellucci (Brazil) A Sá	6	2	[8]
PR	(Netherlands) S Arends (Netherlands) M Middelkoop	2	6	[10]
(Austria) J Knowle (Germany) P Petzschner	6	2	[10]
WC	(Sweden) E Ymer (Sweden) M Ymer	4	6	[3]

Final
PR	(Netherlands) S Arends (Netherlands) M Middelkoop	2	6	[7]
(Austria) J Knowle (Germany) P Petzschner	6	3	[10]
