= 2017 Swedish Open – Men's singles =

Men's singles
- 2017 Swedish Open

Final
- Champion: (Spain) David Ferrer
- Runner-up: (Ukraine) Alexandr Dolgopolov
- Score: 6–4, 6–4

Details
- Draw: 28 (4 Q / 3 WC )
- Seeds: 8

Events
Singles	men	women
Doubles	men	women
- Swedish Open

Albert Ramos Viñolas was the defending champion, but lost in the quarterfinals to Fernando Verdasco.

David Ferrer won his third title in Båstad, defeating Alexandr Dolgopolov in the final, 6–4, 6–4, ending a 21-month title drought.

== Seeds ==
The top four seeds receive a bye into the second round.

1. (Spain) Pablo Carreño Busta (second round, retired)
2. (Spain) Albert Ramos Viñolas (quarterfinals)
3. (Uruguay) Pablo Cuevas (second round)
4. (France) Richard Gasquet (withdrew)
5. (Russia) Karen Khachanov (quarterfinals)
6. (Spain) Fernando Verdasco (semifinals)
7. (Argentina) Diego Schwartzman (quarterfinals)
8. (Spain) David Ferrer (champion)
9. (Argentina) Horacio Zeballos (second round)

== Draw ==
Key

- Q = Qualifier
- WC = Wild card
- LL = Lucky loser
- Alt = Alternate
- ITF = ITF entry
- PR = Protected ranking
- SR = Special ranking
- SE = Special exempt
- JE = Junior exempt
- JR = Junior Accelerator Programme entrant
- CO = College Accelerator Programme entrant
- NG = Next Gen Accelerator Program entrant
- w/o = Walkover
- r = Retired
- d = Defaulted

=== Finals ===
Semifinals
(Russia) Andrey Kuznetsov	3	2
(Ukraine) Alexandr Dolgopolov	6	6
8	(Spain) David Ferrer	6	6^{3}	6
6	(Spain) Fernando Verdasco	1	7^{7}	4

Final
(Ukraine) Alexandr Dolgopolov	4	4
8	(Spain) David Ferrer	6	6

=== Top half ===
First round
(Russia) A Kuznetsov	6	6
(Germany) J-L Struff	3	4
(Argentina) R Olivo	6	6
LL	(France) P-H Mathieu	2	4
Q	(Germany) M Marterer	1	3
7	(Argentina) D Schwartzman	6	6
PR	(Latvia) E Gulbis	4	6	6
Q	(Belgium) A De Greef	6	3	2
(Ukraine) A Dolgopolov	6	6
Q	(Argentina) L Mayer	3	2
(Georgia (country)) N Basilashvili	3	3
9	(Argentina) H Zeballos	6	6

Second round
1	(Spain) P Carreño Busta	6	6^{5}	0^{r}
(Russia) A Kuznetsov	4	7^{7}	3
(Argentina) R Olivo	4	1
7	(Argentina) D Schwartzman	6	6
5	(Russia) K Khachanov	4	7^{7}	6
PR	(Latvia) E Gulbis	6	6^{5}	3
(Ukraine) A Dolgopolov	6	6
9	(Argentina) H Zeballos	4	4

Quarterfinals
(Russia) A Kuznetsov	6	6
7	(Argentina) D Schwartzman	3	3
5	(Russia) K Khachanov	6^{5}	6	6^{2}
(Ukraine) A Dolgopolov	7^{7}	3	7^{7}

Semifinals
(Russia) A Kuznetsov	3	2
(Ukraine) A Dolgopolov	6	6

=== Bottom half ===
First round
8	(Spain) D Ferrer	6	6
Q	(Argentina) F Delbonis	3	4
(Brazil) T Bellucci	4	3
(Germany) D Brown	6	6
(Switzerland) H Laaksonen	7^{7}	7
WC	(Sweden) M Ymer	6^{5}	5
6	(Spain) F Verdasco	4	6	6
WC	(Sweden) E Ymer	6	3	4
WC	(Germany) T Haas	7^{7}	3	2
(Argentina) F Bagnis	6^{5}	6	6
(Brazil) T Monteiro	6	0
(Serbia) D Lajović	3	0^{r}

Second round
8	(Spain) D Ferrer	6	6
(Germany) D Brown	2	3
(Switzerland) H Laaksonen	6	6
3	(Uruguay) P Cuevas	4	3
6	(Spain) F Verdasco	6	6
(Argentina) F Bagnis	3	2
(Brazil) T Monteiro	6	4	3
2	(Spain) A Ramos Viñolas	3	6	6

Quarterfinals
8	(Spain) D Ferrer	7	3	7^{7}
(Switzerland) H Laaksonen	5	6	6^{3}
6	(Spain) F Verdasco	6	6
2	(Spain) A Ramos Viñolas	3	2

Semifinals
8	(Spain) D Ferrer	6	6^{3}	6
6	(Spain) F Verdasco	1	7^{7}	4

== Qualifying ==
=== Seeds ===
1. (Argentina) Federico Delbonis (qualified)
2. (Belgium) Arthur De Greef (qualified)
3. (Germany) Maximilian Marterer (qualified)
4. (France) Paul-Henri Mathieu (qualifying competition, lucky loser)
5. (France) Stéphane Robert (qualifying competition)
6. (France) Mathias Bourgue (first round, retired)
7. (Argentina) Leonardo Mayer (qualified)
8. (Belgium) Kimmer Coppejans (first round)

=== Qualifiers ===
1. (Argentina) Federico Delbonis
2. (Belgium) Arthur De Greef
3. (Germany) Maximilian Marterer
4. (Argentina) Leonardo Mayer

=== Lucky loser ===
1. (France) Paul-Henri Mathieu

=== Qualifying draw ===
==== First qualifier ====
First round
1	(Argentina) Federico Delbonis	6	6
Alt	(Sweden) Markus Eriksson	4	4
(France) Constant Lestienne	3	1^{r}
5	(France) Stéphane Robert	6	5

Qualifying competition
1	(Argentina) Federico Delbonis	6	6
5	(France) Stéphane Robert	2	3

==== Second qualifier ====
First round
2	(Belgium) Arthur De Greef	4	6	6
WC	(Sweden) Fred Simonsson	6	4	4
(Spain) Tommy Robredo	5
6	(France) Mathias Bourgue	1^{r}

Qualifying competition
2	(Belgium) Arthur De Greef	6	6
(Spain) Tommy Robredo	4	2

==== Third qualifier ====
First round
3	(Germany) Maximilian Marterer	6	6
Alt	(Sweden) André Göransson	2	1
(France) Calvin Hemery	6	6
8	(Belgium) Kimmer Coppejans	3	4

Qualifying competition
3	(Germany) Maximilian Marterer	6	6
(France) Calvin Hemery	2	2

==== Fourth qualifier ====
First round
4	(France) Paul-Henri Mathieu	6	6
WC	(Sweden) Isak Arvidsson	2	2
(France) Tristan Lamasine	6^{8}	7^{7}	2
7	(Argentina) Leonardo Mayer	7^{10}	6^{3}	6

Qualifying competition
4	(France) Paul-Henri Mathieu	6	3	2
7	(Argentina) Leonardo Mayer	2	6	6
