= Ida Jarlskog =

Swedish tennis player

- Country (sports): Sweden
- Born: 20 June 1998 (age 26)
- Prize money: $15,680

Singles
- Career record: 68–44
- Career titles: 0
- Highest ranking: No. 729 (7 August 2017)

Doubles
- Career record: 26–28
- Career titles: 1 ITF
- Highest ranking: No. 572 (2 October 2017)

Ida Jarlskog (born 20 June 1998) is a Swedish former professional tennis player.

== Career ==
Jarlskog has a career-high doubles ranking by the WTA of 572, achieved on 2 October 2017.

She made her WTA Tour main-draw debut at the 2017 Swedish Open in the doubles tournament, partnering Mirjam Björklund.

== ITF Circuit finals ==
=== Doubles (1–1) ===
| Legend $25,000 tournaments $10,000 tournaments | Finals by surface Hard (0–0) Clay (1–1) |

| Result | No. | Date | Tier | Tournament | Surface | Partner | Opponents | Score |
|---|---|---|---|---|---|---|---|---|
| Runner-up | 1. | 25 February 2017 | 15,000 | ITF Hammamet, Tunisia | Clay | (Sweden) Julia Rosenqvist | (Chinese Taipei) Hsu Chieh-yu (Egypt) Sandra Samir | 2–6, 5–7 |
| Winner | 1. | 2 July 2017 | 25,000 | ITF Lund, Sweden | Clay | (Sweden) Fanny Östlund | (Romania) Laura-Ioana Andrei (Germany) Julia Wachaczyk | 6–2, 6–7^{(4)}, [14–12] |
